= List of clarinetists =

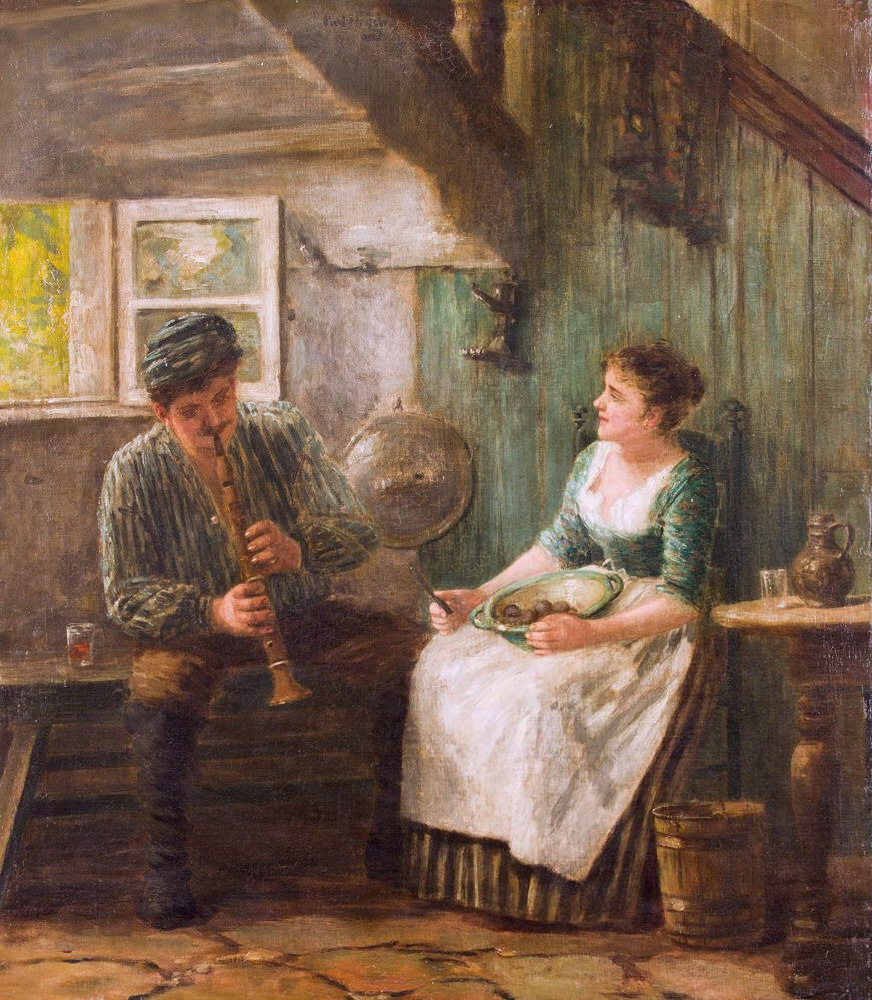
A Clarinet Serenade for the Kitchen Maid by Karl Heyden

This article lists notable musicians who have played the clarinet.

== Classical clarinetists ==
- Laver Bariu
- Ernest Ačkun
- Luís Afonso
- Cristiano Alves
- Michel Arrignon
- Dimitri Ashkenazy
- Kinan Azmeh
- Alexander Bader
- Carl Baermann
- Heinrich Baermann
- József Balogh
- Cristo Barrios
- Luigi Bassi
- Simeon Bellison
- Kalman Berkes
- Friedrich Berr
- Julian Bliss
- Kalman Bloch
- Walter Boeykens
- Henri Bok
- Daniel Bonade
- Tara Bouman
- Naftule Brandwein
- Shirley Brill
- Bruno Brun
- Jack Brymer
- Lars Kristian Brynildsen
- Nicola Bulfone
- Ovanir Buosi
- Sérgio Burgani
- Louis Cahuzac
- David Campbell
- James Campbell
- Alessandro Carbonare
- Radovan Cavallin
- Ernesto Cavallini
- Florent Charpentier
- Jonathan Cohler
- Larry Combs
- Jean-Noël Crocq
- Gervase de Peyer
- Hans Deinzer
- Guy Deplus
- Charles Draper
- Stanley Drucker
- Eli Eban
- Anton Eberst
- Julian Egerton
- Fredrik Fors
- Alan Frank
- Rupert Fankhauser
- Thomas Friedli
- Mariano Frogioni
- Martin Fröst
- Wenzel Fuchs
- Peter Geisler
- Anthony Gigliotti
- Bruno di Girolamo
- Johannes Gmeinder
- Jose Gonzalez Granero
- Ante Grgin
- Sabine Grofmeier
- Alan Hacker
- Chen Halevi
- Norman Hallam
- Burt Hara
- Russell Harlow
- David Hattner
- Richard Haynes
- Johann Simon Hermstedt
- Janet Hilton
- Johann Hindler
- Helmut Hödl
- Emma Johnson
- Nicola Jürgensen
- Sharon Kam
- Taira Kaneko
- Reginald Kell
- Murray Khouri
- Thea King
- Dieter Klöcker
- Howard Klug
- Béla Kovács
- Wolfgang Kornberger
- Kari Kriikku
- Alison Lambert
- Andrey Laukhin
- Colin Lawson
- Andreas Lehnert
- Karl Leister
- Michel Lethiec
- Lorin Levee
- Robert Lindemann
- Elsa Ludewig-Verdehr
- John Mahon
- Jon Manasse
- Sebastian Manz
- Robert Marcellus
- Michele Marelli
- Andrew Marriner
- Pascual Martínez-Forteza
- Lawrence Maxey
- Marco Antonio Mazzini
- William McColl
- Anthony McGill
- Ralph McLane
- Jacques Meertens
- Douglas Metcalf
- Paul Meyer
- Sabine Meyer
- Wolfgang Meyer
- Lev Mikhailov
- Pascal Moraguès
- Ricardo Morales
- Ivan Mozgovenko
- Richard Mühlfeld
- Elad Navon
- Charles Neidich
- Tale Ognenovski
- Sean Osborn
- Andreas Ottensamer
- Ernst Ottensamer
- Karen Palacios
- Edward Palanker
- Antony Pay
- Nicolai Pfeffer
- Thomas Piercy
- Frank Pilato
- George Pieterson
- Viktor Polatschek
- Manfred Preis
- Alfred Prinz
- Simon Reitmaier
- Håkan Rosengren
- Luis Rossi
- Sergei Rozanov
- Hubert Salmhofer
- Louis Sclavis
- Peter Schmidl
- Michael Seaver
- Raphaël Sévère
- David Shifrin
- Mark Simpson
- Vladimir Sokolov
- Nikola Srdić
- Anton Stadler
- Milenko Stefanović
- Karl-Heinz Steffens
- Suzanne Stephens
- Richard Stoltzman
- Peter Sunman
- David Tape
- Jens Thoben
- Frederick Thurston
- Alison Turriff
- Annelien Van Wauwe
- Jean-François Verdier
- Richard Sidney Walthew
- Bernard Walton
- David Weber
- Pamela Weston
- Michael Whight
- Jörg Widmann
- Leopold Wlach
- Harold Wright
- John Bruce Yeh
- Michele Zukovsky

== Jazz and pop clarinetists ==
- Muhal Richard Abrams (1930–2017)
- George Adams (1940–1992)
- Woody Allen (born 1935)
- Sophie Alour (born 1974)
- Lloyd Arntzen (born 1927)
- Georgie Auld (1919–1990)
- Nailor Azevedo (also known as Proveta)
- Paulo Moura (1932–2010)
- Buster Bailey (1902–1967)
- Craig Ball
- Eddie Barefield (1909–1991)
- Alan Barnes (born 1959)
- Emile Barnes (1892–1970)
- John Barnes (1932–2022)
- Gary Bartz (born 1940)
- Alvin Batiste (1932–2007)
- Heinie Beau (1911–1987)
- Sidney Bechet (1897–1959)
- Shloimke (Sam) Beckerman (1883–1974)
- Sidney Beckerman (1919–2007)
- Han Bennink (born 1942)
- Derek Bermel (born 1967)
- Barney Bigard (1906–1980)
- Acker Bilk (1929–2014)
- Chris Biscoe (born 1947)
- Andy Biskin
- Dan Block
- Hamiet Bluiett (1940–2018)
- Anthony Braxton (born 1945)
- Peter Brötzmann (1941–2023)
- Pud Brown (1917–1996)
- Sandy Brown (1929–1975)
- Albert Burbank (1902–1976)
- Don Byron (born 1958)
- Ernie Caceres (1911–1971)
- Happy Caldwell (1903–1978)
- Harry Carney (1910–1974)
- Benny Carter (1907–2003)
- Daniel Carter (born 1945)
- James Carter (born 1969)
- John Carter (1929–1991)
- John Casimir (1898–1963)
- George Cassidy (1936 - 2023)
- Evan Christopher (born 1969)
- Rod Cless (1907–1944)
- Tony Coe (1934–2023)
- Anat Cohen (born 1975)
- Randolph Colville (1942–2004)
- Louis Cottrell Jr. (1911–1978)
- Hank D'Amico (1915–1965)
- Eddie Daniels (born 1941)
- John Dankworth (1927–2010)
- Joe Darensbourg (1906–1985)
- Kenny Davern (1935–2006)
- Paul Dean (clarinetist) (born 1966)
- Buddy DeFranco (1923–2014)
- Tobias Delius (born 1964)
- Big Eye Louis Nelson Deslile (1885–1949)
- Simon Flem Devold (1929–2015)
- Johnny Dodds (1892–1940)
- Klaus Doldinger (born 1936)
- Eric Dolphy (1928–1964)
- Arne Domnérus (1924–2008)
- Jimmy Dorsey (1904–1957)
- Tommy Douglas (clarinetist) (1911–1965)
- Paquito D'Rivera (born 1948)
- Gerd Dudek (1938–2022)
- Paul Dunmall (born 1953)
- Kai Fagaschinski (born 1974)
- Wally Fawkes (1924–2023)
- Irving Fazola (1912–1949)
- Buddy Featherstonhaugh (1909–1976)
- Giora Feidman (born 1936)
- John Fernandes
- Pete Fountain (1930–2016)
- Bud Freeman (1906–1991)
- Chico Freeman (born 1949)
- Victor Goines (born 1961)
- Jimmy Giuffre (1921–2008)
- German Goldenshtayn (Klezmer) (1934–2006)
- Benny Goodman (1909–1986)
- Edmond Hall (1901–1967)
- Jimmy Hamilton (1917–1994)
- Arville Harris (1904–1954)
- Bob Helm (1914–2003)
- Woody Herman (1913–1987)
- Peanuts Hucko (1918–2003)
- Dink Johnson (1892–1954)
- Theo Jörgensmann (1948–2025)
- Mustafa Kandirali (1930–2020)
- David Krakauer (born 1956)
- Doreen Ketchens (born 1966)
- John LaPorta (1920–2004)
- Prince Lasha (1929–2008)
- Matt Lavelle (bass clarinet) (born 1970)
- Margot Leverett
- Walt Levinsky (1929–1999)
- George Lewis (1900–1969)
- Ted Lewis (1891–1971)
- Joe Maneri (1927–2009)
- Michael Marcus (born 1952)
- Joe Marsala (1907–1978)
- Stan McDonald (1935–2021)
- Hal McKusick (1924–2012)
- Mezz Mezzrow (1899–1972)
- Jean-Christian Michel (born 1938)
- Marcus Miller (born 1959)
- Gabriele Mirabassi (born 1967)
- Gussie Mueller (1890–1965)
- David Murray (born 1955)
- Don Murray (1904–1929)
- Phil Nimmons (1923–2024)
- Jimmie Noone (1895–1944)
- Alcide Nunez (1884–1934)
- Sean O'Boyle (born 1963)
- Tale Ognenovski (1922–2012)
- Sal Pace (1906–1982)
- Ivo Papazov (born 1952)
- Art Pepper (1925–1982)
- Ken Peplowski (born 1959)
- Sid Phillips (1907–1973)
- Michel Portal (born 1935)
- Doug Richford (1920–1987)
- Sammy Rimington (born 1942)
- Perry Robinson (1938–2018)
- Leon Roppolo (1902–1943)
- Ned Rothenberg (born 1956)
- Harold Rubin (1932–2020)
- Pee Wee Russell (1906–1969)
- Dan St. Marseille (born 1962)
- Tom Sancton (born 1949)
- Louis Sclavis (born 1953)
- Tony Scott (1921–2007)
- Artie Shaw (1910–2004)
- Harry Shields (1899–1971)
- Larry Shields (1893–1953)
- Omer Simeon (1902–1959)
- Bill Smith (1926–2020)
- Chris Speed (born 1967)
- S. Frederick Starr (born 1940)
- Milenko Stefanović (1930–2022)
- Richard Stoltzman (born 1942)
- Wilbur Sweatman (1882–1961)
- Antti Sarpila (born 1964)
- Monty Sunshine (1928–2010)
- Dave Tarras (1897–1989)
- Frank Teschemacher (1906–1932)
- Theo Travis (born 1964)
- Shankar Tucker (born 1987)
- Allan Vache (born 1953)
- Ken Vandermark (born 1964)
- Oliver Weindling (born 1955)
- Michael White (born 1954)
- Hans Olof (Putte) Wickman (1924–2006)
- Bob Wilber (1928–2019)
- Lester Young (1900–1959)
- Evan Ziporyn (born 1959)

== See also ==
- Lists of musicians
