= Forteza =

Forteza is a surname. Notable people with the surname include:

- Barbie Forteza (born 1997), Filipina actress
- Francisco Forteza (1892-1967), Uruguayan political figure
- Francisco Forteza (son) (1928-2005), Uruguayan political figure
- Lorena Forteza (born 1976), Colombian actress
- Pascual Martinez-Forteza (born 1972), Spanish clarinetist
- Paula Forteza (born 1986), French politician
