= Fankhauser =

Fankhauser is a surname. Notable people with the surname include:

- Clemens Fankhauser (born 1985), Austrian cyclist
- Gerhard Fankhauser (1901–1981), American embryologist
- James Fankhauser (1939–2025), American conductor, tenor and educator
- Merrell Fankhauser (born 1943), American singer, songwriter and guitarist
- Peter Fankhauser (born 1960), Swiss businessman, chief executive officer of the Thomas Cook Group
- Philipp Fankhauser (born 1964), Swiss blues musician and songwriter
- Rupert Fankhauser, Austrian clarinetist
- Urs Fankhauser (1943–2018), Swiss rower

== See also ==
- Fankhauser Reserve, a multi-sports venue in Southport, a suburb on the Gold Coast, Australia
