= Helmut Hödl =

Austrian clarinetist and composer (born 1969)

Helmut Hödl (born 16 November 1969, in Oberwart) is an Austrian clarinetist and composer.

Hödl first played clarinet at age six. He studied clarinet at the music academies of Vienna and Graz. He has appeared with the Bachkollegium of Stuttgart, the Woodwind Ensemble during Salzburg Mozart week, Ensemble des Jahrhundert, Klangforum Wien, the Vienna Philharmonic Orchestra and the Berlin Philharmonic Orchestra. He has been the principal clarinetist of the Vienna Volksoper since 1993, and has taught at the Josef Haydn Conservatory in Eisenstadt since 1998. He was the founder of the Vienna Clarinet Connection (VCC) with Rupert Fankhauser, Hubert Salmhofer, Wolfgang Kornberger. He has written many compositions for chamber groups and orchestras, especially for the VCC. He has also received commissions for the Jeunesse Musicale, Kutrovatz, the Vorarlberg Symphony Orchestra and the Haydn Trio Eisenstadt.

== Discography ==
- Czernowitzer Skizzen, with the Vienna Clarinet Connection. Gramola, 2008 (composition: Alexander Kukelka)
- Cafe Europa-live, with the Vienna Clarinet Connection. Extraplatte, 2006.
- Out of, with the Vienna Clarinet Connection. Extraplatte, 2002.
- Squaredance, with the Vienna Clarinet Connection. [Amadillo], 1999.
- Der kleine Klabautermann, with the Vienna Clarinet Connection. media forte, 1998.
- E+U, with the Vienna Clarinet Connection. Pepperland Records, 1997.
- Strauss in Vienna, with quintett wien. Nimbus Records, 1997.
- Bläserquintette, with quintett wien. Nimbus Records, 1996.
- VCC 001, with the Vienna Clarinet Connection. Pepperland Records, 1995.
- "unerhört", with Trio Clarin. ATP, 1991.
