= Navon =

Navon (Hebrew: נָבוֹן, lit. Intelligent) is a Hebrew-language surname. Notable people with the surname include:

== People ==
- Arieh Navon, Russian-Israeli painter and illustrator, cartoonist, and set designer
- Chaim Navon, Israeli rabbi, philosopher, writer, and publicist
- David Navon (born 1943), Israeli psychologist
- Dov Navon, Israeli actor, comedian, and TV host
- Elad Navon (born 2000) Israeli clarinetist
- Emmanuel Navon (born 1971), Israeli political scientist
- Gad Navon (1922–2006), chief rabbi of the Israel Defense Forces
- Ofira Navon (1936–1993), First Lady of Israel
- Ruthi Navon (born 1951), Israeli singer and actress
- Yisachar Navon, Paralympic athlete representing Israel
- Yitzhak Navon (1921–2015), President of Israel
- Yosef Navon (1858–1934), Israeli businessman

== See also ==
- Navon figure
- Nevo (Hebrew: נָבוֹ)
