= Scharoun =

Scharoun may refer to:

- Scharoun Ensemble, chamber music ensemble
- Hans Scharoun (1893−1972), German architect
