= Uusikuu =

Finnish-German band

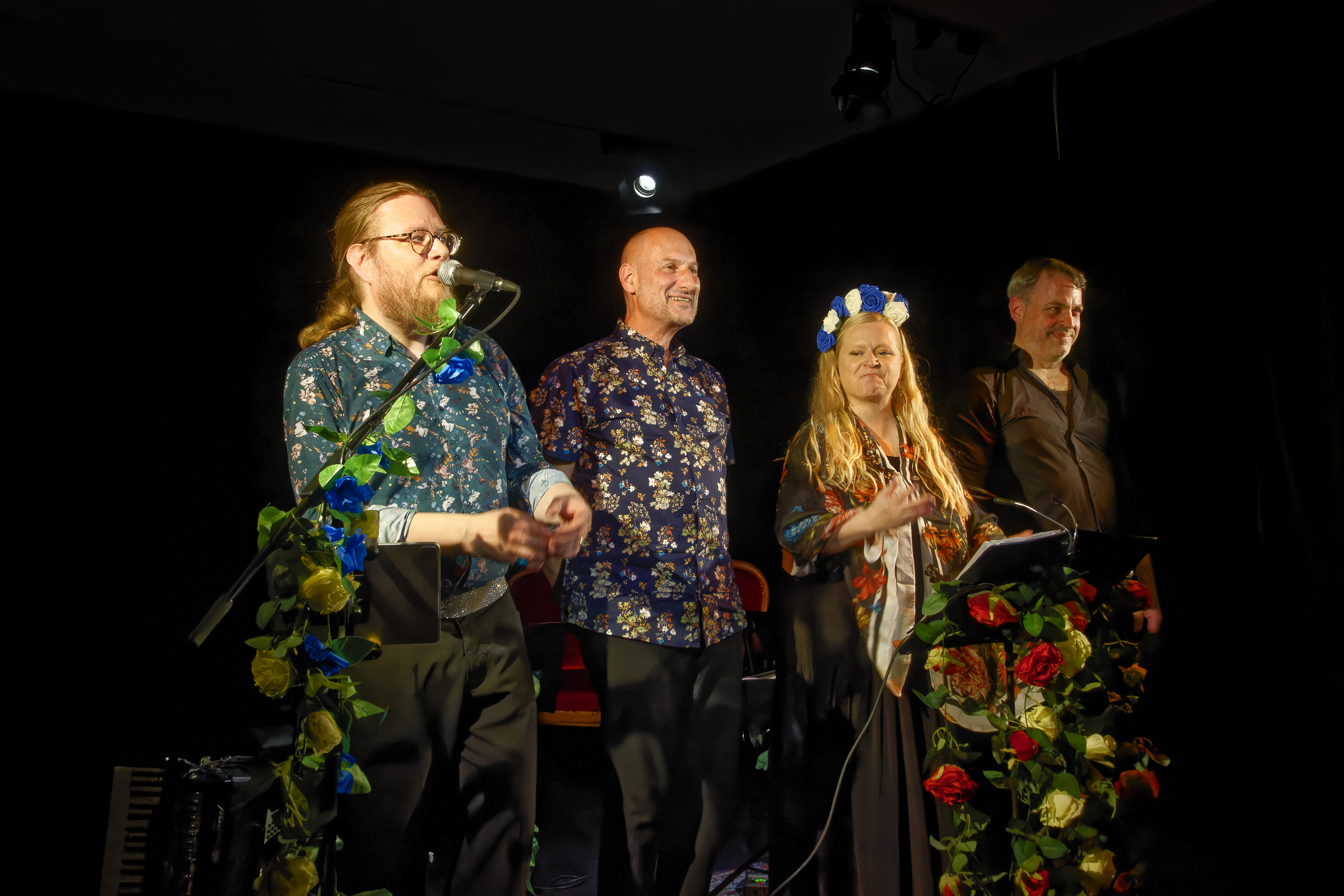

Background information
- Origin: Tübingen, Germany
- Years active: 2006-
- Labels: Nordic Notes; Humppa Records; Peregrina Music
- Members: Laura Ryhänen; Mikko Kuisma; Norbert Bremes; James Geier; Florian Dohrmann
- Past members: Janne Sartorius; Leo Laikola; Dominic Lash; Sebastian Schuster; Christoph Neuhaus
- Website: www.uusikuu.com

Uusikuu are a Finnish-German band founded in 2006 who play old Finnish dance music. The band is based in Tübingen, Germany. They are signed to the German world music label Nordic Notes.

== History ==
Uusikuu was formed in 2006 in Tübingen, Germany and the band has mainly toured in central Europe, but also in the UK and Finland. They play old Finnish dance music in the style of the golden era of Finnish tango from the 1930s to the 1960s. They also perform and record fast humppas, waltzes, slow foxtrots and swing numbers. Uusikuu's lead vocalist Laura Ryhänen and violinist Mikko Kuisma are Finnish; while the other band members are German. In addition to playing songs from the 20th century, band members also write new music in the same vintage style. The band has released six studio albums, the sixth one called Piknik having been released in February 2025.

== Collaborations ==
The band has also collaborated with a number of artists and bands, such as Argentinian bandoneonist Marcelo Nisinman, Argentinian tango singer Fernando Miceli, Finnish tango singer Amadeus Lundberg, Finnish Roma singer Hilja Grönfors, Württembergische Philharmonie Orchestra Reutlingen and conductor Atso Almila, and the German world music band Gankino Circus.

They have also collaborated with literature, theatre and film productions. In 2008, they were involved in making music for the 2008 film Finnischer Tango directed by Buket Alakuş. In 2012, they performed the music for the German language premiere of Olga, a play by Finnish playwright Laura Ruohonen, at Landestheater Tübingen. In 2016, they produced and performed KAIHO // the space in between together with UK-based physical theatre company Justice in Motion, and in 2018, they produced and performed Punahilkka, a musical theatre play with Nordic Puppet Ambassadors. In 2017, they worked with actor Raúl Semmler on a music and poetry programme Louhi combining readings from Finnish national epic poem Kalevala and Uusikuu's music. Since 2017 they have also worked with German author Claudia Brendler on a literature and music programme Wanderlust that brings together vintage Finnish music and Brendler's travel writings.

== Members ==
=== Current members ===
- Laura Ryhänen - vocals (2006–present)
- Mikko Kuisma - violin, vocals (2006–present)
- Norbert Bremes - accordion, backing vocals (2006–present)
- James Geier - guitar, backing vocals (2022–present)
- Florian Dohrmann - double bass, backing vocals (2022–present)

=== Former members ===
- Janne Sartorius - vocals (2006–2012)
- Dominic Lash - double bass (2006–2011)
- Leo Laikola - guitar, backing vocals (2006–2015)
- Sebastian Schuster - double bass (2011–2022)
- Christoph Neuhaus - guitar (2015–2022)

== Discography ==
=== Studio albums ===
- Hotelli Untola (2008, Peregrina Music)
- Babylonia (2010, Humppa Records)
- Suomi-neito (2016, Nordic Notes)
- Flamingo (2019, Nordic Notes)
- Karuselli (2022, Nordic Notes)
- Piknik (2025, Nordic Notes)
