= Daniel Bonade =

- Born: April 4, 1896; Geneva, Switzerland
- Died: October 30, 1976 (aged 80) Cannes, France

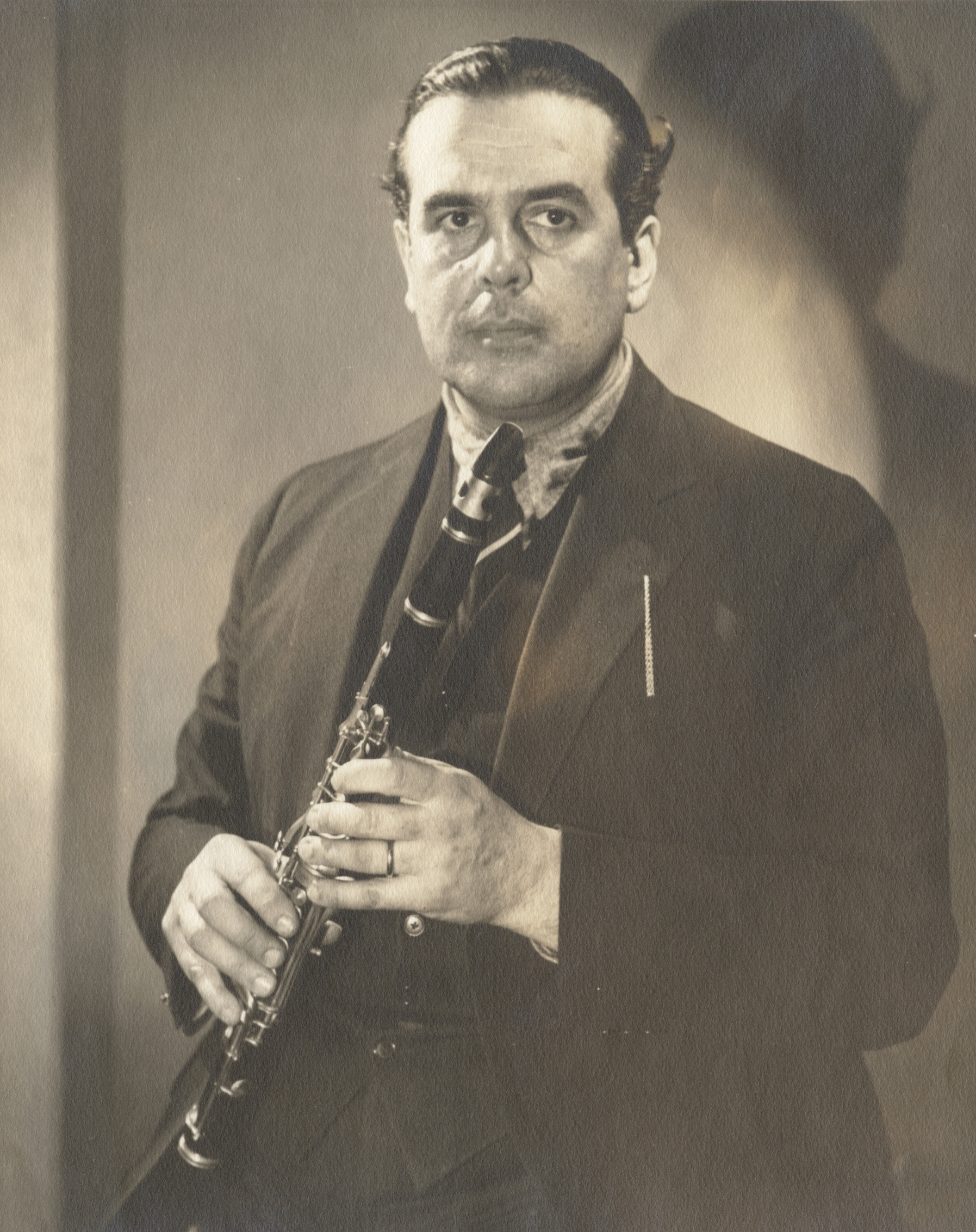
Daniel Bonade with his clarinet, 1938

Daniel Bonade (April 4, 1896 – October 30, 1976) was a French classical clarinetist and professor of clarinet. He was the most influential teacher of the first generation of American-born professional clarinetists.

== Biography ==
Daniel Bonade was born in Geneva, Switzerland on April 4, 1896. His father, Louis Bonade, was a clarinetist and received the Premier Prix diploma from the Paris Conservatory in 1870. His mother, Esther Poissenot, was a pianist and a vocalist.

After his father's death, Daniel Bonade began studying the clarinet with Ferdinand Capelle at age 8. He then studied with Henri Lefebvre, a student of Cyrille Rose. In 1910, while studying with Lefebvre, Bonade entered the Paris Conservatory and in 1913 at the age of 18 won the Premier Prix diploma. After completing his education at the Paris Conservatory, Bonade traveled with the Garde Republicane Band and also freelanced with Ballets Russes, the Sousa Band and other groups.

In 1916, Bonade was offered the principal clarinet position of the Philadelphia Orchestra under the direction of Leopold Stokowski. Bonade was with the Philadelphia Orchestra until 1922 when he took a leave of absence for two years due to salary negotiations. He returned to the orchestra in 1924 and left in 1930 because he thought the orchestra was not going to survive the stock market crash.

Bonade played with the Columbia Broadcasting Orchestra until 1933 when he was appointed principal clarinet of the Cleveland Orchestra. He remained with the Cleveland Orchestra from 1933 to 1941. After his stay in Cleveland, Bonade went on tour with the NBC Symphony Orchestra. Bonade's career was cut short by a heart attack after which he was advised by medical doctors to stop playing.

Bonade later devoted his time to teaching clarinet students and playing low-pressure engagements. He and his wife retired to France where he died in Cannes on October 30, 1976.

== Teaching ==
Bonade was considered to be one of the greatest clarinet teachers of his time. He taught at Curtis Institute of Music from 1924 to 1940, the Cleveland Institute of Music from 1933 to 1942, and the Juilliard School from 1948 to 1960. He continued teaching privately until his death.

Bonade had many successful students. Many of them held principal positions with orchestras or prestigious teaching positions. His students included:

- Robert McGinnis - Philadelphia Orchestra, New York Philharmonic
- Anthony Gigliotti – Philadelphia Orchestra
- Robert Marcellus - Cleveland Orchestra
- Richard Joiner - Colorado Symphony, National Symphony Orchestra, President's Own
- Emil Schmachtenberg - Cincinnati Symphony
- Mitchell Lurie - Pittsburgh Symphony, Chicago Symphony
- Bernard Portnoy - Cleveland Orchestra, Philadelphia Orchestra
- David Weber - New York City Ballet, CBS Symphony Orchestra, Juilliard School of Music
- Clark Brody - Chicago Symphony
- Robert Listokin - Radio City Orchestra, Symphony of the Air
- Ignatius N. Gennusa - Chicago Symphony Orchestra, Baltimore Symphony Orchestra

== Instruments and Equipment ==
Bonade played on Selmer clarinets through the beginning part of his career until Lefebvre's death when he was given Buffet clarinets that Lefebvre had inherited from Cyrille Rose. Bonade used these instruments until 1955, when he signed a contract with Leblanc Corporation and promoted their Symphony 3 clarinet line.

In 1957, Bonade received a patent for a ligature design which is still used by many professionals today.
