= Salmhofer =

Salmhofer is a German surname. Notable people with the surname include:

- Franz Salmhofer (1900–1975), Austrian composer, clarinetist and conductor
- Hubert Salmhofer (born 1964), Austrian clarinetist
- Viktor Salmhofer (1909–1988), Austrian canoeist
