= Nevo =

Nevo (Hebrew: נָבוֹ) is a Hebrew-language surname. It may also be a given name of Hebrew and other origins. Notable people with the name include:

- Aviv Nevo
- Eshkol Nevo
- Eviatar Nevo
- Gal Nevo
- Michal Krumer-Nevo
- Ran Har Nevo
- Sarah Nevo, (Hebrew: שרה נבו) the namesake of the genetic Nevo syndrome
- Vered Slonim-Nevo
- Yehuda D. Nevo
- Yoad Nevo
- Nevo Mizrahi
- Nevo Zisin

== See also ==
- Navon (Hebrew: נבון)
- Navo
