= Florent Charpentier =

French clarinetist

Florent Charpentier (born 1982) is a French clarinetist.

Charpentier began playing clarinet at age 8 under Philippe Moinet. He studied at the Conservatoire de Paris under Michel Arrignon and Pascal Moraguès, graduating in 2000. He then received a diploma in chamber music in 2002. He then enrolled in the Conservatoire national supérieur de musique de Lyon, graduating in 2006. Vandoren invited him to perform at Clarfest in 2007. He has performed with the World Youth Orchestra (soloing on the Mozart Clarinet Concerto in Tel Aviv), the National Orchestra of Lyon, and l'Orchestre de L'Opéra de Lyon (soloing on Gerald Finzi's Concerto). He also participated in a tour of Spain with the Orchestre de Paris. He was appointed head of the wind department at the Asnières-sur-Seine Conservatory in 2007.

Charpentier was the winner of the 2008 Prague Spring International Music Festival. He was the first Frenchman to receive this honor in 28 years. As the laureate, he premiered a new composition, "Sylinx" by Czech composer Kryštof Mařatka, at the 2009 festival. He also was a laureate of the 2009 Pablo Casals Festival of Prades. He is an artist of the World Clarinet Alliance. He performed in Concert Déclic for Radio France, and was broadcast nationally.

Charpentier plays a Buffet Crampon clarinet and a Selmer bass clarinet, with Vandoren mouthpieces.
