= Doug Richford =

British musician (1920 – 1987)

Douglas Frank Richford
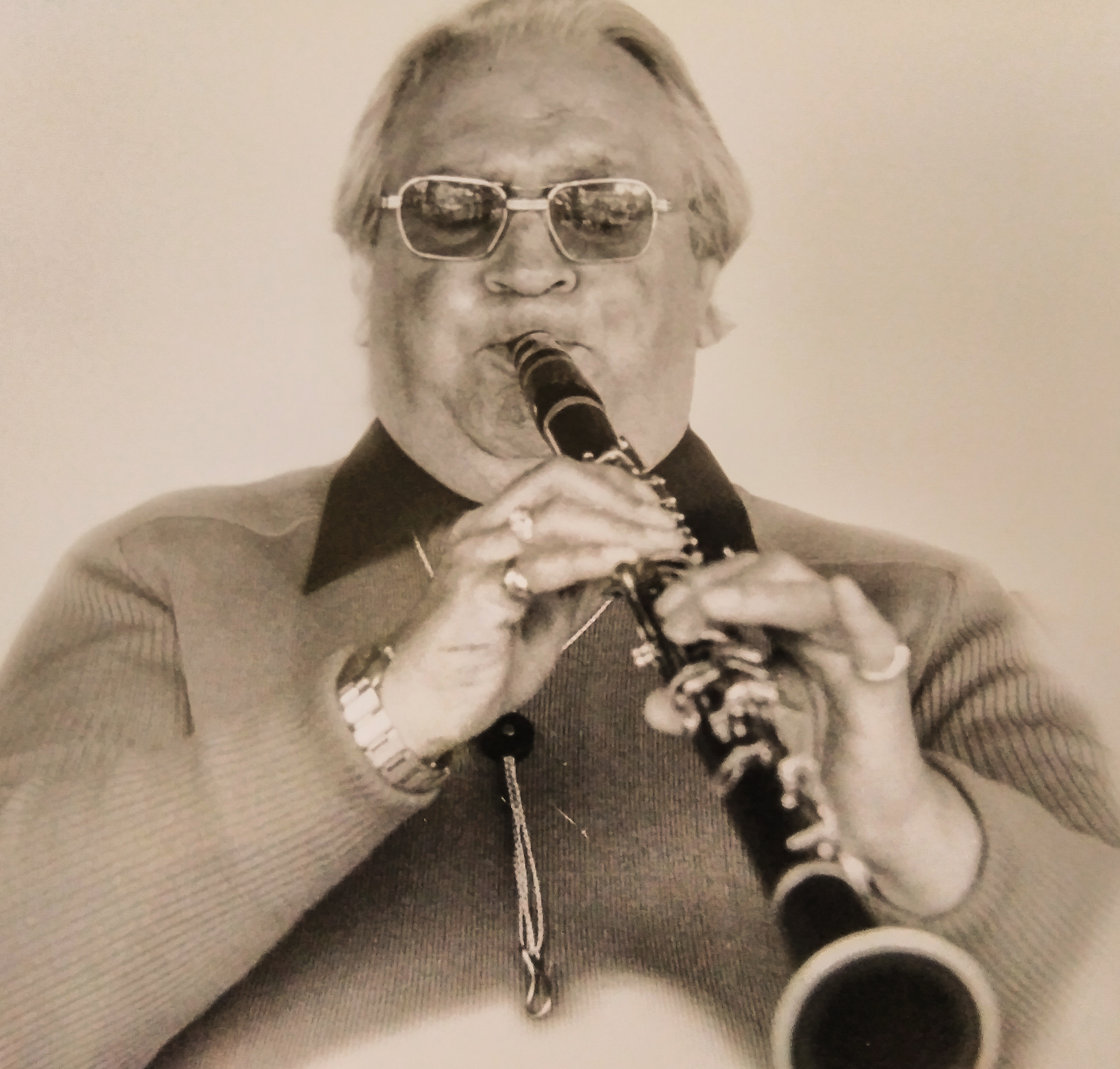

Background information
- Born: 1920; Camberwell, London, England
- Died: 1987 (aged 66–67) West Sussex, England
- Genres: Trad jazz, dixieland
- Instruments: Clarinet, saxophone, piano
- Years active: 1940s–1980s
- Labels: Parlophone, Storyville
- Publisher: Chappell

Douglas Frank Richford (1920 – 1987) was a British jazz clarinetist and saxophonist.

== Early career ==
Starting piano at age 7, he became a fan of Artie Shaw and Benny Goodman, taking up the clarinet at 13. A pupil of American clarinetist Danny Polo before the war, during Army Service in World War Two he played in the Lion Swing Stars. Following the war he led a 14-piece big-band, the Streamliners. After a stint with the River City Jazzmen in the early/mid 50s, Richford had his first professional job with George Chisholm and Tommy McQuator. In the later 1950s he was a member of Sonny Morris's and then Nat Gonella's bands; and from 1959 to 1961 Bob Wallis's Storyville Jazzmen, with whom he recorded.

== Doug Richford's London Jazzmen ==
Richford started his trad jazz band in July 1961, which debuted in Coventry. A week later, the boozy London Jazzmen played on a riverboat near Liege for Belgian TV. Trumpeter Trevor Jones, trombonist Eric Dalby, future illustrator Toni Goffe on double bass, 18-stone big Pete Deuchar on banjo, and Kenny Harrison on drums, were in the initial line-up. Clarinettist Gerry Turnham joined later that year.

Represented by the Lyn Dutton Agency Ltd, and financed by publishers Chappell, the DRLJ recorded in November 1961, and released in January 1962 on Parlophone records, their first single Yip-I-Addy-I-Ay/On Sunday I Go Sailing. The band was by then Pete Deuchar, Toni Goffe, Kenny Harrison, the legendary Nat Gonella trumpet/vocals, and Bill Hales trombone. After Colin Bowden took over as drummer, it was probably their second single that was recorded at Abbey Road studios, Cascading/12 Over the 8 - both Richford originals.

The band played in London, often late at night at Studio 51, known as the Ken Colyer Jazz Club off Leicester Square, and around England throughout its 1961-64 life. They appeared four times on the BBC Light Programme, alongside / introduced by Humphrey Littleton, Diz Dizley and George Melly. Trumpeter Nat Gonella was replaced in mid-1962 by young Australian Dick Tattam in his first professional role. Guitarist Paul Sealey also played with the band; vocalist Beryl Bryden appeared with them too.

As well as travelling in Britain, in 1963 the band visited Denmark, where three tracks were recorded by Copenhagen-based Storyville Records, - Spooky Takes A Holiday, Running Wild and Beedle-Um-Bum.

== Later career ==
After the Trad boom ended, as The Beatles changed popular music, Richford took a trio for a summer season in Jersey in 1964. Ironically Richford had appeared repeatedly at the Cavern Club in Liverpool, whilst the Beatles were still a local Merseybeat band performing there.

Richford returned to full-time music in 1978 to tour Germany with Steve Mason's Dixielanders, and then played "residences" in Zurich.

== Personal life ==
Richford was born in 1920 in Camberwell, London, where in 1945 he married Ellen Rolf; their son Lincoln Douglas Richford, born 1946, is a land reform campaigner in Scotland. Doug Richford died in West Sussex in 1987.
