= Alexander Bader =

German clarinetist (born 1965)

- Born: 1965 (age 60–61); Stuttgart, West Germany
- Genres: Classical
- Instruments: Clarinet, piano
- Formerly of: Komische Oper; Bavarian State Opera; Munich Philharmonic; Berliner Philharmoniker; Scharoun Ensemble

Alexander Bader (born 1965 in Stuttgart) is a German clarinetist.

He studied piano and clarinet at Berlin's Hochschule der Künste. His clarinet teachers were Manfred Preis and Peter Rieckhoff. He studied under Wolfgang Meyer in the Karlsruhe’s Staatliche Hochschule für Musik. He became a member of the Berliner Philharmoniker in 2006, after playing in Komische Oper as principal clarinet, as well as the Bavarian State Opera and the Munich Philharmonic. He is also a member of the Scharoun Ensemble.
