= Frank Pilato =

Frank Pilato Francesco Paolo Pilato
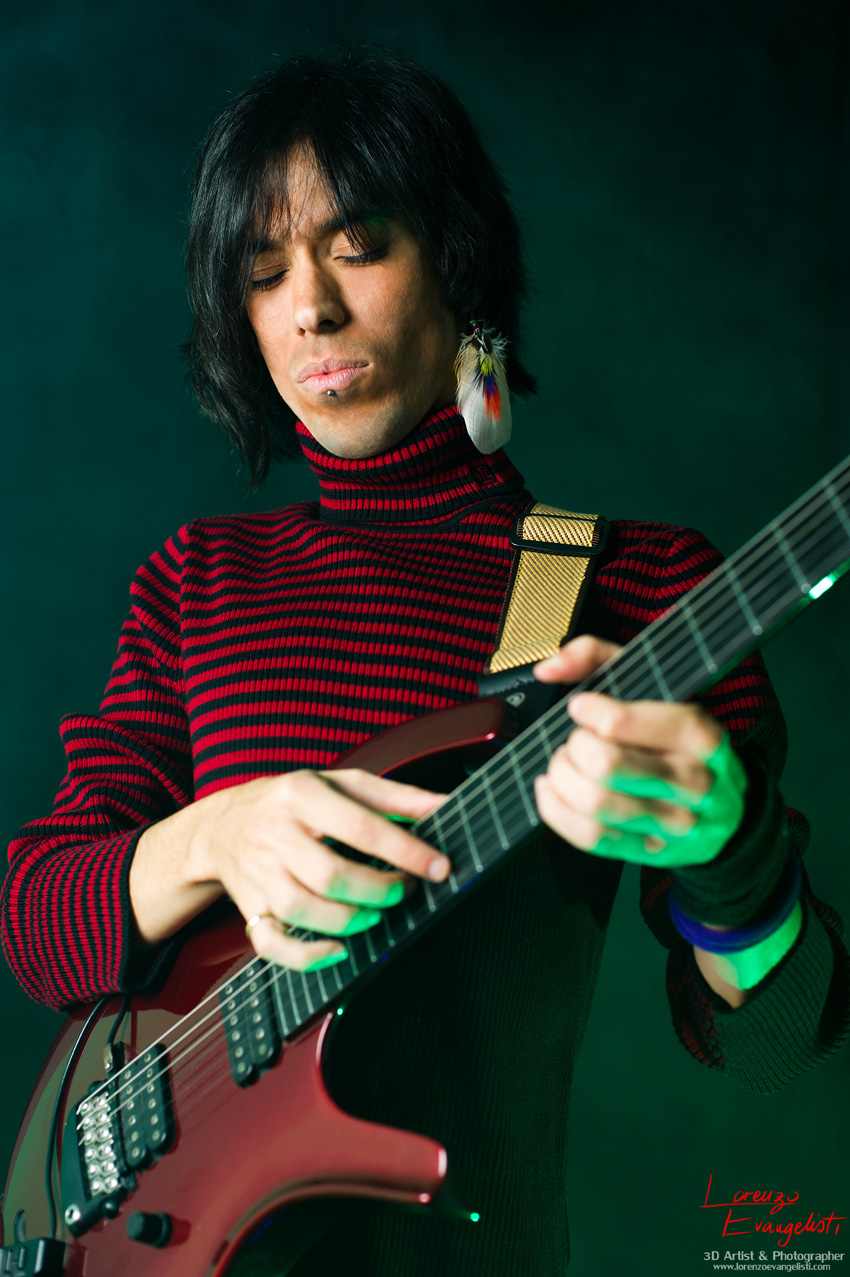
- Frank Pilato

Background information
- Genres: Fusion; Jazz; Rock; Classical music
- Occupations: Composer; Guitarist; Educator; Sideman
- Instruments: Guitar; Clarinet; Piano
- Years active: 1993–present
- Labels: ESC-Records * Sony * Relaxo Records * Lizard Records
- Website: http://www.frankpilato.com

Frank Pilato is a composer, guitarist, clarinetist and sound engineer.

== Biography ==
Frank Pilato (born Francesco Paolo Pilato, Firenze, December 4, 1982) is an Italian composer, guitarist, clarinetist and sound engineer. He began studying music theory and clarinet at age of 7. At the same time he began studying the guitar, the clarinet, and subsequently followed a degree in jazz guitar in the Ottorino Respighi Conservatory of Latina with Umberto Fiorentino. At the age of 20 he moved to California to study Rock and Fusion at the Musicians Institute in Hollywood where he obtained numerous awards including a scholarship. In 2014 he attended the summer courses in contemporary composition at the Internationale Ferienkurse für Neue Musik in Darmstadt, Germany. He is now a composer, guitarist, educator & session player.

== Career ==
At a young age he succeeds in performing the "24 Capricci per chitarra" (Niccolò Paganini) recorded and produced by Relaxo Record in a limited edition copies. At the age of 29, he replaces Allan Holdsworth in the last chapter of the "STORIES" trilogy by Maestro Andrea Marcelli. In 2014 and 2015, he plays at the Berlin Jazz Festival: Berlin Jazz Festival. the most important international jazz festival and in the same year he was cited in the Italian cultural institute in Berlin, Los Angeles and Paris. He takes part in the official Allan Holdsworth album tribute entitled: "Y.O.U."

His last work, "SPETTRI" was produced from "Toscana 100 bands", a project of the region of Tuscany for LIZARD RECORD.

Live and studio: Jeff Berlin, Gary Willis, Rose Villain, Andrea Marcelli, Dave Carpenter, Sophie Ellis Bextor, Garden Wall, Jolly Rox, Mitch Forman, Francesco Artusato, Allan Holdsworth, Ludovico Fulci, Matt Toka, Passogigante, Philippe Ciminato, Alessandro Seravalle, Tobias Relenberg, Michael Angelo Batio, Sushi Rain, Miranda, Frank Gambale, Paolo Fattorini, Andrea "Tower" Torricini, Michael Johnson Bop Quartet, Carmelo Leotta, M° Leonardo Rossi, Y.O.U., Plebs and many more.

== Publications ==
=== Solo albums ===
- 2001 – "24 Caprices" for Solo Guitar (Niccolò Paganini)
- 2005 – Spettri
- 2015 – Stories

=== Singles ===
- 2021 – Both sides now

=== Compilations ===
- 2023 – Y.O.U. Allan Holdsworth Tribute

=== Books ===
- 2025 – Modal Chromatization, Technique and Improvisation
- 2026 – The Coltrane Express: The ultimate guide to "Giant Steps"

=== Sound engineer ===
- 2005 – Frank Pilato - Spettri
- 2015 – Frank Pilato - Stories
- 2021 – Frank Pilato - Both sides now
- 2023 – Allan Holdsworth official tribute - Y.O.U.
- 2023 – Paolo Volpato Group - Metronoise

== Credits ==
- 2004 – Plebs ( Guitar solo on "United Gates" )
- 2007 – Giovani Giusti ( Guitar solo on "Buongiorno caporale" )
- 2008 – Passogigante ( Guitar solo on "Brivido Elettrico" )
- 2009 – Passogigante ( Guitar solo on "Boppin' Around" )
- 2010 – Paolo Fattorini ( Guitar solo and Voicings on "Un Metro E Mezzo D'Odio" ) - Unreleased -
- 2013 – Jolly Rox ( Guitar solo on "So We Are" )
- 2014 – Jolly Rox ( Guitar solo on "Dreamers Paradise" )
- 2015 – Sushi Rain ( Guitar solo on "Jesus Cries From Your Eyes" )
- 2019 – Paolo Volpato Group ( Guitar Solo on "Preludio/Contro" )
- 2020 – Michael Johnson Bop Quartet ( Guitar on "Giant Steps" and "KOKO" )
- 2021 – Marco Messina ( Guitar solo on "Mia" )
- 2022 – Chiara Maria ( Guitars on "Calling you" )
- 2023 – Y.O.U. ( "Sette Note In Nero" )
- 2026 – Garden Wall ( All solos on the album "Psicomachie" )
