= Bob Wallis =

Robert Wallis (3 June 1934 – 10 January 1991) was a British jazz musician, who had a handful of chart success in the early 1960s, during the UK traditional jazz boom.

== Biography ==
Wallis was born in Bridlington, East Riding of Yorkshire. At an early age Wallis joined the local Salvation Army band with his friend, Keith Avison, who was to play trombone with Wallis for a number of years. By the age of twenty, Wallis discovered jazz and set up his own band in Bridlington, which also played in Hull. His influence as a trumpeter was Henry Red Allen. Wallis played predominately with the Storyville Jazz Band, although earlier and later in his career he played with other bands.

He went to Denmark for a short spell, and recorded a couple of records there as the vocalist with the 'Washboard Beaters'. Once relocated to the UK, he went to London and played for a short time with Ken Colyer's Omega Brass, as well as joining Acker Bilk. These bands were recording mainly for the specialist 77 Records label.

Wallis joined up with Hugh Rainey's All Stars (Ginger Baker was their drummer at the time) and shortly afterwards the band changed its name to The Storyville Jazz Band, fronted by Wallis. In 1959 the band recorded an album for Top Rank Records, Everybody Loves Saturday Night. It peaked at No. 20 in the UK Albums Chart in June 1960. Two singles followed, and then the band moved to Pye Records, where they made three albums and a number of singles. Those singles included "I'm Shy Mary Ellen, I'm Shy" (1961) and "Come Along Please" (1962), which made No. 44 and No. 33 respectively in the UK Singles Chart. Wallis' Band also appeared in two films, It's Trad, Dad! and Two Left Feet. At this time the band was made up of Wallis on trumpet, Keith 'Avo' Avison (trombone), Doug Richford (clarinet), Pete Gresham (piano), Hugh Rainey (banjo and later guitar), Brian 'Drag' Kirby (bass) and Kenny Buckner (drums).

For the third album, The Wallis Collection, Al Gay replaced Richford and, following an illness, Buckner left to be replaced by Alan Poston.

In 1963, Wallis and his band who had been television regulars, as well as having a summer season at the London Palladium, broke up. Wallis played with one or two other bands before moving to the Continent where he spent most of his remaining years, still playing with reconstituted versions of the Storyville Jazzmen (variously billed as Storyville Jazz Band). Occasionally these bands included former colleagues, such as Avison and Gresham. Poston was still playing with the band when it made its final recordings in the mid-1980s. Clarinettist Forrie Cairns was also with the band for much of this time.

In January 1963, the British music magazine, NME reported that the biggest trad jazz event to be staged in Britain had taken place at Alexandra Palace. The event included George Melly, Diz Disley, Acker Bilk, Chris Barber, Kenny Ball, Ken Colyer, Monty Sunshine, Alex Welsh, Bruce Turner, Mick Mulligan and Wallis.

Ultimately Wallis settled in Zurich, Switzerland, with a residency at the Casa Bar. He continued to make records for European record labels Storyville Records, WAM and Pebe.

In 1990, Wallis returned to England with his wife, Joyce, where he died in hospital in 1991, at the age of 56.
