= Neuf-Berquin =

Neuf-Berquin Nieuw-Berkijn
- Commune
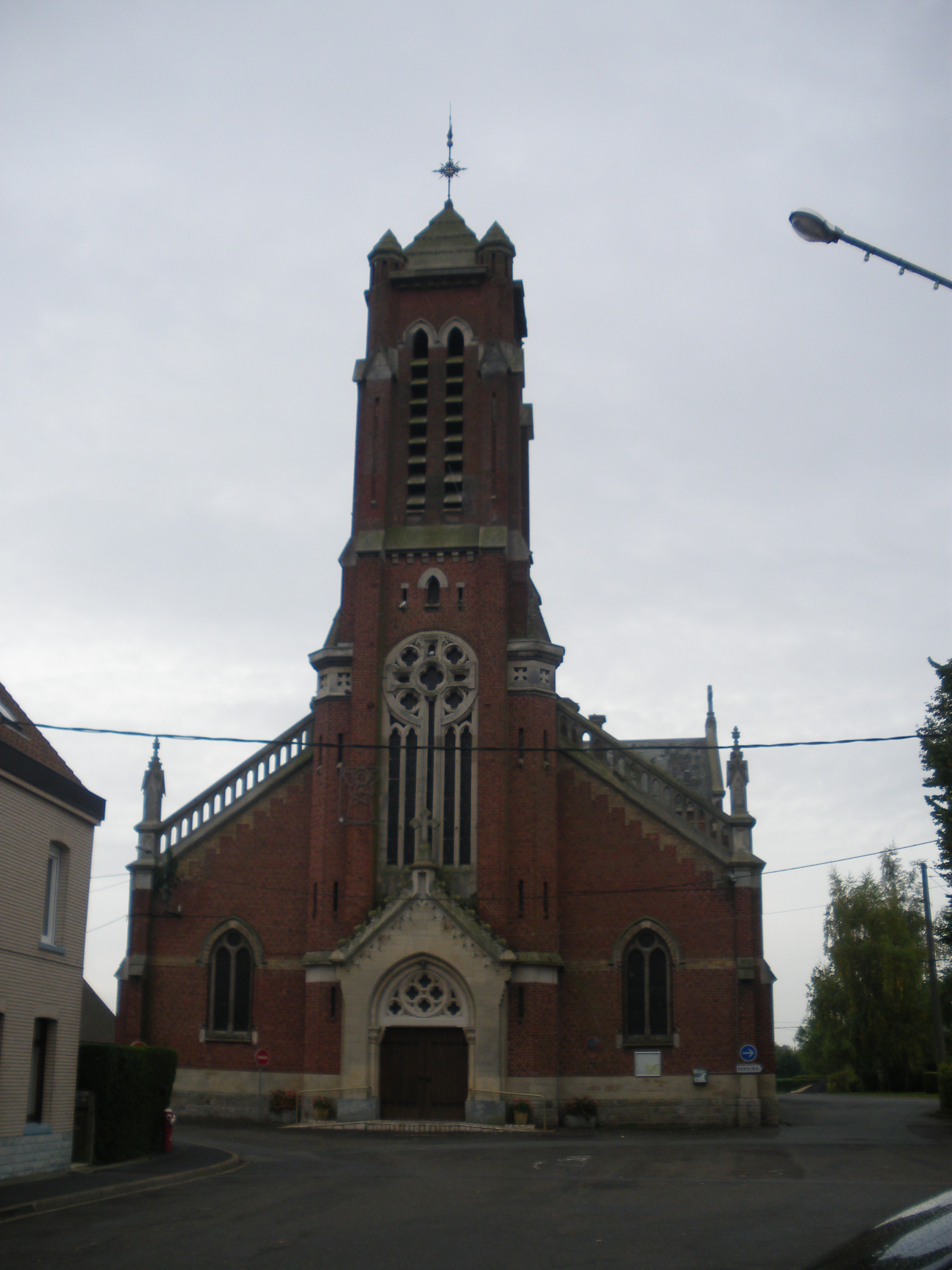
- The church in Neuf-Berquin

- Coat of arms
- Location of Neuf-Berquin
- Location within France Location within Hauts-de-France
- Coordinates: 50°39′40″N 2°40′20″E
- Country: France
- Region: Hauts-de-France
- Department: Nord
- Arrondissement: Dunkerque
- Canton: Hazebrouck
- Intercommunality: CA Cœur de Flandre

Government
  - Mayor (2020–2026): Serge Olivier
- Area^{1}: 6.4 km^{2} (2.5 sq mi)
- Elevation: 18 m (59 ft)
- Highest elevation: 18 m (59 ft)
- Lowest elevation: 15 m (49 ft)
- Population (2023): 1,417
  - Density: 220/km^{2} (570/sq mi)
- Demonym: Neuf-Berquinois (es)
- Time zone: UTC+01:00 (CET)
  - Summer (DST): UTC+02:00 (CEST)
- INSEE/Postal code: 59423 /59940
- ^{1} French Land Register data, which excludes lakes, ponds, glaciers > 1 km^{2} (0.386 sq mi or 247 acres) and river estuaries.

Neuf-Berquin (French pronunciation: [nœf bɛʁkɛ̃]; from Dutch: Nieuw-Berkijn) is a commune in the Nord department in northern France.

French composer and clarinetist Ferdinand Capelle was born in Neuf-Berquin.

== Heraldry ==
Arms of Neuf-Berquin	The arms of Neuf-Berquin are blazoned : Gules, an inescutcheon Or.

== See also ==
- Communes of the Nord department
