= Marcelo Nisinman =

Argentine musician

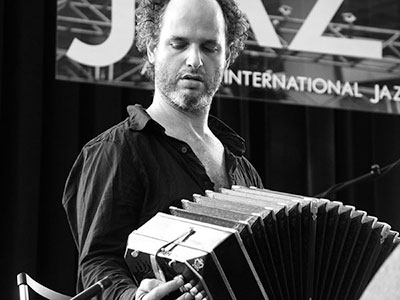
Marcelo Nisinman at Aarhus Jazz Festival, in Denmark

Marcelo Jaime Nisinman (born 21 December 1970 in Buenos Aires) is an Argentinian bandoneon player, composer and arranger living in Basel, Switzerland.

== Performance ==
Marcelo Nisinman studied the bandoneon with Julio Pane and composition with Guillermo Graetzer in Buenos Aires and Detlev Müller-Siemens in Basel.

He has performed with Gidon Kremer, Britten Sinfonia, Gary Burton, Fernando Suarez Paz, Ute Lemper, Assad Brothers, and the Philadelphia Orchestra conducted by Charles Dutoit. He has also appeared as a soloist with the WDR Big Band under Vince Mendoza, the Arpeggione Chamber Orchestra, Orchestre National des Pays de La Loire conducted by John Axelrod, The Stockholm Symphonic Winds and the Philharmonic Orchestra of Belgrad amongst others. Has performed as bandoneonist with a long list of tango legends, such as singers Roberto Goyeneche, Libertad Lamarque, Susana Rinaldi, Osvaldo Berlinghieri, Osvaldo Tarantino and Amelita Baltar.

== Works ==
His compositions are diverse and original with their origins in Buenos Aires, Nisinman also takes inspiration from other forms and techniques creating a personal style that breaks the traditions and rules of the "Musica Porteña" (Music of Buenos Aires city). He developed a particular tango style, combining traditional elements with colorful distortions based on atonality and contemporary music.

He has written music for a diverse range of groups, from symphony orchestra to string quartet and in 2004 he wrote his first chamber opera Señor Retorcimientos which premiered in Basel. He was composer in residence at the Oxford Chamber Music Festival in 2008, and has participated as composer/ performer in different festivals including; Kuhmo Chamber Music Festival (Finland), Sonoro Festival (Bucharest) Consonances (St Nazaire- France). During 2006 Nisinman composed a number of vocal works including "Desvios", with a text by Carlos Trafic (released on Acqua Records, 2009) and his New Version of Maria de Buenos Aires (Acqua Records 2010). In 2009, together with the clarinetist Chen Halevi he formed his own quartet Tango Factory; the group bring together four very different musicians to explore the tango, playing mainly works by Nisinman and other composers also.

== CD recordings ==
- Al Principio: Duos Bandoneon & Double Bass
- Desvios: Tango Theater Music, Music by Marcelo Nisinman, Text by Carlos Trafic.
- New version of Maria de Buenos Aires: a completely new version of the Piazzolla Operita written by Marcelo Nisinman.
- Homenaje al Tango: Marcelo Nisinman and his orchestra. Special guests: Knivkvartetten
- La Cumparsita: solos performed by Marcelo Nisinman
- Tango: Marcelo Nisinman & Tango Orkestret
- Tango for Bad People: Erling Kroner, Marcelo Nisinman and Diana Nuñez
