= Peter Schindler =

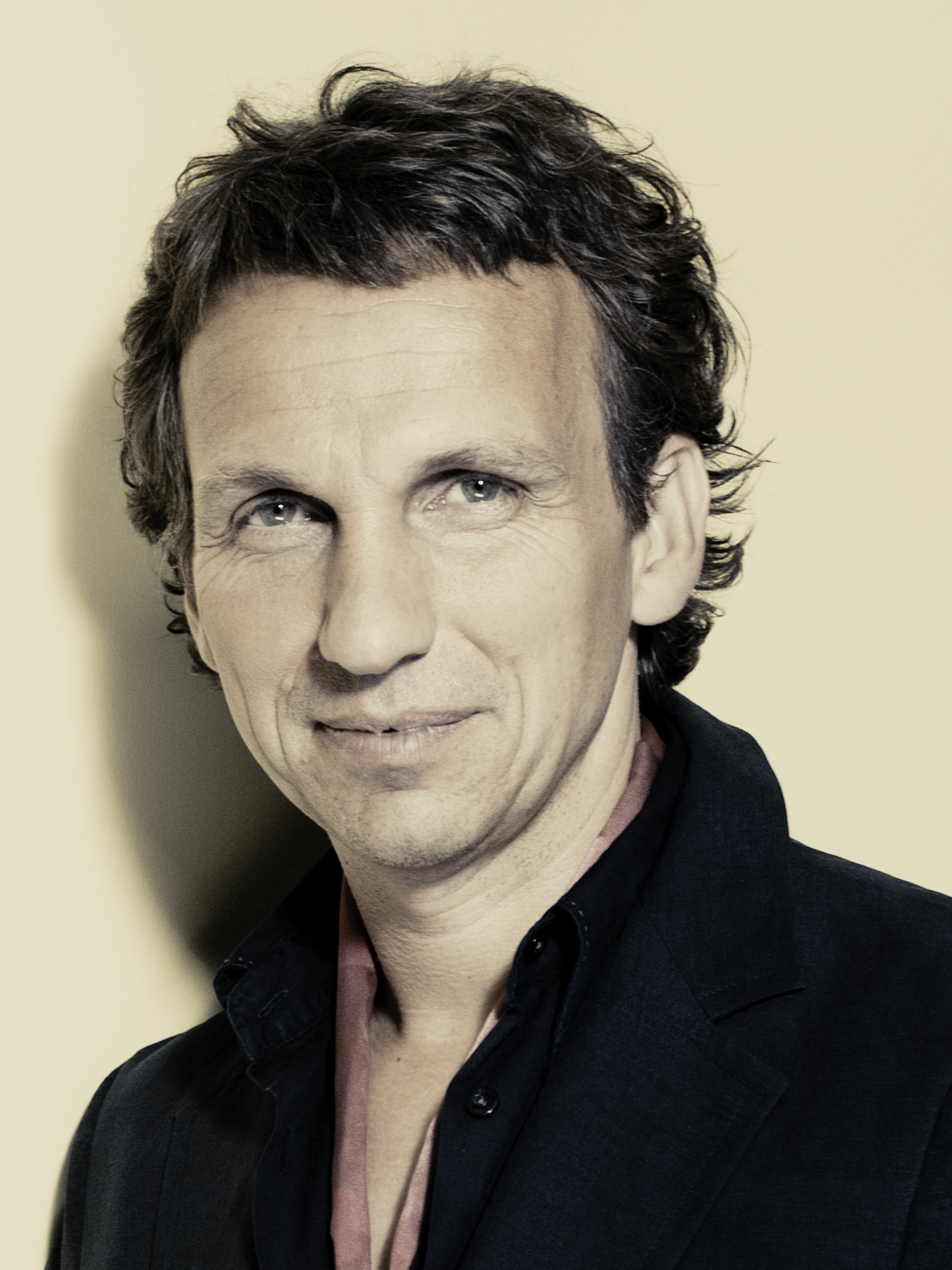

Background information
- Born: 26 April 1960 (age 66); Altensteig, Black Forest; Baden-Württemberg
- Origin: Berlin, Germany
- Occupations: pianist, organist, composer, author
- Instruments: Piano, Keyboard, Organ
- Years active: 1986–present
- Website: peter-schindler.de/

Peter Schindler (born 26 April 1960) is a German composer, pianist, keyboardist, organist and author, whose prime special field is musical theatre.

== Education ==
Peter Schindler was born in Altensteig in the Black Forest in the district of Calw, Baden-Württemberg, Germany. Following his talent in music, he early began taking piano lessons and later he began taking organ lessons.

From 1973 to 1976 he studied at the School of Church Music in Rottenburg am Neckar.

Until 1980 he lived in Stuttgart, where he studied School Music and Musical composition at the State University of Music and Performing Arts Stuttgart. Then he there also studied Jazz and Pop music (Postgraduate education) to 1988.

== Work ==
As an organist and pianist, he performs with various ensembles and interpreters primarily his own compositions, both at home and foreign. Concert tours with the Quintet Saltacello (founded by himself) as well as the group Pipes and Phones led him to China, Denmark, France, Italy, Korea, Austria, Poland, Scandinavia, Taiwan, Czech Republic, Switzerland and USA.

=== Musical theatre productions ===
Already 1987-89, during his studies he started as a répétiteur at the town theater Heilbronn.
Thereafter he was involved in several musical theater productions and had held their musical direction such as

- Staatstheater Stuttgart 1990-1992,
- Württembergische Landesbühne Esslingen 1993-1994,
- Theater im Westen, Stuttgart 1990-93,

=== Ensembles ===
==== Saltacello ====
Cast:	Wolfgang Schindler:	Cello
	Peter Lehel:	Saxophone
	M. Schulz:	Bass
	Peter Schindler:	Piano, Harmonium
	Herbert Wachter:	Drum kit

==== Pipes and Phones ====
Cast:	Peter Schindler:	Organ
	Peter Lehel:	Saxophone, Bass clarinet
Guests:	Markus Faller:	Percussion instrument
	Herbert Joos:	Trumpet, Flugelhorn
	Junger Kammerchor	Baden-Württemberg

==== Peter-Schindler-Combo ====
Cast:	Peter Schindler:	Piano
	Peter Lehel:	Saxophone
	Mini Schulz:	Bass
	Obi Jenne:	Drum kit

=== Compositions and lyrics ===
His works include chansons, instrumental parts, sacred and secular works for choir, music for ballet and drama as well as musicals, singing games and songs for children and young people. Children's songs by Peter Schindler (music and lyrics) and Chris Mohr (lyrics) have been published by Carus-Verlag Stuttgart.

== Awards ==
- 2000 Preis der deutschen Schallplattenkritik für die CD Suites mit „Pipes and Phones“
- 2001 Sonderpreis „Best Group“ bei dem „International Contest for Jazz and Churchorgan“ in Hannover mit „Pipes and Phones“
- 2006 Preis der deutschen Schallplattenkritik mit dem „Hoppel Hoppel Rhythm Club“
- 2006 Erster Seoul Preis für die Kompositionen und Darbietung der Tanzperformance „Soul, Sunflower“ mit dem National Theater of Korea
- 2007 Kleinkunstpreis Baden-Württemberg für das Chansonprogramm „Rosenzeit – Liebesleid“ zusammen mit der Sängerin Sandra Hartmann
- 2007 „Best Edition“ in the category Schul- und Unterrichtsliteratur für Kinder und Jugendliche des Deutschen Musikeditionspreises für das Musical Weihnachten fällt aus
