= Peter Lehel =

German jazz saxophonist and composer (born 1965)

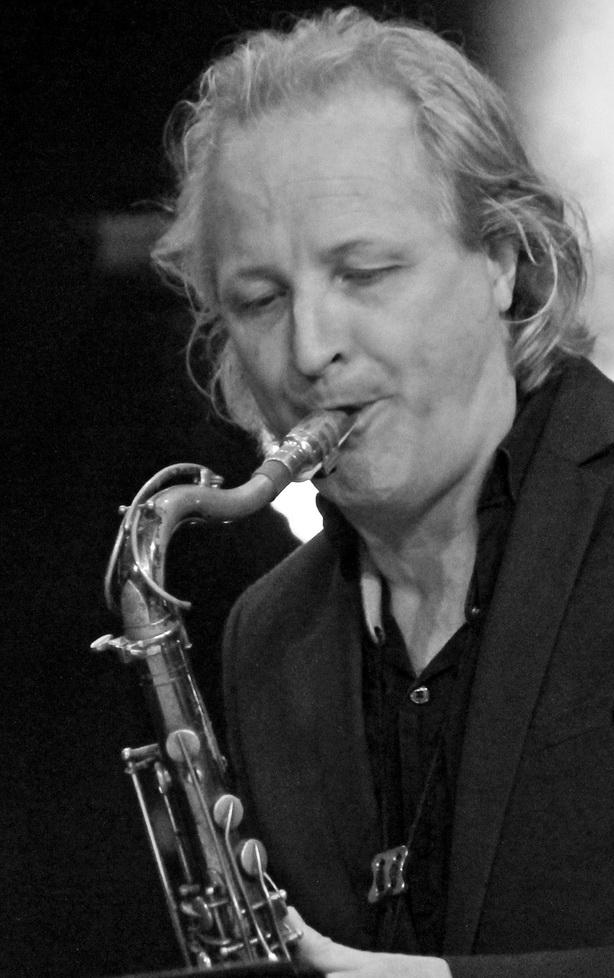

Background information
- Born: September 13, 1965 (age 61); Karlsruhe Baden-Württemberg
- Origin: Germany
- Genre: Jazz
- Occupations: saxophonist, composer
- Instruments: saxophone, bass clarinet
- Years active: 1990–present
- Label: finetone music
- Website: peter-lehel.de/

Peter Lehel (born 13 September 1965) is a German jazz saxophonist and composer.

== Life ==
Peter Lehel was born in Karlsruhe in the Upper Rhine Plain in (Baden-Württemberg). He began taking saxophone lessons at an early age. From 1988 to 1990 he studied Jazz and Pop music, focusing on saxophone at the State University of Music and Performing Arts Stuttgart. Until 1990 he lived in Budapest for one year, where he studied at the Franz Liszt Academy of Music and he completed his studies in Stuttgart in 1993. He is teaching jazz, theory, big band and saxophone at Music University Karlsruhe, Germany since 2004.

== Work ==
His music includes works for jazz quartet, saxophone quartet, big band, saxophone & organ, string quartet, jazz quartet with string orchestra, chamber music and symphony orchestra with jazz soloists.

As an arranger, he has worked for Barbara Dennerlein (CD "Change of Pace"), Sabine Meyer, Trio Clarone with Paquito D'Rivera.

He is co-owner of independent record label finetone music and since 2004 he is Professor for jazz, harmony, improvisation and big band at the Karlsruhe's University of Music.

=== Ensembles ===
Lehel is leader of his own groups such as Peter Lehel Quartet, and he is a member of:

- Pipes & Phones with the organist and composer Peter Schindler
- SaltaCello (also with Peter Schindler)
- Hoppel Hoppel Rhythm Club (jazz for children)

=== Discography (Range) ===
- Sea Of Love (2021), The New Peter Lehel Quartet
- Mood Antigua (2020), Finefones Saxophone Quartet
- Sonority(2019), Finefones Saxophone Quartet & Jim Snidero
- Nocturne (2019), with Wolfgang Meyer
- Hidden Tracks (2018), with Kálmán Oláh, Thomas Gunther, Ull Moeck
- Aria (2018), with Peter Schindler
- Lyrical Album (2016), with Kálmán Oláh, Mini Schulz
- Missa in Jazz (2016), with Chamber Choir Baden-Württemberg & Peter Lehel Quartet
- Chamber Jazz (2015), with Wolfgang Meyer & Peter Lehel Quartet
- Moonlight & Lovesongs (2015), with actor Siegfried Rauch & Peter Lehel Quartet
- The Clarinet (2014), with Wolfgang Meyer & Peter Lehel Quartet & Bigband University of Music Karlsruhe
- Two of a kind (2012), with Wolfgang Meyer & Sabine Meyer, Trio di Clarone
- Song of Praise (2012), with Chamber Choir Baden-Württemberg & Peter Lehel Quartet
- Bone Talks (2002, with Henning Wiegräbe & Peter Lehel Quartet
- Funk-a-lot (2011, with Finefones Saxophone Quartet
- Choro e Bossa Nova (2009), with clarinetist Wolfgang Meyer
- Boleros (2007), with Wolfgang Meyer
- Soul Balance (2007)
- Recht harmonisch (2005)
- Live At Birdland 59 (2004)
- Moods (2003)
- Ballads (2001)
- Heavy Rotation (1998)

== Awards ==
- 1997 Jazzpreis (Jazz prize) Baden-Württemberg
- 2000 Preis der deutschen Schallplattenkritik
- 2006 Preis der deutschen Schallplattenkritik
