= Douglas Metcalf =

Douglas R. Metcalf is an American clarinetist who has garnered acclaim as a performer and educator throughout the United States, Europe and the Middle East.

== Life ==
Douglas Metcalf was born in Southwick, Massachusetts and studied with Michael Sussman and Allan Meyer, graduating with honors from the University of Massachusetts Amherst, in both Music Education and Clarinet Performance. He went on to do postgraduate studies at Indiana University Bloomington with Eli Eban.

He has performed under the baton of James Conlon, Peter Oundjian, Hans Vonk, David Zinman, Robert Stern and chamber music performances with members of the Berlin Philharmonic, Chamber Orchestra of Europe and many others. He has played in the Spokane Symphony (Washington), Springfield Symphony Orchestra (Massachusetts), Commonwealth Opera Company (Massachusetts) and the Columbus Philharmonic Orchestra (Indiana). He toured the United States as the principal clarinettist of the American Wind Symphony Orchestra and has performed in the Aspen, Sarasota, Zermatt (Switzerland), Opera Barga (Italy), Texas (Houston) Music Festivals and the Altmärkisches Musikfest in Germany as well as being a regular guest of the Worcester Chamber Music Society.

He was appointed by Daniel Barenboim to be the Clarinet Professor of the Barenboim-Said Foundation's Free International Music School in February 2006, which aims to promote culture growth and peace in the Middle East. He teaches in Ramallah, Jerusalem and Nablus.

He also teaches at the Rheinische Musikschule in Cologne, Germany.
