= Michal Krumer-Nevo =

Israeli academic

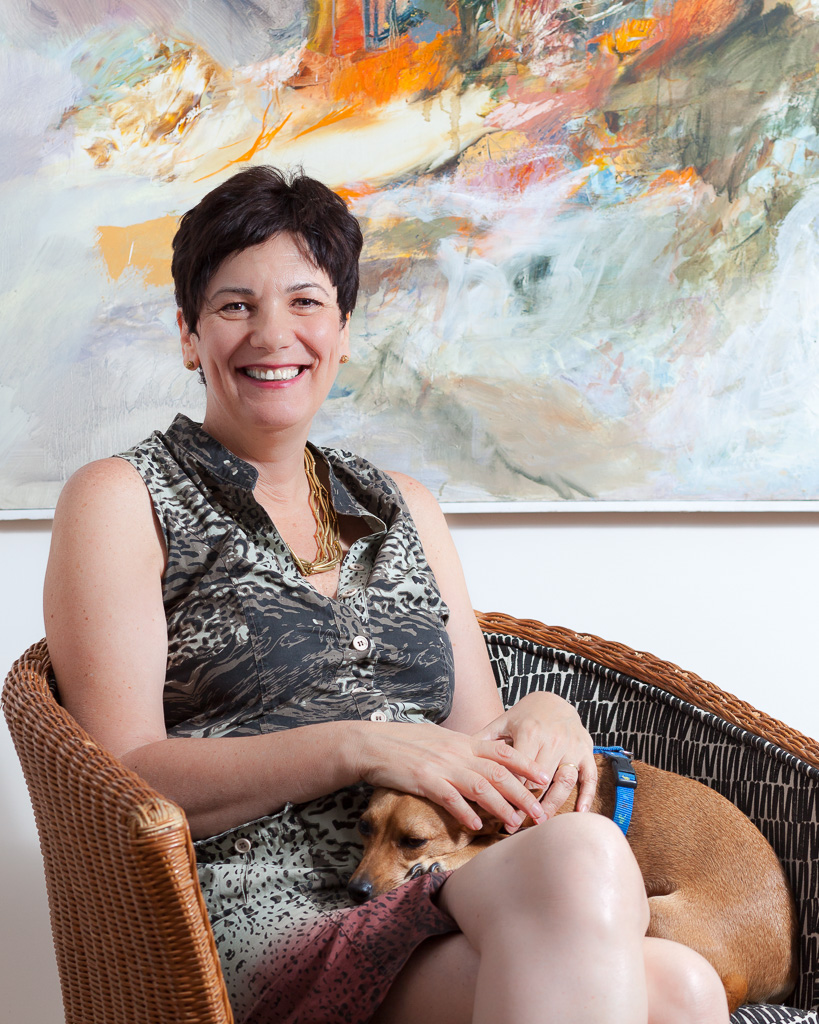
- Born: 8 June 1961 (age 65); Israel
- Education: Hebrew University of Jerusalem
- Awards: Lifetime Achievement Award (Espanet-Israel), Lifetime Achievement Award (Ministry of Welfare and Social Services in Israel)
- Scientific career
- Fields: social work
- Workplaces: Ben-Gurion University of the Negev
- Doctoral advisor: Jona Rosenfeld

Michal Livia Krumer-Nevo (Hebrew: מיכל קרומר-נבו; born 8 June 1961) is the David and Dorothy Schwartzman professor in Community Development at the Spitzer Department of Social Work and the honorary president of the Israeli Center for Qualitative Research of People and Societies, Ben-Gurion University of the Negev. Her scholarly activity covers issues of poverty, critical practice in social work, social injustice, Othering and qualitative methodologies. She developed the poverty-aware paradigm (PAP), a social justice framework for practice with people in poverty that has been widely implemented by the Welfare and Social Services Ministry in Israel.

== Early life and education ==
Krumer-Nevo was born and raised in Givatayim, Israel. She received a bachelor's degree in Hebrew literature from The Hebrew University of Jerusalem and went on to study social work. She wrote her master's thesis and doctoral dissertation in social work under the supervision of Prof. Jona Rosenfeld(de) (died 28 December 2023) at The Hebrew University. During her studies, she specialized in psychotherapy and worked as a social worker in services for youth and in mental health frameworks.

== Career ==
In 2000, she arrived at Ben-Gurion University of the Negev as a postdoctoral Kreitman fellow, and became a faculty member in 2002. Krumer-Nevo served as a research fellow at the Chapin Hall Center for Children at the University of Chicago and at the University of Pennsylvania. During 2006-2016 she was the director of the Israeli Center for Qualitative Research of People and Societies. She is the chair of critical social work tracks that she founded at the B.A and M.A programs at BGU. In 2013, she was a member of the Israel Committee for the War against Poverty, and since 2016 has served as senior academic advisor to the Ministry of Welfare and Social Services. Since 2021, Krumer-Nevo is the holder of the David and Dorothy Schwartzman chair in Community Development at the Spitzer Department of Ben-Gurion University of the Negev. She also was invited to teach in Italy, Belgium, Finland and the UK.

== Academic and Public Activity ==
=== The Poverty-Aware Paradigm (PAP) ===
Krumer-Nevo developed the Poverty-Aware paradigm (PAP) that defines poverty as a violation of human rights and emphasizes the daily resistance of people in poverty to their predicament. The paradigm includes theoretical premises and a detailed model of direct practice, incorporating principles of critical social work, social activism, and relational psychotherapy. According to PAP, in order to be relevant for people in poverty social workers should understand their practice as political, reject the hegemonic discourse of poverty and stand by service users in their struggle against poverty.

In 2006 she published Women in Poverty: Gender, Pain, Resistance, the first book in Hebrew that analyzes life stories of women in poverty through a feminist intersectional framework. Later, she conducted the first participatory action research with people in poverty in Israel. During the years, based on connections with the International Movement ATD Fourth World, she has been involved in the activist Forum for the Battle against Poverty, which initiated a special annual day for the eradication of poverty in the Israeli Knesset.

In 2015 the Welfare and Social Services Ministry implemented the PAP nationwide. As part of this implementation, the Ministry has launched new programs and rights centers in social service departments in more than half of the municipalities in Israel, and has established a new role of 'Social Rights Social Worker'.

The book Radical Hope: Poverty-Aware Practice for Social Work (Policy Press, 2020) that summarizes the experience gained through the implementation of PAP was awarded the 2021 book award by the Society for Social Work and Research (SSWR).

=== Critical social work ===
Based on teaching courses on critical social work in BGU, Krumer-Nevo established special critical social work tracks within the B.A. and M.A. programs at her department. In collaboration with professionals she has established the forum for critical thinking for front-line social workers. Among her publications on critical social work she co-edited a collection of essays in Hebrew, Critical Theory in Action: Critical Practices in the Social Sphere in Israel (2020, Resling).

=== The Israeli Center for Qualitative Research of People and Societies ===
Krumer-Nevo joined the Israeli Center for Qualitative Research of People and Societies at Ben-Gurion University of the Negev on its inception in 2000, and was its director from 2006 to 2016. Among her publications on qualitative inquiry are three co-edited books in Hebrew: Qualitative Data Analysis (2010, Ben-Gurion University Press); The Limits of Quantification: Critical Perspective on Measurement and Grading (2010, Ben-Gurion University Press); and Feminist Research Methodologies (2014, Hakibutz Hameuchad Publications).

== Awards and honors ==
Krumer-Nevo received a prize in 2014for her engagement in social change from the Minister of Welfare and Social Services. In 2019 she received the Lifetime Achievement Award for an outstanding contribution to social policy, from the European Social Policy Association Net-Israel (Espanet-Israel). In an announcement it released, Espanet noted Krumer-Nevo's i work in developing and implementing the Poverty-Aware Social Work paradigm. In the same year she received a Ministry of Welfare Award for Outstanding Contribution to Social Work and the Welfare State.

== Personal life ==
Krumer-Nevo is married to Gideon Nevo and they have two sons.
