= Alison Lambert =

British musician

Alison Lambert (born October 1977 in UK) is a British clarinettist.

== Biography ==
Alison studied clarinet at the Royal Northern College of Music where she was a major scholarship recipient, before accepting a scholarship to study with Professor Wolfgang Meyer in Karlsruhe, Germany. Upon graduation she moved to Israel to take up the position of Principal Bass Clarinet with the Jerusalem Symphony Orchestra with whom she toured extensively, also regularly broadcasting live on Israeli television and radio. Successive international tours include Schleswig-Holstein Musik Festival and Salzburg Music Festival.

Alison is Principal Clarinet of the English Symphony Orchestra and Longborough Festival Opera and performs regularly with the BBC National Orchestra of Wales and as clarinettist for the Royal Shakespeare Company. She has performed as a soloist with the Hallé Orchestra, Jerusalem Hillel Orchestra, Baden-Baden Philharmonic Orchestra and Collegium Musicum Heidelberg. Broadcasts include a Radio 3 Live performance of Magnus Lindberg's Clarinet Quintet as well as orchestral appearances at the BBC Proms.

Together with her duo partner, Adam Johnson, Alison has been performing repertoire both traditional and contemporary for the last 20 years. Festival performances include Ludwigsburg Festival Germany, Criccieth Festival Wales and Impuls Festival of Contemporary Music Austria. In the U.K performances include Bath Recital Artists' Trust, Cheltenham Music Society, Jacqueline du Pré Centre Oxford and St. Martin-in-the-Fields London

Alison has been clarinet tutor at the Royal Welsh College of Music & Drama since September 2003.
