= Jona Rosenfeld =

Israeli social worker and academic (1922–2023)

Jona Michael Rosenfeld
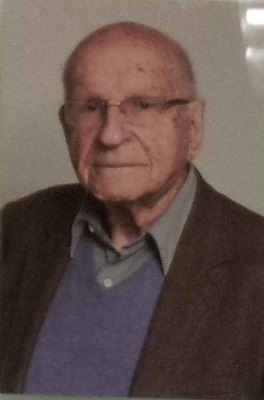
- A sign commemorating Jona Rosenfeld at the entrance to the School of Social Work on the Mount Scopus campus of the Hebrew University of Jerusalem
- Born: 30 November 1922; Karlsruhe, Germany
- Died: 26 December 2023 (aged 101); Israel
- Education: London School of Economics; Hebrew University of Jerusalem (BA); University of Chicago (PhD)
- Occupations: Social worker, social work researcher, academic
- Employer(s): Hebrew University of Jerusalem; Myers-JDC-Brookdale Institute
- Known for: Developing and promoting Learning from Success
- Notable work: Artisans of Democracy (2000); From Exclusion to Reciprocity (2016)
- Awards: Israel Prize (1998)

Jona Michael Rosenfeld (1922–2023) was an Israeli social worker, social work researcher and academic. He was a professor at the Hebrew University of Jerusalem and received the Israel Prize for social work research in 1998. His work focused on social work, poverty, social exclusion, and partnerships between professionals and people receiving social services.

Rosenfeld developed the approach known as Learning from Success, which examines successful professional experiences to identify knowledge and practices that can inform future work. He established and directed a unit devoted to this approach at the Myers-JDC-Brookdale Institute in Israel.

== Early life and education ==
Rosenfeld was born in Karlsruhe, Germany, in 1922. His family left Germany for Mandatory Palestine in 1933, following the rise of Nazi Germany. He attended school in Palestine and later worked on a kibbutz. During the 1948 Arab–Israeli War, he served in the Israeli military as a mental health officer. In this role, he worked with soldiers affected by the experiences of war and the Holocaust.

He studied at the London School of Economics, where he received certificates in social sciences and mental health. He later studied sociology and education at the Hebrew University of Jerusalem and completed a PhD at the University of Chicago in 1962.

Rosenfeld recounted his life and professional development in his 2016 autobiography, *From Exclusion to Reciprocity: "Learning from Success"*, written with Jean-Michel Defromont. The book covers his childhood in Germany, immigration to Palestine, education and career in social work, as well as the development of his approach to Learning from Success.

== Academic and professional career ==
Rosenfeld joined the faculty of the Hebrew University's Paul Baerwald School of Social Work and Social Welfare in 1961. He became a senior lecturer in 1967, an associate professor in 1973 and a professor in 1986. He was named professor emeritus in 1991. He also served as dean of the school from 1974 to 1979.

His academic interests included social work practice, partnerships between families and service organizations, extreme poverty, children experiencing neglect, and the development of professional practices responsive to the needs of service users.

The University of Chicago's 2012 alumni profile described Rosenfeld's work with people affected by poverty and persecution and his efforts to improve social services in Israel. It reported that he had published more than 100 works and had helped establish professional organizations in the Israeli social work field.

Rosenfeld also worked with organizations concerned with poverty and social exclusion, including the international ATD Fourth World movement. His work emphasized the knowledge and capabilities of people living in poverty and the importance of involving them in the development of social services.

== Learning from Success ==
Rosenfeld developed the approach known as Learning from Success (LFS), a method of organizational and professional learning based on examining successful experiences. Rather than focusing exclusively on failures or problems, the approach investigates what professionals and organizations did in situations where their work produced positive results. The process seeks to identify the knowledge, actions and conditions that contributed to those results, so that they can inform future practice.

In 1991, the Myers-JDC-Brookdale Institute established its Unit for Learning from Success and Ongoing Collaborative Learning in Human Service Organizations. Rosenfeld led the unit until his retirement at the end of 2017. The approach was used in social services and education, including work with schools and public organizations in Israel.

One application was a collaboration with the Amin programme "Lights to Employment" in Jerusalem. The project, which began in 2006, documented successful employment-related practices and examined the principles that could be learned from them. The Myers-JDC-Brookdale Institute published the resulting research report in 2009.

== Work on poverty and social exclusion ==
A recurring concern in Rosenfeld's work was the exclusion of people living in extreme poverty from social institutions and services. He emphasized professional relationships based on partnership, in which people receiving services are recognized as contributors of knowledge rather than only as recipients of assistance.

In 2000, Rosenfeld and Bruno Tardieu published Artisans of Democracy: How Ordinary People, Families in Extreme Poverty, and Social Institutions Become Allies to Overcome Social Exclusion. The book examined cooperation between families experiencing poverty and social institutions, drawing on experiences associated with the ATD Fourth World movement.

In 2017, Rosenfeld published From Exclusion to Reciprocity: Learning from Success, written in dialogue with Jean-Michel Defromont. The book combined autobiographical material with reflections on social work, exclusion and the development of Learning from Success.

Social work scholar Roni Strier reviewed the book in the journal Social Security in 2018. The review described Rosenfeld as one of the founding figures of social work in Israel and discussed the relationship between his professional life and the ideas presented in the book.

== Recognition ==
In 1998, Rosenfeld received the Israel Prize for social work research. He was the first recipient of the prize in this field.

In 2011, he received the Edith Abbott Award from the University of Chicago's School of Social Service Administration, in recognition of his professional contributions.

== Selected publications ==
- Rosenfeld, Jona M. (1997). "Learning from Successes – How to Create Social Work Suitable for its Purpose". Society and Welfare, 17(4), 361–377.
- Rosenfeld, Jona M., and Bruno Tardieu (2000). Artisans of Democracy: How Ordinary People, Families in Extreme Poverty, and Social Institutions Become Allies to Overcome Social Exclusion. University Press of America.
- Rosenfeld, Jona M., Donald A. Schön, and Israel J. Sykes (1995). Out from Under: Lessons from Projects for Inaptly Served Children and Families. JDC-Israel and Myers-JDC-Brookdale Institute.
- Rosenfeld, Jona M.; Rosenberg, Lior; Elek, Frida (2009). Learning from Success: Its Implications for the "Lights to Employment" Program of Amin: Documented Success as a Source of Principles of Action that Promote Employment, 2006–2008. Myers-JDC-Brookdale Institute. Research Report RR-534-09. Read the report (PDF).
- Rosenfeld, Jona M. (2017). From Exclusion to Reciprocity: Learning from Success. In Dialogue with Jean-Michel Defromont. Hamilton Books.

== Death ==
Rosenfeld died in 2023, aged 101.
