= Chaim Navon =

Israeli rabbi, philosopher, writer and publicist

Rabbi Chaim Navon חיים נבון
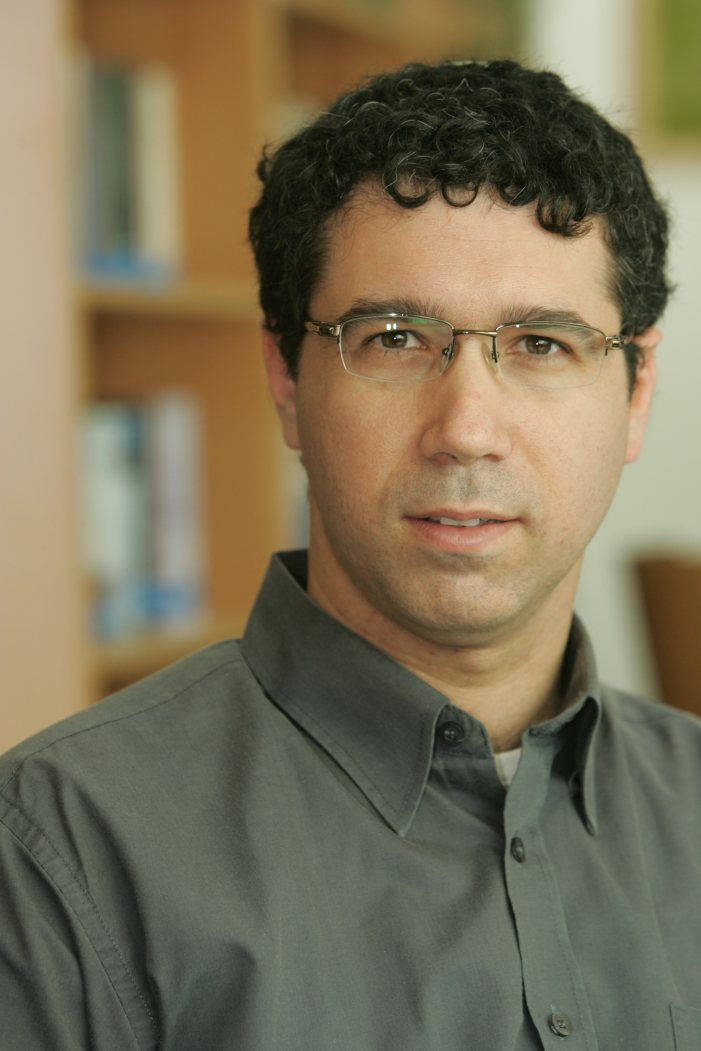
- Rabbi Chaim Navon
- Title: Israeli rabbi, thinker, writer, and publicist

Personal life
- Born: 25 June 1973 (age 53) Ramat Gan

Religious life
- Religion: Judaism
- Denomination: Religious Zionism, Orthodox

Chaim Navon (Hebrew: חיים נבון; born June 25, 1973) is an Israeli rabbi, philosopher, writer, and publicist.

== Biography ==
Chaim Navon was born in Ramat Gan and grew up in Elkana. From 1992 to 2004, Navon studied at Yeshivat Har Etzion. He received his Semicha (rabbinic ordination) from Rabbi Aharon Lichtenstein and the Chief Rabbinate of Israel. In 2004, he graduated from the Hebrew University in Jerusalem with a degree in Jewish philosophy. Navon lives in Modi'in, where he led a local congregation.

== Pedagogic, rabbinic and media career ==
Navon teaches Jewish philosophy, bible, Talmud, and Halakha (Jewish law) in at Yeshivat Har Etzion, Midreshet Lindenbaum, the Midrasha of Bar Ilan University and the Nishmat Center for Advanced Torah Study for Women.

Navon is a member of Tzohar, an organization that seeks to bridge the gaps between religious and secular Jews in Israel.

Navon is a frequent lecturer and writes a weekly column for Makor Rishon, which is identified with Israel's Religious Zionist community.

Navon has edited and translated books by Aharon Lichtenstein and Joseph B. Soloveitchik.

Navon hosts the podcast "One Might Think" (Efshar Lakhshov), which deals with religion, conservatism and public policy. His guests on the podcast have included Israeli Supreme Court justice Noam Sohlberg and journalist Sivan Rahav-Meir.

== Views and opinions ==
Navon believes that religious Zionism no longer has a single, unifying center of gravity and is facing dramatic processes of ideological change. He describes Haredi society as a "victim of its own success. The social and ideological structure that unprecedentedly magnified a small group of several hundred families and created a dizzying success story can no longer maintain tens of thousands of families. The question is how to translate Haredi success into a new communal structure, which will no longer take the form of a closed religious order." Navon is critical of the phenomenon of "political correctness" and seeks an alternative based on Jewish values. He laments the loss of desire to mirror the religious behavior of one's grandparents, attributing it to an absence of religious self–confidence. He critiques both liberals trying to change religious practice and reactionaries seeking greater stringency.

== Published works ==
Navon is the author of 3 novels and 15 non-fiction books Jewish religious thought.

- "The Good Fence: Meaning of Halacha Nowadays", Yedioth Sfarim, 2011, Tel Aviv
- "Parashot", Maaliyot, 2005, Ma'ale Adumim
- "Caught in the Thicket: Introduction to the thought of Rav J.B. Soloveitchik", Maaliyot, 2006, Ma'ale Adumim
- "831", Yedioth Books, 2010, Tel Aviv
- "A Bridge for Jacob's Daughters: Women in Judaism – Past and Future", Yedioth Books, 2011, Tel Aviv
- "Genesis and Jewish Thought", KTAV Publishing House, New Jersey 2008
- "Eve Did Not Eat an Apple:101 common mistakes about Judaism", Yedioth Books, 2012, Tel Aviv
- "Walking on Fish", Yedioth Books, 2013, Tel Aviv
- "Tayku: 101 Great Jewish Controversies", Yedioth Books, 2014, Tel Aviv
- "Jewish Laws of Blessings", Yedioth Books, 2015, Tel Aviv
- "Homework: Rav Soloveitchik on Partnership, Sexuality and Family Today", Yedioth Books, 2016, Tel Aviv
- "Striking Roots: Jewish Criticism on Postmodern Deconstruction", Yedioth Books, 2018, Tel Aviv
- "Incorrect: A Jewish Alternative to Political Correctness", Yedioth Books, 2022, Tel Aviv
- "Small State to a Great Nation", Yedioth Books, 2021, Tel Aviv
- "Freedom Is", Yedioth Books, 2019, Tel Aviv
- "Close Fight", Yedioth Books, 2023, Tel Aviv
- "Get Old", Yedioth Books, 2024, Tel Aviv
- "A Tale of a Tzadik and a Stretcher: The Life Stories of the martyrs of the Hesder yeshivot, in the first year of the Shemini Atzeret War", Yedioth Books, 2025, Tel Aviv (Hebrew and English)
