= Wolfgang Meyer =

German clarinetist and professor (1954–2019)

- Wolfgang Meyer, c. 2004

Background information
- Born: 13 August 1954; Crailsheim, Baden-Württemberg, West Germany
- Died: 17 March 2019 (aged 64) Karlsruhe, Baden-Württemberg, Germany
- Genre: Classical
- Instrument: clarinet

Wolfgang Meyer (13 August 1954 – 17 March 2019) was a German clarinetist and professor of clarinet at the Musikhochschule Karlsruhe. He worked internationally as a soloist, in chamber music ensembles, and in jazz, with a repertoire from early music played on historical instruments to world premieres.

== Career ==
Meyer studied clarinet with Otto Hermann at the Staatliche Hochschule für Musik in Stuttgart from 1968 to 1972, and then with Hans Deinzer at the Hochschule für Musik und Theater Hannover, until 1978. He studied along with his sister Sabine Meyer, with whom he also maintained a lifelong partnership professionally. In 1975, he won the ARD International Music Competition in the category chamber music with the Syrinx Quintet.

Meyer played as a soloist with a focus on contemporary music, including world premieres. In 1991, Jean Françaix dedicated his Double concerto pour flûte, clarinette et orchestre to flautist Dagmar Becker and Meyer. In 2008, he played the premiere of the work Levitation, which Peter Eötvös had composed for his sister and him. He played earlier music on historical instruments, including a recording of Mozart's Clarinet Concerto with Nikolaus Harnoncourt. He was a member of the chamber music ensembles Trio di Clarone (with his sister and his brother-in-law Reiner Wehle), and the Zemlinsky Trio, and played with the Carmina Quartett and the Quatuor Mosaïques.

Meyer was professor of clarinet at the Musikhochschule Karlsruhe from 1989 until 2016, serving as its director from 2001 to 2007. Among his students were Alexander Bader and Alison Lambert. He led masterclasses in Brazil, Canada, Finland, Italy and Japan.

He often played with jazz saxophonist Peter Lehel, recording six albums. In 2009, Meyer founded an association, KlangKunst in der Hemingway Lounge, to promote concerts of different genres in Karlsruhe. He played his last concert there with Lehel on 7 February 2019. Meyer died of cancer at his home in Karlsruhe on 17 March 2019.

== Recordings ==
Meyer recorded as a soloist and in chamber music and jazz ensembles. In 1990, he recorded Messiaen's Quatuor pour la fin du temps with violinist Christoph Poppen, cellist Manuel Fischer-Dieskau, and pianist Yvonne Loriod. In 1993, he recorded chamber music by Mozart, his Clarinet Quintet with Quatuor Mosaïques and the Kegelstatt Trio with violinist Anita Mitterer and pianist Patrick Cohen, using a period basset clarinet as Anton Stadler, for whom Mozart wrote the works, would have used; a reviewer of Gramophone noted his "very full, rounded, beautiful tone", "always perfectly tuned and with extremely light articulation." In 2004, he recorded sonatas which Johannes Brahms composed for clarinet or viola, on a CD comparing the same works in both versions, with violist Pierre-Henri Xuereb and pianist André de Groote. A reviewer noted that he began "in a measured but beautiful fashion, evidently showing all his understanding of the clarinet". In a 2007 collection of Mozart concertos with the Concentus Musicus Wien conducted by Nikolaus Harnoncourt, Meyer played the Clarinet Concerto. A reviewer described his "beautifully rounded, velvety tone", imaginative phrasing and capturing of the work's "undertow of melancholy".

Recordings by Meyer are held by the German National Library, including:

- Schumann, Bruch, chamber music with Sabine Meyer, Reiner Wehle and pianist Kalle Randalu. Cavi-Music, 2008.
- Charles Uzor: Quartets; Quintet. Neos, 2008. (OCLC 906562644)
- Mozart: Clarinet Concerto; Oboe Concerto; Concerto for flute and harp, with Concentus Musicus Wien. Warner Classics, 2007.
- Classique & Zen, with Anne Gastinel, Philippe Jaroussky and Ensemble Kapsberger. Naive, 2007.
- Brahms: 2 Sonatas Op. 120 for Clarinet and Viola with Piano, with Andre de Groote and Pierre-Henri Xuereb. Classic Talent, 2007.
- Salieri, Danzi, Pleyel: Sinfonia Concertante, with the Wurttemberg Chamber Orchestra. MD&G, 2002.
- Homage to Benny Goodman, with Sabine Meyer and the Bamberg Symphony Chorus. EMI, 2000. (OCLC 840327994)
- The Clarinet at the Opera, with the Polish Radio Symphony Orchestra and Chorus Kraków. Classic Talent, 1999.
- Maria Venuti Sings Schubert, Schoenberg, Schumann, with Charles Spencer and Maria Venuti. Hänssler Classics, 1995.
- Mozart: Clarinet Quintet, with Quatuor Mosaïques, Patrick Cohen, and Anita Mitterer. Valois, 1993.
- Messiaen: Turangalîla-Symphonie; Quatuor pour la fin du temps, with the London Symphony Orchestra. EMI Classics, 1990.
