= Eli Eban =

Israeli-American musician

Eli Eban (Hebrew: עלי אבן; born 17 January 1950) is an Israeli-American clarinetist and son of the late Israeli diplomat Abba Eban.

== Education ==
Eli Eban was born in New York City and received his early musical training in Israel, studying the clarinet with Richard Lesser and Yona Ettlinger. After serving in the Israeli Army, he was accepted into the Curtis Institute of Music, Philadelphia, where he studied with Anthony Gigliotti.

== Performance career ==
Immediately upon graduation, he was appointed principal clarinetist of the Israel Radio Symphony under Lukas Foss. Shortly thereafter he was invited by Zubin Mehta to join the Israel Philharmonic Orchestra, where he spent thirteen seasons playing and recording all the major orchestral repertoire under internationally renowned conductors such as Claudio Abbado, Daniel Barenboim, Leonard Bernstein, Christoph von Dohnanyi, Christoph Eschenbach, James Levine, Kurt Masur, Sir Simon Rattle, Sir Georg Solti, and Klaus Tennstedt. He performed as soloist with the Israel Philharmonic Orchestra on many occasions, and has also appeared as soloist with the English Chamber Orchestra at the Barbican Center, the City of London Sinfonia at Royal Festival Hall, the Salzburg Camerata, the Philadelphia Chamber Orchestra, the Israel Camerata Jerusalem, the Indianapolis Chamber Orchestra, and the Louisville Orchestra, among others.

Mr. Eban tours extensively as a chamber musician, collaborating with world-renowned artists and ensembles. He has been guest artist with the Alexander, Audubon, Orion, St. Petersburg, Tel Aviv and Ying Quartets, and was a frequent participant of the Marlboro Music Festival in Vermont. While at Marlboro, he was invited by legendary Hungarian violinist Sandor Vegh to perform at the Prussia Cove festival in England, where he drew critical acclaim from The Guardian for his "high-powered, electrifying performances". His subsequent recordings for Meridian Records, London, were cited by the Penguin Guide To CDs as being "full of life and highly sensitive." He has also recorded for the Saphir, Crystal and Naxos labels. Mr. Eban was a member of Myriad, (a chamber ensemble formed by members of the Cleveland Orchestra) for seven years, and has often traveled to Eastern Europe to perform and teach as a visiting artist of the European Mozart Foundation. He divides his time between teaching at Indiana University, performing with the Indianapolis Chamber Orchestra, and touring as a soloist and chamber musician. His summers are spent performing and teaching at the Sarasota Music Festival and playing principal clarinet in the Chautauqua Symphony Orchestra. Recent engagements include a world tour as acting principal clarinetist with the Israel Philharmonic Orchestra directed by Lorin Maazel, and critically acclaimed performances at London's Wigmore Hall.

== Teaching career ==
Eli Eban was visiting professor of clarinet at the Eastman School of Music before joining the faculty of the Indiana University Jacobs School of Music in 1990.
