= Scharoun Ensemble =

German chamber music group

The Scharoun Ensemble is a German chamber music group, consisting of members of the Berliner Philharmoniker. The repertoire ranges from baroque to contemporary music.

== Background and history ==
The Scharoun Ensemble Berlin was founded in 1983 by members of the Berliner Philharmoniker. The group made its public debut with Schubert's Octet in F major D. 803. The ensemble is named after architect Hans Scharoun, designer of the Berliner Philharmonie. The permanent core of the ensemble is a standard octet comprising clarinet, horn, bassoon, two violins, viola, cello and double bass. Since 2005, the annually Zermatt Festival is organized by and around the Scharoun Ensemble.

== Members ==
- Alexander Bader, clarinet
- Markus Weidmann, bassoon
- Stefan de Leval Jezierski, horn (co-founder)
- Wolfram Brandl, violin
- Rachel Schmidt, violin
- Christophe Horak, violin
- Micha Afkham, viola
- Richard Duven, cello
- Peter Riegelbauer, double bass (co-founder)

== Awards ==
- 2012 International Classical Music Awards (Chamber Music) for Beethoven: Septet op. 20, Sextet op. 71. Tudor 2011

== Discography ==
- Schubert: Octet D. 803. Tudor, 2002
- Mozart, Brahms: Clarinet Quintets. With Karl-Heinz Steffens. Tudor, 2007
- Frank Martin: Le Vin herbé. With Daniel Reuss, RIAS Chamber Choir. Harmonia Mundi, 2007
- Beethoven: Septet op. 20, Sextet op. 71. Tudor, 2011
- Dvořák: Bagatelles Op. 47, Terzetto Op. 74, String Quintet Op. 77. Tudor, 2015
- Hans Werner Henze: Kammermusik 1958 "In lieblicher Bläue", Neue Volkslieder und Hirtengesänge. With Andrew Staples, Markus Weidmann, Jürgen Ruck, Daniel Harding. Tudor, 2017
- Schubert: Octet D 803, PENTATONE, 2026
