= Robert Lindemann =

- Origin: Paderborn, Germany
- Genres: 20th-century classical music
- Instrument: Clarinet
- Years active: 1911–1949

Robert Lindemann (January 28, 1884, in Paderborn, Germany – October 1975) was a German-American clarinetist.

Lindemann emigrated to the United States in September 1911, settling first in Minneapolis. He was the solo clarinetist for the Minneapolis Symphony Orchestra for two years. He then moved to Philadelphia and performed as solo clarinetist in the Philadelphia Orchestra for four years, from 1913 to 1917. Lindemann then became principal clarinetist of the New York Symphony for five years. During his tenure in New York City, he participated in the American premiere of Arnold Schoenberg's Pierrot Lunaire in February 1923. That performance was the subject of a growing dispute surrounding modernist music; it received mixed reviews, being alternately praised and criticized, and was considered to be controversial.

Lindemann moved to Illinois and was principal clarinetist for the Chicago Symphony Orchestra for 26 years, from 1923 to 1949. He was replaced by Mitchell Lurie after he retired in 1949. He also played in the Chicago Woodwind Quintet during the 1930s. Lindemann used German (Oehler system) clarinets with custom-made mouthpieces. He taught clarinet privately after his retirement from the orchestra; author and teacher Keith Stein was one of his students. Unlike most prominent clarinet teachers of the time, he did not produce his own instrumental method book. He died in Everett, Washington in October 1975, at age 91.
