= Nicola Bulfone =

Italian clarinetist

Nicola Bulfone is an Italian clarinetist.

Bulfone was born in 1963 in Hässleholm, Sweden, and studied clarinet at the Udine Conservatory. From 1985 to 1988 he studied at the Hochschule für Musik in Stuttgart under Ulf Rodenhäuser, winning an Advanced Diploma in clarinet. He won first prize in the 1983 International Music Competition in Stresa.

Bulfone has played clarinet, basset horn and bass clarinet in the Teatro alla Scala Orchestra, the Teatro G. Verdi Orchestra, Trieste, the San Remo Symphony Orchestra, Filarmonica della Scala, Teatro La Fenice in Venice, and Teatro San Carlo in Naples. He played as soloist with the Slovac Philharmonic Orchestra of Bratislava, the Rossini Festival Orchestra, the Udine Chamber Orchestra, the Orchestra Sinfonica del Estado del Mexico, the Udine Philharmonic Orchestra, the Orquesta do Norte, and several chamber orchestras. From 1994 until 2006, he taught clarinet at Gallarate Conservatory.

Bulfone has recorded three CDs for Agorà and created the first ever recording of the concertos for clarinet and orchestra by Carlo Paessler. He plays on a Wurlitzer Reform-Boehm clarinet.

== Discography ==
- Franz Vincenz Krommer/Felix Mendelssohn Bartholdy: Concertos For 2 Clarinets, with Daniel Pacitti and the Udine Chamber Orchestra. Agorà, 1996.
- Carlo Paessler: Works for Clarinet and Orchestra, with the Collegium Musicum. Agorà, 2001.
