= Jon Manasse =

American clarinetist

Jon Manasse /məˈnæsi/ is an American clarinetist.

Manasse studied clarinet at the Juilliard School under David Weber. He won a prize in the International Competition for Clarinet in Munich and was the youngest winner of the International Clarinet Society Competition.

Manasse has performed at the Lincoln Center in New York, Columbia University and Rockefeller University. He has toured in Japan and southeast Asia with the New York Symphonic Ensemble and has played in Jerusalem, Tel Aviv and Osaka. He has been a guest soloist with the National Philharmonic, Symphony Nova Scotia, National Chamber Orchestra, New York Philharmonic, and the orchestras of Alabama, Annapolis, Bozeman, Dubuque, Evansville, Florida West Coast, Green Bay, Indianapolis, Jackson, Oakland East Bay, Pensacola, Princeton, and Richmond. He has also been the guest principal clarinetist of the New York Pops Orchestra, Orpheus Chamber Orchestra, New Jersey Symphony Orchestra, St. Louis Symphony Orchestra and Seattle Symphony Orchestra. He was also a member of the New York Chamber Symphony and the Metropolitan Opera Orchestra.

Manasse plays with the Stamford Symphony Orchestra, and is the principal clarinetist of the American Ballet Theatre Orchestra and the Mostly Mozart Festival Orchestra. He became the principal clarinetist of the Orchestra of St. Luke's in 2008. Manasse and his duo-partner, the pianist Jon Nakamatsu, are artistic directors of the Cape Cod Chamber Music Festival. Manasse is a Yamaha and Vandoren Performing Artist. He has been an associate professor of clarinet at the Eastman School of Music since 1995, a faculty member of Juilliard School in 2007, and a distinguished artist in residence at Lynn University's Conservatory of Music since 2008 in Boca Raton, Florida.

== Discography ==
- Weber: The Complete Clarinet Music, Vol. 1 & 2, with Samuel Sanders and the Manhattan String Quartet. XLNT Music, 1989-1990
- Jon Manasse Plays Clarinet Music From 3 Centuries, with the Shanghai Quartet and XLNT Sinfonietta. XLNT Music, 1994
- Jon Manasse Plays Clarinet Music From 3 Centuries, with the Shanghai Quartet and XLNT Sinfonietta. XLNT Music, 1994
- Jon Manasse plays 3 Clarinet Concertos, with the Slovak Radio Symphony Orchestra. XLNT Music, 2004
- Lowell Liebermann: Quintets; Six Songs, with various artists. Koch International Classics, 2008
- Brahms Clarinet Sonatas, with Jon Nakamatsu. Harmonia Mundi USA, 2008
- American Music for Clarinet and Piano, with Jon Nakamatsu, including works by Bernstein, D'Rivera, Gershwin and Novacek. Harmonia Mundi USA, 2010
- Johannes Brahms: Quintets opp.34 & 115, Jon Nakamatsu, Jon Manasse, Tokyo String Quartet, Harmonia Mundi, 2012
