= Radovan Cavallin =

Croatian clarinetist and professor

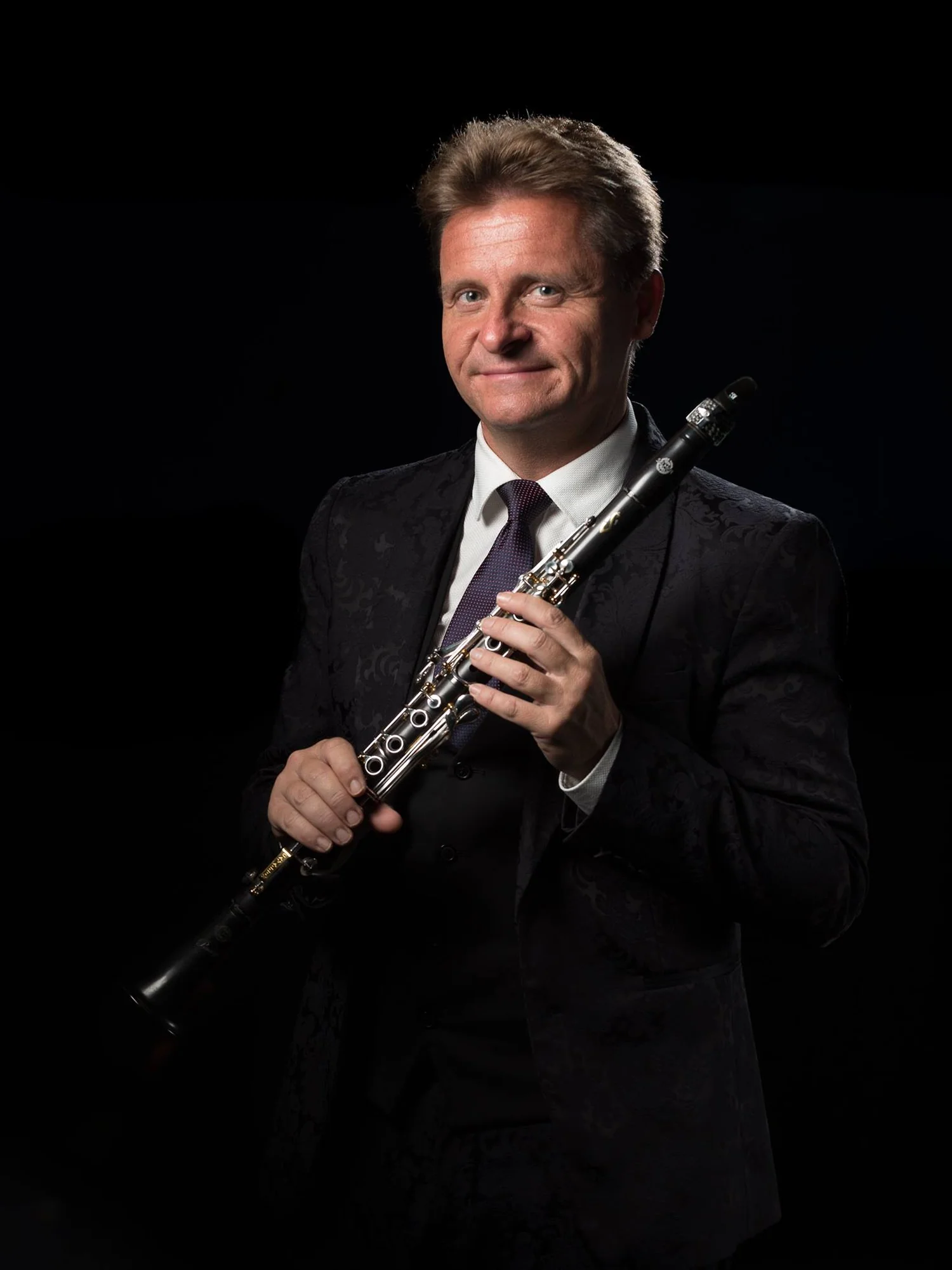
- Born: January 20, 1969 (age 57); Zagreb, Croatia
- Occupations: Classical clarinetist; Academic teacher
- Years active: 1989–present
- Organizations: Orquesta Filarmónica de Gran Canaria
- Awards: First Prize, National Clarinet Competition of Yugoslavia; First Prize, International Clarinet Competition, Ancona, Italy

Radovan Cavallin (born 20 January 1969) is a Croatian clarinetist, professor, and chamber musician. He is principal clarinet of the Gran Canaria Philharmonic Orchestra (OFGC) and a clarinet professor at the orchestra's academy. Cavallin has performed internationally as a soloist and chamber musician and is known for his interpretations of both classical and contemporary clarinet repertoire.

== Early life and education ==
Cavallin began studying clarinet at the age of nine. At thirteen, he became the youngest student ever admitted to the Academy of Music at the University of Zagreb, where he graduated with distinction in 1986.

He later studied at the Conservatoire de Paris (CNSMDP), having been selected from among seventy-six applicants. There he earned the Premier Prix in Chamber Music (1988, class of Christian Lardé) and the Premier Prix in Clarinet (1989, class of Guy Deplus), both unanimously awarded.

His studies were supported by several scholarships:

- 1986 – Ivo Pogorelich Scholarship
- 1987 – Nadia and Lily Boulanger Scholarship
- 1988–1989 – French Government Scholarships

== Career ==
Since 1989, Cavallin has served as principal clarinet of the Orquesta Filarmónica de Gran Canaria. He has performed as a soloist with orchestras across Europe, Asia, and the Americas, including:

- Zagreb Philharmonic Orchestra
- Zagreb Soloists
- Orchestra of Belgrade
- Sinfonia Varsovia
- Orchestre National de Gottwaldov
- Orchestra del Teatro Bologna
- Philharmonic Orchestra of Gran Canaria
- Las Palmas Symphony Orchestra
- Béla Bartók Chamber Orchestra
- Orchestre Franco-Belge de Bruxelles
- Extremadura Orchestra
- Dubrovnik Symphony Orchestra
- Opera Orchestra of Rijeka
- St. Giles Orchestra (Oxford)

He has performed concertos by composers such as Jean Françaix, Wolfgang Amadeus Mozart, Carl Nielsen, Charles Villiers Stanford, Aaron Copland, Carl Maria von Weber, Henri Tomasi, Tōru Takemitsu, Franz Danzi, Richard Strauss, Max Bruch, Franz Krommer, Claude Debussy, Philippe Leloup, Fernando Palacios, and Ante Grgin.

In 2011, Cavallin appeared as a soloist with Sting on the Symphonicity tour at the Estadio de Gran Canaria. He has performed at festivals in Ferrara (Italy), Dubrovnik (Croatia), Bad Hersfeld, Germany, La Orotava (Tenerife), Brussels (Belgium), Lisbon (Portugal), Ibagué (Colombia), Lanzhou (China), and Baton Rouge (US).

=== Chamber music ===
Cavallin is a founding member of several chamber ensembles, including:

- Atlantis Quartet
- Trio Spohr
- Reinecke Quartet
- Alisios Camerata

With Alisios Camerata he has toured internationally, including a series of concerts in Japan.

== Teaching and festivals ==
Cavallin has given over sixty master classes worldwide and has served as a juror in clarinet competitions in Spain, Croatia, Portugal, and the United States.

He is artistic director of the Gran Canaria International Clarinet Festival and the Virovitica International Musical Meeting (VIMM) in Croatia. He has also taught at the Quintanar de la Orden (Toledo) and at the International Clarinet Course “Julián Menéndez” in Ávila, Spain.

From 2002 to 2010, he was professor of clarinet, chamber music, and orchestral repertoire at the Conservatorio Superior de Música de Las Palmas.

== Awards ==
- 1981, 1983, 1985, 1986 – First Prize, National Clarinet Competition of Yugoslavia
- 1984 – First Prize, International Clarinet Competition, Ancona, Italy
- 1995 – Second Prize, International Clarinet Competition Dos Hermanas, Seville, Spain

== Recordings ==
Cavallin's discography includes releases on Yugoton, Croatia Records, BMG Arte Nova, Maguelone, AgrupArte Productions, Cristal Records, Summit Records, and ASV. Selected recordings:

- Françaix / Mozart: Concertos for Clarinet – Philharmonic Orchestra Gran Canaria (Maguelone)
- Horn Trios by Brahms, Reinecke, Duvernoy – Crystal Records
- Heitor Villa-Lobos: Chôros 1–7 – ASV
- Miniaturas: Chamber Music by Nino Díaz – Venue
- 11 per 1 In 1 – Croatia Records (2017)

== Instruments ==
Cavallin performs on Henri SELMER Paris "Privilège" clarinets.
