= Francisco Forteza =

Uruguayan politician (1892–1967)

Francisco Forteza (1892–1967) was a Uruguayan political figure.

== Background ==
He was a medical doctor by profession. He was a prominent member of the Uruguayan Colorado Party. His son Francisco Forteza (son) served as a Deputy, Senator, Minister of Economy and Finance and Interior Minister.

== Public offices ==
Forteza was elected as a deputy in the Chamber of Representatives in 1926. He later served in the Senate of Uruguay.

Exiled during the presidency of Gabriel Terra, he later returned to serve in a number of ministerial portfolios in post-WW2 governments: Public Health (1945–1946), Education (1947) and Defence (1947–1951).

He was the president of Banco de la República Oriental del Uruguay from 1955 to 1958.

== Death ==
He died in 1967.

== See also ==
- Politics of Uruguay
- List of political families
