= Ferdinand Capelle =

French composer, clarinetist and conductor

Ferdinand CAPELLE, 1905

Ferdinand Capelle (24 April 1883 – 15 October 1942) was a French composer, clarinetist and conductor.

Born in Neuf-Berquin, Capelle studied music at the Conservatoire de Paris where he obtained a first prize in clarinet. He was then professor at the conservatory of Roubaix, where he conducted the harmony orchestra, before that of Merville in 1912. He became clarinet teacher at the Conservatoire de Lille, and directed its harmony in 1936. He composed the music for several songs with Gérard Delaeter as lyricist. He died of illness on 15 October 1942. In particular, he published 20 Grandes études pour clarinette.
