= Chen Halevi =

Israeli clarinetist

Chen Halevi (Hebrew: חן הלוי) is an Israeli clarinetist and a native of the Negev desert. He studied clarinet with Yitzchak Kazap and Richard Lesser, then later went on to study chamber music with Mordechai Rechtman and Chaim Taub.

== Debut ==
Halevi debuted with the Israel Philharmonic Orchestra under the baton of Zubin Mehta. He has since performed with several orchestras across the world, including the Israel Philharmonic Orchestra, the Tokyo Symphony Orchestra, the European Soloists, the Heilbronn Chamber Orchestra, the Moscow Virtuosi, the Jerusalem Radio Orchestra, the MDR Philharmonic Leipzig, the NDR Sinfonieorchester Hamburg, and the Deutsche Symphonie-Orchester Berlin.

== Career ==
Halevi is one of the leading virtuoso clarinetists—playing recitals, concertos, and chamber music. He is known for a repertoire ranging from contemporary music to early music on authentic ‘period’ instruments. Haaretz wrote, “This boy is blessed with a fusion of artistic musicality and playing technique, all in the service of the muses.”

A frequent participant in summer festivals, Halevi has appeared at the Marlboro, Ravinia, and Santa Fe Festivals in the United States, as well as European appearances at Schleswig Holstein, Colmar, Forcalquier, Prussia Cove, Davos, Rolandseck, Aldebburgh, Verbier Chamber Music Festivals, the PMF Festival in Japan, and the Perth International Arts Festival

A great lover of chamber music, Halevi has performed with Pinchas Zukerman and Christoph Eschenbach, and numerous string quartets, including the Keller, Szymanowski, Fine arts, Miro, Prazac, St. Lawrence, Arcanto, Vogler, and Kronos Quartets. His close ties with composers have led him to perform a great number of works by, amongst others, Luciano Berio, György Kurtág, Magnus Lindberg, Osvaldo Golijov, Yan Maresz, Michael Jarrell, Brian Ferneyhough, Marco Stroppa, Bruno Mantovani and Thomas Adès. He is a dedicatee of a cycle of pieces by Denis Cohen, including Nodus for solo clarinet, Ombre for clarinet and electronics, and soft machine for clarinet and cello. Additionally, has performed Les asperges de la lune for solo clarinet by Sven-Ingo Koch, a clarinet trio by Lior Navok, and premiered Sven-Ingo Koch's Doppelgänger, a concerto for clarinet and orchestra.

== Projects and Teaching ==
Halevi is now working on a recording project presenting an anthology of 20th-century music for clarinet, the project includes his selections of the solo, chamber music, concerto, and electronic works. He is currently the Clarinet Professor at the Trossingen Hochschule fur Musik in Germany—traveling around the world to give master classes on teaching and playing. Since 2007 he has been a faculty member in the summer master classes at the Banff Centre.

In 2007, Halevi founded ClaRecords to commission, produce, and record new pieces from today's leading composers, as well as young and upcoming ones. ClaRecords also works with other modern art forms to stimulate dialogue between different modes of expression in the 21st century. In its first year, Clarecords commissioned five new pieces and made a music video in 3D computer animation.
