= Gerhard Fankhauser =

Swiss-born American embryologist (1901–1981)

- Born: 1901; Burgdorf, Switzerland
- Died: October 4, 1981 (aged 79–80); Princeton, New Jersey
- Education: University of Geneva; University of Zurich; University of Bern
- Spouse: Erna Koestler Frankhauser (m. 1931; died 1954)
- Children: 2
- Scientific career
- Fields: Embryology
- Doctoral advisor: Fritz Baltzer
- Doctoral students: Alan Humphries

Gerhard Fankhauser (1901–1981) was an embryologist known for his studies on amphibian development. He was a professor at Princeton from 1931 to 1969, where he retired as the Edwin Grant Conklin Professor of Biology.

Frankhauser was born in Burgdorf, Switzerland in 1901. He received his doctorate from the University of Bern in 1924 and came to the United States in 1929 as a Rockefeller research fellow at the University of Chicago. Fankhauser completed his doctorate under Fritz Baltzer and has trained Alan Humphries, who studied frog oocytes at Emory University.

Fankhauser taught an undergraduate course in comparative natural history and a graduate course in experimental embryology and developmental genetics.

Gerhard Fankhauser's wife, Erna Fankhauser, worked as a language instructor and died in a head-on collision on November 6, 1954.

== Research ==
Fankhauser was known for his research on the development of amphibia, particularly the effects of abnormal chromosome numbers on the production and development of embryos. His research showed that a correlation exists between the number of chromosomes and the size of a cell.

In his research on Triturus viridescens, a species of newt, Fankhauser discovered that cell size was not the determining factor in the size of an organism. In his 1945 paper, Fankhauser showed that although the nephric duct cells of polyploidy embryos are larger, the size of the duct itself remained constant Albert Einstein, a close friend of Fankhauser, was interested in his work and upon reading a reprint replied:

It is really a marvel, the living being. The fact alone that the thing can exist with the three- or four-fold chromosome number is extremely remarkable. Most peculiar, however, for me is the fact that, in spite of the enlarged single cell, the size of the animal is not correspondingly increased. It looks as if the importance of the cell as ruling element of the whole had been overestimated previously. What the real determinant of form and organization is, seems quite obscure.
