= Jacques Meertens =

Dutch clarinetist

Jacques Meertens (born 16 April 1948) is a Dutch clarinetist. He was the principal clarinetist of the Royal Concertgebouw Orchestra from September 1990 until his retirement in April 2013. He plays on a German Reform-Boehm system clarinet.

A native of Limburg, Meertens studied at the Conservatorium van Amsterdam with Bram de Wilde, who was principal clarinetist at the Concertgebouw Orchestra between 1940 and 1975. Meertens was clarinetist at the Nederlands Balletorkest and Noordhollands Philharmonisch Orkest in Haarlem before he joined the Concertgebouw Orchestra.
