= Dan St. Marseille =

American musician

Dan St. Marseille (born 1962) is an American clarinetist and saxophonist.

St. Marseille has had recordings profiled in the subject of articles in Down Beat, Jazztimes, Los Angeles Times, and Jazz Critic. He headlined at the Coleman Hawkins Festival in Topeka. He was inducted into the Saddleback Valley School District's Hall of Fame in 1999. He has a teaching studio in Southern California. He also leads the Dan St. Marseille Quartet.

St. Marseille is a Yamaha performing artist. He plays on a TS-875 saxophone, YCL-681II and YCL-CSV clarinet.
