= David Weber (clarinetist) =

Lithuanian-American classical clarinetist (1913–2006)

- Born: December 18, 1913; Vilna, Lithuania
- Died: January 23, 2006 (aged 92); New York City, U.S.
- Genres: Classical
- Instrument: Clarinet

David Weber (December 18, 1913 – January 23, 2006) was an American classical clarinetist known for the beauty of his tone, his inspired playing, and his influential teaching of the clarinet.

== Early life ==
David Weber was born in Vilna in present-day Lithuania and came to the United States in 1921. His family settled in Detroit. His parents were not musical, but he liked the sound of clarinet and took it up at the age of 11. While in high school, he studied under Roy Schmidt and Alberto Luconi, principal clarinetists of the Detroit Symphony. In 1933 Ossip Gabrilowitsch, then conductor of the Detroit Symphony, was impressed by Weber's playing and helped him get a New York Philharmonic Scholarship. This allowed Weber to study without fee in New York with Simeon Bellison, the New York Philharmonic's principal clarinetist. Around the same time he also studied with Daniel Bonade, principal clarinet with the Columbia Broadcast System Symphony.

== Career ==
=== Performance and recording ===
Weber's orchestral career began at age 25, with a 1938 audition for Arturo Toscanini, who personally hired Weber on the spot to play in the NBC Symphony. Weber played with the orchestra for two years as associate principal and e-flat clarinet, but was replaced just before the orchestra's 1940 tour of South America for a more experienced player. He instead went on to audition for Erich Leinsdorf, head of German repertoire at the Metropolitan Opera Orchestra, who awarded him the principal clarinet position, which he held from 1940–1943.

Weber went on to serve as assistant principal in the New York Philharmonic under former teacher Simeon Bellison. He held this position from 1943–1944 and took part in Leonard Bernstein's debut on November 14, 1943. He was principal clarinetist in the CBS Symphony Orchestra from 1946–1952, and then assumed the same position in the Symphony of the Air (the successor to the NBC Symphony) under Leopold Stokowski from 1954–1957. After serving as the assistant principal for several years, in 1964, he became principal clarinetist in the New York City Ballet Orchestra, a position he held until his retirement from performing in 1986. While he was a member of the orchestra, legendary choreographer Jerome Robbins created a ballet to Igor Stravinsky's Three Pieces for Solo Clarinet, featuring only Weber's playing.

Weber has been featured on many recordings. He can be heard performing the e-flat clarinet solos in Toscanini's recordings of the Daphnis and Chloe Suite No. 2 and Richard Strauss' Till Eulenspiegel's Merry Pranks. He played first clarinet in Stokowski's Symphony of the Air recordings.

In a 78 RPM set released by Musicraft Records in early 1939, Weber and pianist Ray Lev collaborated in the first recording of the Johannes Brahms Sonata in F minor, op. 120 no. 1, in its original instrumentation for clarinet and piano. In 2002, Clarinet Classics released a CD entitled "A Portrait of David Weber: A Grand Master of the Clarinet," featuring recordings of David Weber from 1946 through 1978.

=== Teaching ===
Weber, who long had an interest in teaching clarinet, devoted himself to teaching at Columbia University and the Juilliard School of Music after leaving the New York City Ballet Orchestra in 1986. Many of his students became prominent clarinetists themselves and teachers in the United States and other countries. Former students currently occupy chairs in the Cleveland Orchestra, Dallas Symphony, Rochester Philharmonic, Annapolis Symphony, and Milwaukee Symphony and include noted soloist Jon Manasse and jazz clarinetist Kenny Davern, who initially studied saxophone in the same building that Weber taught in, only to become mesmerized by the sound of the clarinet playing coming from Weber's studio. The jazz clarinetist Benny Goodman also studied under Weber, who claimed Goodman never paid him and took his best reeds.

Weber continued teaching privately until June 2005, at which point he was a robust 92 years old.

== Legacy ==
Weber was perhaps best known for the quality of his tone. According to The New York Times, "His sound was full, rich, resonant and pure." Current American Ballet Theatre principal and acclaimed recording artist Jon Manasse described his teacher's sound as having "a unique bell-like quality". Stokowski described Weber's sound as being "like a dove cooing."

Weber used a double-lip embouchure and though many of his students did not, he implored his students to strive for a "rich, liquid, legatissimo sound" that one could "reach out and touch."

== Death ==
He died in New York City.
