= Johannes Gmeinder =

German clarinetist and academic (born 1976)

Johannes Gmeinder (born 1976 in Konstanz) is a German clarinetist and academic.

Gmeinder studied clarinet at the Musikhochschule in Trossingen and Berlin. In 1996, he won a scholarship from the Orchesterakademie of the Berlin Philharmonic Orchestra. He has been the principal clarinetist of the Frankfurt Opera since 1999. In 2004, he became a professor at the Johannes Gutenberg University Mainz.
