= Lawrence Maxey =

Lawrence S. Maxey (most often Lawrence Maxey or just Larry Maxey) is professor emeritus of clarinet at the University of Kansas School of Music.

A native of Indiana, Larry Maxey was a student of Keith Stein at Michigan State University, where he received his undergraduate degree. He holds Master of Music and Doctor of Musical Arts degrees from the Eastman School of Music, where he was a student of Stanley Hasty. Maxey taught on the full-time music faculties of Baylor University, California State University at Long Beach, and Michigan State University before joining the faculty at the University of Kansas, where he taught from 1971 until retiring in 2007.

Maxey's former students at KU have gone on to earn graduate degrees at a number of prestigious institutions, including Juilliard, the Shepherd School of Music at Rice University, the University of Michigan, Michigan State University, Arizona State University, the University of Wisconsin, and University of Oregon. Several of his students have been finalists in the MTNA national competition. Other KU clarinetists hold positions in universities and professional orchestras.

Maxey has performed nationwide and internationally as a soloist, chamber musician, and orchestral player. His career has taken him to Germany, France, Belgium, Portugal, Costa Rica and Lithuania. He performed with the Stamitz Quartet at the International Festival de Musica in Portugal in 1995 and toured Lithuania in 1996 and 2004, playing concerts with orchestras as well as conducting master classes.

Maxey was formerly principal clarinetist of the Kansas City Chamber Orchestra, the Rochester (New York) Chamber Orchestra, the Eastman Philharmonia Orchestra, and the Eastman Wind Ensemble, with which he recorded five albums under the direction of Frederick Fennell and Donald Hunsberger.

Maxey has been a featured soloist at conventions of the International Clarinet Association, at two national conventions of the National Association of College Wind and Percussion Instructors, and at several Oklahoma Clarinet Symposia. He has performed as a member of the Kansas Woodwinds at national conventions of the Music Educator's National Conference (Washington, D.C., and Kansas City, Missouri), the College Music Society (Detroit, Michigan), at the Midwest Band and Orchestra Clinic in Chicago, and at numerous state music conventions in Kansas.

Recent performances include a recital on the Fontana Chamber Music Series in Michigan in the summer of 2005, a residency at the State University of New York-Oswego in October 2005, as a soloist with the KU Jazz Ensemble (University of Kansas) in Duke Ellington's arrangement of Tchaikovsky's Nutcracker Suite in November 2005. He presented a clinic at the Kansas Music Educator's convention in February 2005, and performed there in February 2006.

== Selected orchestral performances ==
- Principal Clarinet, Lawrence Symphony Orchestra, Lawrence, Kansas
- Principal Clarinet, Kansas City Chamber Orchestra, Kansas City, Missouri
- Principal Clarinet, Rochester Chamber Orchestra, Rochester, New York
- Principal Clarinet, Eastman Philharmonic Orchestra, Rochester, New York
- Principal Clarinet, Waco Civic Orchestra, Waco, Texas
- Principal Clarinet, Seventh Army Symphony Orchestra, Stuttgart, Germany

== Selected performances as soloist ==
- Baker University
- Baylor University
- Central Missouri State University
- Eastman School of Music
- East Texas State University
- Long Beach State University
- Michigan State University
- North Park College
- University of Iowa
- University of Kansas
- University of Michigan, Ann Arbor
- University of Michigan, Flint
- University of Oklahoma
- Valparaiso University
- Western Michigan University

== Selected performances—chamber music ==
- Baker University
- Eastman School of Music
- East Texas State University
- Michigan State University
- Missouri Western University
- National Museum of Art, Costa Rica
- National University, Costa Rica
- Southwest Missouri State University
- University of Costa Rica, San Jose
- University of Costa Rica, Santa Cruz
- University of Kansas
- University of Missouri
- University of Nebraska
- University of Oklahoma
- Washington University in St. Louis

== Selected lecture recitals ==
- Central Missouri State University
- Eastman School of Music
- Emporia State University
- Union College
- University of Kansas
- University of Missouri, Kansas City
- University of Oklahoma

== Selected publications ==
- Maxey, Lawrence. The Copland Clarinet Concerto. The Clarinet, Summer, 1985, Volume XII, Number 4, pages 28–32.
- Maxey, Lawrence. Clarinet Section Intonation. The Instrumentalist, February 1979, Volume 33, Number 7, pages 86–88.
- Maxey, Lawrence. Two Great American Clarinetists: A Profile. National Association of College Wind and Percussion Instructors Journal, Fall, 1974, Volume 23, Number 1, pages 14–15.
- Maxey, Lawrence. The Rose Thirty-Two Etudes: A Study in Metamorphosis. The Clarinet, August 1974, Volume 1, Number 4, pages 8–9.
- Maxey, Lawrence. Miniaturization in Clarinet Tonguing. Kansas Music Review, September 1972, Volume 34, Number 3, pages 17–18.
- Maxey, Lawrence. Clarinet Tonguing: The All-Important First Steps. Kansas Music Review, October 1971, Volume 33, Number 4, pages 22–23.
