= Andrey Laukhin =

Russian musician

Andrey Laukhin is a Russian clarinetist.

Laukhin is the principal clarinetist of the St. Petersburg Philharmonic Orchestra. As a member of the orchestra, he has been on tour in the United States and Europe. He is a Laureate of the All-Russian Competition for clarinet.

His features as a soloist have received positive reviews. The New York Classical Review called his interpretation in Rachmaninoff's Second Symphony "sublime—its melody seems to go on forever, and Laukhin caressed it beautifully as he guided it towards its contemplative finish". The Classical Review stated that Laukhin "floated a plangent nostalgic clarinet solo", while the San Diego Story called it "a gentle, ardent solo that captured the composer's heart-on-his-sleeve convictions".
