= Francisco Forteza (son) =

Uruguayan political figure

Francisco Forteza (son) (1928–2005) was a Uruguayan political figure.

== Background ==
He was a prominent member of the Uruguayan Colorado Party. His father Francisco Forteza was a Deputy and Senator, and served as a minister in the 1940s and 1950s.

He was elected as a deputy in 1964.

== Ministerial career ==
From 1967 to 1970 he was a junior economy minister; unlike his father Francisco Forteza who refused to support the Presidency of Gabriel Terra, he was willing to serve as junior economy minister under a political figure such as César Charlone, who had been Vice President of Uruguay under Terra, whose Administration ruled by decree. In 1972 he served as economy minister under President Bordaberry. In 1984 he was again elected a Deputy and in 1987 he was elected a Senator. In 1989 he served as Interior Minister in the first Administration of President Sanguinetti.

== Later life ==
Having previously been elected a Deputy again in 1984 and served in the Senate from 1987 onwards, on relinquishing the Interior Ministry he subsequently reverted to serving in the Senate until 1990.

He died in 2005.

== See also ==
- Politics of Uruguay
- List of political families#Uruguay
