= Michael Whight =

Clatinettist

Michael Whight is a British clarinettist. He serves the Royal Philharmonic Orchestra as its principal on clarinet. He also instructs, teaching clarinet at Trinity College of Music and serving as both woodwind coach and orchestra conductor at the Capital Philharmonic Orchestra.

== Biography ==
Through the 1990s, Whight was the principal clarinettist for the Philharmonia Orchestra. Subsequently, he led clarinet for a number of orchestras, including the London Philharmonic, before taking a position as principal for the Royal Philharmonic Orchestra. He also serves at the Capital Philharmonic Orchestra, an instructing orchestra formed in 2007, as both a conductor and a woodwind coach and at Trinity College of Music as a professor of clarinet.

During his career, Whight has garnered an international reputation. He has performed in England and abroad as a soloist with a number of orchestras and performed by invitation at the 2003 World Orchestra for Peace in Saint Petersburg and Moscow along with notable musicians from major orchestras around the world.

Whight has won several notable awards, including the 1984 International Clarinet Congress Competition, which he was the first British performer to win, and the Royal Overseas League Competition for woodwind and brass. He has also judged competitions, routinely assisting at the Young Musician of the Year Award for the BBC.

Among his recordings are works for the BBC.
