= Pascal Moraguès =

French clarinetist

Pascal Moraguès is a French clarinetist. Moragues has been the principal clarinetist of the Orchestre de Paris since 1981. He has been a professor at the Conservatoire de Paris since 1995 and a guest professor at the Osaka College of Music since 2002.

== Discography ==
- Messiaen: Quatuor Pour La Fin Du Temps, Thème Et Variations, with the Wanderer Trio. Harmonia Mundi, 2008.
- Brahms: String Quartet Op 51, Clarinet Quintet Op. 115, with the Prazak String Quartet. Praga, 2006.
- MOZART, with Quintette Moragues. Euravent, 1992.
