= Wolfgang Kornberger =

Austrian bass clarinetist

Wolfgang Kornberger is an Austrian bass clarinetist.

Kornberger studied at the Academy of Music and the Performing Arts in Vienna. He was a founding member of the Vienna Clarinet Connection, and has worked for them as an arranger since 1994. He was also a member of Trio Clarin from 1994, performing in the Schwetzingen Festival and the Rheingau Musik Festival. He holds a part-time lectureship at the University of Music and Performing Arts in Vienna. He has performed with the Vienna Philharmonic, the Wiener Staatsoper, the RSO Vienna and the Wiener Volksoper.
