= Pascual Martínez-Forteza =

Spanish clarinetist

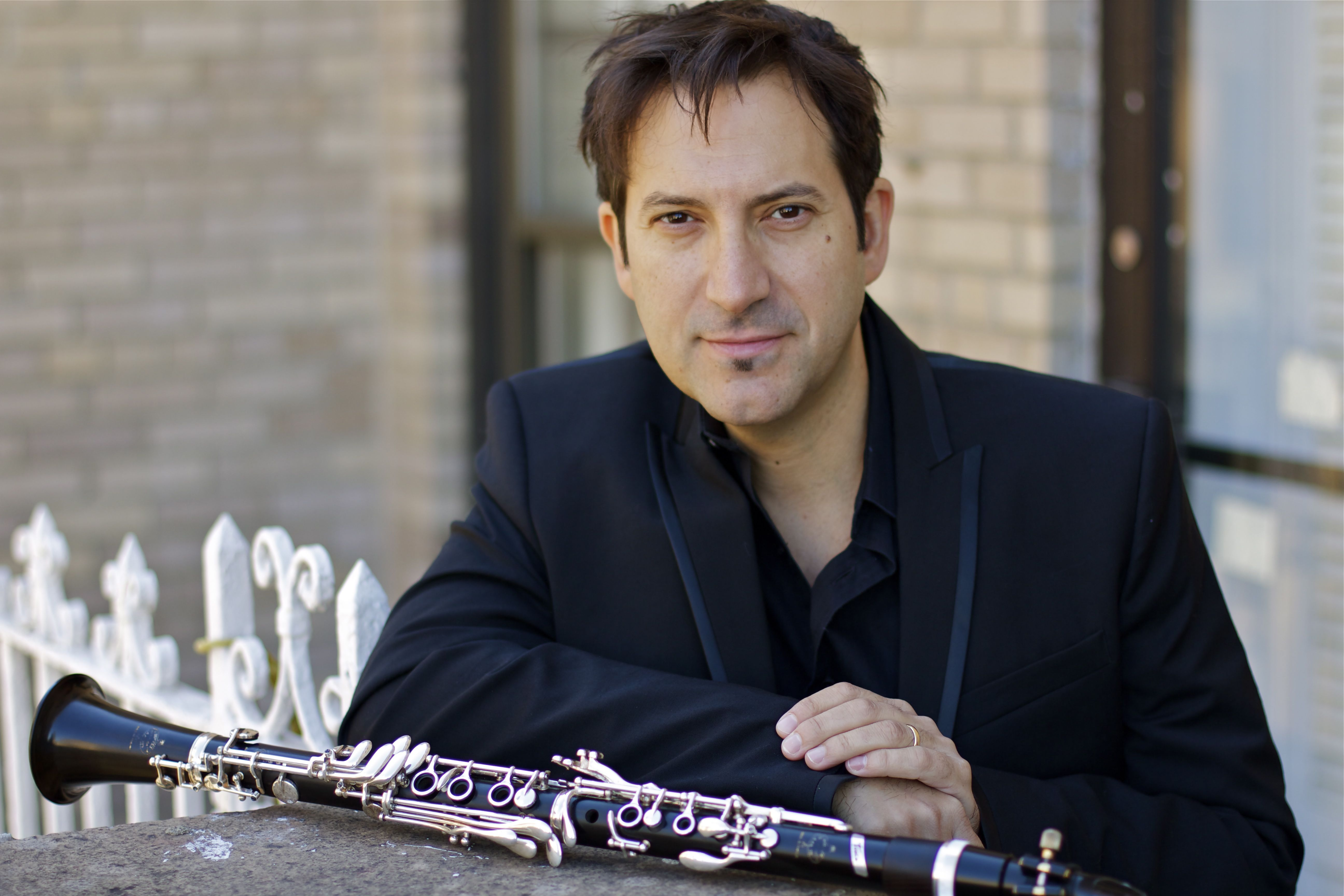
- Martínez-Forteza in 2015
- Born: 25 August 1972 (age 53); Palma de Mallorca, Spain
- Occupation: Musician (clarinetist)
- Website: pascualmartinezforteza.myportfolio.com

Pascual Martínez-Forteza (born 1972) is a Spanish clarinetist. Born in Palma de Mallorca, he became the first Spanish musician in the history of the New York Philharmonic orchestra in 2001. Prior to that he was a member of the Cincinnati Symphony. He studied at the University of Southern California with Yehuda Gilad and is an active soloist and chamber musician in addition to his orchestral work. He is a faculty member of Manhattan School of Music, New York University, Bard Conservatory of Music and Auxiliary teacher at Juilliard School. He regularly teaches master classes at many international music festivals, conservatories, universities and schools all over the world.

He has lived in NYC since 2001. in 2005, he married Gema Nieto-Forteza (a pianist from Madrid with whom he has a professional piano-clarinet duo since 2003) and they have three children: Patricia (2007), Alba (2010) and Hugo (2013).
