= Elad Navon =

Israeli clarinetist

Elad Navon (Hebrew: אלעד נבון; born 16 August 2000 in Jerusalem) is an Israeli clarinetist and winner of the 2025 ARD International Music Competition at Munich.

== Education ==
Navon was born in 2000 in Jerusalem. At the age of 9, he began playing the clarinet and received lessons from Ilya Schwartz at the Jerusalem Academy of Music and Dance. From 2018 he pursued a Bachelor’s degree at the Buchmann–Mehta School of Music in Tel Aviv in the class of Tibi Cziger, graduating with distinction. 2022 he continued his studies with Yehuda Gilad at the University of Southern California in Los Angeles, where he completed a Master’s degree. Since 2024 he has been studying for an Artist Diploma at the Colburn School in Los Angeles. In addition, Navon has participated in masterclasses with François Benda, Sharon Kam, and Martin Fröst.

Since 2017 his education has been supported by scholarships from the America–Israel Cultural Foundation.

== Career as orchestral musician and soloist ==
Alongside his studies, Navon has performed both as an orchestral musician and as a soloist. He has appeared with the Israel Philharmonic Orchestra, the Jerusalem Symphony Orchestra, the Haifa Symphony Orchestra, the San Diego Symphony, the American Youth Symphony, and the Colburn Orchestra, under conductors including Zubin Mehta, Lahav Shani, Esa-Pekka Salonen, and Vasily Petrenko. He is also active as a chamber musician.

== Awards ==
- 2022: First Prize, Kfar-Saba Winds Competition
- 2024: Second Prize, Vandoren Emerging Artist Competition
- 2024: First Prize, Aviv Competitions
- 2025 (10 September): First Prize in clarinet and Audience Prize at the ARD International Music Competition
