= Manfred Preis =

German bass clarinetist (born 1954)

- Born: 1954 (age 71–72); Hengersberg, Germany
- Genres: Classical
- Instruments: Clarinet, bass clarinet

Manfred Preis (born 1954, in Hengersberg) is a German bass clarinetist and saxophonist.

Preis studied at the Munich Musikhochschule and the Orchestra Academy of the Berliner Philharmoniker. He played clarinet in the Berlin Radio Symphony Orchestra. He plays bass clarinet in the Berlin Philharmonic. He also plays clarinet in Trio Berlin and the Winds of the Berlin Philharmonic. He teaches at the Hochschule für Musik of Nuremberg-Augsburg. He also plays in the ensemble Bolero Berlin, which plays Latin American music.
