= Michel Arrignon =

French clarinetist (1948–2025)

Michel Arrignon (French: [miʃɛl aʁiɲɔ̃]; 1948 – 12 March 2025) was a French clarinetist and professor of clarinet at the Conservatoire National Supérieur de Musique de Paris and at the Reina Sofía School of Music in Madrid.

== Life and career ==
Arrignon studied at the Conservatoire National Supérieur de Musique de Paris. He played in the Orchestre Mondial des Jeunesses Musicales and won second prize in the Geneva Concours International d'Exécution Musicale. He co-founded the Ensemble Intercontemporain with Pierre Boulez. He later joined the Orchestre de l'Opéra national de Paris. He also founded the O. Messian Quartet. He taught at the Conservatoire National Supérieur de Musique de Paris since 1989. He also served as a juror in several national and international music competitions, including the Carl Nielsen International Music Competition.

Arrignon worked as a clarinet tester and developer at Buffet Crampon from 1985. He helped create the Tosca clarinet, released in 2003 by Buffet Crampon, as well as Buffet's Festival clarinet designed in 1987. He played on Buffet Crampon Tosca Green-Line clarinets.

Arrignon died on 12 March 2025, at the age of 76.

== Discography ==
- Stockhausen – Donnerstag aus Licht. Deutsche Grammophon 2740 272 (4 LPs); 423 379-2 (4CDs). Hamburg: Polydor International GmbH, 1983.
- Weber Concertos, with Jean-Claude Montac. Karusel Music International, 1990.
