= Rupert Fankhauser =

Austrian clarinetist

- Origin: Vienna, Austria
- Genres: Classical, chamber
- Instrument: Clarinet

Rupert Fankhauser is an Austrian clarinetist. He is also a lecturer at the University of Music and Performing Arts Vienna.

== Education ==
Fankhauser studied clarinet at the University of Music and Performing Arts Vienna.

== Career ==
In 1985, Fankhauser became the principal clarinetist of the Municipal Theatre of Klagenfurt and the Carinthian Symphony Orchestra. He was also the principal clarinetist of the Gustav Mahler Youth Orchestra. He was principal clarinetist for the Cape Town Symphony Orchestra for the 1993–94 season. He has toured with the Vienna Philharmonic and the Berlin Philharmonic, and has soloed with the Vienna Chamber Orchestra and the Orchestra i Pomeriggi Musicali. He has been a member of the Vienna Clarinet Connection since 1999.
