= Anthony Gigliotti =

Anthony Gigliotti (May 13, 1922 – December 3, 2001) was an American clarinetist and music teacher. He was one of the world's most famous and most accomplished classical clarinet players for most of the second half of the 20th century.

Gigliotti grew up in South Philadelphia and lived in Cherry Hill, New Jersey. He joined the Philadelphia Orchestra as its principal clarinetist in 1949 and continued in this position for 47 years. He was the designer of a unique clarinet and saxophone ligature that is named for him. During his tenure with the orchestra, Gigliotti was a founding member of the Philadelphia Woodwind Quintet, and appeared on a television program called "200 Years of Woodwinds", performing with the quintet and interviewing guests such as Samuel Barber and Marcel Tabuteau.

Maintaining a heavy teaching and recording schedule upon his 1996 retirement, Gigliotti died on December 3, 2001, at a hospital in Camden, New Jersey. Since 1982, his son Mark has been a bassoonist in the Philadelphia Orchestra.
