= Hubert Salmhofer =

Austrian clarinetist and basset horn player

Hubert Salmhofer (born 24 July 1964) is an Austrian clarinetist and basset horn player.

Salmhofer graduated from the Graz Music Academy in 1990. He teaches at the academy and at its specialist music school in Oberschützen, as well as at the Conservatory of Music in Klagenfurt. He has played with the Gustav Mahler Youth Orchestra, the Austrian Radio Symphony Orchestra, the Vienna Volksoper and the Vienna Chamber Orchestra. He was a founding member of Trio Clarin, and has played in Quintessenz, Trio Gemärch, Austrian Art Ensembles, and Ensemble Zeitfluss. He is also a member of the Vienna Clarinet Connection.
