= Richard Haynes (musician) =

Australian clarinettist

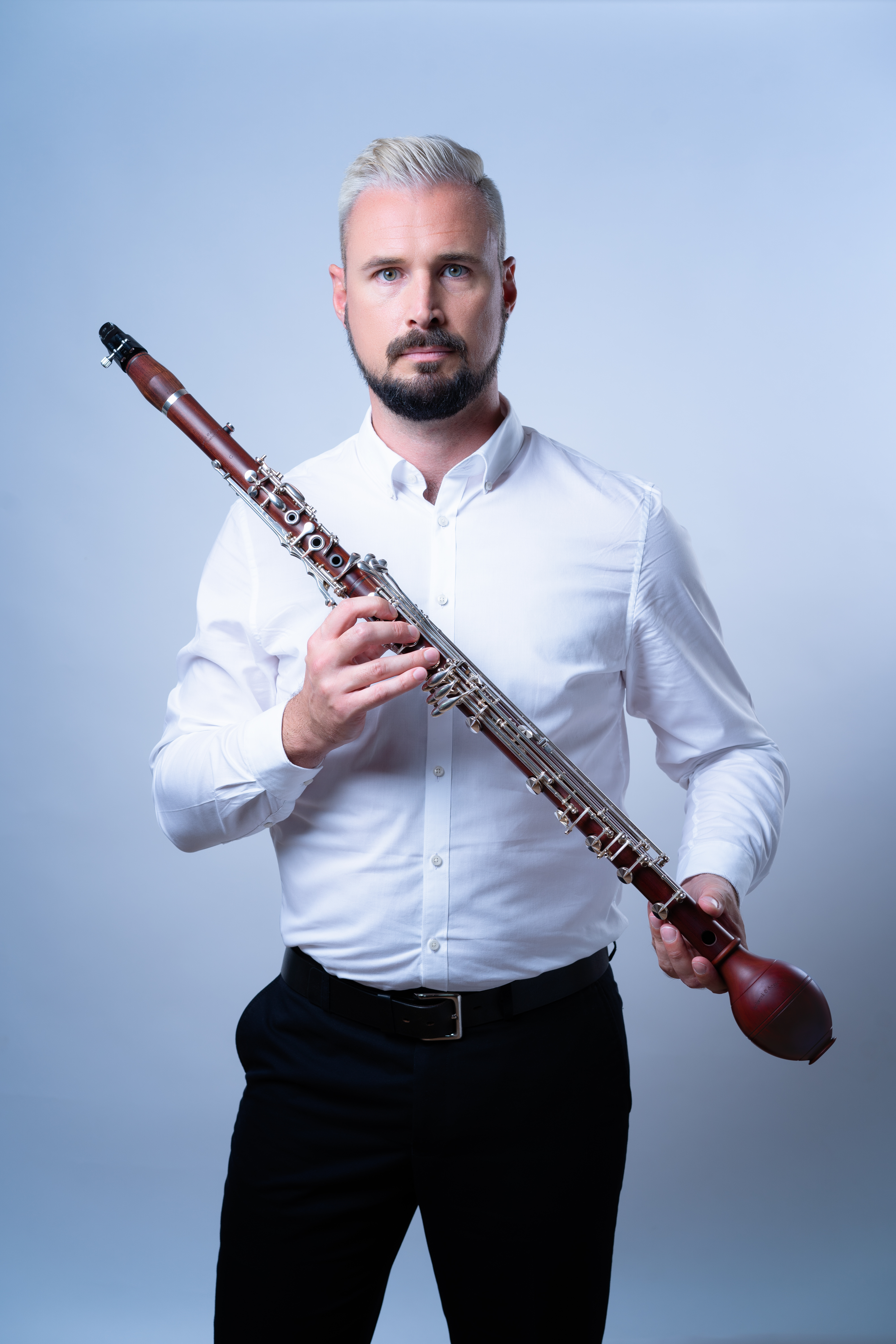
Haynes with a clarinet d'amore

Richard Elliot Haynes (born 18 April 1983) is an Australian clarinettist residing in Switzerland. He performs music spanning the 16th to 21st centuries worldwide, but predominantly music by living composers, in a multitude of contexts.

== Education ==
Haynes was born in Brisbane, Australia. He received piano lessons from 1989, and from 1992 viola and later clarinet lessons, graduating from high school in 2000. From 2000 to 2003 he studied clarinet and bass clarinet with Floyd Williams, Brian Catchlove and Diana Tolmie at Queensland Conservatorium Griffith University in Brisbane where he also obtained a Bachelor of Music in 2006. From 2006 to 2008 he continued his studies with Ernesto Molinari and Donna Wagner-Molinari at the University of the Arts Bern, where he studied classical and contemporary music, receiving a Soloist Diploma in clarinet with distinction. From 2008 to 2012, he held a clarinet research fellowship at the Royal Melbourne Institute of Technology. This involved research into contemporary sounds and works for clarinet and electronics, in collaboration with the Australian ELISION Ensemble.

=== Awards ===
During his studies Haynes received the following awards:

- 2000: Queensland Young Instrumentalist of the Year
- 2003: Australian Young Performer of the Year
- 2004: APRA AMC Art Music Award 2004: Best Performance of Australian Music
- 2005: City of Brisbane Cultural Scholarship 2004
- 2006: Cultural Scholarship of the Goethe-Institut Melbourne for Cultural Excellence
- 2008: Music Award of the Eduard Tschumi Foundation
- 2008: Australian Research Council Linkage Scholarship (APAI)
- 2009: First prize of the Fondation Nicati Concours (National: Switzerland).
- 2009: Australian Research Council (APAI)

== Activity as a clarinetist ==
Haynes appeared in his solo debut with the Queensland Symphony Orchestra at the age of 17 with the Clarinet Concerto by John Veale, going on to perform further concertos by Aaron Copland, W. A. Mozart, Peter Rankine, Michael Smetanin, Nigel Westlake and Iannis Xenakis. Since completing his studies in Brisbane, he has performed regularly in Europe, the United States, Asia, Australia and New Zealand. He has performed as soloist, chamber and orchestral musician at many of the major Australian, American and European classical and contemporary music festivals, including the international arts festivals of Adelaide, Brisbane, Melbourne, Perth and Sydney, Budapest, Paris and Warsaw, as well as the Lucerne Festival, the Holland Festival, MaerzMusik Berlin, Festival Archipel Geneva, Wien Modern, Salzburg Festivals and Lincoln Center Festival New York City.

As an orchestral musician, Haynes has been engaged by the SWR and WDR Symphony Orchestras, Basel Sinfonietta, Theaterorchester Hagen and the Queensland Symphony Orchestra. He has had the opportunity to perform as a soloist with the Christchurch, Queensland, Melbourne and Tasmanian Symphony Orchestras, the RTÉ National Symphony Orchestra (Dublin) and the Bern Symphony Orchestra.

Since 2005 he has been a member of the Australian international contemporary music ensemble, ELISION. 2007 saw the foundation of chamber music ensemble, Præsenz and in 2012 and 2013 he began working with Manufaktur für Aktuelle Musik and Ensemble Proton Bern respectively. The reed quintet BlattWerk was founded in 2016 with which Haynes has performed throughout Switzerland. Haynes was a temporary member of 175 East (Auckland) and Stroma (Wellington) from 2007 to 2011. He also has performed with CIKADA (Oslo), Collegium Novum Zürich, Ensemble Garage (Cologne), Ensemble Modern (Frankfurt am Main), Ensemble Musikfabrik (Cologne), Ensemble oh-ton (Oldenburg), Ensemble Phoenix (Basel), Ensemble Resonanz (Hamburg), Ensemble risonanze erranti (Munich) and Klangforum Wien (Vienna).

Haynes has enjoyed temporary or contract employment, providing solo recitals, lectures and coachings for providing clarinet and chamber music at the music universities of University of California, Berkeley, Canterbury University, Christchurch, Griffith University, Queensland Conservatorium, Harvard University, Cambridge, Huddersfield University, Huddersfield, University of Melbourne, Parkville, Stanford University, Stanford, Sydney Conservatorium, University of Sydney, California Institute of the Arts, New Zealand School of Music the State University of Music and Performing Arts Stuttgart. He was engaged as soloist for Brian Ferneyhough's La Chute d'Icare for the "Campus Conducting" programme at the Hochschule für Musik Dresden and performed this work with 28 different conductors. Haynes is a teacher of the master classes for contemporary music at the isa - International Summer Academy of the University of Music and Performing Arts Vienna.

== New Works for clarinet ==
New works for clarinet have been written for him and dedicated to him by Samuel Andreyev, Trevor Bača, Richard Barrett, Aaron Cassidy, Robert Dahm, Chris Dench, Walter Feldmann, Füsun Köksal, Liza Lim, Timothy McCormack, Michael Norris, Enno Poppe, Nemanja Radivojević, Rebecca Saunders, Dominique Schafer and Jeroen Speak. He has performed in major instrumental, operatic or theatrical works such as CONSTRUCTION and Opening of the Mouth by Richard Barrett, Written on Skin by George Benjamin, EvE & ADINN by Sivan Cohen Elias, BEGEHREN by Beat Furrer, Par-Ze-Fool by Bernhard Lang, Moon Spirit Feasting and The Navigator by Liza Lim, Delusion of the Fury by Harry Partch, Chroma and Stasis by Rebecca Saunders, El Publico by Mauricio Sotelo and KLANG: Die 24 Stunden des Tages by Karlheinz Stockhausen.

=== World premieres of solo works (selection) ===
- Samuel Andreyev – A Line Alone (for clarinet d'amore)
- Trevor Bača – MYRKR (for bass clarinet)
- Richard Barrett – the book of caverns (for clarinet in E♭)
- Jesse Broekman – to cause bones to be (for contrabass clarinet)
- Robert Dahm – I watched you as you disappeared (for bass clarinet)
- Chris Dench – ghosts of motion (for clarinet d'amore)
- Walter Feldmann – …süsses Unheil… (for clarinet d'amore)
- James Gardner (musician) – Carica d'amore (for clarinet d'amore)
- Jonah Haven – huso huso (for clarinet d'amore)
- Richard Haynes – bouteille, clarinette, violon, journal, verre (for 1 performer)
- Füsun Köksal – voce immobile (for bass clarinet)
- Alan Lawrence – Composition with Eames Chair (for clarinet in B♭)
- Liza Lim – Sonorous Body (for clarinet in B♭)
- Timothy McCormack – RAW MATTER (for bass clarinet)
- Dugal McKinnon – Nowdrifts (for bass clarinet and fixed media)
- Manuela Meier – iterate no trace (for bass clarinet)
- Rachael Morgan – Matahourua (for bass clarinet)
- Michael Norris – De corporis fabrica (for amplified clarinet in B♭)
- Timothy O'Dwyer – transbraxton II (for bass clarinet)
- Enno Poppe – Holz solo (for bass clarinet)
- Sean Quinn – incubation (for clarinet d'amore)
- Nemanja Radivojevic – …prepozanćeš me po sjaju… (for bass clarinet)
- Matthias Renau – Schattenlinie (for clarinet d'amore)
- David Young – Breath Control (for amplified clarinet in B♭)

=== World premieres of ensemble works (selection) ===
- Samuel Andreyev – Sonata da camera (for ensemble)
- Richard Barrett – Hypnerotomachia (for two clarinets in A)
- Pierre Boulez arr. Johannes Schöllhorn – 12 Notations (for ensemble)
- Aaron Cassidy – And the scream, Bacon's scream, is the operation through which the entire body escapes through the mouth (for ensemble)
- David Chisholm – The Beginning and the End of the Snow (for mezzo soprano, clarinet/bass clarinet, viola, violoncello, piano/harpsichord/celeste, harp)
- Ann Cleare – to another of that other (for trio)
- Chris Dench – sum over histories (for bass & contrabass clarinets)
- James Dillon – theatrum : figuræ (for ensemble)
- Turgut Erçetin – Resonances (for ensemble)
- Brian Ferneyhough – Finis Terrae (for voices & ensemble)
- Bernhard Gander – Bunny Games (for ensemble)
- Georg Friedrich Haas – Ich suchte, aber ich fand ihn nicht (for ensemble)
- Sam Hayden – misguided (for quartet)
- Christian Henking – Change (for ensemble)
- Justin Hoke – thane (for bass & contrabass clarinets)
- Evan Johnson – Apostrophe I (all communication is a form of complaint) (for two bass clarinets)
- Mauricio Kagel – In der Matratzengruft (for voice & ensemble)
- Dominik Karski – The Source Within (for ensemble)
- Tobias Krebs – REFRACTIONS (for ensemble)
- Catherine Lamb – Curva triangulus (for ensemble)
- Bernhard Lang – Das Hirn (for soprano and ensemble)
- Bernhard Lang – Par-ze-fool (opera)
- David Lang – hammerspace (for ensemble)
- Liza Lim – The Navigator (opera)
- Timothy McCormack – KILN I (for trio)
- Hector Parra – Un souffle en suspens (for ensemble)
- Enno Poppe – Filz (for viola & ensemble)
- Edward Rushton – What you can see (for clarinet & string quartet)
- Rebecca Saunders – Aether (for two bass clarinets)
- Dominique Schafer – Vers une présence réelle… (for ensemble)
- Mauricio Sotelo – El Público (opera)
- Gérard Zinsstag – Vier Affekte (for ensemble)
- W. A. Mozart - The clarinet concerto with a basset horn in G (instead of a basset clarinet in A)

== Instruments ==
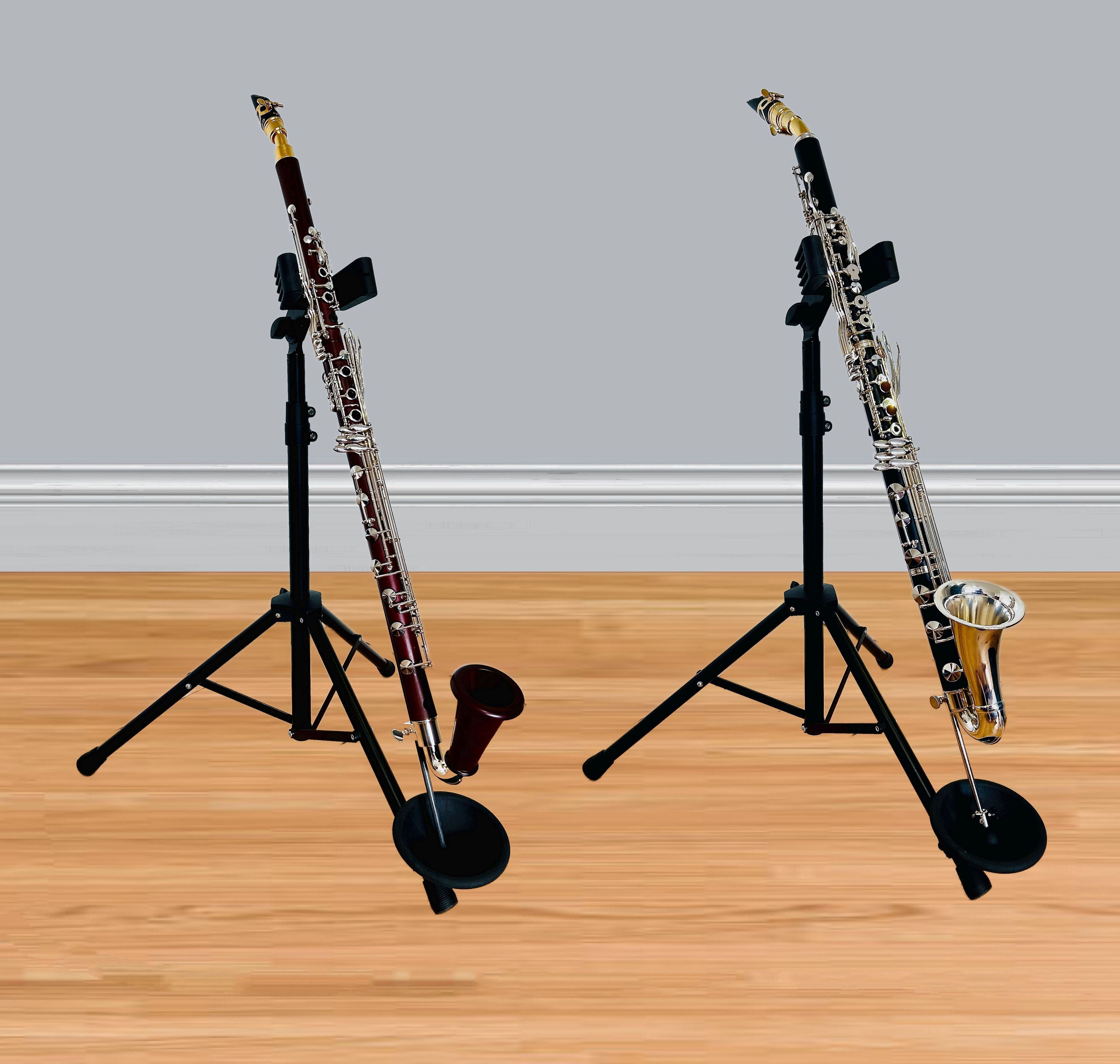
Basset horns in G (Seggelke clarinets) and in F (Leblanc))

Richard Haynes owns and plays the following clarinets: A♭ clarinet (Leblanc), E♭ clarinet (Selmer), B♭/A clarinets (Schwenk & Seggelke),
clarinet d'amore in G (Seggelke clarinets) and basset horn in F (Leblanc), bass clarinet in B♭ (Selmer), contralto clarinet in E♭ (Leblanc) and contrabass clarinet in B♭ (Leblanc).

Haynes also uses the body of his clarinet d'amore with a typical basset horn foot with a wooden ell (instead of the Liebesfuß) and a slightly curved metal barrel (instead of the wooden barrel) with a matching mouthpiece as a basset horn in G (with a narrow bore). On this redesigned instrument, he plays the Clarinet Concerto by Mozart in G major instead of A major with the Camerata Ataremac, as Mozart had originally intended as a concerto for basset horn in G and orchestra, but of which only the first 179 bars exist (K 621 b).

== Discography ==
There are approximately 40 CD recordings by Haynes, details of which are listed on his website.
