= Clarinet d'amore =

Musical instrument in clarinet family

Clarinet d’amore
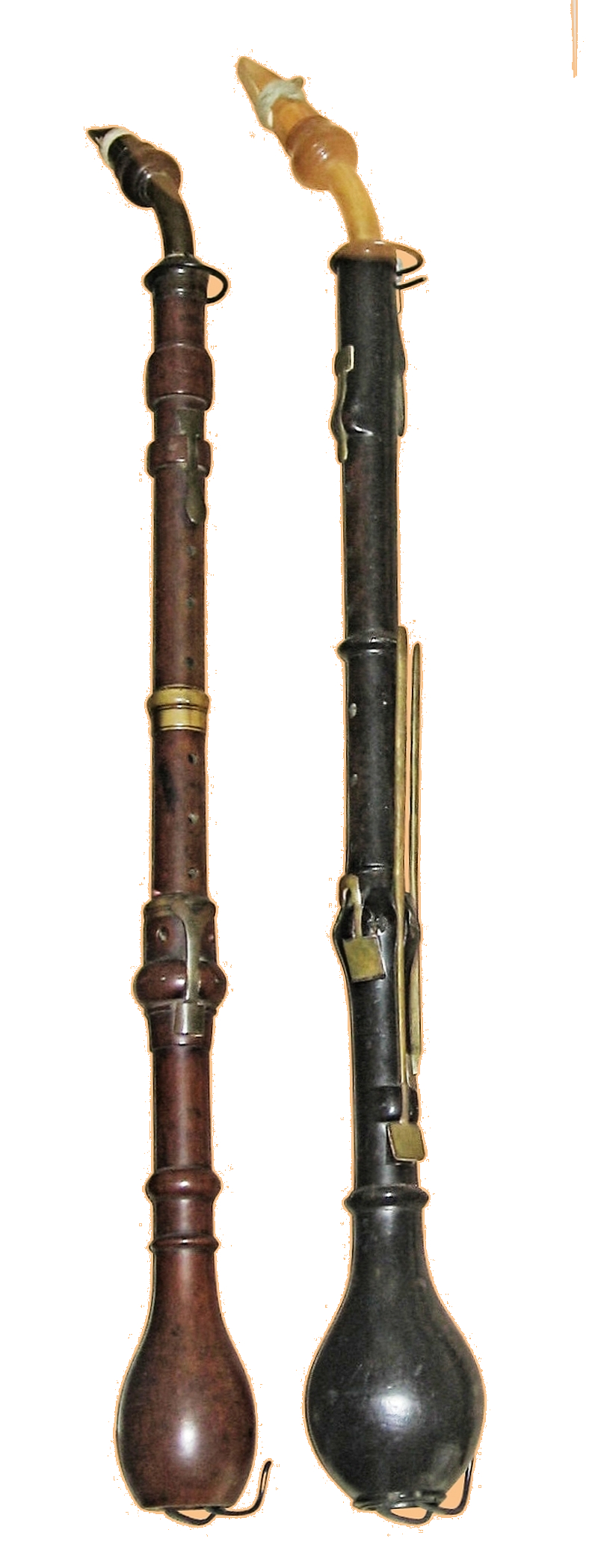
- Two historical clarinets d'amore

Woodwind instrument
- Classification: Wind; Woodwind; Single reed
- Developed: First developed c. 1740 in Berchtesgaden, Germany; Continued development throughout the 18th and 19th centuries in much of Western Europe; Further development from the early 21st century onwards

Playing range
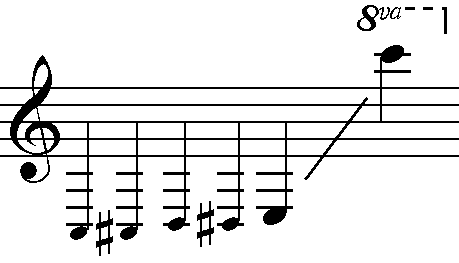
- 1. 2. ; 1. Historical, written 2. Modern, written; Written: (historical instrument) E_{3} to G_{6} (modern instrument) C_{3} to at least C_{7}; Sounding: (historical instrument) B_{2} to D_{6} (modern instrument) G_{2} to at least G_{6}

Related instruments
- Piccolo clarinet; Clarinet; Basset clarinet; Basset horn; Alto clarinet; Bass clarinet; Contralto clarinet; Contrabass clarinet

The clarinet d'amore or clarinet d'amour is a musical instrument, a member of the clarinet family.

== Construction and tone ==
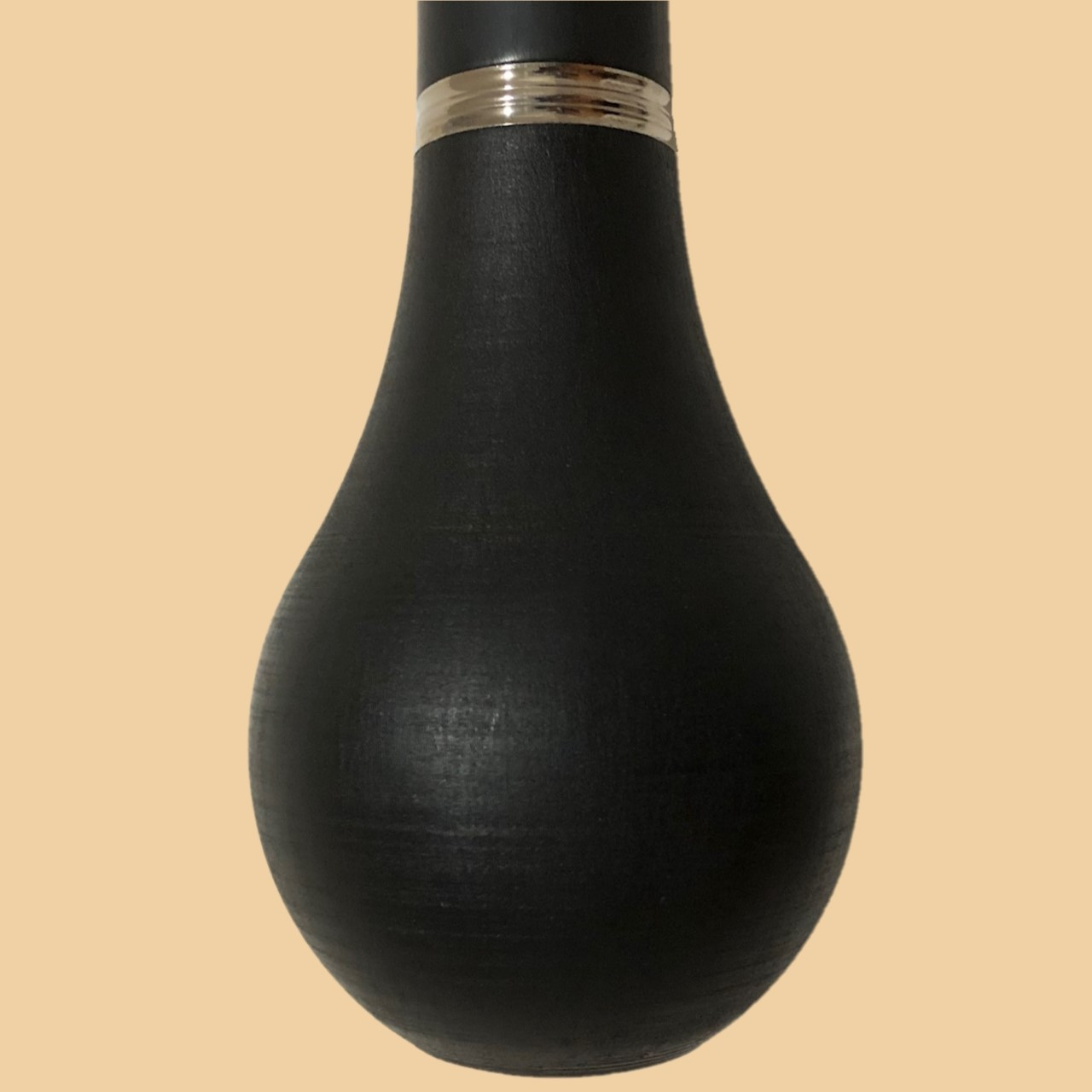
An example of a pear-shaped bell from a modern clarinet d'amore

In comparison with the B♭ and A soprano clarinets, the clarinet d'amore has a similar shape and construction, but is generally larger, usually pitched in G. (Note: Examples in F are also known. Some examples are said to be in the modern pitch of A♭, however there is no evidence to support this. The most likely explanation is that these instruments are in the key of G, but tuned to a higher pitch standard.) The clarinet d'amore has proportionally smaller tone holes and a proportionally smaller bore compared to the soprano clarinet, generally around the same size as the bore and tone holes found on the soprano clarinet itself. The instrument also has a pear-shaped or globular bell (called Liebesfuss) similar to that of the cor anglais; these features give the instrument its distinctive timbre. Due to their large size, they also feature a curved metal neck to bring the instrument to a more comfortable playing position, though instruments with curved wooden necks exist. Fingerings are generally the same as other members of the clarinet family, however modern examples often have an extension, like the basset horn, allowing them to play an additional 4 semitones.

In addition to the larger sizes, clarinet d'amore have also been constructed in C, B♭ and A, however these do not appear to fill the same musical role as the larger instruments. It has been suggested that these smaller instruments may have been made for aesthetic reasons rather than to serve a musical role.

== History ==
The clarinet d'amore first appeared in southern Germany around 1740, predating the more widely known basset horn by several decades. It has been conjectured that the basset horn, which at the time shared the features of low pitch and a small bore, was developed from the clarinet d'amore. Early instruments featured only 3 or 4 keys, though later instruments from the 19th century, such as an example by Wilhelm Heckel GmbH, have as many as 14 keys. At least 69 extant clarinet d'amour from the 18th and 19th century have survived to the modern era, suggesting the instrument did experience some popularity. By the mid 19th century the instrument was considered obsolete, however Heckel would continue to offer them until the early 20th century.

== Modern developments ==
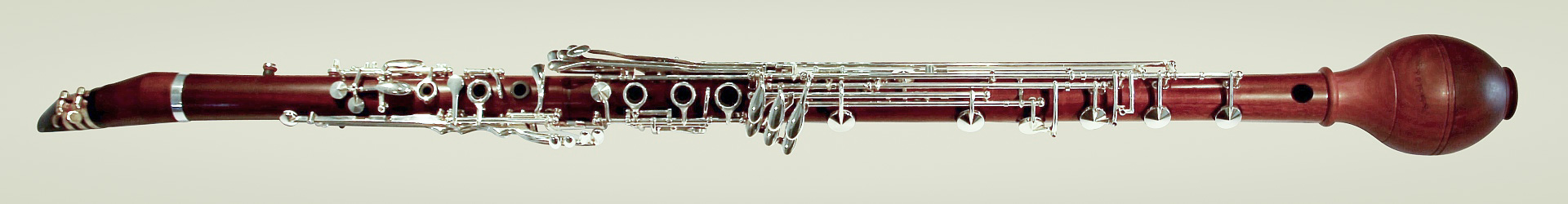
A modern clarinet d'amore built by Schwenk & Seggelke, Bamberg; commissioned by Richard Haynes

Recently efforts have been made to resurrect the clarinet d'amore in both period correct and modern forms. Modern developments include a recording project led by Vlad Weverbergh of music by Henri-Joseph de Croes for historical clarinets d'amore (available from Etcetera Records) and the development of an extended modern clarinet d'amore in G (with a written range to low C3, sounding G2) by Richard Haynes, and Schwenk & Seggelke.

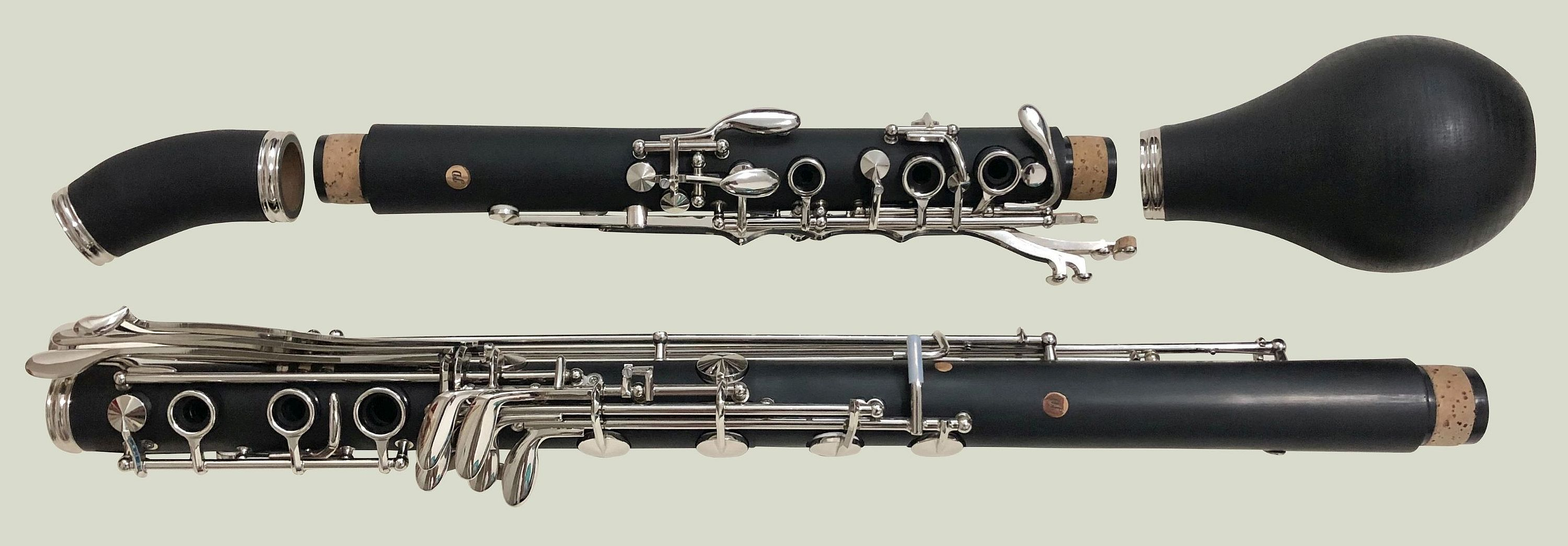
Components of a modern clarinet d'amore, including the curved neck, bulbous bell, upper joint and lower joint with an extension to low C

== Works for the instrument ==
Works for or including clarinet/clarinette/clarinetto d'amore/d'amour/dolce or "in G" include:

- Johann Christian Bach – Temistocles: Act Three – "Ah si resta" (1772) incl. 3 clarinets d'amore in D (although thought most likely to be basset horns in D)
- Anonymous – Concertante in G Major for two clarinets d'amore and ensemble
- Wolfgang Amadeus Mozart - Mi lagnerò tacendo, K. 437 (1783)
- Wolfgang Amadeus Mozart - Concerto for Basset Horn and Orchestra in G Major, K. 584b/621b (unfinished fragment of first movement, nearly identical with the first movement of the Clarinet Concerto in A)
- Henri Joseph de Croes — Partita (1788) for two clarinets in G, two violas and violone (recorded on clarinets d'amore by Terra Nova Collective)
- Johann Simon Mayr — Qui sedes, for soprano, tenor & clarinetto dolce or corno bassetto
- Johann Simon Mayr — Gloria patri, for soprano, horn & clarinetto dolce
- Henrik Strindberg — Music for Clarinet d'Amore and Strings (2018)
- James Gardner — Carica d'amore (2020)
- Richard Haynes — Shorelines (2020)
- Samuel Andreyev — A Line Alone (2020)
- Chris Dench — ghosts of motion (2020)
- Walter Feldmann — ...süsses Unheil... (2020)
- Matthias Renaud — Schattenlinie (2020)
- Jonah Haven — huso huso (2020)
- Sean Quinn — incubation (2020)
- Martin Gaughan — Sonatina (Hushed in the Twilight) (2020/21)

== See also ==
- Flute d'amore
- Oboe d'amore
- Viola d'amore
