= Clarinet Concerto (Mozart) =

Musical composition by Mozart

- by Wolfgang Amadeus Mozart
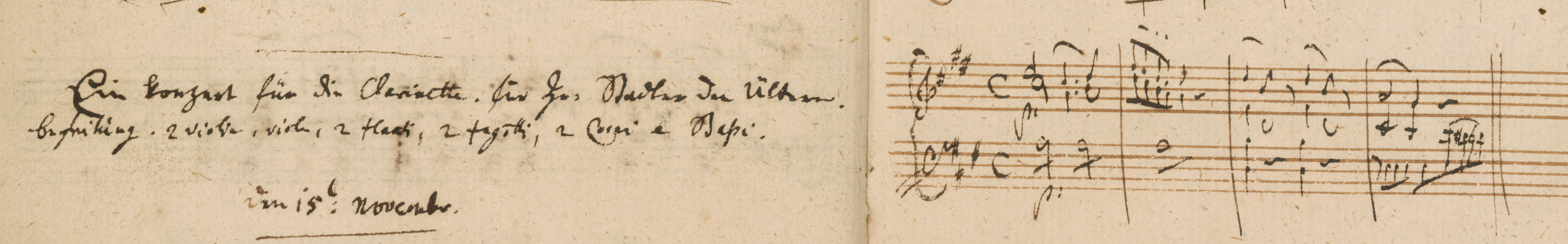
- Entry in Mozart's Verzeichnüss of his clarinet concerto
- Key: A major
- Catalogue: K. 622
- Style: Classical period
- Composed: 1791
- Movements: 3

Wolfgang Amadeus Mozart's Clarinet Concerto in A major, K. 622, was completed in October 1791 for the clarinettist Anton Stadler. It consists of three movements, in a fast–slow–fast succession.

1. Allegro (in A major and in sonata form)
2. Adagio (in D major and in ternary form)
3. Rondo: Allegro (in A major)

The work was completed a few weeks before the composer's death. It was to be his second to last completed work, Laut verkünde unsre Freude (K. 623) being his last, and has been described as his swan song. The date of its first performance is not certain, but may have been 16 October 1791 in Prague.

The concerto was written to be played on the basset clarinet, which can play lower notes than an ordinary clarinet, but after the death of Mozart it was published with changes to the solo part to allow performance on conventional instruments. The manuscript score is lost, but from the latter part of the 20th century onwards many performances of the work have been given on basset clarinets in conjectural reconstructions of Mozart's original.

== History ==
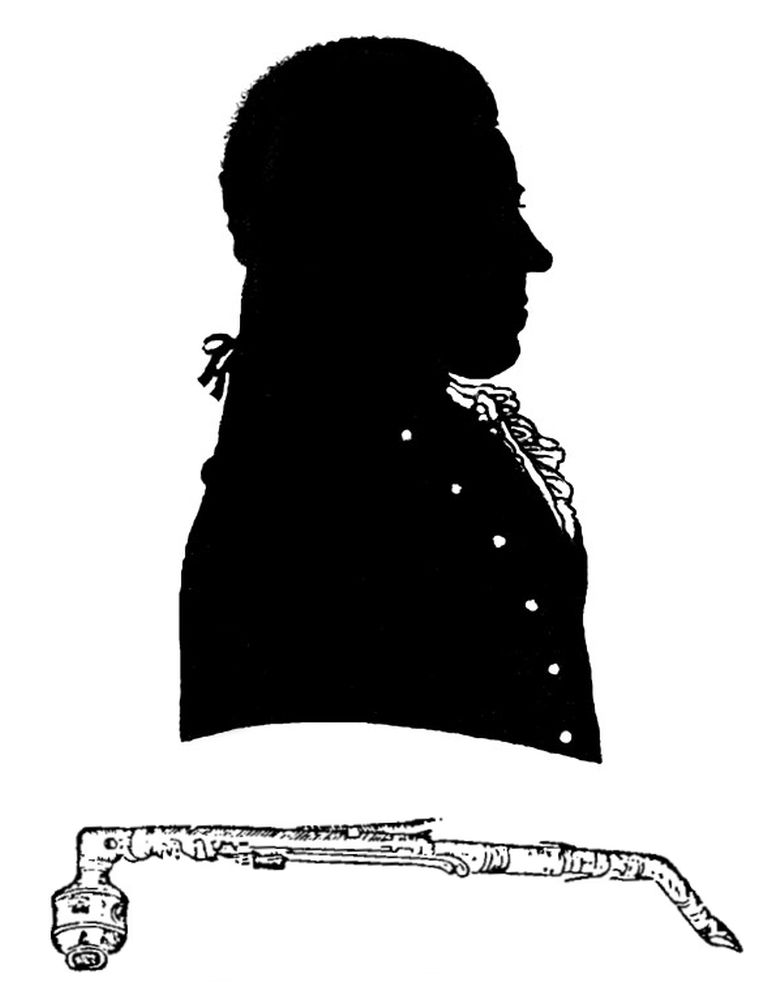
Silhouette of Anton Stadler; sketch of his basset clarinet, 1794

Anton Stadler, a close friend of Mozart, was a virtuoso clarinettist and co-inventor of the basset clarinet, an instrument with an extended range of lower notes. It went down to low (written) C, instead of stopping at (written) E as standard clarinets do. Stadler was also an expert player of the basset horn. Mozart first composed music for that instrument as early as 1783, and for the basset clarinet in 1787. The latter features in the instrumentation of Così fan tutte (1789). In early October 1791 Mozart wrote to his wife from Prague that he had completed "Stadler's rondo" – the third movement of the Clarinet Concerto. The concerto was the final major work Mozart completed; Wolfgang Hildesheimer has described it as the composer's "last instrumental work, and his last great completed work of any kind", and the critic Henri Ghéon called it Mozart's "swan-song".

There is no surviving autograph for the concerto, and the printed score was published posthumously. The only relic of the work written in Mozart's hand is an excerpt of an earlier rendition written for basset horn in G (K. 584b/621b). This excerpt, dating from late 1789, is nearly identical to the corresponding section in the published version for A clarinet, although only the melody lines are completely filled out. After rethinking the work as a basset clarinet concerto, Mozart gave the completed manuscript to Stadler in October 1791. The date of the first performance is not known for certain, but was probably on 16 October 1791 in Prague. Stadler gave a concert there on that day, but no programme survives.

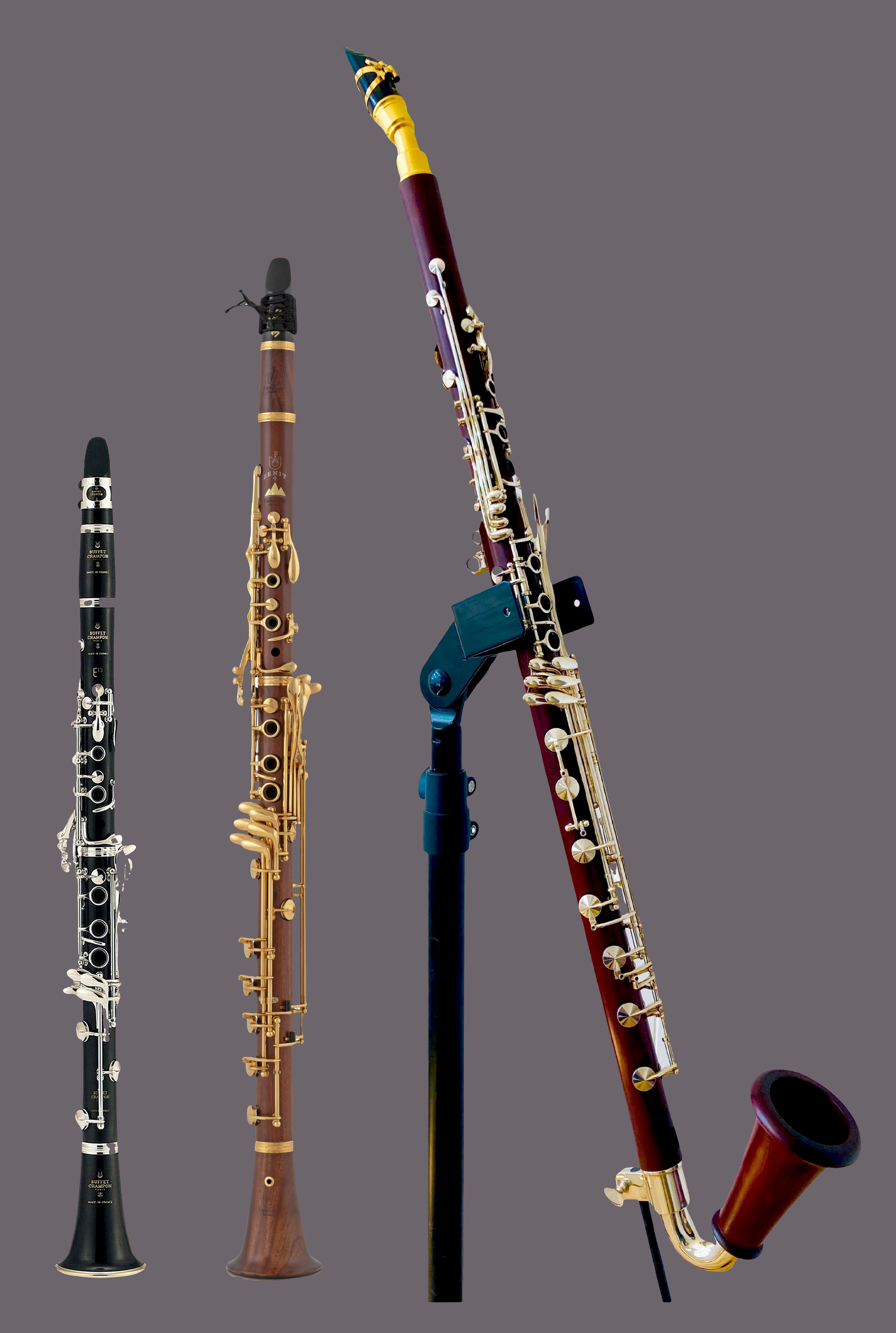
Standard clarinet (soprano) in A, basset clarinet in A and Basset horn in G

Several notes throughout the piece go beyond the conventional range of the A clarinet, but the basset clarinet was a rare, custom-made instrument, and when the piece was published after Mozart's death, a new version was made by unknown arrangers, with the low notes transposed to regular range. Objections were raised to this: a reviewer in the Allgemeine musikalische Zeitung commented that although the transpositions made the work playable on standard clarinets, it would have been better to publish Mozart's original version, with the alterations printed in smaller notes as optional alternatives.

The clarinettist Alan Hacker commented in 1969 that if the original manuscript had been published, "manufacturers would have made and sold basset clarinets by the thousand", but the manuscript was lost. Mozart's widow told a publisher that Stadler had either lost it, pawned it or had it stolen from him. In 1801 three different publishing houses – André, Sieber, and Breitkopf & Härtel – published editions of the work, all with the solo part adapted for the standard clarinet. These became the standard performing editions.

The basset clarinet fell out of use after Stadler's death and no original instruments from his time have survived. (Note: A basset clarinet dating from about 1840 is in a German collection and a later 19th-century example is in a collection at Oxford, but they differ from Stadler's instrument in their constructions.) The instrument was revived in the latter part of the 20th century, when instrument builders attempted to replicate the original instrument, Indeed, basset clarinets have been built for the specific purpose of performing Mozart's concerto and clarinet quintet. Some of these have been based on 1790s engravings showing Stadler's instrument. On 28 June 1951, in Prague, the Czech clariettist Josef Janouš played the first modern performance of a version of the concerto reconstructed by the Czech composer Jiří Kratochvil (1924–2014), using a Selmer A clarinet with a basset lower joint, in which the four basset keys were operated with the right thumb as on the historical instruments. In 1968, the Swiss clarinettist Hans Rudolf Stalder used an instrument built by F. Arthur Uebel to perform a version of the concerto reconstructed in collaboration with Ernst Hess in Augsburg, Germany. He made the first recording of the concerto using a basset clarinet, with the Cologne Chamber Orchestra, in September 1968, Since 1984, Sabine Meyer has used a basset clarinet in A made by Herbert Wurlitzer to play the concerto (and also Mozart's clarinet quintet).

The first reconstruction of the concerto for basset clarinet was made in 1951 by Kratochvil. This was followed by reconstructions by others, including Hess (1968), Hans Deinzer (1970) and Alan Hacker (1974). The most frequently performed are the two versions published by Bärenreiter (Kratochvil/Hess) and Schott (Wehle/Meyer) In 2023, the clarinettist Richard Haynes undertook to rewrite the score in G major using the fragment K. 621b. Since April 2024, Haynes has been performing the concerto in this version on a basset horn in G made for him by Jochen Seggelke.

Of all the clarinet concertos, the Mozart concerto is by far the most frequently performed.

== Music ==
The modern scoring of the work is for solo clarinet in A, two flutes, two bassoons, two horns and strings. The typical performance time is 29 minutes (see "Audio files" below).

=== I. Allegro ===
The concerto opens with a sonata-form movement in A major. The form of the movement is as follows:

- Orchestral ritornello: bars 1–56
- Solo exposition: bars 57–154
- Ritornello: bars 154–171
- Development: bars 172–227
- Ritornello: bars 227–250
- Recapitulation: bars 251–343
- Ritornello: bars 343–359

The first theme begins an orchestral ritornello that is joyful and light:

It soon transforms into a flurry of sixteenth notes in descending sequence, played by the violins and flutes while the lower instruments drive the piece forward. After the medial caesura, the strings begin a series of canons before the first closing theme, featuring first and second violins, enters. The second closing theme is much more subtle until the fanfare of its final two bars. As the soloist enters in bar 57, the clarinet repeats the opening theme with the expected added ornamentation. As the orchestra restates the main theme, the clarinet traverses the whole range of the instrument with several flourishes.

The secondary theme begins in the parallel minor, and eventually tonicizes C major before arriving in the dominant key, E major. At the end of the E-major section, there is a short pause, where the soloist conventionally improvises a short eingang (cadenza), although no context is offered for a true cadenza. The canonic material of the opening ritornello returns, this time involving the clarinet and leads to the novel feature of the soloist accompanying the orchestra with an Alberti bass over the first closing theme. The orchestral ritornello returns, ending with the second closing theme.

The development section explores a few new key areas including F♯ minor and D major, and even has some hints of the Baroque. Before the formal orchestral ritornello leading into the recapitulation, Mozart writes a series of descending sequences with the cellos and bassoons holding suspensions over staccato strings.

As is conventional in Classical concerto form, in the recapitulation the soloist and orchestra are united, and the secondary theme is altered to stay in the tonic. As the secondary theme comes to a close, the clarinet has another chance to improvise briefly, and this time leads the canonic material that follows. The Alberti bass and arpeggios over diminished chords for the soloist recur before the movement ends in a cheerful final orchestral ritornello.

At around 12 minutes, the Allegro is the longest movement in the concerto.

=== II. Adagio ===
The second movement, which is in rounded binary form (i.e. ABA'), is in the subdominant D major. The two-part, cantabile 16-bar main theme is first performed by the solo clarinet and repeated by the orchestra:

The B section, in which the solo part is always prominent, exploits the chalumeau (lowest) register, including (in the reconstructed version) the basset tones down to (written) C_{3} (sounding A_{2}), the lowest tone which the basset clarinet in A can play, and also uses the clarion register (the middle register). This section is followed in bar 59 by the aforementioned cadenza, which in turn is followed by the first theme, played piano (sometimes pianissimo) by the clarinet, which concludes the movement with a coda.

=== III. Rondo: Allegro ===
The concerto ends with a movement in A major. This movement is a blend of sonata and rondo forms that Mozart developed in his piano concertos, most notably the A major Piano Concerto, K. 488. It is in A–B–A–C–A–B–A form, with the middle A's being shorter restatements of the theme, unlike regular rondo form which is ABACA.

The movement opens with a cheerful theme:

This refrain is interspersed with episodes either echoing this mood or recalling the darker colours of the first movement:

- The first A (bars 1–56) features the soloist in dialogue with the orchestra, often one phrase eliding seamlessly into the next. In some ways the orchestra and soloist are competing with one another – the more definitive the statement made by the orchestra, the more virtuosic the response by the clarinet.
- The first B (bars 57–113) begins with a lyrical theme, and eventually features chromaticism and some very dramatic lines which feature the extended range of the basset clarinet.
- The second A (114–137) is heard again briefly, before the orchestra moves right into the closing theme of the original A section, this time employing a descending sequence and hemiola, modulating to the relative minor.
- The C section (bars 137–177), according to the musicologist Colin Lawson, contains "one of the most dramatic showcases for the basset clarinet in the entire concerto, featuring spectacular leaps, together with dialogue between soprano and baritone registers". Starting in F♯ minor, this section eventually modulates back to A major.
- Bars 178–187 serve as the third A. By no means a full statement of the refrain, in this section Mozart sets the motif from the A section as a sequence of descending thirds leading to a stop on the dominant chord.
- The second B (bars 188–246) begins like the first but is extended and explores some different key areas. This allows the soloist frequent opportunities to display chromatic figurations, and the composer to demonstrate his creativity in the reworking of the material.
- The refrain (bars 247–301) is heard for the final time, finally in its entirety, before proceeding to the coda (bars 301–353). Here the rondo theme is developed dramatically, using the full range of the clarinet. The coda builds until a brief pause allows the solo clarinet to lead the orchestra into one more extended statement of the A theme, followed by the orchestra's now familiar closing theme of A.

Audio files of Mozart's Clarinet Concerto
Performed by William McColl (basset clarinet) and the University of Washington Symphony conducted by Abraham Kaplan (1987) I. Allegro II. Adagio III. Rondo: Allegro	Performed by Markus Krumpöck and the Merkur Orchester Wiener Neustadt conducted by Willibald Zwittkovits (1999) I. Allegro II. Adagio III. Rondo: Allegro	Performed by Bruce Edwards and the Fulda Symphonic Orchestra conducted by Simon Schindler (2004) I. Allegro II. Adagio III. Rondo: Allegro

== Recordings ==
The first recording of the concerto, made in 1929 (Brunswick Records 20076‑8), featured Haydn Draper as soloist, conducted by Clarence Raybould. It was followed by recordings with Luigi Amodio and François Étienne as soloists. None of these three versions were thought to have survived but copies of Draper's version have been found in Australian pressings. The first recordings of the reconstructed counterpart were made in September 1968 with the Swiss clarinettist Hans-Rudolph Stalder and the Cologne Chamber Orchestra, conducted by Helmut Müller-Brühl. For this and for concert performances, Stalder had a modern Boehm basset clarinet built at the F. Arthur Uebel factory in Markneukirchen, Saxony.

The first recording using a reconstruction of a period basset clarinet was in 1973 on the EMI label with Hans Deinzer and the conductorless Collegium Aureum. Parts of the concerto are heard in the score of The King's Speech (2010; orchestral sections only), and the Adagio is heard in Out of Africa (1985), with the soloist Jack Brymer.

Other recordings of the concerto include:

Year	Soloist	Conductor	Orchestra	Label
1940	Reginald Kell	Malcolm Sargent	London Philharmonic	His Master's Voice
1949	Leopold Wlach	Herbert von Karajan	Vienna Philharmonic	Columbia
1952	Louis Cahuzac	Mogens Wöldike	Danish Radio Chamber	Haydn Society
1957	Benny Goodman	Charles Munch	Boston Symphony Orchestra	RCA
1958	Bernard Walton	Herbert von Karajan	Philharmonia Orchestra	Warner Classics
1960	Jack Brymer	Sir Thomas Beecham	Royal Philharmonic	His Master's Voice
1960	Gervase de Peyer	Peter Maag	London Symphony	Decca
1961	Anthony Gigliotti	Eugene Ormandy	Philadelphia Orchestra	Columbia
1972	Karl Leister	Herbert von Karajan	Berlin Philharmonic	Deutsche Grammophon
1974	Alfred Prinz	Karl Böhm	Vienna Philharmonic	Deutsche Grammophon
1985	Thea King	Jeffrey Tate	English Chamber	Hyperion
1989	Richard Stoltzman	Alexander Schneider	English Chamber	RCA Victor Gold Seal
1989	Karl Leister	Neville Marriner	Academy of St Martin in the Fields	Philips
1990	Sabine Meyer	Hans Vonk	Staatskapelle Dresden	EMI
1992	David Shifrin	Gerard Schwarz	Mostly Mozart Festival	Delos
1993	Jacques Lancelot	Jean-François Paillard	Paillard Chamber	Erato
1994	Ernst Ottensamer	Colin Davis	Vienna Philharmonic	Philips
1998	Franklin Cohen	Christoph von Dohnányi	Cleveland	Decca
1988	Wolfgang Meyer	Nikolaus Harnoncourt	Vienna Concentus Musicus	Teldec
1998	Dieter Klöcker	Dieter Klöcker	Prague Chamber	MDG
1998	Sabine Meyer	Claudio Abbado	Berlin Philharmonic	EMI
2002	Charles Neidich	—	Orpheus Chamber Orchestra	Deutsche Grammophon
2003	Martin Fröst	Peter Oundjian	Amsterdam Sinfonietta	BIS
2004	Anthony Pike	Ralf Gothóni	English Chamber	Avie
2008	Joan Enric Lluna	Antony Pay	English Chamber	Cala Records
2010	Sebastian Manz	Cornelius Meister	Symphonieorchester des Bayerischen Rundfunks	BR Klassik
2011	Sharon Kam	Sharon Kam	Haydn Philharmonie	Berlin Classics
2012	Emma Johnson	Emma Johnson	Royal Philharmonic	Nimbus
2013	Michael Collins	Michael Collins	Swedish Chamber	Chandos
2013	Charles Neidich	—	Orchestra Solamente naturali	Bremen Radio Hall Records
2013	Patrick Messina	Riccardo Muti	Orchestre National de France	Radio France
2013	Alessandro Carbonare	Claudio Abbado	Orchestra Mozart	Deutsche Grammophon
2013	Martin Fröst	Martin Fröst	Deutsche Kammerphilharmonie Bremen	BIS
2014	Julian Bliss	Mario Venzago	Royal Northern Sinfonia	Signum Classics
2016	Jörg Widmann	Peter Ruzicka	Deutsches Symphonie-Orchester Berlin	Orfeo
2018	Roeland Hendrikx	Martyn Brabbins	London Philharmonic	EPR Classic
2018	Julien Hervé	Gustavo Gimeno	Rotterdam Philharmonic	NoMadMusic
2022	Sabine Meyer	Giovanni Antonini	Kammerorchester Basel	Alpha

Recordings made on period instruments include:

Year	Soloist	Conductor	Orchestra	Label
1990	Antony Pay	Christopher Hogwood	Academy of Ancient Music	Éditions de l'Oiseau-Lyre
1990	Colin Lawson	Roy Goodman	Hanover Band	Nimbus Records
2005	Gili Rinot	Doris Hagel	Capella Weilburgensis	Hänssler
2007	Lorenzo Coppola	Gottfried von der Goltz	Freiburger Barockorchester	Harmonia Mundi
2012	Benjamin Dieltjens	Leonardo García Alarcón	New Century Baroque	Ambronay
2013	Eric Hoeprich	Frans Brüggen	Orchestra of the Eighteenth Century	Philips; Glossa
2023	Pierre Génisson	Jakob Lehmann	Concerto Köln	Erato
2024	Ernst Schlader	Bernhard Forck	Akademie für Alte Musik Berlin	Pentatone
2025	Nicolas Baldeyrou	Michael Alexander Willens	Kölner Akademie	Alpha
