= Liebesfuß =

Pear-shaped bell of woodwind instruments

A Liebesfuß (alternate spelling: Liebesfuss) (German: [ˈliːbəsfuːs]; lit. 'love foot'; French: pavillon d'amour) is a pear- or bulb-shaped element that narrows to a small opening on double reed instruments, such as the oboe d'amore, cor anglais, and heckelphone, as well as on some single-reed instruments, such as the clarinet d'amore. It serves as a damper that gives these musical instruments a characteristically soft timbre. It is the eponymous characteristic of the oboe d'amore, which was developed in the baroque period alongside other particularly sweet-sounding instruments, such as the viola d'amore and the clarinet d'amore, which originated around 1740, but died out in the mid-19th century and was later redeveloped on the basis of a basset clarinet in G.

A slightly larger and 90-degree angled love foot, which can be rotated both forwards and backwards, can be found on historical basset clarinets, as well as on a modern basset clarinet that adopts this detail from a historical clarinet, as Charles Neidich did.

Examples of Liebesfüße

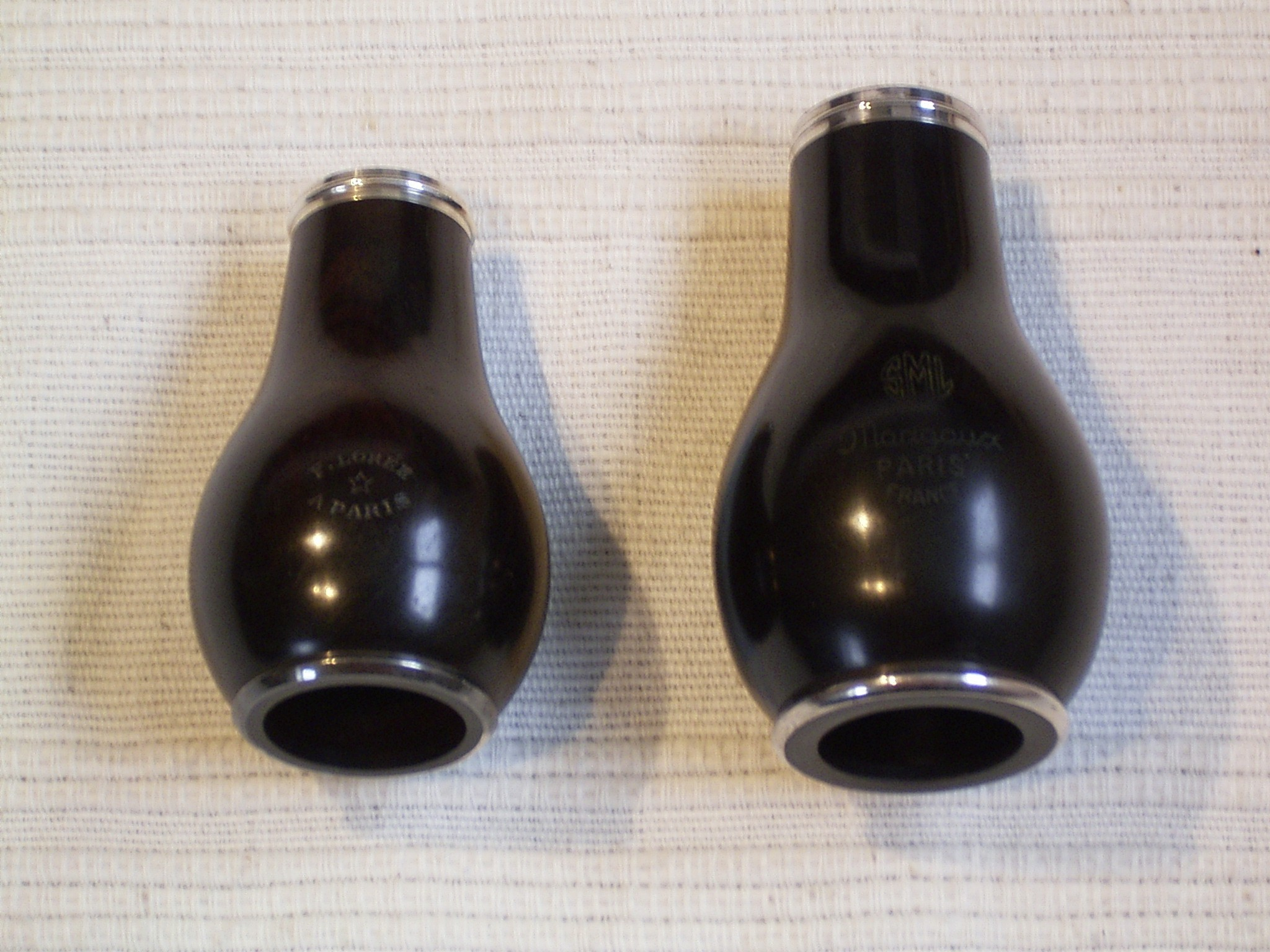
Oboe d'amore and cor anglais

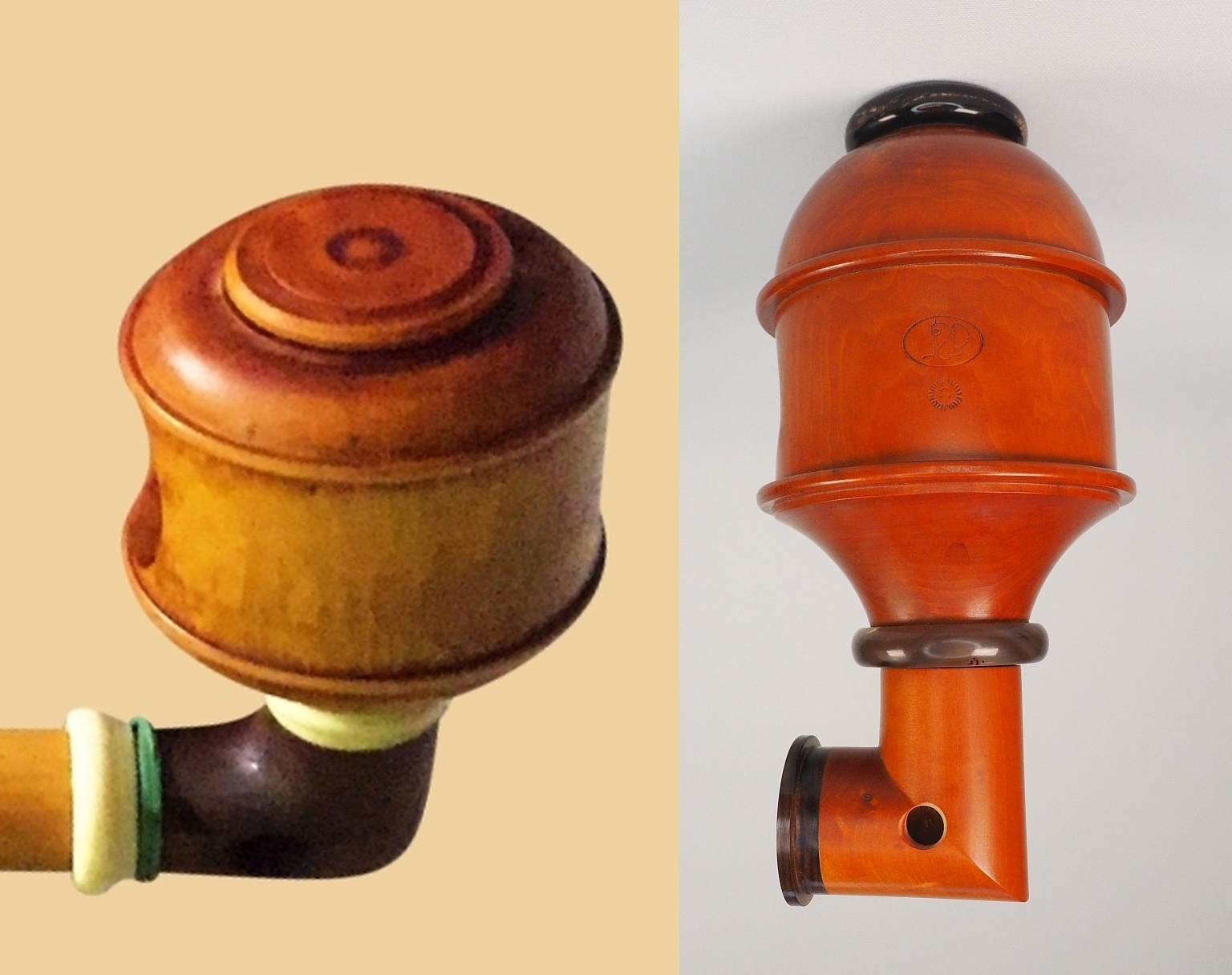
Historical basset clarinet and modern replica

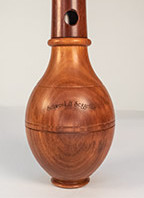
Modern clarinet d'amore (Seggelke)

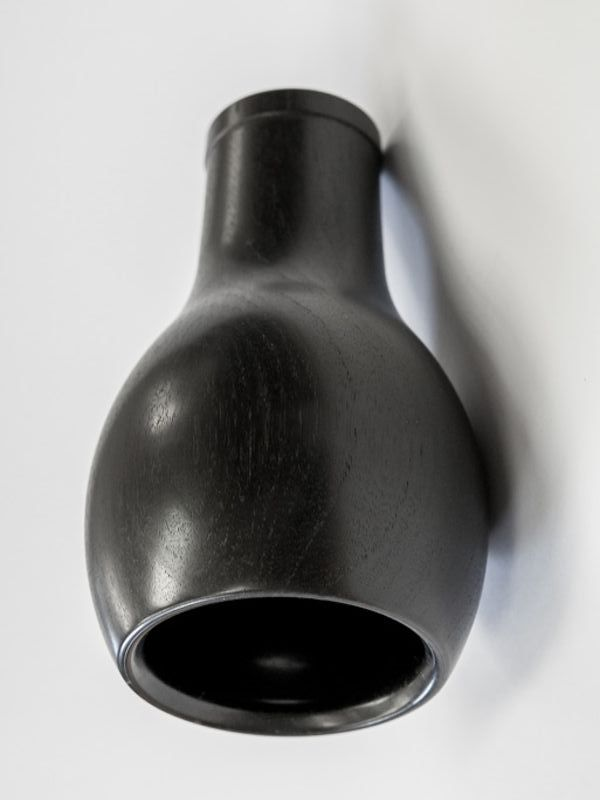
Modern clarinet d'amore (Gerold)

Instruments with a Liebesfuß

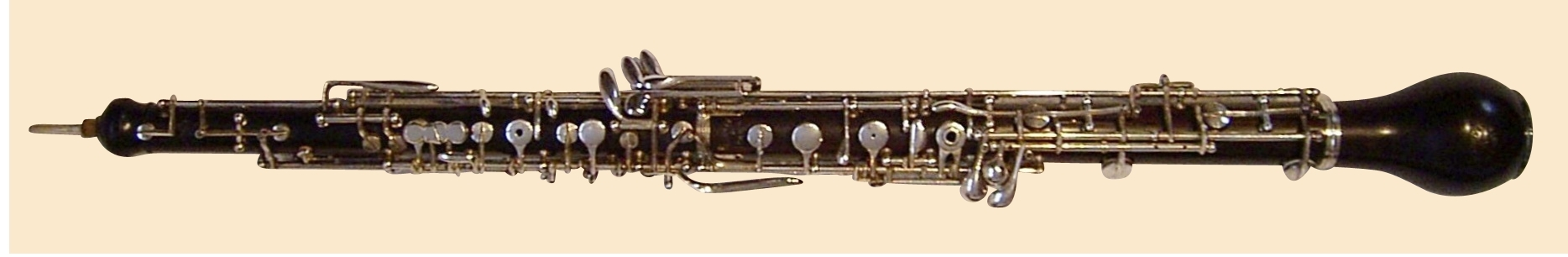
Oboe d'amore

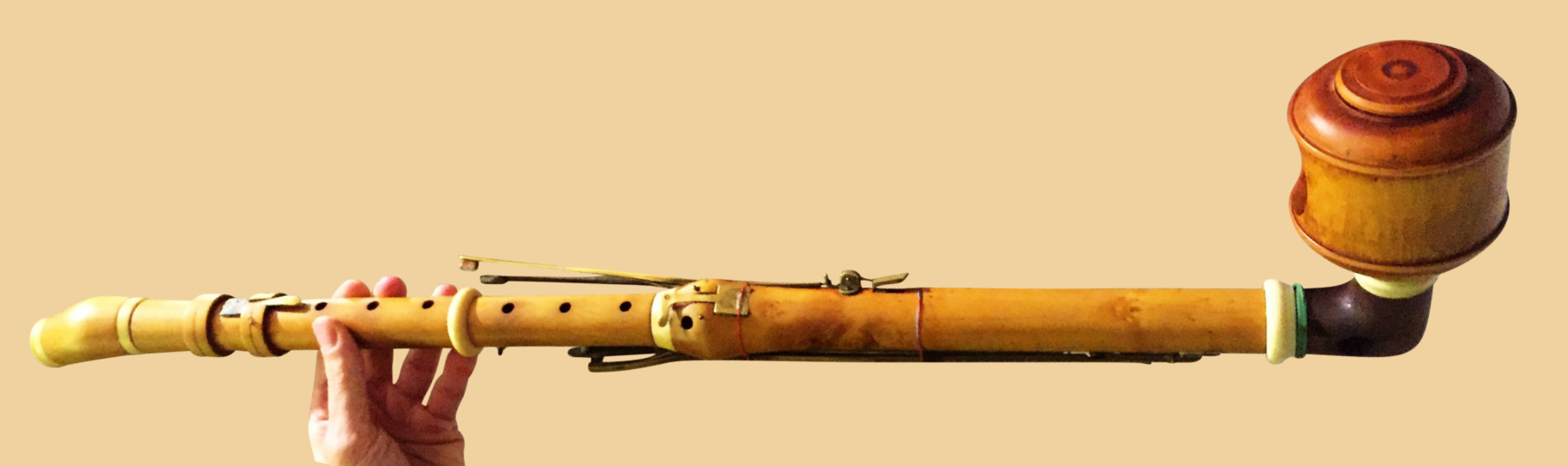
Historical basset clarinet

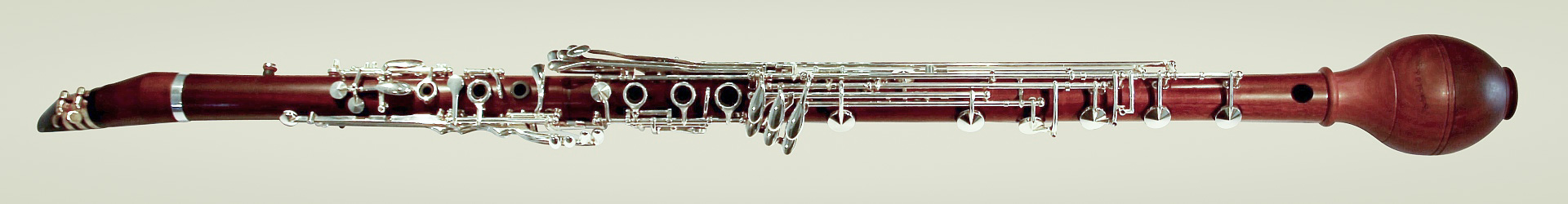
Modern Boehm clarinet d'amore

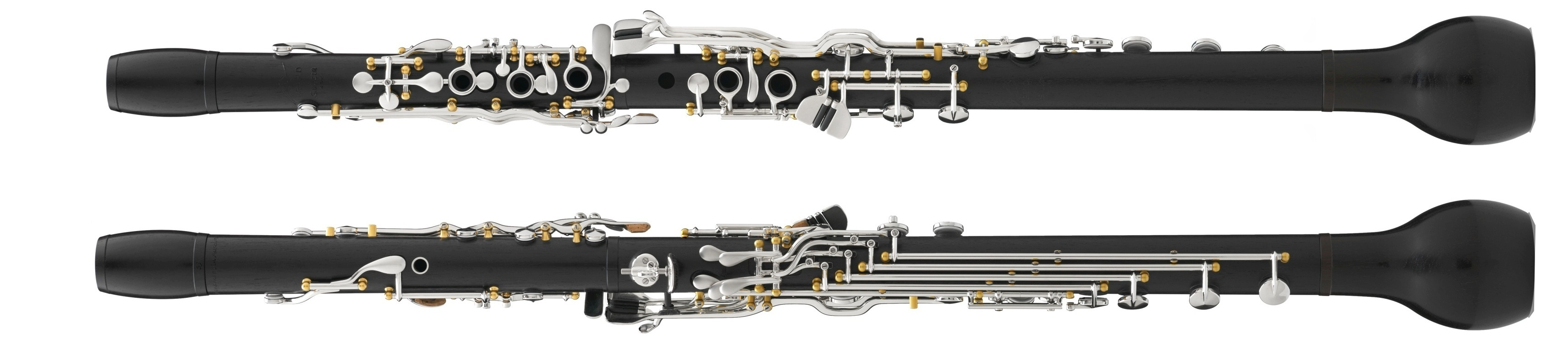
Modern German clarinet d'amore (Gerold)
