= Antony Pay =

English classical clarinetist (born 1945)

Antony Pay (born 21 February 1945 in London) is a classical clarinettist. After gaining a place with the National Youth Orchestra of Great Britain, with whom he performed the Mozart clarinet concerto at the age of 16, he studied at the Royal Academy of Music and then read Mathematics at Cambridge University, graduating in 1966.

Principal Clarinet positions include the Royal Philharmonic Orchestra from 1968 to 1978, London Sinfonietta (of which he was a founder member) from 1968 to 1983 and the Academy of St Martin in the Fields from 1976 to 1986. A member of several chamber ensembles he has worked with the Nash Ensemble, the Tuckwell Wind Quintet, the Academy of St Martin in the Fields Chamber Ensemble, and Hausmusik.

During his time with the London Sinfonietta he collaborated with a variety of composers, including Boulez, Stockhausen, Birtwistle, Henze, Maxwell Davies, Goehr and Berio. For the RCA he recorded Berio's Concertino, with the composer conducting, and gave the first performance of Henze's mini-concerto Miracle of the Rose, which was written for him to direct from the clarinet. He has previously been Professor of Clarinet at the Guildhall School of Music and Drama from 1982 to 1990, the Royal Academy of Music, the Music Academy Accademia Lorenzo Perosi in Biella and at Musikene - Centro Superior de Música del País Vasco in San Sebastián (Spain) from 2005 to 2018.

Recently he has concentrated on solo playing and conducting, recording the Spohr and Mozart Concertos for Decca, the Weber and Crusell Concertos for Virgin Classics and Birtwistle's Melencolia I for NMC. He has conducted the Academy of St Martin in the Fields in Germany, Austria and the Netherlands, and the London Sinfonietta throughout Europe, as well as guest-conducting with orchestras in Scandinavia, Italy and the United States.

Period performance on specially reconstructed instruments includes his recordings of the Mozart, Weber and Crusell Concertos. He currently works with The Academy of Ancient Music and the Orchestra of the Age of Enlightenment, with both of which he is a frequent soloist. His recording of the Mozart concerto with The AAM and Christopher Hogwood is available on Decca (414 339-2). He has written for the journal Early Music and The Cambridge Companion to the Clarinet. He is working on a book concerned mainly with the use of metaphor in teaching and learning to play the clarinet.
