= Johann Georg Heinrich Backofen =

Former German Musician and Painter (1768-1830?)

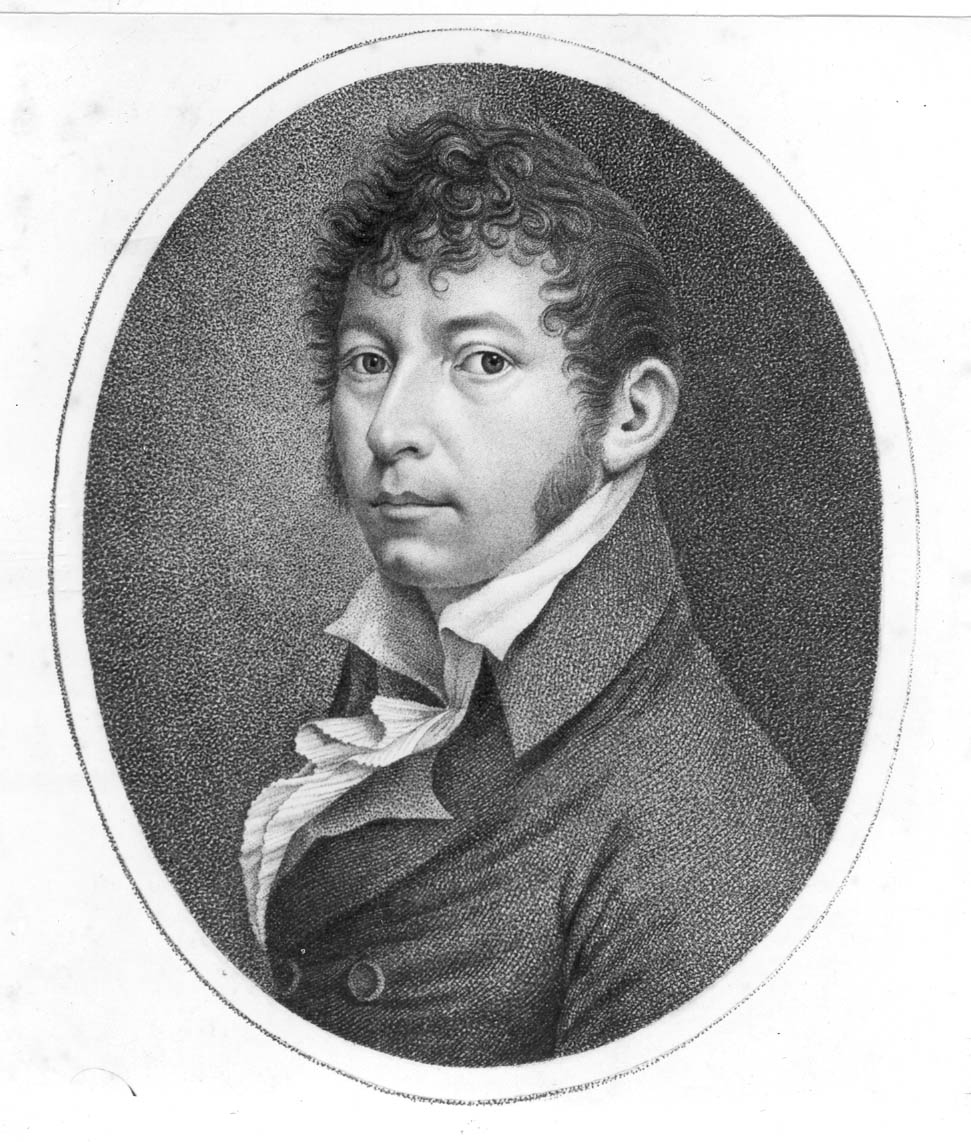
Johann Georg Heinrich Backofen

Johann Georg Heinrich Backofen (6 July 1768 in Durlach – 10 July 1830? in Darmstadt) was a German clarinetist, composer, and painter.

In his time, Backofen enjoyed great fame; he was not only known as a composer and virtuoso of the clarinet but also played the harp, flute, and basset horn.

His year of death is not known with certainty; the year 1839 is found in some documents.

== Selected works ==
- Deux valses et deux allemandes à deux et quatre mains pour le piano (2 Waltzes and 2 Allemandes for Piano 2- and 4-Hands), Op. 1 (published 1834)
- Concerto in B♭ major for clarinet and orchestra, Op. 3 (Bonn, 1809?)
- 13 Variazioni sull' aria "Ey mein lieber Augustin" for harp, Op. 4 (Hamburg, 1801)
- Concertante for harp, basset horn and cello ad libitum, Op. 7 (Leipzig, 1800?)
- Concertante for harp, viola and cello ad libitum, Op. 8
- Quintet in F major for basset horn and string quartet, Op. 9
- Sinfonia concertante in A major for 2 clarinets and orchestra, Op. 10 (Leipzig, 1810?)
- 3 Duos concertants for 2 clarinets, Op. 13 (Leipzig, 1803)
- Quintet for clarinet and string quartet, Op. 15 (Leipzig, 1805?)
- Concerto in E♭ major for clarinet and orchestra, Op. 16 (Leipzig, 1809?)
- Concerto in E♭ major for clarinet and orchestra, Op. 24 (Leipzig, 1821?)
- Grand Duo for 2 flutes, Op. 37
- Concerto in F major for basset horn and orchestra
- Concerto in F major for horn and orchestra (Leipzig, c.1823)
- 3 Duets for 2 clarinets (C major, G major, F major)
- 3 Menuette for harp
- Sonata in F major for violin (or flute) and harp
- Sonata for harp (and violin ad libitum) (Leipzig, 1795)
- Sonata facile for violin (or flute) and harp (or piano)
- Thema mit Variationen (Theme and Variations) for harp
- 16 Variations sur l'air "Ah! vous dirai je maman" for harp
- Variations for bassett horn and orchestra

Pedigogical

- Harfenschule mit Bemerkungen über den Bau der Harfe und deren neuere Verbesserungen (Harp School) (Leipzig, 1801)
- Anweisung zur Klarinette (Neue teoretisch-prachtische Klarinett Schule) nebst einer kurzen Abhandlung über das Bassett-Horn (Leipzig, 1803)
- Anweisung zur Klarinette, mit besonderer Hinsicht auf die in neuern Zeiten diesem Instrument beigefügten Klappen (completely revised edition of the above) (Leipzig, 1824)

== Recordings ==
Backofen: Clarinet Concertos
