= Ernst Hess (composer) =

Ernst Hess (13 May 1912 – 2 November 1968) was a Swiss conductor, composer and musicologist.

== Career ==
Born in Schaffhausen, Hess studied at the conservatory of Zurich from 1932 and 1934, and then at the Ecole Normale de Musique de Paris, with Paul Dukas and Nadia Boulanger among others. From 1935 he worked in Switzerland as conductor of several choirs and orchestras. In 1938, he was appointed lecturer of music theory at the conservatory of Winterthur. From 1956, he taught musicology at the University of Zurich.

As a composer, he wrote mostly sacred and secular choral music, namely the oratorio Jeremia. He was awarded the composition prize of the Conrad-Ferdinand-Meyer-Stiftung in 1947. In 1966 he received the Hans-Georg-Nägeli-Medaille of Zurich.

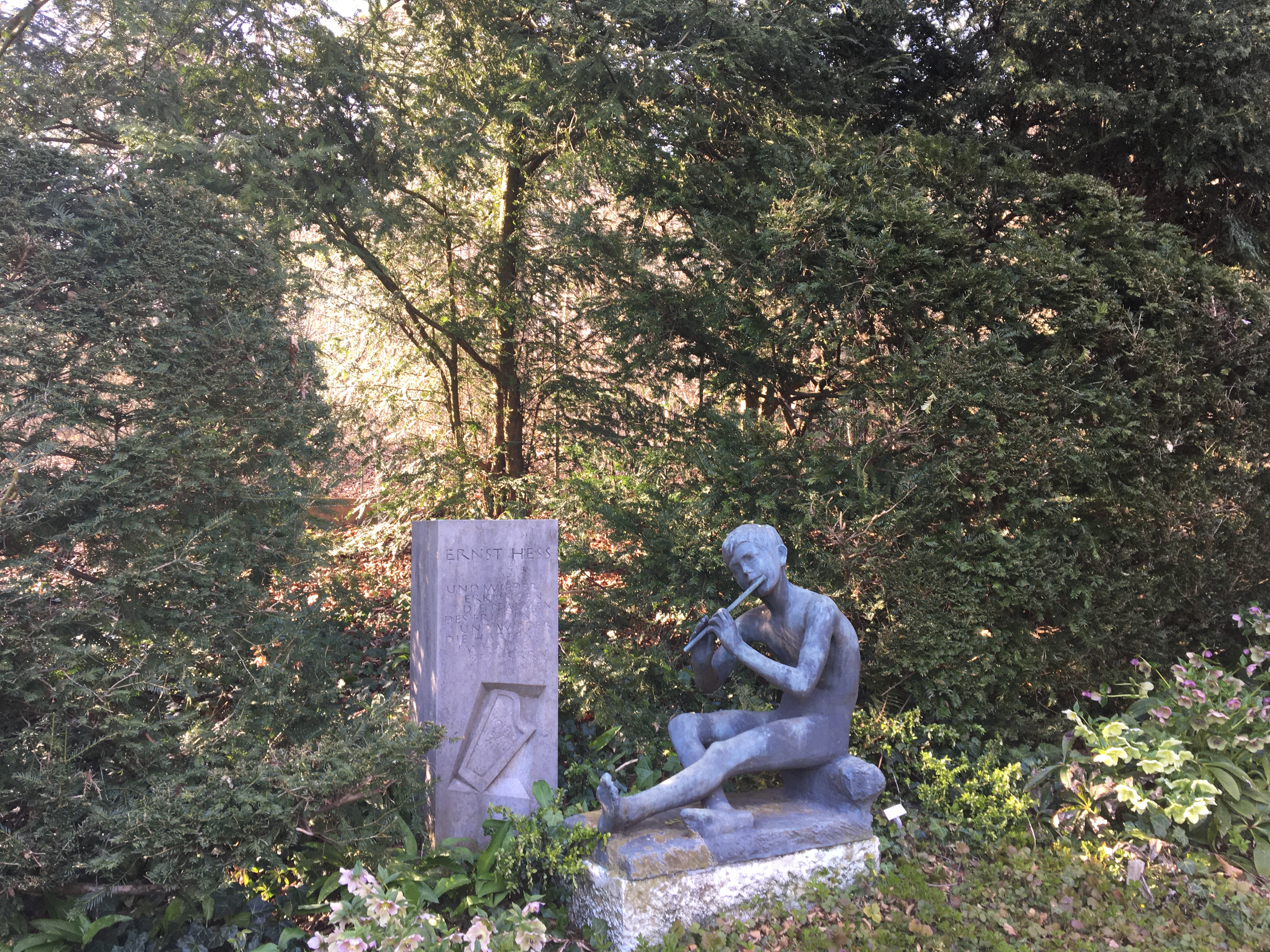
The grave of Ernst Hess at Fluntern Cemetery

Hess died in Egg and is buried at the Fluntern Cemetery in Zürich.

== Selected works ==
- Suite for Guitar Solo (1935); Hug G.H. 11468
- Suite for Viola Solo, Op. 14 (1936)
- Concerto for Viola, Cello and Chamber Orchestra, Op. 20
- Sinfonia academia (Kleine Sinfonia), Op. 22
- Concerto for Horn and Chamber Orchestra, Op. 24
- Concerto for Violin and Orchestra, Op. 27
- Kleine Musik, for basset horn, violin, viola and cello, Op. 29b (Amadeus Verlag BP 543)
- Sinfonia concertante, for violin, piano and orchestra, Op. 55
- Unter Dach und Himmel, three poems by Werner Weber for men's chorus (TTBB), alto solo and piano, Op. 56 (Hug G.H. 10624)
- Capriccio, for trombone and piano, Op. 57 (Helbling Best.-Nr. 10231)
- Concerto da camera, for cello and chamber orchestra, Op. 63
- Wenn im Unendlichen, after Johann Wolfgang Goethe, for mixed choir a cappella (Hug G.H. 10904)
- Schweizergebet, on a text by Rudolf Hägni, for mixed choir and organ ad lib (Hug G.H. 9319)
- Zeitgenössische Orgelmusik im Gottesdienst (contemporary music in the church service) (Edition Eulenburg)
