= Alessandro Carbonare =

Alessandro Carbonare (born 3 September 1967) is an Italian clarinetist.

Carbonare started on E♭ clarinet at age 5. At age 21 he became co-principal of the Lyon Opera Orchestra, and later joined the Orchestre National de France. He has been the principal clarinetist with the Orchestra di Santa Cecilia in Rome since 2003. He has played principal with the Berlin Philharmonic. He also plays with Quintetto Bibiena.

He has been teaching at the Accademia Musicale Chigiana since 2011.

Carbonare plays a Selmer Recital clarinet and a Vandoren B40 mouthpiece (which he adjusted by hand).

== Discography ==
- The art of the clarinet. Decca, 2008.
- W.A. Mozart - Quintetto per clarinetto e archi K581 / J. Brahms - Quintetto per clarinetto e archi op. 115. Amadeus, 2007.
- Clarinet Sings Opera. Japan Import, 2006.
- Carl Maria von Weber: Concertos for Clarinet and Orchestra, with the Haydn Orchestra Bozen. Art Music, 2004.
- No Man's Land, with Andrea Dindo. Velut Luna, 2003.
- Unus Inter Pares. Velut Luna, 2002.
- La Clarinette à l'Opéra : Paraphrases of Italian Operas for Clarinet and Piano. Harmonia Mundi, 2001.
- Piramidi, with Luca Donini. Splasc(h), 2001.
- Mozart K622, Beethoven Piano Concerto Op. 15, with Marta Argerich and the Orchestra del Festival. Musincom, 2001.
- Brahms, Mozart. Harmonia Musica, 1999.
- Robert Schumann: Marchennerzalungen Op. 132, Romanzen Op. 94, Fantasiestuck Op. 73, Märchenbilder Op. 113, with Simone Braconi and Andrea Dindo. Agorà, 1997.
- W.A. Mozart Clarinet Concerto K622, G. Rossini - Andante tema e variazioni - Variazioni in Do, with Pforzheim Chamber Orchestra. Agorà, 1997.
- Mozart, Salieri, with Euroensemble. Banca CRT, 1997.
- Modest Mussorgsky: Pictures at an Exhibition, with Quintetto Bibiena. Agorà, 1996.
- Clarinet Sings Verdi. Agorà, 1995.
- Il Quintetto Bibiena. Ermitage Aura, 1995.
- Francis Poulenc: Ouvres pour instruments à vent et piano, with Quintetto Bibiena and Andrea Dindo. Agorà, 1995.
- Johannes Brahms: Trio for Clarinet, Cello and Piano Op. 114, Sonates for Clarinet and Piano Op. 120, with Marco Decimo and Andrea Dindo. Agorà, 1994.
