= Charles Neidich =

American clarinetist, composer, and conductor

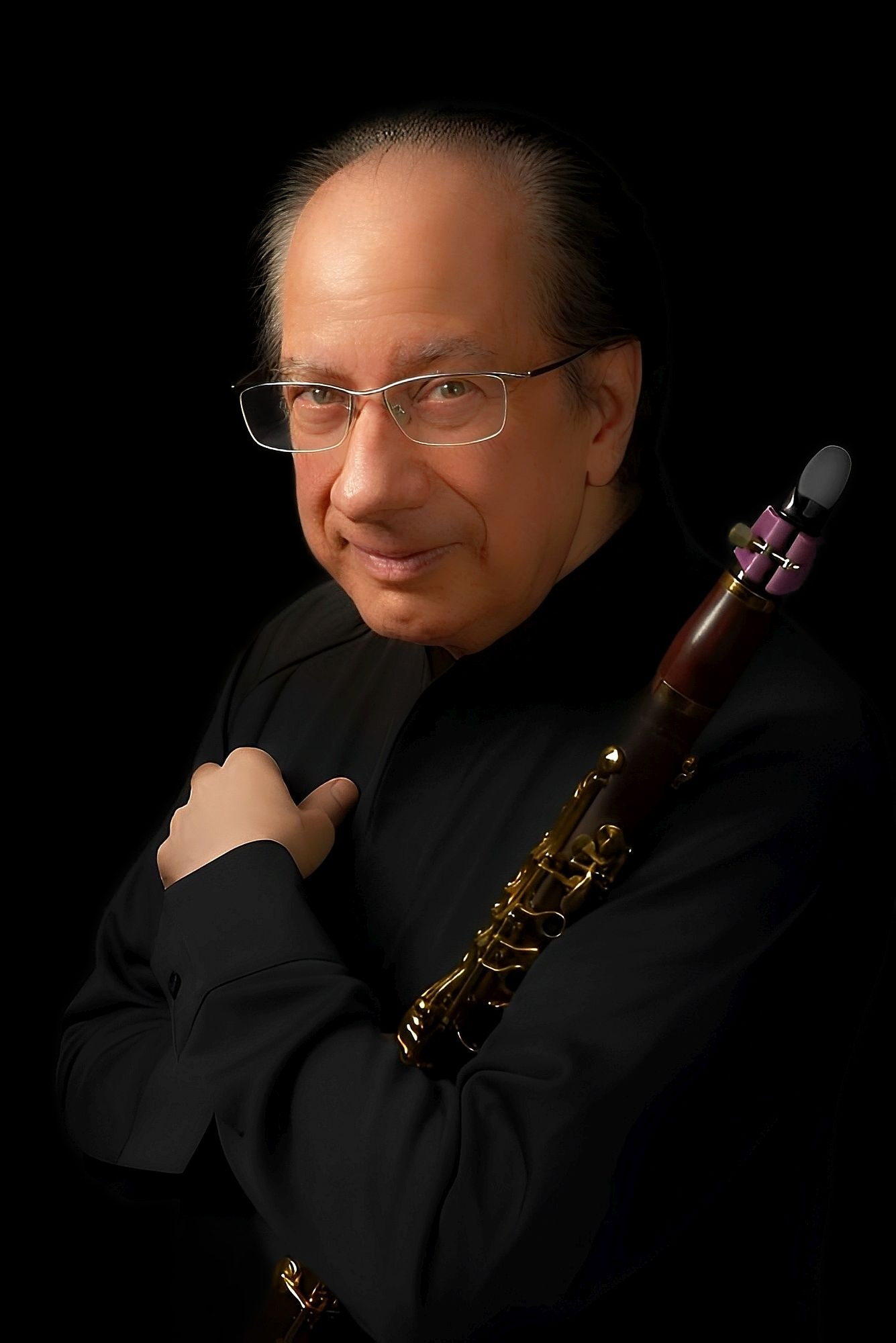
- Charles Neidich, Stadler-clarinet with Boehm system

Background information
- Born: 1953 (age 71–72); New York City
- Genres: Classical music, contemporary music
- Instruments: Clarinets in B♭, A and C, basset clarinets in A, modern and historical instruments
- Years active: 1974–present
- Website: www.charlesneidich.net

Charles Neidich (born 1953 in New York City) is an American classical clarinetist, composer, and conductor.

== Early career ==
A native New Yorker of Russian and Greek descent, Charles Neidich began his clarinet studies with his father, Irving Neidich, at the age of eight, and continued them with the renowned teacher Leon Russianoff and, later in Moscow, with Boris Dikov. His reputation has grown steadily since his 1974 New York recital début while still a student at Yale. A series of prizes helped launch his early career: the Silver Medal in the 1979 Geneva International Music Competition, Second Prize in the 1982 Munich International Competition and one of three Grand Prizes in the 1984 Accanthes International Competition in Paris. In 1985, he won the first major clarinet competition in the United States, the Walter W. Naumburg Competition, which catapulted him into prominence as a soloist.

== Accomplishments ==
Neidich has been influential in restoring original versions of works and bringing them before the public. A list of the clarinet classics he has restored to their original form includes works as diverse as the Mozart Concerto, concertos of Weber and Copland, the Soireestücke of Robert Schumann, and the Andante and Allegro of Ernest Chausson. Neidich supporter of new music and has premiered works by Milton Babbitt, Elliott Carter, Edison Denisov, Helmut Lachenmann, William Schuman, Ralph Shapey, Joan Tower, Katia Tchemberdji, Vasilii Lobanov and others. He has championed John Corigliano's Concerto, performing it throughout the United States notably with the Syracuse Symphony Orchestra and Jacksonville Symphony Orchestra in performances. Neidich made numerous recordings on both modern and historical instruments, both as soloist and with his period-instrument wind ensemble Mozzafiato.

Neidich turned his attention to conducting, appearing with the Avanti chamber Orchestra, Tapiola Sinfonietta, Helsinki, the Kirishima Festival in Japan, with the New World and the San Diego Symphony (in a triple role of conductor, soloist, and composer), and in Bulgaria with the Plovdiv State Philharmonic.

He was professor of clarinet at the Eastman School of Music (1985–1989) before joining the faculty of the Juilliard School of Music, the Manhattan School of Music, and Mannes College The New School for Music.

In 2003 and 2005, he was a soloist with the Naumburg Orchestral Concerts, in the Naumburg Bandshell, Central Park (NY), summer series.
