= Samuel Andreyev =

Canadian composer

Samuel Andreyev (born Samuel Curnoe Andreeff; 15 April 1981) is a Canadian-French composer, singer-songwriter, poet and educator. As of 2021, he had completed about 30 works, nearly all of which have been recorded commercially. His YouTube channel, his videos, interviews and podcasts have been viewed extensively. He has resided in France since 2003 and currently teaches at the Hochschule für Musik Freiburg and at the Strasbourg Center of the University of Syracuse.

== Life and career ==
Andreyev was born and raised in Kincardine, Ontario, moving with his family to Toronto in 1988. There he enrolled in The Royal Conservatory of Music, studying cello and oboe, as well as composition. Additionally, he experimented on his own, fascinated by rare instruments and the possibilities offered by recording technology. While living in Toronto, he recorded 8 albums of songs, ran a small publishing house devoted to experimental poetry, performed with a troupe of local musicians, and completed his first acknowledged composition, Le malheur adoucit les pierres for wind trio.

He settled in Paris in 2003 to study composition, initially with Allain Gaussin, then with Frédéric Durieux at the Paris Conservatoire. Shortly after graduating, he was named a member of the Académie de France à Madrid and offered a 1-year artistic residency at the Casa de Velázquez. Upon returning to France in 2013, he took up teaching positions, initially at the Conservatoire de Cambrai, and later at the Strasbourg Center of the University of Syracuse, and the Hochschule für Musik Freiburg.

In the mid-2010s his work began to receive much wider attention, receiving major awards, including the Grand Prix du concours Henri Dutilleux in 2012 for his composition Night Division.

He settled in Strasbourg in 2014. Starting in 2015, he embarked upon an ambitious project of making commercial recordings of all of his works. So far, 4 portrait CDs have been issued along with many individual works on various labels. In 2018, he was named a member of the music council of the Fondation Prince Pierre de Monaco. In 2024, he became a French citizen.

Andreyev composed the score to Ryusuke Hamaguchi‘s feature All of a Sudden (2026 film).

=== Poetry ===
Also a poet and writer, Andreyev has published two collection of poems: Evidence was issued in 2009 by Quattro Books of Toronto; The Relativistic Empire was published by Bookthug in 2015. A book of conversations about his life and work, written in collaboration with the French composer and musicologist Etienne Kippelen, was scheduled to be issued in the fall of 2021.

=== Public commentary and teaching ===
Andreyev is active as a teacher and public commentator on music and related cultural topics. In addition to his compositional work, he has produced educational content and lectures, particularly through online platforms, addressing subjects such as music theory, analysis, and aesthetics. These engagements include presentations for conservative instutitions the Alliance for Responsible Citizenship and Ralston College.

He has also appeared as a guest on various podcasts and interview programmes, notably those advocating traditional Western values, where discussions have included music, artistic practice, and broader cultural issues.

== Select discography ==
=== Compositions ===
- Le malheur adoucit les pierres for bass flute, English horn and bassoon (2002)
- Music with no Edges for five instruments (2004)
- Passages for clarinet (2005)
- Stopping for two vibraphones (2006)
- Nets Move Slowly, Yet for ensemble (2006)
- Night Division for ensemble (2008–10)
- Vérifications for ensemble (2012)
- A propos du concert de la semaine dernière for piano and 7 instruments (2013–15)
- Strasbourg Quartet for flute, clarinet, percussion and cello (2014–15)
- Piano Pieces I-IV for piano (2011–16)
- Iridescent Notation cantata on texts by Tom Raworth for soprano and ensemble (2012–17)
- In Glow of Like Seclusion cantata on texts by JH Prynne for soprano and ensemble (2021–22)
- Contingency Icons for chamber orchestra (2023)
- Blue Songs on texts by Daniel f Bradley for soprano and piano (2024)

=== Albums ===
- Soudain: Original Soundtrack (London: Divine Art, 2026)
- In Glow of Like Seclusion (London: Divine Art, 2023)
- Iridescent Notation (Vienna: Kairos Records, 2020)
- Music with no Edges (Vienna: Kairos Records, 2018)
- Moving (Paris: Klarthe Records, 2016)
- Compositeurs de la Casa de Velázquez (Madrid: Casa de Velázquez 2013)
- The Tubular West (Toronto: Torpor Vigil Records 2013)
- Songs of Elsewhere (Toronto: Torpor Vigil Records 2002)
- Swollows (Toronto: Torpor Vigil Records 2000)

== Film scores ==
Soudain (All of the Sudden), dir. Ryusuke Hamaguchi, 2026

== Bibliography ==
- 2009 - Evidence
- 2015 - The Relativistic Empire ISBN 9781771661720, 1771661720
- 2018 - A Needy Chap

== Sources ==
- Evidence (Toronto: Quattro Books, 2009)
