= Schwenk & Seggelke =

German clarinet manufacturer

Seggelke Klarinetten GmbH & Co. KG
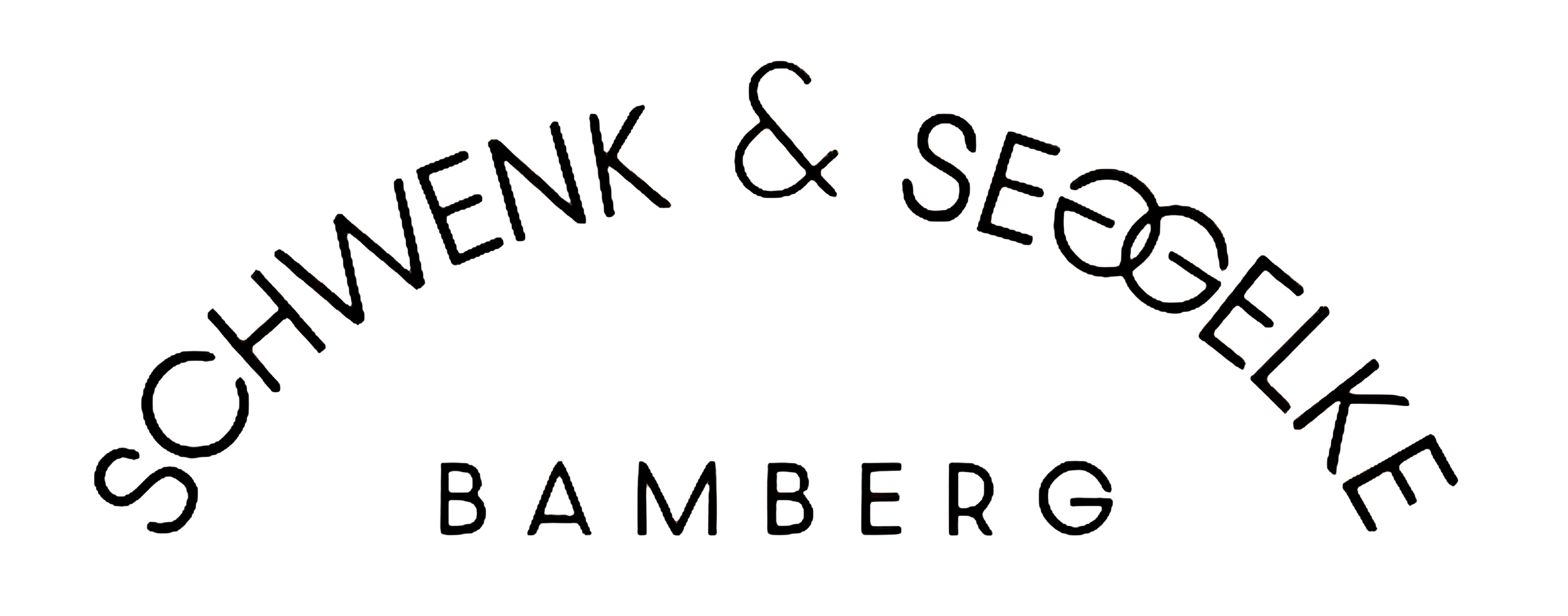
- Genre: instrument makers
- Founded: 1996 as Schwenk & Seggelke. In 2020 the name was changed to Seggelke Klarinetten GmbH & Co. KG.
- Headquarters: Bamberg Germany
- Key people: Jochen Seggelke
- Products: Clarinets
- Number of employees: 15 (2019)
- Website: Website english

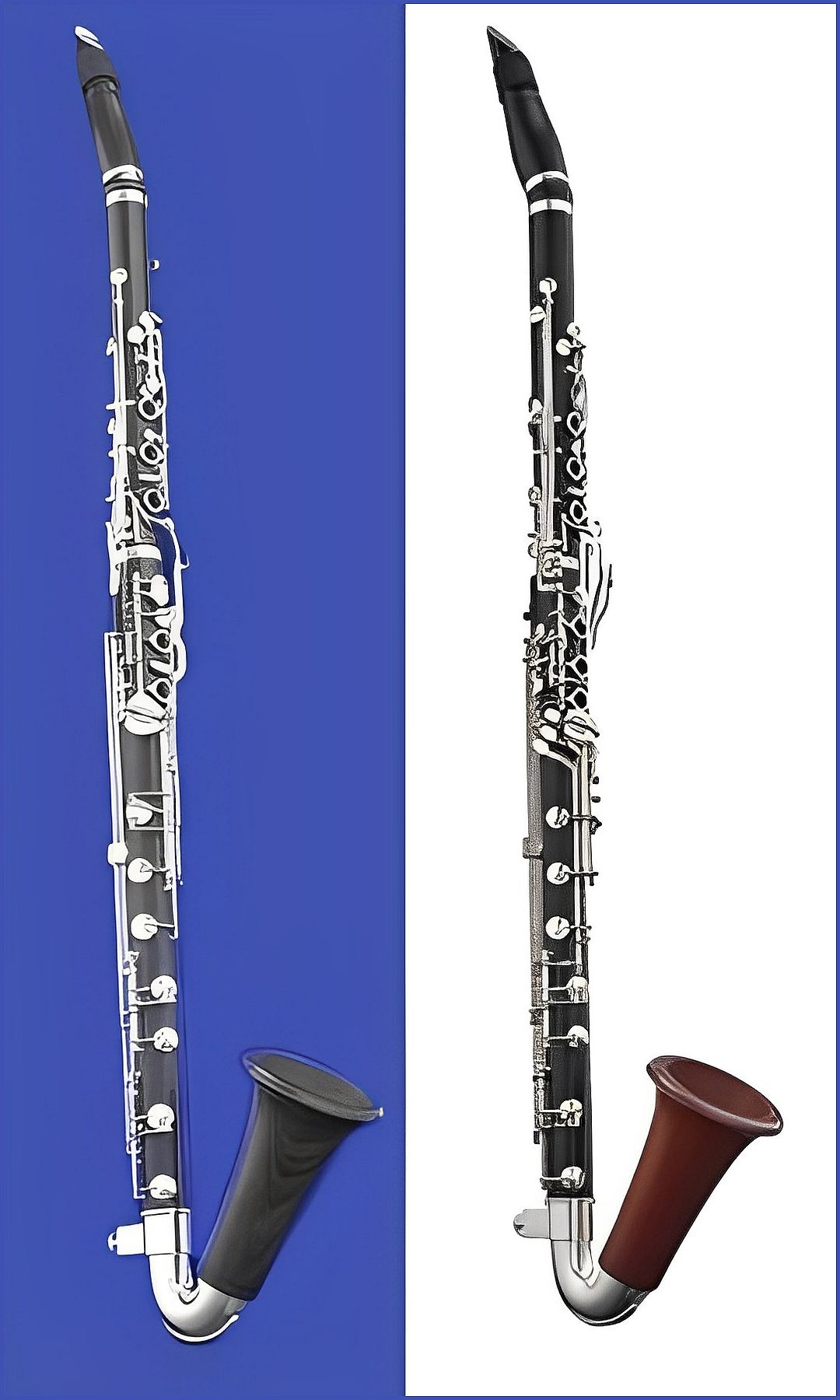
Basset horn, German and French System, awarded several times

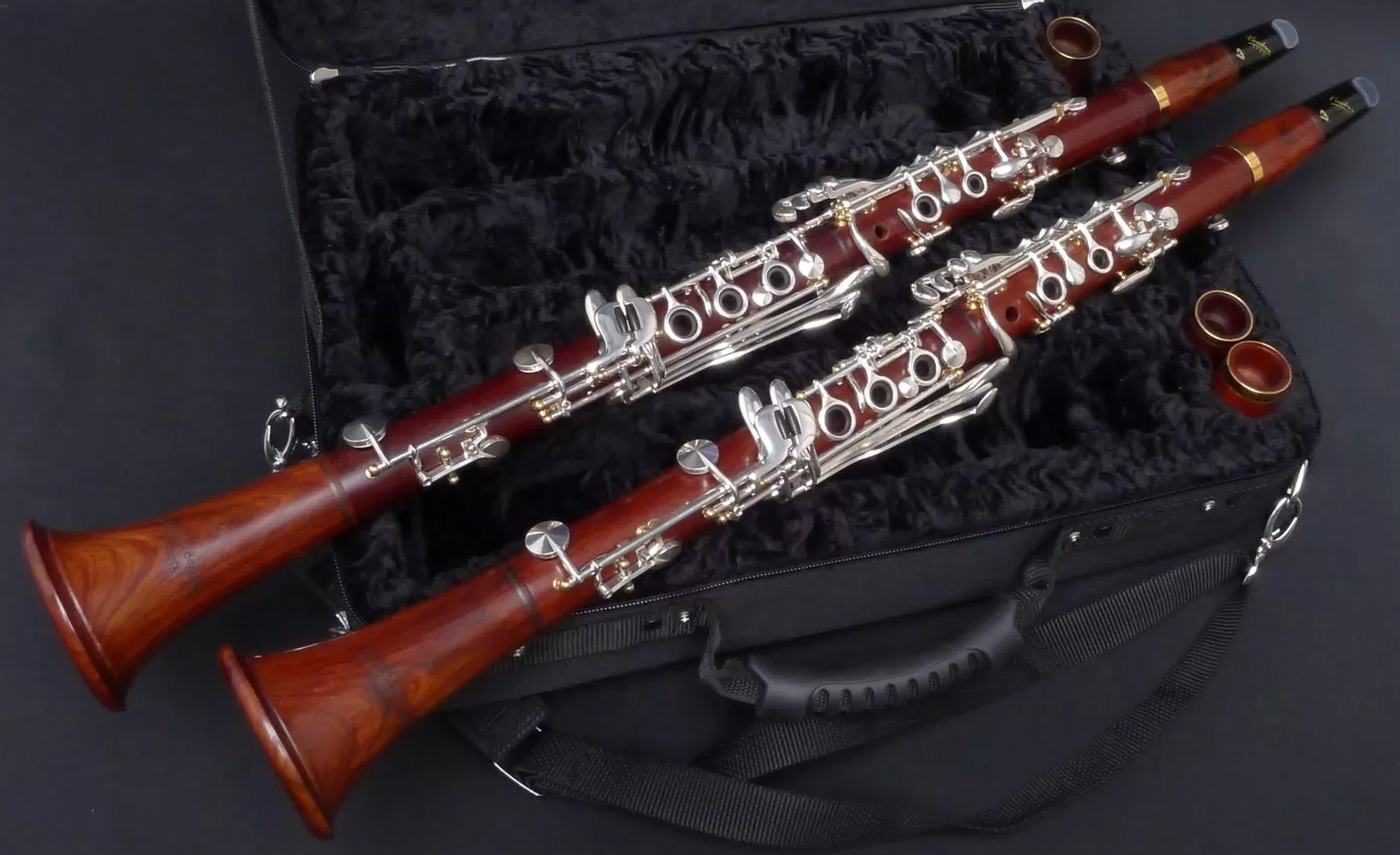
Set of clarinets (in A and Bb) from mopane, French System

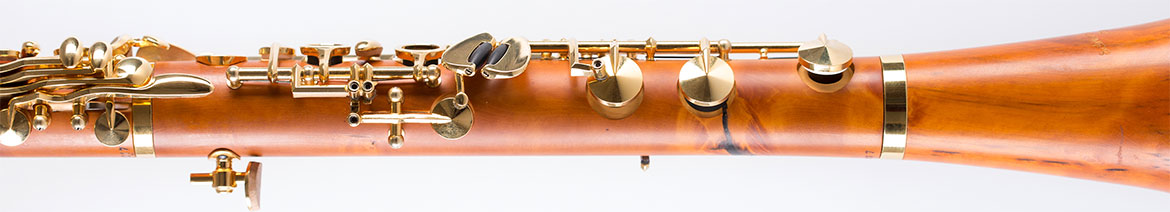
Part of boxwood clarinet (german system)

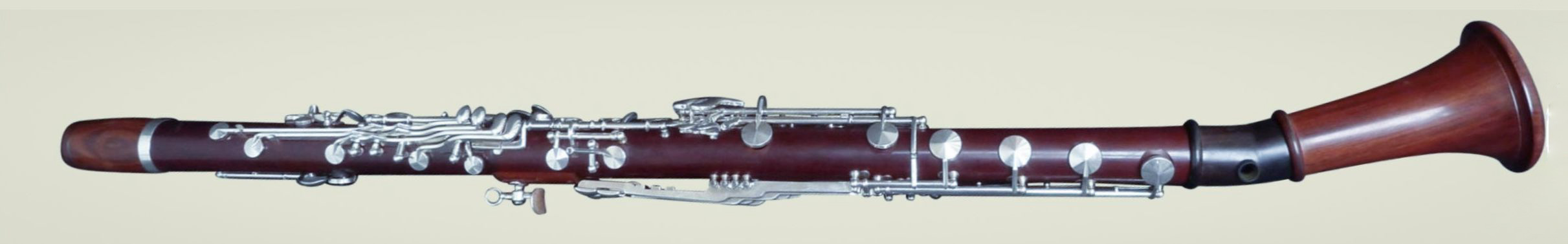
Basset clarinet from cocobolo with bell pointed upwards (French system)

Seggelke Klarinetten (GmbH & Co. KG), is a German clarinet manufacturer based in Bamberg in Bavarian Upper Franconia. The company manufactures clarinets of a variety of fingering systems. A specialty of the company is the reproduction of historical clarinets.

== History ==
The company was founded in 1996 as a company by the clarinet maker Werner Schwenk and the clarinet maker and clarinetist Jochen Seggelke, based in Tübingen and Bamberg. In 1998, the two production facilities were merged in Bamberg. In 2002, the company moved there larger premises. The co-shareholder Werner Schwenk retired from the company in 2013, which has since been continued by Jochen Seggelke as a sole proprietorship. In 2020 the company was transferred to the newly founded company Seggelke Klarinetten GmbH & Co. KG. The name Schwenk and Seggelke will be continued as a brand name (label).

== Products ==
The company keys its clarinets according to the German Oehler system and the French Boehm system as well as in a combination of both systems, starting from the Boehm system (so-called modular design).

In all three systems, the company offers the full range of clarinets from high A♭ to low G, including basset clarinets in A, B♭, and G, as well as an F basset horn and a B♭ bass clarinet. All basset and bass clarinets and basset horns extend down to a low C.

All instruments are individually configurable in terms of equipment (bore, type of wood, mechanical equipment, and their finishing). There are also replicas of 10 historical instruments in different moods, of which two models are offered in B♭ and A. Not in the program: the alto clarinet in E flat (looks similar to a basset horn) and the extremely rare contra alto clarinet.

The manufacturer S & S has developed several improvements of the mechanics and the soundhole drilling for their clarinets. All instruments are made of wood, mainly of grenadilla wood, but also cocobolo, mopane and boxwood are available, the latter, especially for the historical replicas. The instruments are built to order and primarily for professional clarinetists and are in the top price range. In addition, S & S sells clarinets in the low and middle price range produced by the company F. Arthur Uebel, in a revised form in their own workshop. Since 2014 Jochen Seggelke avised this company in acoustic and technical questions.

== Awards ==
In March 2006, the newly developed basset horn was awarded the Bavarian State Prize, after S & S already received a design award in 2004. Instead of the usual metal bow between the mouthpiece and the upper joint, the instrument is equipped with a normal barrel and a bent connecting piece between the barrel and the upper joint each made of wood. In 2013, the E flat clarinet model 2000 received the German Musical Instrument Award.

== Sales areas ==
Around one-third of Seggelke Klarinetten products are sold in Germany, the rest in Europe and overseas.
