= Leon Russianoff =

American clarinetist and teacher (1916–1990)

- Russianoff at the International Clarinet Clinic

Background information
- Born: August 19, 1916; Brooklyn, New York, US
- Died: September 16, 1990 (aged 74) (Note: Russianoff's age at death is based on his birthdate as given in Clark 1983, p. 6, which contradicts The New York Times 1938 and The News-Times 1990, p. 14.) St. Luke's–Roosevelt Hospital Center, Manhattan, New York, US
- Occupations: Clarinetist; Music teacher

Leon Russianoff (August 19, 1916 – September 16, 1990) was an American clarinetist, primarily known for his teaching career. He was a founding member of the International Clarinet Society, serving as the organization's first vice-president from 1973 to 1976 and contributing to the early International Clarinet Clinics in Denver. Russianoff's students included many orchestral principals and soloists in the United States.

Born in Brooklyn, New York, Russianoff won a scholarship to study with Simeon Bellison, the principal clarinetist of the New York Philharmonic. Russianoff never studied music at a college and instead pursued a Bachelor of Science in English and Sociology at the City College of New York from 1933 to 1938. He continued his lessons with Bellison while studying for his degree and taking on his first private students. Russianoff parted ways with Bellison in 1940 and began teaching at the Third Street Music School Settlement and The Contemporary Music School. After prolonged performance difficulties, Russianoff opened a teaching studio but continued to perform in Broadway theatre. His anxiety continued to affect his playing; he tried to continue to perform professionally, but left to devote himself fully to teaching. Russianoff subsequently served on the faculties of the Manhattan School of Music (from 1955) and the Juilliard School (from c. 1970), among others.

Russianoff was described by his biographer Stephen Lee Clark as "one of the most effective and successful clarinet teachers in the world", and by Joan Waryha Porter as the "Godfather of American clarinetists": his pupils included Stanley Drucker, Charles Neidich, Jimmy Hamilton, David Krakauer, Bob Wilber, and Michele Zukovsky, among many others. Russianoff's teaching was based on the fundamentals of technique, as described in his Clarinet Method. His teaching philosophy was strongly influenced by his wife, Penelope, a psychologist and socialite, as well as the bassoonist Simon Kovar and the author Timothy Gallwey; Russianoff aimed to create a relationship built on mutual respect and positive reinforcement so individuality and creativity could be preserved. After his death, several memorial concerts were organized by his former pupils, and the Leon Russianoff Memorial Scholarship was introduced at the Manhattan School. Russianoff's teaching was posthumously honored by both the International Clarinet Association and the World Clarinet Alliance, and has been the subject of doctoral scholarship.

== Early life and education ==
Leon Russianoff was born to Sarah and Isadore Russianoff on August 19, 1916, in Brooklyn, New York. His parents were Jewish immigrants; Isadore emigrated from Russia c. 1900, and Sarah emigrated from Galicia. After emigrating, Isadore settled in a neighborhood near Hester Street on Manhattan's Lower East Side, where he lived while he attended high school and trained to become a dentist.

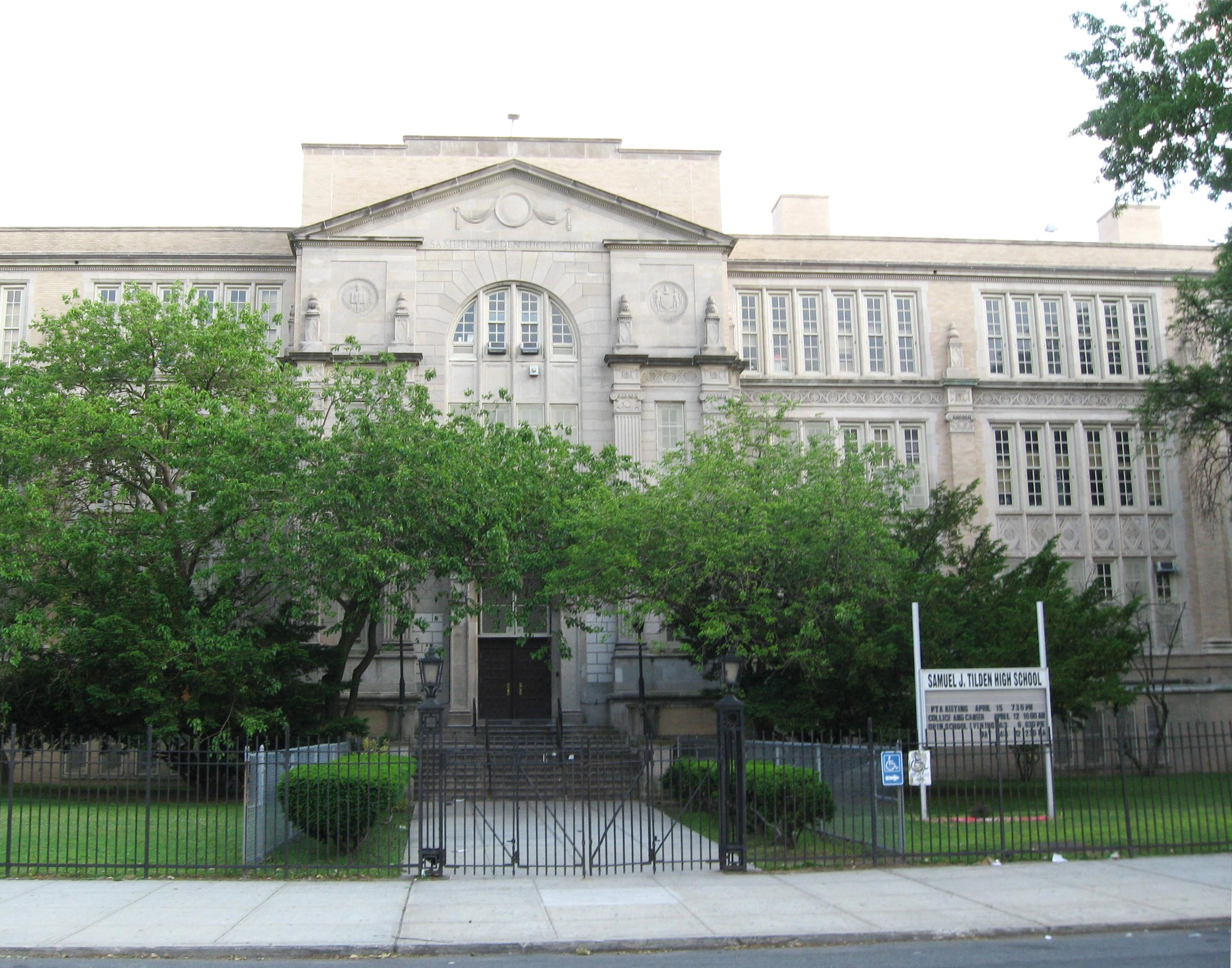
Russianoff attended Samuel J. Tilden High School in Brooklyn, and was a member of the school's brass band and orchestra.

Leon Russianoff attended St. Clair McKelway Junior High School in Brooklyn, graduating in 1930; he later attended Samuel J. Tilden High School, also in Brooklyn. The young Russianoff started learning clarinet during his time at high school: at his mother's urging, he had previously tried violin (which he strongly disliked), piano, drums, and xylophone before settling on the clarinet at age 14. Russianoff first studied with Dominic Tramontano, a clarinetist who played vaudeville, film, and fiesta music. During his time at high school, Russianoff was a member of his school's orchestra and brass band. Upon his graduation in 1933, he was awarded the Tilden Symphony Society Medal "for outstanding ability and service" to the school orchestra.

Around this time, Russianoff ceased lessons with Tramontano after winning a scholarship from the Philharmonic-Symphony Society of New York to study with Simeon Bellison, the principal clarinetist of the New York Philharmonic. According to Russianoff's biographer, Stephen Lee Clark, these rigidly structured lessons with Bellison were a significant source of anxiety for Russianoff, and ultimately contributed to his becoming a teacher instead of a performer. Besides his formal studies, Russianoff played B♭ clarinet alongside Kalman Bloch (later principal clarinet of the Los Angeles Philharmonic) in the Bellison Ensemble, an early American clarinet choir.

Russianoff never took a college-level music class; Ann McCutchan, a writer for The Instrumentalist, attributed this partially to his negative experiences with Bellison. Instead, he pursued a Bachelor of Science in English and Sociology at the City College of New York (1933–June 1938). During this time, Russianoff continued his lessons with Bellison, successfully auditioned for Léon Barzin's National Orchestral Association, and took on his first two students – Martin Zwick and Jack Kreiselman, both referred to him by Bellison. Upon graduation, he began teaching professionally. Sometime before 1940, he became an active member of Local 802 of the American Federation of Musicians (Greater New York) and remained a part of the union for more than 50 years.

== Career ==
After amicably ending his studies with Bellison in 1940, Russianoff began teaching at the Third Street Music School Settlement and The Contemporary Music School. Around this time, (Note: Clark 1983, p. 16, claims he started teaching Drucker in 1939, while Masiello 2009, p. 4, claims it was in 1941.) he began to teach Stanley Drucker, then aged 11; Drucker would later serve over 50 years as the principal clarinetist of the New York Philharmonic. In 1945, Russianoff won his audition for the Ballet Russe de Monte-Carlo's orchestra and became its principal clarinetist for two seasons on an extended European tour. During these years he suffered from recurring performance anxiety and left in 1946, later expressing his dislike of the tension he felt. Shortly after leaving the orchestra, Russianoff experienced more performance difficulties while working with the choreographers Martha Graham and Fe Alf; he left after only a week, having severely struggled with the mixed time signatures in Graham's music, and "almost gave up playing from that point on". Russianoff moved more towards teaching: in 1947, he opened a studio at 1595 Broadway that he later shared with the clarinetist Daniel Bonade and the bassoonist Simon Kovar.

Russianoff also performed in Broadway productions from about 1946 to 1950 – he held the self-proclaimed record of "eleven flop shows in a row" during his first year, the only successful show he played for being Song of Norway. Russianoff's anxiety again affected his playing; he admitted that "[the] feeling of getting up and being totally transported and unaware of the audience never came to [him] easily" as a consequence of his low confidence. By studying with Bonade in 1950, Russianoff sought to preserve his performing career. The lessons ended after less than a year because Russianoff and Bonade held incompatible political and philosophical views. (Note: Clark 1983, p. 23, claimed that this was because Bonade had been a collaborationist during the Nazi occupation of France, which Russianoff refuted in Mohler 1984, p. 49, saying he was teaching in New York during this time.) Russianoff resolved to devote himself to teaching, partially due to confidence issues, but also to support his growing family.

In 1955, Russianoff became a faculty member of the Manhattan School of Music, a post he held for 35 years. In the early 1970s, he became a faculty member at the Juilliard School. (Note: The exact date of appointment is in dispute: The New York Times 1990 and McCutchan 1988 quote the year as 1970, while Porter 1990 states it was in 1972.) Along with Michele Zukovsky and Hans-Rudolf Stalder, Russianoff was a contributor to the early International Clarinet Clinics in Denver as a presenter and performer. After appearing at the clinic in 1972, he was invited back to deliver his "rapid-fire energetic monologues" and "Russianoff Hours" at every clinic held in the 1970s. Russianoff enjoyed attending the clinics, describing them as "a place of idealism and inspiration" that encouraged musical and personal growth. At the 1973 clinic, Russianoff helped found the International Clarinet Society, (Note: The International Clarinet Society later merged with ClariNetwork International in 1988 to form the International Clarinet Association.) and was unanimously elected its first vice-president alongside Lee Gibson (editor of The Clarinet, the society's quarterly journal), Robert Schott (secretary-treasurer and librarian), and Ramon Kireilis (president); Russianoff resigned in 1976 because he could not devote the necessary time to the position.

In his late sixties, Russianoff returned from his long hiatus to perform a series of at least seven concerts (including one for the Aeolian Chamber Players). According to Judith Pauley Markovich, a student of Russianoff, his return was mainly due to the support of his wife, who "pinpointed a missing element in Leon's heart [...] that was necessary for him to win against the critical tide of pedantic opinion". Together with Michael Getzin, David Hite, and Allen Sigel, Russianoff later helped found ClariNetwork International c. 1982, the organization that sponsored the international Clar-Fest in the same year. He was featured on WQXR-FM's Great Teachers series in 1981, and continued to lecture and give masterclasses during the 1980s, including at the University of Oklahoma Clarinet Symposiums in 1982 and 1987. He made his final masterclass appearance at the joint conference of ClariNetwork International and the International Clarinet Society in 1988.

As well as the Manhattan School of Music and the Juilliard School, Russianoff taught at Brooklyn College, the Catholic University of America, Queens College, Teachers College, the State University of New York at Purchase, and the music school of 92nd Street Y at some point in his career. He was also contracted to teach the clarinetists of the West Point Band at the United States Military Academy.

== Teaching method ==
=== Early style ===
According to Martin Zwick, a Russianoff student and former principal clarinetist of the Utah Symphony Orchestra, Russianoff's early teaching methods were largely inherited from Bellison's rigid style, and mostly used études by Fritz Kröpsch and a scale book by Carl Baermann. Despite this, Clark states even his early style was "not a Bellison facsimile, but a Russianoff original". Several of Russianoff's students attended lessons together in a masterclass-type configuration. During these lessons, Russianoff played for and alongside his students: in his thesis on Russianoff's Clarinet Method, Anthony Masiello highlights this as unusual for studio teachers of the time, including Bellison.

=== Clarinet Method ===
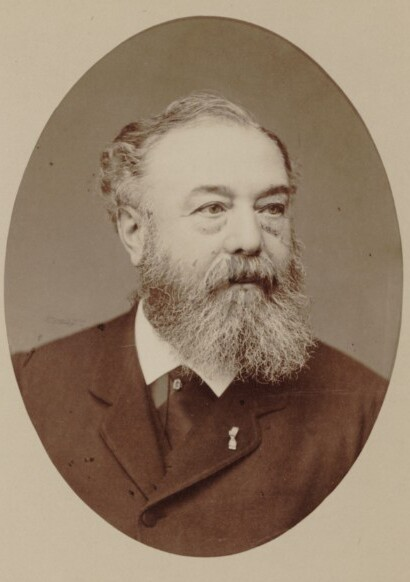
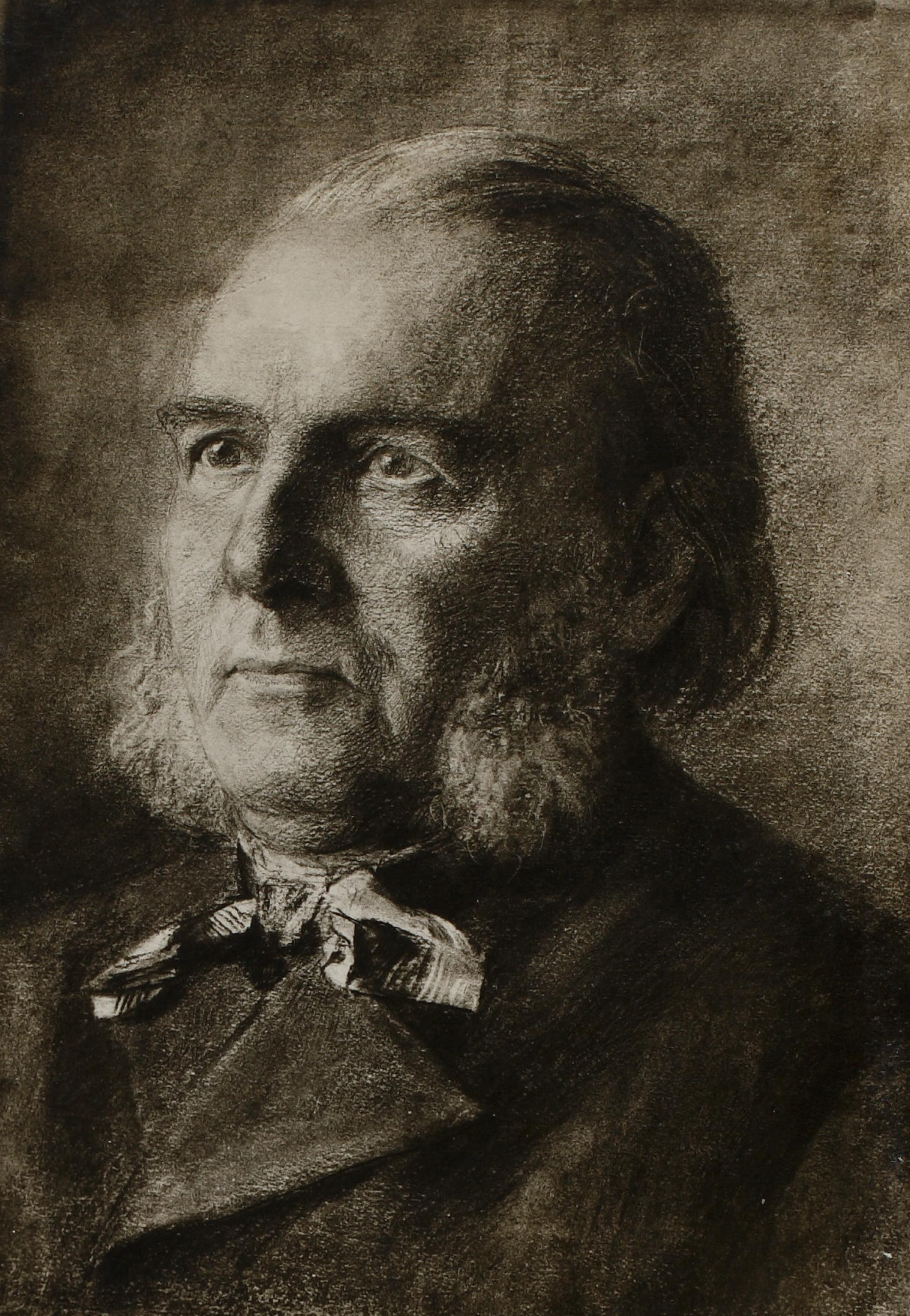
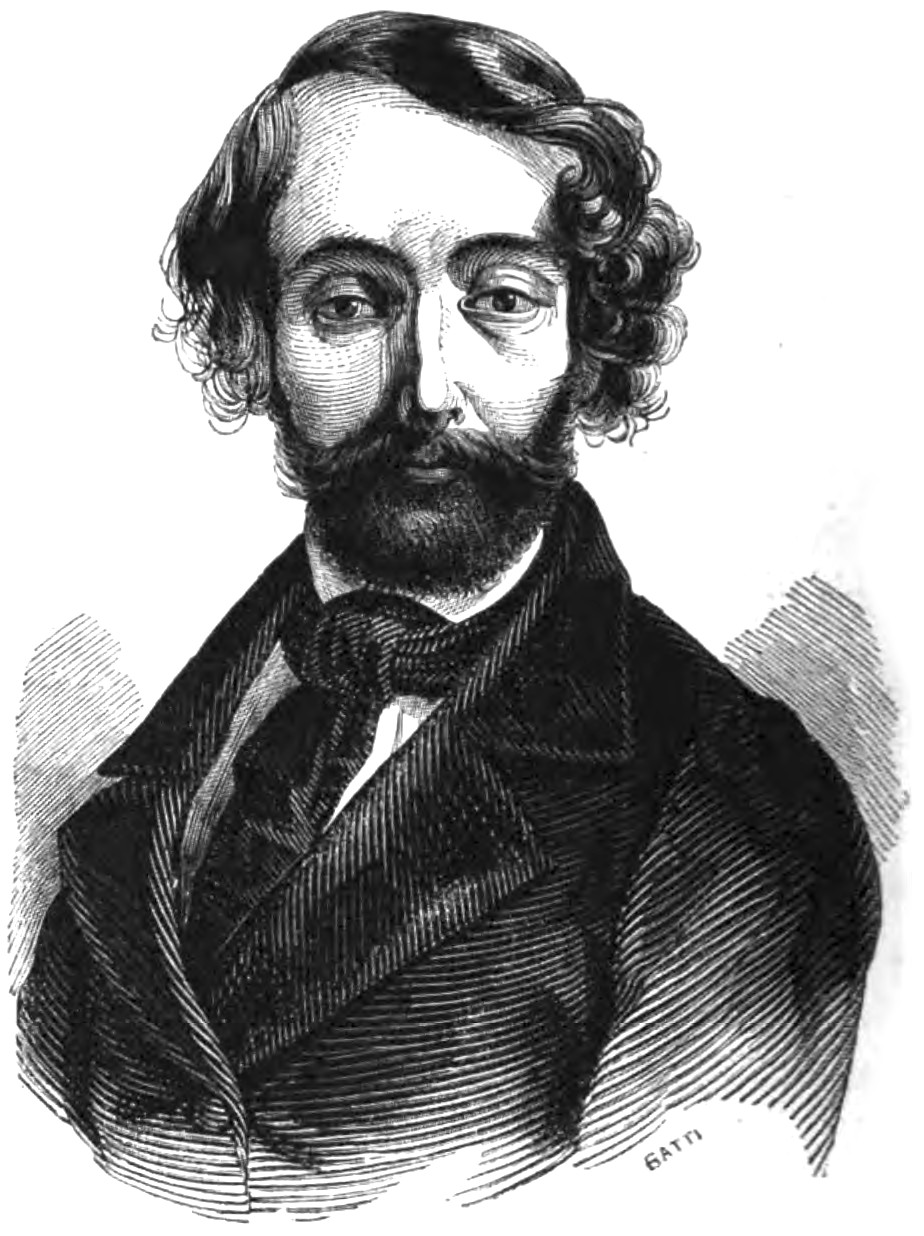
Études by Cyrille Rose, Carl Baermann, Ernesto Cavallini (L–R), and others form the basis of musical examples in Russianoff's Method.

Russianoff's teaching methodology was based on the fundamentals of technique, and was set out in his Clarinet Method, which is out of print as of 2019. Russianoff began drafting and refining the content that would become the Method during the 1960s; according to the former professor of clarinet at the University of Southern Mississippi, Wilbur Moreland, Russianoff would always write down exercises during lessons. He often composed exercises for problems faced by individual students, many of which were later used in the Method under the same names. Moreland notes a similarity between two of Russianoff's studies: the "fulcrum" study of the 1960s and the "pyramid" study. The latter, described by Russianoff as "a tone study consisting of a three-note series played ascending and descending", would be published as part of the Method.

Russianoff started to discuss writing down his teachings more seriously in the 1970s; he started drafting the Method in the same decade, and several students helped by commenting on his writing and converting his exercises into notation. After Russianoff finished writing at the start of the 1980s, the Method was published in 1982 by G. Schirmer, Inc. (see Russianoff 1982).

The Method was designed for use as part of a weekly lesson for more advanced, college-level students; Russianoff himself would use it in many of his lessons after publication. His approach in the Method was to help solve any issues with technique that prevented students from finding their own sound and achieving instinctive musicianship. Standard orchestral, solo, and chamber repertoire from the Western classical tradition is included at the end of each of the method's lessons: it uses existing études (including those by Carl Baermann, Ernesto Cavallini, Cyrille Rose, and Fritz Kröpsch) and orchestral excerpts to teach concepts including dexterity, articulation, and breath control, which he considered to be the most important facets of playing. Russianoff included some of his own études and techniques in the Method to aid learning, including counting a passage aloud, singing passages to "da", actively observing fingerwork, using a sensory "tongue cue" to aid articulation, blowing without playing, and playing with as empty a mind as possible: Clark links these to the "inner game" methodology developed by Timothy Gallwey. Masiello also highlights Russianoff's allusions to Gallwey's concept of duality in "An Open Letter to the Reader" from volume one of the Method, concluding that Gallwey's ideas were influential on Russianoff. Other methods used by Russianoff include the "backswing", "beat-to-beat", and "add-a-note" techniques for fingerwork, and his "pyramid" study for tone.

Reviewing the Method for The Clarinet, Ann McCutchan described it as "a major contribution to the clarinetist's library", and predicted it would become as "dog-eared and marked-up as Hyacinthe Klosé's Méthode complète de clarinette". Writing in The American Music Teacher, Norma V. Disinger praised its affordability and usefulness for both teachers and students.

=== Philosophy and later style ===
According to an obituary in The News-Times, Connecticut, Russianoff was "an unorthodox teacher whose mode of instruction was intuitive and organic"; his lessons were fluid and adaptable, as he disliked teaching iterations of the same material. He regarded teaching and learning as "one and the same art". Russianoff's personal philosophy placed emphasis on individual freedom, and drew from a variety of inspirations, including Gallwey's The Inner Game of Tennis, Albert Ellis' A Guide To Rational Living, Erich Fromm's Escape from Freedom, and the socialist works of Karl Marx, and Friedrich Engels. Simon Kovar particularly influenced his teaching philosophy, as did his second wife, Penelope; in an interview with Lee Gibson, Russianoff stated:

Since I married Penny there has been a profound change in my learning and teaching style as well as in my behavior as a social person [...] Through her inspiration I went, in five years, from feeling like Caspar Milquetoast to Napoleon. The learning and the teaching process starts from and grows with affection. Now I'm more into loving my students. We must enjoy our lessons.

It was Penelope whom Russianoff credited with "start[ing] it all" in the acknowledgments to the Method, noting how "she opened [his] eyes to [his] own value and validity, and gave [him] the insight to find [his] tools for life and teaching: love, honesty, trust, and understanding". Cultivating a good teacher-student relationship based on mutual respect was one of Russianoff's main aims, as he believed that traditional teaching methods quashed his valued attributes of individuality and creativity: Russianoff remarked in 1989 that he was "the most permissive teacher around". Masiello describes Russianoff as an "improvisatory" teacher: his lessons were tailored to each individual student, and aimed to promote confidence through positive reinforcement. Despite playing with his students, he did not ask them to use his playing as a model, nor did he prescribe certain mouthpieces or reeds for all his students; instead, he regarded each student as in charge of their own sound, and provided exercises to help them find it. Students described Russianoff as kind and passionate; writing in The Clarinet, Mary Jungerman contrasted Russianoff's approach with teaching based on "harsh criticism of the student by the teacher". Russianoff regarded printed music as the "biggest enemy a musician has" due to editorializing. Instead of following what was on the page, he suggested students should "rely on [their] musical instincts" to decide "the length, strength, and character of each note they play".

== Personal life and death ==
On August 14, 1940, Russianoff married Alice Kahn. Kahn, who worked on Wall Street for $15 a week, provided Russianoff with the impetus to expand his teaching studio to financially support the marriage. Together they adopted two children: Charlie in 1950 and Sylvia in 1956; shortly after adopting Charlie, they moved from Manhattan to Valley Stream, Long Island. Kahn committed suicide in 1963; Clark reports she had been having an affair with Russianoff's friend and business partner. Russianoff married again on November 2, 1966, this time to Penelope, a psychologist and socialite who was the daughter of Raymond Pearl, a prominent American biologist and statistician. She had previously studied clarinet with Russianoff during the 1960s. At the time of his death, Russianoff owned homes in Manhattan, Sherman, Connecticut, and Truro, Massachusetts.

After a short illness, Russianoff died on September 16, 1990, at the St. Luke's–Roosevelt Hospital Center. His funeral was held privately on September 18 in Manhattan, with music provided by his former pupils Naomi and Stanley Drucker, and a eulogy delivered by Naomi. (Note: Drucker's eulogy was later published in The Clarinet; see Porter 1990, p. 46.) The Druckers were close to Russianoff: he is the namesake of their son, Leon, better known as Lee Rocker (double bassist of The Stray Cats), and the dedicatee of Meyer Kupferman's Double Concerto for Two Clarinets (1991), for which the Druckers arranged the commission. (Note: Russianoff had previously commissioned a work from Kupferman himself, entitled The Magician.)

== Legacy ==
In memory of Russianoff, tribute concerts were held at the Juilliard School on December 3, 1990, the Manhattan School of Music on April 30, 1991, with Charles Neidich as soloist, and on July 19, 1991, at the 1991 Clarinet Fest International, with Paul Green and Steven Klimowski as soloists. The Manhattan School also set up the Leon Russianoff Memorial Scholarship. A two-part obituary featuring testimonials from many of Russianoff's past students was published in The Clarinet (see Porter 1990 and Porter 1991). In 2016, a commemorative concert on the centenary of his birth was organized by some of his former students, featuring performances by David Krakauer, Neidich, Stanley Drucker, and others.

In a 1988 magazine profile for The Instrumentalist, Ann McCutchan described Russianoff as "one of the century's most distinguished, eccentric, and successful music pedagogues", noting near-unanimous praise from his students. Stephen Lee Clark described Russianoff as "one of the most effective and successful clarinet teachers in the world" in his biography. Masiello called him "one of the pivotal teachers of clarinet in the United States during the twentieth century". On the occasion of his death, Joan Waryha Porter remarked in The Clarinet that he was "considered by many to be the Godfather of American clarinetists".

Russianoff's life and work have been the subject of several doctoral theses, including Clark 1983, Masiello 2009, and Monkhouse 1992. He was listed as a "legend" of the International Clarinet Association as part of the 2025 cohort and is recognized as a "clarinet pedagogue legend" by the World Clarinet Alliance. From 1966 to 1998, the clarinet section of the New York Philharmonic was composed entirely of his pupils – namely Stanley Drucker, Peter Simenauer, Steve Freeman, and Michael Burgio.

== Students ==
- Franklin Cohen
- Larry Combs
- Stanley Drucker
- Jimmy Hamilton
- David Krakauer
- Kari Kriikku
- John LaPorta
- Charles Neidich
- Edward Palanker
- Thomas Piercy
- Walt Weiskopf
- Bob Wilber
- Michele Zukovsky

== Writings ==
As well as writing his Method, during the early years of The Clarinet, Russianoff contributed several articles to the fledgling journal in a "series of columns upon clarinet playing and teaching":

- Russianoff, Leon (1982). Clarinet Method. Schirmer Books. ISBN 9780028722306.
- —— (February 1974). "The Reed is Dead: Long Live the Reed" (PDF). The Clarinet. 1 (2): 4–6. ISSN 0361-5553. Archived (PDF) from the original on October 28, 2025.
- —— (August 1974). "Confessions of a Clarinet Teacher" (PDF). The Clarinet. 1 (4): 6–8. ISSN 0361-5553. Archived (PDF) from the original on October 28, 2025.
- —— (May 1976). "I Want You to Play Music and Not to Read It" (PDF). The Clarinet. 3 (3): 10–11. ISSN 0361-5553. Archived (PDF) from the original on October 28, 2025.

== Notes and references ==
=== Sources ===
==== Dissertations and theses ====
- Clark, Stephen Lee (1983). Leon Russianoff: Clarinet Pedagogue (DMA thesis). The University of Oklahoma. OCLC 1053112587. Archived from the original on October 28, 2025.
- Fortune, Stacia (2019). The Progressive Clarinetist: A Comprehensive Method for Fast-Paced Fundamental Growth (DMA thesis). University of Kansas. ISBN 9781392230824. Archived from the original on October 28, 2025.
- Masiello, Anthony (2009). A Study and Analysis of Leon Russianoff's Clarinet Method (DMA thesis). Arizona State University. OCLC 501850573.
- Monkhouse, Heather (1992). Leon Russianoff's Teaching Style (DMA thesis). Manhattan School of Music. OCLC 26392167.

==== Journals ====
- "2025 ICA Honorary Members and Legends" (PDF). The Clarinet. 53 (1): 59–62. December 2025. ISSN 0361-5553. Archived (PDF) from the original on April 29, 2026.
- Barrett, Gregory M. (February–March 1992). "Kuhmo and Time of Music – Two Finnish Summer Music Festivals" (PDF). The Clarinet. 19 (2): 30–33. ISSN 0361-5553. Archived (PDF) from the original on August 21, 2026.
- "Clarinetist Thomas Piercy Receives Sifting Foundation Award" (PDF). The Clarinet. 18 (3): 12. May–June 1991. ISSN 0361-5553. Archived (PDF) from the original on August 21, 2026.
- Clark, Stephen Lee (May–June 1988). "The University of Oklahoma Symposium 1987" (PDF). The Clarinet. 15 (3): 29–30. ISSN 0361-5553. Archived (PDF) from the original on October 28, 2025.
- Disinger, Norma V. (September–October 1985). "Clarinet Method". The American Music Teacher. 35 (1): 42–43. ISSN 0003-0112. JSTOR 43544070.
- Drucker, Stanley (December 2016). "Reflections on Kupferman" (PDF). The Clarinet. 44 (1): 46–47. ISSN 0361-5553. Archived (PDF) from the original on April 29, 2026.
- Estrin, Mitchell (December 2004). "Stanley Drucker" (PDF). The Clarinet. 32 (1): 70–71. ISSN 0361-5553. Archived (PDF) from the original on April 29, 2026.
- Gibson, Lee; Russianoff, Leon (Spring 1978). "The Good Old Days" (PDF). The Clarinet. 5 (3): 8–10. ISSN 0361-5553. Archived (PDF) from the original on October 28, 2025.
- Jungerman, Mary (October 1973). "The International Clarinet Clinic, 1973" (PDF). The Clarinet. 1 (1): 3–7. ISSN 0361-5553. Archived (PDF) from the original on October 28, 2025.
- Kireilis, Ramon J. (February 1974). "The President's Report to the ICS" (PDF). The Clarinet. 1 (2): 2–3. ISSN 0361-5553. Archived (PDF) from the original on October 28, 2025.
- Kireilis, Ramon J. (December 1974). "The International Clarinet Society – After One Year" (PDF). The Clarinet. 2 (1): 3–4. ISSN 0361-5553. Archived (PDF) from the original on October 28, 2025.
- Kireilis, Ramon J. (May 1976). "The State of the Society" (PDF). The Clarinet. 3 (3): 16. ISSN 0361-5553. Archived (PDF) from the original on October 28, 2025.
- Markovich, Judith Pauley (December 2009). "PS: A Heart at Rest" (PDF). The Clarinet. 37 (1): 46–49. ISSN 0361-5553. Archived (PDF) from the original on October 28, 2025.
- McCutchan, Ann (Spring 1983). "Leon Russianoff, Clarinet Method" (PDF). The Clarinet. 10 (3): 30. ISSN 0361-5553. Archived (PDF) from the original on October 28, 2025.
- Mohler, John (Spring 1984). "Book Reviews" (PDF). The Clarinet. 11 (3): 49. ISSN 0361-5553. Archived (PDF) from the original on October 28, 2025.
- Ochsner, Ivan (November–December 1991). "Clarinet Fest 1991" (PDF). The Clarinet. 19 (1): 53–57. ISSN 0361-5553. Archived (PDF) from the original on April 28, 2026.
- Porter, Joan Waryha (November–December 1990). "Leon Russianoff (1916–1990)" (PDF). The Clarinet. 18 (1): 46–49. ISSN 0361-5553. Archived (PDF) from the original on October 28, 2025.
- Porter, Joan Waryha (February–March 1991). "Leon Russianoff (1916–1990): Part II" (PDF). The Clarinet. 18 (2): 42–44. ISSN 0361-5553. Archived (PDF) from the original on October 28, 2025.
- Rose, Bernard (Winter 1983). "The 1982 University of Oklahoma Clarinet Symposium" (PDF). The Clarinet. 10 (2): 30–31. ISSN 0361-5553. Archived (PDF) from the original on October 28, 2025.
- Stanek, Alan (June 2013). "The History of the International Clarinet Association: 1973–2013" (PDF). The Clarinet. 40 (3): 62–72. ISSN 0361-5553. Archived (PDF) from the original on October 28, 2025.
- Wong, Bradley A. (November–December 1988). "The International Clarinet Society 1988 Conference/ClarFest '88" (PDF). The Clarinet. 16 (1): 25–29. ISSN 0361-5553. Archived (PDF) from the original on April 28, 2026.

==== Newspapers ====
- "[Advert]". The New York Times. Vol. 140, no. 48556. March 31, 1991. p. H20. ISSN 0362-4331.
- "City College Will Hold its Commencement Tonight in Lewisohn Stadium". The New York Times. Vol. 87, no. 29369. June 22, 1938. p. 18. ISSN 0362-4331. Archived from the original on October 28, 2025.
- "Further Study is Urged upon Tilden Class". Brooklyn Eagle. Vol. 34, no. 31. February 4, 1933. p. 9. ISSN 2577-9397.
- "Kaufman Named Student President at Samuel Tilden". Brooklyn Eagle. Vol. 91, no. 321. November 19, 1931. p. 11. ISSN 2577-9397.
- "Leon Russianoff, 73, Master Clarinetist". The News-Times. Vol. 107, no. 258. September 18, 1990. p. 14. ISSN 1044-4106.
- "Leon Russianoff, 73, Teacher of Clarinet". The New York Times. Vol. 140, no. 48362. September 18, 1990. p. B10. ISSN 0362-4331. Archived from the original on December 28, 2022.
- "McKelway Jr. H.S. Gives Diplomas to Class of 238". Brooklyn Eagle. Vol. 90, no. 31. February 1, 1930. p. 7. ISSN 2577-9397.

==== Other ====
- Kraus, Lucy (2014). The Glenn Dicterow Collection (Media notes). Philharmonic-Symphony Society of New York.
- "Love Letter to Leon". Allegro. Vol. 116, no. 4. April 2016. ISSN 0002-5704. Archived from the original on May 18, 2025.
- McCutchan, Ann (November 1988). "Leon Russianoff: 50 Years of Teaching". The Instrumentalist. Vol. 43, no. 4. pp. 8–12. ISSN 0020-4331.
- Slonimsky, Nicolas; Kuhn, Laura; McIntire, Dennis, eds. (2001). Baker's Biographical Dictionary of Music and Musicians. New York: Schirmer. ISBN 978-0-02-866091-2. OCLC 712690363.
- "Who We Are". International Clarinet Association. n.d. Archived from the original on October 28, 2025.
- "WKA Artist Recognition". World Clarinet Alliance. n.d. Archived from the original on October 28, 2025.
