= Clarinet choir =

Musical ensemble

Clarinet family French and German System

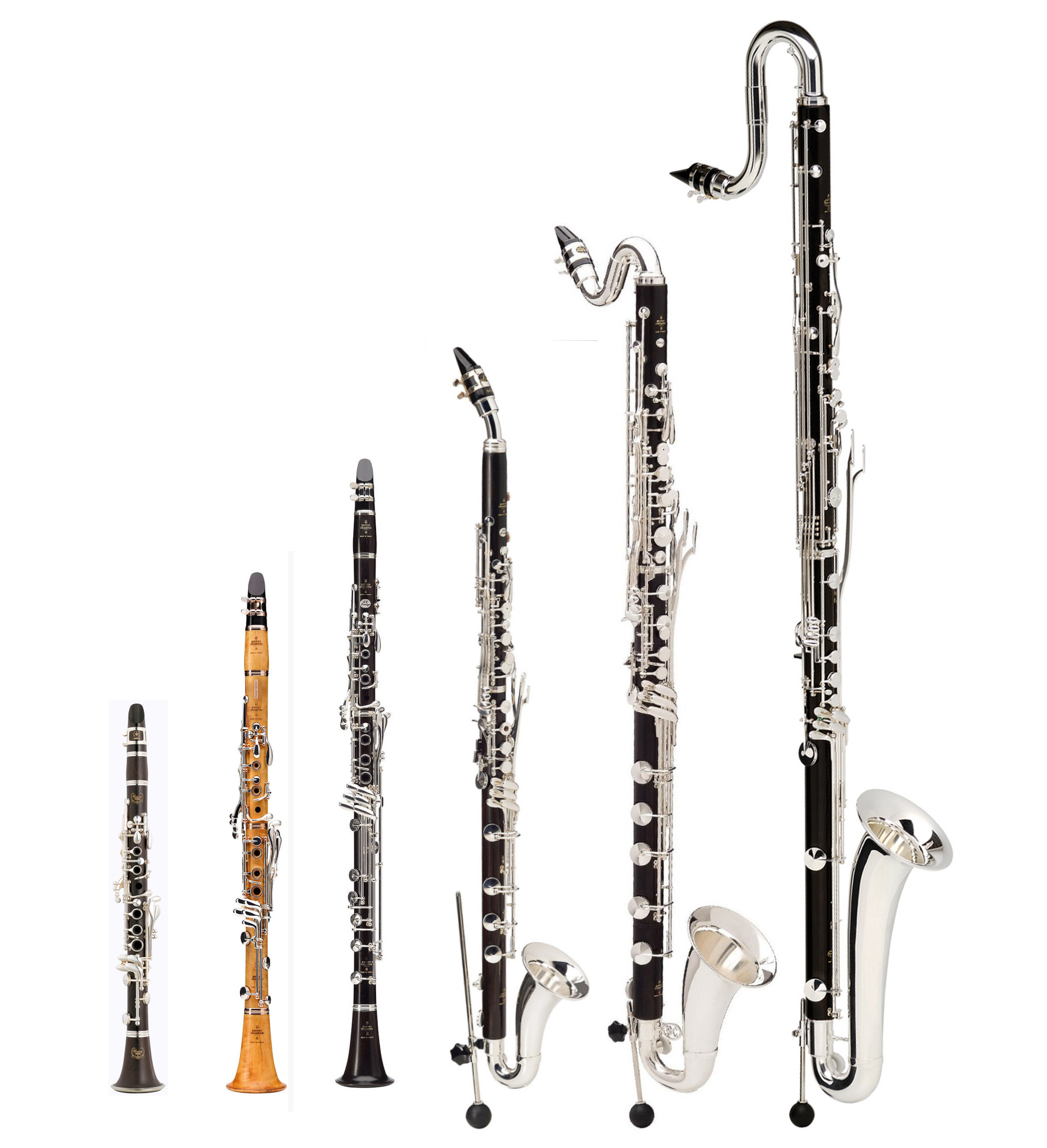
French: clarinets in E♭ and B♭ (boxwood), basset clarinet in A, basset horn, bass clarinet and contralto clarinet

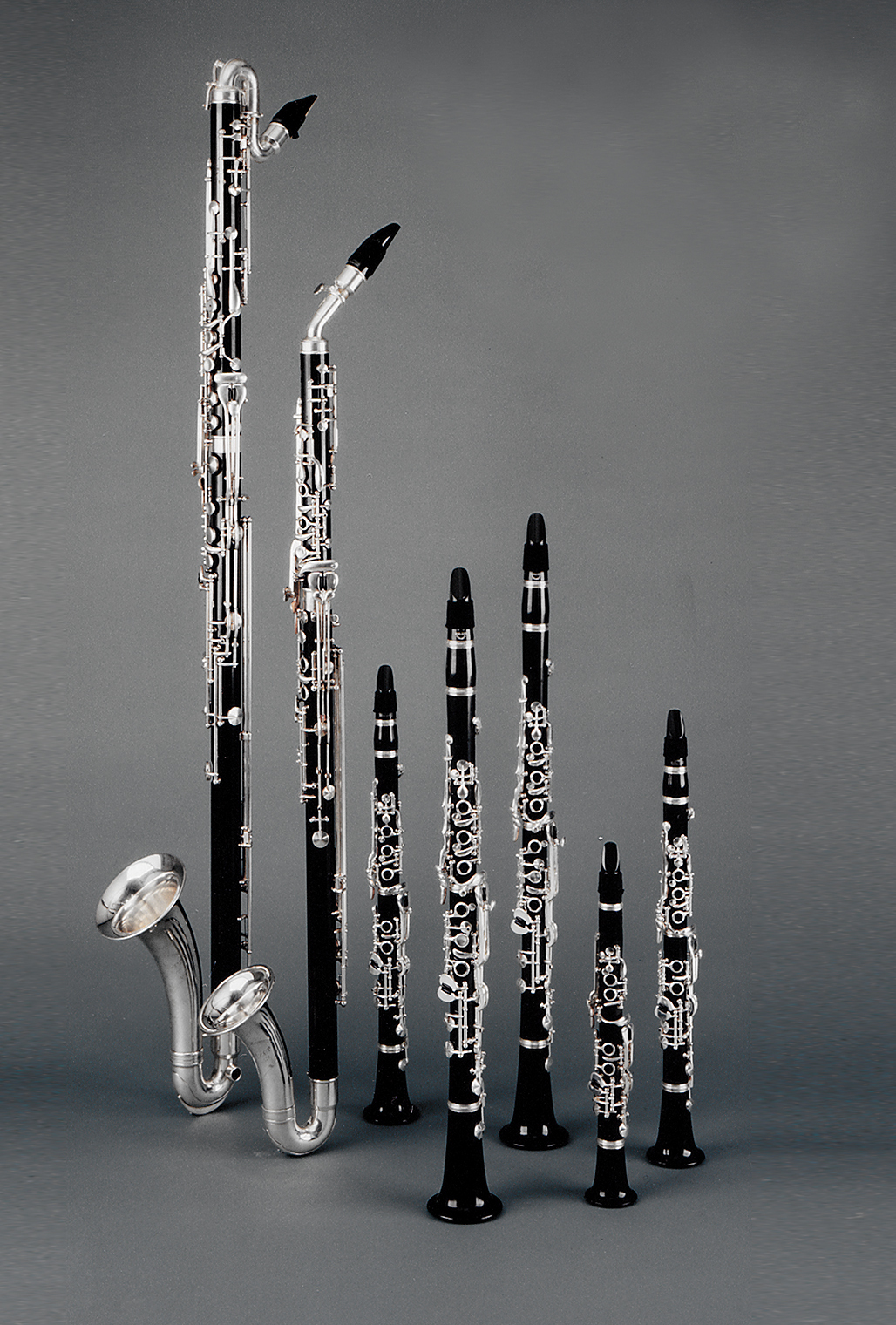
German: bass clarinet, basset horn, clarinets in D, A, B♭, high G and E♭ and a basset clarinet in A

A clarinet choir is a musical ensemble consisting entirely of instruments from the clarinet family. It will typically include E♭, B♭, alto, bass, and contra-alto or contrabass clarinets, although sometimes not all of these are included, and sometimes other varieties may be present. The size of the ensemble varies; it may have between 10 and 40 members. There are also clarinet trios, clarinet quartets, and clarinet quintets, usually consisting of two to four B♭ clarinets and one bass clarinet.

The sound produced by a group of clarinets has been compared to that of a concert organ. Though varying in range, members of the clarinet family have homogenous timbres. Therefore, the clarinet choir may be thought of as a woodwind equivalent to the string orchestra.

== History ==
=== Earlier clarinet ensembles ===
Composers such as Mozart, Stadler, Družecký, and Bouffil anticipated the clarinet choir in their works for three basset horns or clarinets.

James Waterson (1834–1893), a bandmaster to the Viceroy of India with a close association to Henry Lazarus and "The Military School of Music at Kneller Hall", wrote some early clarinet quartets—technically quite difficult works in a popular style—for four B♭ clarinets.

=== The first clarinet choirs ===
Whereas the B♭ clarinet and basset horn (an alto clarinet in F) were readily available from the late 18th century, higher and lower voices were still missing for completion of the choir.

The E♭ clarinet established a niche for itself in the military band, particularly in Germany, from about 1805, whereas the bass clarinet would be perfected by Adolphe Sax in 1838. Therefore, the defining moment with regard to the foundation of the full clarinet choir was the advent of Fontaine-Besson's successful clarinet-pedale design, exhibited in Paris in 1889 and patented in 1891.

Gustave Poncelet (1844–1903) a Belgian clarinetist-saxophonist is credited with creating the first clarinet choir (this ensemble consisted of up to about 27 players) at the Brussels Conservatory in the late nineteenth century while he was teaching there.

It was from hearing Poncelet's ensemble in 1896 that the German composer Richard Strauss became acquainted and enamored with all of the members of the clarinet family. As a result, Strauss used large and diverse clarinet sections in many of his large scale orchestral works and operas.

An early clarinet choir in the United States was established in 1927 by Simeon Bellison, then first clarinetist of the New York Philharmonic; from an initial eight members, the group's size grew by 1948 to 75 members.

=== Rising popularity in the US in the 1950s ===
In the 1950s and 1960s, a number of prominent clarinet performers and educators including James DeJesu, Harold Palmer, Lucien Cailliet, David Hite, Donald McCathren, Alfred Reed, Russell Howland, and Harvey Hermann started a movement that began the golden age of the clarinet choir.

Further stimulation came by music educators who were trying to improve their ever-expanding clarinet sections. Many new compositions and arrangements for the clarinet choir where inspired by this renewed momentum and activity. Most major US university and high school music programs boasted large clarinet choirs. Notable examples were the choirs at the University of Illinois, Iowa State University, Fresno State College, Montana State University, Duquesne University, and Lebanon Valley College.

Strong support for the clarinet choir movement was given by all of the leading instrument manufacturers of the time. Clarinet choirs were often featured at US state, regional, and national music conferences, which often included the formation of conference mass choirs.

== Repertoire ==
The repertoire of music originally composed for clarinet choir was almost nonexistent before the mid twentieth century, but since then transcriptions have been made of many earlier works originally scored for different instrumental groups. Simeon Bellison for one is credited with arranging a vast number of works for clarinet choir in the first half of the twentieth century. Another famous arranger for clarinet choir was Percy Grainger, who spent some weeks during many summers teaching, conducting and performing at the Interlochen Music Camp, near Traverse City, Michigan. In the course of his connection with Interlochen he made several arrangements for homogeneous wind groups, most commonly saxophones or clarinets, of works by J.S. Bach, Josquin des Prez, Jenkins, William Lawes, Le Jeune, and Scarlatti, between 1937 and 1946.

Ensembles such as Harvey Hermann's clarinet choir at the University of Illinois and the University of Florida Clarinet Ensemble, directed by Mitchell Estrin have generated a substantial amount of new repertoire. The center for American Music has a number of recordings of Hermann with his UIUC clarinet choir in its collection. Estrin's group has commissioned many original compositions for the clarinet choir by composers such as Paul Richards, James Paul Sain, and Paul Basler, as well as dozens of new arrangements and transcriptions by Matt Johnston.

== Sources ==
- Abramson, Armand R. "A Better Use of the Clarinet Choir". The Instrumentalist 19 (October 1964): pp. 67–70.
- Ayres, Thomas A. "Clarinet Choir Literature". The Instrumentalist 18 (April 1964): pp. 83–85.
- Bellison, Simeon. The Clarinet Ensemble. New York: Simeon Bellison, 1945.
- Borkowski, Francis. "An Approach to Blending on the Clarinet". The Instrumentalist 18 (January 1964): pp. 85–86.
- Cailliet, Lucien. The Clarinet and Clarinet Choir. Kenosha, Wisconsin: Leblanc Publications, Inc., 1955.
- Cailliet, Lucien. "The Need for Adequate Instrumentation". Music Journal 26 (December 1968): p. 47.
- De Jesu, James. "Improved Clarinet Sections Via Choirs". The Instrumentalist 7 (October 1952): p. 26.
- Heim, Norman. "Clarinet Choir Potpourri". Woodwind World Brass and Percussion 19 (May–June 1980): pp. 14–16.
- Heim, Norman. "The Clarinet Choir". The Instrumentalist 39 (February 1985): pp. 32–35.
- Heim, Norman. "The Clarinet Choir". Woodwind World Brass and Percussion 14 (April 1975): pp. 8–14.
- Heim, Norman. "The Clarinet Choir and Its Emerging Repertoire". Woodwind World Brass and Percussion 16 (November 1977): pp. 6–7.
- Heim, Norman. "The Clarinet Choir Phenomenon". The Instrumentalist 34 (November 1979): pp. 29–33.
- Howland, Russell S. The Clarinet Choir-Its Development and Use. The Instrumentalist 18 (November 1963): p. 78.
- Jennings, Vance. The Clarinet Choir Movement. National Association Of College Wind and Percussion Instructors Bulletin 11:4 (March 1963).
- Jones, Marquis E. Clarinet Choir: An Emerging Art Form. Music Journal 26 (October 1968): pp. 68–71.
- Morgan, John. "The History of the Clarinet Choir". The Instrumentalist 21 (February 1967): pp. 42–43.
- Palanker, Edward S. "The Towson State College Clarinet Choir". Woodwind World Brass and Percussion 14 (April 1975): p. 22.
- Weerts, Richard. "The Clarinet Choir". Journal of Research in Music Education 12:3 (Fall 1964): pp. 227–230.
- Weerts, Richard. "The Clarinet Choir as a Functional Ensemble". The Instrumentalist 23 (March 1969): pp. 55–61.
- Weerts, Richard. "The Clarinet Choir in the Modern Concert Band". Music Journal 23 (December 1965): p. 47.
