= Lucien Cailliet =

French-American composer, conductor and clarinetist (1891–1985)

- Born: May 22, 1891; Dampierre-sur-Moivre, France
- Died: January 3, 1985 (aged 93) Woodland Hills, Los Angeles, California, U.S.
- Genres: Classical music
- Occupations: Composer, conductor, arranger, clarinetist
- Instruments: Clarinet, saxophone

Lucien Cailliet (May 22, 1891 – January 3, 1985) was a French-American composer, conductor, arranger and clarinetist.

== Biography ==
Cailliet was born in 1891 at Dampierre-sur-Moivre, in northern France.

He studied at several French music conservatories, most notably the Conservatory in Dijon, where he graduated at age 22. He also received a degree from the National Conservatory in Paris. He became a bandmaster in the French Army and, in 1915, toured the United States with the French Army Band, including performances at the Panama–Pacific International Exposition.

In 1919 or 1920, Cailliet emigrated to the US and joined the Philadelphia Orchestra, as a clarinetist, saxophonist, and staff arranger, where he worked closely with Leopold Stokowski. Around this time he also founded the Cherry Hill Wind Symphony, which would later become the Wind Symphony of Southern New Jersey. In 1923, at age 32, he became an American citizen, and attended graduate school at the Philadelphia Musical Academy.

Cailliet served as Associate Conductor of The Allentown Band (Pennsylvania) beginning in 1934, during which time he conducted many of his own arrangements. After receiving his Doctor of Music Degree in 1937, he moved to California to teach at the University of Southern California. After seven years there, he decided to devote his time to guest conducting and composing film scores. In the 1950s, he lived in Kenosha, Wisconsin where he worked for the musical instrument producer G. Leblanc Company and conducted the Kenosha Symphony Orchestra.

Lucien Cailliet died at Woodland Hills in 1985, at age 93.

== Compositions and arrangements ==
Cailliet became known for his many faithful arrangements of orchestral music for wind ensemble. His arrangements of Elsa's Procession to the Cathedral (from Wagner's opera Lohengrin) and Finlandia (a symphonic poem by Jean Sibelius) have become staples of the wind ensemble repertory. In 1933, Cailliet performed Reynaldo Hahn's Sarabande et Theme on bass clarinet with Stokowski's Orchestra. In 1937 he made a new arrangement of Modest Mussorgsky's piano suite Pictures at an Exhibition for full orchestra. In 1938, he wrote "Variations on the Theme Pop! Goes the Weasel", a piece that has remained a favorite of bands and orchestras. He also orchestrated Claude Debussy's "Clair de lune" and three piano pieces of Sergei Rachmaninoff: the Serenade, No. 5 from Morceaux de fantaisie Opus 3, the Prelude No. 5 in G minor from the 10 preludes of Opus 23, and the Prelude No. 5 in G major from the 13 preludes of Opus 32. He also made several arrangements for clarinet choir that have become staples of the repertoire.

Cailliet also enjoyed a prolific career creating music for films. He contributed to nearly fifty films as either composer or arranger. Among the best known of these films are She Wore a Yellow Ribbon, The Ten Commandments (for which Elmer Bernstein wrote the score), and Gunfight at the O.K. Corral. His most famous orchestration is the virtuoso piece for piano and orchestra Midnight on the Cliffs by the pianist and composer Leonard Pennario, for the Andrew L. Stone film Julie (1956).

== See also ==
- Cailliet Method - A method for playing the saxophone.
