= Dave Black (composer) =

American composer

Dave Black (born 1959) is an American composer and co-author of numerous books, including Alfred's Drum Method, Alfred's Beginning Drumset Method, Alfred's Kid's Drum Course, Contemporary Brush Techniques, Drumset Independence and Syncopation, Living Praise, Cymals: A Crash Course, The Essential Dictionary of Orchestration, A Jazz Diary, and Sound Innovations for Concert Band. He has also written a number of articles, concert reviews, and book reviews for publications including The Instrumentalist, Down Beat, Modern Percussionist, Modern Drummer, Drums and Drumming, Drum Tracks, Jazz Educators Journal, Grammy Pulse, and Music Connection.

More than 60 of his compositions and arrangements have been published by Alfred Music Publishing, CPP/Belwin, Highland/Etling, Barnhouse, TRN, and Warner Brothers, many of which have been recorded. He has written with, and for the bands of Louie Bellson, Sammy Nestico, Bill Watrous, Bobby Shew, Ed Shaughnessy, Gordon Brisker and the CSUN Jazz Ensemble.

Black has received numerous awards and commissions, including 21 consecutive ASCAP Popular Composer Awards and two Grammy nomination certificate. Many of his compositions have been used as background/source music on TV shows including Good Morning America, Roseanne, Nightline, Grace Under Fire, Ellen, General Hospital, The Drew Carey Show, Coach, and All My Children.

== Books ==
- Sound Innovations for Concert Band (17 books) (Alfred Publishing Co., 2010)
- Living Praise Instrumental Collection (4 books) (Alfred Publishing Co., 2010)
- Essentials of Orchestration (Alfred Publishing Co., 2009)
- Living Praise w/CD/CD-Rom (Alfred Publishing Co., 2007)
- Drumset 101 w/CD (Alfred Publishing Co., 2007)
- Alfred's Kid's Drum Course Complete w/2 CDs (Alfred Publishing Co., 2007)
- Alfred's Kid's Drum Course, Book 2 w/CD (Alfred Publishing Co., 2006)
- Alfred's Kid's Drumset Course w/CD (Alfred Publishing Co., 2005)
- Alfred's Kid's Drum Course, Book 1 w/CD (Alfred Publishing Co., 2004)
- Alfred's Max Drumset Method w/DVD (Alfred Publishing Co., 2004)
- The Drummer's Toolkit w/DVD (Alfred Publishing Co., 2003)
- How to Set Up Your Drumset (Alfred Publishing Co., 2002)
- How to Tune Your Drums (Alfred Publishing Co., 2002)
- Bass Drum Essentials for the Drumset w/CD (Alfred Publishing Co., 2001)
- Essential Dictionary of Orchestration (Alfred Publishing Co., 1999)
- Alfred's Intermediate Snare Drum Solos (Alfred Publishing Co., 1998)
- Alfred's Beginning Snare Drum Solos (Alfred Publishing Co., 1998)
- Drumset Independence & Syncopation (Alfred Publishing Co., 1998)
- A Jazz Diary (Alfred Publishing Co., 1995/96)
- Cymbals: A Crash Course (Alfred Publishing Co., 1992)
- Alfred's Beginning Snare Drum Duets w/CD (Alfred Publishing Co., 1990)
- Alfred's Beginning Drumset Method w/CD (Alfred Publishing Co., 1990)
- Alfred's Drum Method, Book 2 (Alfred Publishing Co., 1988)
- Alfred's Drum Method, Book 1 (Alfred Publishing Co., 1987)
- Contemporary Brush Techniques w/CD (Alfred Publishing Co., 1985/revised 2000)

== DVDs ==
- Alfred’s Kid’s Drumset Course DVD (Alfred Publishing Co., 2009)
- Drumset 101 DVD (Alfred Publishing Co., 2008)
- Alfred's Beginning Drumset Method DVD (Alfred Publishing Co., 2005)
- Alfred's Max Drumset Method DVD (Alfred Publishing Co., 2004)
- The Drummer's Toolkit DVD (Alfred Publishing Co., 2003)
- Alfred's Drum Method DVD, Book 2 (Alfred Publishing Co., 1988)
- Alfred's Drum Method DVD, Book 1 (Alfred Publishing Co., 1987)

== Recordings ==
- Sunset on Sunset, Mary Yandall (Festival Records CD-30187): featuring Jerry Hey, Gary Grant, Bill Reichenbach, Dan Higgins and Charlie Loper (1990)
- In A Mellow Tone, Anita O' Day (DRG Records CDSL-5209): featuring Frankie Capp and Pete Jolly (1989); 1989 Grammy nominee
- New Beginning, The Gordon Brisker Big Band (Discovery Records DS-938): featuring Victor Lewis, Steve Huffsteter, Rick Culver and Kim Richmond (1987)

== Commercially Recorded Compositions ==
- In Roy's Corner, "Airmail Special," The Louie Bellson Big Band (MusicMasters Records); 1990 Grammy nominee
- Peaceful Thunder, "Peaceful Thunder," The Louie Bellson Big Band (MusicMasters Records); 1992
- Brush Strokes, "Peaceful Thunder," The Louie Bellson Big Band (MusicMasters Records); 1992

== Compositions ==
Jazz Ensemble

- Gone, but Not Forgotten (Warner Brothers Publications, 1995)
- Off the Back Burner (Warner Brothers Publications, 1995)
- A Latin Affair (CPP/Belwin, Inc., 1994)
- Two-Way Split (CPP/Belwin, Inc., 1993)
- Mucho Gusto (CPP/Belwin, Inc., 1993)
- Peaceful Thunder (CPP/Belwin, Inc., 1992)
- Brush Strokes (Barnhouse Publishing Co., 1992)
- Just A Thought of You (Barnhouse Publishing Co., 1991)
- Basically Bossa (Barnhouse Publishing Co., 1991)
- Love Is Not Forgotten (CPP/Belwin, Inc., 1990)
- In Roy 's Corner (Barnhouse Publishing Co., 1990)
- The Untitled Waltz (Barnhouse Publishing Co., 1990)
- The Singin' Samba (Barnhouse Publishing Co., 1989)
- The Time Is Right (Barnhouse Publishing Co., 1988)
- Crystals (Barnhouse Publishing Co., 1988)
- Smooth Touch (Barnhouse Publishing Co., 1988)
- Casanova Bossa Nova (Barnhouse Publishing Co., 1987)
- Swing It Like Ya Mean It (Barnhouse Publishing Co., 1987)
- Sojourn (Barnhouse Publishing Co., 1986)
- Tuned Out (Barnhouse Publishing Co., 1985)
- Joe (TRN Publishing Co., 1984)
- La Tierra (TRN Publishing Co., 1984)
- Nick (Alfred Publishing Co., 1981)

Compositions for Concert Band

- Two Russian Sketches (Alfred Publishing Co., 2005)
- A Westward Expedition (Commissioned) (Alfred Publishing Co., 2004)
- Scarborough Fair (Alfred Publishing Co., 2002)
- Sketches of Spain (Commissioned) (Alfred Publishing Co., 2002)
- It Came Upon the Midnight Clear (Alfred Publishing Co., 2001)
- A Bayside Trilogy (Commissioned) (Alfred Publishing Co., 2001)
- Echoes of Christmas (Alfred Publishing Co., 2000)
- Two Irish Sketches (Alfred Publishing Co., 2000)
- Lindbergh's Triumph (Alfred Publishing Co., 2000)
- With Boughs of Holly (Alfred Publishing Co., 1999)
- Two River Classics (Alfred Publishing Co., 1998)
- Columbia Vision (Commissioned) (Alfred Publishing Co., 1998)
- Loch Lomond (Alfred Publishing Co., 1997)
- Star Quest (Commissioned) (Alfred Publishing Co., 1997)
- Two Christmas Miniatures (Alfred Publishing Co., 1997)
- Greensleeves (Alfred Publishing Co., 1996)
- The Emerald Isle (Alfred Publishing Co., 1996)
- Cordoba (Alfred Publishing Co., 1995)
- A Christmas Scrapbook (Alfred Publishing Co., 1995)
- Old Santa Fe (Alfred Publishing Co., 1994)
- March of the Eternal Flame (Alfred Publishing Co., 1994)
- March of the Americas (Alfred Publishing Co., 1993)

Compositions for String Orchestra

- Silent Night (Highland/Etling Publishing Co., a division of Alfred Publishing Co., 1996)
- It Came Upon the Midnight Clear (Highland/Etling Publishing Co., a division of Alfred Publishing Co., 1995)
- Shenandoah (Highland/Etling Publishing Co., a division of Alfred Publishing Co., 1994)
- A Romantic Interlude (Highland/Etling Publishing Co., a division of Alfred Publishing Co., 1993)
- The Banks of Bonnie Doon (Highland/Etling Publishing Co., a division of Alfred Publishing Co., 2009)

Compositions for Snare Drum

- Final Rudimental Solo (Alfred Publishing Co., 2003) -Featured in the 20th Century Fox movie/DVD “Drumline”

Compositions for Piano

- So Far from Tears (Alfred Publishing Co., 1996)
- Soft-Shoe Dixie (Alfred Alfred Publishing Co., 1995)

Compositions for Church Choral

- Worship the King, Our God - SATB/SAB (Alfred Publishing Co., 2008)
- Walkin' in the Light (I Want to Walk as a Child of the Light) - SATB/2-Part (Alfred Publishing Co., 2007)

== Articles ==
- In Memoriam - Sandy Feldstein, by Dave Black (Percussion News, November 2007)
- My Views on Music Education, by Dave Black (The Instrumentalist, April 2007)
- An Interview with Dave Black, by Ray Deegan (Drum Scene, Issue 21, March–May 2001)
- An Interview with Percussionist/Composer Dave Black, by David Roffe (The Australian Music Teacher, Vol. 7, December 1999)
- Of Musicians and Percussionists - An Interview with Dave Black, by Catherine Sell Lenzini (The Instrumentalist, September 1996)
- Unusual Cymbal Effects, by Dave Black & Mitch Peters (The Instrumentalist, June 1995)
- Percussion Today - Michael “Kalani” Bruno, by Dave Black (Modern Drummer, December 1993)
- An Interview with Sammy Nestico, by Dave Black (Jazz Educators Journal, Summer 1993)
- Cymbal Seminar, by Dave Black & Mitch Peters (The Instrumentalist, April 1993)
- Portraits - Dave Black, Host of This Year's PASIC and Much More, by Robyn Flans (Modern Drummer, November 1991)
- M' Boom - Redefining The Roles of Rhythm, by Dave Black (Drums & Drumming, June/July 1990)
- Up & Coming - David Tull, by Dave Black (Modern Drummer, April 1990)
- Drumming in Music City U.S.A., by Dave Black (Downbeat, February 1990)
- The Drummer as a Musical Director, by Dave Black (Drum Tracks, Vol. 7, #1, 1990)
- A Tribute to Buddy Rich from Louie Bellson, by Dave Black (Drum Tracks, Vol. 5, # 2)
- Spotlight - Steve Schaeffer, by Dave Black (Drum Tracks, Vol. 6, #2, 1989)
- An Interview with Danny Seraphine, by Dave Black * (Percussive Notes, Vol. 27, # 1, Fall 1988)
- An Interview with Louie Bellson, by Dave Black (Percussive Notes, Vol. 25, # 5, Summer 1987)
- Ed Shaughnessy - An Energy Force Reflects on His Life and Music, by Dave Black (Jazz Educators Journal, February/March 1987)
- Doing It Her Way - Karen Ervin Pershing, by Dave Black (Modern Percussionist, Dec. 1985 - Feb. 1986)
- Teachers: Part 2 - Joel Leach, by Dave Black (Modern Drummer, November 1984)
- Is It Live or Is It a Drum Machine?, by Dave Black (The Instrumentalist, June 1984)
- Jazzing It Up on the High Seas, by Dave Black (The Instrumentalist, April 1984)

== External Pages ==
- Dave Black Music
- Alfred Music Publishing
