= Sergiu Shapira =

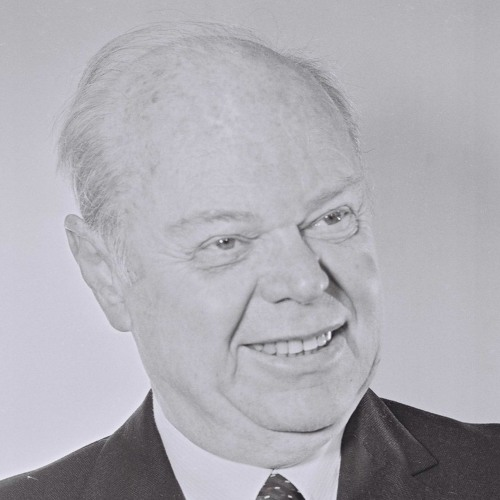
Sergiu Shapira

Sergiu Shapira (Hebrew: סרג'יו שפירא; born 25 July 1931, Negru Vodă, Constanța) is an Israeli composer, educator, and musicologist. His works include orchestral, chamber, instrumental and vocal music. His music was performed, recorded and published in various countries, such as the U.S., the United Kingdom, France, Germany, Belgium, Italy, Canada, Japan, Taiwan, South Africa, Georgia, Romania, Israel, and others. Shapira was awarded many prizes and awards, including the first prize of the International Clarinet Association. His works were selected to represent the state of Israel in numerous international music festivals and were performed in venues such as Carnegie Hall, Lincoln Center and other major stages around the world.

== Life ==
Shapira was born in Romania on 25 July 1931. His father, an attorney at law, was an avid amateur musician, playing violin and piano. Shapira began his music education at a very early age, studying piano. At the age of 15, he discovered composition and was immediately drawn to it. After graduating high school, he was accepted to the National University of Music Bucharest, majoring in composition and piano. There he studied with renowned composer and educator, Leon Klepper, a disciple of Joseph Marx and Paul Dukas. He also studied under the supervision of Marţian Negrea, a disciple of George Enescu. In 1956, after graduating with a master's degree in composition, Shapira married pianist Shulamith Fellner, a student of Florica Musicescu. Soon after, they emigrated to Israel, where he joined the faculty at the Jerusalem Academy of Music and Dance.

After the birth of his two children (in 1965 and in 1967), Shapira began to take an interest in music education. While maintaining his activity as a composer, He also wrote several didactic compositions, meant for the use and enjoyment of his young children. His interest in music education grew as the years past by, and he began to research it as well, concentrating on the educational features of didactic piano music. His doctoral thesis was titled "Educational Art Music in Israel - Preservation of Stylistic Elements within the Framework of Pedagogical Constraints".

== Prizes, awards, and festivals ==
- Romanian Compesers' League special award (1956) (Sonatina for piano)
- First prize of the International Clarinet Association(1999) (A Talk with the Unseen for clarinet solo)
- "Music Festival Brussels" (2005) (Sonata for cello solo)
- "Asian Pacific Festival", Wellington (2007) ( Fancies for bassoon and piano)
- "International Music Festival", Beverly Hills, California, U.S. (2010) (Two Movements for cello and piano)
- "International Festival Contemporanea", Bucharest, Romania (2010) (A Talk with the Unseen for clarinet solo)
- "Music Festival Fou de Basson", Angoulem, France (2010) (Woodwind Quartet)
- "29th Asian Composers' League Conference and Festival", Tape, Taiwan (2011) (Sonata for cello solo)
- "Asian Music Festival", Tokyo, Japan (2017) (Prayer for clarinet solo)

== Compositional style ==
Despite the selective adoption of various elements of contemporary music, Shapira's style cannot be identified with any stream, school, or technique of the 20th century. His music maintains a freedom of expression that excludes any stylistic and technical limitations imposed by a predetermined system of composition. Shapira's musical language reflects the development of conceptual approaches, from modality, through expended tonality, to atonality.

== Compositions ==
=== Piano compositions ===
- Sonatina (1955)
- Tryptyich (1957)
- Rondo Burlesco (1961)
- Little Suite (1961)
- Four Short Pieces (1972)
- A Magic World for piano (1985)
- Feelings (1988)
- Garland: piano pieces in popular style (1990)

=== Instrumental music ===
- Pastels for flute and piano (1982)
- A Talk With the Unseen for clarinet solo (1986)
- Biblical Scenes for harp (1987)
- Expressions for oboe solo (1989)
- Sonata in one movement for cello solo (1991)
- Fancies for bassoon and piano (1999)
- Prayer for clarinet solo (2008)
- Four Character Pieces for bassoon solo (2010)
- Divertimento for two flutes (2010)
- Glimpses of an Anniversary for two trumpets (2012)
- Three Romances for contrabass and piano (2013)
- Air and Humoresque for flute solo (2014)

=== Chamber music ===
- Two Movements for cello and piano (1983)
- Tandu for violin and cello (2002)
- String Quartet (1955)
- Woodwind Quartet: for flute, oboe, clarinet and bassoon (2004)

=== Orchestral music ===
- Diptych for string orchestra (1991)
- Remembrance for cello and orchestra (1994)
- Night on the Old Town - Symphonic Pictures (1996)

=== Vocal music ===
- Rachel's Poem for soprano voice and piano (1986)
- Diaspora Songs for choir (1971)
- Five Hebrew Songs for choir (1967)
- Heritage Songs for choir (1972)
- Bring us Water for children's choir and piano (1973)

=== Educational music ===
- Memories From Childhood, book I, II for piano (1966)
- From the Child's World, book I, II for piano (1979)
- On the Fiddle for violin and piano (1981)
- Sunny Day for children's voice and piano (1977)
- Garden Flowers four children songs (1977)

== Publications ==
- Shapira, S. (Spring 1991) "My Piano Works". Opus, issue 5. pp. 54–58
- Shapira, S. (Spring 1992) "Didactic Art Music for Piano". Opus, issue 7. pp. 20–32
- Shapira, S. (Spring 1993) "Did J.S. Bach Write the Musette from Anna Magdalene's Second Book?".Opus, issue 9. pp.
- Shapira, S. "Educational Art Music in Israel - Preservation of Stylistic Elements within the Framework of Pedagogical Constraints". (Doctoral dissertation).
- Shapira, S. "My Views on Composition". Music in Time. Smoira-Cohn, M. Jerusalem Academy of Music and Dance: Jerusalem. (2005). pp. 81–86
