= Russianoff =

Russianoff is a surname. Notable people with the surname include:

- Gene Russianoff (fl. 1978), American spokesman
- Leon Russianoff (1916–1990), American clarinetist
