= Cailliet method =

Method of learning the saxophone

The Cailliet Method is a method of learning the saxophone originally devised by French-born American composer Lucien Cailliet, which he described in the two published volumes named "Cailliet Method for Saxophone". The method itself focuses on the inclusion of Music Theory in order to accentuate the role of harmonies, counterpoints and orchestration, to evoke appreciation from the musician on their importance within music, without departing too much from the sake of instrumental training.

The emphasis within the Cailliet method is based upon the belief that "one should know a subject completely before specializing in any part of it". The method itself encompasses traditional methods such as scales and arpeggios with various additional articulations for the purpose of increasing proficiency, but also involves the study of various other forms of musical notation and concept. Amongst these additional studies is the diminished seventh, which Cailliet described as vague, unexplained and even mysterious to trained musicians.

The other focuses, as described by the second volume of the method are:

- Scales and arpeggios (with several alternate articulations)
  - Major and minor scales, proceeding in thirds
  - Arpeggios on dominant 7th chords
  - Arpeggios on diminished sevenths
- Intervals
  - Chromatic intervals
  - Articulation and intervals
- Expression
  - Melodic expression
  - Rhythmic expression
  - Harmonic expression
- "Artifices of composition"
  - Canonic imitation
  - Fugue and Canon
