= Heinrich Grenser =

German musical instrument maker (1764–1813)

Johann Heinrich Wilhelm Grenser (5 March 1764 – 12 December 1813) was a German musical instrument maker.

From 1779 to 1786 he was apprenticed to his uncle, August Grenser, a Dresden instrument maker, and after his apprenticeship he continued to work in August's shop, taking it over himself in 1796. Heinrich Grenser invented an early form of bass clarinet in 1793, and may have been the inventor of the alto clarinet, beginning production in 1808.

Grenser died in Dresden in 1813. A 1978 inventory lists 127 surviving instruments by Grenser, most of them bassoons and flutes, but also including basset horns, clarinets, oboes, fagottini, and one each of bass clarinet, cor anglais, oboe d'amore, bass horn, contrabassoon, hunting horn, and recorder.
