= Edward Palanker =

American musician

Edward Palanker is an American clarinetist and university professor.

== Education ==
Palanker graduated from The Manhattan School of Music in 1962. He also attended the Mannes College of Music. His principal clarinet teachers where Leon Russianoff and Eric Simon and he studied bass clarinet with Joe Allard. Other instructors included Earl Bates, Robert Marcellus, Anthony Gigliotti and Bernard Portnoy.

== Performance career ==
Palanker performed in over two hundred concerts as the Principal Clarinetist of The Eastern Music Festival Philharmonic in Greensboro, North Carolina for 25 years, where he also performed all of the standard clarinet concertos and chamber music repertoire. He was the clarinetist and bass clarinetist with the Baltimore Symphony Orchestra Retired in 2014. He also performed regularly on the Music by Candlelight Series, the BSO Chamber Music series, and was the principal clarinetist with the Choral Arts Society of Baltimore. Previously, he was a member of the Atlantic Symphony Orchestra in Halifax, Nova Scotia, The Kinhaven Music Festival in Vermont, and The Theater Chamber Players in Washington, D.C. Mr. Palanker has recorded the complete solo clarinet works of Theldon Myers as well as other solo and ensemble music in the 70s and 80s. He has performed on many of the BSO recordings.

== Teaching career ==
From 1967 to 2000 Palanker taught at Towson University, where he was in charge of the clarinet department, woodwind ensembles and director of the Towson Chamber Players. Upon his retirement, he was awarded the honor of Professor Emeritus for his outstanding service to the music department and the University.

From 1992 to 2010 he was also on the faculty of The Peabody Conservatory of Music, where he performed regularly on the chamber music series.

He also taught at several music festivals.

As a member of The Towson Fine Arts Wind Quintet, he performed concerts and master classes at the St. Petersburg Conservatory in Russia. He also presented a master class at the Manhattan School of Music as part of its “Visiting Orchestra Series,” performances and classes at ClarinetFests at Ohio University and University of Maryland, and the Oklahoma Symposium.

Many of his former students are performing in major orchestras and military bands throughout the United States, including the Philadelphia Orchestra.

== Publications ==
Mr. Palanker is also a frequent guest writer for The Clarinet Journal, published by the International Clarinet Association.

== Affiliations ==
Palanker is a Selmer bass clarinet-performing artist and a Rico Grand Concert Reed artist.
