= Alto clarinet =

Musical instrument of the clarinet family

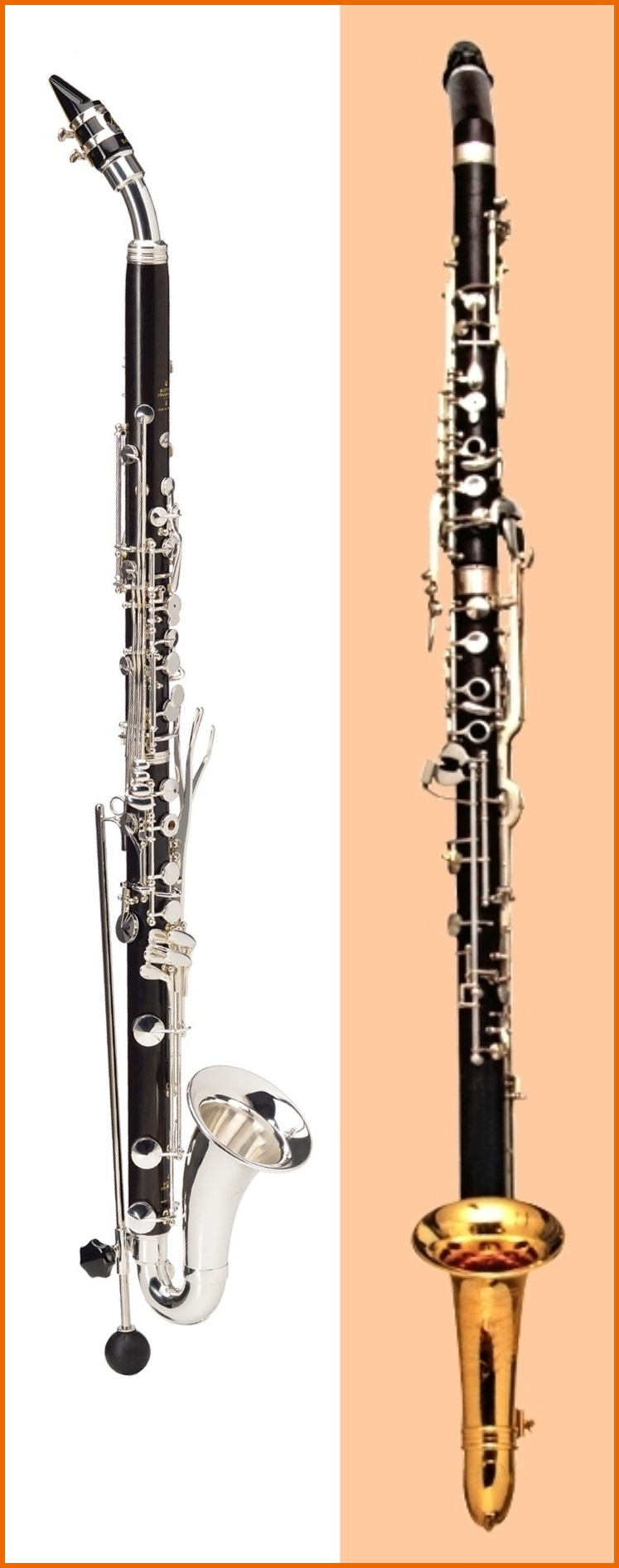
- Alto clarinet BC to low Eb (Boehm system) and Dietz to low C (German system)
- Classification: Wind; Woodwind; Single-reed

Playing range
- Written: E♭_{3} to G_{6}; Sounding: G♭_{2} to B♭_{5}

Related instruments
- Clarinet; Clarinet d'amore; Basset horn; Bass clarinet; Contra-alto clarinet

The alto clarinet is a woodwind instrument of the clarinet family. It is a transposing instrument pitched in the key of E♭, though instruments in F have been made. In size it lies between the soprano clarinet and the bass clarinet. It bears a greater resemblance to the bass clarinet in that it typically has a straight body (made of grenadilla or other wood, hard rubber, or plastic), but a curved neck and bell made of metal. All-metal alto clarinets also exist. In appearance it strongly resembles the basset horn, but usually differs in three respects: it is pitched a whole step lower, it lacks an extended lower range, and it has a wider bore than many basset horns.

The sounding range of the alto clarinet is from the concert G_{2} or G♭_{2} (in the second octave below middle C, bottom line of the bass clef) to B♭_{5} (in the second octave above middle C), with the exact upper end of the range depending on the skill of the player. Despite the broad range, the instrument is always scored in the treble clef. The alto clarinet sounds a major sixth lower than written. (In F, it sounds a perfect fifth lower than written).

Most modern alto clarinets, like other instruments in the clarinet family, have the Boehm system or Oehler system of keys and fingering, which means that this clarinet has virtually identical fingering to the others. The alto clarinet, however, often has an extra key allowing it to play a low (written) E♭, and a half-hole key controlled by the left-hand index finger with a vent that may be uncovered to assist in playing the altissimo register.

== History ==
The invention of the alto clarinet has been attributed to Iwan Müller and to Heinrich Grenser, and to both working together. Müller was performing on an alto clarinet in F by 1809, one with sixteen keys at a time when soprano clarinets generally had no more than 10–12 keys; Müller's revolutionary thirteen-key soprano clarinet was developed soon after. The alto clarinet may have been invented independently in America; the Metropolitan Museum of Art has a bassoon-shaped alto clarinet in E♭, cataloged as an "alto clarion", attributed to an anonymous American maker circa 1820. This instrument bears a strong resemblance to the "patent clarions" (bass clarinets) made from about 1810 by George Catlin of Hartford, Connecticut and his apprentices. Later, in Europe, Adolphe Sax made notable improvements to the alto clarinet.

Albert Rice defines clarinets in G with flared bells, which were produced as early as 1740, as alto clarinets, but this use of the term is uncommon.

== Use in musical ensembles ==
Soon after its invention, Georg Abraham Schneider composed two concertos (Op. 90 and op. 105) for Müller's instrument and orchestra. Generally, however, the alto clarinet has not been commonly used in orchestral scoring. It is used mostly in concert bands and plays an important role in clarinet choirs. A few jazz musicians, Hamiet Bluiett, Vinny Golia, J. D. Parran, Petr Kroutil, Joe Lovano and Gianluigi Trovesi among them, have played the alto clarinet. Trovesi particularly favors the instrument, and has featured it on several of his albums. Hector Berlioz describes it as "[a] very beautiful instrument which ought to take its place in all well-established orchestras.", while Charles Koechlin describes it as "like the basset horn, a very beautiful instrument" with a "legitimate place [in] a Clarinet Quartet, where it will have the same role as a viola in a string quartet"

=== Notability ===
The alto clarinet band part remains in 20th and 21st century wind band literature. Band directors looking to add color to a large clarinet section will often move clarinet players to this instrument. Many times the alto clarinet serves an important role in the harmonic scoring of the clarinet section within the broader scope of the concert band.

There is a notable alto clarinet solo in Percy Grainger's wind-band piece Lincolnshire Posy.

An important orchestral example is Igor Stravinsky's Threni, which calls for an instrument in F instead of the usual E♭, and with extension keys to fingered low C (therefore indistinguishable from a basset horn). Stravinsky calls for the usual alto clarinet in E♭ in the Elegy for J.F.K. (1964).

Joseph Holbrooke seems to have liked the instrument. He wrote an elaborate part for alto clarinet in his Symphony No. 2 Apollo and the Seaman.

Some contemporary composers have written full concertos for the instrument, such as Argentinian composer Fabricio Gatta's Concerto for Alto Clarinet and Orchestra (2024).

In the wind band and clarinet choir the alto clarinet can add tonal strength to the ensemble, not only because it can play lower notes, but because some of the most beautiful notes (written C to F) in the upper register of the alto clarinet have the same pitch as the weaker-toned middle-register notes (written F to B♭) of the B♭ soprano clarinet.

=== Ensemble music ===
The alto clarinet fell somewhat out of favor outside of marching bands, during the late 19th and early 20th centuries. It has become mildly more popular with contemporary composers, and especially those writing music for clarinet choir.

=== Solo music for alto clarinet ===
The solo repertoire for alto clarinet is quite limited, with much of it consisting of transcriptions of works originally for basset horn. A number of compositions originally conceived for alto clarinet and piano include Franklin Stover's Pastorale & Passepied (with alternate part for basset horn in F), Frank McCartey's Sonata, David Bennett's Dark Wood, William Presser's Arietta, Alfred Reed's Serenata and Sarabande, and a Sonata by Norman Heim. Karlheinz Stockhausen has also composed for the alto clarinet and basset horn.

=== Differences in nomenclature ===
In contrast with more recent families of instruments such as for example the saxophone, the terms used for the different sized clarinets draw more on tradition and regionalism, and are not without discrepancies. The familiar B♭ and A clarinets, while technically soprano instruments, are not commonly referred to as such outside of academic circles. There is no "tenor" clarinet as such, and while the term "bass clarinet" seems clear enough, its relation to the alto clarinet really places it in the position of the tenor instrument of the clarinet family. Some writers have considered that the alto clarinet might be better referred to as a "tenor". Add to this the fact that the contrabass clarinet in E♭, though pitched below the bass clarinet, is sometimes referred to as a "contralto clarinet", there is ample ground for confusion in clarinet nomenclature.

Considering the wide range of the clarinet (more than three octaves) and focussing on the first two octaves, this would compare better with the classifications given, for example, to the saxophone family. The "soprano" clarinets in B♭ and A share their lowest octaves with the alto saxophone (minus a semitone in the case of the B♭ clarinet). In the case of the E♭ alto, the range usually extends to a tone below that of the tenor saxophone. It is clear that the "soprano" clarinets in B♭, A, and C are perfectly capable of taking on the higher lines in a score, but they achieve this by playing largely in their "clarion" and "altissimo" registers. The lower instruments are, for obvious reasons, exploited much more in their "chalumeau" registers and this, by comparison, is quite low. Also, since the time of Mozart and the clarinettist Anton Stadler, composers began to favour the rich sonorities of the lower tessitura of the clarinet and this may partly have contributed to the clarinet family being pitched further down against its counterparts in the wind section of the orchestra where it will often take on the lower parts.

=== Alto clarinet parts in wind bands ===
In the late 1940s, there was some discussion over whether the alto clarinet should be eliminated from the standard wind band. Arguments for its removal include its relatively low volume, the superiority of a then-recent (but never mass-produced) prototype in the key of F, and that its part is often doubled by other instruments. (Note: Since then, Alto Clarinets have become substantially more affordable, with used student models such as the Bundy 1425 and the Vito 7165 often sold used for less than the cost of a new Soprano Clarinet. Additionally, improvements in mouthpieces have helped greatly to address the volume concerns of the 1940s, although having two Alto Clarinet players (as opposed to only one player) on the part will undoubtedly be a more impactful way to address this problem) Arguments against its removal included its unique tone colour, its role in creating a complete clarinet family, the difficulties its removal would cause in later performing older works, the public funds already spent on obtaining alto clarinets for many groups, and the fact that many bands could improve their alto clarinet section by increasing the size of the section and asking stronger players to play it. This discourse caused the instrument's popularity to decline, meaning that much music published from the 1970s onwards does not include an alto clarinet part (especially pieces written for developing ensembles). However, mature bands utilizing more sophisticated arrangements quite often have a seat dedicated to alto clarinet, so in the majority of American high school and college bands, a complete family of clarinets is encountered in the modern wind band.

The alto clarinet is an integral part of the clarinet choir, where it often doubles the melody in octaves, and is often used as a middle solo voice between the treble and bass voices.
