= Gustave Poncelet =

Belgian musician

Gustave Poncelet (1844-1903) was a Belgian clarinetist-saxophonist. He is credited with creating the first clarinet choir (this ensemble consisted of up to about twenty-seven players) at the Brussels Conservatory in the late nineteenth century while he was teaching there.
