= Thomas Piercy =

American musician

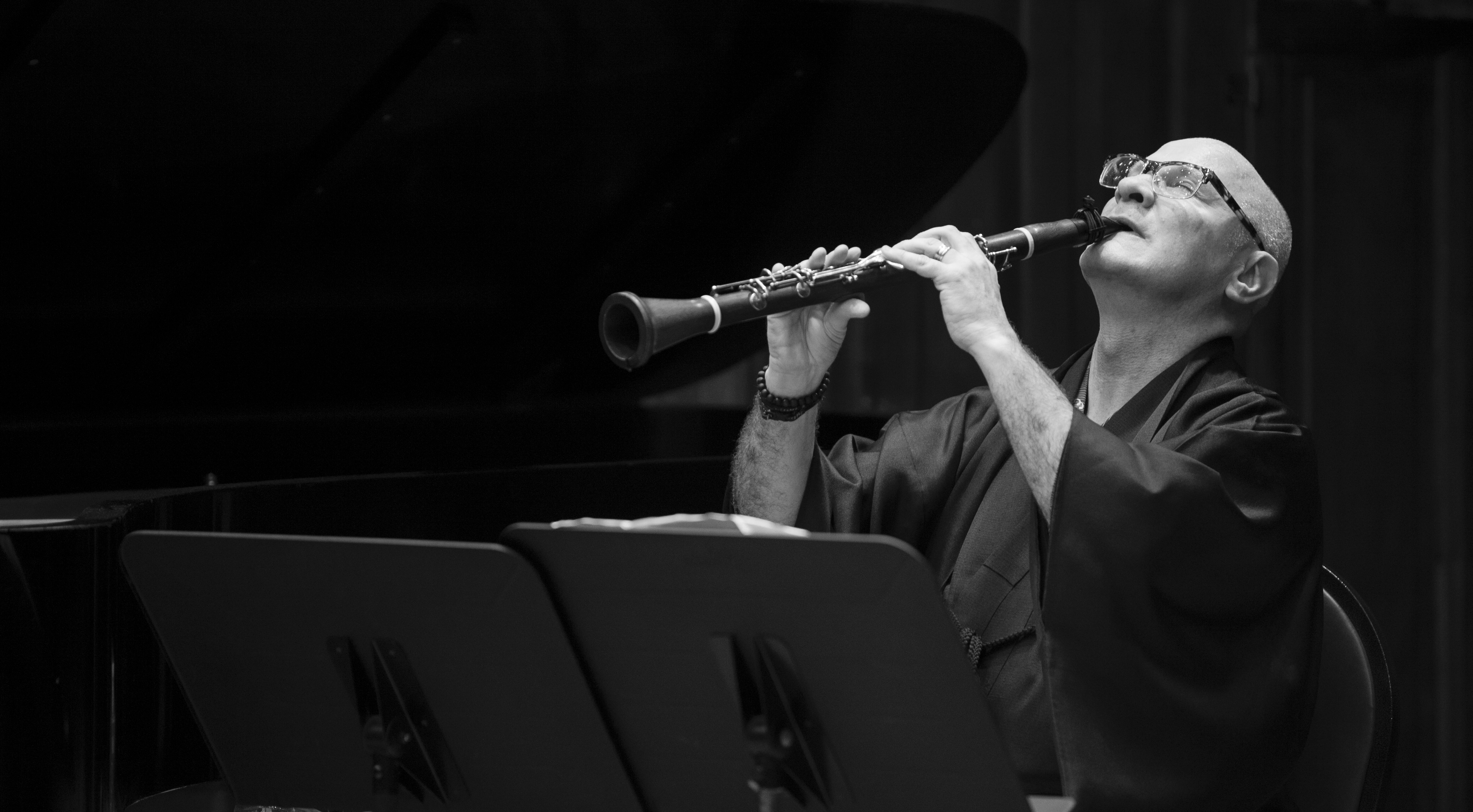
Thomas Piercy - Clarinet

Thomas Piercy is an American clarinetist and hichiriki player based in New York City, USA and Tokyo, Japan. Piercy is a critically acclaimed clarinetist and hichiriki player with concert appearances throughout the Americas, Asia, and Europe including performances at Carnegie Hall, Wigmore Hall, and Tokyo Opera City. Although he studied in the United States, his playing style has been influenced by the English school of clarinet playing through studies with English clarinetist Gervase de Peyer. He is a dedicated advocate for new music, having premiered more than 400 works written for him by over 250 composers, including Sir Richard Rodney Bennett, Jennifer Higdon, Fernando Otero, Ned Rorem, and Shoichi Yabuta. The New York Times praised his playing as "Brilliant...playing with refinement and flair," and critics have described his sound as "uniquely beautiful and consistently warm." His hichiriki playing can be heard on the Emmy Award-winning Netflix series Blue Eye Samurai, and he is currently one of the only non-Japanese professional gagaku performers in Japan. His performances of classical music by Brahms, Beethoven and contemporary composers have been reviewed in the New York Times.

== Education ==
He studied clarinet, voice and acting at Virginia Commonwealth University, Shenandoah Conservatory, Mannes College of Music and the Juilliard School. He studied clarinet in New York City with Gervase De Peyer, Leon Russianoff and Kalmen Opperman. He also studied hichiriki in Japan.

== Performances ==
He has performed contemporary pieces written for him, including Ned Rorem's only piece for clarinet and piano. He premiered this piece - "Four Colors" - at an 80th birthday concert celebration for Rorem at Carnegie Hall in 2003.

He has performed several times at the International Clarinet Festival. This has included including a concert in memory of Russianoff in 1991, a concert of contemporary American music in Japan in 2005, an Ástor Piazzolla program at the 2007 festival in Vancouver, and conducting and performing a nuevo tango program of music by Astor Piazzolla and a premiere by Michele Mangani at the 2016 ClarinetFest in Kansas City. Piercy was a headline artist at the 2025 ClarinetFest in which he premiered composer Bin Li's "Netori, Netori", a concerto for clarinet with gagaku ensemble and string orchestra.

== Gotham Ensemble ==
Piercy is the artistic director and clarinetist of the Gotham Ensemble. A mixed vocal and instrumental ensemble based in New York City, the Gotham Ensemble premieres, performs and records music, from the Classical to the avant-garde. Their performance of Olav Thommessen's music in a concern at Merkin Hall, New York City, was described in the New York Times as "pay[ing] more attention to the musical fundamentals of Mr. Thommessen's style than its larger implications. They drew out brilliantly the shimmering sonic richness". After a performance of Ned Rorem's "Ariel" at Weill Recital Hall at Carnegie Hall, Rorem described Gotham as one of America's important chamber music groups performing new music. Albany Records released Gotham Ensemble Plays Ned Rorem, a CD of Ned Rorem's chamber music featuring the clarinet.

== Other work ==
As a teacher he has contributed to books on clarinet studies and clarinet fingerings.
