= Russell Howland =

American music educator (1908–1995)

Russell Howland (1908 – 1995) was an American music educator.

== Career ==
Howland was born in Missouri, and studied at the University of Illinois. He was professor of woodwinds at the University of Michigan until 1948. From 1948 to 1975, Howland taught at Fresno State College in California, where he was active as an arranger and composer for wind band and clarinet choir. He was a member of the Fresno Saxophone Quartet from its founding in 1956, and played bass with the Fresno Philharmonic Orchestra.

In 1975 Howland was inducted into the hall of fame of the California Music Educators Association. In 2021, he was posthumously inducted into the Valley Music Hall of Fame.

== Personal life ==
Howland was married to Maxine Howland. He died in 1995.
