= James Waterson =

Scottish footballer

Personal information
- Place of birth: Scotland
- Position: Wing half

Senior career*
Years	Team	Apps	(Gls)
1893–1894	Arbroath		
1894–1895	Grimsby Town	20	(0)
1895–1896	Hull Albany		
1896–1???	Hull Town		
- * Club domestic league appearances and goals

James Waterson was a Scottish professional footballer who played as a wing half.
