= David Hite =

American clarinetist (1923–2004)

David L. Hite (September 25, 1923 – January 18, 2004) was an American clarinetist, teacher, and designer of clarinet mouthpieces.

== Biography ==
Born in New Straitsville, Ohio, David Hite studied clarinet with Fred Weaver, Daniel Bonade and Anthony Gigliotti.

In 1941, he enrolled in the Ohio State University School of Music later graduating after he completed his US Army service. In 1972 he completed his Master of Arts Degree in Music, also at Ohio State. During World War II he served in Guam and Okinawa as a band musician.

After the war, he played bass clarinet in the Columbus Philharmonic Orchestra where he met his first wife, the bassoonist and critic Rosemary Curtin Hite. In addition he performed with the Berkshire Music Festival Orchestra at Tanglewood where he played under Serge Koussevitzky.

From 1954 to 1978 he was professor of music at the Capital University Music Conservatory where he founded the Capital University Clarinet Choir. He left Columbus in 1983, to move to New York City, where he specialized in customizing and fine tuning clarinets, working with the leading players of the time. Later he settled in Fort Myers, Florida.

From the 1940s on, while teaching and playing, Hite also worked continuously on the development of a superior clarinet mouthpiece. With his second wife Jean Hite he founded the J&D Hite Mouthpiece Company in the 1980s. He was internationally recognized for his hand-finished J & D Hite clarinet and saxophone mouthpieces. The David Hite, and later J&D Hite, Premiere Mouthpiece was noted as one of the finest student mouthpieces made, enhancing the abilities of thousands of clarinet players throughout the U.S. The custom-made professional Hite mouthpiece was played by many symphony and band musicians. Following Hite's death in 2004 in Fort Myers, the Hite mouthpiece is now owned and distributed by the JJ Babbitt Company of Elkhart, Indiana.
