= Dampierre-sur-Moivre =

- Commune
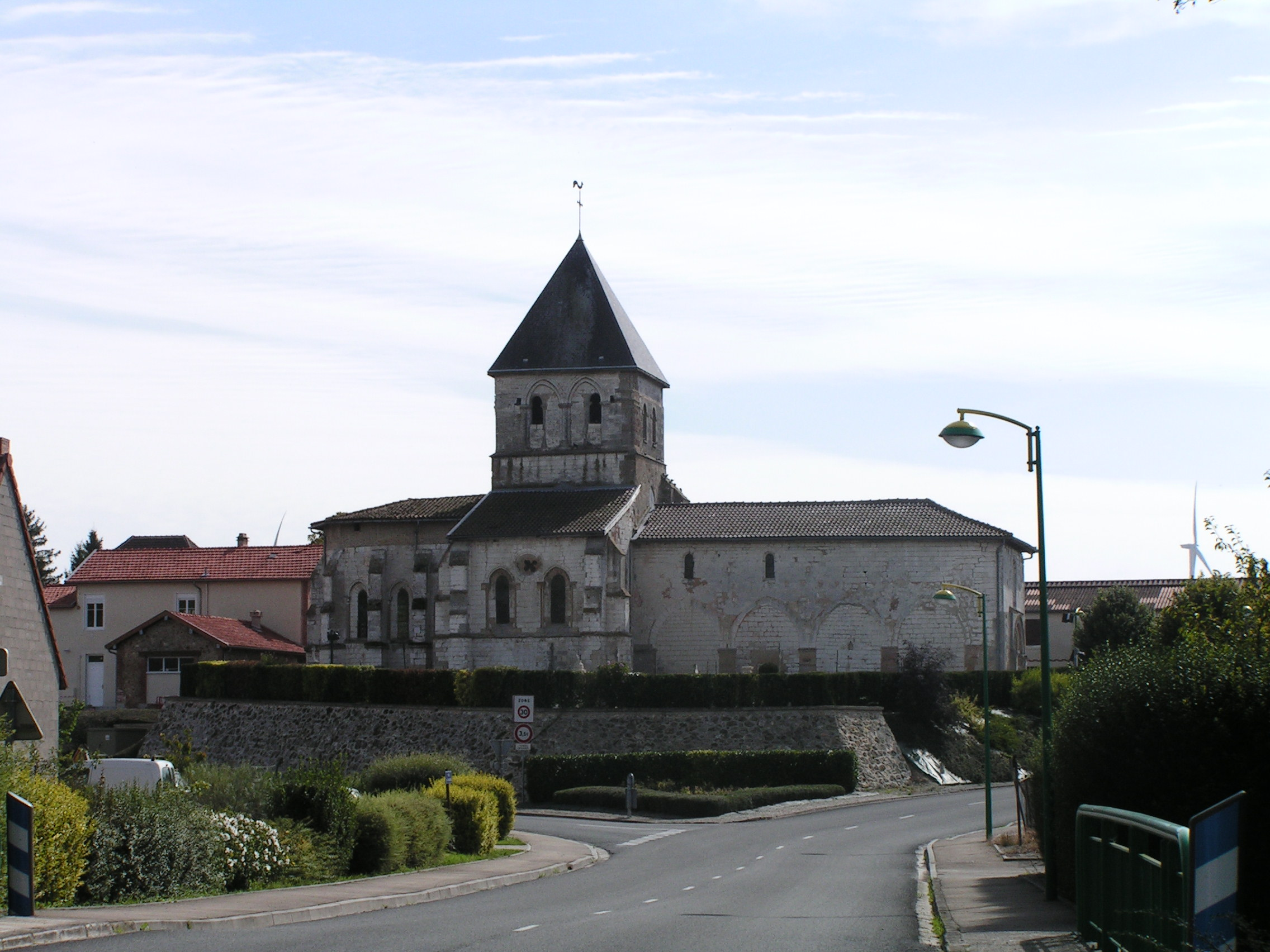
- Notre Dame Church in Dampierre-sur-Moivre

- Coat of arms
- Location of Dampierre-sur-Moivre
- Location within France Location within Grand Est
- Coordinates: 48°53′41″N 4°33′34″E
- Country: France
- Region: Grand Est
- Department: Marne
- Arrondissement: Châlons-en-Champagne
- Canton: Châlons-en-Champagne-3
- Intercommunality: CC de la Moivre à la Coole

Government
  - Mayor (2020–2026): Julien Valentin
- Area^{1}: 11.55 km^{2} (4.46 sq mi)
- Elevation: 105 m (344 ft)
- Population (2023): 107
  - Density: 9.26/km^{2} (24.0/sq mi)
- Time zone: UTC+01:00 (CET)
  - Summer (DST): UTC+02:00 (CEST)
- INSEE/Postal code: 51208 /51240
- ^{1} French Land Register data, which excludes lakes, ponds, glaciers > 1 km^{2} (0.386 sq mi or 247 acres) and river estuaries.

Dampierre-sur-Moivre (French pronunciation: [dɑ̃pjɛʁ syʁ mwavʁ]) is a commune in the Marne department in north-eastern France.

== See also ==
- Communes of the Marne department
