= Ernesto Cavallini =

Italian clarinetist and composer

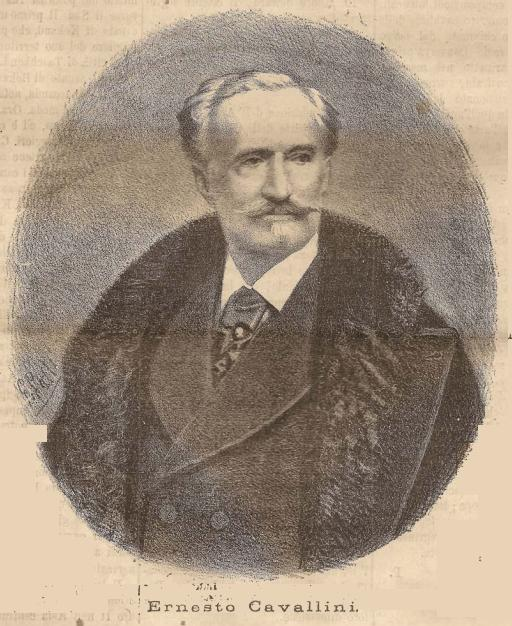
- Born: August 30, 1807; Milan, Italy
- Died: 1874
- Education: Milan Conservatory
- Occupations: Clarinetist, composer
- Notable work: Adagio and Tarantella, 30 Caprices for Clarinet

Ernesto Cavallini (30 August 1807 – 1874) was an Italian clarinetist and composer.

Born in Milan, Cavallini studied at the Milan Conservatory under Carulli. He performed at the Conservatoire Concerts in 1830 with his brother, violinist Eugenio Cavallini. He became the principal clarinetist of La Scala under Giacomo Panizza. He also taught at the Milan Conservatory and spent 15 years performing in St Petersburg from 1852 to 1867.

Cavallini played on a six-key boxwood clarinet, which was considered an "outdated" instrument. Cavallini was described as the "Paganini of the clarinet". His playing inspired Verdi to compose a clarinet solo and cadenza in his 1862 La forza del destino, and led Panizza to include a set of variations for clarinet in his The Challenge of Barletta.

As a composer, he is best known for Adagio and Tarantella, Adagio Sentimental, his fantasies, and his 30 Caprices for Clarinet. Cavallini also composed several works for E♭ clarinet, including the Carnival of Venice variations, I figli di Eduardo 4th in partnership with Panizza, and Fantasia on a Theme from Ultimo Giorno di Pompeii. He cited Rossini as an influence in his compositions, and composed Una Lagrima sulla Tomba dell'Immortale Rossini in his honour. His compositions were often performed by fellow clarinetist Ferdinando Busoni, but he performed one of his fantasias for the Philharmonic Society in London on 2 May 1842 and again 23 June 1845. A new CPO c.d.(CPO 777 938-2,63 minutes) of Cavallini's 1st & 2nd clarinet concertos & a Fantasy & Variations is now available.
