= The Instrumentalist =

- Editor: James M. Rohner
- Former editors: James T. Rohner (Previous Publisher)
- Categories: music magazine
- Frequency: Every two months
- Publisher: Ann R. Callis, James M. Rohner
- Founder: Traugott Rohner (1906–1991)
- Founded: September 1946 (78 years ago)
- First issue: September/October 1946
- Company: The Instrumentalist Publishing Co.
- Country: United States
- Based in: Northbrook, Illinois
- Language: English
- Website: www.theinstrumentalist.com
- ISSN: 0020-4331
- OCLC: 1753312

The Instrumentalist is an American bimonthly magazine for music educators — focusing on junior and senior high school band and orchestra. Founded by Traugott Rohner (1906–1991), its first publication was dated September/October 1946. Its original address was in Glen Ellyn, Illinois. The current holding company, The Instrumentalist Publishing Co., is an Illinois corporation, based in Northbrook, Illinois, and headed by Ann Rohner Callis and James M. Rohner.

== Former frequency ==
- 1946: September/October to 1950: May/June — Bimonthly (published during the school year)
- 1950: September to 1953: May/June — 6 per year
- 1953: September to 1955: May — 9 per year
- 1955: September to 1957: June 1957 — 10 per year
- 1957: August to 1959: November — 11 per year

== Sponsor of awards ==
- John Philip Sousa Band Award, an annual award introduced by The Instrumentalist in 1955 to recognize superior musicianship, dedication, and achievement. It is the top honor for high school band students.
- Louis Armstrong Jazz Award
- National School Orchestra Award
- National School Choral Award
- Patrick S Gilmore Band Award
- Leonard Bernstein Musicianship Award
- Woody Herman Jazz Award
- National School Marching and Color Guard Awards
- Director's Awards for Band, Orchestra, and Chorus
