= International Clarinet Association =

Clarinet performance organization

The logo of the International Clarinet Association

The International Clarinet Association is the main international organization bringing together players of the clarinet. It is based in Lincoln, Nebraska, United States. The ICA publishes The Clarinet, a quarterly journal, produces an annual festival known as ClarinetFest, supports a research library and score collection, and in other ways advances the international study of the clarinet.

== History ==
The International Clarinet Society began in 1964, as the University of Denver called for and funded national conferences to mark its centennial year. Clarinet professor Ralph Strouf organized logistics while his teacher and mentor, Keith Stein, provided artistic direction for the first National Clarinet Clinic, a five-day conference. Strouf organized subsequent annual Clinics until he left the University of Denver in 1967. Clarinetist Ramon Kireilis took over the professorship and the National Clarinet Clinic.

In 1973, Kireilis organized the International Clarinet Society with National Clarinet Clinic participants, becoming the Society's first president. The organization drafted a mission statement, formed officers and committees, and began the publication of the quarterly journal, The Clarinet.

In 1988, the International Clarinet Society merged with ClariNetwork International. The former organization focused primarily on academic clarinetists, while the latter focused on professional performers. In 1991 the organization was renamed to the International Clarinet Association.

== Organizational Products ==
The National Clarinet Clinic became the International Clarinet Clinic, which was renamed the International Clarinet Congress and then the International Clarinet Conference, and then later transformed further to ClarFest and then ClarinetFest.

The ICA hosts several competitions: composition, high school, orchestral audition, research, and young artist.

After the death of the Society's third president, Jerry Pierce, in 1994, the International Clarinet Association purchased his extensive clarinet score library, which is now a large portion of the ICA Research Center at the University of Maryland. Over 6000 scores are available for circulation to ICA members and members of the University of Maryland community. The ICA Research Library also contains the Jerry Pierce Papers and the Daniel Bonade Papers.
