= Seminole Hot Springs, California =

Unincorporated community in California, United States

- Unincorporated community
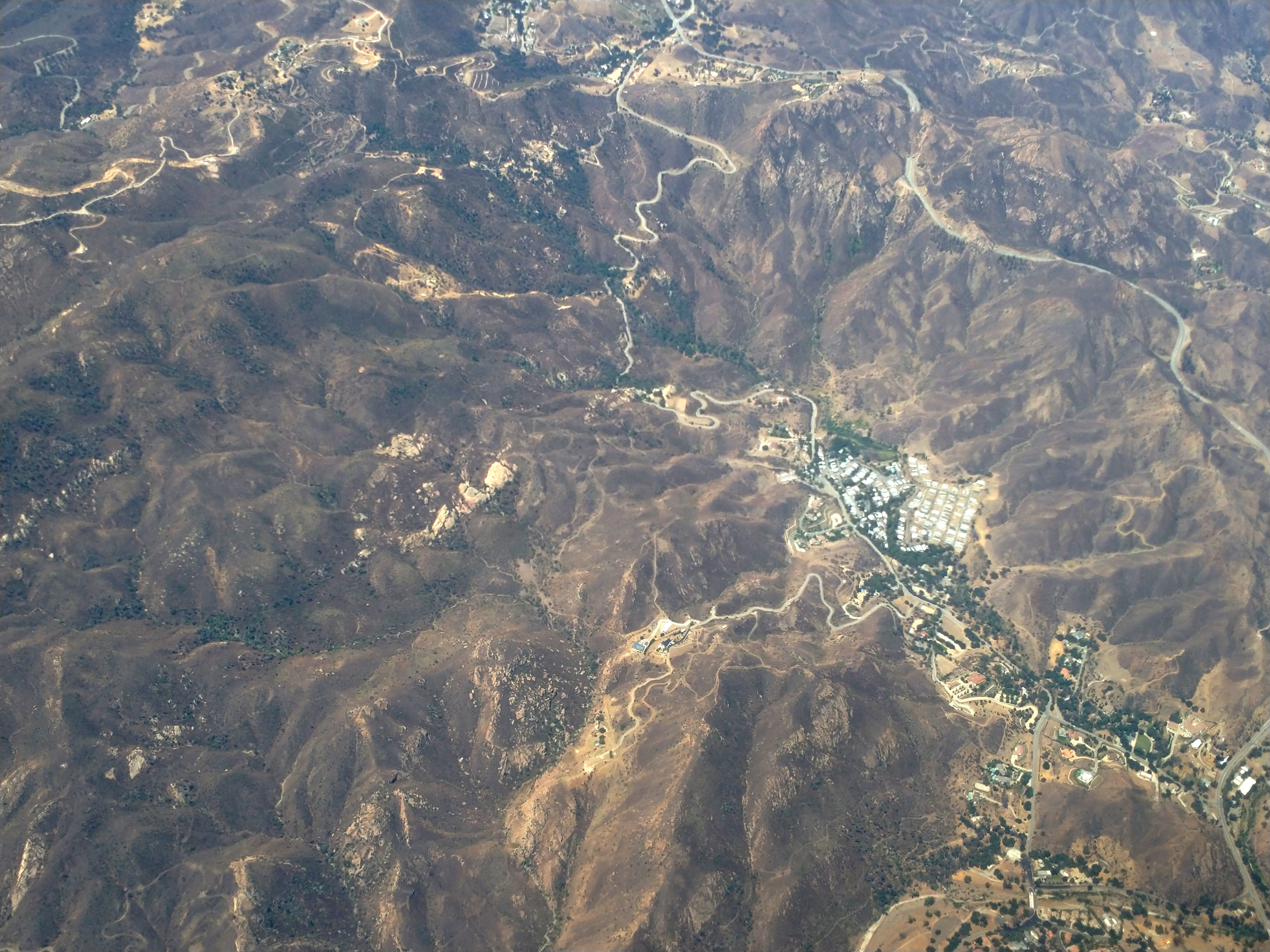
- Seminole Springs mobile-home park near Cornell

- Location within California
- Coordinates: 34°06′26″N 118°47′26″W
- Country: United States
- State: California
- County: Los Angeles
- Elevation: 932 ft (284 m)
- Time zone: UTC-8 (Pacific (PST))
  - Summer (DST): UTC-7 (PDT)
- Area code: 818
- GNIS feature ID: 1661420

Seminole Hot Springs, California
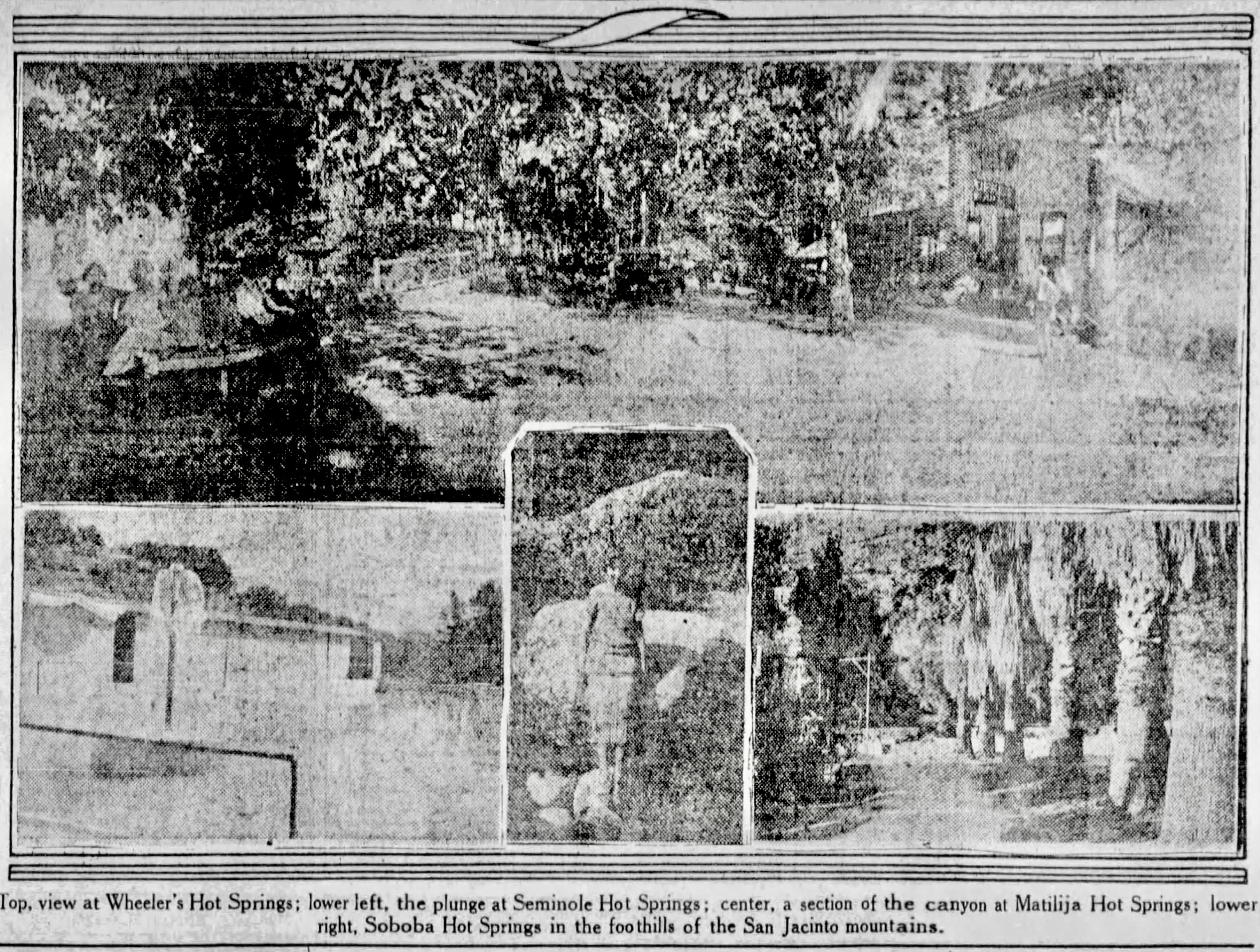
- Los Angeles Evening Express, 1924: Wheeler's Hot Springs, the plunge at Seminole Hot Springs, Matilija Hot Springs, Soboba Hot Springs
- Interactive map of Seminole Hot Springs, California
- Type: geothermal
- Discharge: 65 liters/minute
- Temperature: 116 °F (47 °C)
- Depth: 2,600 feet (790 m)

Seminole Hot Springs is an unincorporated community in Los Angeles County, California, United States. Seminole Hot Springs is located in the Santa Monica Mountains near Cornell, 3.6 miles (5.8 km) south-southeast of Agoura Hills at an elevation of 932 feet (284 m).

== History ==
The settlement began as a resort built around a hot spring. The springs were first identified in 1911, and the spa closed in 1959. As was the case with Radium Sulphur Springs and Bimini Hot Springs elsewhere in Los Angeles County, the waters of Seminole Hot Springs were commercialized after oil drillers hit water instead of petroleum. Major fires passed through the area in the 1930s and 1940s. The 1941 American Guide to Los Angeles described Seminole Hot Springs as "a year-round health and pleasure resort resort, with springs, cottages, bathhouse, open-air mineral water plunge, and cafe buried in a copse of sycamores below the level of the road."

In 1966, an investor group headed up by James R. Biram, was formed to develop Seminole Hot Springs Mobile Home Park. The park used the mineral water as an amenity of the recreation building for the residents. The artesian mineral well gave out. Years later, the park was converted to a resident-owned mobile home community. It is a suburb of the Agoura–Calabasas area. The Woolsey Fire of 2018 destroyed 100 of the 215 mobile homes at Seminole Hot Springs.

== Additional images ==
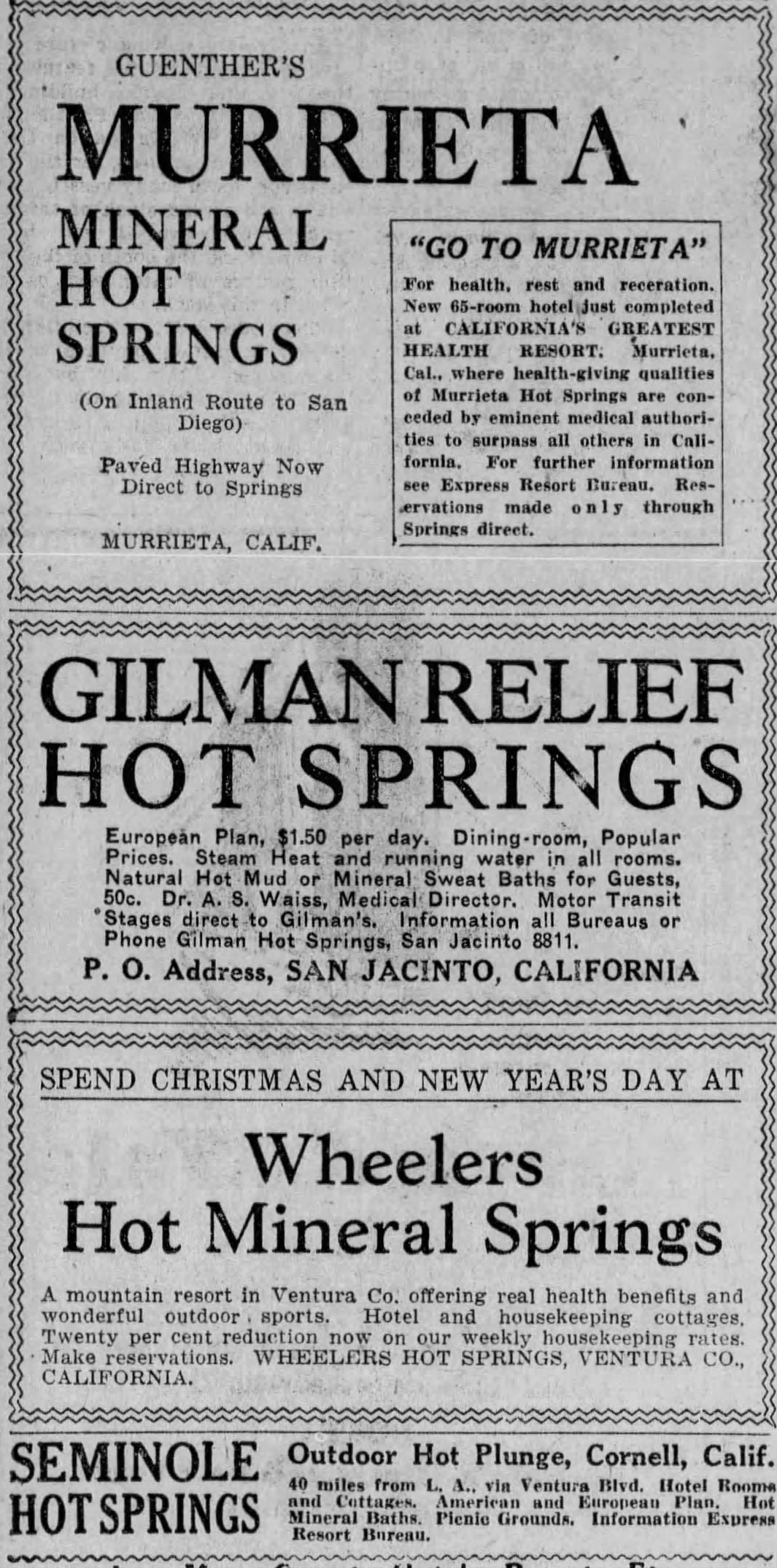
Stack of ads for SoCal spring resorts in the Los Angeles Evening Express, 1926: Guenther's Murrieta Mineral Hot Springs, Gilman Relief Hot Springs, Wheelers Hot Mineral Springs, and Seminole Hot Springs

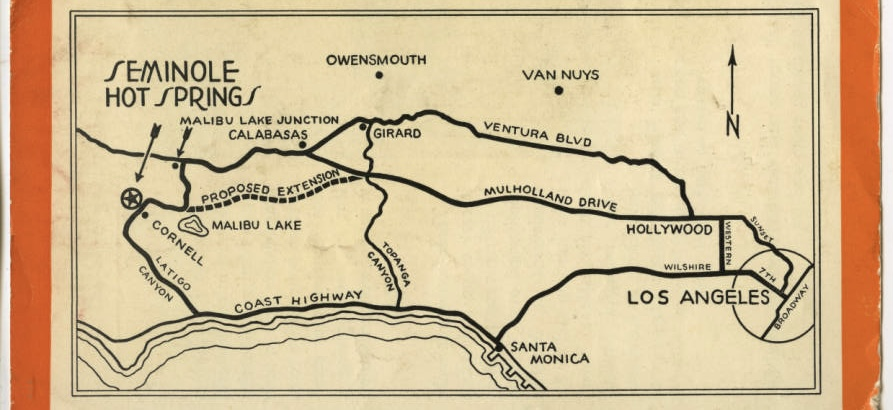
Route map to Seminole Hot Springs (Pepperdine University, Malibu Historical Collection, Anderson00122)

== See also ==
- Alvarado Hot Springs
- Radium Sulphur Springs
- Bimini Baths
