= Beverly Hot Springs =

Thermal springs in Los Angeles, California

- Oxford Hot Springs; Beverly Hills Hot Springs
- Interactive map of Beverly Hot Springs
- Location: Koreatown, Los Angeles
- Coordinates: 34°04′35.8″N 118°18′27.5″W
- Elevation: 300 ft (91 m)
- Type: geothermal
- Discharge: 250,000 gallons per day
- Temperature: 105 °F (41 °C)

Beverly Hot Springs is the only remaining natural geothermal hot spring within the center of the city of Los Angeles. It is located between Beverly Hills and downtown Los Angeles on what is now Oxford Avenue.

== History ==
The spring was used by the local Indigenous people prior to settlement of the area. In 1769 the Portolá expedition passed through this geographic area and noted the quantity of water sources, from springs to streams and marshes.

The hot spring was discovered by oil drillers in 1910, when a well was drilled in the area. This occurred prior to 1915, when the first water mains were developed in Los Angeles.

At the beginning of the 1920s, the Los Angeles leadership began the process of filling-in wetlands and burying natural sources of water – including hot springs – as an effort to promote real estate sales.

After re-discovery in 1931, the mineral water was bottled and sold for drinking under the name "Wonder Water" and was claimed to be "Natures own formula," until just after World War II. It was sold for ten cents per gallon, and was claimed to have healing properties that could resolve "acidity and kindred troubles."

In 1984, a thermal spa was established at the site by Yang Cha Kim, a Korean doctor of Oriental medicine and her husband. Later the property turned over to another owner.

In 2023, KCRW radio reported that plans are in the works cap the artesian thermal spring source and to demolish the spa facility to build a housing development. An organization was formed, the Save Beverly Hot Springs Alliance, to designate the springs as a protected historical site.

== Water profile ==
The natural artesian hot spring water emerges from the aquifer located at 2,200 feet below ground. It is cooled to a range of 96 °F (36 °C) to 105 °F (41 °C) into several tile-lined soaking pools. The hot spring water temperature is 105 °F (41 °C). The water discharges at a flow rate of 250,000 gallons per day. The alkaline water has a mineral content of aluminum oxide, iron, magnesium carbonate, silica, sodium bicarbonate, sodium carbonate, sodium chloride, and sodium sulfate.

== Location ==
Beverly Hot Springs is located in the Koreatown neighborhood of Los Angeles. At one time, this area contained numerous hot springs.

== See also ==
- Bimini Baths
- Radium Sulphur Springs
