= Shakespeare Bridge =

Los Angeles Historic-Cultural Monument

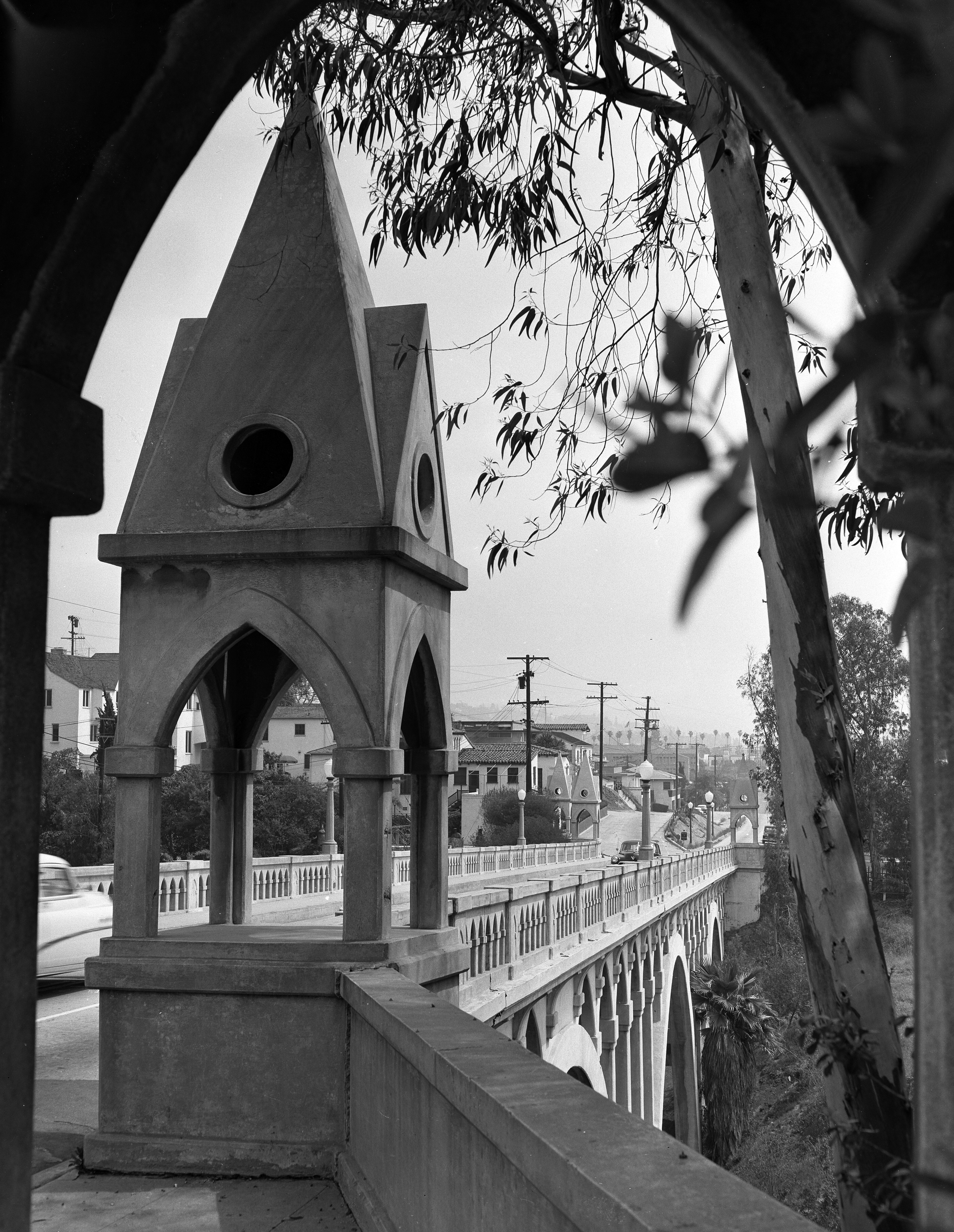
- Shakespeare Bridge in 1956
- Coordinates: 34°06′20″N 118°16′46″W
- Carries: Franklin Avenue
- Crosses: Arroyo de la Sacatela
- Locale: Franklin Hills section of Los Angeles, California

Characteristics
- Design: Open-spandrel reinforced concrete deck arch bridge
- Total length: 260 feet (79 m)
- Width: 30 feet (9.1 m)

History
- Opened: 1926 – rebuilt 1998

Location
- Interactive map of Shakespeare Bridge

Franklin Avenue Bridge (Shakespeare Bridge)
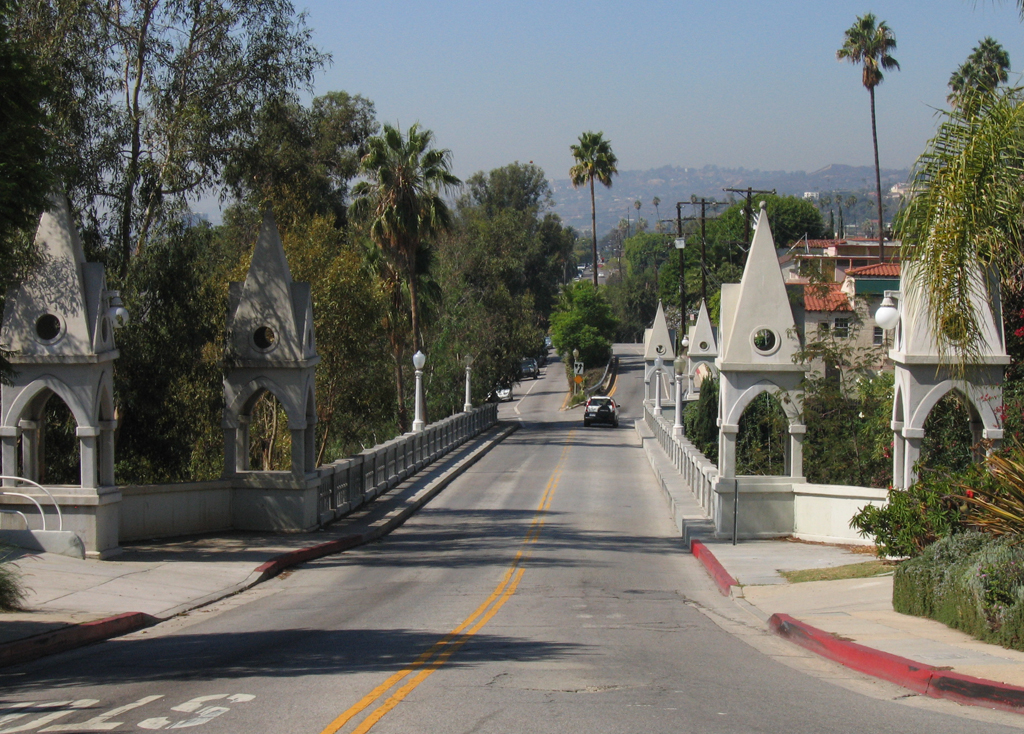
- Shakespeare Bridge in 2007
- Interactive map of Franklin Avenue Bridge (Shakespeare Bridge)

Los Angeles Historic-Cultural Monument
- Designated: April 17, 1974
- Reference no.: 126

The Shakespeare Bridge, officially the Franklin Avenue Bridge, in the Franklin Hills neighborhood of Los Angeles, California, was built in 1926. It is made of concrete and decorated in a Gothic style, with eight turrets. It was named after William Shakespeare and later designated a Los Angeles Historic-Cultural Monument #126 in 1974.

== History ==
Shakespeare Bridge was built to cross over Arroyo de la Sacatela, a part of the Ballona Creek watershed, which prior to 1930 fed Bimini Slough in what is now Koreatown. It is 262 feet (80 meters) long.

The bridge was rebuilt in 1998 after the Northridge earthquake due to concerns that the structure would not be stable in the event of an earthquake in the Franklin Hills area. As part of the seismic retrofit, the deck, sidewalks and railings were removed and reconstructed using reinforced concrete. The expansion joints were also removed, so the bridge deck is now a one-piece structural diaphragm built to transfer all seismic forces into the abutment walls at either end of the bridge. All of the rebuilding was done in order to preserve the historic appearance of the bridge.

== See also ==
- List of bridges documented by the Historic American Engineering Record in California
