= Alvarado Hot Springs =

Defunct water source in California

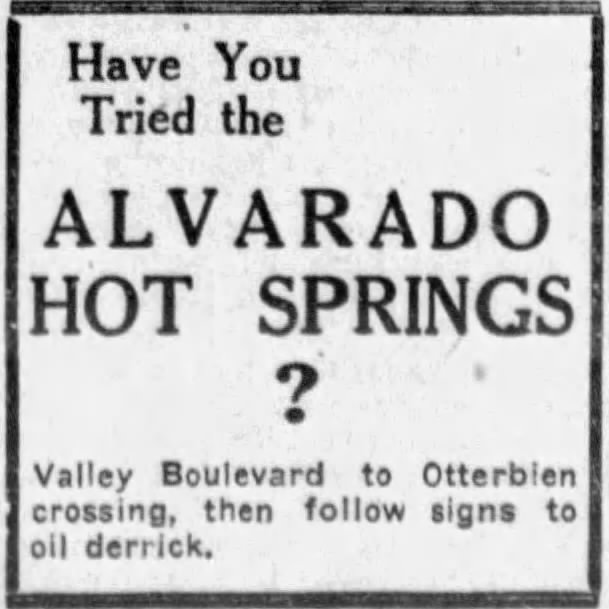
- The Pomona Progress Bulletin, Feb. 6, 1926
- Interactive map of Alvarado Hot Springs
- Location: Puente Hills, Los Angeles County, California, U.S.
- Coordinates: 33°58′55″N 117°53′18″W
- Type: geothermal
- Temperature: 44 °C (111 °F)
- Depth: 1,525 metres (5,003 ft)

Alvarado Hot Springs was a 20th-century geothermal well in Los Angeles County, California, United States. A bathhouse was built next to the water and a therapeutic spa was operated on the site for several decades.

== History ==
The source of the water was a 5,000 feet (1,500 m) large-diameter petroleum test well drilled that yielded hot water and natural gas. On November 7, 1924, a six-inch well bore hit hot water at 3,400 feet (1,000 m) and gas at 4,240 feet (1,290 m). The water was pumped up to a tank for recreational-therapeutic use and the gas was used to heat the bathhouse. The well was drilled and owned by rancher William P. Alvarado. Alvarado also piped the natural gas to his house, a mile from the well site, for use in cooking and lighting, and combined the water with water from other sources for use in agricultural irrigation.

The bathhouse was located just off Fifth Avenue, roughly three miles southeast of the town limits of La Puente. As described in 1926, the Alvarado Hot Springs spa was on the far slope of the Alvarado Ranch "in the hills about a mile and one-half west of the Otterbein road that runs south from Valley boulevard...The route to the springs is fairly circuitous but well signed and the road leads at last to a towering wooden oil well derrick mounted on a knoll from which much of the valley and Old Baldy in the distance Is visible." There were four baths for men and three for women, as well as sweat rooms.

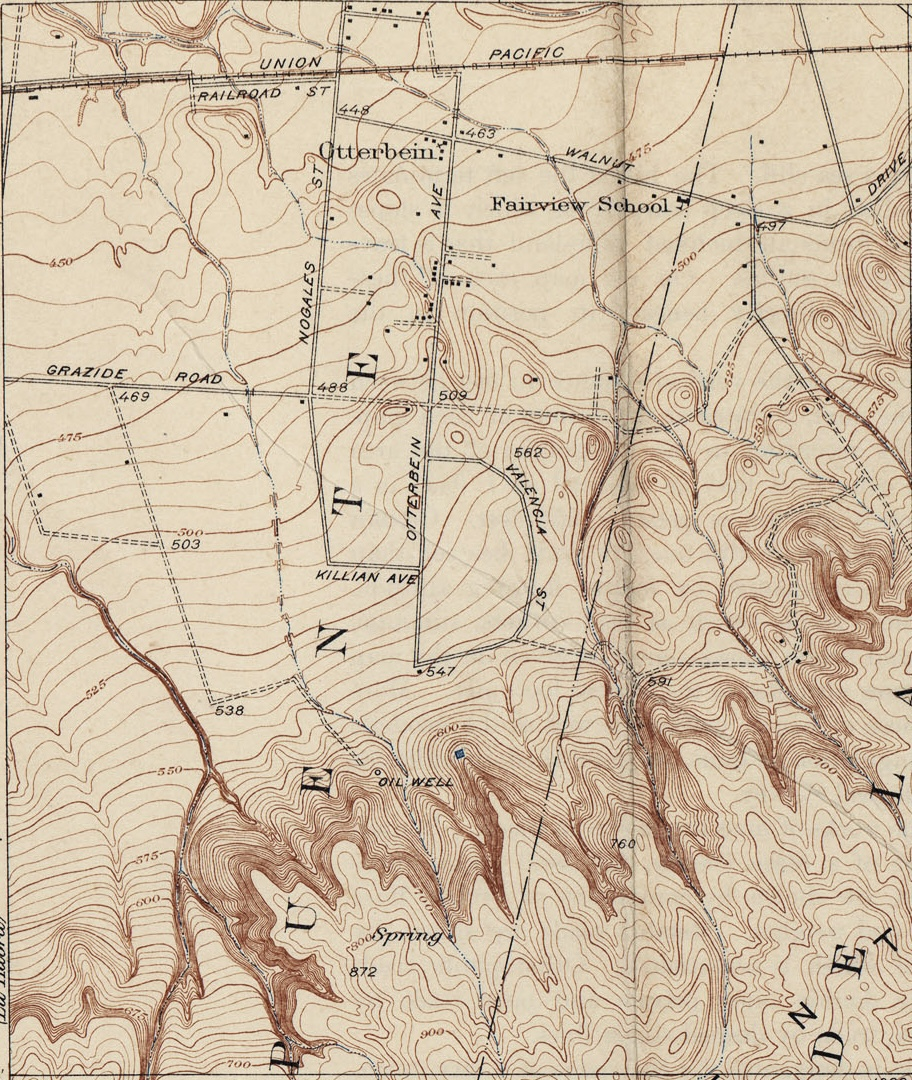
1928 edition of USGS La Brea quadrangle map

Alvarado Hot Springs and Seminole Hot Springs were the two major therapeutic hot springs spas within Los Angeles County as of 1937. The bathhouse, situated on about 20 acres of land, was still in business as of 1961, street address 1880 E. 5th Street in La Puente, California. The former site of the well lies within a residential neighborhood in Rowland Heights.

== See also ==
- List of hot springs in the United States § California
- Radium Sulphur Springs
- Fairview Hot Springs
- Bimini Baths
- La Vida Mineral Springs
