= Ojala, California =

Unincorporated community in California, United States

- Unincorporated community
- Location within California Location within the United States
- Coordinates: 34°29′04″N 119°17′57″W
- Country: United States
- State: California
- County: Ventura
- Elevation: 965 ft (294 m)
- Time zone: UTC-8 (Pacific (PST))
  - Summer (DST): UTC-7 (PDT)
- Area code: 805
- GNIS feature ID: 1661136

Ojala (/oʊˈhɑːlə/; Spanish: Ojalá) is an unincorporated community in Ventura County, California, United States. Ojala is located along California State Route 33, 4.1 miles (6.6 km) northwest of Ojai. Ojala sits at the foot of Nordhoff Ridge in Los Padres National Forest. Ojala was once served by the smallest post office in the United States, which was the size of a phone booth. It burned in the 2017 Thomas fire at its last location, in neighboring Wheeler Springs. Since then it has been rebuilt by the Los Padres Forest Association with the help of many volunteers and cooperation of the USFS Ojai District at Wheeler Gorge Visitor Center a mile and a half from its previous location on HW-33. . Ojala was one of the first tourist attractions by Ojai Valley, primarily due to its natural hot springs.

Ojala is Spanish and translates into "hopefully" or as an expression of hope. The community of about 8 houses can only be reached by a single road.

== See also ==
- Matilija Dam
