= Fairview Hot Springs =

Resort and well in California, U.S. (~1887–~1918)

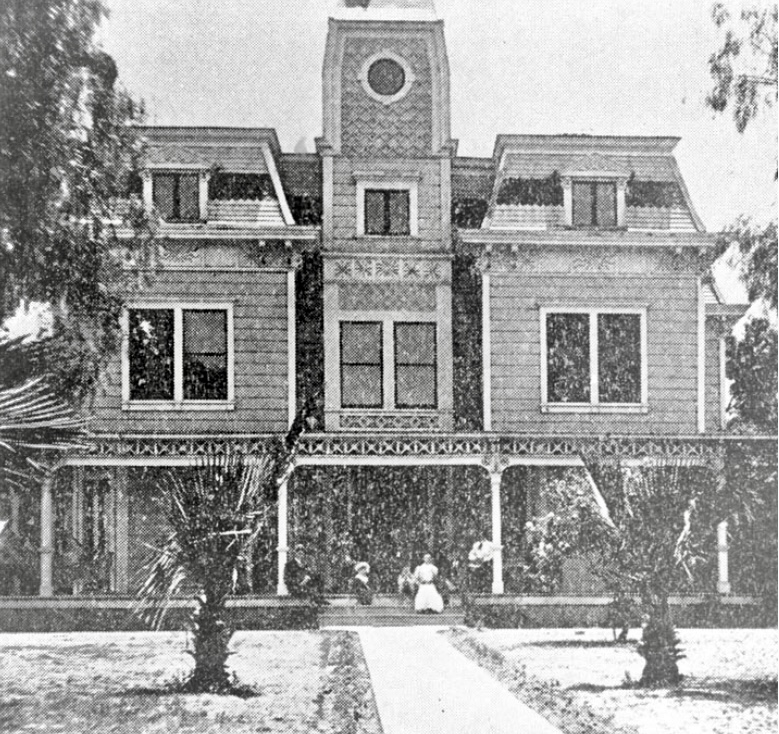
- Fairview Hot Springs Hotel c. 1890
- Interactive map of Fairview Hot Springs
- Coordinates: 33.664°N 117.913°W
- Type: geothermal
- Discharge: 15 US gallons (57 L; 12 imp gal) per min
- Temperature: 96 °F (36 °C)

Fairview Hot Springs was a resort hotel in Fairview, California, United States (present-day Costa Mesa, Orange County, California) from about 1887 to about 1918. The source of the water that constituted the "hot springs" was actually a well that yielded a combination of heated artesian water and natural gas. The Fairview Hot Springs was known for its mud baths, but the Fairview development was already languishing when—due to either financial failure generally, or the 1918 San Jacinto earthquake specifically—the resort hotel closed its doors for good around 1918.

== History ==
According to a history published in 1937, the Fairview Development Company was organized in 1887, just as the railroad was coming through. In addition to a rail connection, a street grid, and house lots, the developers sought to exploit the area's below-ground water and gas resources. An undated handbill printed by the developers of Fairview promised potential customers that "a natural gas well is flowing on land adjoining the town, and arrangements are now being made to light the town with natural gas" and trumpeted "a magnificent three-story hotel now contracted!" According to the 1937 history, "The method of harnessing the natural gas supplied by the mineral springs was interesting if not original. A cover resembling a huge wash tub was inverted over the water tank and held down with chains. Pipes led from this curious gas tank to the bath house which really was heated and lighted with the gas. It was never installed in the other buildings, as the end of the boom came too soon."

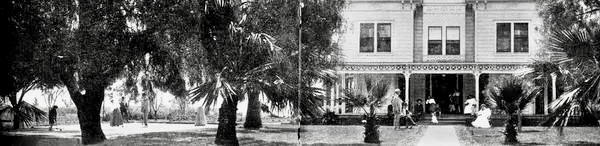
Fairview Hot Springs Hotel advertisement image

In his Springs of California report of 1915, U.S. government geologist Gerald A. Waring described the Fairview water as a "warm spring or well" on the coastal plain south of Santa Ana:

...Originally the Fairview Spring was a natural flow, but a casing that was sunk to a depth of 700 feet (210 m) into it has converted it into a flowing artesian well. In 1908 a hotel and cottages provided accommodations for about 50 people. The water rises with a temperature of 96 °F (36 °C) and supplies a swimming plunge and tub baths. The discharge varies somewhat with the season; in December, 1908, it was about 15 US gallons (57 L; 12 imp gal) a minute. An odorless, inflammable gas rises with the water and is burned for cooking and lighting. The water, which is colored brown, doubtless from organic stain, has been placed on the local market for table use under the label Amberis Water. Although the water has a faint oily taste, it is thought to be essentially ground water that here rises through the deep alluvium which forms this part of the coastal plain. Its origin is probably not related to the shales of the oil-bearing series of Southern California that form low hills a mile southward, except as these shales act as an underground dam that forces the alluvial water of the artesian basin of this region to the surface.

According to the Santa Ana Public Library history department, the hotel "was known for its mud baths" and advertised croquet grounds, "spacious verandas" and "Recreation-Rest". In 1889, a week at the Fairview Hotel cost about $10. The exact location of the original hotel is unclear; it was eventually moved four blocks to present-day Merrimac Way and Harbor Boulevard, near the southwest corner of Orange Coast College in Costa Mesa.

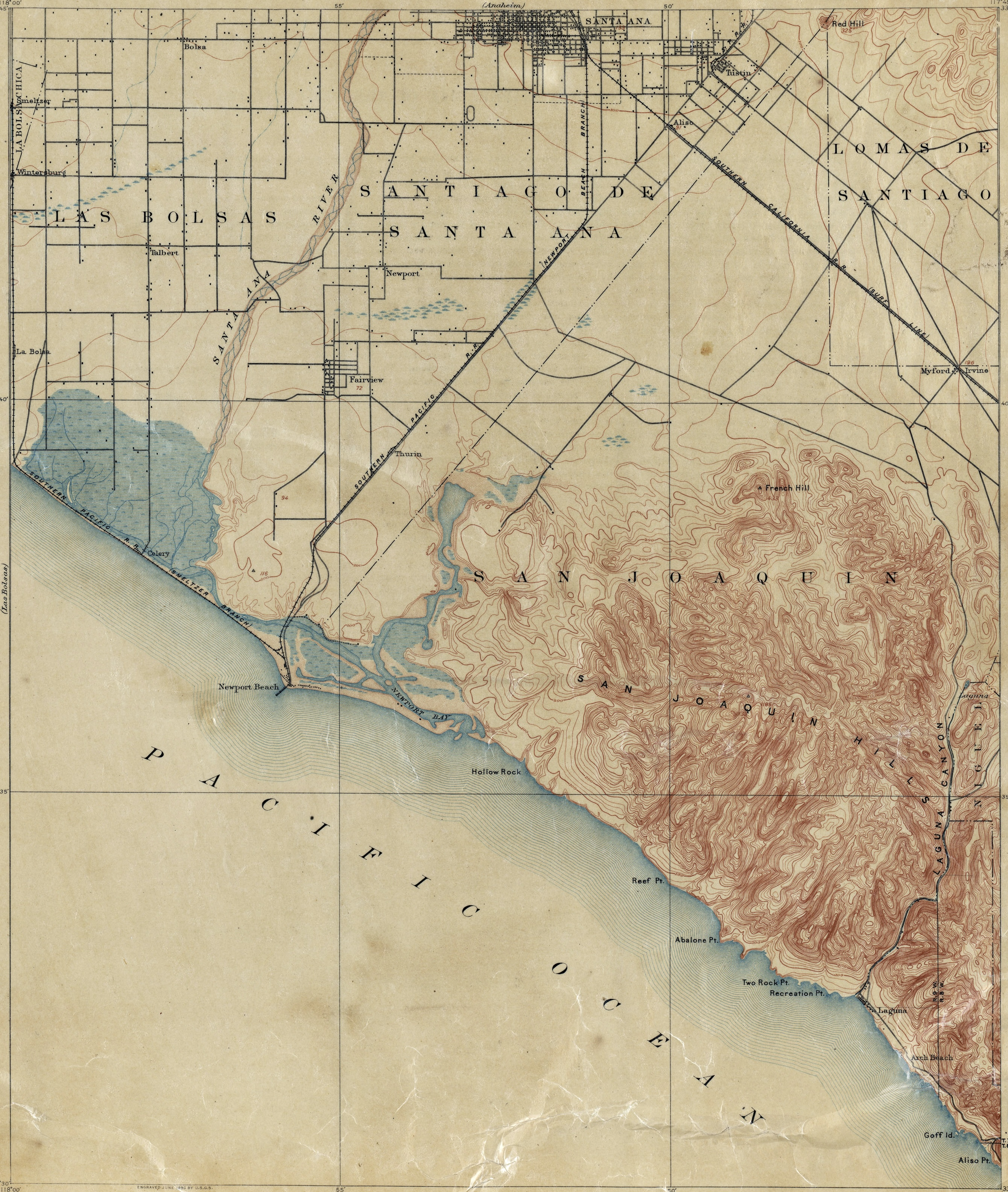
Fairview, rail lines, and the "famous celery" (USGS Santa Ana quadrangle, 1900)

A 1907 advertisement promised a California Carlsbad located near "the famous celery fields", and offered what it claimed were "medicated celery peat mud baths". Treatments were recommended for those who wished to recover in a "home-like atmosphere" from rheumatism, gout, or "blood disorders". Access could be had by an hour-long ride from the Pacific Electric depot in downtown Los Angeles via the Newport Beach line, departures 9:10 a.m. and 3:10 p.m. daily. In 1908, Mrs. G. S. Hiles bought the "GARDEN SPOT OF ORANGE COUNTY" from Mr. W. S. Collins and advertised, "Come out and take a plunge bath in the only mineral water of its kind in the world; 25¢ including suit and towels, either for ladies or gentlemen. Beautiful lawns and picnic grounds, tennis court and croquet grounds, all free to our guests. Special Sunday dinner 50¢. Sandwiches 10¢ Soda Water, Cigars and Cigarettes." In February 1910, A.E. Hiles sold the hotel for $7,100 to Thomas Trythall of Santa Ana. In December 1910 the hotel was sold again, to three men from Blackfoot, Iowa: James Mackie, J.E. Howard, and J. Bethel. Circa 1912 the hotel advertised its cement "swimming plunge," which was 60 x 100 with depths ranging from 3 1/2 to 7 feet and had just been scrubbed out and filled with 96 °F (36 °C) mineral water. According to a tiny news item published, inexplicably, in 1965, "The 1918 earthquake destroyed the old Fairview Hot Springs Hotel where health seekers sought the cures of the hot sulphur springs." This is probably a reference to the 6.7-M_{w} San Jacinto earthquake of April 21, 1918. On June 10, 1918, Cora Mackie, Fairview Hot Springs, advertised the sale of four bath tubs, a 100-gallon distillate tank, 100-gallon galvanized tank, and a number of pieces of farm equipment. Other reports have it that Charles TeWinkle bought the building in 1920 and demolished it, or that it burned in a fire.

As of 1937, all that remained of Fairview was "the remains of the old pool" and the "dying palms and pepper trees" that had once surrounded the hotel.

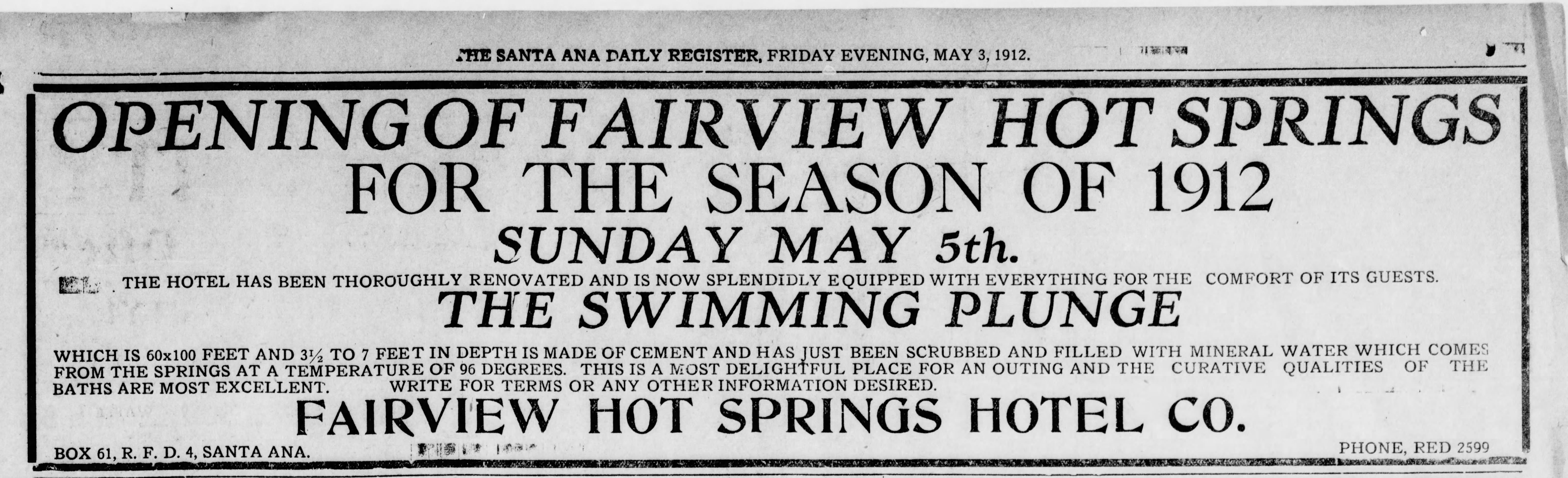
1912 at Fairview

== See also ==
- San Juan Hot Springs
- Alvarado Hot Springs
- List of hot springs in the United States § California
