= Kalman Bloch =

- Born: May 30, 1913; Harlem, New York City, New York, United States
- Died: March 12, 2009 (aged 95) Los Angeles, California, United States
- Genre: Classical
- Occupations: Clarinetist, musician
- Instrument: Clarinet

Kalman Bloch (May 30, 1913, in Harlem – March 12, 2009, in Los Angeles) was principal clarinetist of the Los Angeles Philharmonic for more than 40 years.

Bloch studied with Simeon Bellison, a notable clarinetist for the New York Philharmonic. As recounted by Dorothy Lamb Crawford in her 2009 book "A Windfall of Musicians: Hitler's Émigrés and Exiles in Southern California," Bloch was hired at the age of 21 by then music director and recent Jewish emigre Otto Klemperer just before the onset of World War II.

Bloch also performed on several film soundtracks, including those of John Williams, Walt Disney's Fantasia, Sunset Boulevard, For Whom the Bell Tolls, North by Northwest, The Wizard of Oz, and Chinatown. He was also a prolific collaborator in Southern California, playing for and recording with conductors such as Arnold Schoenberg and Igor Stravinsky upon their move to Los Angeles along with many other Jewish artists and intellectuals during and after World War II. Bloch also appears on multiple classical recordings with composers and conductors Zubin Mehta, Carlo Maria Giulini, Esa-Pekka Salonen, Otto Klemperer, and Alfred Wallenstein.

As recounted in the April 21, 1956 Los Angeles Times article "Spectators Stir Uproar at Red Probe," Bloch was forced to testify before the House Un-American Activities Committee (HUAC) for his and his wife's (artist Frances Bloch-Heifetz) progressive activities in Southern California after World War II. Evoking the 1st and 5th Amendments, he refused to answer any questions regarding his membership in the Communist Party, instead telling the committee that he "abhorred violence." His passport was taken and he was refused travel for the philharmonic's Asian tour that same year.

Bloch lived and taught in his home and studio in the Franklin Hills neighborhood of Los Feliz for over 50 years. He also taught clarinet at Pomona College and Cal State Fullerton and wrote several books on symphonic repertoire for clarinet. Until his death at the age of 95 in 2009 he was active in progressive and leftist political causes, an active clarinet teacher, and member of the Los Feliz Woodwind Ensemble along with former Frank Zappa and the Mothers of Invention member Bunk Gardner.

== Family ==
Kalman Bloch is related through his wife Frances (died 2000) to violinist Jascha Heifetz.

His daughter, Michele Zukovsky, is an acclaimed clarinetist and served as principal clarinetist with the Los Angeles Philharmonic from 1961 to 2015.

His grandson, Stefano Bloch is an author and professor in the University of Arizona School of Geography, Development and Environment.

Kalman's nephew, Lenny Heifetz, is a solo pianist in Central California. As of early 2024, Lenny has performed for nearly 6,000 concerts and events, including 600 weddings. Lenny's father, Emanuel Heifetz, noted violinist and educator at Cal Poly San Luis Obispo, was Frances Bloch's brother.
