= Michele Zukovsky =

Michele Zukovsky (née Bloch) is an American clarinetist and longest serving female woodwind player in the history of the Los Angeles Philharmonic Orchestra, serving from 1961 at the age of 18 until her retirement on December 20, 2015.

Since ending her decade's-long tenure with USC Thornton School of Music in 2017, Zukovsky has served as an applied faculty member at Azusa Pacific University School of Music in California.

== Background ==
Born and raised in the Los Feliz and Franklin Hills neighborhood of Los Angeles, she played alongside and later succeeded her father, Kalman Bloch, as the principal clarinetist of the L.A. Philharmonic.

Her brother Gregory Bloch (deceased 1988) played violin and mandolin for the Italian rock band Premiata Forneria Marconi (PFM), the American progressive-rock bands String Cheese and It's a Beautiful Day, on "Gilda Live" on Broadway, and with the Saturday Night Live Band. Through Gregory, she is also the aunt of author, graffiti artist, academic, and urban theorist Stefano Bloch.

She is related through her mother Frances to famed violin virtuoso Jascha Heifetz.

== Career ==
Zukovsky has performed worldwide, including with the Boston Pops, the St. Petersburg String Quartet, the Lincoln Center Chamber Players, and at the Mostly Mozart Festival.

She premiered John Williams' Clarinet Concerto with the Boston Pops in 1991. In 1986, she premiered a version by Luciano Berio of the Sonata in F minor, Op. 120 #1, by Johannes Brahms, arranged for clarinet and orchestra under commission from the Los Angeles Philharmonic Orchestra.

As a recording artist, Zukovsky has released several works, including the most recent Simeon Bellison: The Arrangements for Clarinet (Summit Records, 2008), a compilation recording that includes arrangements by the Russian-American Simeon Bellison and Jewish-themed works by other composers.

As a film industry studio clarinetist, Zukovsky played of several films scored by John Williams.

She served on the faculty of the University of California, Los Angeles, University of Southern California, California Institute of the Arts, Citrus College, and the Pasadena Conservatory of Music.
