= Bimini Baths =

Los Angeles natatorium (1903–1951)

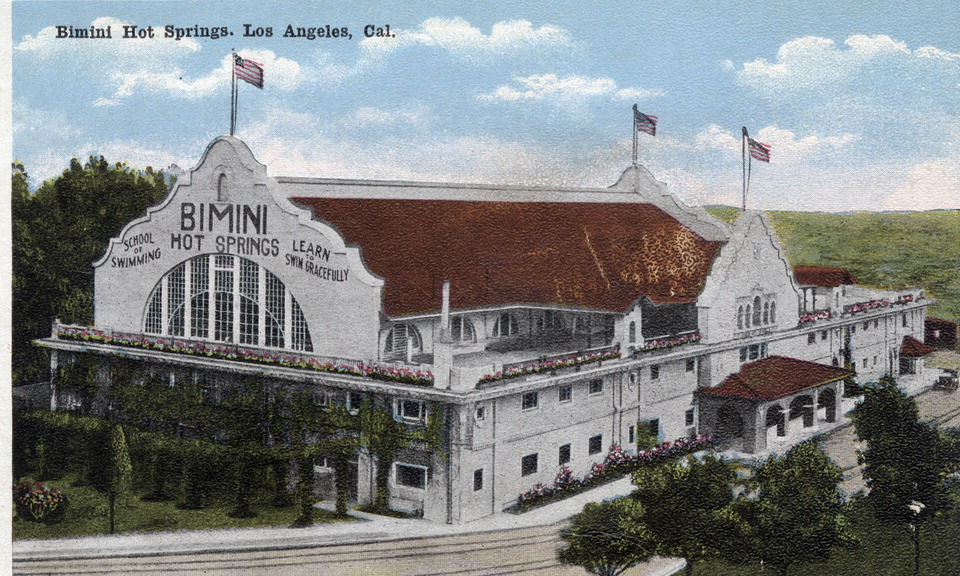
- An exterior view of the Bimini Hot Springs building, circa 1920
- Interactive map of Bimini Baths
- Coordinates: 34.0704°N 118.2898°W
- Discharge: 380 liters/minute
- Temperature: 40 °C (104 °F)
- Depth: 354 metres (1,161 ft)

Bimini Baths (also, Bimini Hot Springs and Sanitarium; currently Bimini Slough Ecology Park) was a geothermal mineral water public bathhouse and plunge in what is now Koreatown, Los Angeles, California, US. It was situated just west of downtown, near Third Street and Vermont Avenue. Bimini Baths contained a natatorium, swimming pools, swimming plunge, Victorian Turkish baths, a medical treatment department, and bottling works.

== History ==
In the 19th century, the area was a 45 acres (18 ha) marsh with 104 °F (40 °C) natural hot springs. The waters were discovered during oil drilling exploration. They were discovered by a man who was boring for oil at a depth of 1,750 feet (530 m) under 3 feet (0.91 m) of solid white marble. Named after the Bahamian island of Bimini, the venue was owned and operated by Dr. David W. Edwards, president and treasurer of the Bimini Water Company; and David W. Edwards, Jr. served as vice president and secretary. The company was founded December 31, 1902. In 1903, the bath house opened. In the following year, Bimini Hotel was built across the street, and the spring waters were pumped to it. In 1917, J. J. Warrick was manager of the baths and sanitarium. An outdoor pool was added to the baths in 1921. "... Mexicans were only allowed in on the day before the water in the pool was going to be changed, when it was too dirty for whites to swim in."

Besides the baths, the Bimini Water Company delivered plain and carbonated water to Los Angeles residents. The company provided the water prior to 1915 when the city mains installation occurred. The business went bankrupt in 1951 and the buildings were demolished in 1956.

In the present day, the springs area has become Bimini Slough Ecology Park, featuring native plant stands and a creekbed. The hotel has become headquarters for the Mary Lind Foundation.

== Hot springs ==
The well was reported to yield 100 gallons a minute of water at a temperature of 104 °F. The primary alkalinity of the water gave it a peculiar soft feeling that led to the nickname, "the velvet baths." The well was drilled 1,750 feet (530 m) deep in Tertiary age sediments that make up the oil formation in this locale. Containing no sulphur, it carries a large quantity of sodium carbonate and sodium chloride, with some potassium chloride, magnesium carbonate, iron, alumina, and free carbonic acid.

== Architecture and fittings ==
The large wooden building contained a 50-yard main pool, a separate pool for women, and other private pools. In addition, the venue had a cafe, pool observation balcony, and 500 dressing rooms. The original building was destroyed in 1905 during a fire. It was rebuilt in 1906 in Mission revival style by a design of Thornton Fitzhugh. The new construction featured a Turkish Bath, additional pools, and rooftop gardens. The bathing resort also featured a sanitarium. Tub baths and three large swimming plunges were available for the public. A sanitarium hotel nearby was under the same management. The bathhouse was located across the Palomar Ballroom, a popular venue of the big band era.

== Arroyo de la Sacatela and Bimini Slough ==
A tributary of Ballona Creek called Arroyo de la Sacatela once came down from Franklin Hills before feeding into Bimini Slough near what is now the L.A. Eco-Village. Bimini Slough was a historic wetland located along what is now Vermont Avenue, roughly bounded by 1st Street and Wilshire Boulevard on the north and south, and Berendo and Virgil on the west and east. The lowland that supported Bimini Slough was filled with soil in 1931 to make way for a new housing development.

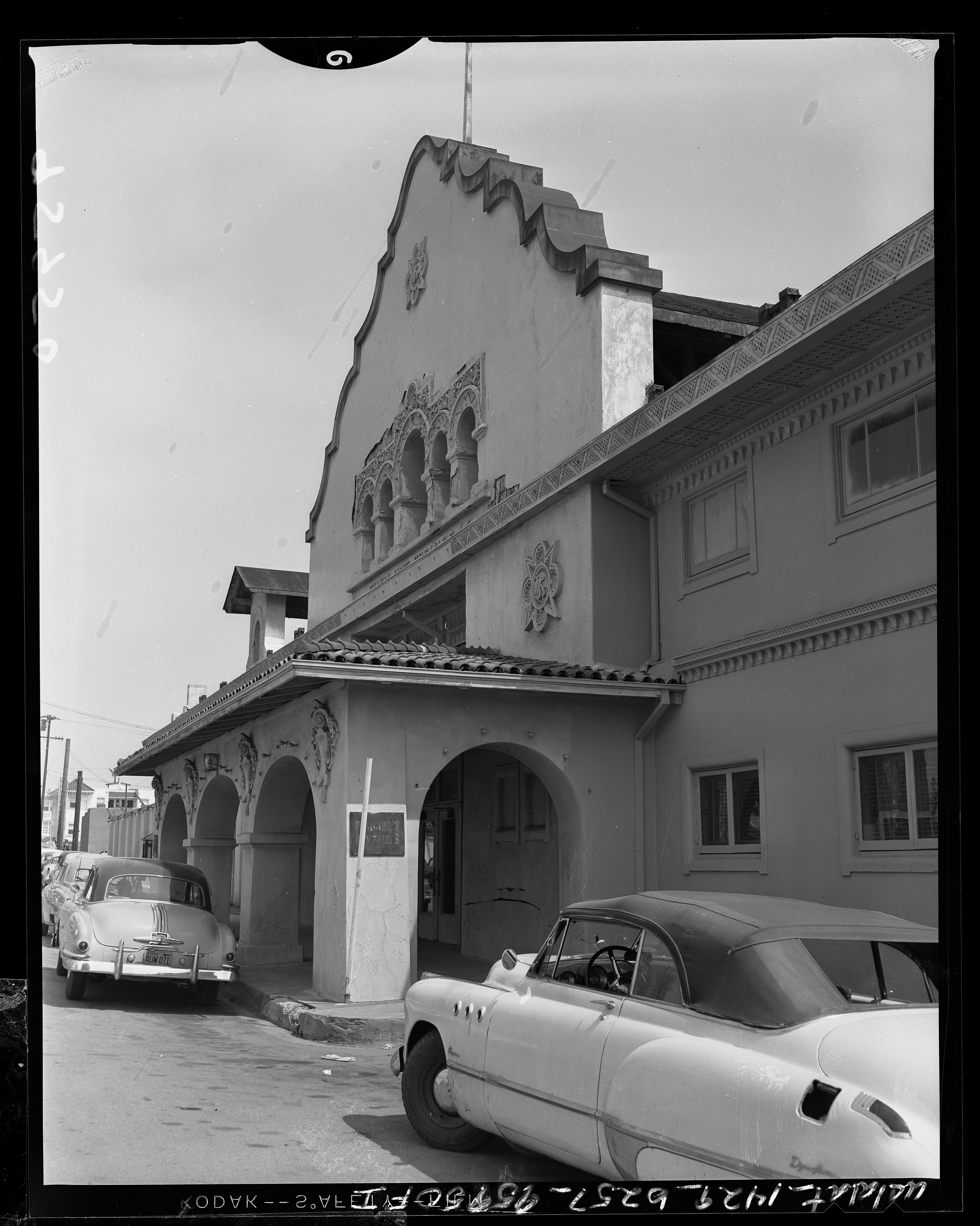
"Know Your City No. 141: Entrance and façade of old Bimini Hot Springs and Bath" photo from the Los Angeles Times, April 7, 1956 (UCLA Library)

== See also ==
- Beverly Hot Springs – Thermal springs in Los Angeles, California
- Radium Sulphur Springs – Los Angeles, California geothermal spa
- Alvarado Hot Springs – Defunct water source in California
- Seminole Hot Springs – Unincorporated community in California, United States
