= Franklin Hills, Los Angeles =

Franklin Hills
- Neighborhood of Los Angeles
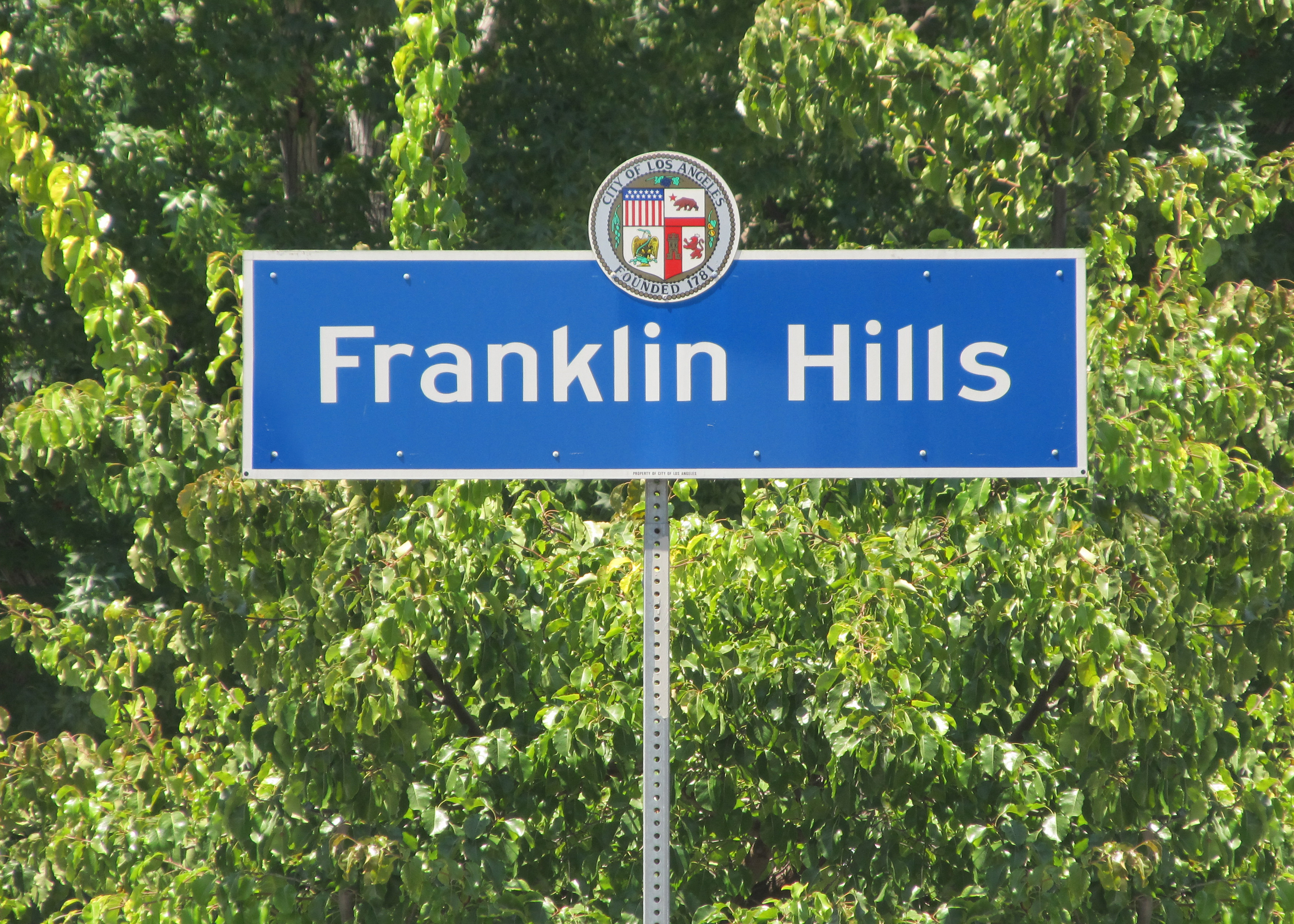
- Franklin Hills neighborhood sign located on St. George Street at Tracy Street

- Location in Northeast Los Angeles
- Coordinates: 34°06′25″N 118°16′37″W
- Country: United States
- State: California
- County: Los Angeles
- City: Los Angeles
- Time zone: UTC-8 (PST)
  - Summer (DST): UTC-7 (PDT)
- ZIP Code: 90027
- Area codes: 323

Franklin Hills is a neighborhood in central Los Angeles, California. It is home to one Los Angeles Historic-Cultural Monument.

== History ==
Franklin Hills is a residential neighborhood, set in the hills east of Los Feliz Village. The Los Angeles Times described it as a "diverse community" with a "collage of architectural styles".

Franklin Hills is home to the Shakespeare Bridge. The ravine over which the bridge crosses was once a perennial stream called Arroyo de la Sacatela. To the east of the bridge is the Franklin Hills public stairway system, which provides pedestrian linkages among the curvy streets, a series of 14 staircases originally built in the 1920s to provide hillside homeowners pedestrian access to the trolley lines below.

Prospect Studios is on Talmadge Street. Opened in 1915 as the Vitagraph Studio, the lot later became the Warner Brothers Studios East Hollywood Annex, then home of the ABC Television Center and local affiliate KABC, finally becoming part of the Walt Disney Company in 1996.

Brothers Roy and Walt Disney both owned homes at the corner of Lyric Avenue and St. George Street during the late 1920s so that they could walk to their new animation studio, located a few blocks away at 2719 Hyperion Avenue (at the intersection of Hyperion and Griffith Park Boulevard).

== Geography ==
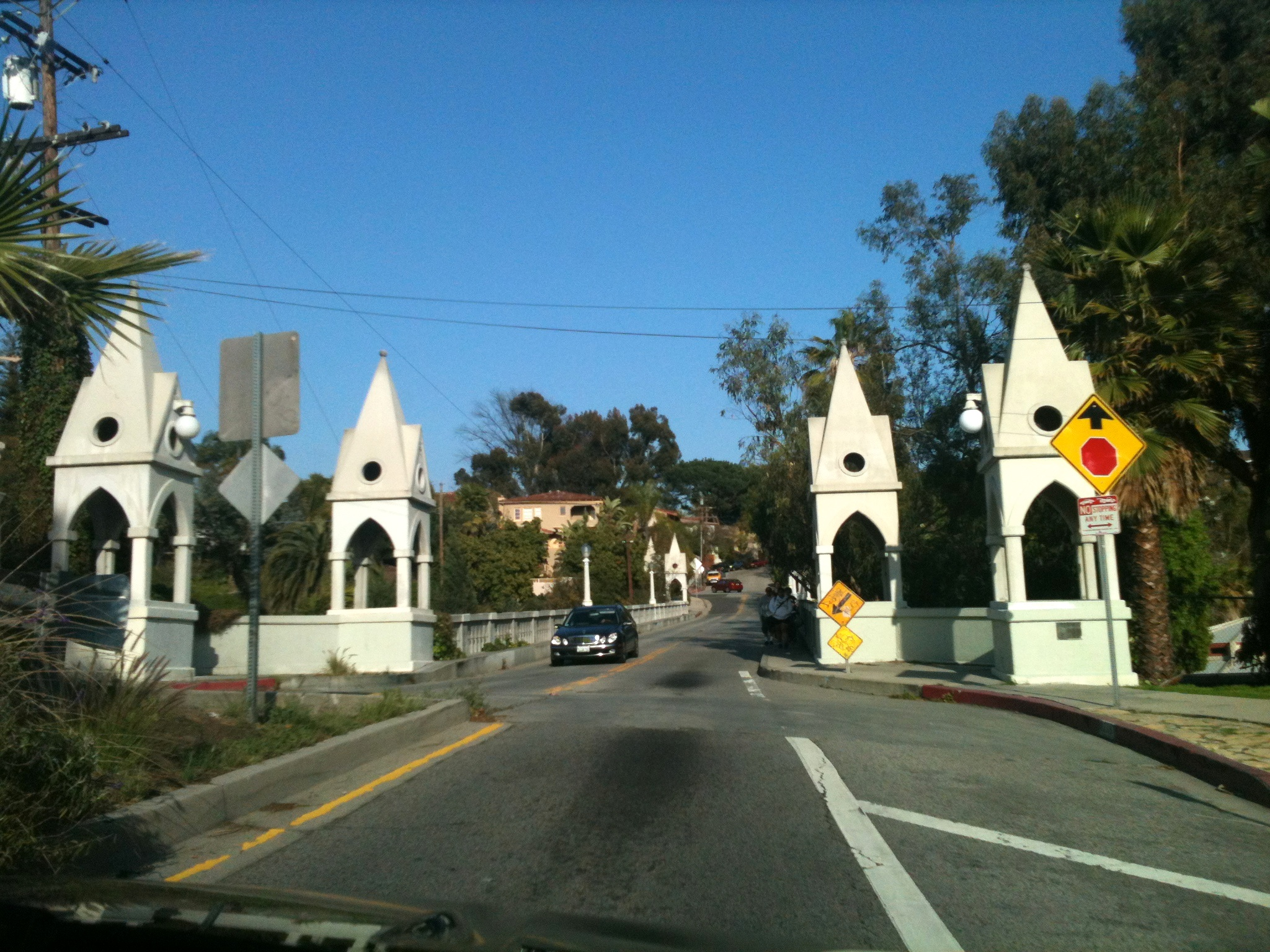
Shakespeare Bridge on Franklin Avenue

Franklin Hills is bounded on the north by Franklin Avenue and St. George Street, on the west by Talmadege Street, on the south by Fountain Avenue, and on the east by Tracy Street and Hyperion Avenue.

Franklin Hills is bordered by Los Feliz Village on the west, Silver Lake on the east, and East Hollywood on the south.

== Landmarks and attractions ==
- Shakespeare Bridge - Los Angeles Historic-Cultural Monument #126
- Prospect Studios - 4151 Prospect Avenue

== Government ==
Franklin Hills is within the Los Feliz Neighborhood Council. Section E comprises Franklin Hills and a few neighboring blocks on the west.

== Education ==
There is one public school within the Franklin Hills boundaries:

- Thomas Starr King Middle School - 4201 Fountain Avenue

== Parks and recreation ==
- Franklin Hills Community Garden

== Notable residents ==
- Kalman Bloch, clarinetist
- Roy O. Disney
- Walt Disney
- Kim Gordon, musician
- Joseph Gordon-Levitt, actor
- Zoe Saldaña, actor
- Joey Waronker, drummer
- Kristen Wiig, actor
- Trevor Moore, comedian
- Michele Zukovsky, clarinetist
