= Wheeler Springs, California =

Unincorporated community in California, United States

- Unincorporated community
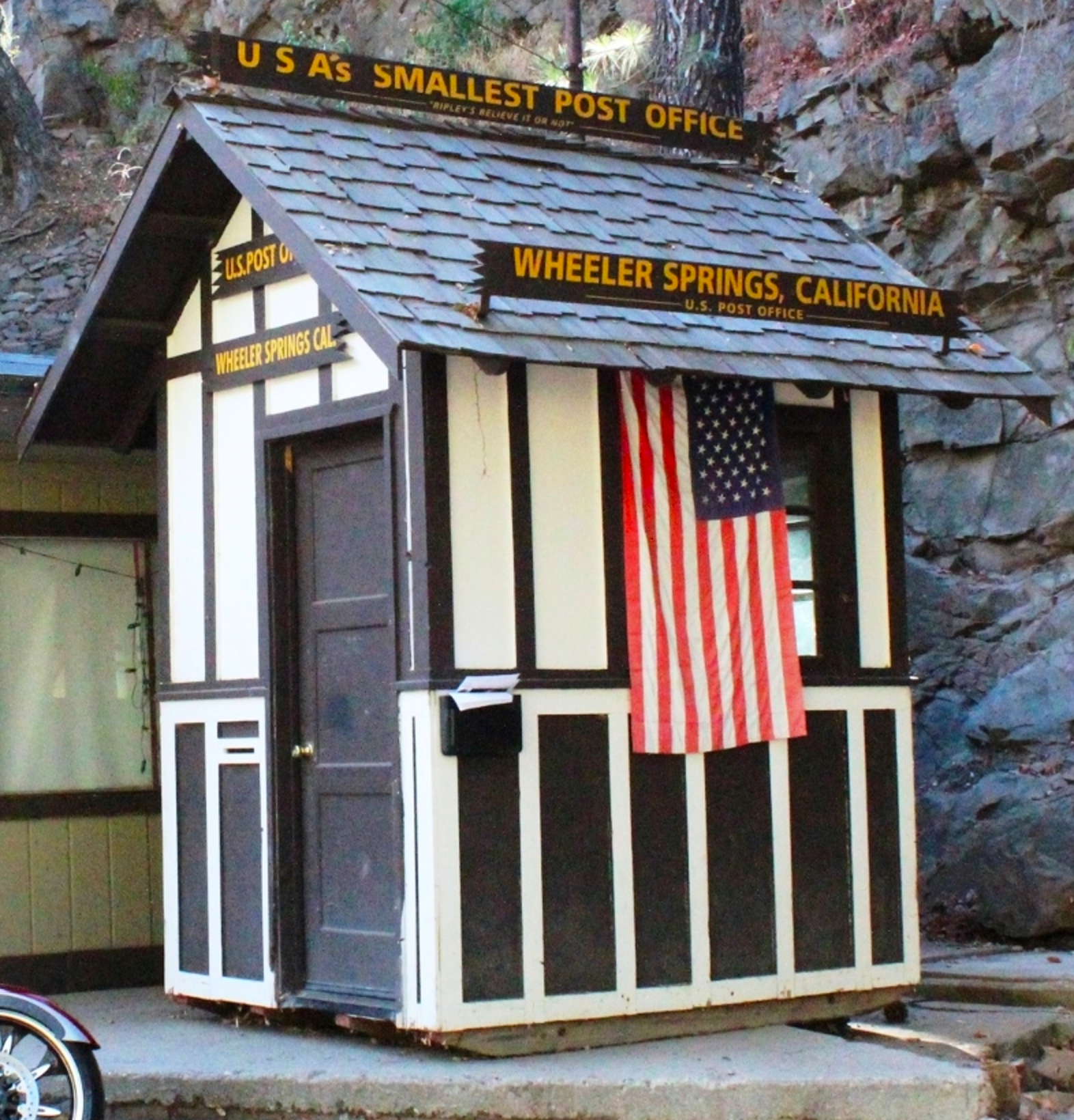
- Wheeler Springs is home to America's smallest post office

- Location within California Location within the United States
- Coordinates: 34°30′29″N 119°17′29″W
- Country: United States
- State: California
- County: Ventura
- Elevation: 1,486 ft (453 m)

Population (1980)
  - Total: 50
- Time zone: UTC-8 (Pacific (PST))
  - Summer (DST): UTC-7 (PDT)
- ZIP Code: 93023
- Area code: 805
- GNIS feature ID: 254391

Wheeler Hot Springs
- Interactive map of Wheeler Hot Springs
- Type: geothermal
- Discharge: 133 liters/minute
- Temperature: 39 °C (102 °F)

Wheeler Springs is an unincorporated community that grew around a set of sulphurated hot springs in Ventura County, California, United States. It is located six miles north of the Ojai Valley, within Los Padres National Forest and is named for Wheeler Blumberg, who founded the town in 1891, and the many natural hot springs.

Wheeler Springs is most known for its former resort, natural hot springs and for being home to the smallest post office in the U.S. It is also where TV personality Art Linkletter opened the theme park Kiddyland Park. Wheeler Springs is home to numerous campgrounds, including Wheeler Gorge Campground by Matilija Creek, as well as multiple hiking trails and open-space nature areas.

== Etymology ==
Wheeler Springs is named for Wheeler C. Blumberg, who acquired government land surrounding the hot springs. Blumberg discovered the hot springs here in 1890 when he was out on a hunting trip. He shot a deer which fell into a ravine. When Blumberg climbed into the canyon, he discovered hot sulphur springs and cold mountain water springs.

== History ==
Sisxulkuy is on the right side of the map in the Ventureño region

The first people to inhabit Wheeler Springs was the Chumash. during the Mission period, Wheeler Springs was home to a Chumash village known as Sisxulkuy. It is often assumed that hot springs in Wheeler Springs were sacred to the Chumash people, although there are no archeological evidence to confirm this.

=== Resort ===
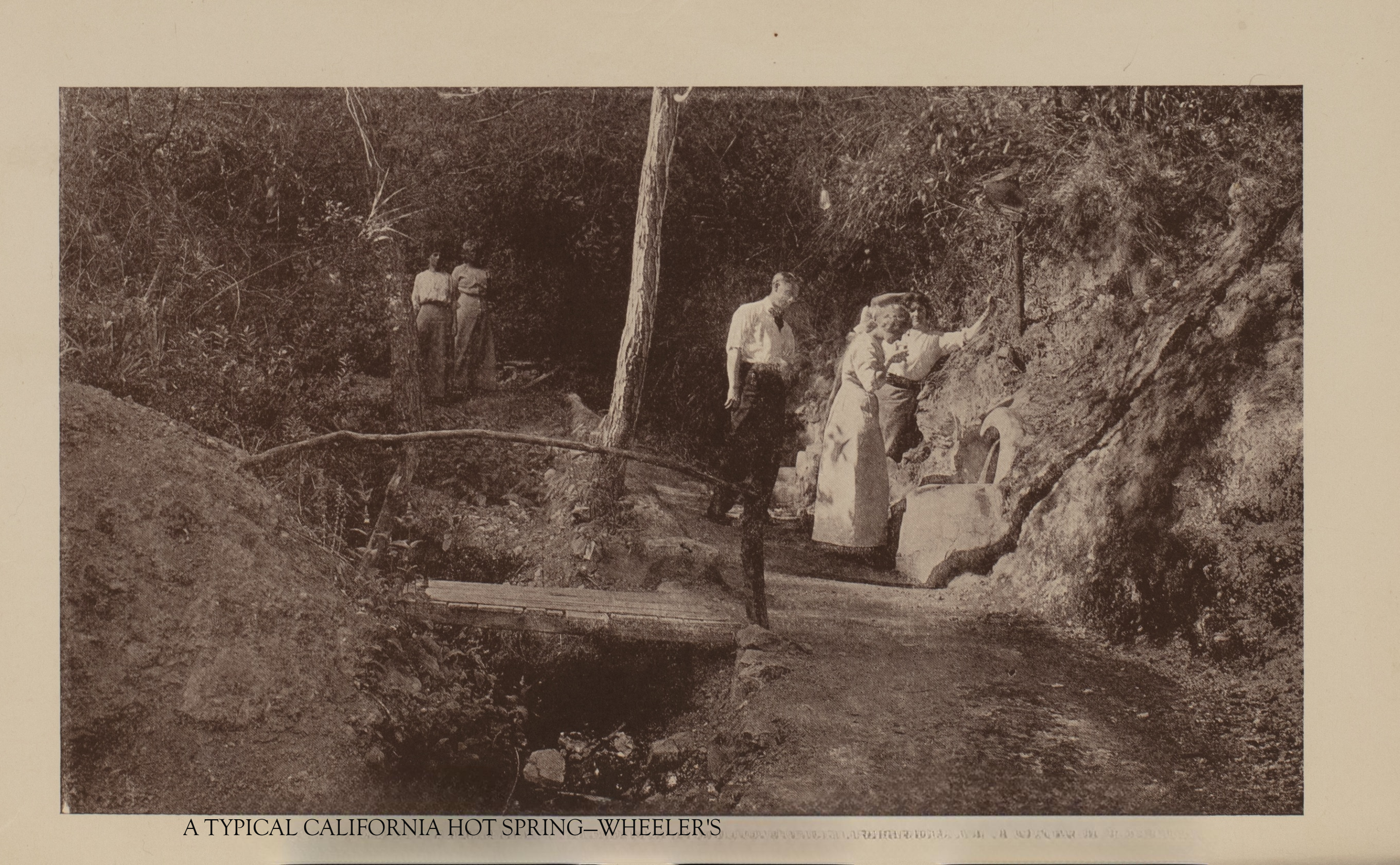
"A typical California hot spring—Wheeler's" (1916)

The Wheeler's Hot Springs resort is located in Wheeler Springs. The founder of the resort, Wheeler Blumberg, established the resort in 1891. It had 14 rental cabins, a swimming pool, bar, and more. In May, 1907, Blumberg locked himself in a room and began shooting through the walls. Blumberg was arrested by a posse and placed in a straitjacket and a padded cell in Ventura. He died the following day at age 43. Webb Wilcox, Blumberg's son-in-law, became the new owner and renamed it Wheeler Hot Springs. California government geologists reported in 1917:

A group of three warm springs flows out of clay banks on both sides of the creek. The larger of the three, consisting of about 11 small springs within a radius of a few feet, has a temperature of 100 °F (38 °C) and flows about 35 US gallons (130 L; 29 imp gal) per minute. This is piped to a swimming tank. The other two springs (Bucket Spring and Genoveva Spring) have temperatures of 62 °F (17 °C) and 75 °F (24 °C) respectively, each flowing about 2 US gallons (7.6 L; 1.7 imp gal) per minute. They are used for drinking purposes. A resort has been conducted here since 1890, open throughout the year, with hotel and cottage accommodations for several hundred people. Electric lights are supplied by a 25-h.p. motor run by a small water-power plant.

The resort operated throughout the 1900s, but closed in 1997. It offered fishing, hunting, swimming, camping, trail riding and dancing and was often visited by Johnny Cash during the 1960s, when Cash resided in nearby Casitas Springs.

There was also a Wheeler Cold Springs, circa 1915, located in Sespe Canyon, that offered seasonal accommodations for hunters and fishermen.

=== Post office ===
Wheeler Springs Post Office was established by Webb Wilcox next door to Webb Wilcox Cafe in the mid-1930s. The shack, no larger than a phone booth, was designated by Ripley's Believe it or Not as the smallest post office in America. It was opened after the completion of the Maricopa Highway, which connected the Ojai Valley to the town of Maricopa in Kern County. The community lost its post office status in 1962. The post office was located at 16850 Maricopa Highway. It burned down in December 2017 during the Thomas Fire. The Wheeler Springs Post Office has been rebuilt as of March 2026.

== Geography ==
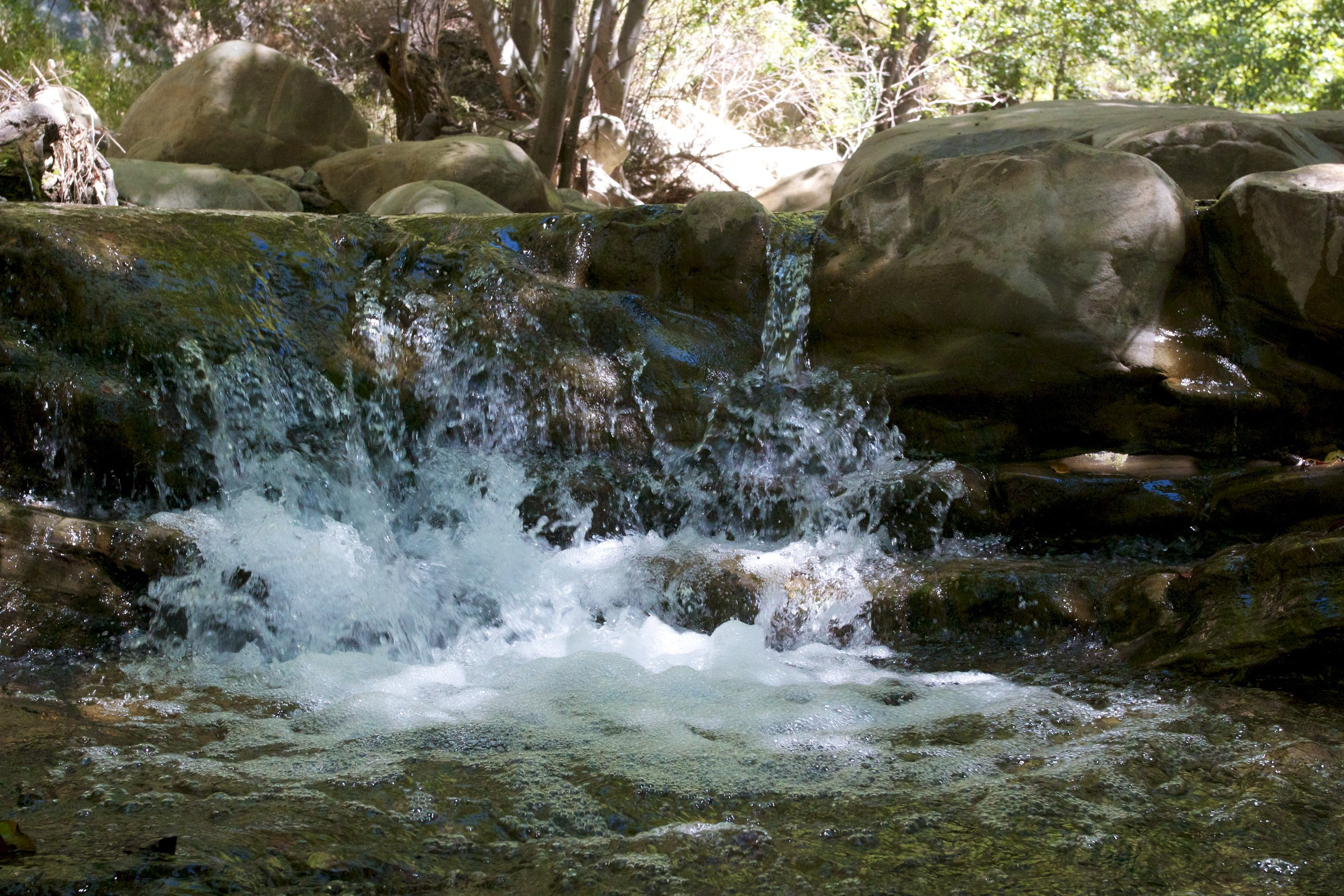
Matilija Falls in nearby Ojala.

Wheeler Springs is located 5.5 miles north of the Ojai Valley and is situated within Los Padres National Forest. It is located next to Maricopa Highway. Tall mountain peaks, including Nordhoff Ridge, border the village in all directions. It is a mountain community which sits along the North Fork of Matilija Creek. During rainy winters, a waterfall near the highway splashes down into the creek. Creekbeds which cross the highway may contain deep water, making crossing difficult.

The community is situated north of the Topatopa Mountains, east of the Santa Ynez Mountains, and south of the San Rafael Mountains. There are natural mineral water springs, both hot and cold. The hot springs have a temperature of 102 °F (39 °C).

Wheeler Springs is in a rugged, mountainous landscape surrounded by giant oak trees. It is located 100 miles from Los Angeles, 19 miles north of Ventura and 7 miles north of Ojai. California State Route 33 (Maricopa Highway) passes through the village.

=== Geology ===
Wheeler Springs is located in a narrow, deeply incised canyon known as Wheeler Gorge, which is eroded by the North Fork of Matilija Creek and cuts through the Santa Ynez-Topatopa Range in northern Ventura County. The canyon is so narrow that three tunnels and an additional three bridges had to be constructed for Maricopa Highway to be built. The North Fork of Matilija Creek joins the main river (Matilija Creek) just south of Wheeler Springs in nearby Ojala, California. From Ojala it drains southward via the Ventura River to the coast.

== Recreation ==
Wheeler Springs is home to Wheeler Gorge Campground and a variety of hiking trails in the Los Padres National Forest.

=== Hiking Trails ===
- Wheeler Gorge Nature Trail: A 0.75-mile loop was built by the Youth Conservation Corps in 1979. The trail follows the North Fork of the Matilija Creek.
- North Matilija Trail: A 2.6-mile roundtrip loop to nearby Matilija Campground. It ascends the Upper North Fork of Marilija Creek and passes through four nearby campgrounds: Marilija, Middle Marilija, Upper Marilija and Maple.
