= Radium Sulphur Springs =

Los Angeles, California geothermal spa

- Hollywood Mineral Springs; California Mineral Springs
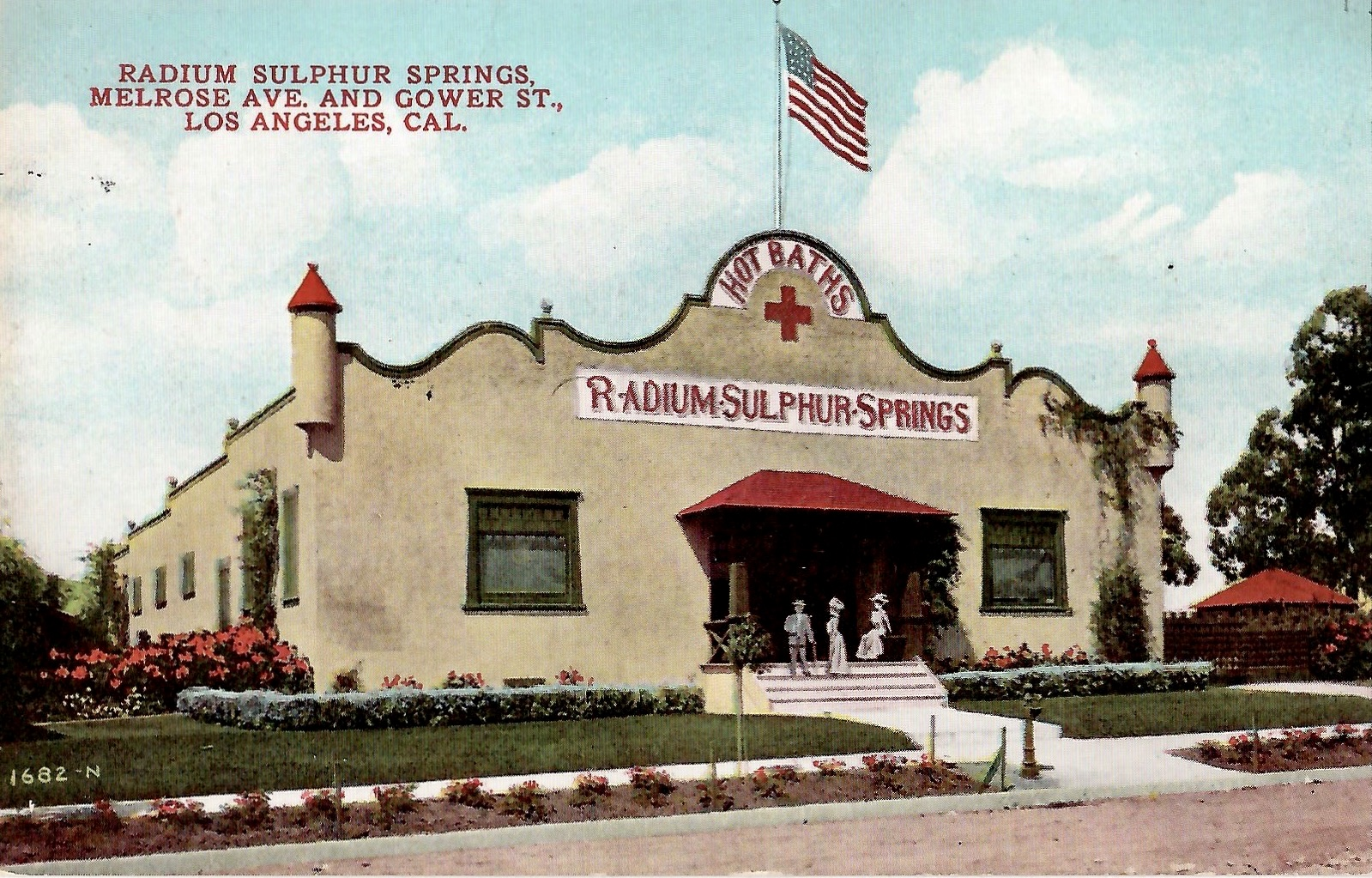
- Interactive map of Radium Sulphur Springs
- Location: 5625 Melrose Ave, Los Angeles, CA 90038
- Coordinates: 34.0835°N 118.3231°W
- Spring source: Oil test well
- Elevation: ?
- Type: Geothermal
- Temperature: 93 °F (34 °C)
- Depth: 1,500 feet (460 m)

Radium Sulphur Springs, located on the north side of Melrose Avenue between Larchmont and Gower Street in Los Angeles, California, U.S., was an early-20th-century hot spring that resulted from an unsuccessful attempt to drill 1,500 feet (460 m) for oil. "Discovered" in 1905 and opened as a spa by G. P. Gehring in 1908, the owners claimed that the water was radioactive, germicidal, and blood purifying. The supposed radioactivity of water was advertised as "liquid sunshine" and was part of the larger radium fad of the early 20th century. The spa was located in Colegrove, an electric-railway stop and associated community just south of Hollywood.

== History ==
In 1915, a U.S. government geologist reported that the spring's water temperature was 34 °C (93 °F) and that the water had measurable levels of calcium, carbonate, phosphate, magnesium, potassium, sodium, and sulfate. The same year, owners claimed the waters were "wonderfully curative" for diseases and disorders from catarrh to neurasthenia. The spring water was also bottled and sold for drinking.

The name changed to Hollywood Mineral Springs in 1924. In 1926, the street address was 5625 Melrose, near Larchmont, and the phone number was GLadstone 2149. Services offered 1928 included "mineral Roman tub, mineral steam, marathon bath, mineral colonic, mineral Scotch douche and massage by a graduate. Baths open from 9 a.m. to 11 p.m." The spa endured until around 1929 when the Great Depression and the death of the owner shut down the business.

The site reopened as California Mineral Springs briefly in the late 1950s. Circa 1968, the California Department of Water Resources reported that the spa was owned by Mr. Harold Brooks, and the source was an test well, probably drilled in 1905, and while the well had once flowed the "water level [has] declined below land surface and well is now is pumped". The well has reportedly been capped off.

== Additional images ==
Radium Sulphur Springs, Los Angeles
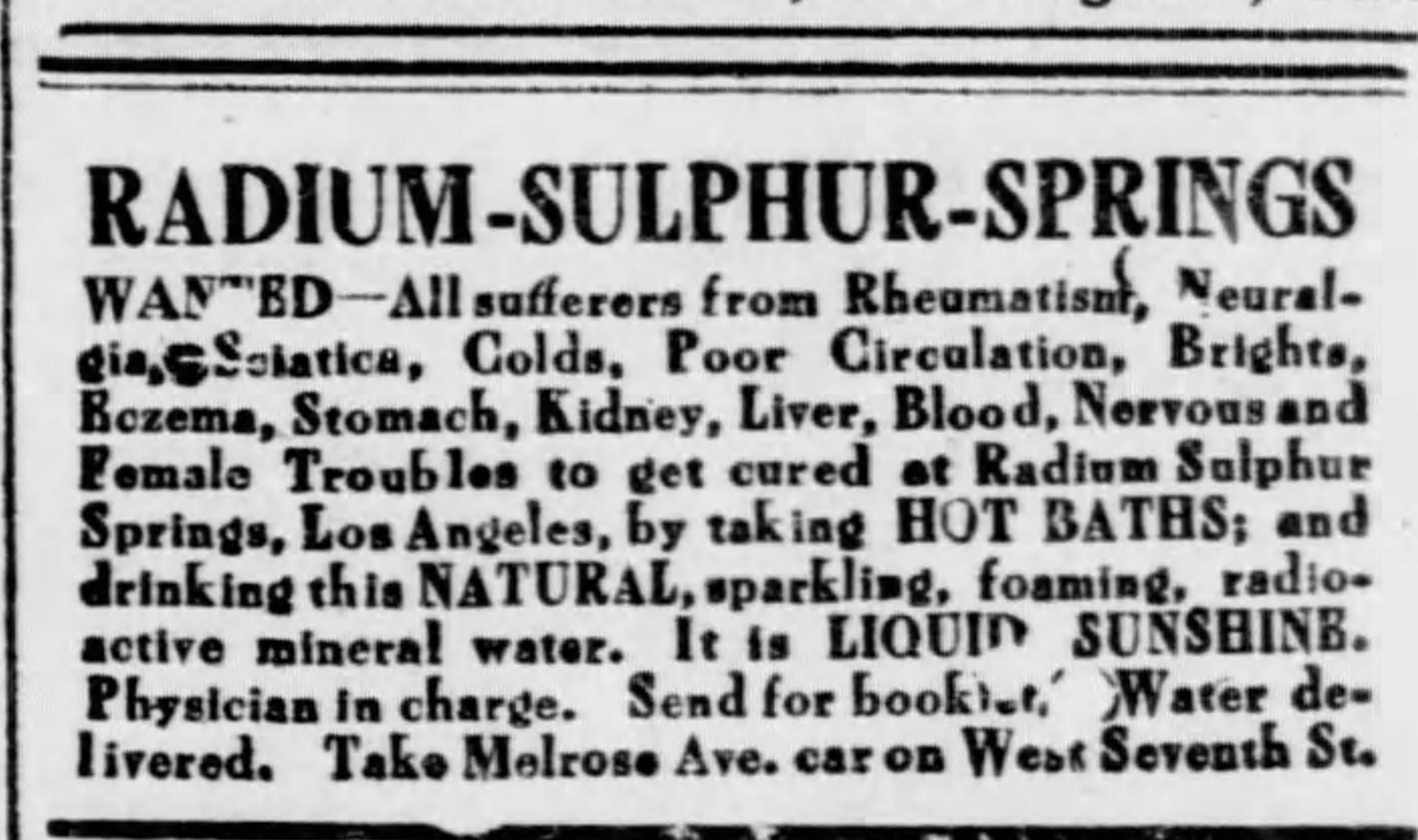
"Radium Sulphur Springs" (Imperial Valley Press, June 7, 1912)

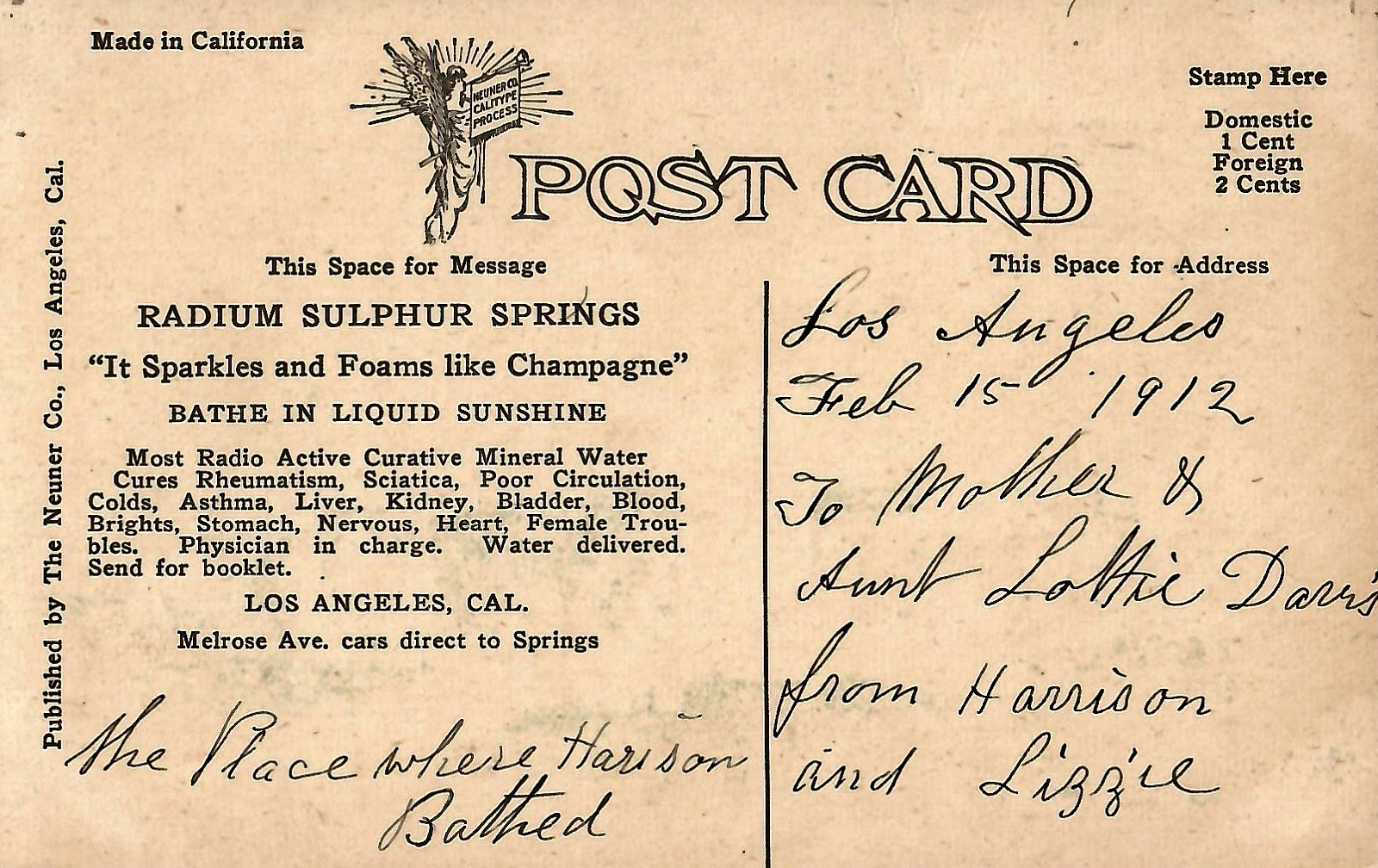
Radium Sulphur Springs - Melrose Ave. and Gower St., Los Angeles, Calif.

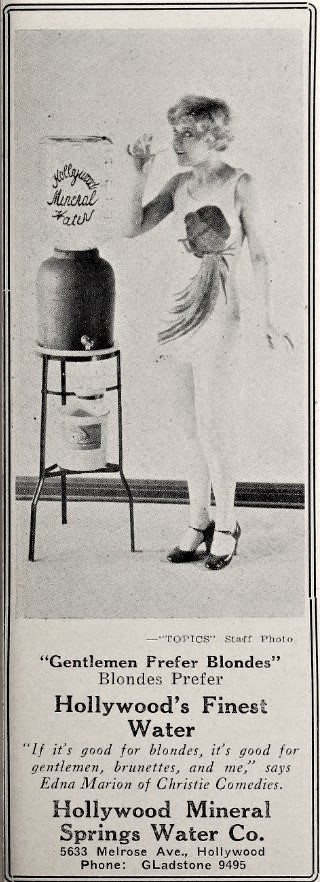
Edna Marion of Christie Comedies endorses Hollywood Mineral Water in January 1927

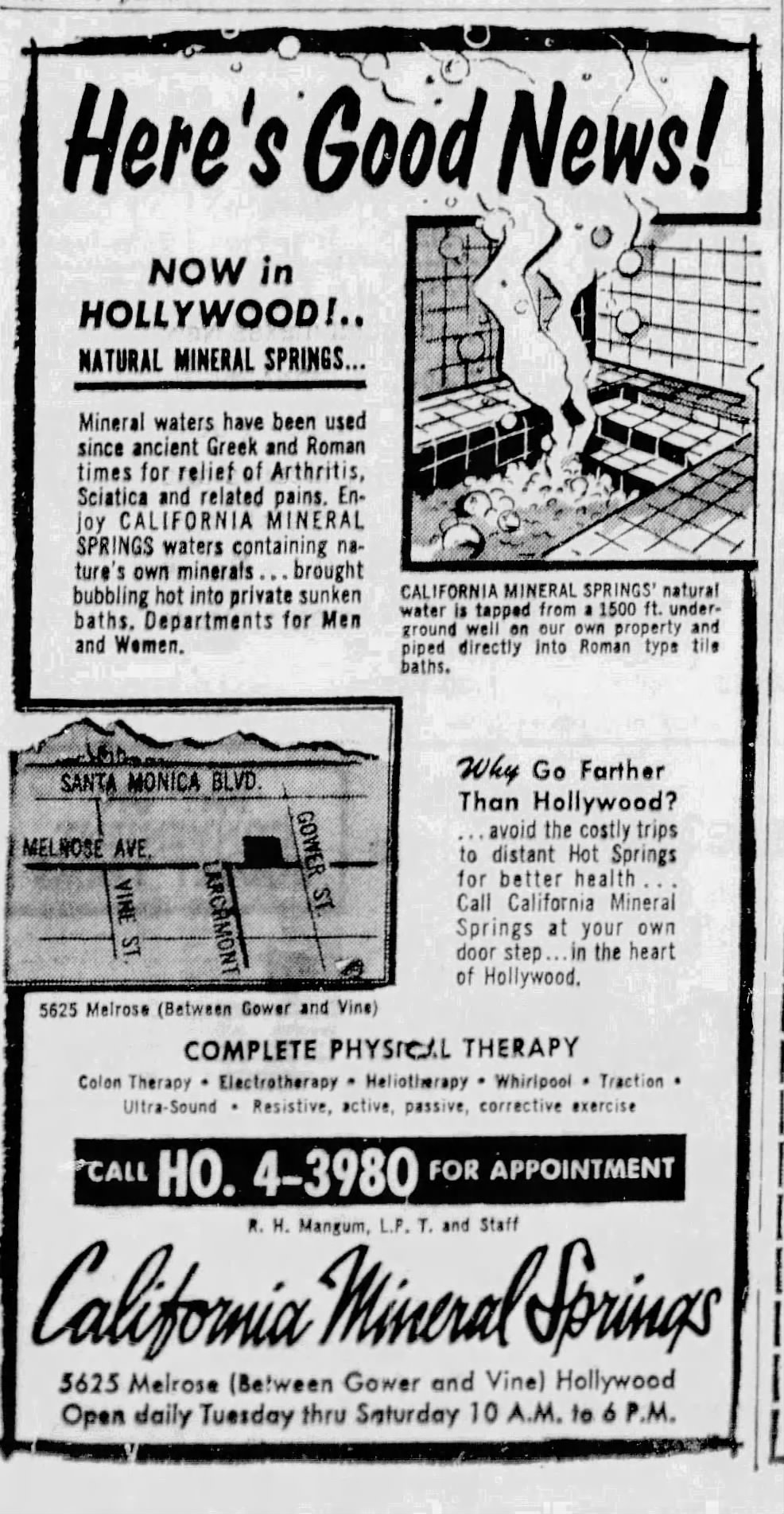
"Here's Good News!" (Valley Times, September 30, 1958)

== See also ==
- Radioactive quackery
- Bimini Baths
- Tongva Sacred Springs
- South Hollywood–Sherman Line
- R (Los Angeles Railway)
- Salt Lake Oil Field – Oil field under Los Angeles, California, United States
