= Jason Alder =

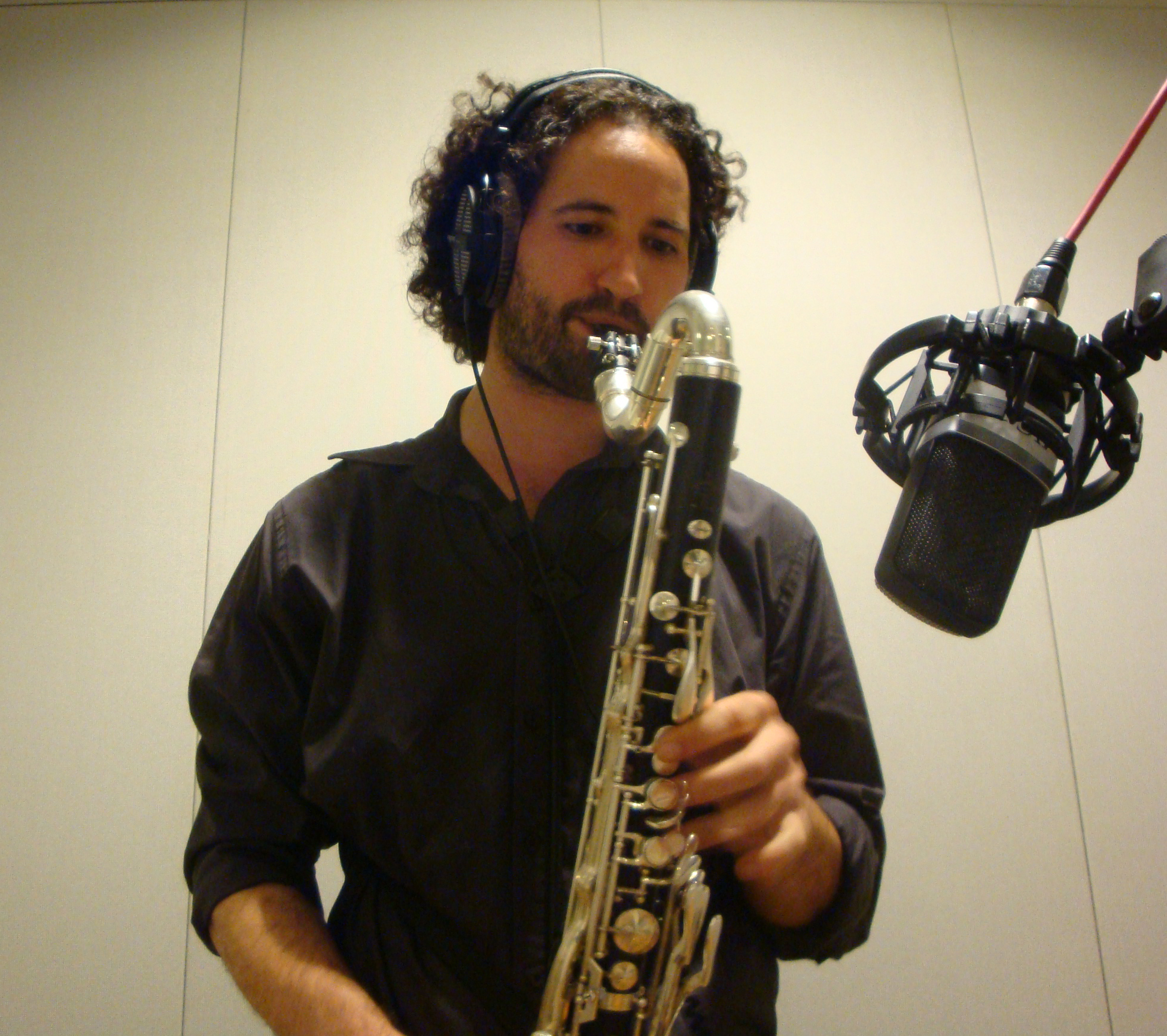

Background information
- Born: Livonia, Michigan, U.S.
- Genres: Contemporary classical, jazz, world, electroacoustic, experimental, free improvisation
- Occupation: Musician
- Instruments: Clarinet, saxophone
- Formerly of: Payazen! Klezmer Band, Shadanga Duo, Sonido 13, JORO, Spinfist
- Website: www.jasonalder.com

Jason Alder is an American-born clarinetist, bass clarinetist, and saxophonist. He is best known for his work in contemporary music, free improvisation, and electro-acoustic music.

== Biography ==
Alder grew up in Westland, a suburb of Detroit, and performed with the Michigan Youth Band at the University of Michigan in Ann Arbor while in high school. He holds a degree in music from Michigan State University, where he studied clarinet with Frank Ell. In 2006 he moved to Amsterdam, Netherlands, to study bass clarinet at the Conservatorium van Amsterdam with Erik van Deuren, where he obtained a second degree. He received an MMus from the Artez Conservatorium in Arnhem, Netherlands, studying free improvisation in the New Dutch Swing program with saxophonist and bass clarinetist Frank Gratkowski and double bassist Wilbert de Joode. In 2017 he began a PhD program at the Royal Northern College of Music in Manchester, UK researching the contrabass clarinet. His other teachers have included Richard Hawkins, Kimberly Cole, Yaniv Nachum, Michael Lowenstern, David Krakauer, Ernesto Molinari, and Claudio Puntin.

Alder specializes in contemporary classical music and working with electronics. In 2010 he created a Max/MSP patch to perform Karlheinz Stockhausen's "Solo für melodieinstrument und Rückkopplung" using only a computer in place of the 6 reel-to-reel tape machines and 4 assistants originally required to perform the piece. Alder has also worked with composers to develop electronics for their compositions. In 2013 he collaborated with Robert Ratcliffe on his piece "Wake up Call", originally for bass clarinet and fixed-medium electronic accompaniment. Alder created a Max/MSP patch which allowed for adding effects to the bass clarinet, as well as rearranging the sections of the piece, as is specified by Ratcliffe in the score. He has worked with and/or premiered pieces from a number of composers, including Christian Wolff, Stefan Prins, Gabriel Prokofiev, André Douw, Francisco Castillo Trigueros, Andys Skordis, Thanos Chrysakis, Rodrigo Tascón, Yu Oda, and Thanasis Deligiannis. He also performs with flutist Katalin Szanyi in the Shadanga Duo, which worked with composer Louis Aguirre and other members of the Danish composers group Snow Mask to commission and premiere new works. In 2018, he became the first person to play the contrabass clarinet in Cuba with a solo performance at the Havana Festival of Contemporary Music.

In addition to composed music, Alder is an improviser and has performed solo, in Sonido 13- an electroacoustic duo with saxophonist Harry Cherrin, and with other improvisers such as Tom Jackson and Alex Ward. In duo with Austrian vocalist Magdalena Hahnkamper as megalodon/na, he won the Lyrik Live prize from the Austrian radio station Ö1 for a free improvisation theater/performance art/video piece.

Alder also performs in jazz and world music bands such as the klezmer-jazz band Payazen!, gypsy punk band Victor Menace, afrobeat bands JORO and Matuki, with Bangladeshi/British singer Shapla Salique, and with the Balkan-jazz band Mimika. He has also studied karnatic music. In 2014 Alder toured with Idina Menzel and Rob Mounsey, and has played in other pop and rock bands such as The Lazlo Device, The Palumbo Phunk, Novack, Canvas Blanco, and RaskalBOMFukkerz. He played bass guitar in the bands Spinfist and June Ruin.

Alder has performed at festivals around the world, such as ClarinetFest, European Clarinet Festival, Istanbul Woodwind Festival, American Single Reed Summit, Gaudeamus Contemporary Music Festival, Ultima Oslo Contemporary Music Festival, Havana Festival of Contemporary Music, International Festival for Artistic Innovation, and the Ferrara Buskers Festival.

Alder has authored extended range quarter-tone fingering charts for both clarinet and bass clarinet.

In 2015 he became the editor of The Clarinet [Online] for the International Clarinet Association.

== Discography ==
- Ben Onono, Spell: Music from the Motion Picture (2020). Paramount Music. Clarinet, bass clarinet, contrabass clarinet flute.
- Jason Alder, Chris Cundy, Tim Hodgkinson, Heather Roche, Yoni Silver, Shadanga Duo, Music for Bass Clarinets (2019). Aural Terrains. Clarinet, alto clarinet, bass clarinet.
- Jason Alder & Piotr Michałowski, Contradictions: Duets for Contrabass and Contra-Alto Clarinets (2019). Creative Sources. Contrabass and Contra-alto clarinets.
- Jason Alder, Thanos Chrysakis, Caroline Kraabel, Yoni Silver, Music for Baritone Saxophone, Bass Clarinets & Electronics (2019). Aural Terrains. B♭, E♭, bass, contrabass clarinets.
- The Lazlo Device, You Stumble, I Fall (2018). Tenor saxophone, soprano saxophone, bass clarinet.
- Mimika Orchestra, Divinities of the Earth and the Waters (2018). PDV Records. Clarinet, baritone saxophone.
- Attila Gyarfas Trio, Cloud Factory (2018). Sinistra. Clarinet, bass clarinet.
- Jason Alder, Alex Ward, Tom Jackson Clarinet Trio, Tottenham Hale (2017). Roam Releases. Clarinet, bass clarinet, E♭ clarinet.
- Skronk, Skronk #28 (2017). Skronk Records. Contrabass clarinet.
- Noizemaschin!! London, Noizemaschin!! London #12 (2017). Bass clarinet.
- Apocalypse Jazz Unit, Crash Land: Three Live Performances (2017). Skronk Records. Clarinet.
- Noizemaschin!! London, Noizemaschin!! London #8 (2016). Bass clarinet.
- Skronk, Skronk #4 (2016). Skronk Records. Bass clarinet.
- Noizemaschin!! London, Noizemaschin!! London #3 (2016). Bass clarinet.
- Canvas Blanco, Call Me Lucky Fat or Skinny (2015). Room Service Music. Clarinet.
- RaaskalBOMFukkerz, Vlucht Witte Raven (2014). Toztizok Zoundz. Clarinet.
- Wouter Seinen, Paraplu (2013). Bass Clarinet
- The Pale Blue Dot Ensemble, The Pale Blue Dot (2013). Clarinet, bass clarinet.
- Payazen! Klezmer Band, Adain Chai (2011). Clarinet, bass clarinet.
- Payazen! Klezmer Band, Nesia Tova (2011). Clarinet, bass clarinet.
- Payazen! Klezmer Band, Where are My Keys??? (2011). Clarinet, bass clarinet.
- Sonido 13, Versorium (2009). Clarinet, bass clarinet, electronics.
- Payazen! Klezmer Band, Where are My Shoes??? (2009). Clarinet, bass clarinet.
- June Ruin, June Ruin (2004). Bass guitar.
- June Ruin, Register.Rock.Vote (Compilation) (2005). Bass guitar.
- Michigan State University Wind Symphony, Simple Gifts: The Music of Frank Ticheli, vol. 2 (2002). MarkMasters Label. Bass clarinet, contrabass clarinet.
- Spinfist, The Underground (Compilation) (2000). Vertigo Productions. Bass guitar.
- Spinfist, Bothered EP (2000). 2/1 Productions. Bass guitar.
- Spinfist, Loud & Local No Frills (Compilation) (1999). Epitaph Magazine. Bass guitar.
- Spinfist, Money is Power (1998). 2/1 Productions. Bass guitar.

Soundtracks

- Beren op de Weg (2014), Nadia Meezen. Short animation. Clarinet.
- Iliriana: Just When You Think It's Over, It Begins (2009), Ernest Meholli. Feature film. Clarinet.
