= Salique =

Salique may refer to:

== People ==
- Shapla Salique (born 1974), British singer

== See also ==
- Salian Franks, subgroup of the early Franks
- Salic law, major body of Frankish law during the Old Frankish Period
- Terra salica, legal term used in the Salian code
