= Dennis Smylie =

American musician

- Genres: Classical, contemporary classical
- Instruments: Bass clarinet
- Education: Juilliard School (BM, MM)

Dennis Smylie is an American bass clarinetist and professor, known particularly for his performances of contemporary classical music.

== Education ==
Smylie earned a Bachelor of Music and Master of Music from the Juilliard School, where he studied under Joseph Allard.

== Career ==
Smylie is a member of the Westchester Philharmonic, American Symphony Orchestra and the Brooklyn Philharmonic and performed with several other orchestras including the New York Philharmonic, the Metropolitan Opera, the New York City Ballet and New York City Opera, the Buffalo Philharmonic, Orpheus Chamber Orchestra, the Chamber Music Society of Lincoln Center, the Saint Louis Symphony Orchestra and Montreal Symphony Orchestra, and Speculum Musicae.

Smylie was the bass clarinet soloist in the premiere performance and recording of Donald Martino's Triple Concerto. He was judge at the first World Bass Clarinet Convention, and performed there alongside Josef Horák. He has given recitals and presentations at Juilliard, Oberlin College, Yale University, Princeton University, Kent State University, Florida State University, and the University of Washington in Seattle, as well as in Salida, Aspen, Weill Recital Hall, Symphony Space in New York City, and the Cleveland Museum of Art. Smylie is an artist-faculty member of the Aspen Music School, a visiting specialist at Montclair State University, and has recorded for Deutsche Grammophon, Nonesuch, New World Records, CRI, RCA and Virgin Classics.
