= Harry Sparnaay =

Dutch bass clarinetist, composer, and teacher

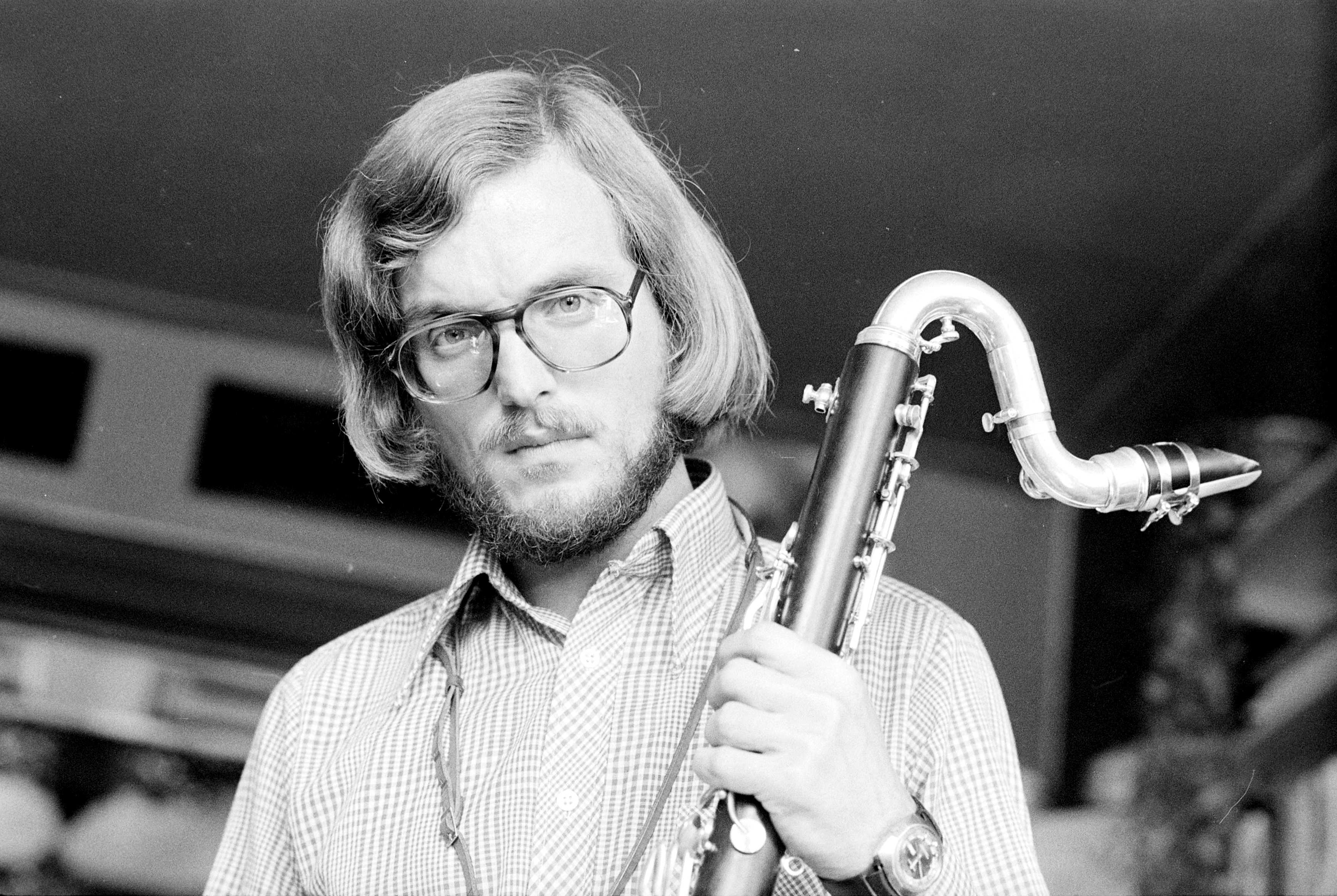
- Sparnaay in 1975

Background information
- Born: 14 April 1944 (age 82); Amsterdam, Netherlands
- Died: 12 December 2017 (aged 73) Lloret de Mar, Girona, Spain
- Occupations: Musician; composer; educator
- Instrument: Bass clarinet
- Award: Knight of the Order of the Netherlands Lion
- Education: Conservatorium van Amsterdam

Harry Sparnaay (14 April 1944 in Amsterdam – 12 December 2017 in Lloret de Mar, Girona, Spain) was a noted Dutch bass clarinetist, composer, and teacher.

== Biography ==
Harry Sparnaay studied with Ru Otto at the Conservatorium van Amsterdam, graduating with a performer's degree in clarinet before specializing in bass clarinet. In 1972, he became the first bass clarinetist to win first prize at the Gaudeamus International Interpreters Competition.

He performed solo at numerous important music festivals including in New York, Los Angeles, Madrid, Paris, Athens, Zagreb, Warsaw, and at the Holland Festival and several ISCM festivals. Other festivals at which Sparnaay has performed include Witten, Aarhus, Como, Bolzano, Naples, Torino, Bourges, Middelburg, Graz, Salzburg, Huddersfield, Saarbrücken, Royan, and Houston.

Sparnaay was a featured performer with many major orchestras and ensembles, including the ASKO Ensemble, BBC Symphony Orchestra, Berlin Radio Symphony Orchestra, Concertgebouw Orchestra, Ensemble intercontemporain, Melbourne Symphony, Pittsburgh New Music Ensemble, Netherlands Radio Chamber Philharmonic, Radio Filharmonisch Orkest, Residentie Orchestra, Rotterdam Philharmonic, Schönberg Ensemble, and Seymour Group, and appeared with leading conductors, including Luciano Berio, Riccardo Chailly, Richard Dufallo, Péter Eötvös, Reinbert de Leeuw, Diego Masson, Jacques Mercier, David Porcelijn, David Stock, Mark Summerbell, Lucas Vis, and Hans Vonk.

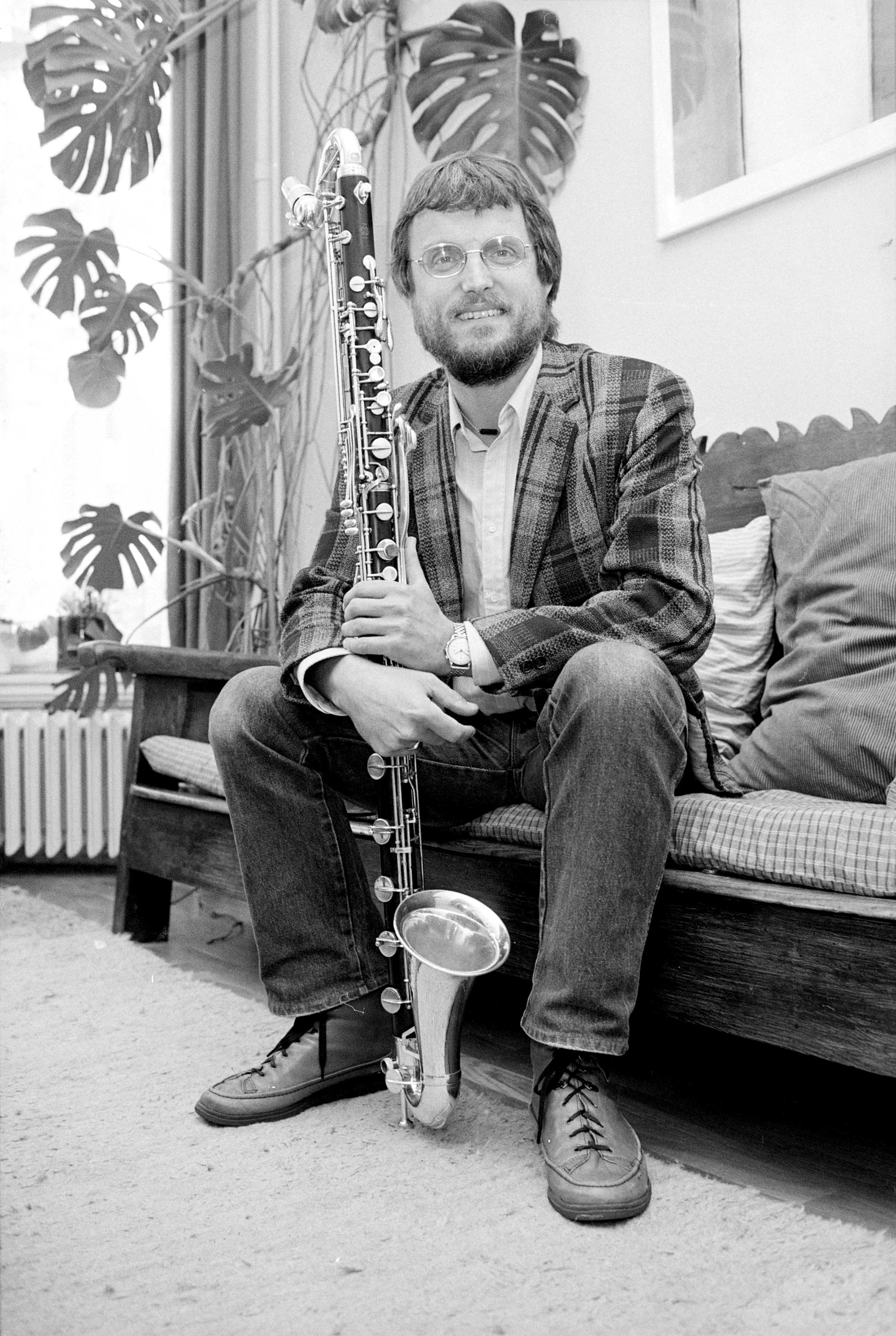
Sparnaay in May 1986

He gave concerts and made radio recordings throughout Asia, Europe, North America, Oceania, and South America, performing works written for and dedicated to him. More than 650 pieces have been written for him by composers such as Jorge Antunes, Claudio Ambrosini, Luciano Berio, Gerard Brophy, Philip Czaplowski, Paul-Heinz Dittrich, Franco Donatoni, Morton Feldman, Brian Ferneyhough, Mary Finsterer, Andrew Ford, Jonathan Harvey, Maki Ishii, Sukhi Kang, Tristan Keuris, Mark Kopytman, Helmut Lachenmann, Ton de Leeuw, Theo Loevendie, Roderik de Man, Takayuki Rai, Michael Smetanin, Gérard Grisey, Maurice Weddington, Iannis Xenakis, Isang Yun and many others.

He gave the world premiere of In Freundschaft (bass clarinet version) and Solo (bass-and contrabass clarinet version–adaptation by Barry Anderson) by Karlheinz Stockhausen and was one of the soloists in Die Verwandlung by Paul-Heinz Dittrich and in the operas Naima by Theo Loevendie, Prometeo by Luigi Nono, and A King, Riding by Klaas de Vries. During the 1999 Holland festival he was one of the instrumental soloists in Kopernikus by Claude Vivier.

His composition Bouwstenen (Building Blocks) for bass clarinet and multiple tape-delay system was chosen for the ISCM World Music Days in Denmark.

Harry Sparnaay was musician-in-residence and gave masterclasses at several universities all over the world and was professor of bass clarinet and contemporary music at the Conservatory of Amsterdam for 35 years, where his unique bass clarinet program attracted students from all over the world, many of them prize winners of major competitions.

Sparnaay founded the duo Fusion Moderne with pianist Polo de Haas, and also the Bass Clarinet Collective (9 bass clarinets, including 3 contrabass clarinets).

Together with flautist Harrie Starreveld and pianist René Eckhardt he formed Het Trio in 1984. Over 180 pieces have been written for this group. With Annelie de Man (Harpsichord) he founded the Duo Double_Action performing new compositions written for them for bass clarinet and harpsichord by composers such as Joe Cutler, Roderik de Man, Victor Varela, David Vayo, and Raymond Deane. With his wife Silvia Castillo (organ) he formed the Duo LEVENT and together they performed in Europe, Canada, Mexico, Australia and the United States, playing several new pieces for organ and bass clarinet, especially written for them by composers such as Dai Fujikura, Matthias Kadar, Roderik de Man, Toek Numan, Ignacio Baca Lobera, and Lucien Goethals.

He played as soloist, with the trio, or in other combinations on more than 60 CDs and his CD with HET TRIO of music by Ton de Leeuw received an EDISON award.

In Barcelona he formed the Trio PHONOS with Jean-Pierre Dupuy piano and Peter Bacchus flute and with pianist Jean-Pierre Dupuy the Duo Sparnaay/Dupuy.

His television productions have been broadcast in the Netherlands, Belgium, Poland, and Yugoslavia. He has been a jury member at the International Gaudeamus Contest several times and has also been a member of the Dutch Section of the ISCM. As the conductor of the ensemble for New Music he conducted compositions by Arnold Schoenberg (Pierrot Lunaire and Serenade), Pierre Boulez, Elliott Carter, Olivier Messiaen, Theo Loevendie, Franco Donatoni, Ross Harris, Joe Cutler, Toshio Hosokawa, Mary Finsterer, and Iannis Xenakis, and during the International Gaudeamus Music Week he conducted the ensemble in pieces by the youngest generation.

From September 2005 until September 2010 he was Professor for bass clarinet at the ESMUC in Barcelona.

== Awards ==
- First Prize Gaudeamus Contest (1972)
- Swedish Record Prize (1985)
- Bulgarian Composers Union Award (1987)
- Inaugural Sounds Australian Award (1988)
- Edison Award (1995)
- Jan van Gilse Prize (1996)

In April 2004, he was honoured by the Queen, decorated by the Mayor of Amsterdam, and became a Knight of the Order of the Netherlands Lion.

== Teaching ==
In his 30 years of teaching, Sparnaay was professor of musicians who came from all over the world, a selection per country of origin:

- Austria: Petra Stump-Linshalm
- Germany: Tobias Klein, Lothar Ohlmeier
- Mexico: Fernando Dominguez
- Netherlands: Jelte Althuis, Henri Bok, Jacques Dubois, Fie Schouten
- Switzerland: Ernesto Molinari
- Turkey: Oguz Büyükberber
- UK: Sarah Watts
- US: Laura Carmichael, Lori Freedman, Michael Lowenstern

== Sources ==
- Diederichs-Lafite, Marion. 1976. Wittener Tage für neue Kammermusik. Österreichische Musikzeitschrift 31 (July–August): 382–84.
- Heim, Norman. 1979. "Music for the Bass Clarinet". The Clarinet 6, no. 3 (Spring): 18–21.
- Heim, Norman. 1979. "Music for the Bass Clarinet Part II". The Clarinet 7, no. 1 (Fall): 22–23, 26.
- Heim, Norman. 1980. "Music for the Bass Clarinet Part III: A Sparnaay Collage". The Clarinet 7, no. 3 (Spring): 22–24.
- Heim, Norman. 1980. "Music for the Bass Clarinet Part IV: An Interview with Harry Sparnaay". The Clarinet 7, no. 4 (Summer): 14–18.
- Schwartz, Elliott. 1972. "Current Chronicle: The Netherlands". The Musical Quarterly 58, no. 4 (October): 653–58.
- Slonimsky, Nicolas, Laura Kuhn, and Dennis McIntire. 2001. "Sparnaay, Harry". Baker’s Biographical Dictionary of Musicians, centennial edition, 6 vols., Nicolas Slonimsky, editor emeritus; Laura Kuhn, Baker's series advisory editor, 5:3416. New York: Schirmer Books. ISBN 0-02-865525-7. [In the online edition as "Spamaay, Hany", New York: Schirmer Reference, 2001. Gale Virtual Reference Library. (Subscription access)]
- Sparnaay, Harry. 2011. "The Bass Clarinet: A Personal History", translated by A. de Man and P. Roe. Barcelona: Periferia Sheet Music. Accompanied by a CD with over 100 audio examples.
- Tra, Gijs. 1978. "Bass Clarinet Identity (Interview with H. Sparnaay)". Key Notes 7, no. 1:36–37.
- Werker, Gerard. 1972. "Vrijpostig musiceren: het Gaudeamus-Concours 1972". Mens en Melodie, Tijdschrift voor muziek 27 (June): 171–74.
- Werker, Gerard. 1974. "Harry Sparnaay, basklarinettist—de emancipatie van de basklarinet". Mens en Melodie, Tijdschrift voor muziek 29 (December): 370–73.
- Remembering Harry Sparnaay
