= Tara Bouman =

Dutch clarinettist

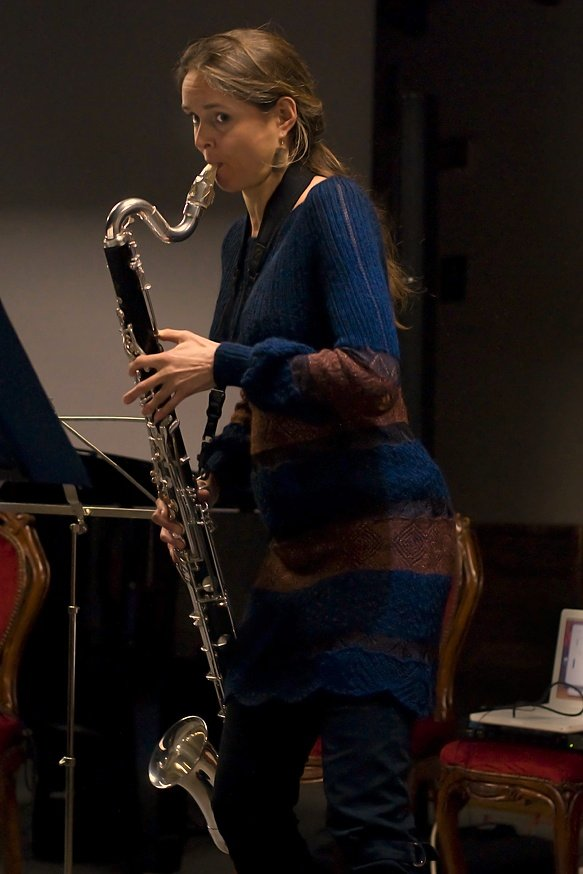
Bouman playing the bass clarinet.

Tara Bouman (born 1970 in Leiden) is a Dutch clarinetist.

Bouman studied the clarinet at the conservatories of Amsterdam and Rotterdam with Walter Boeijkens and Piet Honingh. She plays the clarinet, bass clarinet, and basset horn.

Musicians and conductors she has worked with include Suzanne Stephens, Reinbert de Leeuw, Stephan Asbury, Jonathan Nott, Riccardo Chailly, Roscoe Mitchell, Michael Riessler, Cuarteto de Cuerdas "José White", Simon Stockhausen and Alain Damiens. Her current musical partners include trumpeter Markus Stockhausen, accordionist Edwin Buchholz, percussionist Tatiana Koleva and flutist Helen Bledsoe. With Bledsoe and Koleva she forms the ensemble TEYAS.

Bouman has worked together with a number of composers whose repertoire she has played. Among these are Karlheinz Stockhausen, Georges Aperghis, György Kurtág, György Ligeti, Oliver Knussen, George Benjamin, Roderik de Man, Magnus Lindberg, Earl Brown and Isabel Mundry, as well as composers of her own generation such as Juan Felipe Waller, Vykintas Biliauskas, Robin de Raaff, Sinta Wullur, Hans Koolmees and Symon Clarke. She plays regularly in contemporary ensembles in the Netherlands and Germany (a.o. ASKO Ensemble, Schönberg Ensemble, Ensemble Musikfabrik NRW, Ensemble Köln).

As a soloist and chamber musician Tara Bouman has played concerts all over Europe, Mexico and the United States. She recorded her first CD with solos and duos by Markus Stockhausen, Karlheinz Stockhausen, Isabel Mundry and Pierre Boulez.

The composer Ana Lara dedicated her work Concierto para corno di basseto to Bouman, who performed the première with the Orquesta Filarmónica de la UNAM (OFUNAM) on 10 February 2007.
