= Luís Afonso =

- Also known as: Montanha
- Origin: Brazil
- Occupations: Clarinetist and Professor
- Instrument: Clarinet

Luís Afonso (also known as Montanha) is a Brazilian clarinetist and bass clarinetist.

Afonso studied clarinet and bass clarinet at the Rotterdam Conservatoire under Walter Boeykens and Henri Bok. He has taught at the University of São Paulo since 1992. He plays clarinet in the Orquestra Sinfônica Municipal and Orquestra Jazz Sinfônica do Estado de São Paulo. He also plays in a bass clarinet duo called Clarones with the Dutch Henri Bok, as well as in the acclaimed clarinet quintet Sujeito a Guincho.

== Discography ==
- with Sujeito a Guincho, Sujeito a Guincho. 1997 - Gravadora Eldorado
- with Sujeito a Guincho, Die Klarinetmaschine. 1999 - YB Music
- with Duo Clarones, Duo Clarones, 2003 - YB Music
