= Bass clarinet =

Member of the clarinet family

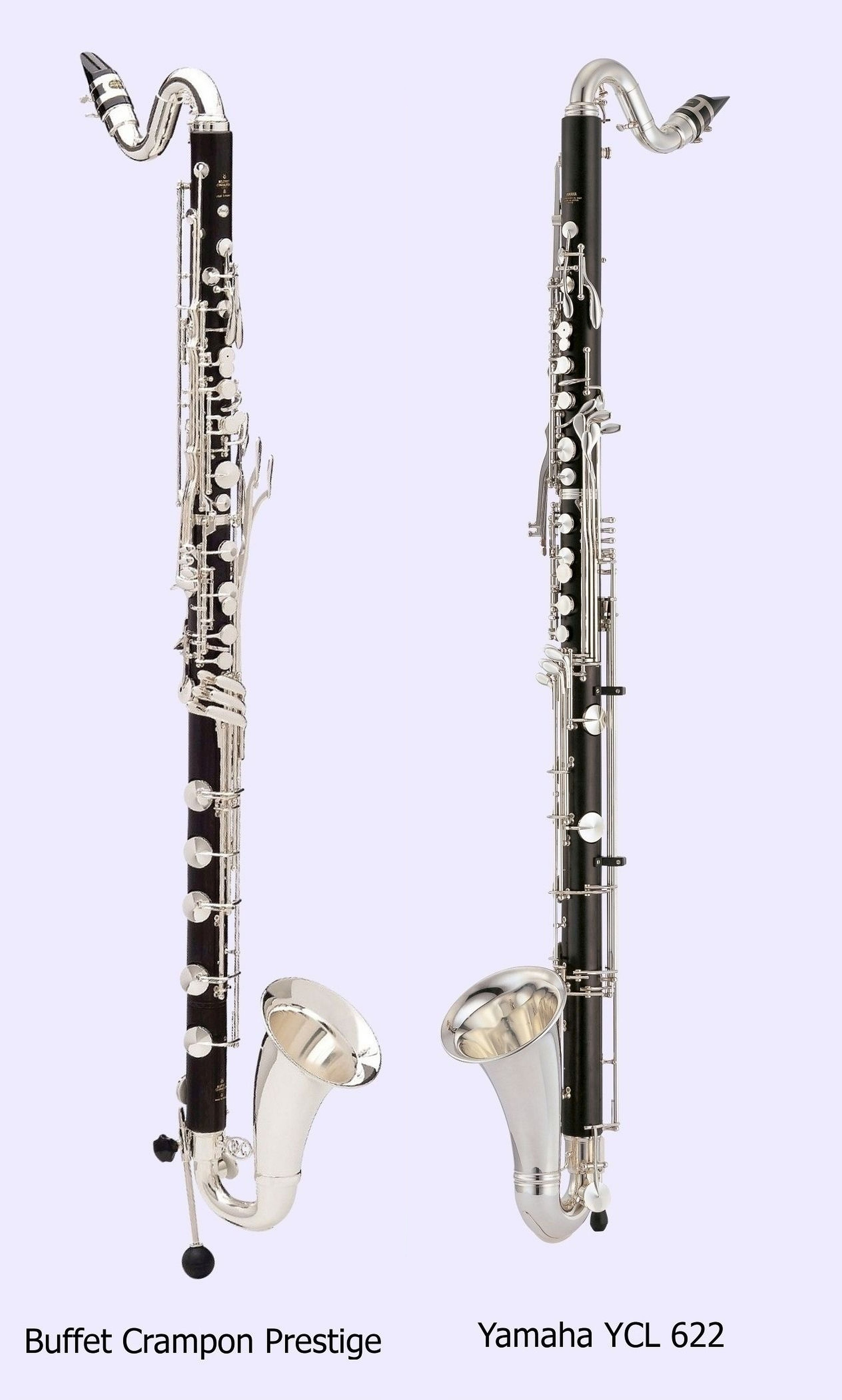
- 2 low C B♭ bass clarinets: Buffet Crampon Prestige 1193 + Yamaha YCL 622 II

Woodwind instrument
- Classification: woodwind instrument: Wind; Woodwind; Single-reed
- Hornbostel–Sachs classification: 422.211.2–71 (Single-reeded aerophone with keys)

Playing range
- low C / low E♭ written: C3 / E♭3 – E7, sounding: B♭1 / D♭2 – D6

Related instruments
- Clarinet family: Basset clarinet; Clarinet d'amore; Basset horn; Alto clarinet; Contra-alto/contrabass clarinet; Clarinet

More articles or information
- Category:Clarinetists

A short sample of the sound of the bass clarinet

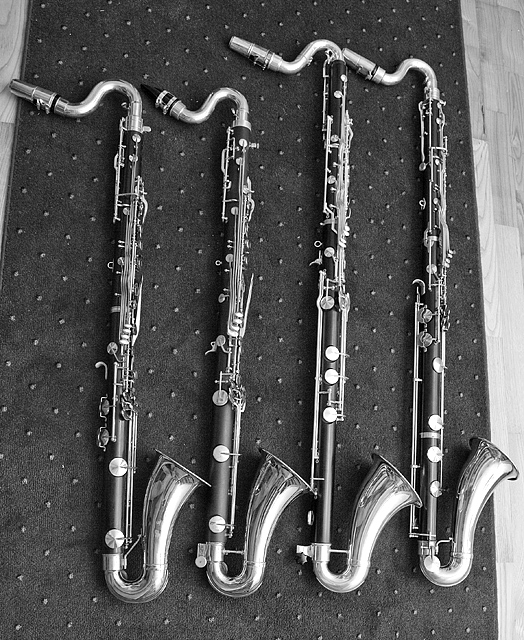
Four modern short bass clarinets, from left to right Leblanc L400, Signet Selmer 1430P, E. M. Winston, Leblanc 330S

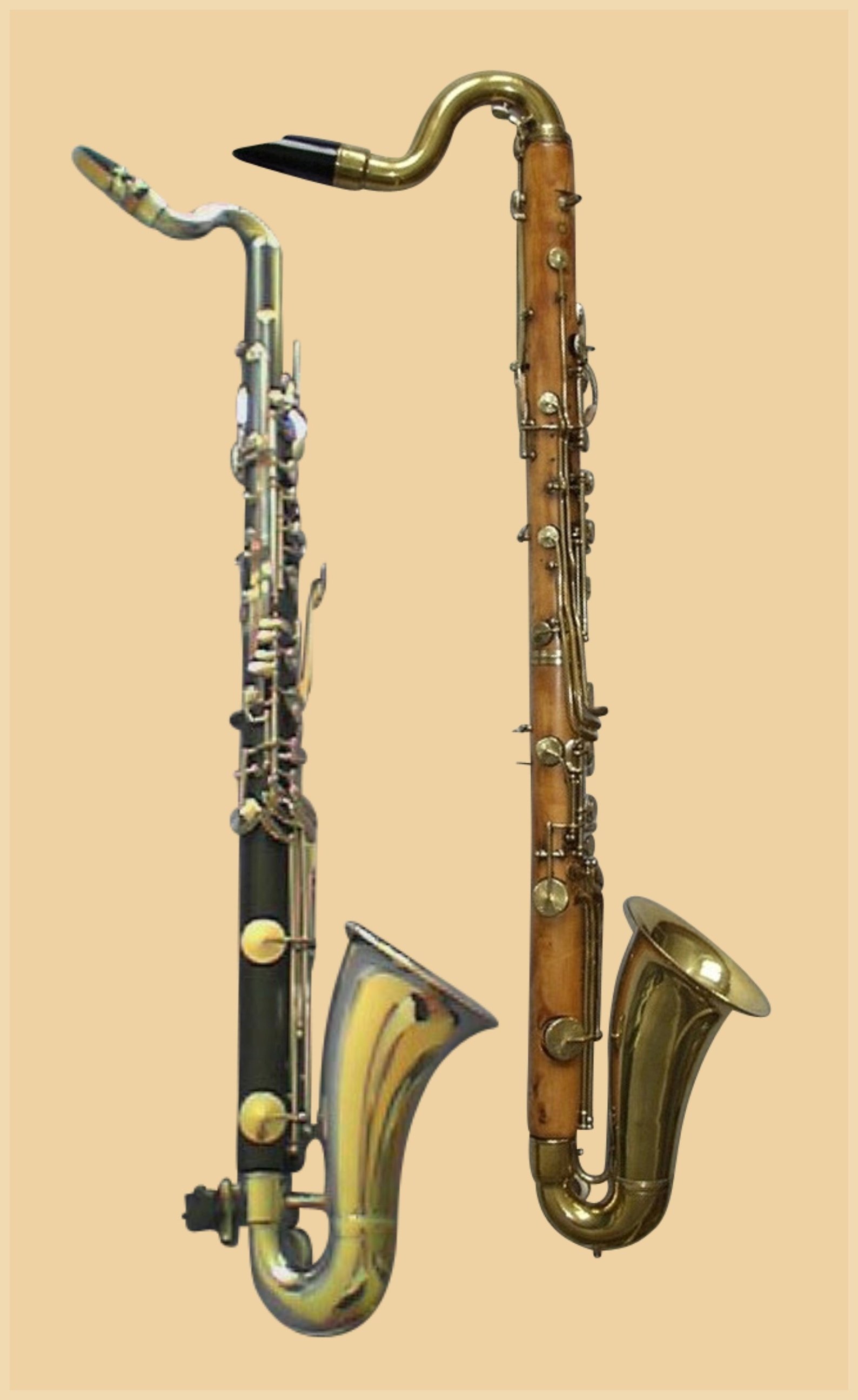
Two short bass clarinets, on the right side made from boxwood

The bass clarinet is a musical instrument of the clarinet family. Like the more common soprano B♭ clarinet, it is usually pitched in B♭ (meaning it is a transposing instrument on which a written C sounds as B♭), but it plays notes an octave below the soprano B♭ clarinet. Bass clarinets in other keys, notably C and A, also exist, but are very rare (in contrast to the regular A clarinet, which is quite common in classical music). Bass clarinets regularly perform in orchestras, wind ensembles and concert bands, and occasionally in marching bands and jazz bands. They also play an occasional solo role in contemporary music and jazz in particular.

Someone who plays a bass clarinet is called a bass clarinettist or a bass clarinetist.

== Description ==
Most modern bass clarinets are straight-bodied, with a small upturned silver-colored metal bell and a curved metal neck. Early examples varied in shape, some having a doubled body, making them look similar to bassoons. The bass clarinet is fairly heavy and is supported either with a neck strap or an adjustable peg attached to its body. While Adolphe Sax imitated its upturned metal bell in his design of the larger saxophones, the two instruments are fundamentally different. Bass clarinet bodies are most often made of grenadilla (African Blackwood) or (more commonly for student-instruments) plastic resin, while saxophones are typically made of metal. (Metal bass clarinets exist, but are rare.) More significantly, all clarinets have a bore that is basically the same diameter along the body. This cylindrical bore differs from the saxophone's conical one and gives the clarinet its characteristic tone, causing it to overblow at the twelfth (octave + fifth) compared with the saxophone's octave.

A majority of modern bass clarinets, like other clarinets in the family, have the Boehm system of keys and fingering. However, bass clarinets are also manufactured in Germany with the Oehler system of keywork, which is most often known as the 'German" system in the US, because it is commonly used in Germany and Austria, as well as Eastern Europe and Turkey; bass clarinets produced with the Oehler system's predecessor, the Albert system, are still in use, particularly in these areas. German system bass clarinets frequently have a bore that is significantly narrower than most Boehm system instruments, resulting in a somewhat different sound and set of playing characteristics. Some modern clarinet makers have successfully produced Boehm system bass clarinets with a German bore, but these are not in widespread use.

Most modern Boehm system bass clarinets have an "extension" key allowing them to play to the (written) E♭. This key was originally added to allow easy transposition of parts for the relatively rare bass clarinet pitched in A, but it now finds significant use in concert band and other literature. A significant difference between soprano and bass clarinet key work is a key pad played by the left-hand index finger with a vent that may be uncovered for certain high notes. This allows a form of "half-hole" fingering that allows notes in higher registers to be played on the instrument. In addition, older bass clarinets have two register keys, one for middle D♯ and below, the other for middle E and higher. Newer models typically have an automatic register key mechanism, where a single left thumb key commands the two vent holes. Depending on whether the right hand ring finger (used in fingerings for middle D♯ and below) is down or up, the lower or upper vent hole will open.

Modern professional and advanced bass clarinet models extend down to a low C, two octaves below written middle C. At concert pitch this note is the B♭ below the second ledger line below the bass staff or B♭_{1} in scientific pitch notation (identical to the bassoon's lowest B♭). These three lowermost half-steps are played via additional keys operated by the right thumb, some of them often duplicated in the left- or right-hand little-finger key clusters. Overall, the instrument sounds an octave lower than the B♭ soprano clarinet.

As with all wind instruments, the upper limit of the range depends on the quality of the instrument and skill of the clarinetist. According to Aber and Lerstad, who give fingerings up to written C_{8} (sounding B♭_{6}), the highest note commonly encountered in modern solo literature is written E_{6}, an octave and sixth below that (sounding D_{5}, the D above treble C). This gives the bass clarinet a common range of up to four octaves, quite close to the range of the bassoon; indeed, many bass clarinetists perform works originally intended for bassoon or cello because of the plethora of literature for those two instruments and the relative scarcity of solo works for the bass clarinet.

== Uses ==
The bass clarinet has been regularly used in scoring for orchestra and concert band since the mid-19th century, becoming more common during the middle and latter part of the 20th century. A bass clarinet is not always called for in orchestra music, but is almost always called for in concert band music. In recent years, the bass clarinet has also seen a growing repertoire of solo literature including compositions for the instrument alone, or accompanied by piano, orchestra, or other ensemble. It is also used in clarinet choirs, marching bands, and in film scoring, and has played a persistent role in jazz.

The bass clarinet has a rich and deep tone, distinct from other instruments in its range.

=== Musical compositions ===
Perhaps the earliest solo passages for bass clarinet—indeed, among the earliest parts for the instrument—occur in Mercadante's 1834 opera Emma d'Antiochia, in which a lengthy solo introduces Emma's scene in Act 2. (Mercadante actually specified a glicibarifono for this part.) Two years later, Giacomo Meyerbeer wrote an important solo for bass clarinet in Act 4 of his opera Les Huguenots.

French composer Hector Berlioz was one of the first of the Romantics to use the bass clarinet in his large-scale works such as the Grande symphonie funèbre et triomphale, Op. 15 (1840), the Te Deum, Op. 22 (1849), and the opera Les Troyens, Op. 29 (1863). Later French composers to use the instrument included Maurice Ravel, who wrote virtuosic parts for the bass clarinet in his ballet Daphnis et Chloé (1912), La valse (1920), and his orchestration of Modest Mussorgsky's Pictures at an Exhibition (1924).

The operas of Richard Wagner also make extensive use of the bass clarinet, beginning with Tannhäuser (1845). He incorporated the instrument fully into the wind section as both a solo and supporting instrument. Wagner pioneered in exploiting the instrument's dark, somber tone to represent sadness and melancholy. Wagner was almost completely responsible for making the instrument a permanent member of the opera orchestra. The instrument plays an extensive role in Tristan und Isolde (1859), the operas of Der Ring des Nibelungen (1876), and Parsifal (1882).

Also around this time, Hungarian pianist and composer Franz Liszt wrote important parts for the instrument in his symphonic poems Ce qu'on entend sur la montagne (What One Hears on the Mountain), Tasso, and his Dante Symphony. Giuseppe Verdi followed suit, using it in Ernani, Aida (1870), La forza del destino, Simon Boccanegra, Don Carlo and Falstaff. Following in Verdi's footsteps, Giacomo Puccini, composer of La Bohème, Tosca and Madame Butterfly, used the bass clarinet in all of his operas, beginning with Edgar in 1889. The Russian composer Pyotr Ilyich Tchaikovsky wrote some prominent solos for the instrument in his last ballet, The Nutcracker.

The later Romantics used the bass clarinet frequently in their works. All of Gustav Mahler's symphonies include the instrument prominently, and often contain lengthy solos for the instrument, especially in his Symphony No. 6 in A minor. Richard Strauss wrote for the instrument in all of his symphonic poems except for Don Juan, and the instrument shared the spotlight with the tenor tuba in his 1898 tone poem, Don Quixote, Op. 35. Strauss wrote for the instrument as he did for the smaller clarinets, and the parts often include playing in very high registers, such as in Also Sprach Zarathustra, Op. 30.

Composers of the Second Viennese School, Arnold Schoenberg, Anton Webern and Alban Berg, often favored the instrument over the bassoon, the instrument's closest relative in terms of range. Russian composers Dmitri Shostakovich and Sergei Prokofiev used the low concert C and B♭ (equivalent to the bassoon's lowest two notes) in many of their compositions and an instrument with the extended range is necessary for works such as Shostakovich's Symphonies Nos. 4, 6, 7, 8, and 11, and Leoš Janáček's Sinfonietta. All of these works exploit the instrument's dark, powerful lower range.

Prokofiev wrote parts for the instrument in his Symphonies Nos. 2–7 and in his ballet Romeo and Juliet. Sergei Rachmaninoff used the instrument to great effect in his Symphonies Nos. 2 and 3 and in his symphonic poem, Isle of The Dead. Igor Stravinsky also wrote complex parts for the instrument throughout his career, most prominently in his ballets The Firebird (1910), Petrushka (1911) and The Rite of Spring (1913).

The bass clarinet has a solo at the opening of the third movement of Ferde Grofé's Grand Canyon Suite.

In the duet "A Boy Like That" from West Side Story (1957), Leonard Bernstein scored for "the inky sounds of three bass clarinets".

Early minimalist Steve Reich's Music for 18 Musicians (1976) calls for two bass clarinets, featured prominently in the lower register. Used almost percussively, the effect of deep, staccato repetitions, played beneath a static rhythmic drone, is to create a feeling of slowly fluctuating cycles.

One of the most performed works for Bass Clarinet is Marc Mellits's Black, with over 3,000 performances as of 2024.

Many modern composers employ the bass along with the contra-alto and contrabass clarinets, such as Esa-Pekka Salonen in his Piano Concerto. A great amount of literature can be found in the wind ensemble, in which there is always a part for the instrument.

There are many important solo pieces, duos, sonatas and concertos for bass clarinet, including:

- Kalevi Aho Concerto for Bass Clarinet and Orchestra (2018)
- Georges Aperghis – Façade-Trio (2 x bass clarinet, percussion)
- Howard J. Buss "Lunar Vistas" for solo bass clarinet, "Three Euphonics for Solo Bass Clarinet," "Color'tudes" for bass clarinet and piano (2021)
- Ann Callaway Concerto for Bass Clarinet and Chamber Orchestra (1985–1987)
- Unsuk Chin: Advice from a Caterpillar (2007)
- Peter Maxwell Davies: The Seas of Kirk Swarf for bass clarinet and strings (2007).
- Daniel Dorff: Flowers of St. Francis five scenes for bass clarinet, In A Deep Funk dance set for bass clarinet (or contrabass or contralto)
- Anders Eliasson Concerto for Bass Clarinet and Orchestra (1996)
- Michael Finnissy – Tussen Rede en Gevoel (2018) 2 x bass clarinet, cello, double bass
- James Gardner: Rendering for solo bass clarinet
- Osvaldo Golijov: Dreams and Prayers of Isaac the Blind for Klezmer clarinetist (soprano clarinets, bass clarinet and/or basset horn) and string quartet, later arranged for solo clarinetist and string orchestra.
- Ig Henneman – Featherlight monkeys (2016) 3 x bass clarinet
- Rozalie Hirs: Article 7 (2012) bass clarinet & electronics
- Guus Janssen: Met spoed (Urgent) for bass clarinet and piano
- Rafael Leonardo Junchaya: Concerto Silvestre for bass clarinet and orchestra Op.14a. Premiered by Marco Antonio Mazzini and the GUSO Orchestra conducted by Steven Decraene in May 2009. First version for bass clarinet and string orchestra (Concertino Silvestre Op.14) premiered in Guatemala in July 2009.
- Tobias Klein: Leichte Überlappungen (2018) 2 x bass clarinet
- Jos Kunst (composer): Solo identity I (1972)
- David Lang: Press Release for solo bass clarinet (1991) (For Evan Ziporyn)
- Ivana Loudova: Aulos for solo bass clarinet (can also be played as a duo with Claude Debussy's Syrinx for flute
- Donald Martino: Triple Concerto for clarinet, bass clarinet, and contrabass clarinet.
- Marc Mellits: Black, for two Bass Clarinets
- Thea Musgrave: Concerto for bass clarinet and orchestra.
- Jonathan Russell:
  - Bass clarinet concerto (2014)
  - Double bass-clarinet concerto.
- Osmo Tapio Räihälä: Claroscuro for solo bass clarinet, strings and percussion (2019)
- Rebecca Saunders: Aether (2014–2016) 2 bass clarinets
- Jeroen Speak: Epiesodos in a version for solo bass clarinet
- Benjamin Staern: Worried Souls: concerto for clarinet/bass clarinet and symphony orchestra (2012).
- Johannes Maria Staud: Black Moon for solo bass clarinet
- Karlheinz Stockhausen:
  - In Freundschaft for unaccompanied bass clarinet,
  - Libra for bass clarinet and electronic music (a separable component of Sirius)
  - Harmonien for unaccompanied bass clarinet.
- Jörg Widmann: Friedenskantate, bass clarinet solo in Praeludium
- Nigel Westlake: Invocations for bass clarinet and chamber orchestra

There is a rich and diverse chamber repertoire for bass clarinet and other instruments, including Leoš Janáček's suite Mládí (Youth), Karlheinz Stockhausen's Kontra-Punkte, Theo Loevendie's Plus One for flute, bass clarinet & piano and Beat Furrer's Gaspra for ensemble incl. bass clarinet.

=== Soloists and ensembles ===
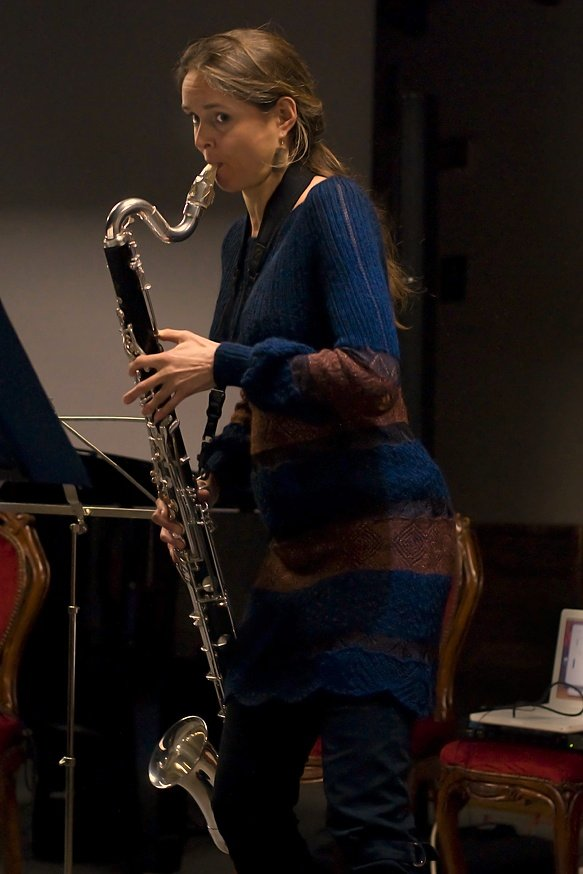
Tara Bouman playing bass clarinet

It was not until the 1950s that classical performers began to adopt the bass clarinet as their primary instrument. The pioneer was the Czech performer Josef Horák (1931–2005), who is credited as having performed the first ever solo bass clarinet recital on March 23, 1955. This marked a turning point when the instrument first became thought of as a soloist's instrument.

Because the repertoire of solo music for the bass clarinet was quite small, most bass clarinet soloists specialize in new music, while also arranging works composed for other instruments from earlier eras (such as the Bach Cello Suites). Beginning with Horák, many players have commissioned works for the instrument, and consequently there now exists a repertoire of hundreds of solo works, many by prominent international composers such as Brian Ferneyhough and David Lang. In addition to Horák, other specialist performers include Henri Bok (Netherlands), his student Luís Afonso (Brazil), Dennis Smylie (United States), Tommie Lundberg (Sweden), Harry Sparnaay (Netherlands, who has worked with important composers such as Luciano Berio, Iannis Xenakis, and Morton Feldman), Fie Schouten (artistic director Basklarinet Festijn; worked with o.a. Georges Aperghis, Michael Finnissy, Theo Loevendie, Louis Sclavis, Rozalie Hirs) Jason Alder, Evan Ziporyn (United States), and Michael Lowenstern (United States); the latter two are also composers.

In October 2005, the First World Bass Clarinet Convention was held in Rotterdam, Netherlands, at which Horák was the guest of honor and played in one of the many concerts given by the leading bass clarinetists from around the world (including all the aforementioned performers, as well as many others).

In April 2014, 70th birthday of Harry Sparnaay, the first Basklarinet Festijn was held in the Netherlands. Initiators and artistic leaders are former students of Sparnaay and active in contemporary composed and improvised music: Fie Schouten and Tobias Klein.

At least two professional bass-clarinet quartets exist. Rocco Parisi's Bass Clarinet Quartet is an Italian group whose repertoire includes transcriptions of music by Gioacchino Rossini, Niccolò Paganini, and Ástor Piazzolla. Edmund Welles is the name of a bass clarinet quartet based in San Francisco. Their repertoire includes original "heavy chamber music" and transcriptions of madrigals, boogie-woogie tunes, and heavy metal songs. Two of the members of Edmund Welles also perform as a bass clarinet duo, Sqwonk.

=== In jazz ===
While the bass clarinet was seldom heard in early jazz compositions, a bass clarinet solo by Wilbur Sweatman can be heard on his 1924 recording "Battleship Kate" and a bass clarinet solo by Omer Simeon can be heard in the 1926 recording "Someday Sweetheart" by Jelly Roll Morton and His Red Hot Peppers. Additionally, Benny Goodman recorded with the instrument a few times early in his career.

Harry Carney, Duke Ellington's baritone saxophonist for 47 years, played bass clarinet in some of Ellington's arrangements, first recording with it on the song, "Saddest Tale" in 1934. He was featured soloist on many Ellington recordings, including 27 titles on bass clarinet.

The first jazz album on which the leader solely played bass clarinet was Great Ideas of Western Mann (1957) by Herbie Mann, better known as a flautist. However, avant-garde musician Eric Dolphy (1928–1964) was the first major jazz soloist on the instrument, and established much of the vocabulary and technique used by later performers. He used the entire range of the instrument in his solos. Bennie Maupin emerged in the late 1960s as a primary player of the instrument, playing on Miles Davis's seminal record Bitches Brew as well as several records with Herbie Hancock's Mwandishi group. His style resembles Dolphy's in its use of advanced harmonies.

While the bass clarinet has been used often since Dolphy, it is typically used by a saxophonist or clarinetist as a second or third instrument; such musicians include David Murray, Marcus Miller, John Surman, John Gilmore, Bob Mintzer, John Coltrane (to whom Dolphy's mother left some of Dolphy's instruments including his bass clarinet.), Brian Landrus, James Carter, Steve Buckley, Andy Biskin, Don Byron, Julian Siegel, Gunter Hampel, Michel Portal, Myron Walden, Yusef Lateef, Paul McCandless, Gianluigi Trovesi, Kaoru Abe and Chris Potter. Very few performers have used the instrument exclusively, but such performers include American Michael Pinz, Berlin-based bass clarinetist Rudi Mahall, and French bass clarinetists Louis Sclavis and Denis Colin. Klezmer clarinetist Giora Feidman is known for idiosyncratic use of the bass clarinet on some klezmer and jazz tunes.

=== In rock ===
On The Beatles 1967 recording of George Harrison's "It's All Too Much", a prominent bass clarinet ostinato, scored and conducted by producer George Martin, is played by session musician Paul Harvey.

Victor Hayden, AKA The Mascara Snake, was a member of Captain Beefheart's band in the late 1960s, playing bass clarinet on the 1969 album Trout Mask Replica.

On Steely Dan's 1980 song "Babylon Sisters", bass clarinets are played by George Marge and Walter Kane.

On Flight of the Conchords' 2009 song "Rambling Through the Avenues of Time", the instrument is used as a form of word painting when one is heard after Bret McKenzie sings the line "my heart played a bass clarinet". The part is played by David Ralicke.

On Paramore's 2023 album This Is Why, the song "Figure 8" prominently features a bass clarinet. The part is played by Henry Solomon.

== History ==
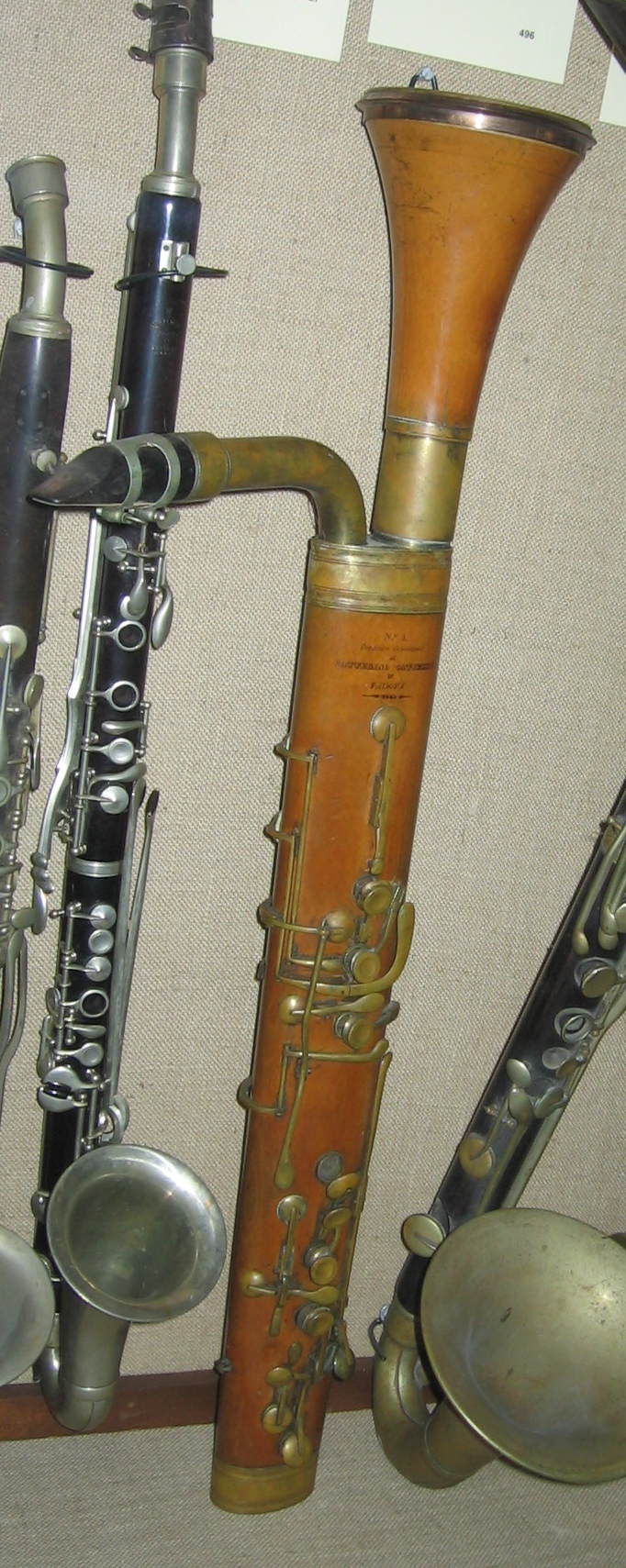
Glicibarifono by Catterini, 1838

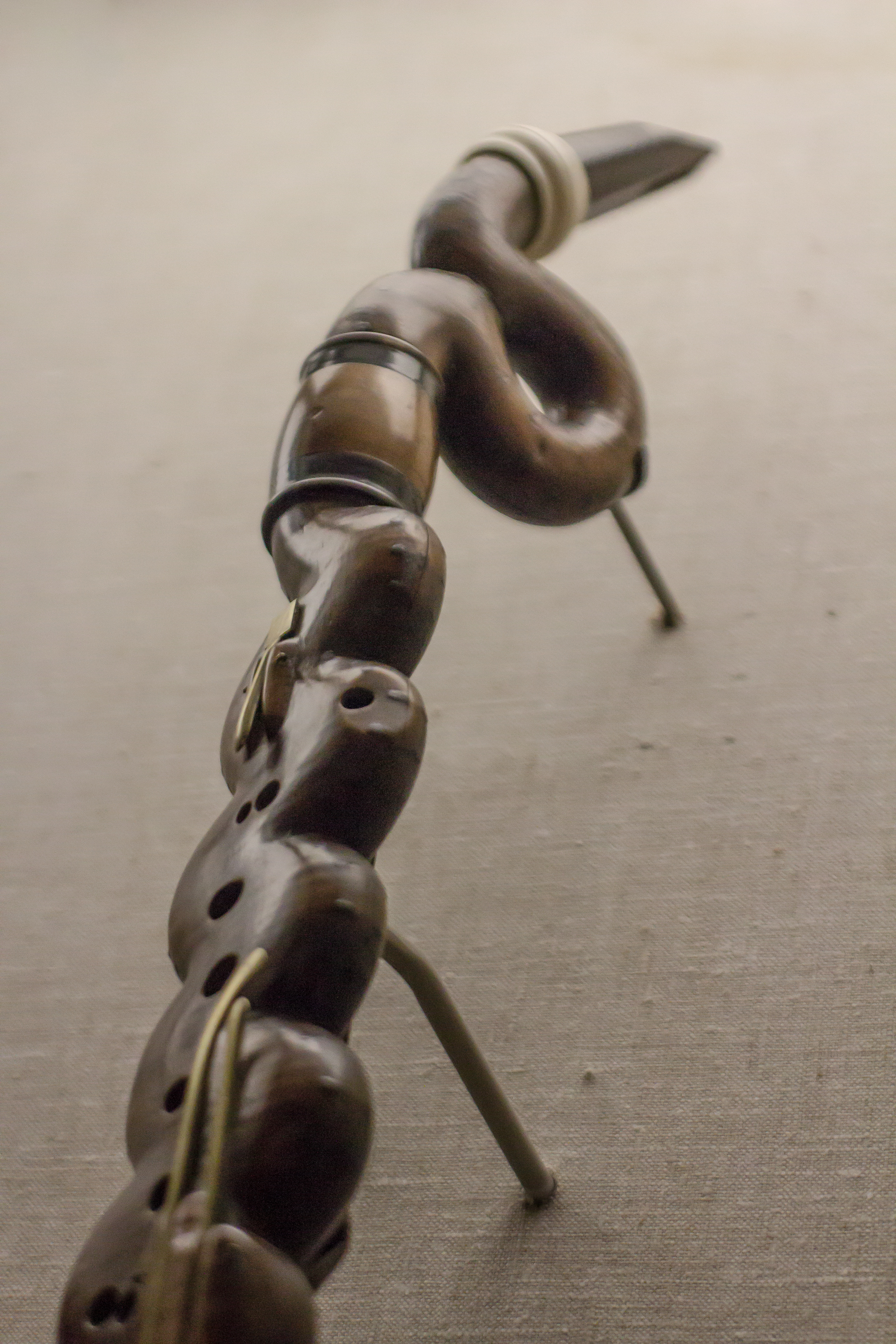
The serpentine bass clarinet by Papalini, 1820

There are several instruments that can arguably be considered the first bass clarinet. Probably the earliest is a dulcian-shaped instrument in the Museum Carolino Augusteum in Salzburg. It is incomplete, lacking a crook or mouthpiece, and appears to date from the first half of the eighteenth century. Its wide cylindrical bore and its fingering suggest it was a chalumeau or clarinet in the bass range. Four anonymous bass chalumeaux or clarinets apparently dating from the eighteenth century and having from one to six keys also appear to be among the earliest examples, and one in particular has been suggested to date from before 1750. However, the authenticity of at least one of these instruments has been questioned.

In the Munich Stadtmuseum there is an instrument made c. 1770 by the Mayrhofers of Passau, who are often credited with the invention of the basset horn. It resembles early sickle-shaped basset horns, but has a larger bore and is longer, playing in low B♭. Whether this should be considered a low basset horn or a bass clarinet is a matter of opinion. In any case, no further work along this line is known to have been done.

A 1772 newspaper article describes an instrument called the "basse-tube", invented by G. Lott in Paris in 1772. This instrument has not survived and very little is known of it. The article has frequently been cited as the earliest record of a bass clarinet, but it has more recently been suggested that the basse-tube was in fact a basset horn.

The Klarinetten-Bass by Heinrich Grenser, c. 1793, had a folded, bassoon-like shape and an extended range, and was presumably intended to serve as a bassoon replacement in military bands. Desfontenelles of Lisieux built a bass clarinet in 1807 whose shape was similar to that of the later saxophone. It had thirteen keys, at a time when most soprano clarinets had fewer.

Additional designs were developed by many other makers, including Dumas of Sommières (who called his instrument a "Basse guerrière") in 1807; Nicola Papalini, c. 1810 (an odd design, in the form of a serpentine series of curves, carved out of wood); George Catlin of Hartford, Connecticut ("clarion") c. 1810; Sautermeister of Lyons ("Basse-orgue") in 1812; Gottlieb Streitwolf in 1828; and Catterino Catterini ("glicibarifono") in the 1830s. These last four, and several others of the same period, had bassoon-like folded shapes, and most had extended ranges. A straight-bodied instrument without extended range was produced in 1832 by Isaac Dacosta and Auguste Buffet.

Adolphe Sax bass clarinet in B♭

Finally, Adolphe Sax, a Belgian manufacturer of musical instruments, designed a straight-bodied form of the bass clarinet in 1838. Sax's expertise in acoustics led him to include such features as accurately-placed, large tone holes and a second register hole. His instrument achieved great success and became the basis for all bass clarinet designs since.

The instrument on which Anton Stadler first played Wolfgang Amadeus Mozart's clarinet concerto was originally called a Bass-Klarinette, but was not a bass clarinet in the modern sense; since the late eighteenth century this instrument has been called a basset clarinet.

== Notation ==
Orchestral music for bass clarinet is written using one of four systems:

1. Conventional treble clef in B♭ (French notation). This sounds an octave and a major second lower than written and therefore uses the same fingerings as the soprano clarinet, and is the most common.
2. Bass clef in B♭ (German notation). This sounds a major second (tone, or whole step) lower than written. (Note: An example of this notation is in Paul Dukas's symphonic poem "The Sorcerer's Apprentice".) For music written in bass clef, higher passages may be written in treble clef to avoid the use of excessive ledger lines, but this should not be confused with system (a), in which notes sound an octave lower than in system (b). It is therefore necessary to play the treble clef one octave higher than it would be played in French notation, so that it continues to sound a major second lower. Unlike music for the bassoon, the tenor clef is not used for higher passages.
3. Bass clef in B♭ (Russian notation). This notation mixes the German and French systems. Music written in bass clef is played a major second lower than written (German), however when written in treble clef, it sounds a major ninth lower, so the player uses the fingerings they normally would when playing soprano clarinet (French). (Note: An example of this notation is in Igor Stravinsky's "The Rite of Spring".)
4. Bass clef in B♭ (Italian notation). This notation is written a major ninth higher than sounding pitch, as the French notation, however also uses bass clef. This means that the bass clef part would be read an octave lower than if reading it in German notation. The treble clef remains the same as French notation. (Note: An example of this notation is in Luigi Nono's "Canti per 13".)

Music is occasionally encountered written for the bass clarinet in A, e.g., in Wagner operas, and Mahler or Rachmaninov symphonies. This music tends to be written in bass clef, although not invariably (e.g. Ravel's La Valse). Probably the first bass clarinet in A was made by Johann Adam Henkel, around 1850, and a number of greater and lesser known makers continued to produce examples over the next 70 years: e.g., Stengel, Moritz, Kruspe, et al. Buffet made some instruments in the 1920s, but the bass in A was never produced in any great numbers, and after the 1920s very few instruments in A were made (although Fritz Wurlitzer experimented with one in the 1940s).

Despite its relative rarity, important works by some prominent composers featured the bass clarinet in A, and in the early 20th century makers began regularly offering B♭ bass clarinets equipped with an E♭ extension key, so that bass parts in A could be transposed onto the B♭ instrument.

In the 1970s there was a mild revival of interest in the instrument, and Selmer of Paris produced a few instruments pitched in A with Boehm system key work and keyed to low E♭ (even though the original parts seldom descend below written low E). However, these instruments were expensive and many players were reluctant to haul around two heavy bass clarinets to rehearsals and performances, so few of the modern bass clarinets in A were sold. Selmer ceased production of the bass clarinet in A in the late 1980s. Today, very few players own a bass clarinet in A and these parts are generally played on the B♭ instrument, transposing them down a semitone.
