= Henri Bok =

Dutch bass clarinetist

Henri Bok (born 9 March 1950, Rotterdam) is a Dutch bass clarinetist known for his unique compositions.

== Career ==
Bok is noted for his new sound combinations leading to unusual instrumental groups: Duo Contemporain (with marimba/vibraphone), Duo Novair (with accordion), Bass Instincts (with bass oboe), Duo Clarones (bass clarinet duo with Luis Afonso 'Montanha'), Duo HeRo (with jazz pianist Rob van Bavel) and Duo Hevans (with Eleri Ann Evans, saxophones).

Bok has also collaborated with fellow musicians Gustavo Beytelmann, José Luis Estellés, Mike Garson, Josef Horák, Bennie Maupin, Justo Sanz, Louis Sclavis, Willem Tanke, Henri Tournier, Dawn Upshaw, Eric Vloeimans, and many others from all styles and genres. These collaborations have resulted in many new pieces dedicated to him.

Bok has been professor of bass clarinet at Codarts/Rotterdam Superior Conservatoire (The Netherlands). He was professor of bass clarinet at Musikene until 2020 (San Sebastian, Spain), as well as guest professor at the Robert Schumann Hochschule für Musik (Düsseldorf, Germany). He has just taken up a new position at the Fontys Hogeschool voor de Kunsten, Tilburg. Since 2000, he has also taught the bass clarinet class during the annual Julian Menéndez clarinet summer course in Ávila (Spain). Bok is also professor of free improvisation and has performed at several improvisation festivals (amongst others in Tallinn, Estonia).

New Techniques for the Bass Clarinet (www.shoepair.com), which Bok wrote in 1989 (revised in 2011), is considered to be the standard work for instrumentalists and composers interested in extended techniques.

In 2005 Bok was the initiator and artistic director of the first World Bass Clarinet Convention, which took place in Rotterdam and was attended by more than five hundred bass clarinetists from all over the world.

Following his first piece Vinho do Porto Brasileiro (1997), Bok has written a large number of solo works and chamber music. His compositions are published by Shoepair Music.

In recognition of his contribution to music, Henri Bok was made a knight in the Order of the Netherlands Lion by King Willem Alexander in April 2014.

In 2018 he received his PhD at Leiden University with a thesis entitled 'The deep-rooted microtonality of the bass clarinet'.

Bok is an endorser for Backun, D'Addario reeds, Pomarico, and Wiseman bells and cases.

== Discography ==
- "Duo Contemporain", with Miquel Bernat. Globe, 1994
- "Duo Novair", with Miny Dekkers. Globe, 1995
- "Tube Makers", with Miquel Bernat. Globe, 1998
- Music for Bass Clarinet and Piano, with Rainer Klaas. Clarinet Classics, 1999.
- Worlds of Bass Clarinet. Globe, 1999.
- "Duo Clarones", with Luis Afonso Montanha. YBMusic, 2001
- Wicked!. Artistic License, 2003
- BASSics, with Rob Broek. Clarinet Classics, 2003.
- HeRo, with Rob van Bavel. Bloomline, 2005.
- Henri Bok plays David Loeb. Vienna Modern Masters, 2005.
- "In a Nutshell". DVD Shoepair Music Prod., 2006
- "HeRo's Own", with Rob van Bavel. Shoepair Music Prod., 2008
- "HeRo's Heroes", with Rob van Bavel. Shoepair Music Prod., 2008
- "HeRo's Classics", with Rob van Bavel. Shoepair Music Prod., 2008
- "Windsongs", with Joaquin Meijide. Vienna Modern Masters, 2009
- "Voices of the Four Seasons", Vienna Modern Masters, 2012
- "Multitasking", Shoepair Music Prod., 2012
