= Chen Yuanlin =

Chinese composer

- 陈远林
- Born: 1957; Guilin
- Education: State University of New York at Stony Brook

Chen Yuanlin (陈远林; born in Guilin, 1957) is a Chinese electronic composer based in the United States. He is a guest lecturer at the Center for Electronic Music of China (CEMC) founded in 1993 by Professor Zhang Xiaofu at the Central Conservatory of Music in Beijing.

== Education ==
Yuanlin Chen received a bachelor's degree from Central Conservatory of Music in Beijing, China, where he continued his studies and received his master's degree as well. Thereafter he went on to receive a Ph.D. in music from the State University of New York at Stony Brook.

== Works ==
Chen's earliest known publication is 'Flying Swan' written in 1992 and featured in the 1999 album eXchange: China. This eXchange project was created to highlight works by immigrants to the U.S. who are lesser known composers. This particular album focused on immigrants from China. This work features, among others, an early recording of Michael Lowenstern on Bb clarinet, with whom Chen attended Stony Brook University. It wasn't until 2003 that he published his first album, Primary Voice, which features 9 songs played with a mix of traditional Chinese and electronic instruments. These exotic nature songs hint of primitive oriental rites and legends. Chen's perhaps most well known works are featured in his album Away From Xuan. This album features three orchestral works featuring a Chinese ensemble and a guitar quartet among a normal set of orchestra instruments. First recorded and performed by the BBC Scottish Symphony it was conducted by the composer Tan Dun. This album was written to combine styles of the U.S. and styles of Chen's Chinese ancestry. Only a few months later he published another album, Seeking Home, in which he cooperated with the artist Keiko.

== Collaborations ==
Throughout his career, Chen Yuanlin has worked with people on both films and live performances.

- Zhang Zhao,
- Li Long, Dutch
- Lu Little Long, Guo Baochang like
- Ang Lee's "Crouching Tiger”
- Zhang Yimou's “Hero”
- Feng Xiaogang's "The Banquet”
- Tan Dun, "eternal water”
- the opera, "The Peony Pavilion”
- CD 2000 Today and Bitter Love for programming and performing electronic music
