= Shapla Salique =

British singer-songwriter and harmonium player

Shapla Salique শাপলা সালিক
- Born: Farzana Salique; Tajpur, Osmani Nagar, Sylhet District, Sylhet Division, Bangladesh
- Origin: London, England
- Genres: Jazz; pop; funk; soul
- Occupations: Singer; songwriter; harmonium player
- Instruments: Vocals; harmonium
- Years active: 1985–present
- Labels: Journeys by DJ; MIY Publishing
- Formerly of: Dishari Shilpi Gosthi
- Website: www.shaplasalique.com

Farzana Salique (Bengali: ফরজানা সালিক), better known as Shapla Salique, (Bengali: শাপলা সালিক) is a Bangladeshi-born British singer-songwriter and harmonium player.

== Early life ==
Salique was born in Bangladesh and grew up in Tajpur, Osmani Nagar, Sylhet District, where she would often go to watch her father, uncle and grandparents perform in functions. They were renowned folk singers in the Sylhet region. Her grandfather, Azfar Ali, was immensely into music and passed his interest onto the family. Her brother Uchchall plays the tabla.

In February 1970, Salique's father, Abdus Salique (born 1952), came to the United Kingdom. In 1981, at the age of five, Salique came to the United Kingdom to join her father. She came with her mother, Hasna Salique, and two brothers, Uchchall (born 1973) and Shochall (born 1978). They settled in London's East End, where Salique was bought up. Her father first worked as a waiter, then opened up a tailoring workshop before running a restaurant.

Salique attended Raine's Foundation School and has three A-levels in music, English and arts. She enrolled at the University of Leeds to pursue a degree in music and concentrated on her singing career.

== Career ==
=== Early career ===
Since the age of three, Salique has been singing and performing. In 1985, she became the lead singer of the first British Bangladeshi musical group Dishari Shilpi Gosthi, a group founded by her father in 1979 and was based in Shadwell, London.

The group specialised in Sylheti folk songs and the work of Kazi Nazrul Islam. Salique fronted Dishari on numerous albums and television appearances, as well as performances in the UK and abroad throughout the 1980s and 1990s, including performing in front of royalty at the Royal Albert Hall in aid of Save the Children.

In 1996, Salique's first mainstream Bengali song "Ziola" was released in the UK with the music label Journeys by DJ. "Ziola" was remixed by Judge Jules for his album Dance Wars. It was followed by two solo albums; Siyono na Siyona in 1997, a traditional folk oriented Bengali album, and in 2002, the Hindi pop album Lai Lai, produced and composed by Bappi Lahiri.

Salique has appeared on television programmes including, Eastern Eye, Breaking Through and Flame in My Heart.

=== 2013–present ===
In January 2013, Salique performed at the Hackney Empire. In February 2013, she was interviewed by Jumoke Fashola on BBC London 94.9. In the same month, she performed at London's South Bank and at the Houses of Parliament, organised by Oitij-jo.

Salique is the singer, songwriter and harmonium player for her band, the other members include Alok Verma (tabla and percussion), Dion Palumbo (acoustic guitar), Mak Murtic (saxophone), Suroj Sureshbabu (electric and acoustic guitar), Sam Bailey (double bass), and Jason Alder (saxophone).

In March 2013, Salique performed at the Rich Mix Cultural Foundation in London alongside her band as part of BanglaFest. In June 2013, she performed at Wilton's Music Hall alongside her band In the same month, she performed at TEDx Houses of Parliament. In November 2013, she performed at The British Curry Awards.

Salique has also performed at venues including, Royal Albert Hall, Hammersmith Apollo, Royal Ascot and Barbican Centre. She is also writing and recording for her new album which is due to be released in autumn 2015.

Salique has been influenced by music from both East and West, she incorporates global mainstream music and poetic melodies and stories from her traditional heritage of her Bangladesh. She is known for her unique soulful voice and powerful vocals. Her musical arrangement is a fusion of Bengali folk, combined with jazz, pop, funk and soul.

In April 2016 Salique's third album No Boundaries was released which launched at Wilton's Music Hall, followed by a concert at the Southbank Centre.

== Discography ==
=== Albums ===
Title	Album details	Chart positions	Certifications
Siyono na Siyona	Released: 1997; Label: MIY Publishing; Formats: CD		
Lai Lai	Released: 2002; Label: MIY Publishing; Formats: CD		

== See also ==
- British Bangladeshi
- List of British Bangladeshis
- Music of Bengal
