= Michael Lowenstern =

American musician, composer, and educator (born 1968)

- Born: August 23, 1968 (age 57); Chicago, Illinois, United States
- Occupations: Musician, educator
- Years active: 1994 - present
- Notable work: Spasm, Ten Children, Sway
- Spouse: Katherine Cooke (m. 1997)
- Children: Ariel Lowenstern
- Awards: Fulbright Scholar to The Netherlands, 1989-1990; International Gaudeamus Interpreters Competition, Second Prize, 1991
- Website: www.earspasm.com

Michael Lowenstern (born August 23, 1968) is an American musician, composer, and educator, specializing in the bass clarinet. He is well known for his YouTube channel Earspasm and for his many recordings featuring the bass clarinet as a solo instrument in classical, jazz, and electronica formats.

== Early life ==
Lowenstern was born in Chicago, Illinois, and grew up in the Hyde Park neighborhood on the city's South Side. His father, Edward, was a serial entrepreneur, most well known for his work developing the field of consumer debt consolidation in the late 1950s, and his mother, Lois, a real estate appraiser for ABN Amro Bank. The youngest of four, he has one brother, Ken, and two sisters, Linda and Beth. Attending the University of Chicago Laboratory School beginning in 1973, he started playing the clarinet at age 8. He regularly shares his story of that instrument: "I had an old instrument my mom used in high school, and my sister used in high school, and dammit, I was going to play it, because my parent's weren't about to 'buy me an instrument that I would just quit in a few years.'" He was moved by his band director to bass clarinet after two years "because I was holding the band back and I would do less damage on the bass clarinet."

His first clarinet teacher was John Bruce Yeh of the Chicago Symphony Orchestra, whom his father contacted through a mutual friend, Dale Clevenger, the orchestra's principal French horn player. He spent summers at the National Music Camp (now the Interlochen Arts Camp) in Interlochen, Michigan, graduating in 1985 from the Interlochen Arts Academy. While at Interlochen, Lowenstern studied with Richard MacDowell.

He attended the Eastman School of Music, graduating with a bachelor's degree in music and a performer's certificate in 1989, studying with Charles Neidich, and immediately received a Fulbright grant to move to Amsterdam, Netherlands, to continue his studies with bass clarinetist Harry Sparnaay. His post-graduate studies continued with Charles Neidich at the State University of New York at Stony Brook, where he received his MM and PhD in music and composition. It was at Stony Brook where he became interested in computer music, having been one of the early beta-testers of Cycling '74's Max software. It is also at Stony Brook where he met and began work with his long-time collaborator, violinist Todd Reynolds.

== Performing career ==
In 1994, Lowenstern moved to Brooklyn, New York, and began performing and recording with various ensembles, including Steve Reich and Musicians, saxophonist John Zorn, The Klezmatics, and the Chamber Music Society of Lincoln Center. In 1996, his first album, Spasm, was released by New World Records, which is a collection of contemporary classical bass clarinet compositions. In 2000, Lowenstern joined the New Jersey Symphony Orchestra as bass clarinetist and performed on two Grammy Award–winning albums with the ensemble under Zdeněk Mácal. That same year, his second album, 1985, was released by Capstone Records.

In mid-2005, Lowenstern made a major shift in his career and resigned from all of his regular ensembles, including the Chamber Music Society and the New Jersey Symphony, deciding to focus entirely on his solo compositions and performances. Between 2003 and 2015, he self-released several albums through his imprint, Earspasm Music. During this period, he served on the faculties of New York University, the Juilliard School, and the Manhattan School of Music, teaching bass clarinet in their Contemporary Performance Program.

Lowenstern's YouTube channel was established in early 2006, but early content was removed, and few videos exist prior to 2011. At that time, Lowenstern began making and posting videos on the platform for a student so she could listen to her etudes between lessons. The channel grew consistently over the decade and is now one of the highest-ranked clarinet channels by viewership and subscriptions. A number of his videos have created some controversy in the clarinet world, and he is often the subject of intense debate on the long-established Clarinet Pages of Woodwind.org and Sax on the Web. In an interview from July, 2021, Lowenstern is quoted as saying "I don't take myself, or music, too seriously, and I think that offends some people."

== Advertising career ==
In the late 1990s, Lowenstern began working at large advertising agencies in New York City "as a way to supplement his habit of eating and paying rent." Once retired from orchestra work, he began work full time at the digital agency MRM/McCann. In 2008, he moved to R/GA, founding the Digital Advertising group there. It was at R/GA that Lowenstern won several industry awards, including two Cannes Lions, OneShow pencils for his work on Barack Obama's presidential campaign, and several Webby Awards. In 2017, Lowenstern was hired by Amazon to lead creative strategy and development for their automotive advertising Brand Innovation Lab.

== Personal life ==
Michael is married to clarinetist Katherine Cooke and together they have one daughter, Ariel Lowenstern (born August, 1999).

He is a certified pilot and enjoys flying his small 4-seater 1972 Piper Arrow, which he calls a "Toyota with wings".

== Recordings ==
Year	Title	Ensemble/leader
1985	Quiet City	Eastman Wind Ensemble/Wynton Marsalis
1992	Flying Swan	Chen Yuanlin
1994	The Travels of Babar	Raphael Mostel
1995	Xenakis Ensemble Music I	Ensemble ST-X
1995	Emergency Music	Julie Wolfe/Bang on a Can
1995	Jag	Eliot Sharp/Quintet of the Americas
1996	Spasm	Michael Lowenstern
1996	Rare Events	Dan Weymouth
1996	Works by Princeton Composers	
1996	Xenakis Ensemble Music II	Ensemble ST-X
1996	City Music	Steve Reich Ensemble
1996	Common Sense	Common Sense Ensemble
1997	State of the Union	Eliot Sharp
1997	Eight Lines	Steve Reich Ensemble
1998	The Child God	Bun Ching Lam
1998	Arnold Schoenberg Op. 29	Robert Craft
1999	China Exchange	Chen Yuanlin
1999	The Character of American Sunlight	Jerome Kitzke and The Mad Coyote
1999	Café 1930	Mark Gould
1999	Schoenberg Chamber Symphony	Robert Craft
2000	Concertos I	Sequitur
2000	Where the Wild Things Are	Randy Woolf
2000	Reel Life	Howard Shore
2000	Pines of Rome	New Jersey Symphony Orchestra
2000	1985	Michael Lowenstern
2001	In C	Bang On A Can All-Stars
2001	Spectre's Bride	New Jersey Symphony Orchestra
2001	Restless Spirits	Dora Ohrenstein
2002	Susquehannas	Zeitgeist
2002	When the Smoke Clears	Barbara White
2003	Three Musicians	Robert Morris
2003	Blurred	Billband
2003	Ten Children	Michael Lowenstern
2003	Chimeras	John Zorn
2004	To Have and to Hold	Sequitur
2004	Phases	Steve Reich Ensemble
2004	Heavy Light	Stephen Mackey/Mosaic
2005	Dvorak Requiem	New Jersey Symphony Orchestra
2005	When Crows Gather	Sequitur
2005	Webern 5 Canons on Latin Texts	Robert Craft
2005	Crossing the Boulevard	Scott Johnson
2005	Rituals	John Zorn
2006	Tell the Birts	Eve Beglarian
2006	Ottulpo!	Larry Austin
2006	Fade	Michael Lowenstern
2007	Pit Band	William Bolcom
2007	Schoenberg Pierrot Lunaire	Robert Craft
2007	Sing to the Sun	Alvin Singleton
2007	One Peace	Gregg August
2007	Things You Must Do to Get to Heaven	Virgil Moorefield
2009	In C Remixed	Terry Riley/Bill Ryan
2010	Spin Cycle	Michael Lowenstern
2010	Americans	Scott Johnson
2011	Outerborough	Todd Reynolds
2013	Toward Daybreak	Billband
2014	Sway	Michael Lowenstern
2016	Trending on the Verge of Normalcy	Guy Klucevsek
2019	The Goods	Michael Lowenstern
2019	"Insight" (single)	Michael Lowenstern
2021	Distant Places	Tom Nazziola
2021	Ten Children, Vol 1 & 2	Michael Lowenstern
2021	The Redness of Blood	Jerome Kitzke
2025	Vol 2	Baffle
