= Josef Horák =

Czech bass clarinetist

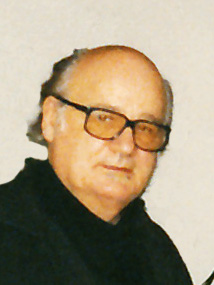
Josef Horák in 1997

Josef Horák (24 March 1931 – 23 November 2005) was a Czech bass clarinetist.

It was not until the 1950s that classical performers began to adopt the bass clarinet as their primary instrument. Horák is credited as having performed the first ever solo bass clarinet recital on 24 March 1955.

In October 2005, the First World Bass Clarinet Convention was held in Rotterdam, Netherlands, at which Horák was the guest of honour. He played his last concert there, together with the pianist Emma Kovárnová (his wife and duo partner for more than 40 years) as "Due Boemi di Praga."
