= Peter Graeme =

English oboist and academic teacher (1921–2012)

- Graeme, c. 1990
- Born: Graeme Peter Crump; 1921
- Died: 1 March 2012 (aged 90–91); Shaftesbury, UK
- Occupation: Classical oboist
- Organizations: Melos Ensemble; Royal Northern College of Music

Graeme Peter Crump (1921 – 1 March 2012), known professionally as Peter Graeme and as "Timmy" Crump to friends and family, was an English oboist and academic teacher. He was best known as the principal oboist of the Melos Ensemble.

== Career ==
Peter Graeme studied the oboe with Léon Goossens. Graeme was the oboist of the Melos Ensemble, founded in 1950, and participated with the group in the premiere of the War Requiem by Benjamin Britten, conducted by the composer at the Coventry Cathedral in 1962.

In 1954, he played English horn in a recording of Warlock's song cycle The Curlew. In 1964 he performed in a recording of Benjamin Britten's opera Albert Herring, conducted by the composer. In 1965, Graeme recorded Bach's cantatas Herr, deine Augen sehen nach dem Glauben, BWV 102 and Süßer Trost, mein Jesus kömmt, BWV 151 with the English Chamber Orchestra (ECO) conducted by Britten and soloists Janet Baker, Peter Pears and Dietrich Fischer-Dieskau.

In 1968, Graeme took part in a recording of Bach's Brandenburg Concertos with the ECO conducted by Britten. Also with the English Chamber Orchestra and flutist Richard Adeney he recorded works of Gustav Holst, such as A Fugal Concerto for Flute, Oboe and Strings, op. 40/2, conducted by the composers daughter Imogen Holst at the 1969 Aldeburgh Festival. Both in 1971 and 1972, he played in a recording of Bach's St John Passion with Peter Pears as the Evangelist, Gwynne Howell as the Vox Christi, and the ECO conducted by Britten. In 1972, he also recorded Britten's opera The Turn of the Screw. In 1982, he participated in a recording of the Octet op. 67 of Egon Wellesz with the members of the Melos Ensemble Hugh Maguire and Nicholas Ward (violin), Patrick Ireland (viola), Terence Weil (cello), William Waterhouse (bassoon), Thea King (clarinet), and Timothy Brown (horn).

Graeme was a teacher at the Royal Northern College of Music, among his students is Robin Williams.

Graeme died at home in Shaftesbury on 1 March 2012.

== Recordings with the Melos Ensemble ==
Graeme recorded chamber music with the Melos Ensemble, its principal players Richard Adeney and William Bennett (flute), Gervase de Peyer (clarinet), Sarah Barrington (oboe), Neill Sanders (horn), William Waterhouse (bassoon), Emanuel Hurwitz and Ivor McMahon (violin), Cecil Aronowitz (viola), Terence Weil (cello), Osian Ellis (harp) and Lamar Crowson (piano).

This included works for a large ensemble of both woodwinds and strings, for which the Melos Ensemble was founded.

- Beethoven: Wind Octet
- Schubert: Octet
- Janáček: Mládí
- Nikos Skalkottas: Octet
- Gordon Crosse: Concerto Da Camera
- Harrison Birtwistle: Tragoedia
- Peter Maxwell Davies: Leopardi Fragments

Graeme also recorded chamber music for smaller formations, such as the oboe quintet of Arthur Bliss, dedicated to Léon Goossens.

- Beethoven: Quintet for piano and winds, Rondino in E flat major, WoO 25
- Nielsen: Wind Quintet
- Francis Poulenc: Trio for Oboe, Bassoon & Piano
- Jean Françaix: Divertissement for Oboe, Clarinet & Bassoon
- Arthur Bliss: Conversations for Flute, Oboe and String Trio, Quintet for Oboe and Strings
