= Clarinet Quintet (disambiguation) =

A clarinet quintet is a chamber ensemble made up of a clarinet and four other instruments, usually a string quartet, or a piece of music written for such an ensemble.

Clarinet quintet or Quintet for clarinet and strings may also refer to:

- Clarinet Quintet (Brahms), op. 115, an 1891 composition by Johannes Brahms
- Clarinet Quintet (Mozart), K. 581, a 1789 composition by Wolfgang Amadeus Mozart
- Clarinet Quintet (Täglichsbeck), Op. 44, is a composition by Thomas Täglichsbeck
- Quintet for clarinet and strings (Moore), a 1946 composition by Douglas Moore
- Quintet for Clarinet, Bass Clarinet and String Trio (Simpson), a 1981 composition by Robert Simpson
- Clarinet Quintet (Widmann), a 2017 composition by Jörg Widmann
