= Ivor McMahon =

English violinist (1924–1972)

- Born: 1924
- Died: 1972 (aged 47–48)
- Occupation: Classical violinist
- Organizations: Philharmonia Orchestra; Melos Ensemble; Royal College of Music

Ivor McMahon (1924–1972) was an English violinist. He played with notable orchestras including the Philharmonia Orchestra and the English Chamber Orchestra and is best known for playing second violin in the Melos Ensemble.

== Career ==
In 1947 McMahon was the first recipient of the Eda Kersey Memorial Exhibition, established after the death of Eda Kersey to assist a gifted young violinist each year. He played with the Philharmonia Orchestra from 1952, conducted by Arturo Toscanini. In 1955 he took part in the orchestra's tour of the United States, conducted by Herbert von Karajan. Ivor McMahon played second violin in the Melos Ensemble and participated with the group in the premiere of the War Requiem by Benjamin Britten, conducted by the composer. As a member of the English Chamber Orchestra he took part in Britten's chamber operas Albert Herring and Noye's Fludde. With violinist Emanuel Hurwitz and harpsichordist Charles Spinks he recorded concertos of Charles Avison. From 1950 until his death he was married to British violinist Nona Liddell, former leader of the London Sinfonietta; they had a daughter.

== Recordings with the Melos Ensemble ==
McMahon recorded chamber music with the Melos Ensemble, its principal players Richard Adeney and William Bennett (flute), Gervase de Peyer (clarinet), Peter Graeme (oboe), Neill Sanders and James Buck (horn), William Waterhouse (bassoon), Emanuel Hurwitz, Kenneth Sillito and Iona Brown (violin), Cecil Aronowitz and Kenneth Essex (viola), Terence Weil and Keith Harvey (cello), Adrian Beers (double bass), Osian Ellis and Hilary Wilson (harp) and Lamar Crowson (piano).

This included works for a large ensemble of both woodwinds and strings, for which the Melos Ensemble was founded.

- Beethoven: Sextet for two horns and string quartet, Op. 81b
- Mendelssohn: Octet
- Schubert: Octet
- Louis Spohr: Double Quartet No. 1 in D minor, Op. 65
- Janáček: Concertino
- Ravel: Introduction and Allegro
- Jean Françaix: Divertissement
- Nikos Skalkottas: Octet
- Sergei Prokofiev: Overture on Hebrew Themes
- Harrison Birtwistle: Tragoedia

In Françaix's Divertissement for bassoon and string quintet (1942), played with bassoonist William Waterhouse, to whom the piece is dedicated. McMahon also recorded chamber music for smaller formations, such as the clarinet quintets of Mozart, Brahms, Weber, Reger and Bliss, with clarinettist Gervase de Peyer.

- Mozart: Clarinet Quintet
- Brahms: Clarinet Quintet
- Carl Maria von Weber: Clarinet Quintet
- Max Reger: Clarinet Quintet
- Arthur Bliss: Quintet for Oboe and Strings, Quintet for Clarinet and Strings
