= List of compositions by Jörg Widmann =

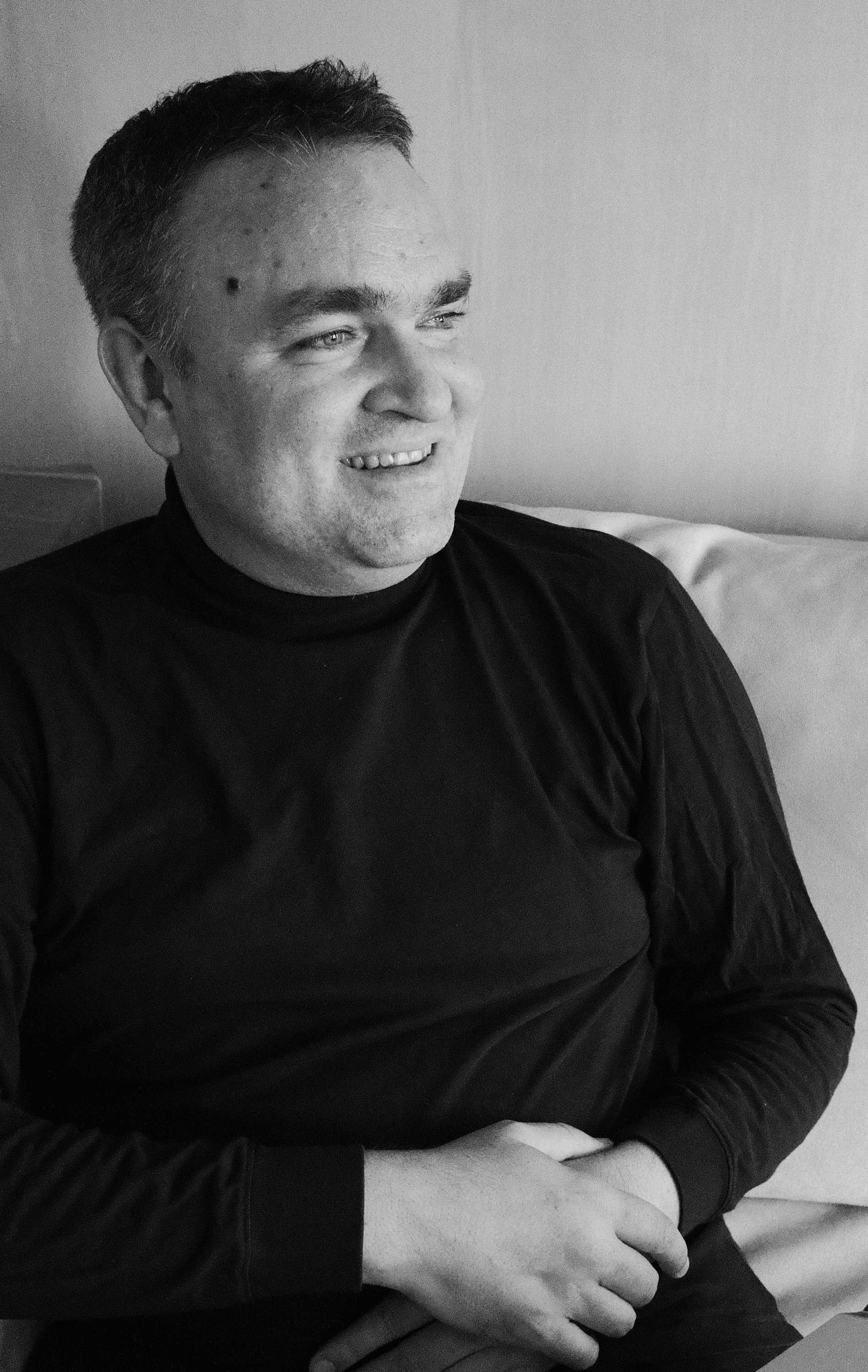
Widmann in 2025

This is a complete list of compositions by Jörg Widmann, arranged in chronological order by year of composition.

== Works ==
Widmann's works are published by Schott Music. (Note: Schott Music's catalogue List of Published Works is sorted by genre.) IRCAM has a list of Widmann's works.

=== 1990s ===
- Absences, Schuloper (1990)
- Kreisleriana, concert piece for violin and chamber orchestra (1993) (withdrawn)
- Fantasie for Solo Clarinet (1993)
- 180 beats per minute for string sextet (1993)
- Tränen der Musen (Tears of the Muses) for clarinet, violin, and piano (1993)
- Étude I for violin solo (1995)
- Fleurs du mal, a piano sonata (1996–97)
- Insel der Sirenen (Island of the Sirens) for solo violin and 19 strings (1997)
- Sieben Abgesänge auf eine tote Linde (Seven Poems from a Dead Linde Tree) for soprano, clarinet, violin and piano (1997)
- Arlechino Rabbioso for barrel organ (1997)
- String Quartet No. 1 (1997)
- Five Fragments for clarinet and piano (1997)
- Duell (Duel) for trombone and electric guitar (1998)
- Nachtstück (Nightpiece) for piano, clarinet and cello (1998)
- Wandrers Nachtlied (Wanderer's Nightsong) for soprano and five instruments (1999)
- Ikarische Klage (Icanian Lament) for 10 strings (1999)
- Fever Fantasy for piano, string quartet and clarinet (with bass clarinet) (1999)
- ...umdüstert... (...gloomy...) for chamber ensemble (1999–2000)
- Dunkle Saiten (Dark Strings) for cello, two female voices, and orchestra (1999–2000)

=== 2000s ===
- Passacaglia for violin, cello, and piano (2000)
- Implosion for orchestra (2001)
- Étude II for violin solo (2001)
- Lichtstudie I (Light Study I) for orchestra (2001)
- Polyphone Schatten (Lichtstudie II) (Polyphonic Shadows (Light Study II)) for viola, clarinet, and orchestral groups (2001)
- Monologe für zwei (Monologue for two) two theater pieces for actor, female voice, and ensemble (2002)
- Étude III for violin solo (2002)
- ad absurdum for trumpet and small orchestra (2002)
- Free Pieces for ensemble (2002)
- Toccata for piano (2002)
- Signale (Signals) for six voices (2003)
- String Quartet No. 2 "Choralquartett (Chorale Quartet)" (2003), for flute, oboe, bassoon, celesta (ad lib.) and string orchestra (2019)
- Hallstudie (Reverberation Study) for piano (2003)
- Das Gesicht im Spiegel (The Face in the Mirror), opera in 16 scenes, libretto by Roland Schimmelpfennig (2003)
- String Quartet No. 3 "Jagdquartett (Hunting Quartet)" (2003)
- Lied for orchestra (2003)
- Chor for orchestra (2004)
- Skeleton for percussion (2004)
- Light Studies (I-VI) for violin, viola, accordion, clarinet, piano and orchestra (2004)
- Octet for clarinet, horn, bassoon, 2 violins, viola, cello and double bass (2004)
- String Quartet No. 4 (2004–05)
- String Quartet No. 5 "Versuch über die Fuge (An Attempt on a Fugue)" (2005), for soprano, oboe and chamber orchestra (2015)
- Sphinxensprüche und Rätselkanons (Sphinx Sayings and Riddle Canons) for soprano, clarinet, and piano (2005)
- Messe for full orchestra (2005)
- Air for horn solo (2005)
- Labyrinth for 48 chordophones (2005)
- Elegy for clarinet and orchestra (2006)
- Echo-Fragments for clarinet and orchestral groups (2006)
- Étude IV for violin solo (2006)
- Second Labyrinth for orchestral groups (2006)
- Quintet for oboe, clarinet, bassoon, horn, and piano (2006)
- Armonica for glass harmonica and orchestra (2006)
- Elf Humoresken (Eleven Humoresques) for piano (2007)
- Violin Concerto (2007)
- Con brio for orchestra (2008)
- Étude V "Hommage à Niccolò Paganini" for violin solo (2008)
- Antiphon for orchestral groups (2008)
- 24 Duos for violin and cello (2008)
- Am Anfang, music for Anselm Kiefer production (2009) (withdrawn)
- Oboe Concerto (2009)
- Idyll & Abgrund, six Schubert reminiscences for piano (2009)
- Teiresias for six double basses (2009)
- Dubairische Tänze (Dubaian Dances) for ensemble (2009)
- Teufel Amor, a symphonic hymn after Schiller (2009, rev. 2011)

=== 2010s ===
- Liebeslied (Love Song) for eight instruments (2010)
- Étude VI "Wiegenlied für Salome (A Lullaby for Salome)" for violin solo (2010)
- Flûte en suite for flute and orchestral groups (2011)
- Babylon, opera in 7 scenes, libretto by Peter Sloterdijk (2011–2012, rev. 2018)
- Zirkustänze (Circus Dances) for piano (2012)
- Drei Schattentänze (Three Shadow Dances) for clarinet (2013)
- Das heiße Herz, Lieder cycle for baritone and piano (2013, rev. 2015),
- Third Labyrinth for soprano and orchestral groups (2013–2014)
- Trauermarsch (Funeral March) for piano and orchestra (2014)
- Babylon-Suite for large orchestra (2014)
- Viola Concerto (2015)
- Aria for strings (2015)
- Es war einmal...(Once upon a time...), five pieces in fairy-tale style for clarinet, viola and piano (2015)
- ARCHE, oratorio for soloists, choirs, organ and orchestra (2016)
- Sonatina facile for piano (2016)
- Clarinet Quintet (2017)
- Partita, five reminiscences for large orchestra (2017–2018)
- Tanz auf den Vulkan (Dance on the Volcano) for orchestra (2018)
- Violin Concerto No. 2 (2018)
- Study on Beethoven (String Quartet No. 6) (2019)
- Study on Beethoven II, III, IV, V (String Quartet No. 7, 8, 9, 10 Cavatina) (2019–2020)
- Labyrinth IV for soprano and ensemble (2019)
- Zeitensprünge (Leaps in Time), 450 bars for orchestra (2019, rev. 2020)

=== 2020s ===
- empty space for five players (flute, clarinet, percussion, piano and violin) (2020)
- Labyrinth V for soprano solo (2021)
- Towards Paradise (Labyrinth VI) for trumpet and orchestra (2021)
- 7 Capricci for saxophone quartet (2021)
- Tartaros (Labyrinth VII) for 13 instruments (2022)
- Danse macabre for orchestra (2022)
- Bunte Blätter (Coloured Leaves) for two pianos (2022)
- 5 Albumblätter (5 Album leaves) for cello and orchestra (2022)
- Variations on "El cant dels ocells", A fantasy for choir and organ (2022)
- Friedenskantate for soli, choir, organ and orchestra (2023)
- ..und wenn wir uns mitten im Leben meinen.., Torso for 2 violins and piano (2023)
- The Last Rose of Summer, A farewell song for viola and small orchestra (2023)
- Schumannliebe (Love to Schumann), a fantasy for baritone and ensemble (2023)
- Horn Concerto (2023–2024)
- Cantata in tempore belli (Cantata in time of war) for alto, narrator, chorus, organ, and orchestra (2024)
- Ètude VII "Jupiter-Etüde" for violin solo (2025)

=== Cadenzas ===
- Cello Concerto No. 1 (Haydn) (2002)
- Violin Concerto No. 3 (Mozart) (2006)
- Violin Concerto (Beethoven) (2020)

=== Arrangements ===
- Das heiße Herz, Lieder cycle for baritone and orchestra (2018)

For the Irish Chamber Orchestra:

- String Quartet No. 5 "Versuch über die Fuge (Experiment on a Fugue)" for soprano, oboe and chamber orchestra (2015)
- Clarinet Sonata (Mendelssohn): Andante for clarinet, string orchestra, harp and celestra (2016)
- String Quartet No. 2 "Choralquartett (Chorale Quartet)" for flute, oboe, bassoon, celesta (ad lib.) and string orchestra (2019)

== Discography ==
- Lied, Jonathan Nott, Bamberg Symphony (Tudor Records 2005) OCLC 611603551
- String Quartets, Leipzig String Quartet (MDG 2008) OCLC 264061853 DNB-IDN 99046881X
- Violin Concerto, Antiphon, Insel der Sirenen, Christian Tetzlaff, Daniel Harding, Swedish Radio Symphony Orchestra (Ondine 2013) OCLC 873708853
- String Quartet No. 3 (Hunting Quartet) (with Haydn and Schubert Quartets), Ragazze Quartet (Channel Classics 2013)
- Armonica, Antiphon, Souvenir bavarois, Paavo Järvi, Frankfurt Radio Symphony Orchestra (Pan Classics 2014) OCLC 900760311
- Con brio (with Beethoven: Symphony No. 7 & 8), Mariss Jansons, Bavarian Radio Symphony Orchestra (BR-Klassik 2015) This CD edition was awarded the Choc Classica 2013. OCLC 1017093816
- String Quartets, Minguet Quartet (Wergo 2015) OCLC 912578107 DNB-IDN 1071417029
- Viola Concerto, Duos, Hunting Quartet, Antoine Tamestit, Signum Quartet, Daniel Harding, Bavarian Radio Symphony Orchestra (Harmonia Mundi 2018) OCLC 1029675535
- Arche, Marlis Petersen, Thomas E. Bauer, Iveta Apkalna, Kent Nagano, Philharmonisches Staatsorchester Hamburg (ECM 2018) OCLC 1082269254 DNB-IDN 1169313981
- Diabelli Variation (with Beethoven, et al.: The Diabelli Project), Rudolf Buchbinder, (Deutsche Grammophon 2020) DNB-IDN 1206130784
- Cadenza, Beethoven, Ludwig van; London Symphony Orchestra; Eberle, Veronika; Rattle, Simon (2023), Violin Concerto (in undetermined language), London Symphony Orchestra, OCLC 1374672352
- Schumann, Robert; Widmann, Jörg; Immler, Christian; Frese, Andreas (2022), Das heiße Herz (in German), [France]: Alpha, OCLC 1347276214, Diapason d'Or
- 7 Capricci, Widmann, Jörg; Mendelssohn-Bartholdy, Felix; Bach, Johann Sebastian; Hensel, Fanny Mendelssohn; Kebyart Ensemble (2023), Traum der Jugend (in no linguistic content), Linn Records, OCLC 1413473095
- Zirkustänze, Vinnitskaya, Anna (2024), Piano dances (in no linguistic content), [Köln]: Alpha Classics, OCLC 1455473785
- Idyll und Abgrund, Inbar, Yehuda (2019), Yehuda Inbar, piano (in no linguistic content), [München]: OehmsClassics Musikproduktion GmbH, OCLC 1189972589
- Humoresken, Schumann, Robert; Widmann, Jörg; Pilsan, Aaron (2024), Schumann – Widmann (in no linguistic content), [Pays-Bas], [France]: Channel classics, Outhere music France, OCLC 1419705737
- Humoresken, Widmann, Jörg; Schulze, Jan Philip (2013), Widmann, J.: Piano Music, Hong Kong: Naxos Digital Services US Inc, OCLC 885063732
- Study on Beethoven (String Quartet No. 6), Widmann, Jörg; Mutter, Anne-Sophie; Choi, Ye-Eun; Razavi, Muriel; Ferrández, Pablo (2026), East Meets West, Alpha Classics 5 de Diapason

=== Recordings as clarinetist ===
- Tüür, Erkki-Sven; Tali, Anu; Widmann, Jörg; Widmann, Carolin; Nordic Symphony Orchestra (2010), Strata (in German), Gräfelfing, Berlin: ECM-Records-Verlag Universal Music, Vertrieb, OCLC 1184264664
- Rihm: Vier Studien zu einem Klarinettenquintett, Vier Male, Jörg Widmann, Minguet Quartet (Ars Musici 2004) OCLC 669794083 DNB-IDN 1000089258
- Rihm: Music for Clarinet and Orchestra, Jörg Widmann, Sylvain Cambreling, SWR Sinfonieorchester Baden-Baden und Freiburg (SWRmusic 2010) DNB-IDN 1021589934
- Elegie, Messe, Five Fragments, Jörg Widmann, Heinz Holliger, Christoph Poppen, Deutsche Radio Philharmonie Saarbrücken Kaiserslautern (ECM 2011) OCLC 811010552
- Brahms: Clarinet Quintet, Jörg Widmann, Hagen Quartet (Myrios 2012) OCLC 780338039
- Mozart: Clarinet Quintet, Jörg Widmann, Arcanto Quartet (Harmonia Mundi 2013) OCLC 858636943 DNB-IDN 1053667884
- Three Shadow Dances (with Mozart: Clarinet Concerto, Weber: Clarinet Concerto No. 1), Jörg Widmann, Peter Ruzicka, Deutsches Symphonie-Orchester Berlin (Orfeo 2016) OCLC 987206225 DNB-IDN 1108305768
- Once upon a time... (with Schumann: Märchenerzählungen), Tabea Zimmermann, Jörg Widmann, Dénes Várjon (Myrios 2016) Opus Klassik 2018, ICMA Winner 2019 – Chamber music, Diapason d'Or de l'Année 2018 Winner – Musique de chambre OCLC 1020860630 DNB-IDN 1153910527
- Polyphonic Shadows (Light Study II), Third Labyrinth, Sarah Wegener, Christophe Desjardins, Jörg Widmann, Heinz Holliger, Emilio Pomárico, WDR Symphony Orchestra Cologne (Wergo 2018) OCLC 1057312227 DNB-IDN 116311118X
- Intermezzi, Brahms Clarinet Sonatas, András Schiff, Jörg Widmann (ECM New Series 2020) OCLC 1195927027 Opus Klassik – Chamber music recording of the year
- Mozart, Wolfgang Amadeus; Widmann, Jörg; Naxos Digital Services US (2023), MOZART, W.A.: Clarinet Quintet / WIDMANN, J.: Clarinet Quintet (J. Widmann, Hagen Quartet), Hong Kong: Naxos Digital Services US Inc, OCLC 9941818718
- Weber, Carl Maria von; Widmann, Jörg; Kozhukhin, Denis; Irish Chamber Orchestra (2020), Clarinet quintet (in no linguistic content), [Paris]: Alpha Classics, OCLC 1245680932
- Rihm, Wolfgang; Stefanovich, Tamara; Zimmermann, Tabea; Widmann, Jörg; Gerhaher, Christian; Dodds, Stanley; Bayriske Radios Symfoniorkester (München) (2022), Sphäre nach Studie, BRmedia Service, OCLC 1333198468
- Andre, Mark (2019), ...selig sind... : für Klarinette und Elektronik (2016–18) (in no linguistic content), Leipzig: Edition Peters, OCLC 1140940908

=== Recordings as conductor ===
- ad absurdum (with Mendelssohn: Symphonien No. 1 & 4), Sergei Nakariakov, Jörg Widmann, Irish Chamber Orchestra (Orfeo 2016) OCLC 951959523 DNB-IDN 1108304117
- Experiment on a Fugue (with Mendelssohn: Symphony No. 5 "Reformation"), Mojca Erdmann, Jörg Widmann, Irish Chamber Orchestra (Orfeo 2017) OCLC 1001724242 DNB-IDN 113661592X
- 180 beats per minute, Fantasie (with Mendelssohn: Symphony No. 3 "Scottish", The Hebrides), Jörg Widmann, Irish Chamber Orchestra (Orfeo 2018) OCLC 1036343010 DNB-IDN 1159663742
- Widmann, Jörg; Chenna, Diego; Strauss, Richard; Beethoven, Ludwig van; Irish Chamber Orchestra (2021), Con brio (in no linguistic content), Alpha, OCLC 1288447794
- Widmann, Jörg; Mendelssohn Bartholdy, Felix; Schumann, Robert; Junge Deutsche Philharmonie (2019). Jörg Widmann conducts the Junge Deutsche Philharmonie : from the Philharmonie Berlin = Jörg Widmann dirigiert die Junge Deutsche Philharmonie (in no linguistic content). Berlin: Berlin Phil Media. OCLC 1047888215.
- Mendelssohn, Felix : Sinfonia No. 10 / Widmann, J.: Ikarische Klage / Korngold, E.W.: Symphonic Serenade (Stuttgart Chamber Orchestra, Widmann) (in undetermined language), Naxos Digital Services US Inc, 2025, OCLC 1545254359
- Widmann, Jörg; Mozart, Wolfgang Amadeus; Mendelssohn Bartholdy, Felix; Schumann, Robert; Irish Chamber Orchestra (2026). Invitation (in no linguistic content). Pentatone.
