= Introduction and Allegro (Ravel) =

Chamber composition by Maurice Ravel

- by Maurice Ravel
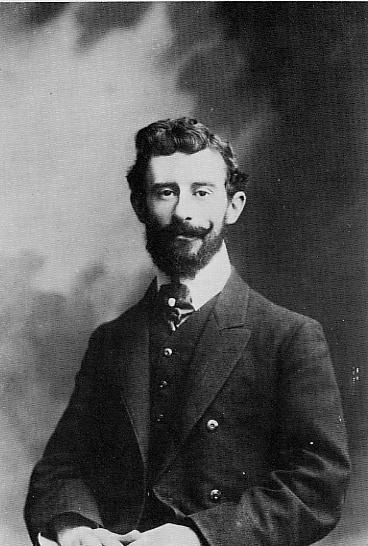
- Maurice Ravel in 1907
- Native name: Introduction et allegro
- Key: G♭ major
- Catalogue: M. 56
- Composed: May 1905
- Dedication: Albert Blondel
- Published: 22 February 1907
- Scoring: harp; flute; clarinet; string quartet

Introduction and Allegro for Harp, Flute, Clarinet and String Quartet (Introduction et allegro pour harpe, flûte, clarinette et quatuor) is a chamber work by Maurice Ravel. It is a short piece, typically lasting between ten and eleven minutes in performance. It was commissioned in 1905 by the Érard harp manufacturers to showcase their instruments, and has been described as a miniature harp concerto. The premiere was in Paris on 22 February 1907.

The work has been arranged for piano and for large orchestral forces but the version for seven instruments is usually performed, and has been recorded many times. Harpists who have featured in recordings include Lily Laskine, Nicanor Zabaleta, Osian Ellis, Markus Klinko, Lavinia Meijer and Marie-Pierre Langlamet.

== Background ==
To showcase its new chromatic harp, the Pleyel company commissioned Claude Debussy in 1904 to write his Danses sacrée et profane for harp and orchestra. The rival Érard company responded by commissioning Maurice Ravel to write a piece to display the expressive range of its double-action pedal harp. (Note: According to M. D. Calvocoressi, another commission from Érard at about the same time was for Fauré's D♭ Impromptu for Harp, Op. 86; in his 1991 study of Fauré, Jean-Michel Nectoux makes no mention of Érard in connection with the piece.)

Ravel completed his Introduction and Allegro for a septet of harp, flute, clarinet and string quartet in May 1905, dedicating it to Albert Blondel, director of Maison Érard. For Ravel, composition was generally slow and painstaking, but he wrote the Introduction and Allegro at what for him was breakneck speed, to complete it before embarking on a boating holiday with friends. He wrote at the time:

I was terribly busy during the few days which preceded my departure, because of a piece for the harp commissioned by the Érard Company. A week of frantic work and 3 sleepless nights enabled me to finish it, for better or worse. Right now, I am relaxing on a marvellous trip.

On 23 July 1906, he received 100 francs from Durand for the sale of the score.

== Premiere and early performances ==
The premiere was given on 22 February 1907 at an all-Ravel concert presented by the Cercle Musical at the Hôtel de la Société française de photographie in Paris. (Note: The other works included the String Quartet and the Histoires naturelles.) The players were Micheline Kahn (harp), Philippe Gaubert (flute), Ernest Pichard (clarinet), and the Quartet Firmin Touche; the performance was conducted by Charles Domergue.

The British premiere was on 4 September 1907 at a Henry Wood Promenade concert, with Alfred Kastner as harp soloist. Ravel later conducted the work in Britain, first at the Bechstein Hall, London, in December 1913, with Gwendolen Mason as harpist, and in concerts of his works at both the Aeolian Hall, London and the town hall, Oxford in October 1928.

The work was premiered in Belgium on 25 March 1922 with Mireille Flour and Quatuor Zimmer in Brussels at the first-known Ravel festival.

The American premiere was at Aeolian Hall in New York on 3 December 1916 in a concert featuring the harpist Carlos Salzedo, who gave the American premiere of Debussy's Danses sacrée et profane in the same programme. At the first performance in Australia, at the Conservatorium Hall, Sydney, in November 1917, the piece was so enthusiastically received that it had to be immediately repeated.

== Music ==
Introduction and Allegro for Harp, Flute, Clarinet and String Quartet
Performed by the United States Marine Band in 2022

The full title of the work in the published score gives primacy to the harp: "Introduction et Allegro pour Harpe avec accompagnement de Quatuor à Cordes, Flûte et Clarinette". Although some commentators have emphasised the chamber nature of the piece, and challenged the view of it as a concertante work, the Ravel scholar Arbie Orenstein writes, "Ravel apparently wished to stress the privileged position of the harp, and the composition should thus be considered a miniature harp concerto rather than a septet".

=== Structure ===
Opening bars of the Introduction

The work is in G♭ major. It typically plays for between ten and eleven minutes. (Note: Representative timings from versions listed in the Recordings section: Stockton: 10m:42s; Kanga: 10:34; Klinko: 10:58; Jones: 10:20) The opening is marked Très lent and expressif, the metronome mark is ♩ = 40 and the time signature is 4/4. The 26-bar introduction presents three themes – the first two for woodwinds and the third for cello – which reappear in the allegro. The piece opens with a pianissimo duet for the flute and clarinet. The strings enter in the third bar, pianissimo, and the harp enters in the fourth with a wide-ranging arpeggio.

The cello introduces a broad melody against the shimmering pianissimo of the violins, flute, and clarinet. After ten bars, the time changes to 3/4 and the marking to moins lent. The movement becomes faster and louder, and subsides to pianissimo again, bringing the introduction to its conclusion.

The allegro, in sonata form, follows without a break. It opens with a harp solo. The flute takes up the melody, to the accompaniment of the violins pizzicato and the other strings arco. The melody is passed from one instrument to another; the music gradually grows louder until a fortissimo climax is reached. The themes are further developed or compressed, with a cadenza for the harp, which precedes the recapitulation.

The harp returns to the first theme of the allegro section, with the accompaniment of trills by strings and woodwinds. The melody passes from instrument to instrument, the music becoming louder and softer again, with short interludes for the harp solo. The principal melody is given in variation form in the harp, accompanied by pizzicato strings, leading to an animated and fortissimo conclusion.

=== Arrangements ===
During Ravel's lifetime, his publisher, Durand et cie, issued, in addition to the original score, arrangements of the Introduction and Allegro for solo piano (by J. Charlot), piano four hands (by L. Roques), two pianos (by the composer), and harp and piano (by the composer). Ravel was not averse to having the piece played by ensembles larger than a septet. In a letter to Désiré-Émile Inghelbrecht in February 1911 he wrote:

It is not, properly speaking, a piece for orchestra. There are 7 instruments in all. But it could be arranged: the string quartet could be doubled, or even tripled. And, with the exception of several solos, it would sound even better than the original.

Several recordings of the work have the string parts expanded from quartet to full string orchestra.

== Critical reception ==
For sheer amiability and relaxed sensuousness, no work by Ravel surpasses his Introduction et allegro.

— Mark de Voto,
The Cambridge Companion to Ravel, 2011

Comparing Debussy's 1904 Danses sacrée et profane with Ravel's piece commissioned in response, the critic Mark de Voto comments that the former are "restrained and even austere, but no less sensuous in their subtlety, without so much as a hint of the harp’s most characteristic gesture, the glissando", whereas Ravel's is "a brilliant virtuoso piece" with "a lushness of colour" and "a remarkably full instrumental sound".

In a 2011 study, Roger Nichols comments that although Ravel had described the piece as finished "for better or for worse", the musical public "has long decided that it was 'for better'". In Nichols's view the work, from an aesthetic point of view, is a minor one but inhabits an "original and beautiful sound-world" and technically represents an advance on the String Quartet premiered the year before the composition of the Introduction and Allegro.

In his 2012 book Ravel the Decadent, Michael Puri interprets the Introduction and Allegro as "a scene of reanimation" – in the words of another analyst, Jessie Fillerup, "a dawn that heralds renewal while pointing toward the inevitable dusk". Puri considers the music to be the closest relation in Ravel's works to the ballet Daphnis et Chloé, commissioned in 1909.

== Recordings ==
The composer directed an early recording of the work in London in 1923, with an ensemble comprising Gwendolen Mason, harp; Robert Murchie, flute; Haydn Draper, clarinet; and a string quartet led by George Woodhouse. The commentator Robert Philip comments that the recording lasts nine and a half minutes, substantially less than most later recordings, and "the Allegro sounds very fast to modern listeners (by comparison, a 1938 recording by Lily Laskine and the Calvet Quartet, for example, lasts just under eleven minutes)". (Note: The recording evidently reflects Ravel's preferred tempo rather than the constraints of the playing time of 78 rpm records: Philip notes that there was ample unused space on the discs to accommodate a slower tempo had Ravel wished it.)

Among the many subsequent recordings are:

Year	Harp	Flute	Clarinet	Strings	Conductor	Reference
1928	John Cockerill	Robert Murchie	Charles Draper	Virtuoso Quartet (Note: Marjorie Hayward, Edwin Virgo, Raymond Jeremy, Cedric Sharpe)		
1931	Denise Herbrecht	unnamed ensemble			Piero Coppola	
1938	Lily Laskine	Marcel Moyse	Ulysse Delécluse	Quatuor Calvet		
1952	Phia Berghout	Amsterdam Chamber Music Society				
1955	Ann Mason Stockton	Arthur Cleghorn	Mitchell Lurie	Hollywood String Quartet		
1955	Lily Laskine	Jean-Pierre Rampal	Ulysse Delécluse	Pascal String Quartet		
1958	Nicanor Zabaleta	Berlin Radio Symphony Orchestra			Ferenc Fricsay	
1962	Osian Ellis	Richard Adeney	Gervase de Peyer	Melos Ensemble string quartet (Note: Emanuel Hurwitz, Ivor McMahon, Cecil Aronowitz, Terence Weil)		
1965	Nicanor Zabaleta	Christian Lardé	Guy Deplus	Monique Frasca-Colombier, Marguerite Vidal, Anka Moraver, Hamisa Dor		
1968	Edward Druzinsky	Donald Peck	Clark Brody	Chicago Symphony Orchestra	Jean Martinon	
1969	Osian Ellis	Richard Adeney	Gervase de Peyer	Melos Ensemble string quartet		
1970	Marisa Robles	Christopher Hyde-Smith	Thea King	Delmé Quartet		
1978	David Watkins	William Bennett	Tom Kelly	National Philharmonic Orchestra	Charles Gerhardt	
1983	Marisa Robles	Christopher Hyde-Smith	Thea King	Allegri Quartet		
1987	Skaila Kanga	Academy of St Martin in the Fields Chamber Ensemble				
1989	Éva Maros	Zoltán Győngyőssy	Béla Kovács	Kodály Quartet		
1989	Adelheid Blovsky-Miller	Wolfgang Dünschede	Karl Leister	Ensemble Wien-Berlin		
1992	Erica Goodman	Suzanne Shulman	Stanley McCartney	Amadeus Ensemble		
1993	Markus Klinko	Benoît Fromanger	Maurice Gabai	Soloists of the Orchestra de l'Opéra de Paris Bastille (Note: Frédéric Laroque, Gérard Torgomian, Pierre Lénert, Cyril Lacrouts)		
1994	Heidi Lehwalder	James Galway	Richard Stoltzman	Tokyo String Quartet		
1994	Ieuan Jones	William Bennett	James Campbell	Allegri Quartet		
1995	Isabelle Moretti	Michel Moraguès	Pascal Moraguès	Parisii Quartet		
2004	Gillian Tingay	Anna Noakes	Julian Farrell	Fibonacci Sequence		
2015	Lavinia Meijer	Amsterdam Sinfonietta				
2020	Marie-Pierre Langlamet	Emmanuel Pahud	Wenzel Fuchs	Christophe Horák, Simon Roturier, Ignacy Miecznikowski, Bruno Delepelaire		
2025	Lucy Wakeford	Philippa Davies	Richard Hosford	Stephanie Gonley, Jonathan Stone, Lars Anders, Adrian Brendel		
2025	Lavinia Meijer	Sunghyun Cho	Innhyuck Cho	Hungwei Huang, Svetlin Roussev, Sooyoung Kim, Sein Lee		

Ravel's arrangement of the piece for two pianos has been recorded by Ingryd Thorson and Julian Thurber (1988); Louis Lortie and Hélène Mercier (1990); and Tiziana Moneta and Gabriele Rota (2009). Roques's arrangement for four hands has been recorded (2019) by Valentina Fornari and Alberto Nosè.

== Notes, references and sources ==
=== Sources ===
- De Voto, Mark (24 August 2000). "Harmony in the chamber music". In Debora Mawer (ed.). Cambridge Companion to Ravel. Cambridge: Cambridge University Press. ISBN 978-0-521-64026-8.
- Durand et cie (1931). Catalogue des oeuvres de Maurice Ravel. Paris: Durand et cie. OCLC 974816803.
- Fillerup, Jessie (2021). Magician of Sound: Ravel and the Aesthetics of Illusion. Oakland: University of California Press. ISBN 978-0-520-37988-6.
- Nectoux, Jean-Michel (1991). Gabriel Fauré: A Musical Life. Roger Nichols (trans). Cambridge: Cambridge University Press. ISBN 0-521-23524-3.
- Nichols, Roger (2011). Ravel. New Haven and London: Yale University Press. ISBN 978-0-300-10882-8.
- Orenstein, Arbie (2003) [1989]. A Ravel Reader. Mineola: Dover. ISBN 978-0-486-43078-2.
- Orenstein, Arbie (2014) [1975]. Ravel: Man and Musician. Mineola: Dover. ISBN 978-0-486-26633-6.
- Philip, Robert (2004). Performing Music in the Age of Recording. New Haven: Yale University Press. ISBN 978-0-300-10246-8.
- Puri, Michael (2012). Ravel the Decadent: Memory, Sublimation, and Desire. Oxford: Oxford University Press. ISBN 978-0-19-973537-2.
- Ravel, Maurice (1905). Introduction et Allegro pour Harpe avec accompagnement de Quatuor à Cordes, Flûte et Clarinette (PDF). Paris: Durand. OCLC 1101935173.
- Sackville-West, Edward; Desmond Shawe-Taylor (1955). The Record Guide. London: Collins. OCLC 500373060.
- Slonimsky, Nicolas (2000). The Great Composers and Their Works. New York: Schirmer Books. ISBN 978-0-02-864955-9.
- Vallas, Léon (1973) [1933]. Claude Debussy, His Life and Works. New York: Dover. ISBN 978-0-486-22916-4.
- Vuillermoz, Émile (1939). "L'œuvre de Maurice Ravel". In Colette; Roger Wild (eds.). Maurice Ravel par quelques-uns de ses familiers (in French). Paris: Éditions du Tambourinaire. OCLC 1101253788.
