= Pascal Quartet =

Classical music ensemble

The Pascal Quartet was a French string quartet musical ensemble which took shape during the early 1940s and emerged after World War II to become a leading representative of the French performance tradition. It was named after its founder, the viola player Léon Pascal, and was occasionally termed the Leon Pascal Quartet.

== Personnel ==
Throughout its recording career during the 1940s and 1950s, the personnel comprised:

1st violin: Jacques Dumont

2nd violin: Maurice Crut

viola: Léon Pascal

violoncello: Robert Salles

== Origins ==
During the 1930s Léon Pascal occupied the viola desk in the celebrated Calvet Quartet, with Joseph Calvet, Daniel Guilevitch (i.e. Daniel Guilet of the Beaux Arts Trio) and Paul Mas (cello). Pascal appears in the 1931-1938 recordings made by that ensemble. The recordings of the Pascal Quartet begin before 1945. The quality of the soloists with whom they recorded attest to the standing of the Pascal Quartet. McNaught said of them that 'due praise would mean a further search for words.' Record Year 2 (p. 47-48), on the other hand, found many faults with their Beethoven cycle, which others have admired intensely.

== Recordings ==
- Beethoven: Complete string quartets: variant arrangements:

(a) Nixa 13 LPs CLP 1201-1213, Issued 1953: Includes op 2 no 3 C major (arrangement of pno sonata) coupled with op 18 no 1 (CLP 1201); Op 18 2 & 3 (CLP 1202); op 18 4 & 5 (CLP 1203); op 18 no 6 & op 95 (CLP 1204); op 59, 1, 2 & 3 (CLP 1205-1207); op 74, (CLP 1208); op 127, 130 & 131 (CLP 1209-1211); op 133 & op 135 (CLP 1212); op 132 (CLP 1213).
(b) The Classics Record Library (a division of the Book-of-the-Month Club, Inc.), on 10 LPs, released in 1957. Includes op 18 nos 1-6 (MAQ 3331-3333); Quartets nos 7-11 (MBQ 4441-4443); Quartets 12-16 and Grosse Fuge (MCQ 5551-5554).
(c) Concert Hall Society label, 10 LPs "Recorded in France": Includes op 18 1-6 (M (or MMSD) 2041-2043); op 59 1-3 (M 2044-2045); op 74 & op 95 (M 2046); op 127 & op 135 (M 2047); op 130 & Grosse Fuge op 133 (M 2048); op 131 and op 132 (M 2049 & 2050).

- Beethoven: Three Quartets for Piano and Strings, WoO 36 (Says Opus 152 on the recording), with Artur Balsam (International Recorded Music Society, Inc. LP IRMS-1215: Concert Hall Society M 2054).
- Beethoven: Quartet op 8 no 3. (1944)
- Beethoven: Quintets op 29 and op 104, with Walter Gerhard. (Nixa LP CLP 1214) (1953)
- Haydn: Quartet op 76 no 2. (1948)
- Bach: Die Kunst der Fuge, Contrapunctus no 1. (1949)
- Franck: Quintet, with Jeanne-Marie Darré (1952) (Pathé DTX 123)
- Saint-Saëns: Septet, with J-M Darré, Delmotte, Loguereau, cond. Fourestier (Pathé DTX 252)
- Mendelssohn: String Quintets op 18 no. 1 and op 87 no. 2, with Walter Gerhard (Concert Hall Society CHS 1172)
- Mozart: Quintets, with Walter Gerhard (Monitor MCS 2111)
- Prokofiev String quartet (Bertelsmann 8132, 10" LP)
- Casadesus: Nonet for piano, string quartet and wind, with Robert Casadesus and wind quartet (LP Columbia ML5448)
- Fauré: Piano Quintet no 2 in C minor op 115, with Ray Lev (piano). (1950) (Concert Hall Society LP CHS1093, Nixa LP CLP 1093)
- Schubert: Quartet in A Minor op. 29 (early 1950s?) (The Musical Masterpiece Society MMS-83, 10" LP)
- Schubert: Trout Quintet, with Vlado Perlemuter and Hans Fryba (double-bass). (Concert Hall Society LP AM 2203)
- Chausson: Concerto for violin, piano and string quartet, with Louis Kaufman and Arthur Balsam (c.1949-1952, on Nixa LP).
- Chausson: Concerto for violin, piano and string quartet, with Yehudi Menuhin and Louis Kentner. (1955)
- Ravel: Introduction and Allegro, with Lily Laskine (harp), Jean-Pierre Rampal (flute) and Ulysse Delecluse (clarinet). (1955)
- Debussy: Quartet in G minor op 10. (?c1948)

(Dumont and Pascal also appear in the Prokofiev Quintet for wind and strings, op 39, with M Goetgluck (oboe), Ulysse Delecluse (clar) and M. Boussagol (double-bass) (NIXA LP PLP 512). (c1953)).
The Debussy and Fauré recordings have been reissued recently on the Pristine Audio label, remastered from LP disc sources by Peter Harrison.

== Sources ==
- R.D. Darrell, Gramophone Shop Encyclopedia of Recorded Music (New York 1936).
- W. McNaught, Gramophone Notes, Musical Times vol 90 no 1277 (July 1949), 233-235.
- D. Ellmann, Notes to CD Teldec 28413-2 (Calvet Quartet reissue).
- D. Shawe-Taylor and Sackville-West, The Record Year 2 (Collins, London 1953).
