= Melos Ensemble =

Chamber music group founded in 1950

The Melos Ensemble is a group of musicians who started in 1950 in London to play chamber music in mixed instrumentation of string instruments, wind instruments and others. Benjamin Britten composed the chamber music for his War Requiem for the Melos Ensemble and conducted the group in the first performance in Coventry.

They should not be confused with two other chamber groups of similar name, the Melos Quartet or the Melos Art Ensemble (an Italian group).

== Founding period, 1950 ==
The Melos Ensemble was founded by musicians who wanted to play chamber music scored for a larger ensemble in a combination of strings, winds and other instruments with the quality of musical rapport only regular groups can achieve. The Melos Ensemble played in variable instrumentation, flexible enough to perform a wide repertory of pieces. All its members were excellent musicians who held positions in notable orchestras and appeared as soloists. The founding members, namely Gervase de Peyer (clarinet), Cecil Aronowitz (viola), Richard Adeney (flute), and Terence Weil (cello) planned a group of twelve players, a string quintet and a wind quintet with harp and piano, that might be expanded by other players, to perform the great octets by Schubert and Mendelssohn, the septet by Beethoven, Ravel's Introduction and Allegro and the Serenade by Arnold Schoenberg. Neill Sanders (horn, a member for 29 years until 1979), Paul Beaumont Draper (bassoon) and Adrian Beers (double bass) were members from the beginning. All these musicians stayed with the group for decades.

== Early members ==
Other early members included Gervase de Peyer (first clarinet) Emanuel Hurwitz (leader 1956–1972), Ivor McMahon (second violin), William Waterhouse (bassoon), Osian Ellis (harp), James Blades (percussion), Lamar Crowson and Ernst Ueckermann (piano), Peter Graeme and Sarah Barrington (oboe), James Buck (horn), Edgar Williams (bassoon) and Keith Puddy (clarinet), expanded by Colin Chambers (flute and piccolo), Alan Hacker (bass clarinet), Eric Roseberry (piano), Leonard Friedman (violin), Kay Hurwitz (viola), William Bennett (flute), Stephen Pruslin (piano), Leonard Friedman (violin), Hilary Wilson (harp) and Timothy Brown (horn). In the opinion of William Waterhouse (writing in 1995), "it was the remarkable rapport between this pair of lower strings" (i.e. Terence Weil and Cecil Aronowitz) "which remained constant throughout a succession of distinguished leaders, that gave a special distinction to this outstanding ensemble.", Obituary Gervase de Peyer"the Guardian"

== Special projects ==
A remarkable premiere for the group was Jacques-Louis Monod's 1962 presentation of Roberto Gerhard's Concerto for Eight. This was followed by the 1962 premiere, and subsequent 1963 recording, of Benjamin Britten's War Requiem, for which the instrumental sections accompanying the English texts had been written specifically for the Melos, and were directed by the composer in the performance. The recording received a Grammy Hall of Fame Award in 1998. In 1964 and 1965 the Melos Ensemble played several concerts at the new Wardour Castle Summer School, founded by Harrison Birtwistle, Peter Maxwell Davies and Alexander Goehr. On 16 August 1964 they played among others Monody for Corpus Christi by Birtwistle, Five Little Pieces (first performance) by Davies, and Suite Op.11 by Goehr. A chamber concert on 17 August featured the Horn Trio by Brahms, on 18 August the Quatuor pour la fin du temps by Messiaen. In 1965, the Melos Ensemble played on 16 August Pierrot Lunaire by Schoenberg. On 18 August parts of In Chymick Art, a cantata on texts by Edward Benlowes that Robin Holloway wrote for the Summer School, were performed for the first time. On 20 August they premiered two works they had commissioned, Tragoedia by Birtwistle, conducted by Lawrence Foster, and two 'In Nomine" of Seven in Nomine by Davies, conducted by the composer.

== Festivals, broadcasts, tours ==
The Melos Ensemble performed regularly at British and International Festivals, among others Warsaw, Venice, Cheltenham, Edinburgh, Bordeaux and the Aldeburgh Festival, their first US tour was in 1966. The group gave many BBC broadcasts, and made over 50 recordings, first with the publisher L'Oiseau-Lyre. Gervase de Peyer directed the extensive recording programme of the Ensemble for EMI.

== EMI recordings 1963–1973 ==
- Mozart, Brahms, Weber and Bliss Quintets
- Mozart and Beethoven, Piano and Wind Quintets
- Schubert, Octet; Beethoven, Septet and Octet for Winds
- Schumann, Fairy Tales, Fantasy Pieces
- Berwald, Septet; Nielsen, Wind Quintet
- Ravel, Introduction and Allegro for harp, flute, clarinet and string quartet
- Françaix, Divertissement; Poulenc, Sonata for Clarinet and Bassoon
- Bartók, Milhaud and Khatchaturian, Trios
- Prokofiev, Overture on Hebrew Themes
- Janáček, Concertino, Mládí
- John Ireland, Sextet, Trios, Sonatas

EMI reissued in 2011 a selection from historical recordings, titled "Melos Ensemble – Music among Friends". The principal players were Richard Adeney (and William Bennett, flute), Gervase de Peyer (and Keith Puddy, clarinet), Peter Graeme (and Sarah Barrington, oboe), Neil Sanders (and James Buck, horn), William Waterhouse (and Edgar Williams, bassoon), Emanuel Hurwitz (and Kenneth Sillito, first violin), Ivor McMahon (and Iona Brown, second violin), Cecil Aronowitz (and Kenneth Essex, viola), Terence Weil (and Keith Harvey, cello), Adrian Beers (double bass), Osian Ellis (harp) and Lamar Crowson (piano). The ensemble was expanded for single works by Christopher Hyde-Smith (flute), Anthony Jennings and Stephen Trier (bass clarinet), Barry Tuckwell (horn), David Mason and Philip Jones (trumpet), Arthur Wilson and Alfred Flaszinski (trombone), Robert Masters (violin), Manoug Parikian and Eli Goren (violin), Patrick Ireland (viola), Derek Simpson (cello), Hilary Wilson (harp), Marcal Gazelle (piano), James Blades, Tristan Fry, Jack Lees and Stephen Whittaker (percussion), and singers Mary Thomas (soprano) and Rosemary Phillips (contralto). The collection of 11 CDs contains the works for large ensemble – six to thirteen players – for which the Melos Ensemble was founded, some composed for the ensemble:

- Beethoven: Septet, Octet
- Mendelssohn: Octet
- Schubert: Octet
- Franz Berwald: Septet
- Louis Spohr: Double Quartet
- Janáček: Mládí, Concertino
- Ravel: Introduction and Allegro
- Jean Françaix: Divertissement for Bassoon and String Quintet
- Nikos Skalkottas: Octet
- Sergei Prokofiev: Overture on Hebrew Themes
- Louis Spohr: Octet
- Richard Rodney Bennett: Calendar
- Gordon Crosse: Concerto Da Camera
- Harrison Birtwistle: Tragoedia
- Peter Maxwell Davies: Leopardi Fragments

== Other selected recordings ==
- Lennox Berkeley: Sextet for clarinet, horn and string quartet (1954)
- Malcolm Arnold: Guitar Concerto, with Julian Bream RCA (1959)
- Mátyás Seiber: Three Fragments from A Portrait of the Artist as a Young Man, a Chamber Cantata for Speaker, Chorus and Eight Instruments, with Peter Pears (Speaker) / Dorian Singers / Melos Ensemble London conducted by Matyas Seiber (1960)
- Mauro Giuliani: Guitar Concerto, with Julian Bream (1961) RCA
- Schoenberg: Serenade, John Carol Case, Bruno Maderna, L'Oiseau-Lyre (1962)
- Britten: War Requiem (1963)Benjamin Britten (1913–1976) / War Requiem musicweb-international.com
- Prokofiev: Quintet in G minor for oboe, clarinet, violin, viola and double bass, Op. 39 / Shostakovich: Piano Quintet, Op. 57
- Hummel: Septet / Quintet (1966) (L'oiseau-Lyre)
- Ravel and Maurice Delage: French Songs / Chausson: Chanson Perpetuelle, with Janet Baker (1966)
- Ravel: Introduction and Allegro / Poulenc: Trio for Oboe, Bassoon and Piano / Sonata for Clarinet and Bassoon / Francaix: Divertissement for Oboe, Clarinet and Bassoon / Divertissement for Bassoon and String Quartet EMI (1969)Ravel/Poulenc/Francaix : Vinyl CDs & more At Shakedown Records Shakedown Records

== Melos Ensemble of London 1974 ==
Following the death of Ivor McMahon in 1972, and the departure of three other members, the group briefly disbanded in 1973, but was reformed in 1974 with eight of the original players. In the later period the following musicians were also among those playing for the ensemble: Hugh Maguire (violin), Thea King (clarinet, 1974–1993), Nicholas Ward (violin, from 1977), Sylvie Gazeau (principal violin for many years), Gwenneth Pryor (piano), Iona Brown (violin), Patrick Ireland (viola) and Keith Harvey (cello). In 1975 the Melos Ensemble presented its 25th anniversary concert in London. In 1982 the Melos Ensemble appeared in Graz in a retrospective of Egon Wellesz, playing his Oktett für Klarinette, Fagott, Horn und Streichquintett Op.67.

== New chamber music ==
Composers created music for unusual groupings with the Melos Ensemble specifically in mind, leading in turn to the formation of similar chamber groups. Hans Werner Henze composed Kammermusik 1958 for tenor, guitar and eight solo instruments, for example. In that way, the Melos Ensemble has directly and indirectly influenced music for new combinations of chamber musicians in contemporary music.

== Publications ==
- Entries to the Melos Ensemble in allmusic
- Entries to the Melos Ensemble in WorldCat
- Reviews in Gramophone Archive
