= Octet (Schubert) =

1824 composition for winds and strings

- by Franz Schubert
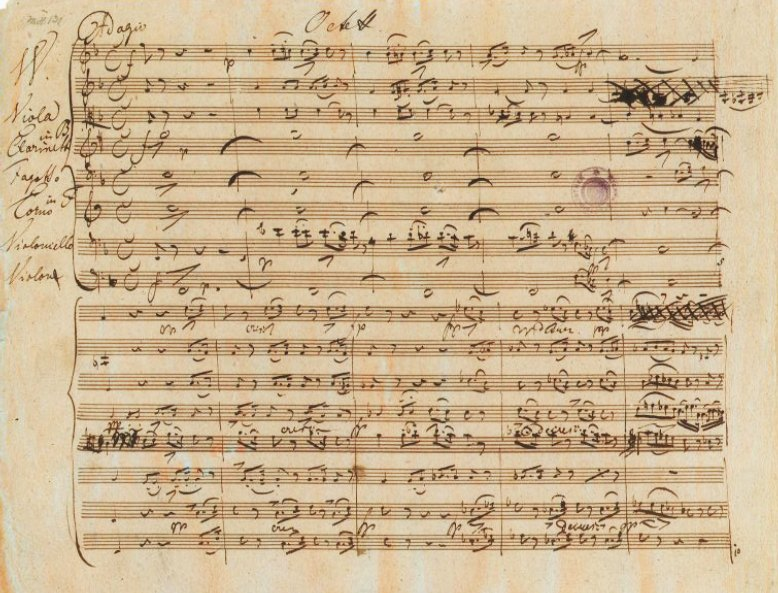
- Autograph manuscript
- Key: F major
- Catalogue: D. 803
- Commissioned by: Ferdinand Troyer
- Composed: 1824
- Performed: April 1827
- Duration: 1 hour
- Movements: 6
- Scoring: Clarinet, bassoon, horn, 2 violins, viola, cello, double bass

The Octet in F major, D. 803 was composed by Franz Schubert in March 1824. It was commissioned by the renowned clarinetist Ferdinand Troyer and came from the same period as two of Schubert's other major chamber works, the 'Rosamunde' and 'Death and the Maiden' string quartets.

== Structure ==
Consisting of six movements, the Octet takes an hour to perform.

1. Adagio – Allegro – Più allegro
2. Adagio
3. Allegro vivace – Trio – Allegro vivace
4. Andante – variations. Un poco più mosso – Più lento
5. Menuetto. Allegretto – Trio – Menuetto – Coda
6. Andante molto – Allegro – Andante molto – Allegro molto

The Octet boasts the largest scale for any chamber work by Schubert. It is scored for a clarinet, a bassoon, a horn, two violins, a viola, a cello, and a double bass. This instrumentation is similar to that of the Beethoven Septet, differing only by the addition of a second violin.

Octet D. 803
I. Adagio – Allegro

II. Adagio

III. Scherzo

IV. Andante

V. Menuetto

VI. Andante molto – Allegro
Performance on period instruments by:
- violin 1, Monica Huggett (director)
- violin 2, Rob Diggins
- viola, Vicki Gunn
- cello, Sarah Freiberg
- bass, Curtis Daily
- clarinet, William McColl
- horn, R. J. Kelley
- bassoon, Charles Kaufmann

== Background ==
In response to a reported request by Troyer for a work similar to Beethoven's Septet, Op. 20, Schubert composed the Octet in early 1824. The work was first performed at the home of Troyer's employer, the Archduke Rudolf (to whom Beethoven's Archduke Trio is dedicated) and included many of the musicians who premiered the Septet.

== Analysis ==
The basic structure of the movements is similar to those of the Septet, as are many of the key relationships between the movements and principal key (E-flat for the Septet, F major of the Octet). The fourth movement variations are based on a theme from Schubert's Singspiel Die Freunde von Salamanka.

== Recordings ==
The Pascal Quartet with Jacques Dumont, violin I, Maurice Crut, violin II, Léon Pascal, viola and Robert Salles, cello, recorded the Octet in the early 1950s for the label (Musical Masterpiece Society MMS-2219).

The Vienna Octet recorded it in 1949 for Decca.

The Melos Ensemble was founded to perform works such as the Octet for wind instruments and strings. The Octet was recorded in 1967 with Gervase de Peyer (clarinet), William Waterhouse (bassoon), Neill Sanders (horn), Emanuel Hurwitz and Ivor McMahon (violin), Cecil Aronowitz (viola), Terence Weil (cello) and Adrian Beers (double bass).

A recording of the chamber ensemble of the Academy of St Martin in the Fields with Iona Brown (violin I) and Timothy Brown (horn) won a Grand Prix du Disque.

The Camerata Freden recorded it in 2003 with Adrian Adlam (violin I), Cristiano Gualco (violin II), Michael Hesselink (clarinet), Marjolein Dispa (viola), Michel Dispa (cello), Ilka Emmert (double-bass), Letizia Viola (bassoon) and Ron Schaaper (horn).

Janine Jansen (violin I) along with Gregory Ahss (violin II), Nimrod Guez (viola), Nicolas Altstaedt (cello), Rick Stotijn (double bass), Andreas Ottensamer (clarinet), Fredrik Ekdahl (bassoon) and Radek Baborák (horn) performed, and (video) recorded, the piece at the International Chamber Music Festival 2015 in Utrecht.

Other recordings include those by Linos Ensemble (Capriccio), Mullova Ensemble (Onyx), Gaudier Ensemble (Hyperion), Isabelle Faust et al. (Harmonia Mundi), Consortium Classicum (MDG), Fibonacci Sequence (Deux-Elles), Emma Johnson and Friends (SOMM), Nash Ensemble (ASV Gold), Modigliani Quartet (Mirare), OSM Chamber Soloists (Analekta), Consort of London (Collins), Edding Quartet and Northernlight (Phi), Berlin Philharmonic Octet (Nimbus), East Side Oktett (Es Dur), Wigmore Soloists (BIS), Chamber Players of Canada (CBC), Berlin Soloists and Brandis Quartet (Teldec), and Dresdner Oktett (Profil).

== Notes ==
=== References ===
- Gibbs, Christopher (1997). The Cambridge Companion to Schubert. Cambridge Companions to Music. Cambridge University Press.
