= Timothy Brown (hornist) =

British hornist

- Born: Salisbury, England
- Education: Royal College of Music; London University
- Occupations: Classical horn player
- Organizations: Bath Festival Orchestra; BBC Symphony Orchestra; Academy of St Martin in the Fields; Melos Ensemble; Royal College of Music
- Family: Iona Brown (sister); Ian Brown (brother); Sally Brown (sister)

Timothy Brown is a British horn player, a leading chamber musician and co-principal of the Academy of St Martin in the Fields. He was a member of the Melos Ensemble in its second phase. He teaches at the Royal College of Music.

== Career ==
Timothy Brown studied at the Royal College of Music with Douglas Moore and Alan Civil.

=== Orchestra ===
Brown was principal hornist of the BBC Symphony Orchestra, working with conductors such as Igor Stravinsky, Otto Klemperer and Günter Wand, appearing at The Proms and in Carnegie Hall. He performed Britten's Serenade for Tenor, Horn and Strings with Ian Bostridge, conducted by Colin Davis.

=== Academy of St. Martin in the Fields ===
Brown has been a member of the Academy of St Martin in the Fields since 1968. As a soloist and chamber musician, he recorded with its chamber ensemble with his sister Iona Brown, Mozart's Horn Quintet. This recording was awarded the Wiener Flötenuhr prize of the Mozartgemeinde Wien. The ensemble's recording of Schubert's Octet won a Grand Prix du Disque. Brown was a soloist, together with hornists Hermann Baumann and Nicholas Hill and violinist Iona Brown, in a recording of Telemann's Concerto for 3 Horns and Violin, as well as concertos by Telemannn and Haydn for two horns with Baumann. Brown recorded Britten's Canticles together with Ian Bostridge (tenor), David Daniels (countertenor), Christopher Maltman (baritone), Aline Brewer (harp) and Julius Drake (piano). In 1999 he recorded Mozart's four horn concertos with the Academy of St Martin in the Fields, conducted by his sister.

=== Melos Ensemble ===
Brown was a member of the Melos Ensemble in its second phase. In 1982 he performed and recorded with the ensemble at the festival Steirischer Herbst the Octet Op. 67 of Egon Wellesz, with Hugh Maguire and Nicholas Ward (violin), Patrick Ireland (viola), Terence Weil (cello), William Waterhouse (bassoon), Peter Graeme (oboe) and Thea King (clarinet).

=== Natural horn ===
On the natural horn, Brown has recorded Haydn's First Horn Concerto with the Academy of Ancient Music conducted by Christopher Hogwood, and the Mozart horn concertos with the Orchestra of the Age of Enlightenment conducted by Sigiswald Kuijken.

=== Teaching ===
Timothy Brown has been teaching at the Royal College of Music. He plays an Alex 90 or 103, but also a Cornford 28, by the British maker Christopher Cornford in Germany.
