= Sylvie Gazeau =

French classical violinist (born 1950)

Sylvie Gazeau (born 30 January 1950) is a French classical violinist

== Biography ==
Born in Orléans, Gazeau began her musical studies at the Conservatory of Nice, then, on the advice of Henryk Szeryng, entered the Conservatoire de Paris. A pupil of Gabriel Bouillon and Joseph Calvet, she won there First prizes for violin (1965) and chamber music (1967).

Second prize at the Maria Canals International Music Competition (Barcelona, 1967), at the Carl Flesch competition (London, 1968), she won first prize at the Enlow competition of Evansville (1969). She then improved her skills with Josef Gingold (Performer's Certificate, Indiana University, Bloomington, 1970), whose assistant she was in his violin class.

In 1973, she won a third prize at the Montreal International Competition, before obtaining in 1979, the Georges Enesco prize of Paris, in the "Meilleure violoniste de l'année" category.

Concertmaster of the Melos Ensemble of London, she was, from 1976 to 1982, violin solo at the Ensemble intercontemporain then joined the Ivaldi Quartet. She is the regular guest of the Asolo, Naples, Festival international de musique Tibor Varga and Marlboro ("senior" since 1983) festivals and participates in various summer academies (Flaine, Les Arcs, Rambouillet, Périgueux, Portogruaro).

Since 1985, Gazeau has been a teacher of violin and chamber music at the CNSMDP. In 1998, she was appointed professor of violin didactics in the pedagogy department. She is artistic director of the Violin Vatelot-Rampal competition.

She's playing on a Stradivarius that once belonged to Christian Ferras.
