= Cecil Aronowitz =

British classical violist (1916–1978)

- Cecil Aronowitz in performance, in the 1960s
- Born: 4 March 1916; King William's Town, Cape Province, Union of South Africa
- Died: 7 September 1978 (aged 62); Ipswich, England
- Occupation: Classical viola player
- Organizations: Melos Ensemble; Royal College of Music; Royal Northern College of Music

Cecil Aronowitz (4 March 1916 – 7 September 1978) was a British viola player, a founding member of the Melos Ensemble, a leading chamber musician, and an influential teacher at the Royal College of Music and the Royal Northern College of Music.

== Career ==
Cecil Aronowitz was born on 4 March 1916 in King William's Town, South Africa. In 1933 he began studying the violin in Durban with Stirling Robbins. After two years he came to England on an overseas scholarship to study at the Royal College of Music in London. In 1939, World War 2 interrupted his studies and he spent the next six years in the army. When he returned to England, he switched to the viola.

The Amadeus Quartet asked him regularly to play second viola in the string quintet and the string sextet repertoire. In spring 1949 he joined the violas of the London Philharmonic Orchestra. In 1950 he co-founded the Melos Ensemble. Aronowitz was the violist of the group for decades, and Terence Weil was the cellist. Bassoonist William Waterhouse wrote in 1995, "It was the remarkable rapport between this pair of lower strings, which remained constant throughout a succession of distinguished leaders, that gave a special distinction to this outstanding ensemble." He played and recorded with the Pro Arte Piano Quartet, with Kenneth Sillito playing violin, and Terence Weil and Lamar Crowson playing piano. Aronowitz played regularly with the London Mozart Players and was the principal violist with the Goldsbrough Orchestra (later to become the English Chamber Orchestra). He also appeared at the Aldeburgh Festival every year from 1949 until his death in 1978. At Aldeburgh, Aronowitz was a soloist, chamber musician, and leader of the violas in the English Opera Group.

Benjamin Britten wrote many viola parts with Cecil Aronowitz in mind, particularly in his chamber operas and church operas. The chamber music in his War Requiem was written for the Melos Ensemble and was conducted by Britten in the first performance at Coventry in 1962. The first recording was made in 1963. Cecil Aronowitz also participated in the premiere and first recording of Britten's Curlew River in 1964. In 1976, Britten wrote Aronowitz a version of his Lachrymae (written for William Primrose in 1950, originally for viola and piano) for viola and string orchestra.

In 1951, he premiered the Suite for Viola and Cello by Arthur Butterworth with Terence Weil. Alun Hoddinott wrote a Viola Concertino for him in 1958. Variations for Viola and Piano (1958), the Op. 1 of Hugh Wood, was premiered by Margaret Kitchin and Cecil Aronowitz on 7 July 1959 at a concert in the Wigmore Hall given by the Society for the Promotion of New Music. In the 1960s, he played in the Cremona Quartet with leader Hugh Maguire, Iona Brown, and Terence Weil. At the 1976 Aldeburgh Festival he and his wife Nicola Grunberg gave the first public performance outside Russia of Shostakovich's last work, the Sonata for Viola and Piano, Op. 147, in the presence of Britten and Shostakovich's widow.

He taught viola and chamber music at the Royal College of Music for 25 years, then in 1973 became the first Head of Strings at the newly formed Royal Northern College of Music in Manchester. The RNCM has regularly awarded a Cecil Aronowitz Prize for viola.

In 1978 he suffered a stroke in a performance of Mozart's String Quintet in C major at Snape Maltings and died in Ipswich, England, on 7 September.

His name is remembered in the Musicians' Book of Remembrance in the Musician's Chapel within the Church of the Holy Sepulchre, (The Musicians' Church) in London.

== Recordings ==
His long discography includes many notable recordings with the Melos Ensemble. Their recordings of chamber music for both woodwinds and strings were reissued in 2011, including the works for larger ensembles which were the reason to found the ensemble, such as Beethoven's Septet and Octet, Schubert's Octet and Ravel's Introduction and Allegro, played with Osian Ellis (harp), Richard Adeney (flute), Gervase de Peyer (clarinet), Emanuel Hurwitz and Ivor McMahon (violin), and Terence Weil (cello).

- Mátyás Seiber: Elegy for viola and orchestra, London Philharmonic Orchestra, Mátyás Seiber (1960)
- Benjamin Britten: War Requiem (1963)
- Benjamin Britten: Curlew River (1965)
- Johannes Brahms: String Quintets, String Sextet No. 1, String Sextet No. 2, Amadeus Quartet, William Pleeth (1966–1968)
- Gustav Holst: Lyric Movement for Viola and Small Orchestra, English Chamber Orchestra, Imogen Holst (1967)
- W. A. Mozart: String Quintets, Amadeus Quartet (1967–1974)
- Hindemith: Trauermusik for viola and strings, English Chamber Orchestra, Daniel Barenboim (1968)
- Berlioz: Harold en Italie, with the York Symphony Orchestra
- Ralph Vaughan Williams: Flos Campi, with the Jacques Orchestra and the Choir of King's College, Cambridge, David Willcocks (1970)
- Richard Strauss: Prelude to Capriccio, Amadeus Quartet, William Pleeth (1971)
- Johannes Brahms: Two Songs for Voice, Viola and Piano, Op. 91, Janet Baker, André Previn (piano)
