= Gwenneth Pryor =

Australian pianist

- Born: April 7, 1941; Sydney, Australia
- Died: 2023
- Genres: Classical
- Occupation: pianist
- Instrument: Piano
- Spouse: Roger Stone

Gwenneth Pryor (1941 - 2023) was an Australian pianist based in England.

== Career ==
Gwenneth Pryor graduated from the Sydney Conservatorium of Music where she won a prize for most outstanding student in 1960. She won the Pedley Woolley McMenamin Travelling Scholarship to the Royal College of Music in London, where she was awarded the Hopkinson Gold Medal. She continued her stay in London after her scholarship was extended, and also performed in competitions in Moscow and Prague, and represented the Royal College of Music in Vienna.

In 1965 she made her London debut at Wigmore Hall, and soon after recorded Beethoven Sonatas with violinist Carlos Villa that became a best-selling classical record upon its release in 1967, and was made BBC Record of the Year. She had also recorded with Gervase de Peyer, London Symphony Orchestra, London Philharmonic Orchestra, the English Chamber Orchestra, and for ABC and BBC radio.

She had performed tours in England, Europe, Australia, and America, and was a member of the Melos Ensemble in 1974.

== Personal life ==
Pryor was born in Sydney, Australia. Her family moved to Canberra when she was five years old, and then Newcastle when she was 13, so she could attend the Newcastle Conservatorium, before studying at the Sydney Conservatorium.

She was based in London since the 1960s, where she lived with her husband Roger Stone and their daughter and son. Stone was Pryor's agent and manager until his death.
