= Ernst Ueckermann =

South African composer and pianist

Ernst Ueckermann (born Estcourt in 1954) is a South African composer and pianist.

His formal music studies were conducted at the Johannesburg Art School, Royal College and Royal Academy of Music in London, the Musikhochschulen of Würzburg and Freiburg, Germany, with Professors Kirsti Hjort, Bertold Hummel and Helmut Barth. He has participated in numerous master classes with members of the Melos Ensemble, Brahms Trio, Moscow piano trio and some of the world's foremost pianists.

His pianistic career gained momentum during his student years and culminated in a busy international career. Concerts and recordings have been done in many capitals all over the globe as soloist, with diverse chamber music ensembles and as accompanist. Compact disks, radio productions and Television concerts have also been produced for amongst other; the Bavarian Broadcasting Company, West German Radio and Television, Swiss Radio (Zuerich), Rádio Portugal, Azores Television, Korean Television, Adv Vienna and Television Cultura in Brazil.

Ernst Ueckermann's compositions include works for orchestra, chamber music, solo pieces and four song cycles, of which several have been commissioned. He received composition prizes in 1980 and 1982. Numerous compositions have been recorded by diverse broadcasting companies and have been performed at international festivals. His work - which includes three manuals on "Creative Harmony" - is published by the Braun-Peretti Verlag in Bonn.

He currently lectures composition techniques at the University of Cologne and heads a piano and chamber music class at the Musikhochschule Wuerzburg.

== Publications ==
Kammermusik for String-trio, Woodwinds, Vibraphon, Cembalo and Doublebass	1978 Wuerzburg; Production1978
Kaleb for two Pianos	1978 Wuerzburg; Production1978
Le dormeur du val for Voice, Marimba and Doublebass.	1986 Freiburg; Commission for the international Doublebass Festival. Production 1998
Le Mal for Voice, Marimba and Doublebass	1995 Wuerzburg; Production 1998
Xosha-Xosha for Violoncello and Piano	1994 Mannheim; CD Production 1997; Published 2000 Verlag Braun-Peretti
Endzeit for Violoncello and Piano	1994 Mannheim; CD Production 1997; Published 2000 Verlag Braun-Peretti
Prelude for Piano and Choir; Commissioned by the Frankfurter Gesellschaft fuer Literatur und Musik for the Heine centenary	1997 Wiesbaden CD Production 1997
Zwei Gesaenge	1982 Wuerzburg; Production 1982
Japanischer Liederzyklus	BR Production 1998
Japanese songcycle	BR Production 1998
Kreative Harmonielehre	Published 1999 Verlag Braun-Peretti
