= Terence Weil =

British classical cellist

- Born: 9 December 1921; London, UK
- Died: 25 February 1995 (aged 73); Figueras, Spain
- Education: Royal Academy of Music
- Occupation: Classical cellist
- Organizations: Melos Ensemble; English Chamber Orchestra; Royal Northern College of Music

Terence Weil (9 December 1921 in London – 25 February 1995 in Figueras) was a British cellist, principal cellist of the English Chamber Orchestra, a founding member of the Melos Ensemble, a leading chamber musician and an influential teacher at the Royal Northern College of Music.

== Career ==
Herbert Walenn was Weil's cello teacher at the Royal Academy of Music. After the war he joined a string quartet formed by the violinist Emanuel Hurwitz, a friend and colleague. He was also principal cello of chamber orchestras such as the Goldsbrough Orchestra (later known as the English Chamber Orchestra, or ECO), and was an outstanding continuo cellist.

Together with clarinettist Gervase de Peyer and violist Cecil Aronowitz, he helped found the Melos Ensemble in 1950. He was its principal cellist for decades, and Aronowitz its principal violist. Bassoonist William Waterhouse wrote in 1995: "It was the remarkable rapport between this pair of lower strings, which remained constant throughout a succession of distinguished leaders, that gave a special distinction to this outstanding ensemble."

His close association with Benjamin Britten began in 1946, when he played in the premiere of his opera The Rape of Lucretia in the first postwar season of the Glyndebourne Festival. He took part in each of the early Aldeburgh Festivals, including in the premieres of Britten's operas Albert Herring and Noye's Fludde. The composer conducted the Melos Ensemble in the first performance of his War Requiem in Coventry in 1962, and also in the first recording of it in 1963.

Weil premiered the Suite for viola and cello by Arthur Butterworth with Cecil Aronowitz in 1951.

In the 1960s, he was cellist of the Cremona Quartet under leader Hugh Maguire, with Iona Brown as second violinist and Aronowitz as violist. In the Pro Arte Piano Quartet he played with Kenneth Sillito (violin), Aronowitz and Lamar Crowson (piano).

In 1974, he became the first Professor of Chamber Music at the newly opened Royal Northern College of Music in Manchester. Among the student groups he coached was the Brodsky Quartet. The institute regularly awards a Terence Weil prize to the best chamber music ensemble.

He retired to Cadaqués, Spain in 1985, where he died ten years later, aged 74.

== Recordings ==
His long discography includes many notable recordings with the Melos Ensemble, including the Trout Quintet and octets of Schubert, the Clarinet Quintet of Mozart and the Clarinet Quintet of Brahms. Their recordings of chamber music for both woodwinds and strings were reissued in 2011, including the works for larger ensembles which were the reason to found the ensemble, such as Beethoven's Septet and Octet, Schubert's Octet and Ravel's Introduction and Allegro, played with Osian Ellis (harp), Richard Adeney (flute), Gervase de Pexer (clarinet), Emanuel Hurwitz and Ivor McMahon (violin) and Cecil Aronowitz (viola). He also recorded trios and quartets by Schumann and Fauré with the Pro Arte Piano Quartet and string quartets with the Cremona Quartet. He was the cellist in a recording of Dido and Aeneas by Henry Purcell with the English Chamber Orchestra and Janet Baker. A 1964 performance of Mozart's Piano Quartet K.478 was filmed in London, with Benjamin Britten (piano), Emanuel Hurwitz and Cecil Aronowitz. Many reviews of his recordings are available in the Gramophone Archive.

== Instruments ==
Terence Weil played an Amati and later a cello built by Matteo Goffriller that had belonged to Pablo Casals before.
