= Quintet for clarinet and strings (Gordon) =

Quintet for Clarinet and Strings is a chamber work in four movements, for B♭ clarinet and string quartet, by American composer Geoffrey Gordon (1968).

Commissioned by The American Music Project, for the JACK Quartet and New York Philharmonic principal clarinet, Anthony McGill, Geoffrey Gordon's Quintet for Clarinet and Strings was premiered at Roulette in New York City, 20 November 2015, and at Ganz Memorial Hall in Chicago on 6 March 2016. This was the second commission from the American Music Project, and at more than 30 minutes in length, in four movements, represents a significant addition to the contemporary clarinet quintet repertoire.

The New York Times, in a review of the premiere, called the work "darkly seductive" and "a colorful and atmospheric journey". Music critic Corinna da Fonseca-Wollheim provided the following analysis: "Across four movements, the interaction between clarinet and strings changes, with moments of bright commonality and others in which the warm, musky clarinet tone contrasts with the sharper and glossier one of the string quartet. In the third movement, small cells of players break away for a series of arresting duos and a trio that chart different interpersonal dynamics. The work ends softly on a languid low clarinet trill, which Mr. McGill played so quietly that the final notes were not so much heard as felt as gently pulsating airwaves."

Simon Reitmaier and the string quartet of Academy St. Blasius presented the European premiere in October 2026 in Innsbruck.
