= Emanuel Hurwitz =

British violinist

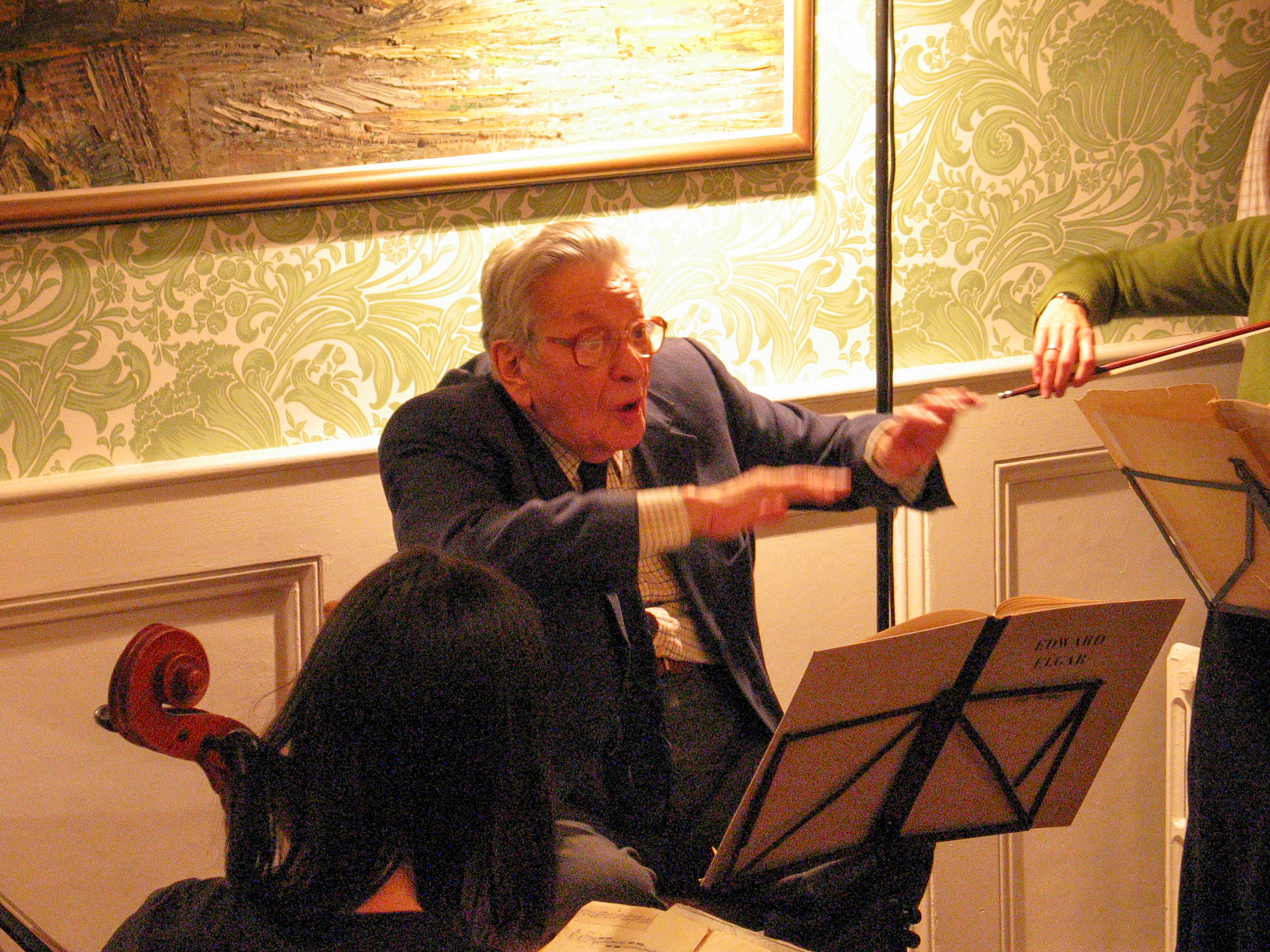
Emanuel Hurwitz conducts an impromptu string ensemble, London, March 2006

Emanuel Hurwitz CBE (7 May 1919 – 19 November 2006) was a British violinist. He was born in London to parents of Russian-Jewish ancestry.

He started playing the violin when he was five years old, and took up a scholarship at the Royal Academy of Music at the age of 14; he was much later a professor there. During the Second World War he joined the Royal Army Medical Corps playing the violin in Stars in Battledress.

In 1946, he founded the Hurwitz String Quartet. In 1948 he became leader of the English Chamber Orchestra when it was founded – at that time known as the Goldsbrough Orchestra. He was principal violinist of the Melos Ensemble 1956-1972. Their recordings of chamber music for both woodwinds and strings were reissued in 2011, including the works for larger ensembles which were the reason to found the ensemble, such as Beethoven's Septet and Octet, Schubert's Octet and Ravel's Introduction and Allegro, played with Osian Ellis (harp), Richard Adeney (flute), Gervase de Peyer (clarinet), Ivor McMahon (violin), Cecil Aronowitz (viola) and Terence Weil (cello). From 1959 he led the renamed English Chamber Orchestra – previously the Goldsbrough Orchestra. From 1969 to 1971 he led the New Philharmonia Orchestra. In 1970 he became leader of the Aeolian Quartet.

He was appointed a Commander of the Order of the British Empire (CBE) in 1978.

For most of his career he played an Antonio and Girolamo Amati from 1603.
