= Ferdinand Troyer =

Count Ferdinand Troyer (1 February 1780 – 23 July 1851) was an Austrian noble, philanthropist, amateur clarinettist, and composer.

Born in Brünn (Brno), Moravia, Troyer became the chief steward to Archduke Rudolf of Austria-Tuscany. It was noted that on 2 March 1817, Troyer played the obbligato to Wolfgang Amadeus Mozart's Parto for the Vienna Philharmonic Society at the Large Ridotto Room. His sound was described as being "sensitive," with an "extremely tender handling" of the clarinet.

Because of the popularity of Ludwig van Beethoven's E-flat Septet, in early 1824, Troyer commissioned Franz Schubert to write a companion piece. Schubert accepted the commission but enriched the seven-part instrumentation of Beethoven's septet with an additional violin to create an octet. The Octet in F major was completed on 1 March 1824 and was first performed at Troyer's townhouse in Vienna, where Troyer himself played the clarinet part. He died in Vienna.
