= Clarinet quintet =

Chamber music ensemble

Traditionally a clarinet quintet is a chamber musical ensemble made up of one clarinet, plus the standard string quartet of two violins, one viola, and one cello. Now the term clarinet quintet can refer to any combination of instruments in the clarinet family (mainly B♭, E♭, bass, and E♭ alto clarinets). The term is also used to refer to a piece written for one of these ensembles.

== History ==
One of the earliest and most influential works for the traditional combination of clarinet and string quartet is Mozart's Quintet for Clarinet and Strings, K. 581, written for the clarinetist Anton Stadler in 1789. Although a few compositions for this ensemble were produced over the following years, including the Clarinet Quintet in B♭ major, Op. 34 by Carl Maria von Weber, a composer famous for his solo clarinet compositions, it was not until Johannes Brahms composed his Clarinet Quintet in B minor, Op. 115 for Richard Mühlfeld that the clarinet quintet began to receive considerable attention from composers.

== Works for clarinet quintet ==
- Wolfgang Amadeus Mozart – Clarinet Quintet in A major, K. 581 (1789)
- Johann Georg Heinrich Backofen – Clarinet Quintet in B♭ major, Op. 15.
- Sigismund Neukomm – Clarinet Quintet in B♭ major, Op. 8.
- Carl Maria von Weber – Clarinet Quintet in B♭ major, Op. 34 (1811–1815)
- Giacomo Meyerbeer – Clarinet Quintet in E♭ major (1813)
- Franz Krommer – Clarinet Quintet in B♭ major, Op. 95 (1820)
- Anton Reicha – Clarinet Quintet in B♭ major, Op. 89 (1820) and Quintet in F major for clarinet or oboe and string quartet, Op. 107 (1829)
- Heinrich Baermann – three clarinet quintets
- Thomas Täglichsbeck – Clarinet Quintet in B♭ major, Op. 44 (1863)
- Ferruccio Busoni – Suite in G minor, BV 176 (1880)
- Alexander Glazunov – Rêverie orientale, Op. 14 (1886)
- Johannes Brahms – Clarinet Quintet in B minor, Op. 115 (1891)
- Johan Adam Krygell – Clarinet Quintet in E♭ major, Op. 81 "Serenade" (ca. 1894–95)
- Samuel Coleridge-Taylor – Clarinet Quintet in F♯ minor, Op. 10 (1895)
- Henri Marteau – Clarinet Quintet in C minor, Op. 13 (1908)
- Joseph Holbrooke – Cavatina and Variations, Clarinet Quintet No. 1 in D minor, Op. 15b (1910) and Clarinet Quintet No. 2 Ligeia in G major, Op. 27 (1910, revised 1939 and c.1956; original title Fate)
- Robert Fuchs – Clarinet Quintet in E♭ major, Op. 102 (1914)
- Alexander Krein – Three Sketches on Hebrew Themes for Clarinet Quintet, Op. 12 (1914) and Two Sketches on Hebrew Themes for Clarinet Quintet, Op. 13 (1914)
- Max Reger – Clarinet Quintet in A major, Op. 146 (1915–1916)
- Herbert Howells – Rhapsodic Quintet, Op. 31 (1917)
- Arthur Somervell – Clarinet Quintet in G major (1919)
- Paul Hindemith – Clarinet Quintet, Op. 30 (1923, revised 1954)
- Günter Raphael – Clarinet Quintet in F major, Op. 4 (1924)
- Quincy Porter – Clarinet Quintet (1929)
- Arthur Bliss – Clarinet Quintet, F. 20 (1932)
- Gordon Jacob – Clarinet Quintet in G minor (1939)
- Boris Papandopulo – Clarinet Quintet (1960)
- Paul Ben-Haim – Clarinet Quintet, Op. Op. 31a (1941, revised 1965)
- Morton Feldman – Two Pieces for Clarinet & String Quartet (1961); Clarinet & String Quartet (1983)
- Kurt George Roger – Clarinet Quintet, Op. 116 (1966)
- Bernard Herrmann – Souvenirs de voyage (1967)
- Jean Françaix – Clarinet Quintet (1977)
- Isang Yun – Clarinet Quintet No. 1 (1984) and Clarinet Quintet No. 2 (1994)
- Edison Denisov – Clarinet Quintet (1987)
- Dan Welcher – Quintet for Clarinet and String Quartet
- Ellen Taaffe Zwilich – Quintet for Clarinet and String Quartet (1990)
- Sean Osborn – Clarinet Quintet (1995) and Quintet for Clarinet and Strings, "The Beatles" (2004)
- Milton Babbitt – Clarinet Quintet (1996)
- Jennifer Higdon – Soliloquy
- Howard J. Buss – Millennium Visions (1999)
- Wolfgang Rihm – Vier Studien zu einem Klarinettenquintett (2002)
- Elliott Carter – Clarinet Quintet (2007)
- Ned Rothenberg – Quintet for clarinet and strings (2007)
- Hugh Wood – Clarinet Quintet, Op. 53 (2007)
- David Bruce – Gumboots (2008)
- Jesús Torres – Clarinet Quintet (2009)
- Airat Ichmouratov One Day of an Almost Ordinary Life, for klezmer clarinet and string quartet, Op. 47 / clarinet and string orchestra Op. 47A (2015)
- Emily Howard Zugzwänger (2012)
- Geoffrey Gordon – Quintet for Clarinet and Strings (2015)
- Beat Furrer – intorno al bianco for clarinet and string quartet (2016)
- Jörg Widmann – Clarinet Quintet (2017)
- Theodore Antoniou – Clarinet Quintet (unknown)
- Philippos Tsalachouris – Clarinet Quintet (unknown)
- Philipp Ortmeier – Clarinet Quintet On a Thin Line (2018)
- Robin Holloway – Clarinet Quintet, op.136 (2020)
- Angelique Poteat – Six Seasons (2022)
- Peter Seabourne – Clarinet Quintet (2023)
- William C. White – Clarinet Quintet, op. 55 (2023)

Composers such as Franz Krommer and Joseph Küffner wrote for clarinet quintets which include two violas rather than two violins.

== See also ==
- Clarinet
- String Quartet
