= Adrian Beers =

British double bass player

Adrian Beers MBE
- Born: 6 January 1916; Glasgow, UK
- Died: 8 April 2004 (aged 88); London, UK
- Education: Royal College of Music
- Occupation: Classical double bassist
- Organizations: Philharmonia Orchestra; English Chamber Orchestra; Melos Ensemble; Royal College of Music; Royal Northern College of Music

Adrian Simon Beers MBE (6 January 1916 – 8 April 2004) was a British double bass player and teacher at the Royal College of Music and the Royal Northern College of Music. He was a principal player in the Philharmonia Orchestra and the English Chamber Orchestra, and a chamber musician, notably in the Melos Ensemble that he helped found.

== Career ==
Beers was born in Glasgow on 6 January 1916, the son of double bass player Aloysius "Wishy" Beers. He attended Bellahouston Academy and studied the cello, piano and double bass with his father. Deputising for him as a player in music halls, then the dominant form of popular entertainment in Britain, he gained early experience and repertoire. He won a Caird Scholarship to study at the Royal College of Music in London with Claude Hobday, where he also studied composition with Herbert Howells. He made a living by playing in the Gaiety Theatre and later the London Casino.

After the war he was a member of the newly formed Philharmonia Orchestra until 1963, occasionally returning until 2002. He also played in the Goldsbrough Orchestra, which later became the English Chamber Orchestra (ECO). "His secure intonation, precise sense of timing and sonorous tone earned him the respect of everyone, particularly Benjamin Britten, Daniel Barenboim and Raymond Leppard during many years with the ECO, and also Georg Solti, Zubin Mehta, Otto Klemperer and others who conducted the Philharmonia."

In 1950 Adrian Beers was a founding member of the Melos Ensemble that "set new standards of music-making". Their cellist Terence Weil became a close friend. Beers recalled: "Looking back at old diaries, I don't know how I did it. Three sessions a day – sometimes travelling up north and coming home at night – then on again at 9:30, rehearsing sometimes at midnight with the Melos."

His close working partnership with Benjamin Britten led to performances at the Aldeburgh Festival as the opening night in 1969, including Schubert's Trout Quintet with the Amadeus Quartet and Britten at the piano. That night the Snape Maltings concert hall was destroyed by fire, also destroying Beers' Grancino double bass and Britten's piano. Britten helped with the purchase of a replacement, again a Grancino.

Beers became a teacher at the Royal College of Music and in 1973 at the newly formed Royal Northern College of Music in Manchester. His student Rodney Slatford described his teaching, concluding: "One gleaned most from Beers from sharing an orchestral desk with him."

Beers was appointed Member of the Order of the British Empire in the 1990 New Year Honours, "for services to music". He continued playing and teaching into his eighties. He died on 8 April 2004 in London.

== Recordings ==
His long discography includes many notable recordings with the Melos Ensemble. With the ECO he recorded among others Monteverdi's Madrigals and Purcell's Dido and Aeneas (with Jessye Norman), both conducted by Raymond Leppard, Vivaldi's Laudate Pueri, conducted by Vittorio Negri, Handel's Saul, conducted by Charles Mackerras, Bach's Brandenburg concertos, conducted by Johannes Somary, and music conducted by Benjamin Britten: Bach's St John Passion, Mozart's Symphonies. and his opera Idomeneo
