= Adrian Adlam =

British violinist, conductor and music educator

Adrian Adlam (born 24 December 1963) is a British violinist, conductor and music educator. He was educated at Westminster Abbey, Winchester College, Conservatoire Royale de Musique of Brussels and the Hochschule fur Musik, Hanover.

Adlam has performed as a soloist and chamber musician throughout Europe, the US and Japan. He has appeared as concertmaster with several European orchestras, including the London Symphony Orchestra, the Deutsche Kammerphilharmonie and the BBC Scottish Symphony Orchestra in which he has collaborated with such distinguished musicians as Bernstein, Boulez, Mehta, Solti, Ozawa, Haitink, Davis and Tilson Thomas.

Adlam is known as a soloist for his performances of the concerti by Tchaikovsky, Paganini, Mendelssohn, Bruch, Wieniawski, Bach, Mozart and Vivaldi. Adlam's CD recordings of works for violin by Carl Nielsen received a Pizzicato Supersonic award in 2007. Adlam's recording of the Schubert Octet was voted surround sound audio DVD of the year 2004 by the Verband Deutscher Tonmeister , and his performance there has been characterized as showing "almost superhuman strength and virtuosity".

As co-founder and artistic director of the International Freden Music Festival (Internationale Fredener Musiktage) in Germany, Adlam is responsible for the programming and commissioning of new works by some of the leading contemporary composers. On 6 August 2005, he played in the world premiere of Christian Jost's eingefroren (Trio for violin, clarinet, and piano) at the Freden Festival. The festival was awarded the Praetorius Musikpreis Niedersachsen from the state of Niedersachsen in 2010.

As a member of the Hans Koller Octet, Adlam appeared in the 2007 Cheltenham Jazz Festival. He also directs the Winchester Music Festival Orchestra and has been teaching at Winchester College.

== Recordings ==
- English Orchestral Songs – BBC Scottish Symphony Orchestra (orchestra), Martyn Brabbins (conductor), Christopher Maltman (baritone), Adrian Adlam (leader). Label: Hyperion Records.
- Carl Nielsen Violin Sonatas – Adrian Adlam (violin), Christopher Oakden (piano). Label: Eigenart.
- Schubert: Octet, D. 803 – Camerata Freden: Adrian Adlam (violin), Cristiano Gualco (violin), Michael Hesselink (clarinet), Marjolein Dispa (viola), Michel Dispa (cello), Ilka Emmert (double-bass), Letizia Viola (bassoon), Ron Schaaoer (French horn). Label: Tacet.
