= Clarinet Quintet (Täglichsbeck) =

Music piece by Thomas Täglichsbeck

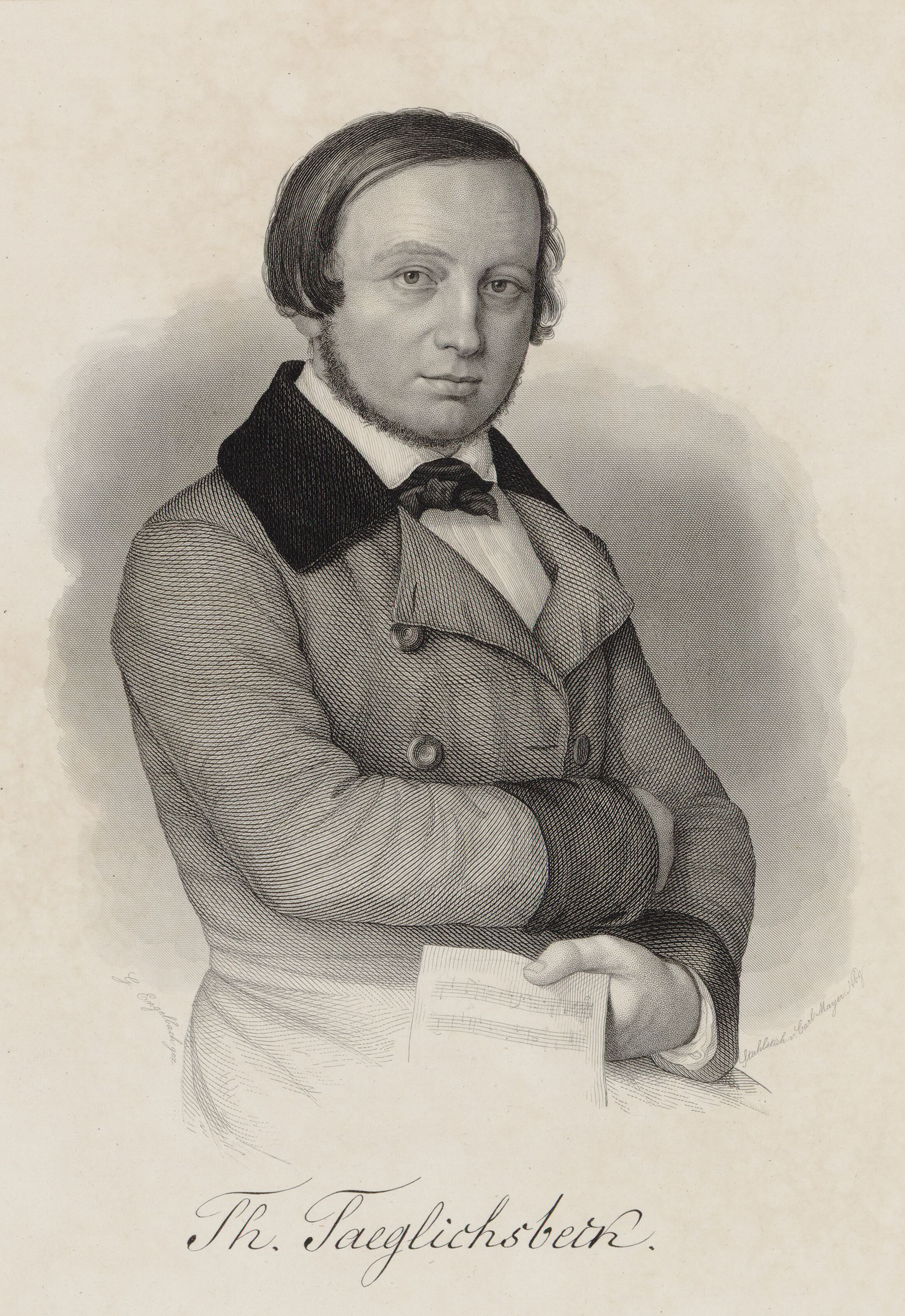
Thomas Täglichsbeck

The Quintet for Clarinet and Strings in B♭ major, Op. 44, is a clarinet quintet by Thomas Täglichsbeck. It is scored for clarinet in B♭ and string quartet. It was published in 1863.

== Structure ==
The work is structured in four movements:

1. Allegro con fuoco (Note: As given in parts, in a surviving manuscript version, the tempo is given as Allegro)
2. Scherzo: Allegro
3. Adagio
4. Rondo: Allegretto vivace
