= Osian Ellis =

Welsh harpist, composer, and teacher (1928–2021)

Osian Ellis CBE
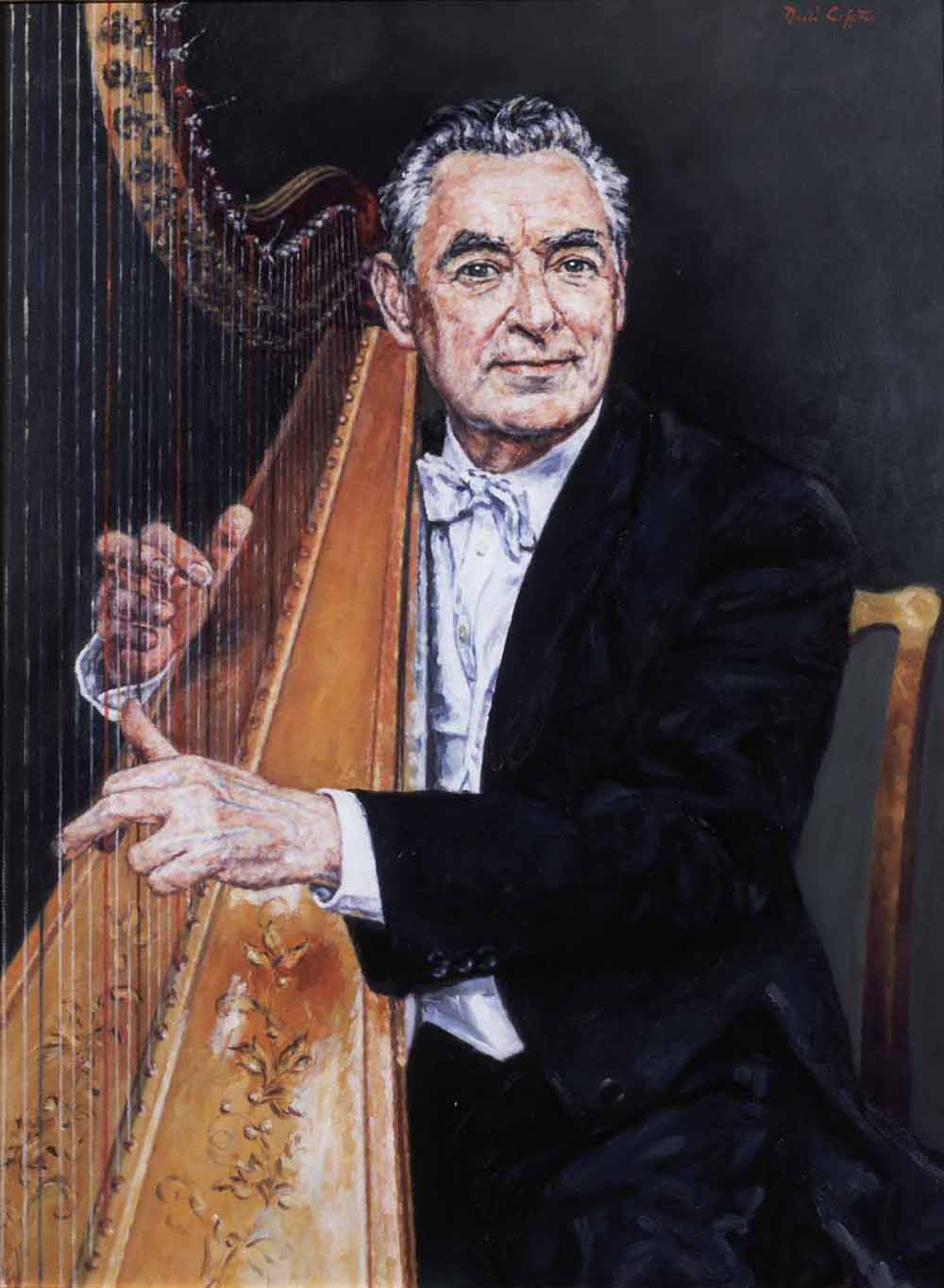
- Portrait of Ellis by David Griffiths (1998)
- Born: Osian Gwynn Ellis; 8 February 1928; Ffynnongroew, Flintshire, Wales
- Died: 5 January 2021 (aged 92); Pwllheli, Gwynedd, Wales
- Education: Royal Academy of Music
- Occupations: Harpist; Composer; Academic teacher
- Organizations: Royal Academy of Music; London Symphony Orchestra; Melos Ensemble; Wales International Harp Festival

Osian Gwynn Ellis CBE (8 February 1928 – 5 January 2021) was a Welsh harpist, composer and teacher. He was principal harpist of the London Symphony Orchestra, a founding member of the Melos Ensemble and a professor of harp at the Royal Academy of Music. Many composers wrote music for him. From 1959 onwards, Ellis had a close professional partnership with Benjamin Britten that lasted to the latter's death. He was often first to perform and record Britten's works.

== Career ==
Osian Gwynn Ellis was born in Ffynnongroew, Flintshire, in 1928, the son of the Rev. Tomos Ellis, a Welsh Methodist minister, and his wife Jenny (née Lewis), a harpist, and spent the first four years of his life at Llys Myfr on Llinegr Hill. As a boy Ellis was obsessed with playing the harp and playing football. In 2018 he recalled: "I chose the harp because we had one at home. My mother, Jennie, was a good amateur harpist. We did spend some years living in Denbigh and I was the goalkeeper for Denbigh County School. I taught myself to play the harp to some degree and was encouraged by my mother."

He studied at the Royal Academy of Music with Gwendolen Mason, whom he later succeeded as professor of harp from 1959 to 1989. He joined the London Symphony Orchestra in 1961 and became principal harpist. He recalled: "I did two Royal Variety Performances in the pit at the London Palladium involving Bob Hope and many other top stars. I also joined the Wally Stott Orchestra and we played on the original Goon Shows starring Spike Milligan, Harry Secombe and Peter Sellers and, for a short time, Michael Bentine." He was a founding member of the Melos Ensemble and also formed the Osian Ellis Harp Ensemble.

Ellis's 1959 recording of Handel's harp concertos (with Thurston Dart) won the Grand Prix du Disque. In 1962, the Melos Ensemble with Ellis released what is considered by musicologist Paul Loeber the finest rendition ever of Ravel's Introduction and Allegro, playing with flautist Richard Adeney, clarinettist Gervase de Peyer, violinists Emanuel Hurwitz and Ivor McMahon, violist Cecil Aronowitz and cellist Terence Weil. The record, released on the L'Oiseau-Lyre label, OL 50217, included works by three other French composers — Debussy: Sonata for Flute, Viola and Harp; Albert Roussel: Serenade for Flute, Violin, Viola, Cello and Harp; and Guy Ropartz: Prelude, Marine and Chansons for Flute, Violin, Viola, Cello and Harp. He also took part in the ensemble's recording of Peter Maxwell Davies's cantata Leopardi Fragments.

== Honours and awards ==
Ellis was made Commander of the Order of the British Empire in 1971.

He was the honorary president of the Wales International Harp Festival and in 2018 was honoured at the festival, in Caernarfon, when a new work was premiered to celebrate his 90th birthday.

A portrait of Ellis with Peter Pears by photographer Nigel Luckhurst is held in the collection of the National Portrait Gallery, London.

== Influence on other musicians ==
Concertos were written for him by Alun Hoddinott (for the Cheltenham Festival in 1957), William Mathias (for the Llandaff Festival of 1970), Jørgen Jersild (1972), William Alwyn (1979) and Robin Holloway (1985).

Ellis is particularly known for his musical association with Benjamin Britten, with whom he collaborated extensively. Their relationship began when Ellis was the harpist in a performance of A Ceremony of Carols in London on 4 January 1959, conducted by George Malcolm, which resulted in an invitation to play at the Aldeburgh Festival the following year. Britten wrote the harp part in several of his major pieces with Ellis in mind, particularly A Midsummer Night's Dream, the War Requiem and the church parables. Britten also wrote his Harp Suite, Op. 83, for Ellis in 1969. Ellis appeared in many first recordings of Britten's pieces, often with Britten himself conducting. When Britten had to withdraw, due to heart surgery, from accompanying his partner, the tenor Peter Pears, on the piano, Ellis came to accompany Pears, and Britten wrote new pieces for them, including Canticle V: The Death of St Narcissus (1974) and A Birthday Hansel (1975).

== Compositions and writings ==
Ellis's own compositions drew on his Welsh heritage, including settings of Welsh folksongs for tenor and harp and settings of medieval Welsh strict metre poems. Diversions for two harps includes a cerdd dant setting of Dylan Thomas' poem "And death shall have no dominion".

His writings include The Story of the Harp in Wales (1991) ISBN 0-7083-1104-0 (a revision of an earlier publication in Welsh), which traces the harp's development and discusses some famous harpists.

== Discography ==
- Franck: Sonata for Violin and Piano; Debussy: Sonatas; Ravel: Introduction and Allegro, 1988, London/Decca
- Masterworks for the Harp, 1993, Boston Skyline
- Diversions, 1994, Sain
- Mathias: Clarinet Concerto; Harp Concerto; Piano Concerto, 1995, Lyrita
- Harp Concertos, 1997, London
- 17th & 18th-Century Harp Music, 2008, L'Oiseau-Lyre
- 19th & 20th-Century Harp Music, 2008, L'Oiseau-Lyre
- Debussy & Ravel: String Quartets; Cello Sonata; Introduction & Allegro, 2016, Alto
- Songs with Harp, Eloquence
- Handel: Jephtha; Rodrigo; Concertos for Lute & Harp; Concerto Grosso, HWV 318, Decca/Eloquence
