= Hugh Maguire (violinist) =

Irish violinist, leader and concertmaster (1926–2013)

- Born: Andrew Hugh Michael Maguire; 2 August 1926; Dublin, Ireland
- Died: 14 June 2013 (aged 86); Peasenhall, Suffolk, England
- Education: Royal Academy of Music
- Occupations: Violinist; Academic teacher
- Organizations: London Symphony Orchestra; BBC Symphony Orchestra; Melos Ensemble; Allegri Quartet; Royal Academy of Music; National Youth Orchestra of Great Britain

Andrew Hugh Michael Maguire (2 August 1926 – 14 June 2013) was an Irish violinist, leader, concertmaster and principal player of the London Symphony Orchestra and the BBC Symphony Orchestra (1962–1967), leader of the Melos Ensemble and the Allegri Quartet, a professor at the Royal Academy of Music, and violin tutor to the National Youth Orchestra of Great Britain.

== Career ==
Maguire was born on 2 August 1926, in Dublin, as one of six siblings, all of whom became professional musicians. His father Elias, a headmaster and tenor, introduced him to violin lessons at age 6. By age 12, he had won every prize for violin-playing at the principal music festivals in Ireland. Educated at the Belvedere College, in 1944 he gained a four-year scholarship to the Royal Academy of Music in London, where he won the Alfred Waley and Alfred Gibson Prizes for violin playing, and the Cooper Prize and McEwan Prize for quartet playing. There he led the first orchestra for two years under Clarence Raybould and played concertos at several 'end of term' concerts.

In January 1949, Maguire was in the first violin section of the London Philharmonic Orchestra. In 1950, he spent ten months in Paris having lessons from George Enescu (to whom he acknowledged his greatest debt), and appeared as soloist, including a concerto under Roger Désormière. In 1952, he was appointed leader of the Bournemouth Symphony Orchestra, after which he had a short period as sub-leader of the BBC Symphony Orchestra.

In 1956, Maguire became leader of the London Symphony Orchestra until 1961, as one of the 'Young Turks' who helped to reshape the orchestra after a confrontation between management and players which had prompted many resignations. In 1959, he became a Fellow of the Royal Academy of Music. In 1962, he left the LSO to become leader of the BBC Symphony Orchestra, and held the post until 1967. From 1983 to 1991, he was leader of the Orchestra of the Royal Opera House, Covent Garden.

Maguire helped to found the Academy of St Martin in the Fields with Neville Marriner in 1959, and became closely associated with its work at the solo violin desk. His pre-eminence as a teacher and pedagogue for soloists and chamber music ensemble groups was also then developing. During the 1960s, he, Jacqueline du Pré and Fou Ts'ong performed as a piano trio. Maguire led the Cremona Quartet with Iona Brown, Cecil Aronowitz and Terence Weil, From 1974, he led the Melos Ensemble, heading that group's renewal after it had been temporarily disbanded following the death of Ivor McMahon. In 1978, Peter Pears invited Maguire to join the Britten-Pears School for Advanced Musical Studies as director of string studies. He served in the post until 2002.

Maguire became leader of the Allegri Quartet in 1968 with David Roth, Patrick Ireland and Bruno Schrecker. The quartet's recordings included the String Quartet No. 2 of Alexander Goehr and the Quartets Nos 3 & 4 of Frank Bridge. Sir Malcolm Arnold dedicated his string quartet no. 2 (1975) to him, first performed by the Allegri Quartet in Dublin Castle in June 1976, with the British premiere three days later at Snape Maltings, as part of the Aldeburgh Festival. He left the Allegri Quartet in 1976.

Maguire was a professor at the Royal Academy of Music in London for 26 years, and was also artistic director of the Irish Youth Orchestra, as well as violin tutor to the National Youth Orchestra of Great Britain. He was head of strings at the Britten-Pears school of music, taught master classes at Aldeburgh Music and was on the coaching staff of the ensemble training at the Leiston Abbey music school.

== Personal life and death ==
Maguire was married twice. He married Suzanne Lewis, a dancer, in 1943 with home he had five children. The couple divorced in 1987. His second marriage was to Tricia Catchpole, from 1988 until her death in 2013.

Maguire died at Peasenhall on 14 June 2013, aged 86.
