= Clarinet Quintet (Widmann) =

Musical composition by Jörg Widmann

- Clarinet quintet by Jörg Widmann
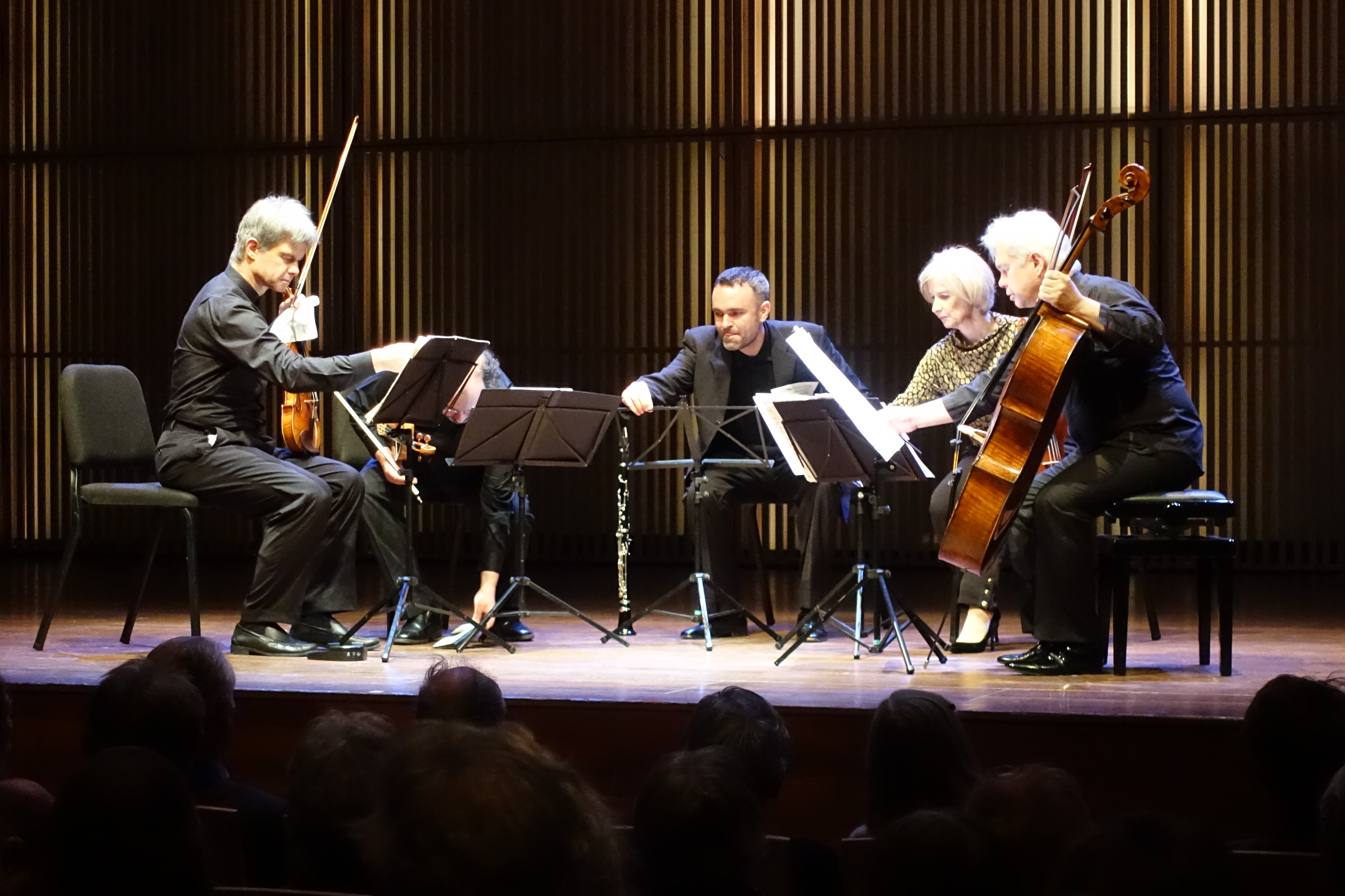
- Hagen Quartet in Muziekgebouw aan 't IJ with clarinetist Jörg Widmann on 27 January 2018
- Period: Contemporary
- Composed: 2017
- Published: 2019: Mainz
- Publisher: Schott Music
- Duration: 40:00
- Scoring: clarinet; 2 violins; viola; cello

Premiere
- Date: 24 April 2017
- Location: Auditorio Nacional de Música, Madrid
- Performers: Jörg Widmann, Hagen Quartet

Jörg Widmann's Clarinet Quintet was composed in 2017. It was premiered on 24 April 2017 in Madrid. The one-movement Adagio in tempo Lento assai has a duration of approximately forty minutes.

== Background ==
Initially the Hagen Quartet asked Widmann to compose a clarinet quintet. Widmann's unsuccessful first attempt to write a clarinet quintet was in 2009 and initially abandoned because "music history ... suddenly appeared as a great burden". The Clarinet Quintet was finally composed in 2017. The work is commissioned by Centro Nacional de Difusión Musical Madrid, Muziekgebouw Amsterdam, Strijkkwartet Biennale Amsterdam, LuganoMusica, Carnegie Hall, Cité de la Musique Paris, Stiftung Mozarteum Salzburg, Philharmonie Essen, and Wigmore Hall.

== Music ==
The material of the clarinet quintet is reduced to a minimum. A sighing motif of a falling fifth, a direct citation from the final of Brahms's Clarinet Quintet opens the clarinet part. The fifth is a melodic and harmonic (as drone) leitmotif of the whole composition. Another stamping element is a simple three note figure, consisting of one step up and two steps down. It is derived from Mozart's Clarinet Quintet first-movement theme. Special extended techniques are multiphonics, string harmonics, extended bowing techniques, "Toppan"-Staccato and echo effects. The music is often quiet.

Citation: Brahms, Clarinet Quintet, final, falling fifth

from

Citation: Mozart, Clarinet Quintet, first movement, main theme

== Performances ==
The world premiere was on 24 April 2017 in Madrid, Auditorio Nacional de Música, Sala de Cámara. Performers were Widmann and the Hagen Quartet. In 2018–2019 the Clarinet Quintet was played also in an international tour, with performances in Paris, Switzerland, Amsterdam, Essen, London, Salzburg, and New York.

== Reception ==
Heidemarie Klabacher wrote: "wonderful contribution to the music genre" ("wunderbarer Beitrag zur Gattung"). Gavin Dixon wrote: "a study in reserve and intimacy". Pablo L. Rodriguez wrote in El País: "Widmann shows his most intimate and melancholic side" ("Widmann muestra su lado más íntimo y melancólico").

== Discography ==
- Widmann, Jörg; Mozart, Wolfgang Amadeus; Hagen-Quartett (2022), Clarinet quintets (in no linguistic content), Myrios Classics, OCLC 1396769623
