= Gervase de Peyer =

- Born: 11 April 1926; London, England
- Origin: London, England
- Died: 4 February 2017 (aged 90)
- Genres: Classical
- Occupations: Soloist, conductor
- Instrument: Clarinet
- Years active: 1950–2017

Gervase Alan de Peyer (11 April 1926 – 4 February 2017) was an English clarinettist and conductor.

== Professional career ==
Gervase Alan de Peyer was born in London, the eldest of three children of Everard Esmé Vivian de Peyer, and his wife, Edith Mary (née Bartlett). He attended Bedales School, and was awarded a scholarship to the Royal College of Music, where he studied clarinet with Frederick Thurston and piano with Arthur Alexander. Towards the end of World War II, when he was aged 18, he joined the Royal Marines Band Service. He returned to the Royal College of Music after the war and subsequently studied in Paris with Louis Cahuzac.

In 1950 he was a founding member of the Melos Ensemble for which he continued to play until 1974. Their recordings of chamber music for both woodwinds and strings were reissued in 2011, including the works for larger ensembles which were the reason to found the ensemble, such as Beethoven's Septet and Octet, Schubert's Octet and Ravel's Introduction and Allegro, played with Osian Ellis (harp), Richard Adeney (flute), Emanuel Hurwitz and Ivor McMahon (violin), Cecil Aronowitz (viola) and Terence Weil (cello).

From 1956–73 he was principal clarinet of the London Symphony Orchestra. He was a founding member of The Chamber Music Society of Lincoln Center in New York in 1969 and played with them for 20 years.

He conducted the English Chamber Orchestra, the London Symphony Orchestra and the Melos Sinfonia; he directed the London Symphony Orchestra Wind Ensemble and was the associate conductor of the Haydn Orchestra. In 1959 he began teaching at the Royal Academy of Music.

De Peyer played first performances of concertos by Arnold Cooke, Sebastian Forbes, Alun Hoddinott, Joseph Horovitz, Thea Musgrave, Elizabeth Maconchy, William Mathias and Edwin Roxburgh. He premiered the Fantasy on an American Hymn Tune Op.70 for clarinet, cello and piano by Kenneth Leighton, commissioned by de Peyer, William Pleeth and Raphael Wallfisch and played by them at the Cheltenham Music Festival in 1975, and Miklós Rózsa's Sonata for Clarinet Solo op. 41 in New York in 1987.

== Selective discography ==
- Judith Blegen & Frederica von Stade: Songs, Arias & Duets, with the Chamber Music Society of Lincoln Center, Columbia, 1975
- Olivier Messiaën: Quatuor pour la fin du temps/Quartet for the End of Time. Abîme des oiseaux/Abyss of birds for solo clarinet. 1969
- Louis Spohr's Clarinet Concerto No 1 in C minor, Op. 26 with the London Symphony Orchestra conducted by Colin Davis. 1961, Editions de L'Oiseau-Lyre SOL 60035.
- Carl Maria von Weber's Clarinet Concerto No 2 in E Flat, Op. 74 with the London Symphony Orchestra conducted by Colin Davis. 1961, Editions de L'Oiseau-Lyre SOL 60035.
