= Geoffrey Gordon (composer) =

American composer (born 1968)

Geoffrey Gordon (born 28 August 1968) is an American composer of classical music.

== Biography ==
Gordon's list of works includes orchestral and chamber music—vocal and instrumental—as well as scores for theater, dance and film. His music has been called "darkly seductive" (The New York Times) and "fascinating" (Milwaukee Journal). He has been nominated for the Chamber Music Society of Lincoln Center's Elise Stoeger Prize, and is the recipient of the 2017 Mario Merz Prize in Music Composition.

He currently divides time between the United States and the United Kingdom.
