= Richard Adeney =

British flautist (1920–2010)

- Born: Richard Gilford Adeney; 25 January 1920
- Died: 16 December 2010 (aged 90); Paddington, London, England, United Kingdom
- Education: Royal College of Music
- Occupation: Classical flautist
- Organisations: London Philharmonic Orchestra; English Chamber Orchestra; Melos Ensemble

Richard Gilford Adeney (25 January 1920 – 16 December 2010) was a British flautist who played principal flute with the London Philharmonic Orchestra and the English Chamber Orchestra, was a soloist and a founding member of the Melos Ensemble.

== Career ==
Richard Adeney was born the son of the painter Bernard Adeney (1878–1966). He was determined early in life, to "become the best flute player in the world", as he stated in his autobiography. He was educated at Dartington Hall School and subsequently studied at the Royal College of Music, where one of his contemporaries and close friends was Malcolm Arnold, who composed in 1940 a Grand Fantasia for flute, trumpet and piano for him and a pianist, premiered in February 1941. In his student days in the late 1930s Adeney worked with Vaughan Williams and Sir Malcolm Sargent. In the Second World War he was unconditionally exempted from military service as a conscientious objector.

He joined the London Philharmonic Orchestra in 1941, initially as second flute, and played with them until 1950 and again from 1961 to 1970, under such conductors as Henry Wood and Wilhelm Furtwängler. He was one of the founding members of the Melos Ensemble, principal flautist of the English Chamber Orchestra (ECO) until the 1970s when he was succeeded by William Bennett, and also regularly performed as a soloist. Malcolm Arnold composed a Divertimento for Flute, Oboe and Clarinet for him and other particular friends. Richard Adeney, Sidney Sutcliffe and Stephen Waters gave the work its first performance in 1952. In 1954 Malcolm Arnold wrote a Concerto for Flute and Strings for his friend, who recorded it in 1979, together with the concerto for flute and orchestra (1972).

Richard Adeney was closely associated with Benjamin Britten, and performed in many performances and recordings of the composer's works, notably in 1962 with the Melos Ensemble in the premiere and recording of the War Requiem that Britten conducted himself. He participated in the premiere and first recording of Britten's Curlew River in 1964. He recalled: "Curlew River had more rehearsal time than any other new work that I have ever played". In 1967 he participated in a concert in the Royal Albert Hall including Britten's The Burning Fiery Furnace.

Richard Adeney performed in notable recordings, such as Johann Sebastian Bach's Brandenburg Concertos, which was recorded under Britten's baton, or in his St Matthew Passion conducted by David Willcocks. He premiered the Elegy for flute, harp and string orchestra by John Veale in 1951. With the Melos Ensemble he recorded chamber music for both woodwinds and strings, such as Ravel's Introduction and Allegro along with Osian Ellis (harp), Gervase de Peyer (clarinet), Emanuel Hurwitz and Ivor McMahon (violin), Cecil Aronowitz (viola) and Terence Weil (cello). both 1961 and 1967.

Adeney performed regularly at the Aldeburgh Festival. After having played under conductors as Sergiu Celibidache, Bruno Walter, Sir Thomas Beecham and Claudio Abbado, he ended his professional career in 1990.

Adeney died on 16 December 2010, aged 90, in Paddington.

A concert to celebrate his life was held on 6 May 2011 including performances by his colleague William Bennett.

== Career outside music ==
Richard Adeney has also been a teacher. In 1948 he was teaching courses of the first Bath Assembly (later called Bath International Music Festival). He contributed to the biography of Malcolm Arnold and is the author of flute, his autobiography. A sample provided by the publisher refers to working with Koussevitzky on the Symphony No. 4 by Brahms, musing on the state of mind of the player in the performance. Richard Adeney has also been a photographer whose photos appear on record covers and illustrate his autobiography and other books. One of his pictures showing Britten and the harpist Ellis appears in the Britten-Pears Foundation pages. For twenty-five years he was a volunteer with The Samaritans.

== Publications ==
- flute – An autobiography, Brimstone Press, ISBN 978-1-906385-20-0
- Entries for Richard Adeney in AllMusic
- Entries for Richard Adeney in WorldCat

== Selected recordings and broadcasts ==
- Malcolm Arnold
  - Flute Concertos
  - Sonata for flute and piano
- J.S. Bach
  - Brandenburg Concertos 1–6, Britten, ECO Decca
  - St John Passion Britten, ECO
  - St. Matthew Passion
- Benjamin Britten
  - War Requiem
  - Curlew River
  - Choral Dances (6) from Gloriana Britten, ECO, BBC
- George Frideric Handel Ode for St Cecilia's Day, Britten, ECO, BBC
- Gustav Holst A Fugal Concerto for Flute, Oboe and String Orchestra (1923), ECO
- Bruno Maderna Serenata #2 Decca
- W.A. Mozart Four Flute Quartets, Melos Ensemble
- Luigi Nono Polifonica-Monodia-Ritmica Decca
- Raymond Warren Song for St. Cecilia's Day (1967) BBC
