= Ulysse Delécluse =

French musician

Ulysse Delécluse (1907–1995) was a French clarinetist and professor at the Paris Conservatory. Born 22 January 1907 in Pas-de-Calais, he won first prize in clarinet at the conservatory in 1925 and became an orchestral player. He was hired as a professor in 1948 and taught until 1978. He is the dedicatee of pieces by Darius Milhaud and Henri Tomasi among others.
