= Joseph Calvet =

French violinist (1897–1984)

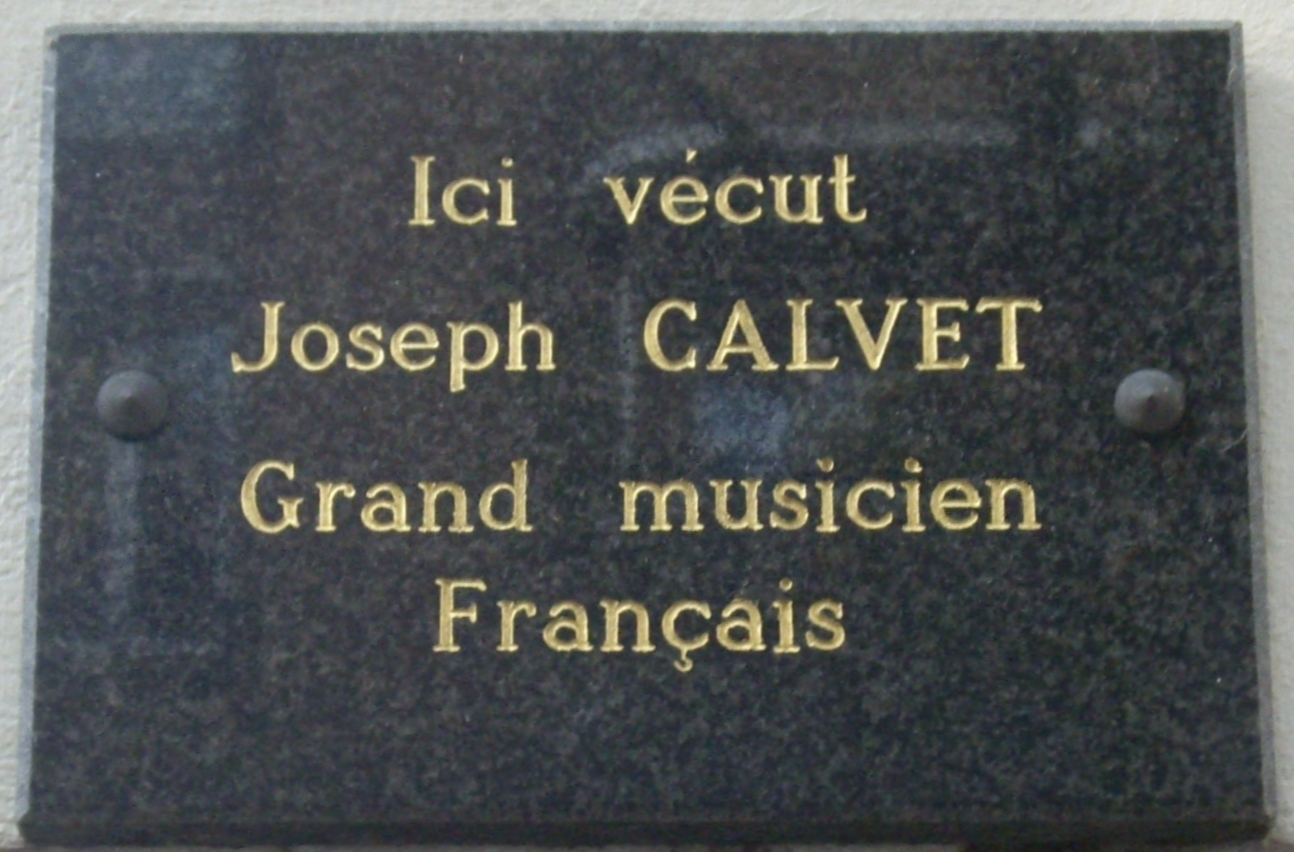
A commemorative plaque is affixed at 2 rue Gervex in the 17th arrondissement of Paris.

Étienne André Joseph Calvet (8 October 1897 – 3 May 1984) was a famous French classical violinist.

In 1919 he founded the celebrated Calvet Quartet.

Calvet died in the 17th arrondissement of Paris at age 86.

== Biography ==
Musical studies

Born in Valence, Tarn-et-Garonne, Calvet began studying the violin at the Conservatoire of Toulouse, where he obtained a First Prize in 1904, then continued his studies at the Conservatoire de Paris, and also obtained a First Prize in 1919. Calvet was trained at the French school of violin which developed between the second half of the 19th and the first half of the 20th.

The Calvet Quartet

In 1919, he created his string quartet with Georges Mignot (2nd violin), replaced by Daniel Guilevitch in 1929), Léon Pascal on viola and Paul Mas on cello. Less than ten years later, the Calvet Quartet's fame was made, and it is with the support of Nadia Boulanger that the Quartet gave the complete Beethoven Quartets in Paris. At the same time, Joseph Calvet and his quartet ardently defended the French music of their contemporaries, notably playing and recording the quartets of Fauré (with Robert Casadesus), Debussy and Ravel. This first formation was to end at the beginning of the Second World War with the departure of Daniel Guilevitch - who was Jewish - to the United States (where he was to adopt the name Daniel Guilet), and it was only at the end of the war that Joseph Calvet somehow resurrected the quartet with new partners: violinist Jean Champeil, violist Maurice Husson and cellist Manuel Recasens. This new formation was a great success after the war, and created quartets of the French repertoire, notably that of Florent Schmitt in 1948, as the previous formation had done with Guy Ropartz and Jean Françaix. The Calvet Quartet was finally disbanded in 1950.

== Historical recording ==
- Beethoven's String quartet n° 1 Op. 18 and n° 14 Op. 131 (1936, 1938); Teldec Telefunken Legacy 3984-28413-2
- Fauré's Piano Quartet in C minor with Robert Casadesus (1935); Sony Casadesus edition 5034012000
- Schubert's String Quartet No. 14 (Death and the Maiden)

== Sources ==
- Dictionnaire de la Musique, éditions Larousse
