= Neill Sanders =

British classical horn player (1923–1992)

- Born: 24 November 1923
- Died: 19 April 1992 (aged 68)
- Occupation: Classical horn player
- Organizations: London Philharmonic Orchestra; BBC Symphony Orchestra; Melos Ensemble; Western Michigan University

Neill Joseph Sanders (24 November 1923 – 19 April 1992) was a British horn player, principal horn of the London Philharmonic Orchestra and the BBC Symphony Orchestra, and for 29 years a member of the Melos Ensemble. He was a professor at Western Michigan University in Kalamazoo, Michigan and founded the Fontana Ensemble and the Fontana Concert Society with its summer festival.

== Career ==
Neill Sanders grew up in a musical family. At the age of 16 he was already on a tour with the tenor Richard Tauber. At 18 he played principal horn in the London Symphony Orchestra for a short time. After the war he was principal horn again with the orchestra and also with the BBC Symphony Orchestra. He played second horn in the Philharmonia Orchestra for seven years with Dennis Brain. They both appeared with The London Wind Players in a Cambridge Summer Festival in 1950. They also were members of the London Baroque Ensemble, founded and conducted by Karl Haas, and recorded among others Serenades by Dvorak (1951) and Mozart (1952), Sonatinas for Wind Instruments by C.P.E. Bach, a Partita by Dittersdorf and music by Haydn and Gounod in 1953. The two horn players were featured in a lecture recital on "The Early Horn" on the BBC in 1955. Francis Poulenc wrote an Elégie for Brain, first performed by Neill Sanders with Poulenc at the piano, in a BBC broadcast on 17 February 1958.

=== Melos Ensemble ===
Neill Sanders was a founding member of the Melos Ensemble in 1950 and played with them for 29 years. They participated in premières of numerous works by Benjamin Britten including the War Requiem. The composer conducted the Melos Ensemble in the first performance in Coventry in 1962 and also in the first recording in 1963. Neill was a personal friend of Britten's and played principal horn for the Aldeburgh Festival, taking part in the premiere and first recordings of the church parables, Curlew River, The Burning Fiery Furnace and The Prodigal Son.

=== Neill Sanders Mouthpiece ===
He designed a special wide, slightly concave mouthpiece for the instrument, to spread the pressure and to increase endurance. Known as the "Neill Sanders Mouthpiece" or the "Neill Sanders Rim", it was produced into the late 1980s and is still in demand.

=== Teaching in London and Michigan ===
In London he taught many students who became principal horn players. In 1970 he was appointed Professor for Horn at Western Michigan University in Kalamazoo, Michigan. He also taught as guest professor at Michigan State University. On the campus he played in the Western Brass Quintet (professors of music at the university) the first performance of Masques by Ramon Zupko (also professor of the university) on 15 February 1974.

=== Fontana Chamber Arts ===
Neill Sanders returned to London every year to play, especially to continue his part in the Melos Ensemble, until 1979. Then he founded a similar large chamber ensemble in Michigan, the Fontana Ensemble, consisting of a string quintet, a wind quintet, and piano. In 1980 he founded the Fontana Concert Society, and in 1980 six concerts were performed at a first summer festival. He was its Executive and artistic director until his death.

In 1993 composer Mark Schultz wrote Podunk Lake for Amplified Horn Solo for the Fontana Festival in memory of Neill Sanders. The Neill Sanders Endowment for New Music Fund in the Kalamazoo Community Foundation bears his name.

== Recordings ==
His long discography includes many notable recordings with the Melos Ensemble. Some of the Philharmonia horn section recordings, including Haydn's “Hornsignal“ Symphony are included on Sotone CD 103. CD 108 features chamber music with horn, Johannes Brahms Trio in E-flat, Op. 40, Franz Schubert Auf dem Strom and Robert Schumann Adagio und Allegro, Op. 70.

Neill Sanders and other classical musicians participated in Sgt. Pepper's Lonely Hearts Club Band (The Beatles' 1967 studio album).
