= Kenneth Sillito =

English violinist and conductor

Kenneth Sillito (born 5 March 1939 in Newcastle upon Tyne, England) is an English violinist and conductor.

== Biography ==
Kenneth Sillito was born into a working-class family to Walter and Margaret Sillito. He grew up in Stakeford. He studied at the Royal Academy of Music with David Martin (1911–1982) and in Rome with Remy Prìncipe (1889–1977).

His first position was with the English Chamber Orchestra, which he conducted until 1973. In 1966 he founded the Gabrieli Quartet, where he was first violinist until 1986. In 1971 he was elected a Fellow of the Royal Academy of Music (FRAM). (Note: The Fellow of the Royal Academy of Music award is given to graduates who have made a significant contribution to the musical profession.)

In 1980 he began working with the Academy of St. Martin in the Fields, which he later directed, and became artistic director together with Iona Brown. He also directed the St. Vitus Academy Chamber Ensemble, Martin in the Fields. He worked with the academy until 2012.

== Work ==
During his career, he has participated in a large number of musical recordings. His autobiography and memoirs From the Leader's Chair were published in November 2019.

== Awards ==
In 2017, he received the Cobbett Medal for service to chamber music from the Worshipful Company of Musicians.
