= Clarinet Quintet (Mozart) =

Musical composition by Mozart

- by W. A. Mozart
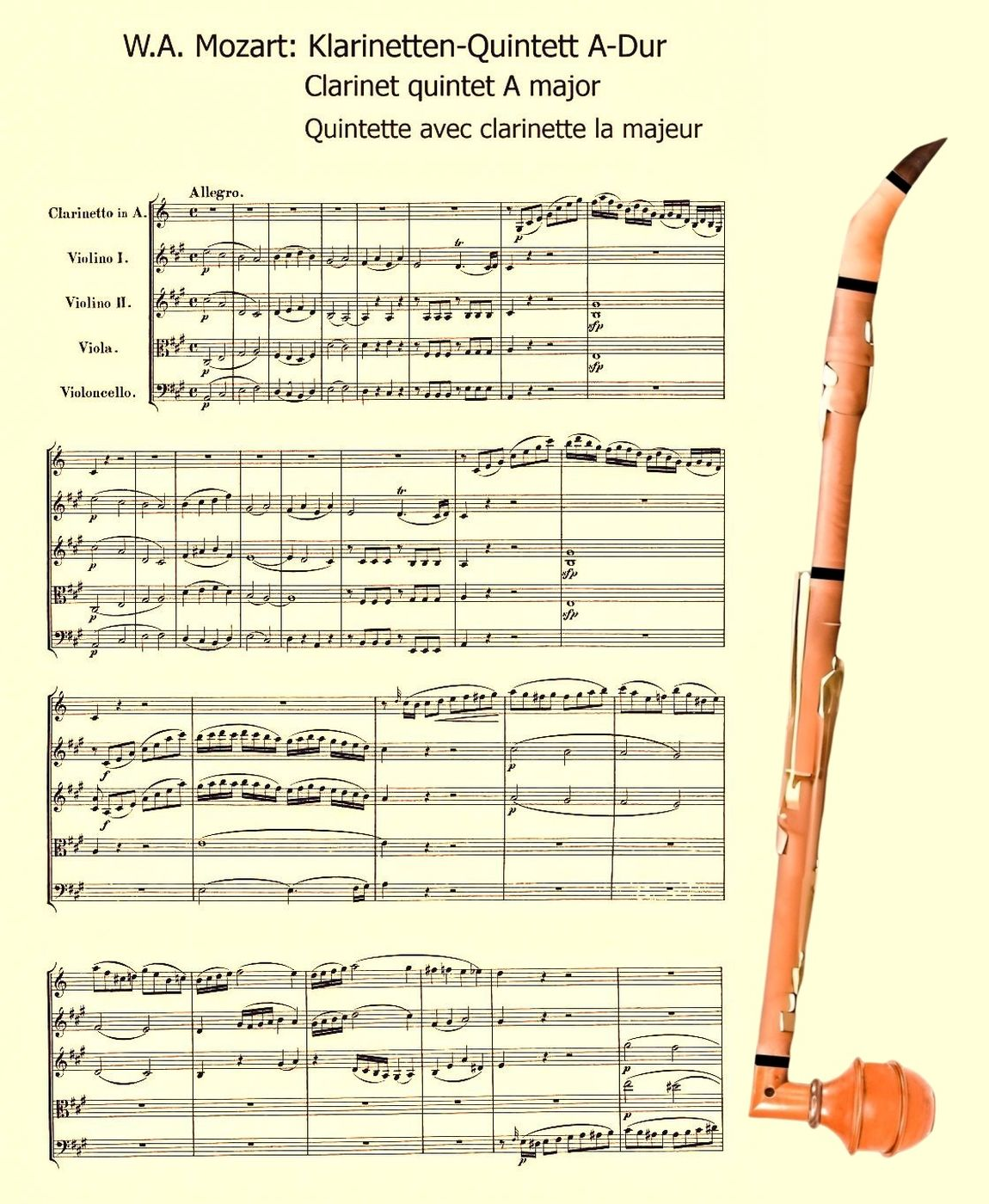
- Score with historical basset clarinet
- Key: A major
- Catalogue: K. 581
- Composed: 1789
- Dedication: Anton Stadler
- Duration: 35 minutes
- Movements: 4
- Scoring: (Basset) clarinet in A; violin I; violin II; viola; cello

Premiere
- Date: December 22, 1789
- Location: Tonkünstler-Societät in Vienna
- Performers: Anton Stadler (clarinet); Joseph Zistler (violin); Wolfgang Amadeus Mozart (viola); others unknown

Wolfgang Amadeus Mozart's Clarinet Quintet, K. 581, was written in 1789 for the clarinetist Anton Stadler. A clarinet quintet is a work for one clarinet and a string quartet. Although originally written for basset clarinet, in contemporary performances it usually is played on a clarinet in A.

It is Mozart's only completed clarinet quintet and is one of the earliest and best-known works that was written especially for the instrument. It remains to this day one of the most admired of the composer's works.

Sometimes the quintet is referred to as the Stadler Quintet; Mozart so described it in a letter of April 1790. Mozart also wrote a trio for clarinet, viola, and piano for Stadler, the so-called Kegelstatt Trio, in 1786. Stadler was a friend to Mozart who was very talented in the instrument.

== Composition and premiere ==
The composer indicated that the work was finished on 29 September 1789. It received its premiere on 22 December of the same year, in one of the four annual Vienna performances of the Tonkünstler-Societät, an organization that existed to fund pensions for widows and orphans of musicians. The main item on the program was a cantata, Il natale d'Apollo, by Vincenzo Righini; Mozart's work was performed between the two halves of this work. The solo clarinet part was taken by Stadler, the first violin part by Joseph Zistler (1744–1794).

== Structure ==
The work consists of the following four movements and, with the intended repetitions, has a duration of between 31 and 38 minutes, usually approximately 35 minutes.

1. Allegro, A major, time = 4/4, 197 bars, where bars 1 to 79 and bars 80 to 197 are repeated. This movement shows the typical sonata form with exposition, development, and recapitulation.
2. Larghetto, D major, time = 3/4, 85 bars
3. Menuetto with Trio I in A minor and Trio II in A major, time = 3/4, 31 + 41 + 51 bars. Here, too, the individual sections are repeated.
4. Allegretto con variazioni, A major (Variation III in A minor), time = 2/2. The presentation of the theme with 16 bars is followed by four variations with three times 16 and one time 20 bars. This is followed by two basically independent small movements: an Adagio with 21 bars and an Allegro with 36 bars. Here, too, repetition of the individual sections.

=== I. Allegro ===
I. Allegro
Vlad Weverbergh on a replica of the basset clarinet by Anton Stadler with the Terra Nova Collective (recorded in 2017)

The first movement sets the mood for the entire piece. Stephen Rumph points out that the contrast between the hymn-like harmonies of the strings' opening and the brilliant style of the clarinet's first entry, which punctuates the two halves of the strings' theme. Much of the movement's musical interest derives from the balance between these two extremes.

=== II. Larghetto ===
II. Larghetto

The second movement opens with a six-bar transition in place of a central development section, which opposes a first section consisting mostly of a clarinet melody over muted strings against a second group of themes in which – as in the first movement – several upward runs of scales are given to the first violin, alternating with brief phrases of clarinet melody. These scales are given to the clarinet in the recapitulation (bar 51). In the last few bars of the movement, more chromatic than the rest, the scales turn into triplet arpeggios traded between the strings under the closing clarinet phrases.

=== III. Menuetto ===
III. Menuetto

The third movement consists of a minuet and, unusually, two trios. The first trio is for the strings alone, with a theme that has a signature acciaccatura every few notes. The second trio is a clarinet solo over the strings, whereas in the minuet the roles are distributed more evenly.

=== IV. Allegretto con variazioni ===
IV. Allegretto con variazioni

The finale is in variation form, unexpectedly substituting for the more conventional rondo. There are five variations. The theme is in two repeated halves, with the clarinet joining in, but only for a few of its bars. As often with Mozart, phrase structure is generally the same throughout the variations even if other qualities change – the theme consists of four four-bar phrases (Mozart is often more irregular in his phrasing than this), the first going harmonically from A to E, the second back from E to A, etc. and likewise with the variations.

The first of its variations gives the clarinet a new theme, in counterpoint with the theme of the variations divided amongst the quartet. The second alternates phrases for quartet only with phrases for full quintet, the latter answering the former. The third, in A minor, also begins without clarinet. It features a viola melody – also with signature acciaccatura – sometimes described as sobbing. The clarinet joins in to finish. The major mode returns for the fourth variation, as does the main theme to the accompaniment of semiquaver virtuosity – given to the clarinet only in the first repeated half, first violin and clarinet in the second. There are four bars of dramatic interruption leading to a pause; the next variation is a lyrical Adagio. A transition leads to an Allegro coda, containing much of a variation itself.

== Analysis ==
There are a number of similarities between this quintet and Mozart's Clarinet Concerto. Both are in the key of A major and were written for the same soloist, Anton Stadler. Both pieces are written for the basset clarinet, which has an extended lower range. Also, the first theme of the first movement of each piece begins with a falling minor third. Both the second movements are in the same key (D major) and have similar characters and many similar phrases, although they have different tempo markings. There is a direct quotation of two bars in the second movement of the Quintet of the clarinet line in the Concerto's second movement.

Alfred Einstein notes that while the clarinet "predominates as primus inter pares" (first amongst equals) this is nonetheless "chamber music work of the finest kind" and the roles are distributed more equally than they would be in a more concertante quintet for wind and strings.

== Fragment second Clarinet Quintet ==
A score fragment exists for a second (although possibly written first) clarinet quintet in B-flat major, of which a complete exposition survives. It is possible that Mozart completed the movement, as the score continues into the development section on the last surviving page. This fragment is unlikely to be a sketch, as it bears no marks of correction. (However, Mozart re-used many of the thematic ideas in the fragment, in the same order, in the first movement of his String Quartet K. 589.) Nevertheless, the quintet K. 581 in A major is Mozart's sole surviving complete work for clarinet quintet.

== Fragment of a Rondo in A major ==
The fragment in A, Anhang 88, for basset clarinet in A and string quartet may originally have been intended as the fourth movement of KV 581. The sparsely notated fragment of 111 bars shares the opening theme of Ferrando's aria, no. 24, from Così fan tutte. Several musicians have made completions including Otto Bach (1870), Robert Levin (2012), and Craig Hill (2022).

== In popular culture ==
In "Goodbye, Farewell and Amen", the final episode of the American television series M*A*S*H, Charles Winchester learns that five Chinese soldiers who surrendered to him are musicians, one of whom plays a theme from the Clarinet Quintet, and Winchester proceeds to teach them the entire piece. Part of the reason for the inclusion of this clarinet piece was because Alan Alda's (who plays the character Hawkeye) wife is clarinetist Arlene Alda. She was associate principal clarinet of the Houston Symphony and former student of Leon Russianoff.
