= Octet (Beethoven) =

Work for wind instruments by Ludwig van Beethoven

The Octet in E♭ major by Ludwig van Beethoven, Op. 103, is a work for two oboes, two clarinets, two bassoons, and two horns. Beethoven wrote the work in 1792 in Bonn before he established himself in Vienna. He reworked and expanded the Octet in 1795 as his first String Quintet, Op. 4. The Octet was not published until 1834 by Artaria, thus explaining the high opus number despite its date of composition.

The frontispiece of the autograph score contains the phrase "in a concert", proving that the piece was destined (at least at one stage) for a concert.

== Structure ==
Octet Op. 103
I. Allegro

II. Andante

III. Menuetto

IV. Presto
Performed by the Soni Ventorum Wind Quintet with other artists in 1981 at Meany Hall

The composition is in four movements: (Note: In the composer's manuscript, the beginning of an andante movement is written in following the Menuetto. Discarded by the composer, it was later published as the Rondino in E-flat major, WoO. 25.)

1. Allegro
2. Andante
3. Menuetto
4. Presto
