= Arche (oratorio) =

Oratorio by Jörg Widmann

ARCHE
- Oratorio by Jörg Widmann
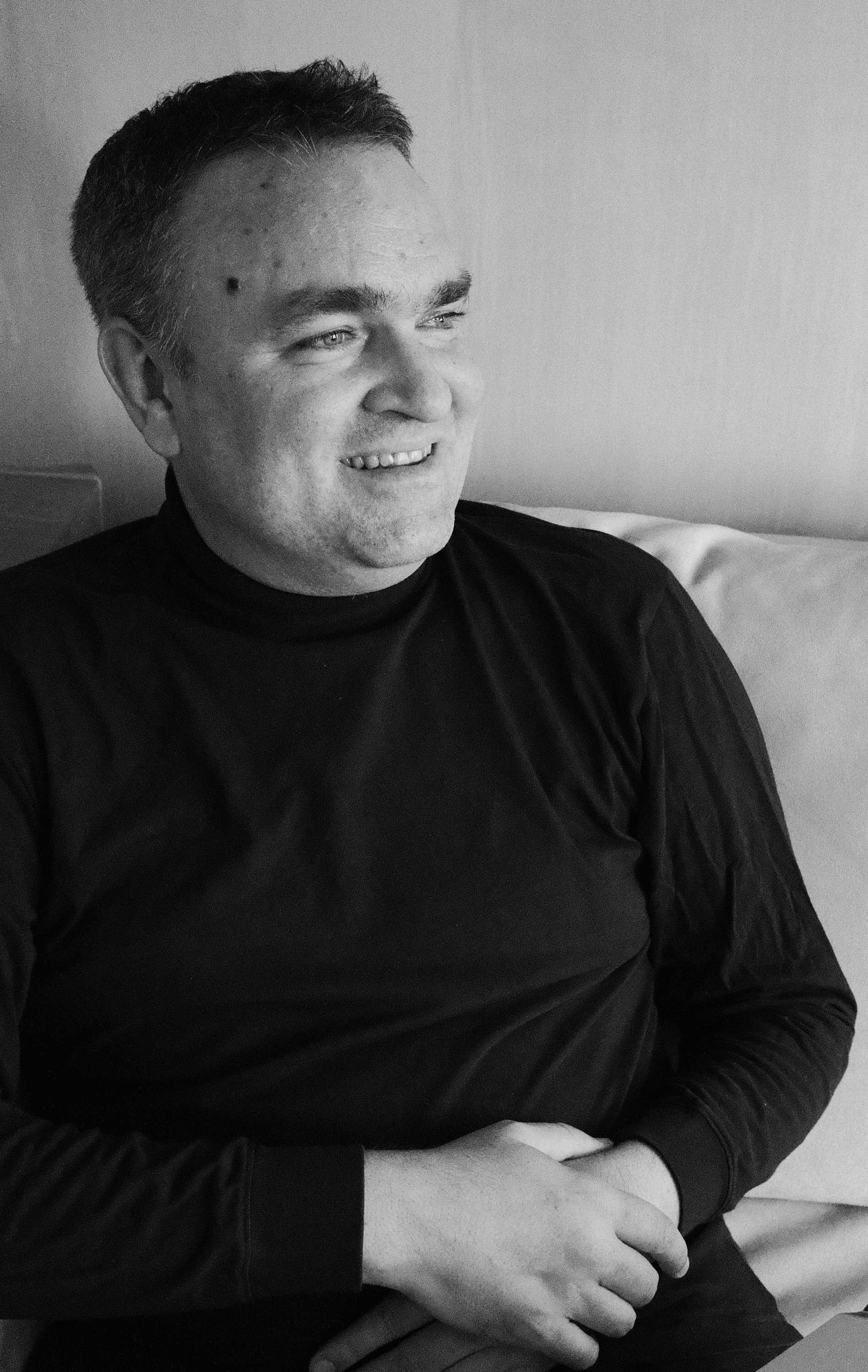
- The composer in 2025
- English: Ark
- Period: Contemporary
- Commissioned by: Hamburg Philharmonic State Orchestra
- Text: by several authors, from the Bible and Mass
- Language: German; Latin
- Composed: 2016
- Published: 2016: Mainz
- Publisher: Schott Music
- Recorded: 13 January 2017
- Duration: 100:00
- Scoring: soprano; baritone; boy soprano; two children narrators; children's choir; two mixed choirs; organ; orchestra

Premiere
- Date: 13 January 2017
- Location: Elbphilharmonie, Hamburg
- Conductor: Kent Nagano
- Performers: Hamburg Philharmonic State Orchestra

Arche (German: [ˈaʁçə]; Ark, stylised as ARCHE) is an oratorio for soloists, choirs, organ and orchestra by Jörg Widmann. It was commissioned by Kent Nagano and the Hamburg Philharmonic State Orchestra for the opening of the Elbphilharmonie, Hamburg. In the premiere on 13 January 2017, he conducted 300 performers.

== Background ==
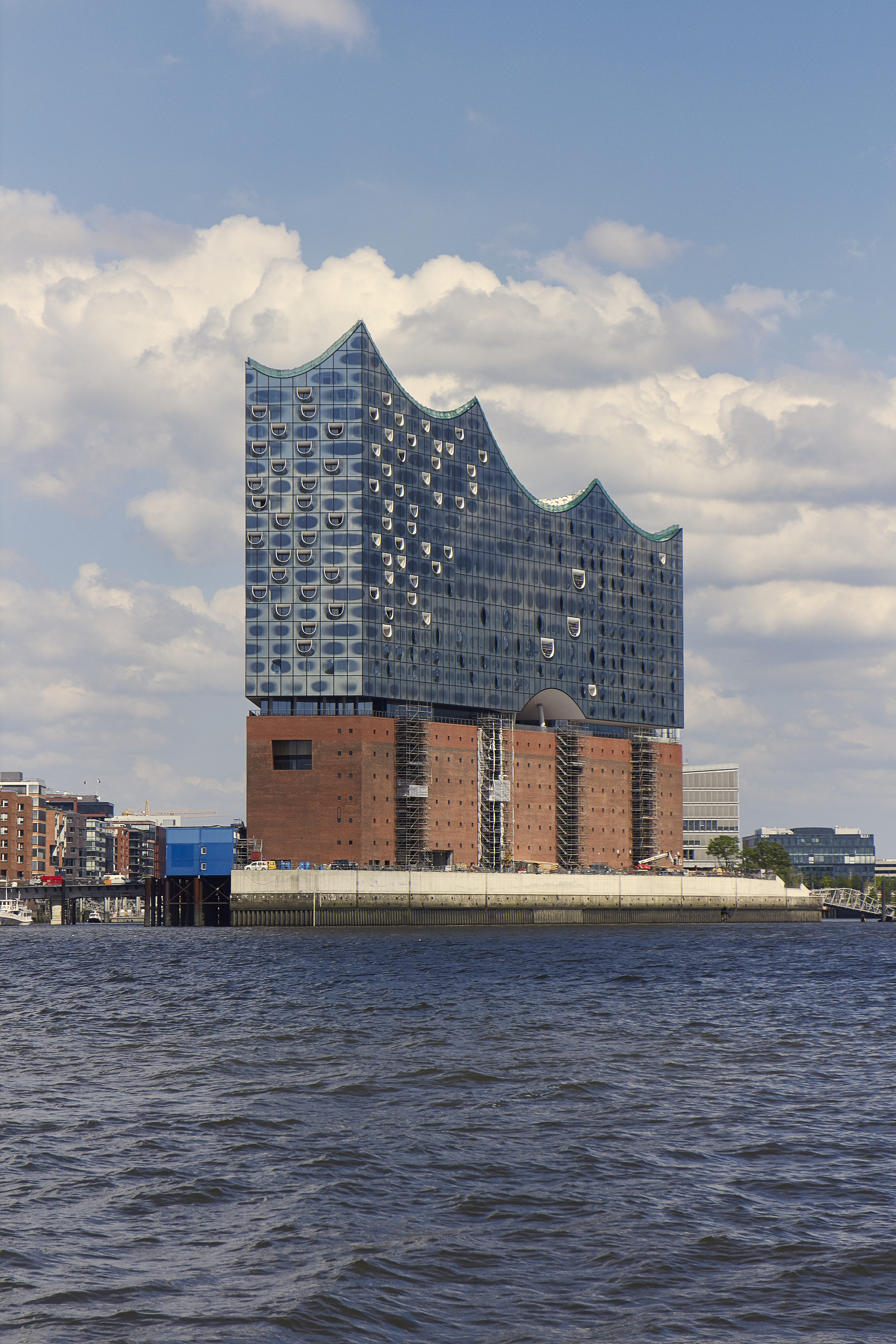
Elbphilharmonie (July 2015)

Jörg Widmann composed the oratorio ARCHE in 2016. Kent Nagano commissioned a full-length work for choir and orchestra and did not make any content restrictions. The commission of the Hamburg Philharmonic State Orchestra for the opening of the Elbphilharmonie has 300 performers with two soloists, two adult choirs and a children's choir. Two child narrators chronicle the acts of creation and the flood. Widmann's work was inspired by the Elbphilharmonie under construction; the concert hall looks like a ship. (Note: Hamburg has a long oratorio tradition with Georg Philipp Telemann and Carl Philipp Emanuel Bach.)

== Structure ==
ARCHE is structured in five sections, (Note: In analogy to the quintipartite form of the Ordinary Mass.) in which Widmann roams through more than 3000 years of cultural and 300 years of music history. Antithetic or dualistic conceptions characterize large parts of the oratorio. Widmann juxtaposes word with deed, construction with destruction, love with hate and religious traditions with the ideals of enlightenment. Sacred references are placed into a secular context.

=== I – Fiat lux / Es werde Licht ===
- Let there be light is based on the Genesis creation narrative. (Note: See also Joseph Haydn's oratorio The Creation.)

Beginning with silence: Let there be sound. At first noise-like sounds of wind and nature and "pitchless rustles and whispers", representing chaos. Air sounds and breath noises are created with wind instruments. The acts of creation are partly accompanied with heavenly chorales and burlesque, ironical musical episodes. The two children narrators describe the act of creation.

=== II – Die Sintflut ===
- The Flood/Deluge is based on Genesis flood narrative and Noah's Ark.

The catastrophic character is manifested by cascading masses of sound. The music of this section is partly taken from Scene II "Flood and Star Terror" of Widmann's opera Babylon. The flood myth of Sumerian narratives, also manifested in the Epic of Gilgamesh, likely references an event around 6700 BC. The punishing god acts brutally against humanity.

=== III – Die Liebe ===
- The Love

The center section is characterized by antiphony between the lovers (soprano and baritone) with tragic operatic fragments. All forms of love and hate are found within it – dark, bright, joyous, vile and jealousy. Because of the jealousy of humans, Die Liebe leads to a double murder in a delusional fever.

=== IV – Dies irae ===
- Day of wrath

The strict setting of Dies irae represents the impending apocalypse with the clash of good and evil and gods last judgement. (Note: The Latin text Dies irae is usually part of a Requiem.) Diverse Requiem settings clash in a collage-like manner. The human response is enlightenment and Friedrich Schiller's Ode to Joy. (Note: The poem Ode to Joy is rooted in the philosophy of the Enlightenment.) Widmann sets verses of the poem to music, that Beethoven didn't use ("Destroy our book of guilt! Reconcile the whole world!"). His setting of the poem cites Beethoven's Choral Fantasy. (Note: The Choral Fantasy is a precursor of the last movement of Beethoven's Symphony No. 9.)

=== V – Dona nobis pacem ===
- Grant us peace

Modern Zeitgeist is represented by an alphabet rap of the children's choir ("Facebook, Google, NATO"). The response is a Dona nobis pacem, (Note: From the Catholic Mass liturgy.) a plea for peace, performed by a boy soprano and the choirs. Man bears the fate of the earth in his own hands. Widmann did not set a catastrophic counterpoint in the final fifth movement. The resolution of the final cadence is not complete, the hope for love, charity and a rational humanity.

== Scoring ==
The setting contains voices and a large orchestra.

- Vocal soloists: soprano, baritone, boy soprano
- Choirs: children's choir, two mixed choirs
- two children narrators (boy and girl)

=== Instrumentation ===
- Woodwinds: 4 flutes (all with B foot, all doubling piccolo, 3rd doubling alto flute, 4th doubling bass flute), 4 oboes (2nd doubling oboe d'amore, 3rd and 4th doubling lotus flute, 3rd doubling cor anglais, 4th doubling heckelphone), 4 clarinets in B♭ (all doubling in A, 2nd doubling clarinet in E♭, 3rd doubling bass clarinet in B♭, 4th doubling contrabass clarinet in B♭), 4 bassoons (3rd and 4th doubling double bassoon)
- Brass: 6 horns (1st and 2nd doubling natural horn), 4 trumpets in C (1st and 2nd doubling in B♭, 1st doubling high B♭ ad lib.), 4 trombones (3rd and 4th doubling bass trombone ad lib.), tuba
- Strings: 16 violins I, 14 violins II, 12 violas, 10 cellos, 8 double basses (all with 5 strings)
- Percussion: 4 players, timpani
- 2 harps, accordion, glass harmonica, 2 pianos (2nd doubling celesta), organ

== Text ==
The language of the oratorio is German and Latin. Widmann selected a variety of texts from different centuries, including the libretti of his operas Das Gesicht im Spiegel and Babylon:

- Matthias Claudius
- Klabund
- Heinrich Heine
- Peter Sloterdijk
- Hans Christian Andersen
- Clemens Brentano
- Friedrich Schiller
- Francis of Assisi
- Friedrich Nietzsche
- Roland Schimmelpfennig
- Thomas of Celano
- Michelangelo

and from Des Knaben Wunderhorn, Bible and Mass.

== Premiere and performances ==
Widmann's oratorio ARCHE had its world premiere on 13 January 2017 on the occasion of the opening festivities of the Elbphilharmonie in Hamburg. It was performed by the Hamburg Philharmonic State Orchestra conducted by Kent Nagano. Soloists were Marlis Petersen (soprano), Thomas E. Bauer (baritone), Gabriel Böer (boy soprano), and Jonna Plathe and Boris Özden (children narrators). The choirs were Chor der Hamburgischen Staatsoper, Audi Jugendchorakademie and Hamburger Alsterspatzen.

On 12 November 2022, Karina Canellakis conducted the Radio Filharmonisch Orkest at Concertgebouw, Amsterdam.

On 4 and 5 June 2023, the oratorio was revived at Elbphilharmonie, Hamburg. Bauer would reprise his performance as the baritone soloist, while Mojca Erdmann sang the soprano solo.

== Reception ==
A few German newspapers critically reviewed the premiere of ARCHE. The neue musikzeitung stated that the oratorio is capable of winning a majority. Eleonore Büning, reviewer of the Frankfurter Allgemeine Zeitung, wrote about the enthusiasm of the audience, and that Widmann's splendid, richly orchestrated music breaks all genre and style boundaries. Süddeutsche Zeitung wrote, that the work is diverging, and also undecided in its message. Andrew Clements, reviewer of The Guardian, wrote about the CD production: "fails to convince".

== Awards ==
Widmann received the Opus Klassik "Composer of the Year" 2019 Award for ARCHE. In 2023, the composer received the Bach Prize of the Free and Hanseatic City of Hamburg, general music director Kent Nagano became honorary conductor of the Hamburg Philharmonic State Orchestra.

== Recording ==
- ARCHE, Marlis Petersen, Thomas E. Bauer, Iveta Apkalna, Kent Nagano, Philharmonisches Staatsorchester Hamburg (ECM 2018)
