= Towards Paradise (Widmann) =

2021 trumpet concerto by Jörg Widmann

Towards Paradise (Labyrinth VI)
- Trumpet concerto by Jörg Widmann
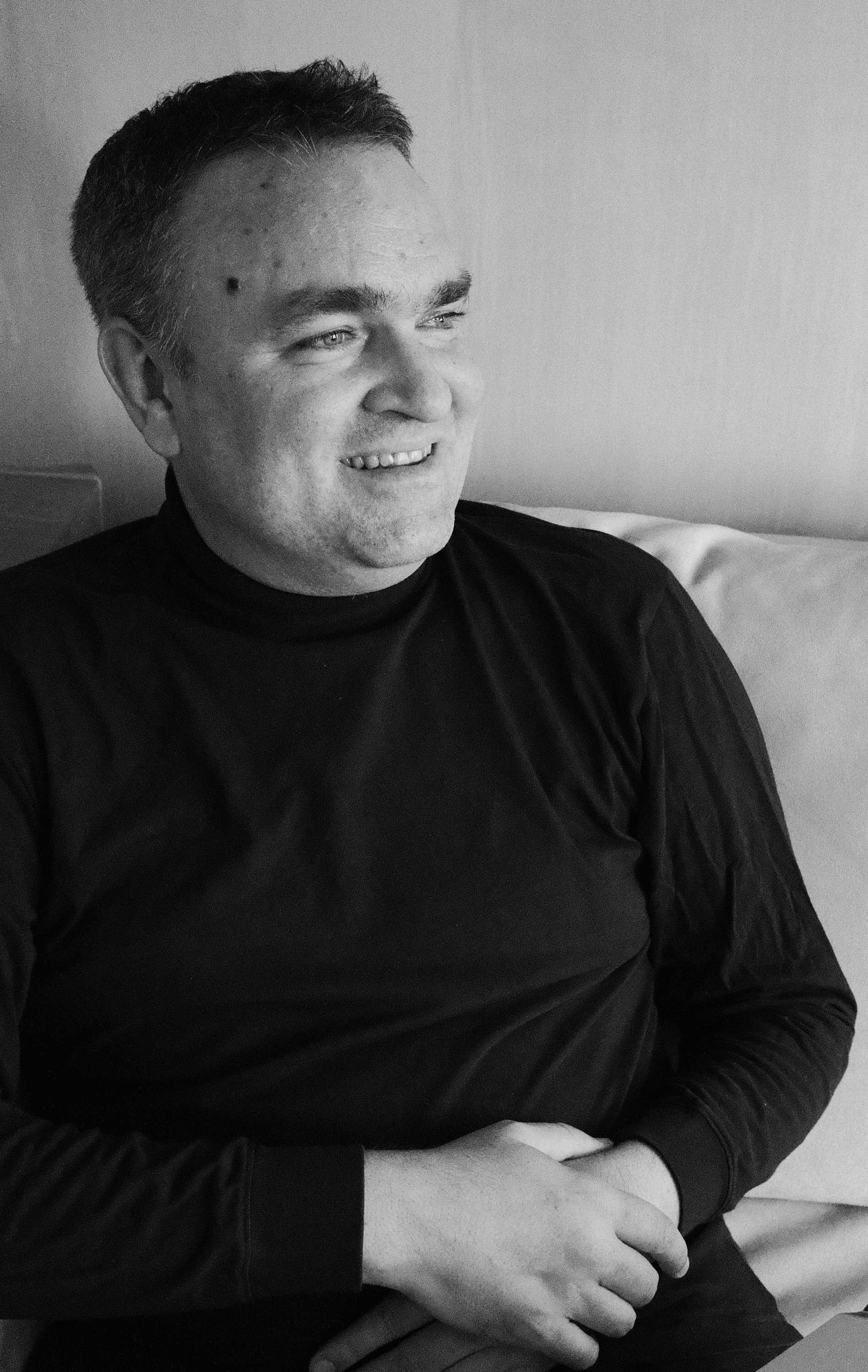
- The composer in 2025
- Period: Contemporary
- Commissioned by: Leipzig Gewandhaus Orchestra; Boston Symphony Orchestra
- Composed: 2021
- Published: 2021: Mainz
- Publisher: Schott Music
- Duration: 37:00
- Scoring: trumpet and orchestra, percussion

Premiere
- Date: 23 September 2021
- Location: Gewandhaus, Leipzig
- Conductor: Andris Nelsons
- Performers: Håkan Hardenberger; Leipzig Gewandhaus Orchestra

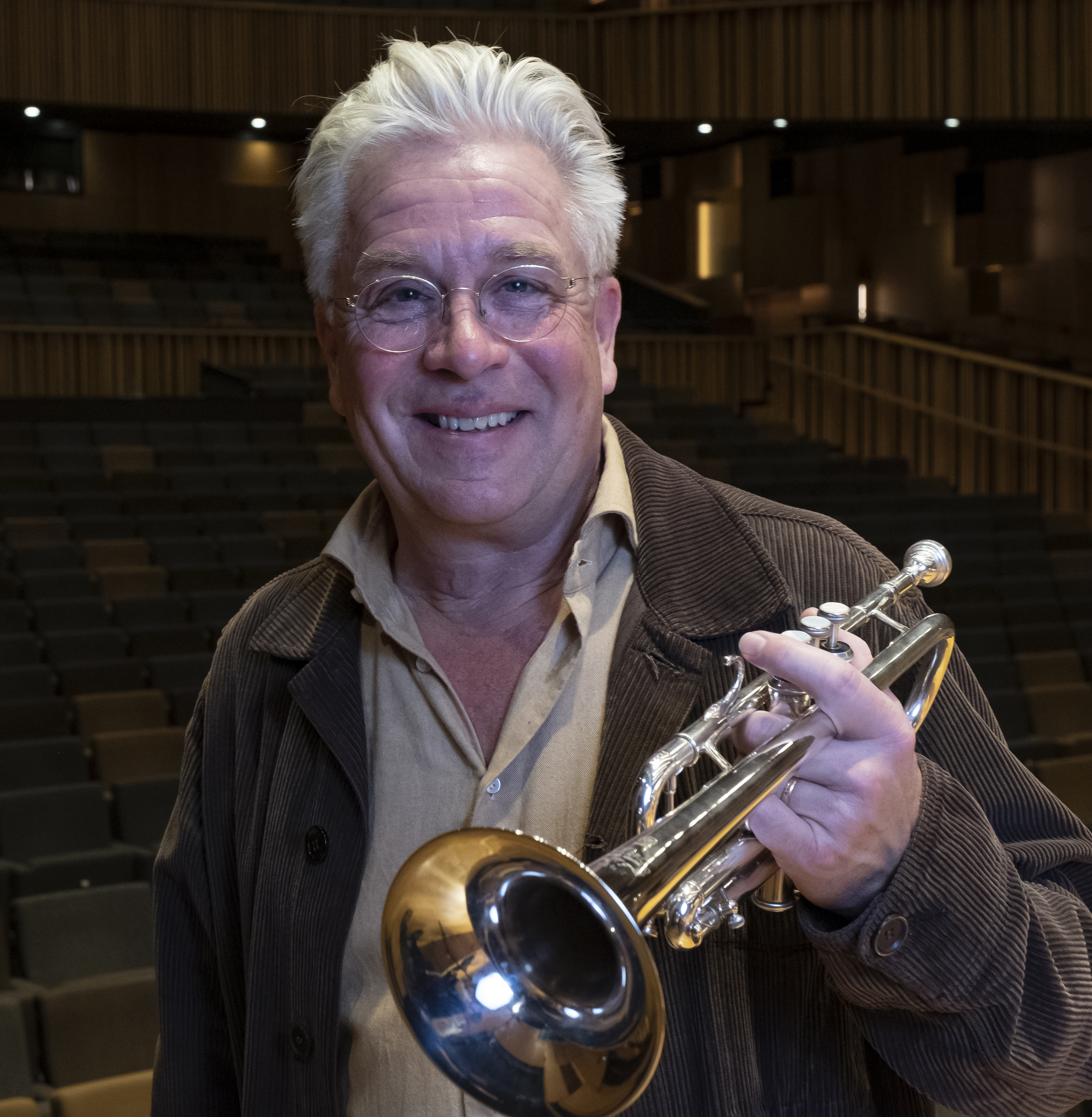
Soloist Hardenberger in 2021, News Øresund, Malmö, Sweden

Towards Paradise (Labyrinth VI) is a trumpet concerto by German composer Jörg Widmann. It was composed in 2021 and premiered on 23 September 2021 by soloist Håkan Hardenberger and the Gewandhausorchester Leipzig conducted by Andris Nelsons at Gewandhaus.

== Background ==
Widmann's second trumpet concerto (Note: Towards Paradise represents a counter-proposal to the first trumpet concerto ad absurdum (2002).) was commissioned by Gewandhausorchester Leipzig and Boston Symphony Orchestra. The composition is influenced by jazz trumpeter Miles Davis (Note: Widmann had visited three Miles Davis concerts.) and the lockdowns enforced by the COVID-19 pandemic. (Note: Widmann: "I wanted to counter the sobering reality of the corona pandemic with something utopian.")

Widmann describes the work:

After my hypertrophic virtuoso concert piece ad absurdum 20 years ago, I now felt the urge to compose a large-scale, angelic lyrical trumpet concerto: Towards Paradise. The trumpet soloist sets off on a labyrinthine journey through a wide spectrum of psychological and tonal zones, also featuring wild and craggy orchestral abysses leading into the open—towards a utopian state of suspension.

The concerto is part six of the Labyrinth (Maze) cycle, started in 2005. The associations in a maze are "search for orientation" and "spatial perception". Labyrinth VI also refers to the labyrinthine difficulties occurring during the process of composing.

Labyrinth

Widmann and Hardenberger were in close collaboration, before and during the creation process of the concerto.

== Structure ==
The demanding trumpet concerto is an "epic" large-scale one-movement work.

The solitary solo trumpet starts playing offstage right side in lowest registers, the hall at the beginning in darkness. The melancholic melody played by the introverted, isolated trumpeter (Note: Similar to Widmann's Viola Concerto (2015).) can't be located exactly. The soloist enters the stage and takes up contact and dialogue with an orchestral trumpet player. (Note: This sequence reminds of Charles Ives's The Unanswered Question.)

The soloist is embarking on a journey, with confrontative and fragile moments. The stage setting provides in total nine solo positions facing different groups of the orchestra. The music is varied: melancholy, assertive, mischievous, and reflective. When looking for musical partners, the protagonist is rudely dismissed by the trumpet group.

The sound of the trumpet is modified by following effects: (Note: Playing positions of Miles Davis.)

- player's back to the audience
- pointing the trumpet bell towards the floor
- toward the audience
- mutes

At the end, the light fades out and the soloist leaves the stage on the left side playing a "glimmering, ethereal high E♭", reaching an oasis.

== Instrumentation ==
- Woodwinds: 3 flutes (2nd and 3rd doubling piccolo), 3 oboes (2nd doubling English horn), 3 clarinets (2nd doubling bass clarinet, 3rd doubling contrabass clarinet), 3 bassoons (3rd doubling contrabassoon)
- Brass: 4 horns, 3 trumpets, 3 trombones (3rd doubling bass trombone), tuba
- Strings: 12 first violins, 10 second violins, 8 violas, 6 cellos, 4 double basses
- Percussion: timpani, percussion (5 players recommended) I. glockenspiel, crotales, xylophone, 2 plate bells, triangle, 3 cymbals, sizzle cymbal, snare drum, 3 tom-toms, bass drum, metal chimes, ratchet, wood block, waterphone; II. glockenspiel, xylophone, vibraphone, tubular bells, 3 cymbals, Chinese cymbal, Thai gongs, 3 tam-tams, water tam-tam, 2 high Brazilian tambourines, 2 bongos, snare drum, 3 tom-toms, bass drum, flexatone, guiro; III. tubular bells, 3 plate bells, triangle, 3 cymbals, Chinese cymbal, sizzle cymbal, crash cymbals, Thai gongs, tam-tam, 2 Brazilian tambourines, 2 bongos, snare drum, 3 tom-toms, bass drum, rain stick; IV. 3 plate bells, triangle, 3 cymbals, Chinese cymbal, sizzle cymbal, Thai gongs, water gong, 3 tam-tams, tambourine, bass drum, metal chimes, ratchet, mounted castanets, 3 temple blocks, metal block (with 2 hammers), rain stick, whip, flexatone; V. 3 tam-tams, ratchet
- 2 harps, accordion, celesta

The orchestration is characterized by a vast percussion array.

== Premiere and Performances ==
Soloist: Håkan Hardenberger (trumpet)

- 23 September 2021, world premiere, Andris Nelsons, Leipzig Gewandhaus Orchestra, Gewandhaus, Leipzig (further performances on 24 and 26 September)
- 18 November 2021, American premiere, Andris Nelsons, Boston Symphony Orchestra, Boston Symphony Hall, Boston (further performances on 19 and 20 November)
- 4 February 2023, David Robertson, WDR Sinfonieorchester Köln, Elbphilharmonie, Hamburg
- 14 March 2024, Andris Nelsons, Royal Stockholm Philharmonic Orchestra, Konserthuset, Stockholm
- 28 March 2024, Daniel Harding, London Symphony Orchestra, Barbican Centre
- 7 April 2024, Jörg Widmann, Mozarteum Orchestra Salzburg, Großes Festspielhaus, Salzburg
- 6 June 2024, Jörg Widmann, NDR Radiophilharmonie, Großer Sendesaal, Hanover

As of 2024, the trumpet concerto has been performed 15 times.

== Reception ==
Reviewing the US premiere, The Boston Globe's A.Z. Madonna wrote: "In either case, after 40 minutes in Widmann's labyrinth, paradise was an intermission." Jeffrey Gantz wrote in The Boston Musical Intelligencer: "Birth stage left, death stage right, and in between a lifetime of searching." Kevin Wells in Bachtrack: "labyrinth of textures and layers" Jonathan Blumhofer in Boston Classical Review: "The solo writing is highly virtuosic in register, timbre and articulation." and "Towards Paradise stands as one of the season’s most fascinating and original musical journeys. The audience sensed as much, rewarding Hardenberger with a fervent ovation." Verena Fischer-Zernin (Hamburger Abendblatt): "The applause only breaks out after a delay." ("Erst mit Verzögerung bricht der Applaus los.") and "There is no better way for an audience to express their gratitude." ("Schöner kann ein Publikum seine Dankbarkeit nicht ausdrücken."). Martin Blaumeiser from The New Listener wrote: "One of Widmann's best works".

== Films ==
- Preuße, Holger (28 May 2023), Im Labyrinth – Der Musiker Jörg Widmann – Die ganze Doku [In the Maze – The Musician Jörg Widmann] (in German), Arte, "Aired: 18 June 2023, 23:50" Deutscher Kamerapreis (German Camera Prize) 2023

The film Im Labyrinth – Der Musiker Jörg Widmann accompanies the composer during the writing of the trumpet concerto from the first drafts to the world premiere.
