= Jörg Widmann =

German composer, conductor and clarinetist (born 1973)

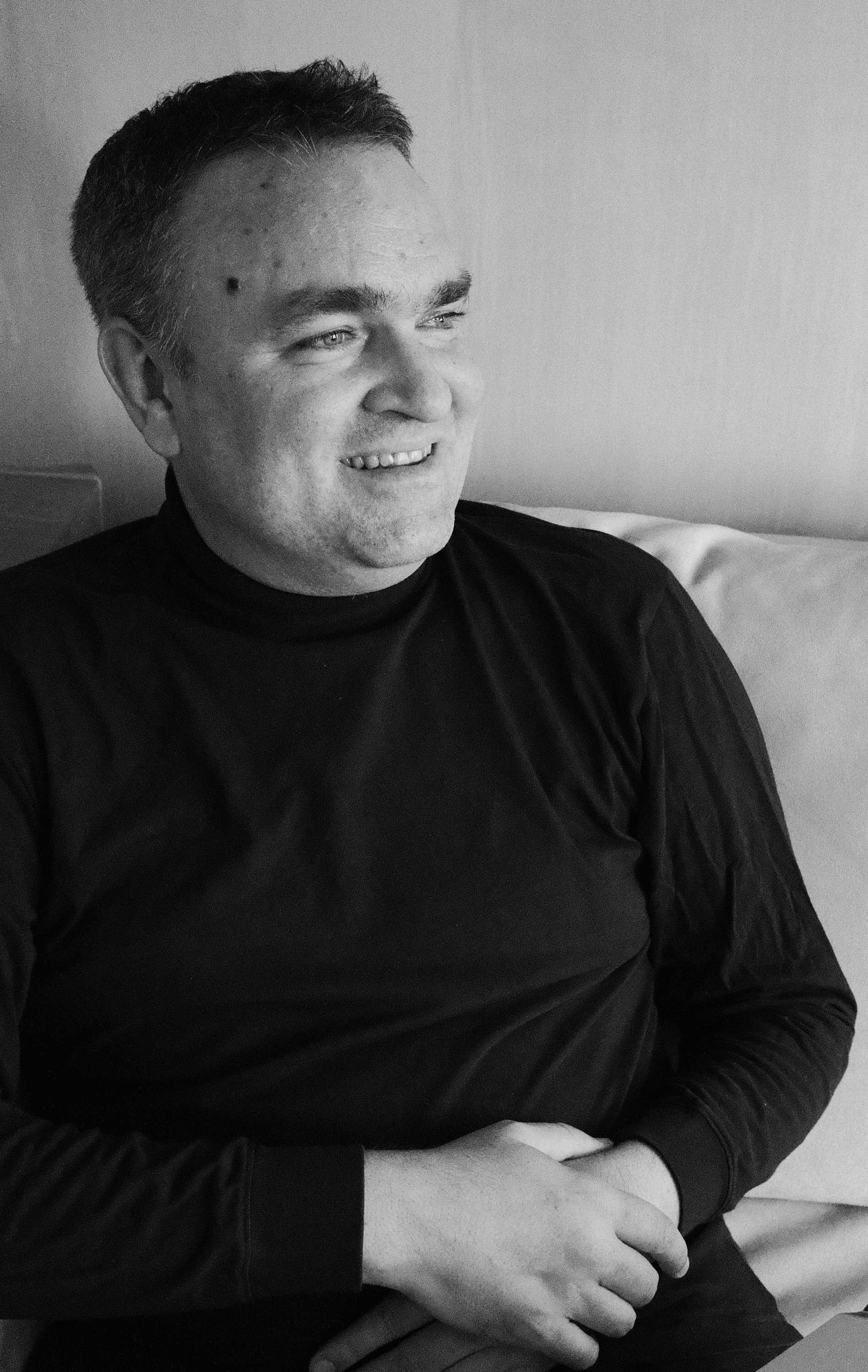
- Widmann in 2025
- Born: 19 June 1973 (age 53); Munich, West Germany
- Education: Hochschule für Musik und Theater München; Juilliard School; Hochschule für Musik Karlsruhe
- Occupations: clarinetist; composer; conductor; academic teacher
- Years active: 1990–present
- Era: Contemporary
- Organizations: Hochschule für Musik Freiburg; Barenboim–Said Akademie
- Notable work: Con brio; Babylon; Arche; Viola Concerto; Friedenkantate; Towards Paradise
- Family: Carolin Widmann (sister)
- Awards: Hindemith Prize; Schneider-Schott Music Prize; Ernst von Siemens Composer Prize; Arnold Schönberg Prize; Stoeger Prize; Robert Schumann Prize for Poetry and Music; Bach Prize of the Free and Hanseatic City of Hamburg; Leipzig International Mendelssohn Prize
- Website: www.joergwidmann.com

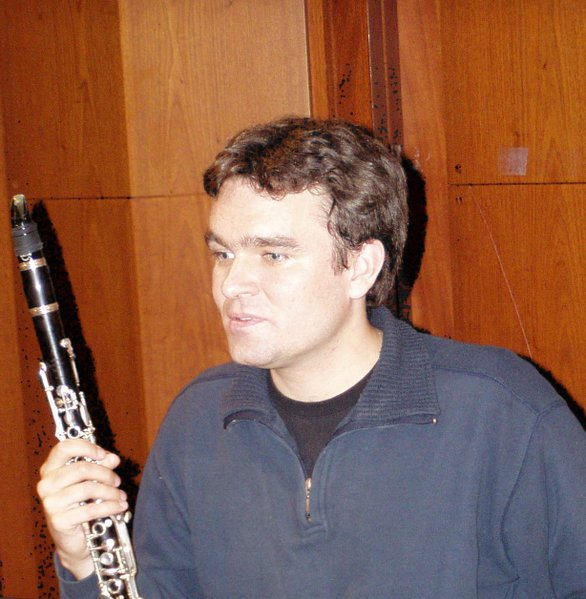
Widmann in 2006

Jörg Widmann (German: [ˈjœʁk ˈviːtman]; born 19 June 1973) is a German composer, conductor and clarinetist. In 2023, Widmann was the third most performed living contemporary composer in the world. Formerly a clarinet and composition professor at the University of Music Freiburg, he holds a composition professorship at the Barenboim–Said Akademie Berlin. His most important compositions are the concert overture Con brio, the opera Babylon, an oratorio Arche, Viola Concerto, Friedenskantate and the trumpet concerto Towards Paradise. Widmann has written musical tributes to Classical and Romantic composers. He was awarded the Bavarian Maximilian Order for Science and Art in 2018 and the Bach Prize of the Free and Hanseatic City of Hamburg in 2023. He was Gewandhaus composer of the Gewandhaus Orchester Leipzig and composer in residence for the Berlin Philharmonic.

== Early life and education ==
Widmann was born on 19 June 1973 in Munich, the son of a physicist and a teacher. His sister is the German classical violinist Carolin Widmann. He first took clarinet lessons in 1980. Four years later he became a composition student of Kay Westermann. Widmann attended the secondary school Pestalozzi Gymnasium in Munich. (Note: Where Hans Werner Henze commissioned Widmann's Schuloper Absences.) He later studied composition with Hans Werner Henze, Wilfried Hiller in Munich and Heiner Goebbels, Wolfgang Rihm in Karlsruhe.

He studied as a clarinetist at the Hochschule für Musik und Theater München with Gerhard Starke (1986–1997, Meisterklassendiplom 1997) and at the Juilliard School in New York City with Charles Neidich (1994–1995, Advanced Certificate 1995). He furthered his studies at the Hochschule für Musik Karlsruhe (1997–1999).

== Career ==
=== Academic teacher ===
From 2001 to 2015, Widmann taught clarinet as a professor at the University of Music Freiburg. From 2009 to 2015, Widmann was a part-time Professor of Composition, succeeding Mathias Spahlinger, at the Institute for New Music at the University of Music Freiburg. Since 2017, Widmann holds the Edward Said Chair in Composition at the Barenboim–Said Akademie, Berlin.

=== Clarinetist ===
As a soloist, Widmann has performed with major orchestras in Germany and abroad, including the Vienna Philharmonic Orchestra and Munich Philharmonic Orchestra, under conductors like Valery Gergiev, Christoph von Dohnányi, Sylvain Cambreling and Kent Nagano.

He has premiered several clarinet concerti dedicated to him: in 1999 through "musica viva", he played Music for Clarinet and Orchestra by Wolfgang Rihm; in 2006 with the WDR Symphony Orchestra, Cantus by Aribert Reimann; and in 2015 "über" by Mark Andre at the Donaueschingen Festival. He premiered Olga Neuwirth's Zones of Blue, a rhapsody for clarinet and orchestra, in 2026 in Munich with Simon Rattle and Bavarian Radio Symphony Orchestra.

Widmann's core repertoire as clarinetist includes Mozart's Clarinet Concerto and Clarinet Quintet, Weber's Clarinet Concerto No. 1 and Clarinet Quintet, Brahms's Clarinet Quintet, and Pierre Boulez's Dialogue de l'ombre double, which he performed on Boulez's 85th birthday in Paris. His chamber music partners include Daniel Barenboim, Tabea Zimmermann, András Schiff, Kim Kashkashian, Hélène Grimaud, Denis Kozhukhin and Mitsuko Uchida.

Widmann mostly plays a Herbert Wurlitzer clarinet from his student time.

=== Composer ===
==== Freiburg and Munich (2001–2016) ====
Compositions

Widmann's compositions draw on different musical genres. For example, he has written a trilogy for orchestra examining the projection of vocal forms of instrumental ensembles. The trilogy consists of Lied (premiered in 2003 and recorded on CD by the Bamberg Symphony with Jonathan Nott), Chor (premiered in 2004 by the Deutsches Symphonie-Orchester Berlin with Kent Nagano) and Messe (premiered in June 2005 by the Munich Philharmonic under Christian Thielemann). In 2008, the Siemens Arts Program sent Widmann to Dubai, where he completed Dubairische Tänze. (Note: "into... Dubai" was a music project by the Ensemble Modern, the Siemens Arts Program and the Goethe Institute.) This composition has influences from Bavarian folk dance. Widmann's Free Pieces for Ensemble: Number X is used in Sophie Fiennes's documentary Over Your Cities Grass Will Grow (2010), about the postwar German artist Anselm Kiefer. In 2012, he collaborated with philosopher Peter Sloterdijk, who was the librettist for his second opera Babylon. The theatrical Viola Concerto (2015) marked a new period in Widmann's œuvre. Soloist at the premiere and the following performances was Antoine Tamestit.

String quartets 1–5

Widmann's early string quartets are of particular note among his chamber music: the First Quartet was written in 1997, followed by the Chorale Quartet and the Hunting Quartet, the latter premiered in 2003 by the Arditti Quartet. 2005 saw the first performances of the Fourth Quartet and Experiment on a Fugue (Fifth Quartet, with soprano), with Juliane Banse and the Artemis Quartet. These five one-movement quartets form a cycle.

Premieres

In 2007, Pierre Boulez and the Vienna Philharmonic premiered his orchestral work Armonica for glass harmonica and orchestra. Widmann composed the music to the music theatre Am Anfang, where Anselm Kiefer was involved with a prologue and the stage design. The premiere took place in July 2009 as part of the 20th anniversary of the Opéra Bastille, in which Widmann acted as clarinetist and made his debut as conductor. The production was Gérard Mortier's farewell as general director of the Opéra National de Paris. Jörg Widmann's sister Carolin Widmann premiered his études IV-VI for violin (2004–2010) at the Wittener Tage für neue Kammermusik on 23 April 2010.

Performances

Widmann performed his Fantasie for Solo Clarinet (1993), one of his early compositions, to celebrate Walter Fink's 80th birthday at the Rheingau Musik Festival on 16 August 2010 and in 2014 was the festival's composer and artist in residence.

Composer in residence

Widmann was Composer in Residence at the Salzburg Festival and at the chamber music festival Spannungen, Heimbach in 2004. Octet was premiered on 4 June 2004 at the power plant Kraftwerk Heimbach. He was Composer in Residence at the Lucerne Festival in 2009, where on 13 August 2009, Heinz Holliger performed Widmann's oboe concerto, commissioned by the festival. On 5 September Widmann premiered Holliger's Rechant for solo clarinet. Widmann was the Tonhalle-Orchester Zürich's Creative Chair in the 2015–16 season.

==== Berlin and Munich (Since 2017) ====
Premieres

Widmann's oratorio ARCHE had its world premiere on 13 January 2017 on the occasion of the opening festivities of the Elbphilharmonie in Hamburg. It was performed by the Hamburg Philharmonic State Orchestra under Kent Nagano. Commissions from the Boston Symphony Orchestra and the Leipzig Gewandhaus Orchestra are Partita and the lyrical trumpet concerto Towards Paradise. Latter was premiered on 23 September 2021 at Gewandhaus with Håkan Hardenberger playing trumpet and Andris Nelsons conducting the Leipzig Gewandhaus Orchestra. This work refers to Miles Davis. On 8 June 2023, Friedenskantate for soli, choir, organ and orchestra was premiered by Andreas Reize conducting Leipzig Gewandhaus Orchestra and Thomanerchor in Leipzig, Thomaskirche, on the occasion of the 300th anniversary of Johann Sebastian Bach taking office as Thomaskantor. 2026 saw the premiere of Widmann's Jupiter-Etude played by violinist Tianwa Yang at Mozart Festival Würzburg. The piece is a homage to Mozart's Jupiter Symphony.

Performances

A concert with Widmann, Daniel Barenboim, and Anna Prohaska opened the Pierre Boulez Saal in Berlin on 4 March 2017.

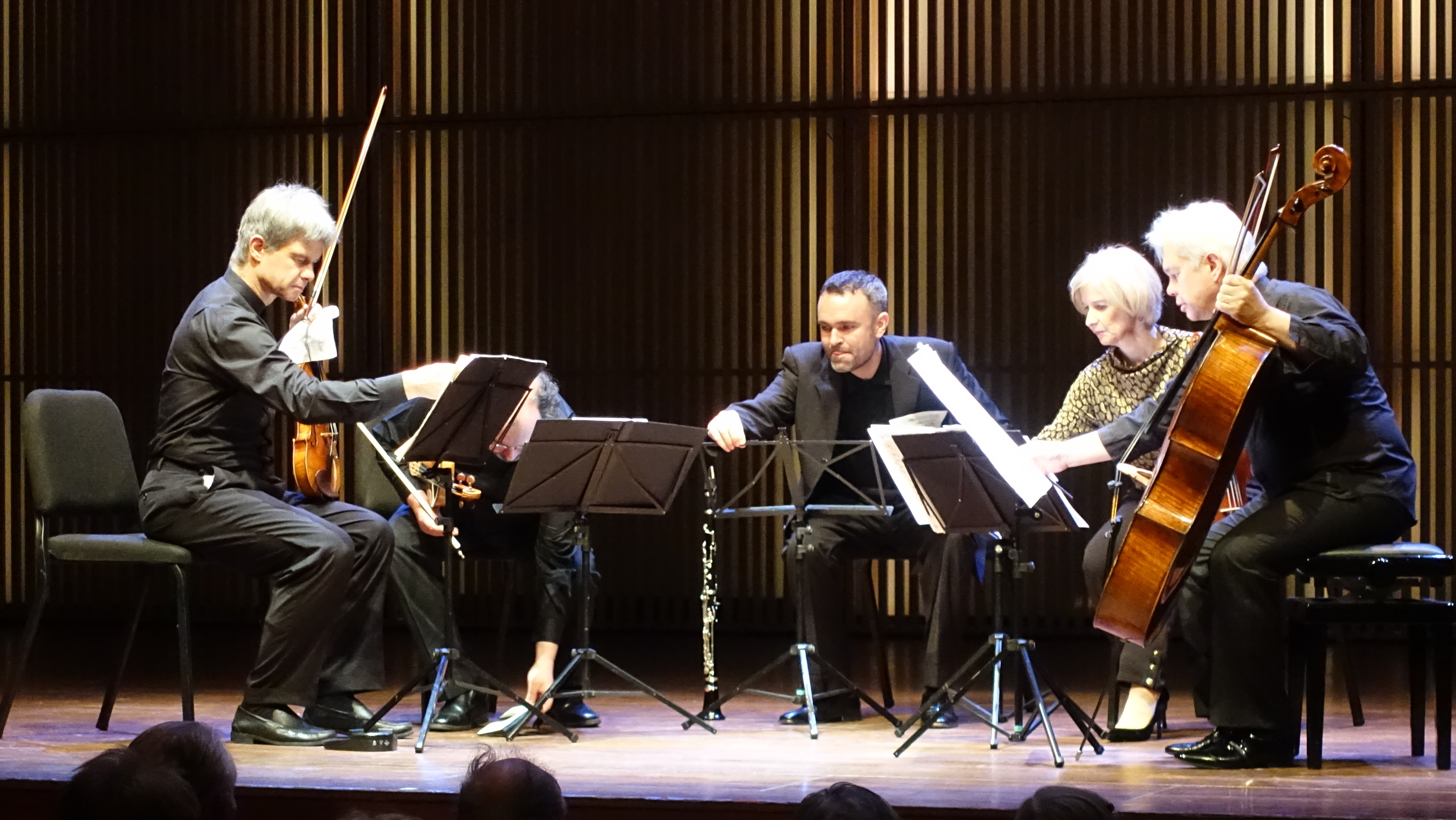
Hagen Quartet in Muziekgebouw aan 't IJ with clarinetist Jörg Widmann on 27 January 2018

On 27 January 2018, Widmann and the Hagen Quartet performed his Clarinet Quintet, as part of a European tour, at Amsterdam's Muziekgebouw aan het IJ. After the world premiere in 2012 at the Bavarian State Opera, in 2019 a new Berlin version of his opera Babylon was performed at the Berlin State Opera on Unter den Linden under the musical direction of Christopher Ward. During the COVID-19 pandemic of 2020, he contributed to the online Festival of New Music with his composition empty space. Barenboim and Emanuel Pahud curated the festival in the empty Pierre Boulez Saal. Widmann's commitment for peace was manifested in the 2025 Ukraine performance of his Cantata in tempore belli for alto, narrator, choir, organ and orchestra. The performance took place in the National Opera of Ukraine, Kyiv.

String quartets 6–10

Anne-Sophie Mutter is the dedicatee of String Quartet No. 6 (Study on Beethoven, 2019). With this piece, Widmann began a new series of works in the genre for the Beethoven anniversary year 2020. The series comprises five quartets. The quartets 7–10 were premiered by the Artemis Quartet, the Juilliard String Quartet and the Ruysdael Quartet.

Composer in residence

On 9 September 2015, the Boston Symphony Orchestra and the Leipzig Gewandhaus Orchestra proclaimed they were commissioning a work from Widmann as part of a planned collaboration by the two organizations beginning in the fall of 2017. The Leipzig Gewandhaus Orchestra announced Widmann's appointment as its first-ever Gewandhauskomponist (Gewandhaus composer) for the 2017–18 season. Widmann held the 2019–20 Richard and Barbara Debs Composer's Chair at Carnegie Hall. In the 2023–24 season, Widmann was Berlin Philharmonic's composer in residence and made his debut conducting the orchestra. Widmann composed a concerto for the orchestra's principal horn Stefan Dohr. In the 2026–27 season he is "Capell-Compositeur" and "Capell-Virtuos" of the Staatskapelle Dresden.

=== Conductor ===
==== Freiburg and Munich (2001–2016) ====
In 2008, Widmann conducted a rehearsal of the premiere of his concert overture Con brio, followed by his debut with Am Anfang in 2009 in Paris. From 2012 to 2017, he was Principal Guest Conductor of the Irish Chamber Orchestra.

==== Berlin and Munich (Since 2017) ====
From 2017 to 2022, Widmann was Principal Conductor and Artistic Partner of the Irish Chamber Orchestra. Since 2022, he has been Associated Conductor of the Munich Chamber Orchestra. He was guest conductor of the Mozarteum Orchester Salzburg. From the 2023–24 season, Widmann has been principal guest conductor of the NDR Radiophilharmonie for three years. He conducted the Berlin Philharmonic in his function as composer in residence. In the 2025–2026 season, Widmann made his official conducting debut with the Cleveland Orchestra, Atlanta Symphony and the Detroit Symphony. Since 2026, Widmann has been the artistic director of the Lucerne Festival Academy, succeeding Wolfgang Rihm. He conducted the Lucerne Festival Contemporary Orchestra with Rihm's Tutuguri in Lucerne, Berlin and Munich. He will make his conducting debut with the Concertgebouw Orchestra in the 2026–2027 season.

== Other activities ==
Widmann is president of the International Max Reger Society. Widmann was the judge for the Toru Takemitsu Composition Award 2026.

== Personal life ==
Widmann lives and works in Berlin and Munich.

== Reception ==
According to Bachtrack, Widmann was in 2023 the third most performed living contemporary composer in the world, behind John Williams and Arvo Pärt; in 2024, he ranked sixth. (Note: 2018: 3rd place, 2022: 6th place,)

== Compositional style ==
Widmann cannot be pinned down to a specific personal style or composition school. His music has been described as varied and imaginative. In his experimental and technically demanding early work, Widmann integrates serialism and noise into traditional forms/structures. He focuses on sounds, not tones. Widmann has written pieces without pitches and also purely tonal pieces with exaggerated familiar gestures. In many of his compositions, Widmann is in a musical "dialogue" with Classical and Romantic composers such as Mozart, Beethoven, Schumann, Mendelssohn, Schubert and Brahms. He wrote musical tributes to these composers.

Widmann's scores show extremely precise, well-considered structures and instructions. A common instruction is that the soloist moves around the stage, for example in Viola Concerto, Towards Paradise and Friedenskantate. Widmann integrates the soloist of his concertos into the creative process. He uses extended techniques in many compositions, such as Con brio. Besides the influence of his musical idols, Widmann finds inspiration in literature, poems, paintings and sculptures. He frequently uses literary sources for his compositions, like Matthias Claudius, Klabund, Heinrich Heine, Peter Sloterdijk, Clemens Brentano and Friedrich Schiller in his oratorio ARCHE. In his 2023 Bach-homage Friedenskantate (peace cantata), he uses texts by Matthias Claudius, Jean Paul, Bertolt Brecht, Dietrich Bonhoeffer, Paul Gerhardt and from the Bible. In Cantata in tempore belli, composed in 2024, Widmann uses the pacifistic text "Sag Nein!" (Say no) by Wolfgang Borchert to express his call for peace.

== Awards ==
- 1985, 1987 Jugend musiziert
- 1996 Förderpreis Musik der Landeshauptstadt München
- 1997 Bayerischer Staatspreis für junge Künstler
- 1999 Belmont Prize for Contemporary Music from the Forberg-Schneider Foundation
- 2001 Louis Spohr Medal of the City of Seesen
- 2002 Hindemith Prize of the Schleswig-Holstein Musik Festival
- 2002 Schneider-Schott Music Prize
- 2003 Ernst von Siemens Composer Prize
- 2003–2004: Awarded by Opernwelt magazine for 'most important premiere of the season' for Das Gesicht im Spiegel.
- 2004 Arnold Schönberg Prize
- 2006 Composition prize of the SWR Sinfonieorchester Baden-Baden und Freiburg for Second Labyrinth
- 2006 Claudio-Abbado-Kompositionspreis of the Orchester-Akademie of the Berlin Philharmonic for Quintet for oboe, clarinet, horn, bassoon and piano
- 2007 Prize of the Christoph and Stephan Kaske Foundation
- 2009 Stoeger Prize of the New York Chamber Music Society
- 2010 Marsilius Medal of the Heidelberg University
- 2013 Heidelberger Frühling Music Award
- 2013 German Music Authors' Prize (Composition Symphonic)
- 2018 Robert Schumann Prize for Poetry and Music
- 2018 Bavarian Maximilian Order for Science and Art
- 2019 Opus Klassik, "Composer of the year" for ARCHE
- 2021 Musikpreis der Landeshauptstadt München
- 2021 Würth Prize of Jeunesses Musicales Germany
- 2023 Bach Prize of the Free and Hanseatic City of Hamburg
- 2026 Leipzig International Mendelssohn Prize

=== Honorary degrees ===
- 2023 Honorary doctorate University of Limerick

== Memberships ==
- 2003 Fellow of the Berlin Institute for Advanced Study
- 2005 Member of the Bayerische Akademie der Schönen Künste
- 2007 Member of the Freie Akademie der Künste Hamburg
- 2007 Member of the Deutsche Akademie der Darstellenden Künste
- 2016 Member of the Akademie der Wissenschaften und der Literatur Mainz
- 2024 Member of the Royal Swedish Academy of Music

== Works ==
=== Music ===
- Das Gesicht im Spiegel (2003)
- Babylon (2012)
- Arche (2016)
- Friedenskantate (2023)
- Con brio (2008)
- Partita (2018)
- Viola Concerto (2015)
- Violin Concerto No. 2 (2018)
- Towards Paradise (Labyrinth VI) (2021, trumpet concerto)
- Horn Concerto (2023–24)
- Clarinet Quintet (2017)
- Fantasie for Solo Clarinet (1993)

As of 2024, Widmann has composed a series of seven Labyrinth pieces.

=== Writings ===
- Widmann, Jörg (2019). "Utopian Music? The Exception as the Quintessence". Beethoven 250. Unter der Oberfläche / Beneath the Surface. Essays zum Beethovenjahr / Essays for the Beethoven Year. Berlin: Pierre Boulez-Saal.
- —— (14 April 2014). "Musikpreis des "Heidelberger Frühlings": Man muss das Feuer einfach weitergeben". Frankfurter Allgemeine Zeitung (in German).
- —— (2010), Tradition und Innovation in der Musik, doi:10.11588/HEIDOK.00011076

== Films ==
- Widmann, Jörg; Kiefer, Anselm; Missler-Morell, Andreas (2009), ... und es wird Klang – der Komponist Jörg Widmann (in German), [Erscheinungsort nicht ermittelbar]: ZDF, OCLC 916866277
- Faltin, Sigrid; Mutter, Anne-Sophie; SWR Classic (Firm); SWR Media GmbH (2023), Anne-Sophie Mutter – Vivace (in German), [Deutschland]: SWR Classic, OCLC 1390093297
- Preuße, Holger (28 May 2023), Im Labyrinth – Der Musiker Jörg Widmann – Die ganze Doku [In the Maze – The Musician Jörg Widmann] (in German), Arte, "Aired: 18 June 2023, 23:50" Video English translation on YouTube, Deutscher Kamerapreis (German Camera Prize) 2023

== Notes ==
Cultural offices
Preceded by (no predecessor)	Principal conductor, Irish Chamber Orchestra; 2017–2022	Succeeded by Thomas Zehetmair
