= Dohr (surname) =

Dohr is a German habitational surname for someone who lived by the gates of a town or city. Notable people with the surname include:

- Christoph Dohr (born 1964), German musicologist
- Stefan Dohr (born 1965), German horn player
