= Traubel (surname) =

Traubel is a surname. Notable people with the surname include:

- Helen Traubel (1899–1972), American opera and concert singer
- Horace Traubel (1858–1919), American poet
- Sarah Traubel (born 1986), German opera singer
