= Felzer =

Felzer is a surname. Notable people with the surname include:

- Karen Felzer, American seismologist
- Oleg Felzer (1939–1998), Azerbaijani and Soviet composer and teacher
