= Stoeger Prize =

- Awarded for: "significant contributions to the field of chamber music composition."
- Sponsored by: Milan Stoeger
- Location: New York City
- Country: United States
- Reward: US$25,000
- First award: 1987
- Website: www.chambermusicsociety.org/about/commissioning/stoeger-prize/

The Stoeger Prize from the Chamber Music Society of Lincoln Center is an international music prize for composers of chamber music. The US$25,000 cash award is given every two years in recognition of significant contributions to the chamber music repertory. The money was donated by Milan Stoeger, a psychoanalyst and a long-time subscriber to the Chamber Music Society, in honor of his wife. The Elise L. Stoeger Prize was established in 1987.

== Winners ==
- 1987 Gunther Schuller
- 1990 Oliver Knussen
- 1992 Lee Hyla and Olly Wilson
- 1993 Aaron Jay Kernis and Nicholas Maw
- 1994 Oleg Felzer and Richard Wilson
- 1995 David Liptak and Steven Mackey
- 1996 Martin Bresnick and Osvaldo Golijov
- 1997 Stephen Hartke and Judith Weir
- 1998 Thomas Adès and Yehudi Wyner
- 1999 James Primosch and Scott Wheeler
- 2000 Michael Daugherty and Kaija Saariaho
- 2002 Chen Yi
- 2004 David Rakowski
- 2006 Pierre Jalbert
- 2008 Jörg Widmann
- 2010 Brett Dean
- 2012 Zhou Long
- 2014 Thomas Larcher
- 2016 Huw Watkins
- 2018 Marc-André Dalbavie
- 2020 David Serkin Ludwig
- 2022 Chris Rogerson
- 2024 Timo Andres
