= Horn Concerto (Widmann) =

2024 composition by Jörg Widmann

- by Jörg Widmann
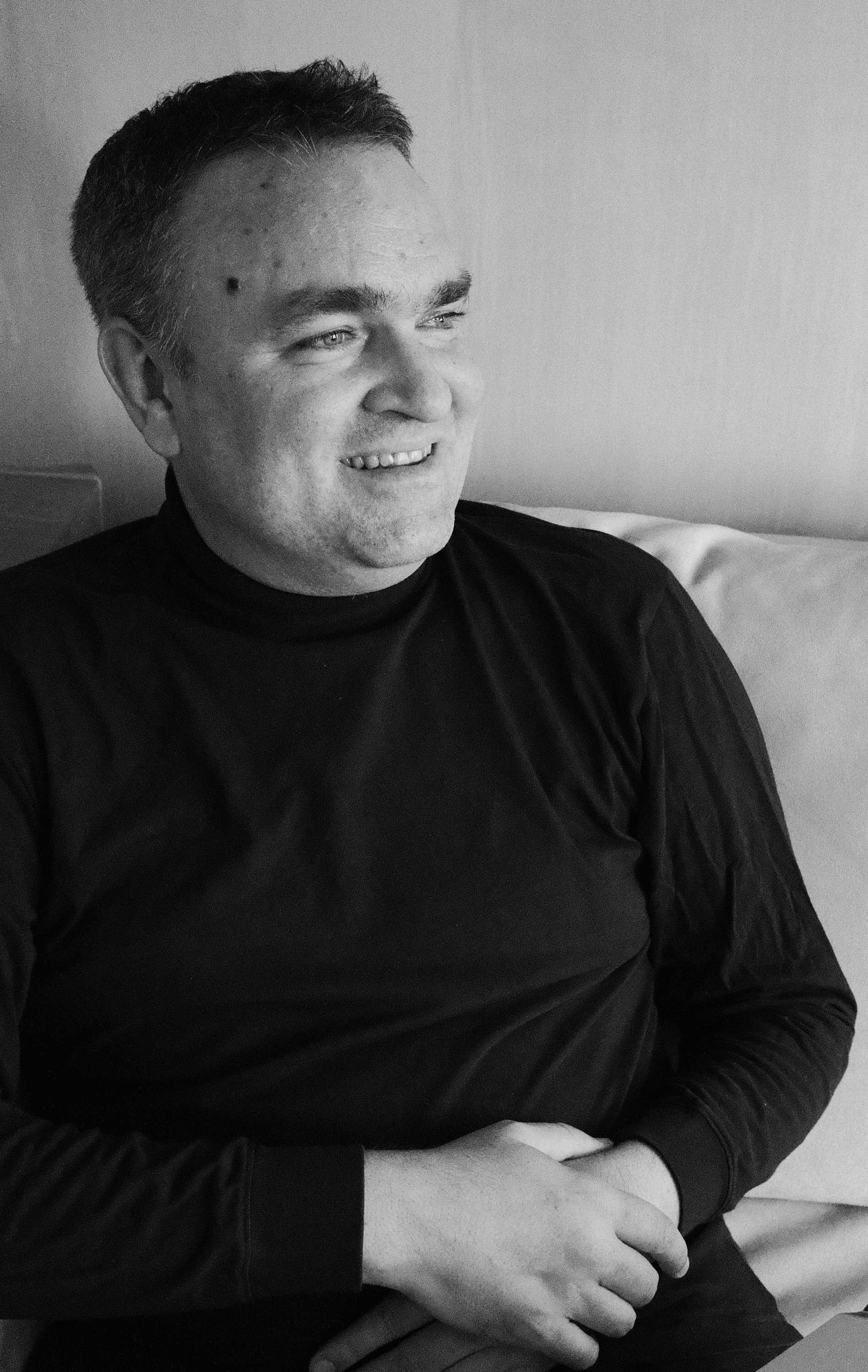
- The composer in 2025
- Period: Contemporary
- Genre: Concerto
- Commissioned by: Berlin Philharmonic; Tokyo Metropolitan Symphony Orchestra; Swedish Radio Symphony Orchestra; Stavanger Symphony Orchestra; Brussels Philharmonic; Lucerne Symphony Orchestra
- Composed: 2023–24
- Published: 2024: Mainz
- Publisher: Schott Music
- Duration: 38:00
- Movements: 7

Premiere
- Date: 30 May 2024
- Location: Berliner Philharmonie
- Conductor: Simon Rattle
- Performers: Stefan Dohr; Berlin Philharmonic

Jörg Widmann's Horn Concerto was composed in 2023–24 and premiered on 30 May 2024 with soloist Stefan Dohr and the Berlin Philharmonic under the direction of Simon Rattle at Berliner Philharmonie. The work has enigmatic as well as humorous elements.

== History ==
In the 2023–24 season, Widmann was Berlin Philharmonic's Composer in Residence and made his debut conducting the orchestra. Widmann composed a concerto during the residency for the orchestras principal horn and dedicatee Stefan Dohr. The composer and the soloist had met with sketch material about ten times. With the premiere of this work Widmann's residency with the Berlin Philharmonic Orchestra came to an end.

The horn concerto has been commissioned by the Berlin Philharmonic, Tokyo Metropolitan Symphony Orchestra, Swedish Radio Symphony Orchestra, Stavanger Symphony Orchestra, Brussels Philharmonic and Lucerne Symphony Orchestra.

== Structure ==
The 7-movement horn concerto last 38 minutes. The number seven has been already used by Widmann in the opera Babylon and appears commonly in Mesopotamian tradition and theology. The movement titles are evokative.

1. Traumbild (Reverie)
2. Andantino grazioso
3. Scherzo à la surprise
4. Adagietto
5. Zwischenwelt (Intermediate World)
6. Vorahnung (Premonition)
7. Finale

Widmann characterized the first movement Traumbild (Reverie) with "Let there be sound". The second movement Andantino grazioso is based on a theme of Carl Maria von Weber's Horn Concertino. Further citations in Scherzo à la surprise are Rossini, Johann Strauss I and Offenbach. The centrepiece Adagietto is reminiscent to Mahler. The enigmatic Vorahnung (Premonition) lays false trails and the Finale summarizes the thematic material of the preceding movements. The work with humorous elements uses extended techniques.

== Orchestration ==
- Woodwinds: 3 Flutes (2nd doubling piccolo), 3 Oboes (3rd doubling cor anglais and cuckoo whistle), 2 Clarinets in B♭ und A (2nd doubling E♭ clarinet), Bass clarinet, 2 Bassoons, Double bassoon
- Brass: 4 Horns in F, 3 Trumpets in C, 2 Trombone, Bass trombone, Tuba
- Timpani
- Percussion (3 players): I Glockenspiel, Crotales, Xylophone, Tubular bells, Triangle, Splash cymbal, Cymbal (medium), 3 Tam-tams (high/medium/low), 2 High Brazilian tamborims, Snare drum, 3 Tom-toms (high/medium/low), Castanets, Flexaton, Vibraslap, Clay bird whistle. II Tubular bells, Triangle, Pair of cymbals, Splash cymbal, 3 Cymbals (high/medium/low), Sizzle cymbal, 3 Tam-tams (high/medium/low), Tamburin with jingles, Bass drum (with cymbals), Friction drum (small), Metal chimes, Maracas, Claves, 3 Wood blocks, Whistle, Whip, Flexatone, Car horns (tuned), Rainmaker (ossia: ocean drum). III Vibraphone, Triangle, Pair of cymbals, Splash cymbal, 3 Cymbals (high/medium/low), Chinese cymbal, Sizzle cymbal, 2 Tam-tams (medium/low), Thai gongs, Guiro, Ratchet, Castanets, 3 Wood blocks (on top of each other), 5 Temple blocks, Whip, Whistle, Flexatone, Vibraslap, Swanee whistle (high), Waterphone, Thunder sheet
- Strings: 12 Violins I, 10 Violins II, 8 Violas, 6 Violoncellos, 6 Double basses (all 5 strings with B as the lowest string)
- Harp (the lowest strings are tuned to C and D), Celesta

== Premiere ==
The work premiered on 30 May 2024 in Berliner Philharmonie with Simon Rattle conducting the Berlin Philharmonic and the soloist Stefan Dohr (further performances on 31 May and 1 June).

== Reception ==
Wolfram Quellmalz from Neue (musikalische) Blätter wrote: "A little bit of circus" and "the audience had fun and applauded enthusiastically". Elena Luporini from Bachtrack wrote: "The score brims with different materials, tracing not just a history of horn-playing, but a present and possibly a future."
