= Fantasie (Widmann) =

1993 solo clarinet work by Jörg Widmann

- by Jörg Widmann
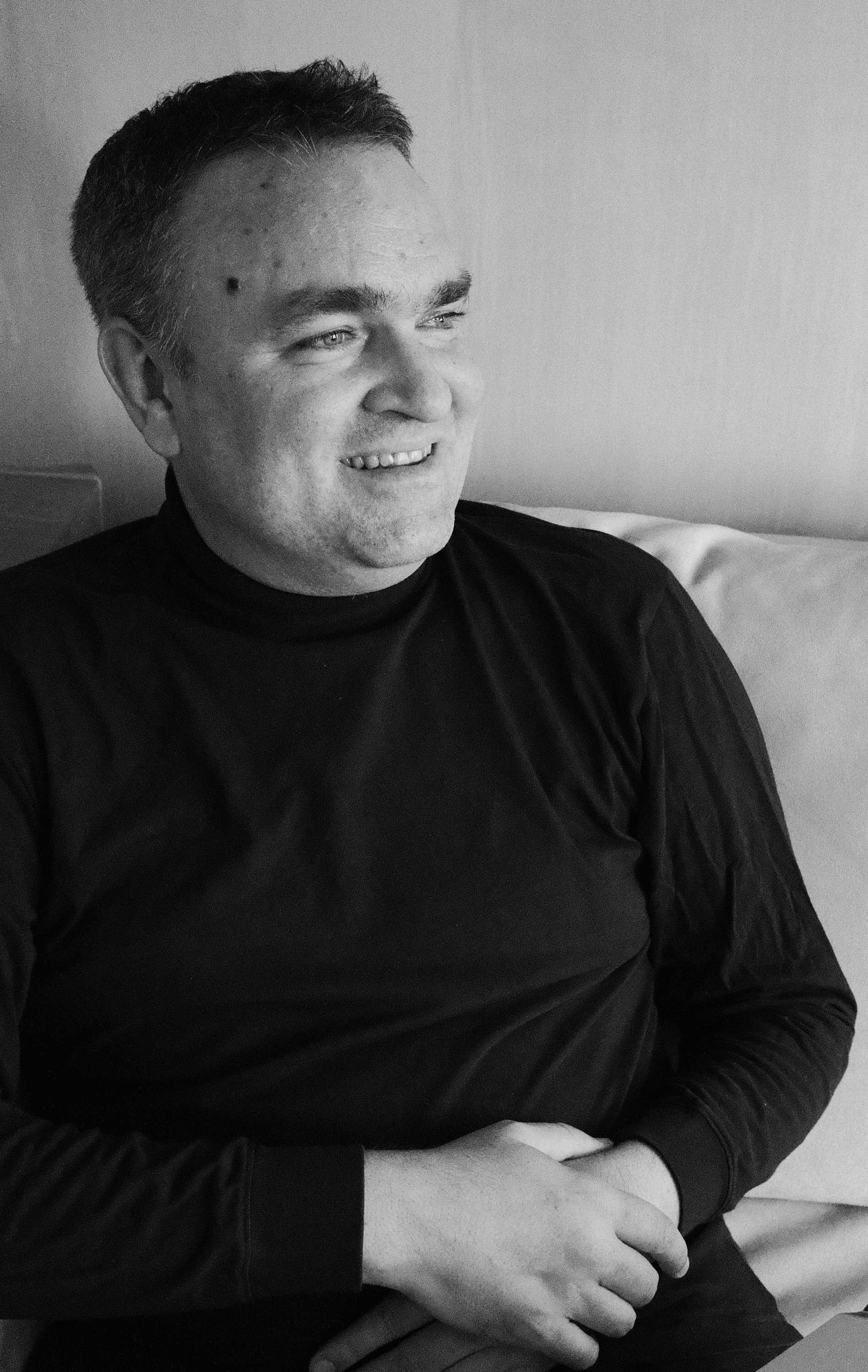
- The composer in 2025
- Period: Contemporary
- Composed: 1993
- Published: 2005: Mainz
- Publisher: Schott Music
- Duration: 7:00
- Scoring: clarinet in B♭

Premiere
- Date: 1 March 1994
- Location: Bayerischer Rundfunk, Munich
- Performers: Jörg Widmann

Fantasie for Solo Clarinet is a solo instrumental work by Jörg Widmann and was composed in 1993. It has a "Harlequin spirit".

== History ==
Stravinsky's Three Pieces for Solo Clarinet and Boulez's Dialogue de l'ombre double were used as the basis. Fantasie was an early composition of Widmann, he was 20 years old. The piece was premiered by the composer on 1 March 1994 at Bayerischer Rundfunk in Munich.

== Music ==
Fantasie opens with a multiphonic as a parody of new music; Widmann uses frequently extended techniques. The work has elements of dance, klezmer and jazz music and is an expression of "virtuoso flourishes and youthful exuberance". The piece is influenced by the commedia dell'arte. The composer cites The Rite of Spring in Fantasie.

== Structure ==
Sections:

1. Free, rhapsodically
2. Fast, brilliant
3. Presto possible
4. Tempo come prima, ma poco più mosso

== Reception ==
Zachary Woolfe from The New York Times wrote: "...sounding like the most beautiful circus music ever written."

== Recordings ==
- Bettina Aust and Robert Aust, Bettina Aust – Deutscher Musikwettbewerb, Laureate 2015, Clarinet, Recorded at Ehemalige Sendestelle des Deutschlandradios, 16–19 October 2015, GENUIN classics, GEN 16432, 2016, compact disc. OCLC 987272763
- Eduard Brunner, Music for Solo Clarinet, Recorded in Studio 2, Bayerischer Rundfunk, Munich, 14–15 December 2009, Naxos, 8.572470, 2011, compact disc. OCLC 1080882095
- Stefan Neubauer, Solitary Changes, Recorded between 2012 and 2013, Orlando Records, or 0006, 2013. OCLC 887469607
- Tanaka, Kaori; Nakachi, Tomoko; Delmas, Marc; Gaubert, Philippe; Mazellier, Jules; Nielsen, Carl; Marty, Georges; Widmann, Jörg; Revel, Pierre; Semler-Collery, Jules (2023), Fantasie (in no linguistic content), MClassics, OCLC 1396745448
- Widmann, Jörg; Mendelssohn-Bartholdy, Felix; Irish Chamber Orchestra (2018), 180 beats per minute; Fantasie (in no linguistic content), München: Orfeo Records, OCLC 1082260943
