= Friedenskantate (Widmann) =

Cantata by Jörg Widmann

- Cantata by Jörg Widmann
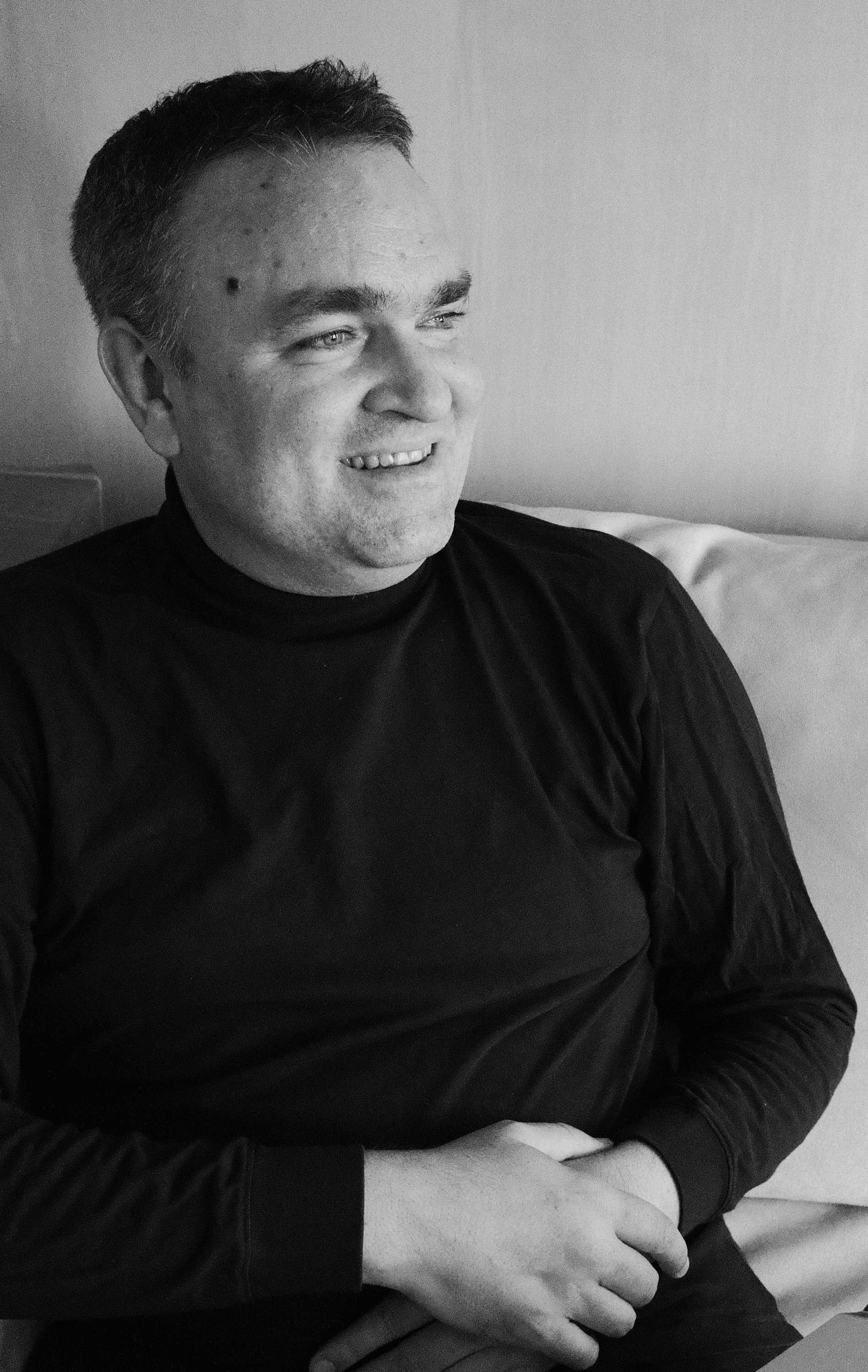
- The composer in 2025
- Period: Contemporary
- Occasion: Bach 300, BACH for Future
- Composed: 2023
- Published: 2023: Mainz
- Publisher: Schott Music
- Duration: 35:00
- Movements: 7

Premiere
- Date: 8 June 2023
- Location: Thomaskirche, Leipzig
- Conductor: Andreas Reize
- Performers: Leipzig Gewandhaus Orchestra; Thomanerchor

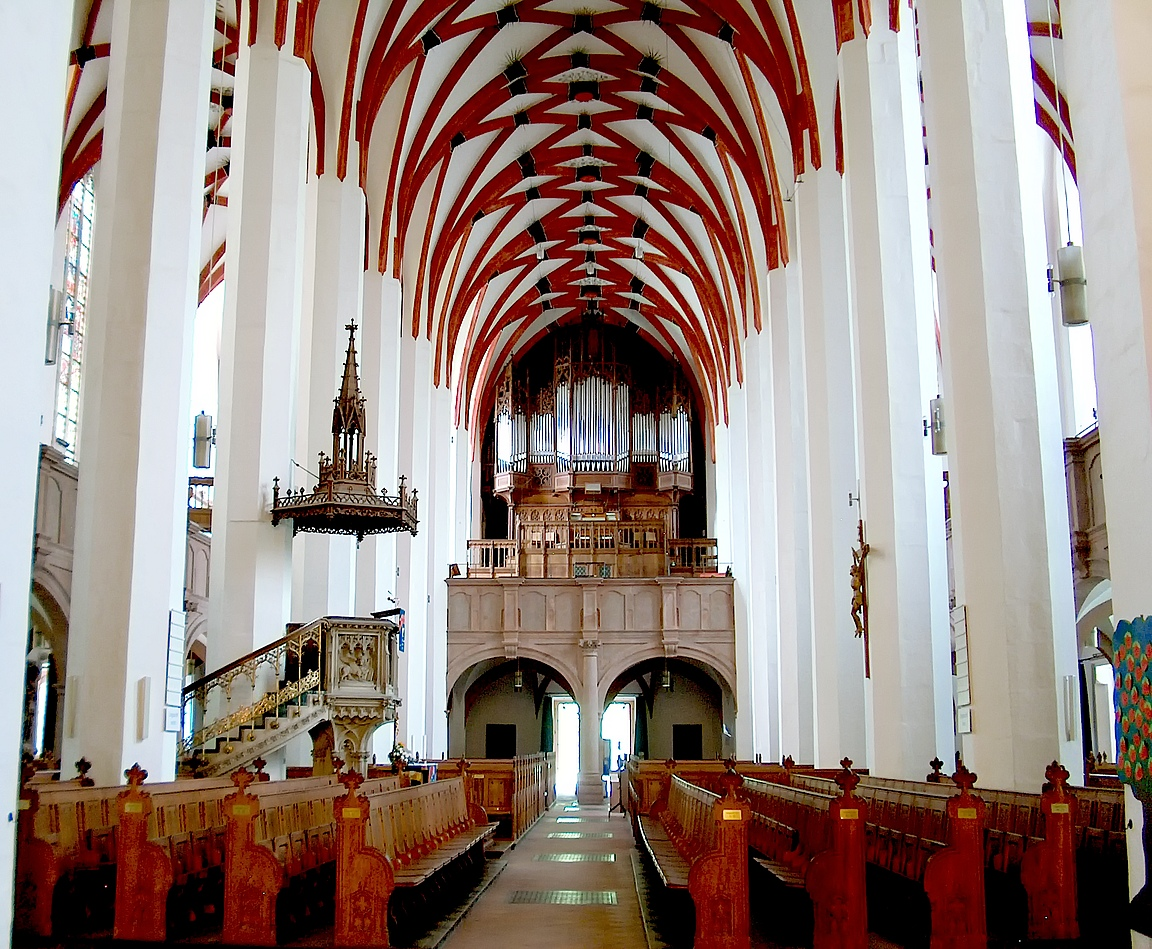
Thomaskirche Interior

Friedenskantate (Peace Cantata) for soli, choir, organ and orchestra is a work by German composer Jörg Widmann. It was composed in 2023, on the occasion of the 300th anniversary of Johann Sebastian Bach taking office as Thomaskantor in Leipzig. It was premiered on 8 June 2023 by Thomaskantor Andreas Reize conducting Gewandhausorchester Leipzig and Thomanerchor at Thomaskirche.

== History ==
In 1723, Johann Sebastian Bach was appointed Thomaskantor in Leipzig. His inaugural cantata was Die Elenden sollen essen, BWV 75. The cantata's theme is grave poverty, a serious problem of that time. Widmann took Bach's cantata and the Baroque form as starting point for his composition. The theme of the new composition is war, a contemporary subject. Friedenskantate was commissioned by the Bach Archive Leipzig financed by the Ernst von Siemens Music Foundation.

== Structure ==
Kantate is structured in seven parts.

1. Praeludium (instrumental)
2. 's ist Krieg! (It is war!) (Matthias Claudius)
3. Ist kein Gott? (Is no god?) (Jean Paul)
4. Choral: Lasst euch nicht verführen! (Don't be seduced!) (Bertold Brecht)
5. Glaube, Hoffnung, Liebe (Faith, Hope, Love) (Bible)
6. Von guten Mächten (Of good powers) (Dietrich Bonhoeffer)
7. Halleluja (Paul Gerhardt)

=== Praeludium ===
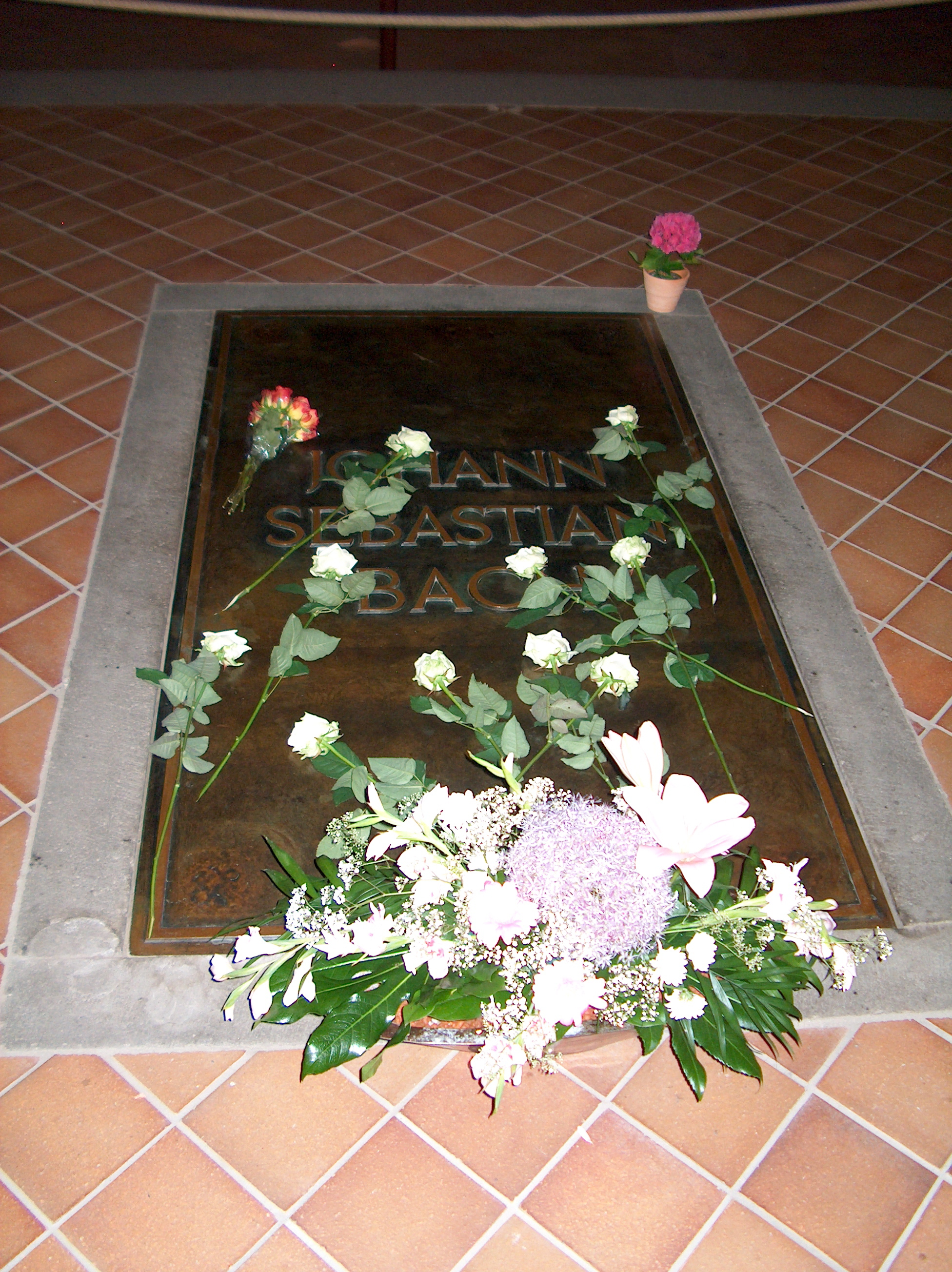
Bach's grave beneath the floor of the choir (sanctuary) of the church

A silent meditation for solo bass clarinet, the cantus is accompanied with tubular bells. The instruction for the bass clarinetist as homage to Bach is: Walk from sacristy to Bach's grave and then to the position in the orchestra while playing.

=== Matthias Claudius 's ist Krieg ===
It's war! Torn style interspersed with drum attacks and shrill dissonance.

==== Lyrics ====
Taken from: Kriegslied (Matthias Claudius)

's ist Krieg! 's ist Krieg! O Gottes Engel wehre,
Und rede Du darein!
's ist leider Krieg – und ich begehre,
Nicht schuld daran zu sein!

Was sollt ich machen, wenn im Schlaf mit Grämen
Und blutig, bleich und blaß,
Die Geister der Erschlagnen zu mir kämen,
Und vor mir weinten, was?

Wenn wackre Männer, die sich Ehre suchten,
Verstümmelt und halb tot
Im Staub sich vor mir wälzten und mir fluchten
In ihrer Todesnot?

Wenn tausend tausend Väter, Mütter, Bräute,
So glücklich vor dem Krieg,
Nun alle elend, alle arme Leute,
Wehklagten über mich?

Wenn Hunger, böse Seuch und ihre Nöten
Freund, Freund und Feind ins Grab
Versammelten, und mir zu Ehren krähten
Von einer Leich' herab?

Was hülf mir Kron' und Land und Gold und Ehre?
Die könnten mich nicht freun!
's ist leider Krieg – und ich begehre,
Nicht schuld daran zu sein!

[Final stanza of the first edition:]
Doch Friede schaffen, Fried' im Land' und Meere:
Das wäre Freude nun!
Ihr Fürsten, ach! wenn's irgend möglich wäre!!
Was könnt Ihr Größers thun?

=== Jean Paul Ist kein Gott? ===
Highly expressive setting.

=== Bertolt Brecht Gegen Verführung ===
A cappella chorale.

==== Lyrics ====
1. Laßt euch nicht verführen!
Es gibt keine Wiederkehr.
Der Tag steht in den Türen;
Ihr könnt schon Nachtwind spüren:
Es kommt kein Morgen mehr.

2. Laßt euch nicht betrügen!
Das Leben wenig ist.
Schlürft es in schnellen Zügen!
Es wird euch nicht genügen
Wenn ihr es lassen müßt!

3. Laßt euch nicht vertrösten!
Ihr habt nicht zu viel Zeit!
Laßt Moder den Erlösten!
Das Leben ist am größten:
Es steht nicht mehr bereit.

4. Laßt euch nicht verführen
Zu Fron und Ausgezehr!
Was kann euch Angst noch rühren?
Ihr sterbt mit allen Tieren
Und es kommt nichts nachher.

=== Dietrich Bonhoeffer Von guten Mächten ===
The emotional core of the cantata. The text was written shortly before his execution by the Nazis.

==== Lyrics ====
1. Von guten Mächten treu und still umgeben,
behütet und getröstet wunderbar,
so will ich diese Tage mit euch leben
und mit euch gehen in ein neues Jahr.

2. Noch will das alte unsre Herzen quälen,
noch drückt uns böser Tage schwere Last.
Ach Herr, gib unsern aufgeschreckten Seelen
das Heil, für das du uns geschaffen hast.

3. Und reichst du uns den schweren Kelch, den bittern
des Leids, gefüllt bis an den höchsten Rand,
so nehmen wir ihn dankbar ohne Zittern
aus deiner guten und geliebten Hand.

4. Doch willst du uns noch einmal Freude schenken
an dieser Welt und ihrer Sonne Glanz,
dann wolln wir des Vergangenen gedenken,
und dann gehört dir unser Leben ganz.

5. Laß warm und hell die Kerzen heute flammen,
die du in unsre Dunkelheit gebracht,
führ, wenn es sein kann, wieder uns zusammen.
Wir wissen es, dein Licht scheint in der Nacht.

6. Wenn sich die Stille nun tief um uns breitet,
so laß uns hören jenen vollen Klang
der Welt, die unsichtbar sich um uns weitet,
all deiner Kinder hohen Lobgesang.

7. Von guten Mächten wunderbar geborgen,
erwarten wir getrost, was kommen mag.
Gott ist bei uns am Abend und am Morgen
und ganz gewiß an jedem neuen Tag.

=== Halleluja ===
At the end bright D major, in Baroque music regarded as the "key of glory", with trumpet and horn cheering and a big peal.

== Instrumentation ==
Source score:

- Woodwinds: 2 flutes (2nd doubling piccolo), 2 oboes (2nd doubling cor anglais), 2 clarinets (2nd doubling bass clarinet and ad lib. contra bass clarinet), 2 bassoons (2nd doubling contra bassoon)
- Brass: 2 horns in F, 3 trumpets in C (1st doubling high B♭), 1 tenor trombone (doubling bass trombone)
- Strings: 6 violins I, 6 violins II, 4 violas, 3 cellos, 2 double basses (all with 5 strings with B as lowest string)
- Percussion: 2 players
- Organ

== Premiere ==
8 June 2023, Leipzig, Thomaskirche

- Pia Davila, soprano
- Geneviève Tschumi, alto
- Raphael Höhn, tenor
- Tobias Berndt, bass
- Johannes Lang, organ
- Volker Hemken, bass clarinet
- Andreas Reize, Gewandhausorchester Leipzig, Thomanerchor

== Reception ==
Anastassia Boutsko wrote at Deutsche Welle: "peace appeal" ("Friedensappell"). Michael Stallknecht from Neue Zürcher Zeitung criticized the final Halleluja of the "demanding" work as "dull" ("platt"), but catchpenny. An anonymous reviewer wrote about the premiere: "lush, exuberant musical universe" ("üppiges, überbordendes musikalisches Universum") and "impressive interpretation" ("eindrucksvolle Interpretation"). Some in the audience could not stand the disturbing and agitative character of the work and fled the Thomaskirche.
