= Viola Concerto (Widmann) =

2015 composition by Jörg Widmann

- by Jörg Widmann
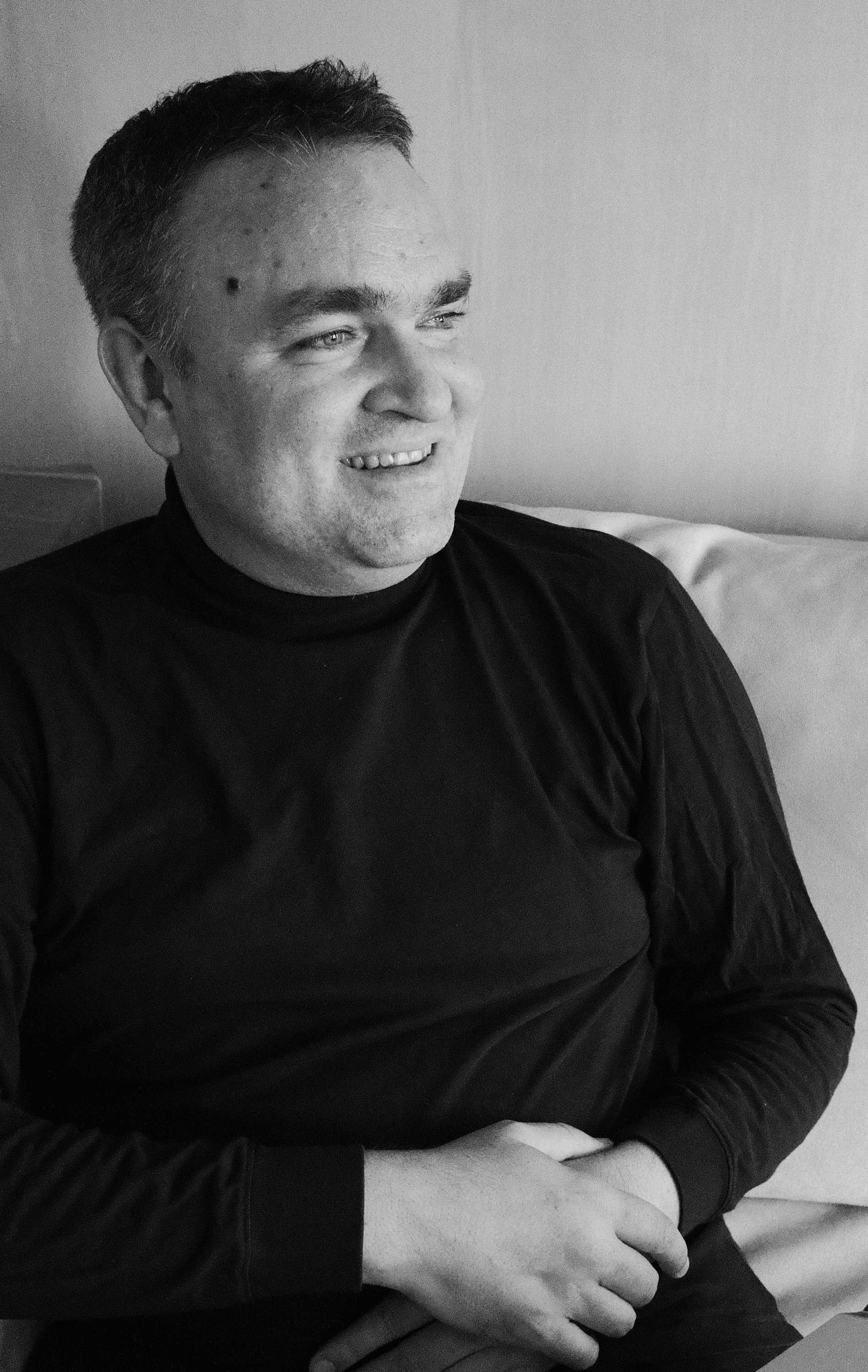
- The composer in 2025
- Period: Contemporary
- Genre: Concerto
- Commissioned by: Orchestre de Paris; Swedish Radio Symphony Orchestra; Symphonieorchester des Bayerischen Rundfunks
- Composed: 2015
- Dedication: Antoine Tamestit
- Published: 2017: Mainz
- Publisher: Schott Music
- Recorded: 2018
- Duration: 27:00
- Movements: 1

Premiere
- Date: 28 October 2015
- Location: Philharmonie de Paris
- Conductor: Paavo Järvi
- Performers: Antoine Tamestit; Orchestre de Paris

Jörg Widmann's Viola Concerto was composed in 2015 and premiered on 28 October 2015 with soloist Antoine Tamestit and the Orchestre de Paris under the direction of Paavo Järvi at Philharmonie de Paris. The concerto attracted attention, because of its theatralic aspects.

== History ==
The original commission of the viola concerto by Tamestit dates back to the year 2008. The concerto, dedicated to Tamestit and realized in 2015, was finally commissioned by Orchestre de Paris, Swedish Radio Symphony Orchestra and Bavarian Radio Symphony Orchestra.

In a performance of Hector Berlioz's Harold in Italy in May 2015 Tamestit was wandering through the orchestra while playing the viola solo part. (Note: Based on an idea by conductor Sir John Eliot Gardiner.) Widmann took up the idea. Widmann and Tamestit (Note: Both have been also long-standing chamber music partners.) worked close together during the creation process of the concerto. The unusual piece is tailored to Tamestit's technical and theatrical skills.

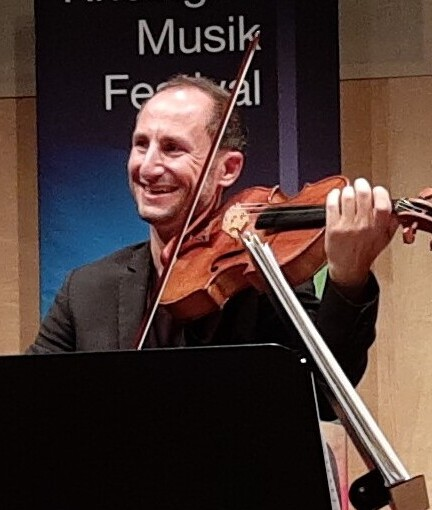
Soloist Tamestit, the dedicatee of the concerto in 2023

== Structure ==
The viola concerto of operatic approach has a duration of about half an hour and is in a single movement. At the beginning, the violist discovers his instrument through tapping and pizzicato. (Note: Score: 12 Pages of Pizzicato.) The concerto becomes later more traditional with using the bow. Starting near the harps and ending in the traditional position nearby the conductor, the viola soloist takes seven positions on the stage (Note: The score contains a diagram of the orchestra setup.) and becomes a partner or opponent to bongos, bass flute, two harps, double basses, tuba and percussion. At one point of the concerto, after an extremely difficult run, the soloist screams. After an Aria, (Note: Additionally Widmann composed in 2015 the piece Aria for strings, with solo violin and solo viola.) the solo viola plays a glissando and the viola's C string is tuned down fading into silence.

=== Playing techniques ===
Tamestit: Widmann in London (playing techniques) on YouTube

- tapping the chinrest
- fingerboard tapping
- pizzicato (glissando, chord)
- bow
- tuning the instrument
- spazzolato (brushing the strings)
- singing together while playing
- tuning down

== Instrumentation ==
- Woodwinds: 4 flutes (all doubling piccolo, 3rd doubling alto flute, 4th doubling bass flute), 4 clarinets in A (1st doubling in B♭, 3rd doubling bass clarinet, 4th doubling contrabass clarinet), 4 bassoon (4th doubling double bassoon)
- Brass: 4 horns in F, 3 trumpets in C, 3 trombones, tuba
- Percussion: timpani, percussion (3 players)
- Strings: 4 violins, 3 violas, 3 violoncellos, 8 double basses (5th–8th: 5-stringed)
- 2 harps, celesta, piano (also with scotch glass)

The instrumentation is light but bass-oriented.

== Performances ==
The world premiere was on 28 October 2015 in Philharmonie de Paris, followed by performances in Stockholm and Munich.

Philharmonie de Paris

As of 2022, the concerto was performed some 20 times.

== Reception ==
Music critic Andrew Clements of The Guardian described the viola concerto as a "substantial piece" with "outstanding virtuosity". Mark S. Jordan (Seen and Heard International) wrote about a "theatrical tour de force". Inge Kjemtrup (Strings magazine): "extraordinary". Tamestit's biography at New York Philharmonic states, that Widmann's Viola Concerto is "among the most important works Tamestit has premiered" Angela Kratschmer wrote in the Journal of the American Viola Society: "travel narrative for the twenty-first century" and "postmodern viola-as-actor". Michael Klier from Bachtrack wrote: "This viola concerto has added something truly new to current concert practice." ("Der gegenwärtigen Konzertpraxis ist mit diesem Bratschenkonzert etwas wirklich Neues hinzugefügt worden.") Le Figaro: "The work is made to measure for Tamestit, his style of playing, his tone, his personality."

== Recordings ==
- Viola Concerto, Duos, Hunting Quartet, Antoine Tamestit, Signum Quartet, Daniel Harding, Bavarian Radio Symphony Orchestra (Harmonia Mundi 2018) OCLC 1029675535 (Editor’s Choice des BBC Music Magazine, 2019 Premier Award at the BBC Music Magazine Awards)
