= Partita (Widmann) =

Partita by Jörg Widmann

- Partita by Jörg Widmann
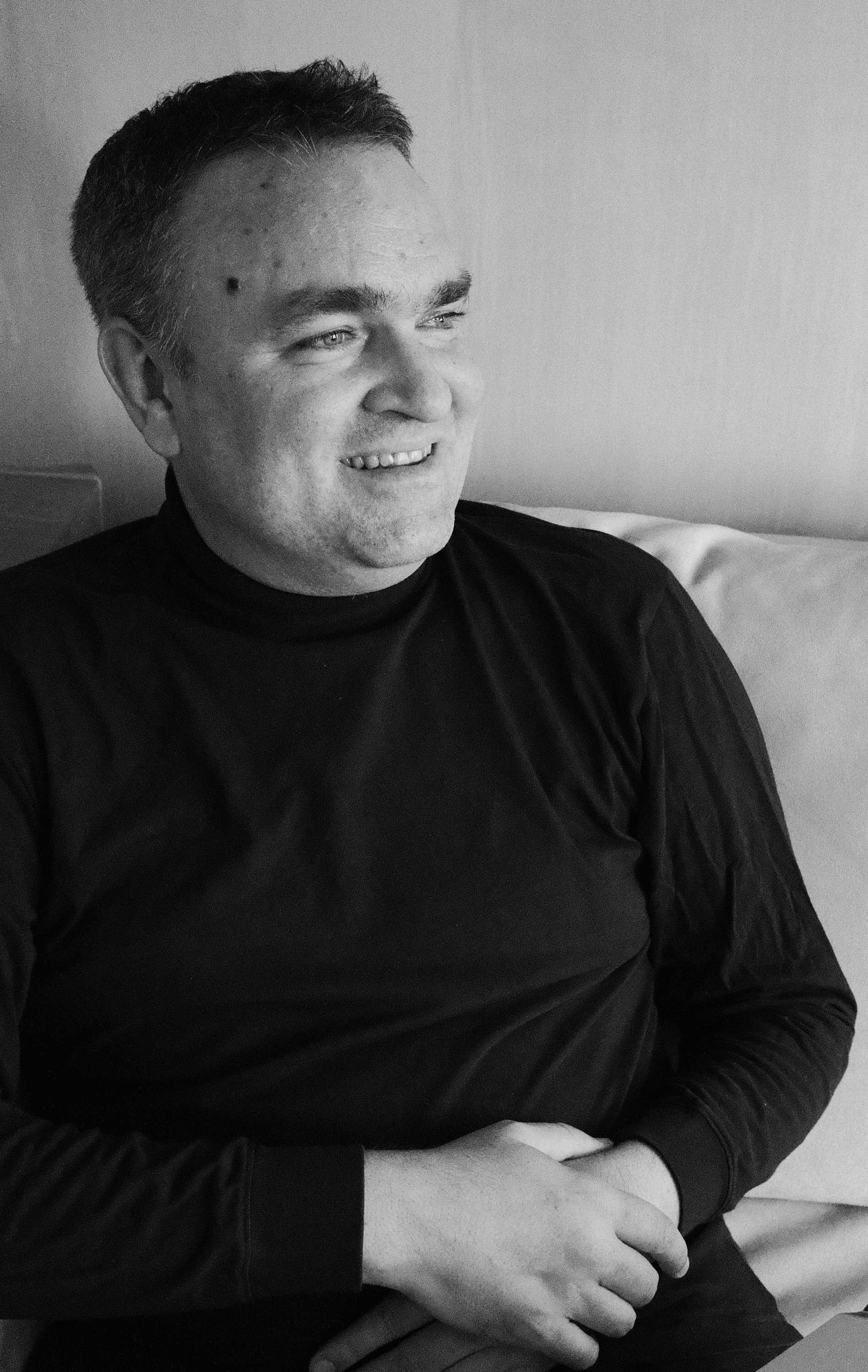
- The composer in 2025
- Period: Contemporary
- Composed: 2017–2018
- Published: 2018: Mainz
- Publisher: Schott Music
- Duration: 36:00

Premiere
- Date: 8 March 2018
- Location: Gewandhaus, Leipzig
- Conductor: Andris Nelsons
- Performers: Leipzig Gewandhaus Orchestra

Partita, five reminiscences for large orchestra is a collection of musical pieces by Jörg Widmann. It was written for the 275th anniversary of the Leipzig Gewandhaus Orchestra in 2018.

== History ==
Widmann was appointed for the season 2017–2018 as the first Gewandhauskomponist (Gewandhaus composer). Leipzig Gewandhaus Orchestra and Boston Symphony Orchestra commissioned Partita in 2015 as part of the collaboration between both orchestras. The work was composed from 2017 to 2018 for the 275th anniversary of the Gewandhaus Orchestra.

== Structure ==
The five reminiscences, a partita, are:

1. Grave – Gigue
2. Andante
3. Divertimento
4. Sarabande
5. Chaconne

== Music ==
The five pieces refer to the musical history of Leipzig and Boston. All movements begin with woodwinds. The whole concept of Partita is to link the music of Bach and Mendelssohn. The first reminiscence is influenced by Bach, Bruckner, and Wagner. A bass clarinet solo, playing an endless melody line, dominates the opening, followed by a section with Wagner tubas. The expansionary prelude leads to a first dance of the orchestra, a brief gigue. The "melancholic" second reminiscence Andante cites Mendelssohn's Clarinet Sonata (2nd movement), but starts with an English horn solo.

Mendelssohn: Clarinet Sonata (2nd movement: Andante)

Mendelssohn was the Gewandhauskapellmeister from 1835 to 1847. Woodwind figures open the "humorous" third movement of neo-Baroque ancestry. Widmann cites in the Divertimento the Bach cantata Tue Rechnung! Donnerwort, BWV 168. The fourth reminiscence, Sarabande, contains bassoons whimpering in highest register. The last reminiscence, a chaconne, starts with a modern decatonic scale, (Note: Asymmetrical scale, comprising 8 semitones and two whole tones.) played by an alto flute. Reminiscence: Bach's Crucifixus from Mass in B minor. This final movement leads to a "joyful, ecstatic" coda.

Decatonic scale

Widmann: Experiment on a Fugue, string quartet No. 5 with soprano

== Instrumentation ==
- Woodwinds: 4 flutes (1st–3rd doubling piccolo, 2nd doubling alto flute), 4 oboes (2nd doubling oboe d'amore, 3rd doubling cor anglais), 4 clarinets in A and B♭ (3rd doubling bass clarinet, 4th doubling contrabass clarinet), 4 bassoons (3rd doubling double bassoon)
- Brass: 6 horns in F (3rd–6th doubling wagner tubas [3rd and 5th in B♭, 4th and 6th in F]), 4 trumpets in C (1st and 2nd doubling in high B♭), 3 trombones, tuba
- Strings: 16 violins I, 14 violins II, 12 violas, 10 cellos, 8 double basses (all with 5 strings, with B as lowest string)
- Percussion: 3 players (glockenspiel, xylophone, tubular bells, triangle, 2 suspended cymbals, crash cymbals, sizzle cymbal, Chinese cymbals, 3 tam-tams, gong, tambourine, vibraslap, ratchet, whip, birch brush, crotales, wood blocks, tom-toms, bass drum), timpani
- harp, celesta (doubling harpsichord)

== Performances ==
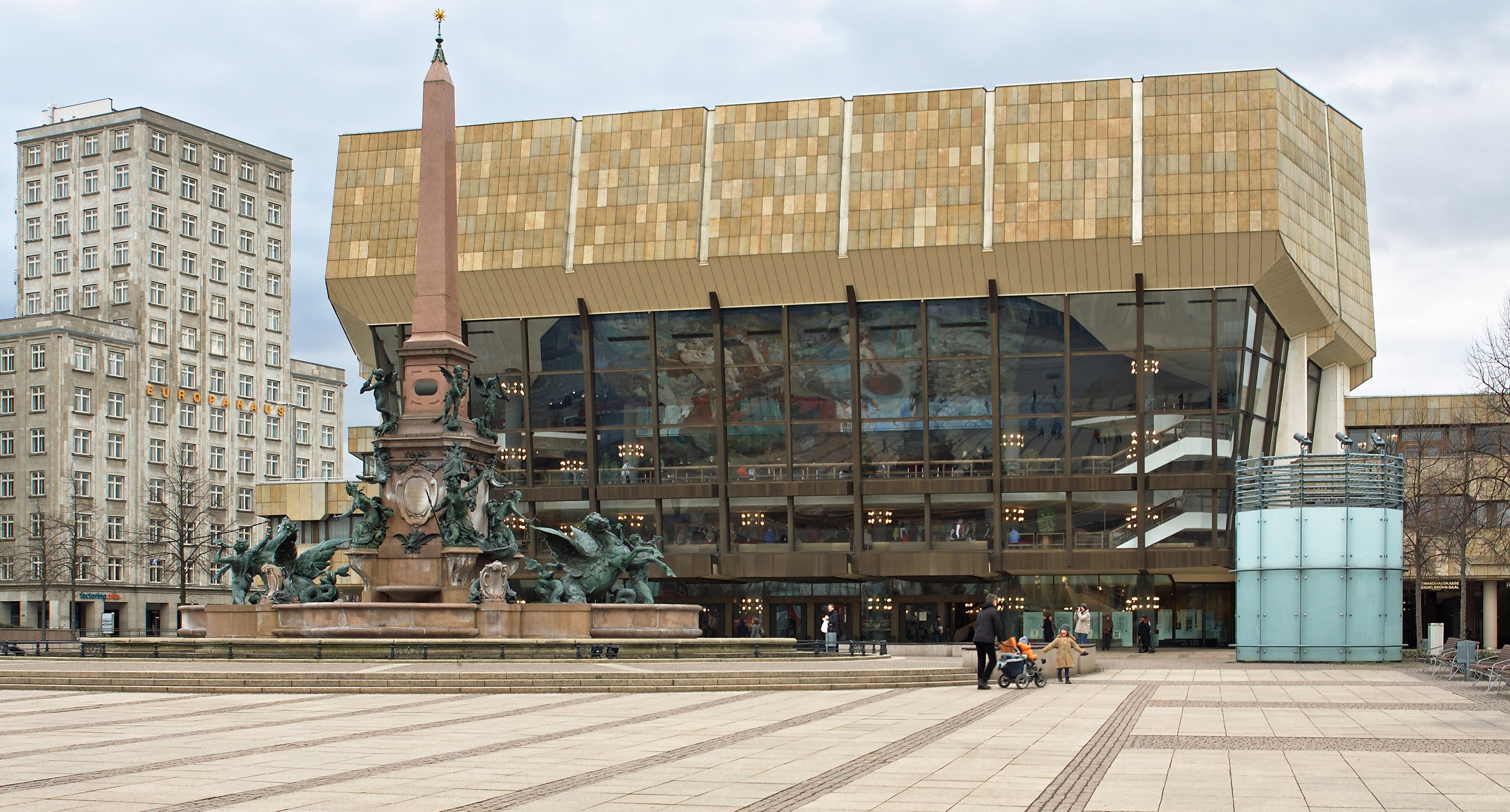
Gewandhaus Leipzig in 2011

Partita was premiered at the Gewandhaus in Leipzig on 8 March 2018. Andris Nelsons conducted the Leipzig Gewandhaus Orchestra. The concert was repeated on 11 March 2018, the 275th birthday of the orchestra. The American premiere took place in Boston on 29 March 2018 with Nelsons conducting the Boston Symphony Orchestra.

== Reception ==
Peter Korfmacher of Leipziger Volkszeitung wrote: "overripe opulence" ("überreife Üppigkeit") and "infinitely long, infinitely beautiful woodwind lines" ("unendlich lange unendlich schöne Holzbläser-Linien").
