= David Rakowski =

American composer and typeface designer (born 1958)

David Rakowski (born June 13, 1958, St. Albans, Vermont) is an American composer and typeface designer. He studied under such composers as Robert Ceely, John Heiss, Milton Babbitt, Peter Westergaard, Paul Lansky, and Luciano Berio. In 2006, he was awarded the Chamber Music Society of Lincoln Center's 2004–2006 Elise L. Stoeger Prize. He has twice been a finalist for the Pulitzer Prize for Music: in 1999 for Persistent Memory and in 2002 for his second symphony Ten of a Kind.

He has released dozens of typefaces since the 1990s, mostly as freeware, which include both original designs and revivals (such as "Lemiesz" – a free version of Publicity Gothic, 1916 – and "Harting", a typewriter face in the "grunge" style). In addition, he also created a font for American musician Ken Ueno.

== See also ==
- Joseph H. Bearns Prize
