= Babylon (opera) =

2012 opera by Jörg Widmann

- Opera by Jörg Widmann
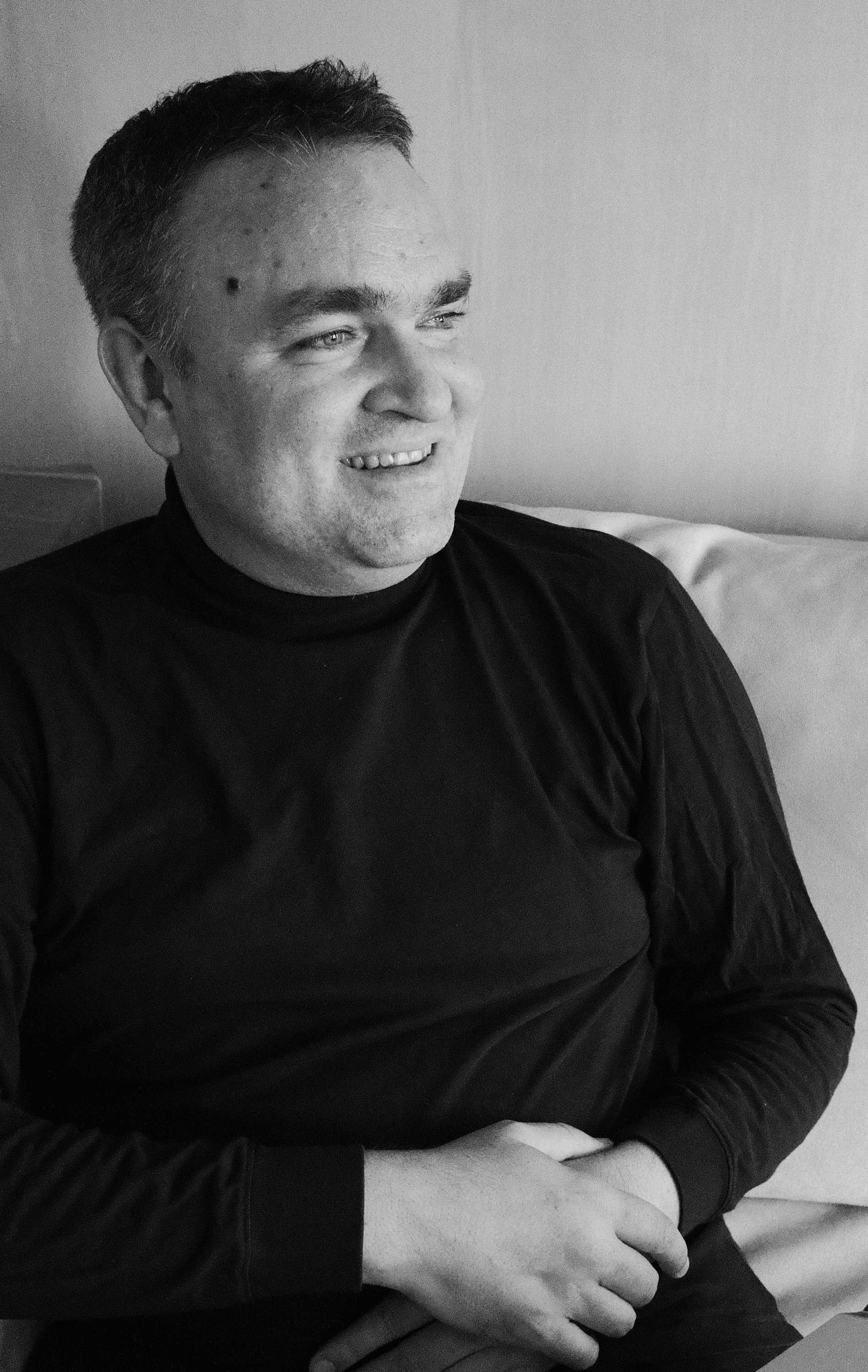
- The composer in 2025
- Librettist: Peter Sloterdijk
- Language: German
- Premiere: 27 October 2012; Bavarian State Opera, Munich

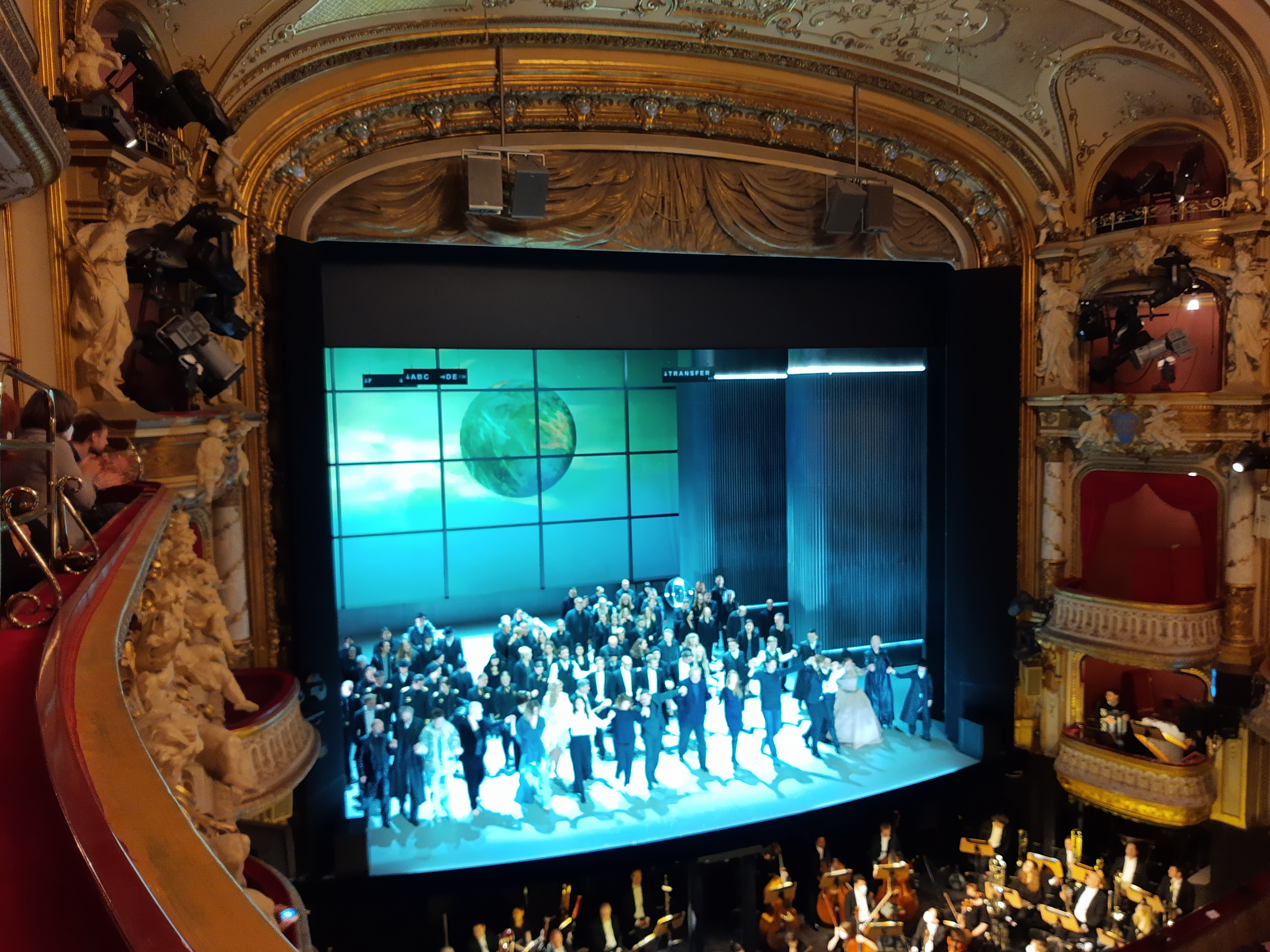
Widmann, Babylon, opening performance of the Internationale Maifestspiele 2022 at Hessisches Staatstheater Wiesbaden, curtain call including the composer

Babylon is an opera in seven scenes by Jörg Widmann, with a libretto in German by Peter Sloterdijk. The opera describes life in a multi-religious and multi-cultural metropolis. It was premiered by the Bavarian State Opera, conducted by Kent Nagano, on 27 October 2012.

== Background and performance history ==
The stage work Babylon was written by Jörg Widmann on a commission by the Bavarian State Opera. (Note: Babylon is Widmann's second large-scale opera. His first opera is Das Gesicht im Spiegel.) The opera was composed from 2011 to 2012. Librettist and composer were not held to any restrictions. The librettist Peter Sloterdijk describes life in a multi-religious and multi-cultural metropolis, the rise and fall of an empire. His essay God's Zeal, that deals with the three major monotheistic religions, Judaism, Christianity and Islam, possibly influenced the libretto.

The Bavarian State Opera presented the world premiere of Widmann's Babylon, (Note: 2011–2012, duration: 160 minutes (Taken from original score DNB-IDN 1028649541).) conducted by Kent Nagano on 27 October 2012 in National Theatre Munich. The production was directed by Carlus Padrissa (La Fura dels Baus).

A revised version of the opera (Note: 2018, duration: 130 minutes.) was premiered on 9 March 2019 at the Staatsoper Unter den Linden Berlin. Conductor of the new production by Andreas Kriegenburg was Christopher Ward, replacing Daniel Barenboim. In the revision Widmann used live electronics for the first time at the end. The action takes place in a cave-like underground.

In 2022, a new production of the opera, based on the revised version, was performed by the Staatstheater Wiesbaden. It was part of the May Festival Wiesbaden. The setting is an airport lounge. Sarah Traubel appeared as Inanna, Daniela Kerck directed and created the stage design, projections by London-based video designer Astrid Steiner, and Albert Horne was the conductor and chorus master.

The first performance of Widmann's Babylon Suite, a commission of Grafenegg Festival and Deutsches Symphonie-Orchester Berlin, took place on 21 August 2014 in Grafenegg under the direction of Kent Nagano. The Babylon Suite is based on Widmann's opera and incorporates vocal parts into the orchestra.

== Reception ==
The premiere of Babylon was reviewed critically by several newspapers. The New York Times noted that Widmann's hard work received a major forum, that Sloterdijk's libretto is overstuffed and often inscrutable, and the production is extravagant. Die Zeit wrote about an indifferent libretto, a monstrous score and old men's lust (Altherrenerotik), Süddeutsche Zeitung about howling wind players, opulent pictures and strange music. Die Welt wrote: "alphabet soup of sound salad: orgiastic, bombastic" ("Buchstabensuppe an Klangsalat, orgiastisch bombastisch."). Die Deutsche Bühne wrote 2022: "colorful, visually stunning staging".

The premiere of the revision of the opera in 2019 received positive and mostly negative "icely" reviews.

Die Deutsche Bühne wrote about the 2022 Wiesbaden production: "Wiesbaden made a convincing plea for Widmann's Babylon, but it remains to be seen whether the piece will be suitable for the repertoire."

== Music ==
Babylon is a polystylistic opera. A special musical style is Widmann's version of the Bayerischer Defiliermarsch and Tiroler Holzhackerbuab'n from his composition Dubairische Tänze in Scene III "The New Year Festival". Self-quotation within the opera are Teufel Amor, Con brio, Antiphon and Messe. Another example is a baroque chorale. The work is characterized by cinematic editing techniques and various multimedia layers. Widmann remains on the ground of tonality, but pushes it to the limits of the diatonic. Significant are the colossal chord layers in the manner of Gustav Mahler or Alban Berg. References are made to Strauss's Salome and Mozart's Magic Flute.

== Roles ==
Role	Voice type	Premiere cast, 27 October 2012 Conductor: Kent Nagano	Premiere cast (revision), 9 March 2019 Conductor: Christopher Ward
Inanna	high soprano	Anna Prohaska	Susanne Elmark
Die Seele (The Soul)	high soprano	Claron McFadden	Mojca Erdmann
Tammu	tenor	Jussi Myllys	Charles Workman
Priesterkönig (Priest King)	bass-baritone	Willard White	John Tomlinson
Der Tod (The Death)	bass-baritone	Willard White	Otto Katzameier
Euphrat	dramatic mezzo soprano	Gabriele Schnaut	Marina Prudenskaya
Skorpionmensch (Scorpion Man)	countertenor	Kai Wessel	Andrew Watts
Ein Schreiber (A Writer)	bass	Tareq Nazmi	David Oštrek
Priester (Priest)	tenor	Joshua Stewart	Florian Hoffmann
Ezechiel	narrator	August Zirner	Felix von Manteuffel

== Instrumentation ==
Widmann scored Babylon for a large orchestra with 90 players:

- Woodwinds: 4 flutes (all doubling piccolo, 3rd doubling alto flute, 4th doubling bass flute), 4 oboes (2nd doubling oboe d'amore, 3rd doubling cor anglais, 4th doubling heckelphone), 4 clarinets in B♭ (2nd doubling clarinet in E♭, 3rd doubling bass clarinet, 4th doubling double bass clarinet), 4 bassoons (3rd and 4th double bassoon)
- Brass: 4 horns (doubling 4 natural horns), 4 trumpets, 4 trombones (3rd and 4th doubling bass trombone or contrabass trombone), tuba
- Strings: 14 violins I, 12 violins II, 10 violas, 8 cellos, 8 double basses (4 of them 5-stringed)
- Percussion: 4 players, timpani
- 2 harps, celesta, accordion, glass armonica (2018 revision), piano (behind the stage), organ (behind the stage)

== Synopsis ==
The opera is about the conflicts that arise from the love of Tammu, a Jew in exile, to Inanna, a Babylonian priestess in the temple of free love.

Each of the seven scenes comes with its own musical form, Widmann adds seven septets, seven dancers.

The seven scenes of the opera: (Note: The number seven appears frequently in Babylonian magical rituals. In the opera it is used to establish the order.)

=== Prologue ===
- "In Front of the Relics of the Walls of a Ruined City"

The Scorpion Man dwells upon the ruins of Babylon, declaring whoever rebuilds this city shall be cursed. (Note: Taken from Epic of Gilgamesh.)

=== Scene I ===
- "Within the Walls of Babylon" (duration: 45 min)

The soul, a stranger in the Babylonian world, mourns its loneliness for its "brother", Tammu, a Jewish exile. Tammu struggles to convince his feelings of love to the Babylonian goddess Inanna. Inanna succeeds into comforting Tammu and dispelling his doubts, and they fall in love with each other. Inanna, however, gives Tammu a herb that allows him to see the "truth" of Babylon and love in his dreams.

=== Scene II ===
- "Flood and Star Terror"
  - planet septet

The Euphrates leaves its bed, the flood comes expressed by chaos and confusion. After the flood, The Priest King promises that peace and order will be achieved between heaven and earth through a human sacrifice.

=== Scene III ===
- "The New Year Festival"
  - genitalia septets
  - monkey septet

An orgiastic, carnival-like New Year festival held by the Babylonians and Inanna with Bavarian-Babylonian marches, processions, cabaret numbers, and excesses has begun. The celebration is however interrupted by the Jews and their leader Ezechiel, who considered this a blasphemy. Tammu then begins to question himself of his true belonging.

=== Scene IV ===
- "At the Waters of Babylon"

The Jews reflect about their religion. Ezekiel has the writer write down his promptings, which deal with the Flood and of which Tammu claims that Ezekiel took over the story from the Babylonians. He writes down that Noah did not sacrifice his son, but animals, in gratitude for surviving. Tammu is selected by the Babylonian Priest King to be sacrificed.

=== Interlude ===
- "Babylon Idyll, Night Music for Hanging Gardens"

(2012 Munich premiere only, not included in the revised version) The soul addresses to the audience that stars are not just light in the night sky, rather they are twinkling messengers. A solo clarinetist is also seen onstage.

=== Scene V ===
- "The Feast of the Sacrifice"

Tammu is sacrificed by the Priest King. Upon discovering the sacrifice, Inanna and the Soul vow to rescue Tammu from the underworld.

=== Scene VI ===
- "Inanna in the Underworld"

Inanna enters the underworld, with all of her jewelry stripped from her, with the underworld porters stating "Also sind sie Gesetze der Gebieterin! (Thus are the laws from our mistress!)". Inanna convinces her sister Death, to release Tammu from the underworld, eventually rescuing Tammu from the underworld.

=== Scene VII ===
- "The New Rainbow" (duration: 7 min) (Note: The seven scenes get progressively shorter, the opera is constructed like a Ziggurat temple.)
  - rainbow septet

Once Tammu and Inanna arrive back to Babylon, a new covenant with humankind, based on number seven, replaces the old sacrifice. Inanna and Tammu vow to stay with each other, and the Soul vows that she will remain with Tammu.

=== Epilogue ===
- "The constellation of the Scorpion"

There are two endings to this opera.

- 2012, Munich: The scorpion directs its sting on itself, it kills the illusion, to be reborn in its higher form, the eagle.
- 2019, Berlin, Revised Premiere: The scorpion directs its sting on itself, and two children sing a rhyme.
