= Sarah Traubel =

German opera singer

- Born: 12 July 1986 (age 39); Leimen, Germany
- Education: Universität der Künste Berlin; Mozarteum; Manhattan School of Music
- Occupation: Operatic soprano
- Website: sarahtraubel.com

Sarah Traubel (born 12 July 1986) is a German soprano in opera and concert who has performed leading roles at major opera houses and festivals. While focused on Mozart's operas, she has also performed in contemporary opera, such as Inanna in Jörg Widmann's Babylon for the opening of the 2022 Internationale Maifestspiele Wiesbaden.

== Career ==
Traubel was born in Leimen, the great-niece of Metropolitan Opera singer Helen Traubel. She studied at the Universität der Künste Berlin, at the Mozarteum in Salzburg with Barbara Bonney where she graduated with distinction, and at the Manhattan School of Music. She took master classes with Francisco Araiza, Julie Kaufmann and Angelika Kirchschlager.

=== Opera ===
Traubel was a member of the studio of the Opernhaus Zürich. During that time, she was recognised when she stepped in at gala performance of Mozart's Die Entführung aus dem Serail in honour of Intendant Alexander Pereira; she performed the leading role of as Konstanze in the first act, while Vilislava Gospodinova, flown in by helicopter, took over in the second act, and in the third act, Traubel acted while Gospodinova sang from the side. Traubel has collaborated with conductors such as Ádám Fischer, Daniele Gatti, Ingo Metzmacher. She appeared in Zürich also as Queen of the Night in Mozart's Die Zauberflöte), Titania in Britten's A Midsummer Night's Dream), Rosina in Mozart's La finta semplice, Amor in Haydn's L'anima del filosofo and the Angel in Pfitzner's Palestrina.

She made two role debuts at the Salzburg Festival, as Amor in Gluck's Orfeo ed Euridice and as Ilia in Mozart's Idomeneo. In the 2018/19 season, she first performed the role of Donna Anna in Mozart's Don Giovanni at Theater Freiburg, and later first the Countess in Mozart's Le nozze di Figaro.

In 2022, Traubel appeared as Inanna in Jörg Widmann's Babylon for the opening of the Internationale Maifestspiele Wiesbaden at the Staatstheater Wiesbaden. A reviewer noted the precision of her extreme coloraturas. Traubel has collaborated with directors including Jens-Daniel Herzog and Harry Kupfer.

=== Concert ===
In 2020, Traubel performed the soprano solo in Mahler's Symphony No. 4 with the Mannheimer Philharmoniker, also on a tour. She appeared in Pergolesi's Stabat Mater alongside Andreas Scholl. She performed in Beethoven's Ninth Symphony with the Brandenburgisches Staatsorchester, and in Mozart's Requiem in the Mannheim Mannheimer Rosengarten.
