= Con brio (Widmann) =

Concert overture by Jörg Widmann

- Concert overture by Jörg Widmann
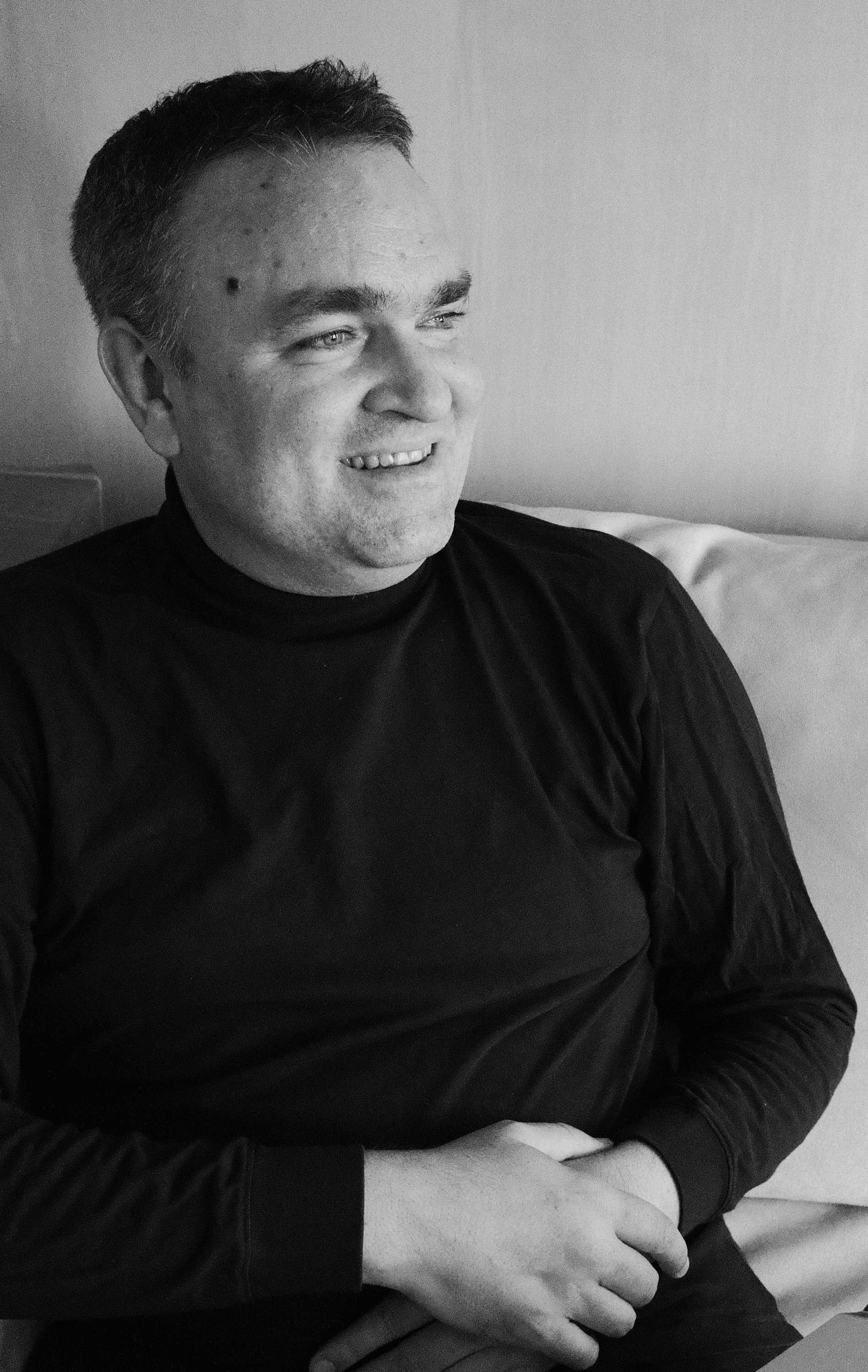
- The composer in 2025
- Period: Contemporary
- Composed: 2008
- Published: 2008: Mainz
- Publisher: Schott Music
- Recorded: 25 September 2008
- Duration: 12:00

Premiere
- Date: 25 September 2008
- Location: Gasteig, Munich
- Conductor: Mariss Jansons
- Performers: Bavarian Radio Symphony Orchestra

Con brio is a concert overture by Jörg Widmann influenced by Beethoven. It is a commission by the Bayerischer Rundfunk.

== History ==
Mariss Jansons said that the new piece should be performed along with a pure Beethoven program. The overture was composed in 2008. It was written in a "mad hurry".

== Music ==
Widmann refers to musical characteristics of Beethoven’s 7th and 8th Symphonies. There are no exact quotations from the symphonies, but he has chosen the same instrumentation. According to Widmann, it is an exercise in fury and rhythmic insistence. Fragmented motifs are fired between orchestra groups.

Motif I

Motif II

In a very small space, a sonata form is presented before the recurring material is arranged into a scherzo. The overture is run through with Beethovenian riffs, flourishes and humor and is like a deconstruction of Beethoven. The piece, full of extended techniques, has a cut-and-paste structure. The timpani are in the focus from the beginning of the overture.

The metronome markings are deliberately selected at a fast speed. The score contains six dense pages of written instructions.

== Instrumentation ==
The concert overture is scored for a Beethoven sized orchestra, with 2 flutes (both doubling piccolo), 2 oboes, 2 clarinets, 2 bassoons, 2 horns, 2 trumpets, timpani, and strings.

== Performances ==
Con brio was premiered by the Bavarian Radio Symphony Orchestra conducted by Mariss Jansons on 25 September 2008 in Munich, Gasteig, Philharmonie.

== Recordings ==
- Con brio (with Beethoven: Symphony No. 7 & 8), Mariss Jansons, Bavarian Radio Symphony Orchestra (BR-Klassik 2015) OCLC 1017093816

== Reception ==
Anthony Tommasini from The New York Times wrote: "effective as a warm-up". David Allen from The New York Times wrote: "One of the most performed orchestral works written this century".
