= Bach Prize of the Free and Hanseatic City of Hamburg =

German music award

- Awarded for: "composers, whose works would meet the demands of Bach."
- Sponsored by: the Senate and the Hamburg Parliament
- Location: Hamburg
- Country: Germany
- Reward: €10,000
- First award: 1951
- Website: https://www.hamburg.de/politik-und-verwaltung/behoerden/behoerde-fuer-kultur-und-medien/themen/kulturfoerderung/kulturpreise-des-senats/bach-preis-108640

The Bach Prize of the Free and Hanseatic City of Hamburg (German: Bach-Preis der Freien und Hansestadt Hamburg) has been awarded since 1951, since 1975 every four years. On the occasion of the 200th anniversary of the death of Johann Sebastian Bach, the prize was founded in 1950 by the Senate and the Hamburg Parliament. The prize is endowed with €10,000 and is awarded to composers, whose works would meet the demands of Bach. €5,000 are earmarked for scholarships.

== Recipients ==
- 1951 Paul Hindemith
- 1954 Philipp Jarnach
- 1957 Boris Blacher
- 1960 Wolfgang Fortner
- 1963 Johann Nepomuk David
- 1966 Ernst Krenek
- 1972 Helmut Lachenmann
- 1975 György Ligeti
- 1979 Olivier Messiaen
- 1983 Hans Werner Henze
- 1987 Aribert Reimann
- 1992 Alfred Schnittke
- 1995 Karlheinz Stockhausen
- 1999 Wolfgang Rihm
- 2003 Adriana Hölszky
- 2007 Sofia Gubaidulina
- 2011 Tan Dun
- 2015 Pierre Boulez
- 2019 Unsuk Chin
- 2023 Jörg Widmann
