= Das Gesicht im Spiegel =

2003 opera by Jörg Widmann

- Opera by Jörg Widmann
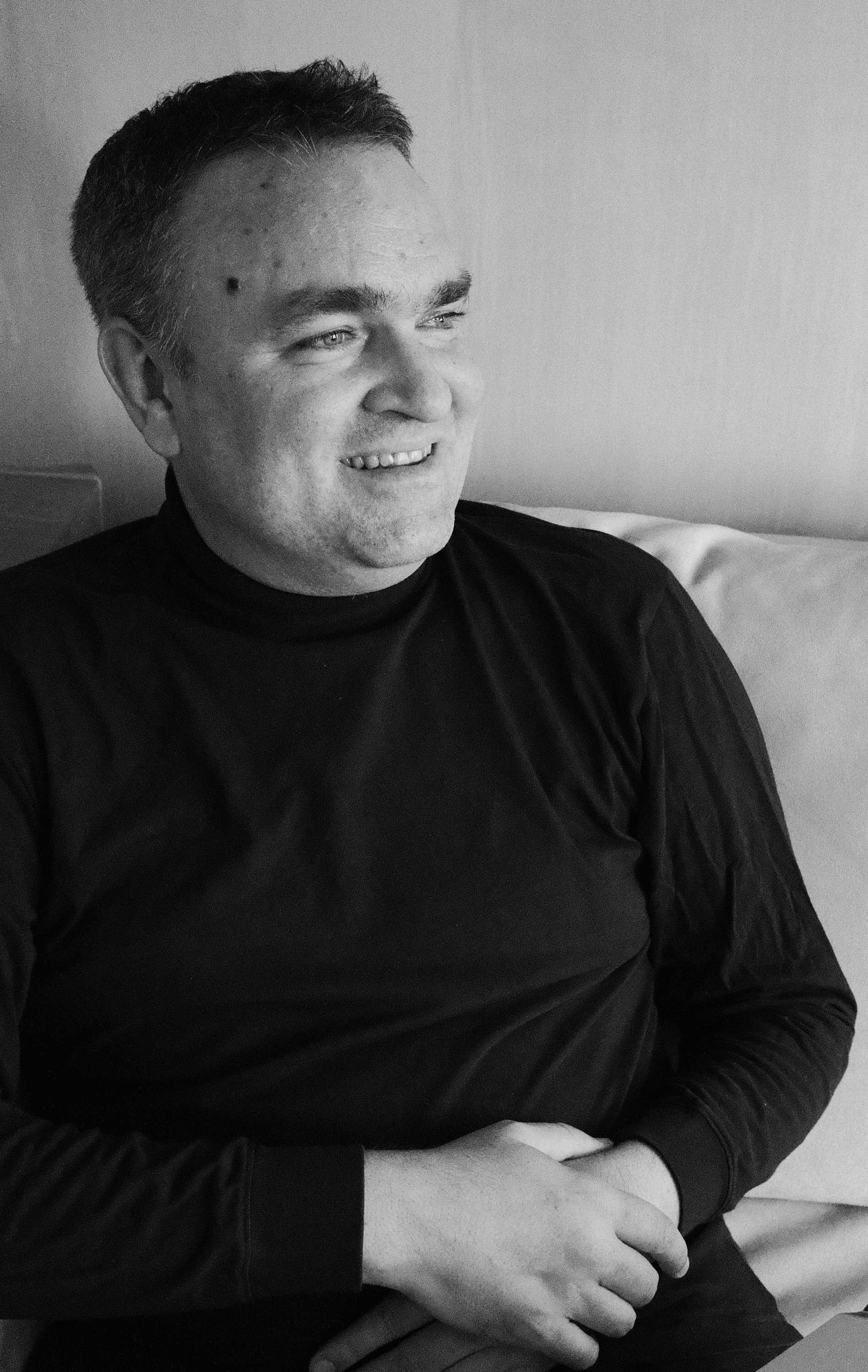
- The composer in 2025
- Translation: The Face in the Mirror
- Librettist: Roland Schimmelpfennig
- Language: German
- Premiere: 17 July 2003; Cuvilliés Theatre, Munich

Das Gesicht im Spiegel (The Face in the Mirror) is an opera in 16 scenes by Jörg Widmann, with a libretto in German by Roland Schimmelpfennig. The opera is about the emotional consequences and ethical issues of human cloning. The opera was premiered at the Cuvilliés Theatre in Munich on 17 July 2003, conducted by Peter Rundel.

== Background and performance history ==
Jörg Widmann received in 2000 a commission from the Bavarian State Opera for the 2003 Munich Opera Festival. Sir Peter Jonas, manager of the Bavarian State Opera, commissioned an opera that would address a contemporary issue. The libretto by Roland Schimmelpfennig deals with the emotional consequences and ethical issues of human cloning. The stage work was composed from 2002 to 2003 and finished in Freiburg on 11 June 2003.

The opera was premiered at the Cuvilliés Theatre Munich on 17 July 2003, with the Orchestra of the Bavarian State Opera conducted by Peter Rundel and Tölzer Knabenchor. Das Gesicht im Spiegel, Widmann's first full-length work, was chosen by critics of the Opernwelt as the most important premiere of the season 2003–2004. The opera was also performed two years later in Theater Krefeld und Mönchengladbach conducted by Kenneth Duryea. In March 2010 a revised version of the opera was premiered in Opernhaus Düsseldorf conducted by Axel Kober.

In September 2022, the opera would be performed at the Neue Oper Wien, with Walter Kobéra conducting, and Carlos Wagner directing the stage. This production would go on to give the Hungarian premiere at Müpa Budapest.

== Roles ==
Role	Voice type	Premiere cast, 17 July 2003 Conductor: Peter Rundel
Patrizia	high soprano	Salome Kammer
Justine	soprano	Julia Rempe
Bruno	baritone	Dale Duesing
Milton	baritone	Richard Salter
Children Choir	4 soprano, 4 mezzo, 4 alto + ad lib.	Tölzer Knabenchor

== Instrumentation ==
The opera uses a small orchestra, with only 23 players.

- Woodwinds: 2 flutes, 2 clarinets (A, B♭), 2 bassoons
- Brass: 2 horns (F), trumpet (C), trombone
- Strings: 4 violins, 3 cellos, double bass
- Percussion: 2 players
- piano, guitar, accordion

== Synopsis ==
The opera in sixteen scenes can be divided in three parts: (Note: The sixteen scenes run attacca into one another.)

=== Scene 1–5 ===
- The dependence of the biotech company owner on stock-market fluctuations

=== Scene 6–10 ===
- Exposure of the clone to the outside world

=== Scene 11–16 ===
- Problems that arise from a love triangle
