= Oleg Felzer =

Azerbaijani composer (1939-1998)

Oleg Felzer (1939–1998) was an Azerbaijani and Soviet composer and teacher. He was born in Azerbaijan and taught at the Baku Conservatory for many years before coming to New York City from Baku in 1989. His pieces have been commissioned by the Continuum Ensemble and the Chamber Music Society of Lincoln Center. He died in New York.

== List of works ==
Oleg Felzer's works in 1960-1998 is listed in Oleg Felzer scores and sound recordings.

- And Harold Again, for viola solo and chamber orchestra, dedicated to Berlioz (1982)
- Autographs on the Silhouettes, for violin, cello and piano (1987)
- Children Suite, for orchestra (1978)
- Dialogue, for viola, piano and orchestra (1970)
- Five Bagatelles, for piano (1986)
- Five Tanka, for tenor and chamber orchestra (lost) or for tenor and piano (1967)
- Four Diary Pages, for chamber orchestra, commissioned by the Nieuw Ensemble (1994)
- Four Piano Pieces, Op. 1, (1960-1962)
  - Watercolor, Etude, Imprint, March (lost)
- Four Songs (1969)
  - Bird, Red Bird also for piano
- The House That Jack Built, for mixed chorus and piano (1981-1982) and for children's chorus (1985)
- In Memoriam of Dmitri Shostakovich, for orchestra (1977)
- Intermezzo, for violin and piano (1961)
- Interrupted Song, sonata No. 2 for violin and piano (1998)
  - Completion by Faradzh Karayev exists
- Jubilatio, for violin, viola and piano (1979, 1983) and for violin, viola and strings (1991)
- Piano Sonata No. 2 (1974)
- Pieces for Chamber Ensembles, Installment 1 (1980)
- Playing Bossa Nova, for two pianos (undated)
- Polyphonic Suite, for piano (1965)
- Prelude and Fugue, for organ (1970)
- Procession and Stroll, for orchestra (1976, 1978)
- Protect Your Sons, for bass or baritone, chorus and piano (1972)
- Sinfonia, for chamber orchestra (1966, 1972)
- Sofia Waltz, for two pianos (1981)
- Sonata for Harp (1985)
- Sonata No. 1 for violin and piano (1993)
- Sonata Partita, for organ (1976)
- Sonata for Violin Solo (1978)
- Sonata for Solo Viola (1986)
- Sonatina, or Piano Sonata No. 1 (1963)
- Strange Story, for piano (1962)
- String Quartet (1968)
- Symphony No. 2, for viola, piano and orchestra (lost) and for piano solo (1970)
- Three Pieces, for flute and guitar (1978, 1987)
- Touching Waltz And Postlude, for piano (1988)
- Two Pastorales, for flute and piano (1978) and for flute, cello and piano (1979)
- Two Pieces for Piano: Procession and Stroll (1976)
- Veshomru II, for recorder and two violins (1991)
- Vestige, for clarinet, violin and piano (1993)
- What Are Years?, for chorus, poem by Marianne Moore (1994)
- Woe From Wit, musical, libretto based on the play by Alexander Griboyedov (1979)
- Zaboul, for chamber orchestra (1996)
