= Stefan Dohr =

German hornist (born 1965)

- Born: 3 September 1965 (age 59); Münster, West Germany
- Genres: Classical
- Occupation: Principal horn of the Berlin Philharmonic Orchestra
- Instrument: French horn

Stefan Dohr (born 3 September 1965) is a German horn player and principal horn of the Berlin Philharmonic.

== Biography ==
Born in Münster, Dohr obtained the Solo Horn position of the Frankfurt Opera House at the age of 19.

He held the same position with the Bayreuth Festival Orchestra, the Orchestre Philharmonique de Nice and the Deutsches Symphonie-Orchester Berlin. In 1993, Dohr was chosen to play principal horn of the Berlin Philharmonic.

In March 2008 he played the world premiere of a horn concerto specially composed for him by Austrian composer Herbert Willi. In 2024, he premiered Jörg Widmann's Horn Concerto.

== Memberships ==
- 2024 Foreign member of the Royal Swedish Academy of Music
