= Bachtrack =

Online music magazine

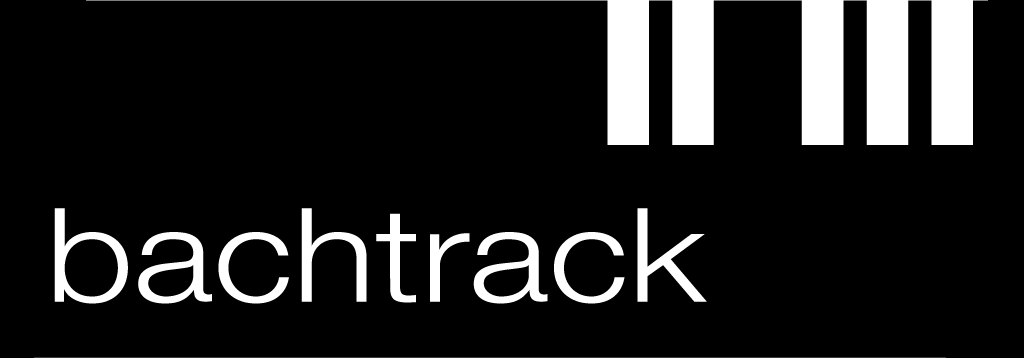
- Company type: Limited company
- Website type: Online magazine, music website
- Available in: English, French, German, Spanish
- Founded: London, United Kingdom
- Headquarters: London, United Kingdom
- Key people: David Karlin, Alison Karlin
- Website: bachtrack.com
- Launched: January 2008

Bachtrack is a London-based international online music magazine which publishes listings of classical music, opera, ballet and dance, as well as reviews of these genres, interviews and general feature articles.

== History ==
Bachtrack Ltd was registered on 3 December 2007 by David Karlin and Alison Karlin. The website bachtrack.com was launched in January 2008, the following month.

Bachtrack's event finder initially covered the UK only. In 2009, coverage expanded to include the US and Europe. The finder permitted users to "search for events by date, country, city, festival, venue, work, composer or musician". By 2010, the site listed 7,000 events and was being described favourably by both local London and national UK press. Bachtrack's first mobile app was launched in late 2009.

In July 2010, Bachtrack was named as no. 5 in Classical Music magazine's top ten Web Winners.

Later in 2010, Bachtrack started publishing reviews of classical music to accompany its listings database. In 2013, a redesigned site permitted operation in French and German, with some original content written in those languages. Spanish was added the following year; however, the main language of the site remains English.

== Database of event listings ==
Bachtrack's database of forthcoming performances covers events worldwide, although coverage varies by country, with the UK generally having the largest number of events listed. The content is crowdsourced, with many listings input by users, who are often the promoters of the event.

== Annual classical music statistics ==
Every January, Bachtrack publishes statistics about the performances listed in its database for the previous year. These receive widespread media attention across the world, in many publications including The New York Times, The Wall Street Journal, The Guardian, France Musique, Clásica FM Radio, and Izvestia.

== Reviews ==
Bachtrack publishes reviews of concerts, opera, ballet and dance performances in a large number of countries, claiming to have published its 10,000th review in December 2016. Bachtrack's reviews are referred to by other arts publications and performers' websites.

== Articles ==
In addition to reviews, Bachtrack publishes general articles including previews of festivals and concert/opera seasons, as well as interviews with performers and industry figures. A number of interviews have sparked interest in the general media, including soprano Lisette Oropesa's statement that she needed to lose weight in order to be cast in the roles she wanted, and tenor Stuart Skelton's comments about English National Opera.
