= Oryx and Crake =

2003 novel by Margaret Atwood

- First edition cover (Canada)
- Author: Margaret Atwood
- Cover artist: Terry Karydes
- Language: English
- Genre: Speculative fiction
- Publisher: McClelland and Stewart (Canada), Bloomsbury (UK), Doubleday (U.S.)
- Publication date: 2003
- Publication place: Canada
- Media type: Print (Hardcover and Paperback)
- ISBN: 0-7710-0868-6 (first edition, hardcover)
- OCLC: 52726798
- Dewey Decimal: 813/.54 22
- LC Class: PR9199.3.A8 O79 2003b
- Followed by: The Year of the Flood

Oryx and Crake is a 2003 novel by Canadian author Margaret Atwood. She has described the novel as speculative fiction and adventure romance, rather than pure science fiction, because it does not deal with things "we can't yet do or begin to do", yet goes beyond the amount of realism she associates with the novel form. It focuses on a lone character called Snowman, who finds himself in a bleak situation with only creatures called Crakers to keep him company. The reader learns of his past, as a boy called Jimmy, and of genetic experimentation and pharmaceutical engineering that occurred under the purview of Jimmy's peer, Glenn "Crake".

The book was first published by McClelland and Stewart. It was shortlisted for the 2003 Man Booker Prize for Fiction, as well as for the 2004 Orange Prize for Fiction. Oryx and Crake is the first of the MaddAddam trilogy, followed by The Year of the Flood (2009) and MaddAddam (2013). It is the basis for the 2023 opera Oryx and Crake composed by Søren Nils Eichberg.

== Plot summary ==
The novel focuses on a character called "Snowman", living in a post-apocalyptic world near a small group of primitive and innocent human-like creatures whom he calls Crakers. Flashbacks reveal that Snowman was once a boy named Jimmy who grew up in a world dominated by multinational corporations that built privileged walled compounds to isolate and protect their employees and the employees' families from a degenerating outside society. The companies had operated by developing and marketing advanced technology products such as medical treatments and genetically engineered hybrid animals, but now no other humans are evident, and the compounds have become decaying ruins.

Near starvation, Snowman decides to return to the ruins of a compound named RejoovenEsense to search for supplies, even though his excursion risks encountering dangers including feral populations of the hybridized animals. He concocts an explanation for the Crakers, who regard him as a teacher, and begins his foraging expedition.

In Snowman's recollection of past events, Jimmy's family moves to the HelthWyzer compound, where his father works as a genetic engineer. Jimmy meets and befriends a brilliant science student named Glenn. Jimmy begins to refer to him as Crake when he uses that name in an online trivia game called Extinctathon. Jimmy and Crake spend much of their leisure time playing online games, smoking "skunkweed", and watching underground videos such as live executions, graphic surgery, Noodie News, frog squashing, and child pornography. During one of their child pornography viewings, Jimmy is very much lovestruck and horrified by the gazing eyes of a young girl seen in the porn known as Hott Tott.

After graduating from high school, Crake attends the highly respected Watson–Crick Institute, where he studies advanced bioengineering, but Jimmy ends up at the loathed Martha Graham Academy, where students study humanities, only valued for their propaganda applications. Jimmy gets a job writing ad copy, while Crake becomes a bioengineer at RejoovenEsense. Crake uses his prominent position to create the Crakers, peaceful, gentle, herbivorous humanoids, who have sexual intercourse only during limited polyandrous breeding seasons. His stated purpose for the Crakers, actually a deliberate deception, is to create "floor models" of all the possible options a family could choose in the genetic manipulation of their future children. Crake's bio-engineering team consists of the most expert players gathered from the online Extinctathon community.

Crake tells Jimmy about another very important project, a Viagra-like super-pill called BlyssPluss, which also promises health and happiness, but secretly causes sterilization in order to address overpopulation. Crake officially hires Jimmy to help market it. At the Rejoov compound, Jimmy notices a human in the Craker habitat and thinks he recognizes her as the girl from the pornographic video. Seemingly unaware of Jimmy's obsession with her, Crake explains that her name is Oryx and that he has hired her as a teacher for the Crakers. Oryx notices Jimmy's feelings for her and makes herself sexually available to him, despite also being Crake's romantic partner. As their relationship progresses, Jimmy becomes increasingly fearful that Crake has found out about it or has known all along. He also makes a promise to both Oryx and Crake that he will look after the Crakers if anything happens to them.

After Crake's wonder drug BlyssPluss is widely distributed, a global pandemic breaks out and begins wiping out the human race and causing mass chaos outside of the protected Rejoov compound. Realizing that the pandemic had been deliberately introduced by Crake and was distributed by including it within BlyssPluss, and sensing further immediate danger, Jimmy grabs a gun and goes to confront Crake, who is returning with Oryx from outside the compound and needs Jimmy to let them in. Crake presents himself to Jimmy with his arm around an unconscious Oryx, saying that he and Jimmy are immune to the virus. Jimmy lets them in, whereupon Crake slits Oryx's throat with a knife. Jimmy then immediately shoots Crake dead.

During Snowman's journey to scavenge supplies, he encounters aggressive hybrid animals and retreats into the RejoovenEsense compound. He finds some indications that other humans have survived – seeing smoke on the horizon near the compound and briefly hearing voices on radio receivers in the compound. He carelessly breaks a scavenged bourbon bottle after binge drinking its content, and cuts his foot on a sliver of the glass. The cut becomes infected. His treatment of the wound with the medications he can find has some initial success, but the infection later gets worse again. He returns to the Crakers' camp and learns that three other humans have recently encountered the Crakers and are camping nearby. Snowman follows the smoke to where they are gathered around a campfire. Snowman is unsure of what to do, and considers killing them. Whether he kills them, introduces himself or quietly flees, and whatever happens afterwards, is left open to question at the end of the book.

== Main characters ==
- Snowman, whose original name is Jimmy, is the main protagonist; the story is told from his perspective. The name "Snowman" is short for "abominable Snowman", a reference to the Yeti, a mythical ape-like creature of the Himalaya. For the online-game Extinctathon, Jimmy temporarily also has the animal code name "Thickney" (bush thick-knee or bush stone-curlew, Burhinus grallarius), which Crake chooses for Jimmy from an Australian bird known for inhabiting cemeteries (p. 81).
- Crake, whose original name is Glenn, is Jimmy's childhood friend; an excellent student in high school, he becomes a brilliant geneticist and eventual mad scientist. He devises a plan to rid the Earth of Homo sapiens and replace this destructive, poorly designed species with a more peaceful and environmentally friendly version. His player-name in Extinctathon is from the red-necked crake, a small Australian bird. In Robin Elliott's essay on Atwood, he explains the parallels between Glenn and the famous pianist Glenn Gould: the novel states that Glenn is named after a famous pianist, and Atwood has explained that Glenn has Asperger syndrome, which Gould is suspected to have also had.
- Oryx is a mysterious woman, recognized by Jimmy and Crake as the waif-like girl from a child pornography site. Crake hires her for sexual services and as a teacher to the Crakers, but she secretly becomes Jimmy's lover as well. After the catastrophe, her memory continues to haunt Snowman. Her name is from the oryx, an African antelope: "It's not even her real name, which he'd never known anyway; it's only a word. It's a mantra" (p. 110). She is described as likely originating from the South or South-East Asian region.
- Sharon is Jimmy's mother. She once worked at OrganInc, like her husband, but stopped due to an untreated nervous breakdown related to her opposition to the bio-corporations' business. She is depressed and often fights with Jimmy's father. Jimmy vies for his mother's attention, but she spends much of her time sitting in her bathrobe and smoking. Eventually, Sharon runs away from the HelthWyzer compound, abandoning her son and taking his treasured genetically engineered pet rakunk [a genetic splice between a raccoon and a skunk] named "Killer". She takes up with various underground opposition groups and is hunted by the deadly CorpSeCorps corporate security services. Jimmy is haunted by his mother's absence and is visited often by CorpSeCorps inspectors attempting to track her whereabouts.
- Jimmy's father, unnamed in the book, works first for OrganInc and later for HelthWyzer as a scientist. He is heavily involved in the development of pigoons (genetically engineered pigs that produce organs for human transplants). He is more pragmatic about the morality of genetic splicing than his wife. After Jimmy's mother deserts the compound, he pursues a relationship with his laboratory technician, Ramona, and they eventually marry.
- Ramona is one of Jimmy's father's lab technicians at OrganInc. Ramona, Jimmy, and Jimmy's father frequently go out to eat together. When Jimmy's father leaves OrganInc to accept a new position at HelthWyzer, Ramona makes the move with him. After Jimmy's mother's mysterious departure, Ramona moves in and takes on a motherly role in Jimmy's life.

== Beginnings ==
Margaret Atwood started writing the novel much earlier than she expected, while still on a book tour for her previous novel, The Blind Assassin. In March 2001, Atwood found herself in the Northern region of Australia, birdwatching with her partner during a break from the book tour. Here, while watching the red-necked crakes in their natural habitat, she was struck with inspiration for the story. However, Atwood explained that the work was also a product of her lingering thoughts on such a scenario throughout her life, as well as spending a great amount of time with scientists throughout her childhood. She stated

Several of my close relatives are scientists, and the main topic at the annual family Christmas dinner is likely to be intestinal parasites or sex hormones in mice, or, when that makes the non-scientists too queasy, the nature of the Universe.

Atwood continued to write the novel through the summer of 2001 while visiting the Arctic North, witnessing global warming's effect on the region. However, shaken by the September 11 attacks, she stopped writing for a few weeks in the autumn, saying, "It's deeply unsettling when you're writing about a fictional catastrophe and then a real one happens". However, with the looming questions of the end, Atwood finished the novel for release in 2003. These questions in Oryx and Crake, Atwood explained, are "simply, What if we continue down the road we're already on? How slippery is the slope? What are our saving graces? Who's got the will to stop us?"

== Allusions and references ==
=== To other works ===
The cover of some editions contains a portion of the left panel of Hieronymous Bosch's painting The Garden of Earthly Delights. The cover of other editions contains a modified portion of Lucas Cranach the Elder's painting The Fall.

The French translation of the title to "Le dernier homme" (The Last Man) is an allusion to Mary Shelley's work of the same name, both set in the apocalyptic genre as a plague results in the near-extinction of humanity.

In the first chapter, Snowman utters a reference from Kurt Vonnegut's Slaughterhouse Five:

"It is the strict adherence to daily routine that tends towards the maintenance of good morale and the preservation of sanity," he says out loud. He has the feeling he's quoting from a book, some obsolete, ponderous directive written in aid of European colonials running plantations of one kind or another.

One of Snowman's musings, "Now I'm alone [...] All, all alone. Alone on a wide, wide sea" is an allusion to part four of Samuel Taylor Coleridge's Rime of the Ancient Mariner.

In chapter 5 (subsection "Bottle") is "Out, out, brief candle" from Shakespeare's Macbeth.

Crake finds, as Hamlet does, that his father was probably killed by his mother and step father. Like Hamlet, he plots to avenge him.

=== To scientific history ===
The book alludes to green fluorescent protein multiple times. The Children of Crake are described having green eyes from a jellyfish protein, indicating that Crake used this gene in their creation. The inclusion of wild green rabbits was influenced by GFP Bunny (2000), a glowing-green rabbit named Alba created by artist Eduardo Kac and scientist Louis-Marie Houdebine with the gfp gene.

== Reception ==
The book received mostly favourable reviews in the press. The Daily Telegraph reported on reviews from several publications with a rating scale for the novel out of "Love It", "Pretty Good", "Ok", and "Rubbish": Daily Telegraph, Times, Independent, Sunday Times, and Literary Review reviews under "Love It" and Guardian, Spectator, and TLS reviews under "Pretty Good" and Sunday Telegraph and Observer reviews under "Ok".

The Globe and Mail, Maclean's, and the Toronto Star ranked the novel high among Atwood's works and Helen Brown, for the Daily Telegraph, wrote "The bioengineered apocalypse she imagines is impeccably researched and sickeningly possible: a direct consequence of short-term science outstripping long-term responsibility. And just like the post-nuclear totalitarian vision of The Handmaid's Tale, this story is set in a society readers will recognise as only a few steps ahead of our own." For The New Yorker, Lorrie Moore called the novel "towering and intrepid". Moore wrote, "Tonally, 'Oryx and Crake' is a roller-coaster ride. The book proceeds from terrifying grimness, through lonely mournfulness, until, midway, a morbid silliness begins sporadically to assert itself, like someone, exhausted by bad news, hysterically succumbing to giggles at a funeral." Joyce Carol Oates noted that the novel is "more ambitious and darkly prophetic" than The Handmaid's Tale. Oates called the work an "ambitiously concerned, skillfully executed performance".

Joan Smith, writing for The Observer, faulted the novel's uneven construction and lack of emotional depth. She concluded: "In the end, Oryx and Crake is a parable, an imaginative text for the anti-globalisation movement that does not quite work as a novel."

In a review of The Year of the Flood, Ursula K. Le Guin defended the novel against criticism of its characters by suggesting the novel experiments with components of morality plays.

On 5 November 2019, the BBC News listed Oryx and Crake on its list of the 100 most influential novels. The same year, The Guardian included it on their list of the 100 best books of the 21st century.

== Censorship in the United States ==
Oryx and Crake is one of the most-banned books by school officials in the United States. In 2023, it was banned from school libraries by the school boards of Willard, Missouri and Hanover County, Virginia. That same year, the Beaufort County, South Carolina school district banned the book but then reversed the decision and returned it to high school library shelves. Officials in Forsyth County, Georgia did not ban Oryx and Crake but did decide to require parental permission before a student could access it. In April 2024, it was banned in three large Texas school districts.

In August 2024, it was one of 13 books banned statewide by Utah's state board of education, allegedly for its "objective sensitive material."

== Sequels ==
The Year of the Flood was released on 7 September 2009 in the United Kingdom, and 22 September 2009 in Canada and the United States. Though chronicling a different set of characters, the follow-up expands upon and clarifies the relationships of Crake with Oryx and Jimmy with his high school girlfriend Ren. Glenn makes a brief appearance. It also identifies the three characters introduced at the end of the original, and finishes the cliffhanger ending.

The third book in the series, MaddAddam, was published in August 2013.

== Adaptation ==
In 2023, the Hessisches Staatstheater Wiesbaden premiered an opera based on the novel, composed by Søren Nils Eichberg, conducted by Albert Horne and directed by Daniela Kerck.

Darren Aronofsky's company Protozoa Pictures were developing a television adaptation of the entire MaddAddam trilogy, under the working title MaddAddam. Aronofsky was to serve as executive producer and possibly director, with the script written by playwright Eliza Clark. The project was formerly being developed for HBO; in 2016 Aronofsky said that the network was no longer attached, but confirmed that the scripts were written and the project was still underway. In January 2018, Paramount Television and Anonymous Content announced they had won the bidding war for rights to the trilogy and planned to bring the series to cable or video on demand. No network had yet agreed to carry the series.

== See also ==
- Human genetic engineering
- Transhumanism
- Biological weapons
- Shaking the Habitual (2013 album by The Knife)
