= Daniela Kerck =

German scenic designer and stage director)

- Education: Academy of Fine Arts Vienna; Hochschule für Musik Karlsruhe
- Occupations: Scenic designer; Stage director
- Notable work: Babylon; Oryx and Crake; Turandot
- Website: www.danielakerck.com

Daniela Kerck is a German scenic designer and stage director who has worked internationally. She directed and created the stage for Jörg Widmann's opera Babylon that opened the 2022 Internationale Maifestspiele Wiesbaden in 2022, and again for Puccini's Turandot for the 2024 festival. Her staging of the world premiere of Søren Nils Eichberg's Oryx and Crake was nominated for the 2023 International Opera Awards.

== Life and career ==
Kerck studied stage design at the Academy of Fine Arts Vienna with Erich Wonder. Her thesis was titled "Every Room is the Centre of the World". She worked as Wonder's assistant at the Zürich Opera House, the Berlin State Opera and the Bavarian State Opera, among others. She made scenic designs for the Schauspielhaus Wien, the Latvian National Opera, the Théâtre du Châtelet in Paris and the Teatro Zarzuela in Madrid. She recreated the scenic design by Wonder for Salome by Richard Strauss, directed by Luc Bondy, for a production at the Volksoper in Vienna in 2023 that had first been presented at the Salzburg Festival, later also at La Scala in Milan.

Kerck studied music theatre direction at the Hochschule für Musik Karlsruhe with Andrea Raabe and Stephan Mösch, and attended master classes with Peter Konwitschny and Tatjana Gürbaca. She worked as assistant director to Johannes Schaaf at the San Francisco War Memorial Opera and the Aalto Theatre in Essen. She directed Verdi's Aida at the Tiroler Festspiele in Erl in 2019.

She directed and created the scene for several performances at the Hessisches Staatstheater Wiesbaden, both plays and operas. She has worked regularly with costume designer Andrea Schmidt-Futterer and video artist Astrid Steiner. She staged in Wiesbaden Joshua Harmon's Admissions in 2021, the German premiere of the play, and The Minutes by Tracy Letts. She created Jörg Widmann's opera Babylon for the opening performance of 2022 Internationale Maifestspiele Wiesbaden, acknowledged by the press and the composer. She created Dvořák's Rusalka in collaboration with soprano Olesya Golovneva.

Kerck staged the world premiere of Søren Nils Eichberg's opera Oryx and Crake, based on the novel by Margaret Atwood, on 18 February 2023; it was nominated for the 2023 International Opera Awards. She directed and also created the scene for Puccini's Turandot for the 2024 Internationale Maifestspiele, conducted by Yoel Gamzou. When Puccini died in 1924, he had not yet set the happy ending of the libretto to music; Kerck decided to use none of the completions of Puccini's opera by others. She framed the exotic story around Turandot by scenes in Puccini's library, where he composes in the beginning at a grand piano, served by a housekeeper. Dressed in a white suit throughout the performance, he is identified with the Prince in the story, and the housekeeper with Líu who is active on stage for most of the time. In the end, when Liú has taken her life and the music by Puccini ends, the Puccini on stage receives a kiss of death from Turandot and dies on the piano bench, to Puccini's "Requiem" antiphon composed in 1905.
