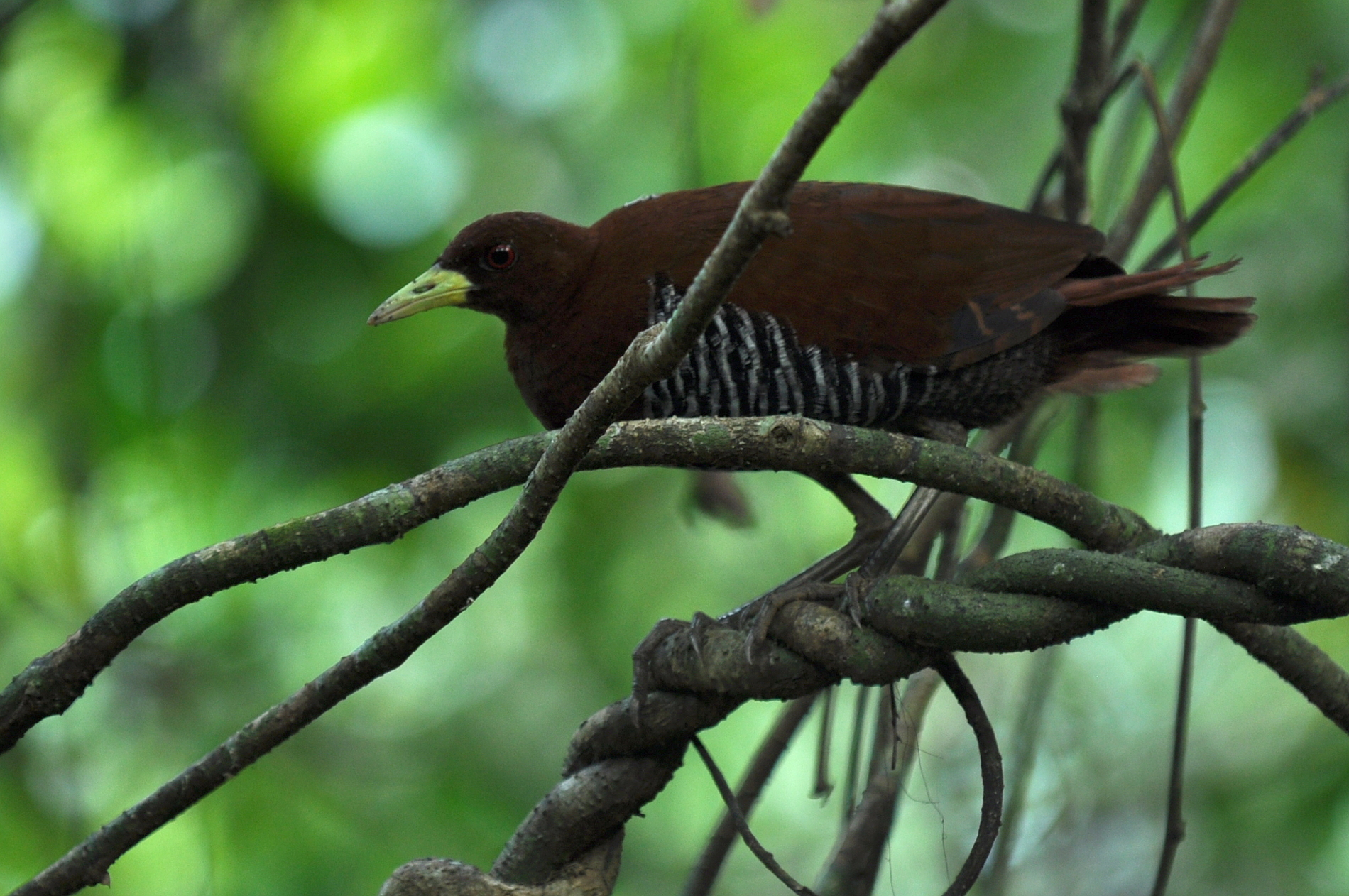

Conservation status
- Least Concern (IUCN 3.1)

Scientific classification
- Kingdom: Animalia
- Phylum: Chordata
- Class: Aves
- Order: Gruiformes
- Family: Rallidae
- Genus: Rallina
- Species: R. canningi

Binomial name
- Rallina canningi (Blyth, 1863)

= Andaman crake =

Species of bird

The Andaman crake (Rallina canningi) is a bird species in the family Rallidae. It is endemic to the Andaman Islands of the eastern Indian Ocean.

== Taxonomy and systematics ==
It was first described as the Andaman banded crake Euryzona canningi by Blyth in the 1863 issue of the journal, Ibis. Later, it was treated as Andamaneese banded crake Rallina canningi by Baker in 1929. Subsequently, Ripley and Ali retained Baker's scientific name for the species, while reverting to Blyth's common name.

== Description ==
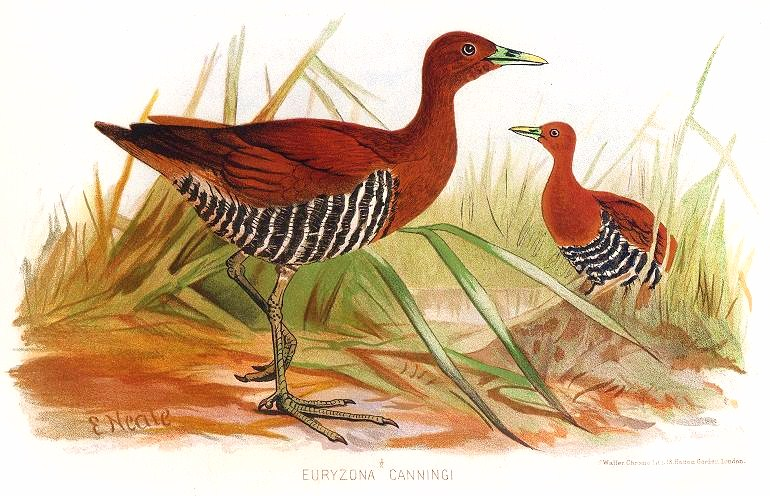
Andaman crake from a chromolithograph in The Game Birds of India, Burmah and Ceylon, published in 1890

This is the largest Rallina, measuring about 34 cm in length. It has a glossy chestnut plumage, extensive bold barring on underparts, unbarred undertail-coverts, relatively bright apple-green bill and relatively long and fluffy tail; legs and feet are olive-green. It also has pale barring on wings confined to outer primaries and greater and medium coverts. Juveniles are duller and less prominently barred. Other similar looking crakes include other Rallina and ruddy-breasted crake Porzana fusca. They are smaller and do not have green bill and legs. Immature birds are duller overall with the barred areas being dark grey-brown with a chestnut tinge, narrowly banded and streaked dirty white. Juvenile birds are paler than adult. Voice is a deep croak. It utters a sharp click as an alarm call.

== Distribution and habitat ==
Its natural habitat is marshland inside subtropical or tropical moist lowland forests, subtropical or tropical mangrove forests. It is threatened by habitat loss. It is known from North, Middle and South Andaman islands and may occur on other islands such as Great Coco or middle Coco Islands. It was formerly classified as data deficient by the IUCN, due to the lack of reliable information on its status. Later studies showed it to be fairly common in suitable habitat. Consequently, it has been listed at least concern status in 2017. BirdLife International estimates the population to range between 10,000 and 25,000 individuals.

== Behaviour and ecology ==
=== Breeding ===
It breeds between June and August. It nests at the bottom of large trees with buttresses or under tangled undergrowth in forests. In one study, the species preferred trees such as Terminalia, Tetrameles nudiflora or Pterocarpus, possibly near waterbodies. Its eggs are similar to those of the banded crake but larger, whiter and more glossy. Both sexes share in incubation. According to Baker, the eggs are about 40 by 30 mm (1.6 by 1.2 in).

=== Food and feeding ===
Much like other crakes, it feeds on small fish, molluscs, worms and insects (beetles, grasshoppers and caterpillars). Large grasshoppers shaken about and battered before swallowing.

=== Threats to survival ===
In the 1980s, the crake was considered to be quite common on the islands; over 80 birds were snared in a square mile. It is much rare now even though there are extensive forests in the islands. Introduced predators may also pose a risk to the birds' population.
