= Requiem (Puccini) =

1905 composition by G. Puccini

- Choral composition by Giacomo Puccini
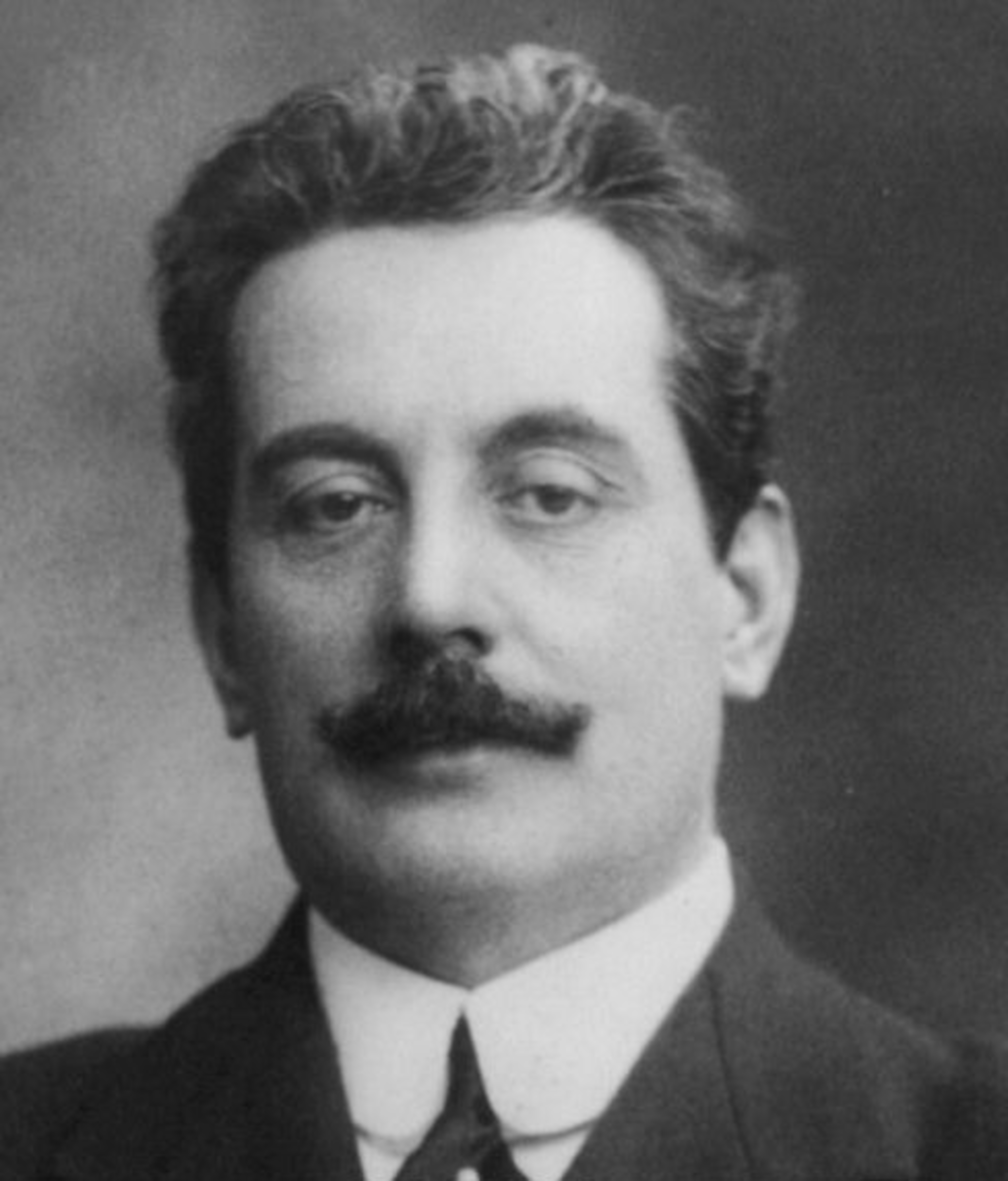
- Puccini in 1908
- Catalogue: SC 76
- Occasion: In memory of Giuseppe Verdi
- Text: Antiphon of the Requiem
- Language: Latin
- Performed: 27 January 1905
- Scoring: Choir; Viola; pump organ or pipe organ

"Requiem", SC 76, is a composition for choir, viola and pump organ or pipe organ that Giacomo Puccini wrote in 1905. Commissioned by his publisher, Puccini set the Latin antiphon of the Requiem mass on the occasion of the fourth anniversary of the death of Giuseppe Verdi.

== History ==
Puccini composed the work on a commission of his publisher Giulio Ricordi on the occasion of the forth anniversary of the death of Giuseppe Verdi. The autograph score is dated 14 January 1905, which is possible the day of composing. The work was first performed on 27 January 1905 by the choir of La Scala in Milan, conducted by Aristide Venturi, at the chapel of the Casa di Riposo per Musicisti that Verdi had founded.

The composition was also performed on 29 December 1924 at a memorial concert for Puccini at the Milan Conservatory, and again on his 50th anniversary of death on 30 November 1974. The music was first published in 1976 by Elkan & Vogel in New York City, followed by a 1990 edition in Italy. A critical edition was published in 2005 by Carus-Verlag in cooperation with the Fondazione Puccini and the Centro studi "G. Puccini" in Lucca, edited by Michele Girardi.

== Composition ==
The composition is score for a three-part mixed choir, (STB, with divided parts at times), a solo viola and pump organ or pipe organ. The duration is about four minutes.

The composition of 57 measures is in D minor and common time, marked Adagio sostenuto. It is in a ternary form, A B A'. The voices sing mostly in unison in the outer sections. In the middle section, the solo viola enters, and the divided voices respond to it; this feature reappears in a short coda.

The main theme begins as an upward scale in nine steps which are chromatic in the end. The musicologist Michele Girardi regarded this theme as an homage at the Enigmatic scale that Verdi had set in the Ave Maria from his Quattro pezzi sacri. The complex harmonies change with every step of the scale, creating tension. Puccini would use a similar technique in the chorus "Ombra dolente, non farci del male!" in his opera Turandot. The work ends with a plagal cadence, with the choir ending on the subdominant, while the organ returns to the tonic.

== Text ==
Requiem aeternam dona eis Domine
Et lux perpetua luceat eis.
Requiescat in pace.
Amen.
