= Lance Ryan =

Canadian operatic tenor (born 1971)

- Born: 1 May 1971 (age 55); White Rock, British Columbia
- Education: University of British Columbia
- Occupation: Classical operatic tenor
- Organizations: Badisches Staatstheater Karlsruhe; Hessisches Staatstheater Wiesbaden; Bayreuth Festival

Lance Ryan (born 1 May 1971) is a Canadian operatic tenor, who has worked from Germany since 2005. He is known for singing Siegfried in Wagner's Der Ring des Nibelungen, which he performed at opera houses in Europe including the Bayreuth Festival. He performed the title roles of Verdi's Otello and Britten's Peter Grimes.

== Career ==
Born in White Rock, British Columbia, Canada, Ryan played in a rock band when he went to school and decided early for a career as a musician. He first studied music history and classical guitar at the Douglas College in New Westminster, later at the University of British Columbia. He also began to train his voice there, which he continued in Europe, with the Italian tenors Gianni Raimondi and Carlo Bergonzi among others. He moved to Germany in 2005 and became a member of the Badisches Staatstheater Karlsruhe, singing roles such as Wagner's Siegmund in Die Walküre and Lohengrin, the Emperor in Die Frau ohne Schatten by Richard Strauss and Calaf in Puccini's Turandot. He appeared at the Hessisches Staatstheater Wiesbaden as the Emperor in Die Frau ohne Schatten.

Ryan performed at international festivals such as the Maggio Musicale Fiorentino and the Salzburg Festival. He was Siegfried at the Bayreuth Festival in 2010, 2013 and 2014, each time both in Siegfried and Götterdämmerung.

Ryan appeared internationally in major opera houses in Europe and in New York. He performed the part of Bacchus in Ariadne auf Naxos at the Metropolitan Opera. Ryan sang the title role of Énée in Berlioz's Les Troyens in 2010 (conducted by Valery Gergiev) at the Palau de les Arts Reina Sofia in Valencia and the title role of Verdi's Otello at the Oper Frankfurt in 2012, and Florestan in Beethoven's Fidelio at the Vienna State Opera. From 2013 he was Siegfried in the Ring production in Frankfurt, conducted by Sebastian Weigle. At the Cologne Opera appeared as Alvaro in Verdi's La forza del destino and Samson in Samson et Dalila by Camille Saint-Saëns. He performed the title role of Britten's Peter Grimes in Wiesbaden in 2017, conducted by Albert Horne. Staged by Philipp M. Krenn, he portrayed the outcast with bright, messerscharf (sharp like a knife) sounds.
