= Govinda Nagar =

Govinda Nagar Govind Nagar
- village
- Country: India
- State: Andaman and Nicobar Islands
- District: Nicobar
- Tehsil: Great Nicobar

Population (2011)
  - Total: 676
- Time zone: UTC+5:30 (IST)
- 2011 census code: 645199

Govinda Nagar is a village in the Nicobar district of Andaman and Nicobar Islands, India. It is located in the Great Nicobar tehsil. It was developed as a tsunami shelter to house people displaced by the 2004 Indian Ocean earthquake and tsunami.

In 2012, a new bird named "Great Nicobar Crake" belonging to the genus Rallina was discovered at the Govinda Nagar tsunami shelter by Zoological Survey of India scientists.

== Demographics ==
According to the 2011 census of India, Govinda Nagar has 194 households. The effective literacy rate (i.e. the literacy rate of population excluding children aged 6 and below) is 81.88%.

Demographics (2011 Census)
	Total	Male	Female
Population	676	385	291
Children aged below 6 years	69	34	35
Scheduled caste	0	0	0
Scheduled tribe	1	0	1
Literates	497	296	201
Workers (all)	305	249	56
Main workers (total)	211	185	26
Main workers: Cultivators	40	31	9
Main workers: Agricultural labourers	34	28	6
Main workers: Household industry workers	1	1	0
Main workers: Other	136	125	11
Marginal workers (total)	94	64	30
Marginal workers: Cultivators	0	0	0
Marginal workers: Agricultural labourers	1	0	1
Marginal workers: Household industry workers	0	0	0
Marginal workers: Others	93	64	29
Non-workers	371	136	235
