= Rebecca Eckler =

Canadian writer

Rebecca Eckler is a Canadian book publisher, former writer of columns and blogs about motherhood, and author of numerous books, including Knocked Up: Confessions of a Hip Mother-to-Be (2004), Wiped! Life with a Pint-Sized Dictator, (2007), and The Mommy Mob: Inside the Outrageous World of Mommy Blogging (2014). In 2022, she founded RE:books Publishing, a publisher for women authors.

== Career ==
=== As columnist and blogger ===
Eckler was employed by the National Post from 2000 to 2005. She was among a number of staff whose jobs were terminated by the CanWest newspaper chain. From March–December 2006, Eckler wrote "Mommy Blogger", a weekly freelance piece in The Globe and Mail, appending to this set of blogs a departing blog in May 2007. Eckler wrote blog posts that appeared occasionally in the Canadian periodical Maclean's from 2008 to 2016. Eckler's work also appeared in Mademoiselle.

=== As book author ===
Eckler became pregnant with her daughter, Rowan Joely, on the night of her engagement party and published the 2004 book Knocked Up: Confessions of a Hip Mother-to-Be about her first pregnancy. The book received negative reviews. In April 2007, Eckler published her second book, Wiped! Life with a Pint-Sized Dictator, which chronicles her first two years of motherhood. Quill & Quire said the book was a "series of tired clichés about parenthood." Eckler published Blissfully Blended Bullshit with Dundurn Press in 2019, on managing life with a blended family.

=== Publishing ===
Eckler founded RE:books, an independent publishing house featuring female authors, in 2022. Its debut title was the memoir I Married a Thrill-Seeker by Danielle Kaplan. She subsequently also founded Rivkah Books, an imprint specializing in books on Jewish themes, and is the co-founder with Chloe Faith Robinson of CANREADS, a book review and awards platform.

== Controversies ==
Eckler's writing has elicited controversy. For instance, there was international coverage of the responses to her blogging about her decision to leave her 10-month old infant to join her fiancé for the duration of a celebrity golf tournament in Mexico. Responses to her book and blog content have frequently included assessments of writing from privilege, shallowness and immaturity, and self-justification of non-traditional decisions.

== Personal life ==
Eckler's home was referenced in the April 2007 edition of Canadian House and Home. In 2007, Eckler participated in a charity auction for the magazine The Walrus, paying $7,000 for the right to have a character in Margaret Atwood's novel The Year of the Flood named after her.
