= Cape Town Opera =

Professional opera company in Cape Town, South Africa

Cape Town Opera (CTO) is a professional opera company in Cape Town, South Africa. CTO was founded in 1999 by the management and staff of the former South Africa Arts Council Opera and the Cape Performing Arts Board (CAPAB), itself a successor to the Cape Province Performing Arts Council and the previous Opera School at the South African College of Music at the University of Cape Town, which had been founded in the early 1920s under the Italian tenor Giuseppe Paganelli.

== Mission ==
The company produces many fully staged opera productions during an annual season at the Opera House of the Artscape Theatre Centre, the Joseph Stone Auditorium and approximately 15 other venues throughout South Africa. The company has established itself as South Africa's largest performing arts organisation and the only opera house in Africa with a year-round programme; alongside the classics, Cape Town Opera fosters the expression of a national identity through the creation and performance of new SA works such as Mandela Trilogy and Tsotsi, The Musical, based on Athol Fugard's novel. Cape Town Opera's calendar offers an exciting repertoire of opera, operetta and musicals.

== Training ==
Cape Town Opera maintains a training programme for young singers, the Voice of the Nation Studio. In addition to being coached in all opera disciplines and understudying and performing in comprimario roles, the singers undertake a 2-week tour once a year through the South African provinces to conduct workshops and perform reduced opera productions. The 2009 tour was subject of a one-hour documentary, Cape of Good Voice, by director Ralf Pleger for broadcasters Norddeutscher Rundfunk/Arte.

Cape Town Opera's Youth Development and Education department provides valuable musical training, free of charge, to more than 2 000 learners in rural and township communities each year.

== Tours ==
The company maintains an energetic touring schedule that includes Porgy and Bess, African Angels, Mandela Trilogy, African Prophetess and Showboat. In this way, Cape Town Opera serves as a cultural ambassador showcasing South Africa's singing talent to the rest of the world.

CTO regularly tours to Europe and has partnered with companies such as Sweden's NorrlandsOperan and Malmö Opera, and the Welsh National Opera. Notable international productions include performances for the opening of the Wales Millennium Centre in Cardiff, Puccini's Turandot with NorrlandsOperan, a 2005 European tour of Jerome Kern's and Oscar Hammerstein's Show Boat, and performances of Porgy and Bess with both the Welsh National Opera and NorrlandsOperan in 2006, and Deutsche Oper Berlin in 2008. In October 2009, the company brought Porgy and Bess to the Wales Millennium Centre, Royal Festival Hall and Edinburgh Festival Theatre; it toured six locations in the UK with 26 performances again in 2012 and featured in a concert performance under Simon Rattle in the final concert of the 2012 Musikfest Berlin, part of the Berliner Festspiele. In September 2012, the ensemble gave two concerts at Hamer Hall, Melbourne, Australia. One concert presented a selection of Verdi choruses and arias and works by Gershwin; in the other, the company performed David Fanshawe's African Sanctus and extracts from the Mandela Trilogy.

== Awards ==
The chorus of CTO, then directed by Albert Horne, was awarded the prize for the best opera chorus at the first International Opera Awards in London in May 2013. The Awards are sponsored by the London magazine, Opera.
