= The Year of the Flood =

2009 novel by Margaret Atwood

- First edition cover (Canada)
- Author: Margaret Atwood
- Cover artist: Maria Carella
- Language: English
- Genre: Speculative fiction
- Publisher: McClelland & Stewart (Canada); Bloomsbury Publishing (UK)
- Publication date: September 2009 (first edition, hardcover)
- Publication place: Canada
- Media type: Print (Hardcover and Paperback)
- Pages: 448 (first edition, hardcover)
- ISBN: 978-0-7475-8516-9 (first edition, hardcover)
- OCLC: 373481031
- Preceded by: Oryx and Crake
- Followed by: MaddAddam

The Year of the Flood is a novel by Canadian author Margaret Atwood, the second book of her dystopian trilogy, released on September 22, 2009, in Canada and the United States, and on September 7, 2009, in the United Kingdom. The novel was mentioned in numerous newspaper review articles looking forward to notable fiction of 2009.

The book focuses on a religious sect called God's Gardeners, a small community of survivors of the same biological catastrophe depicted in Atwood's earlier novel Oryx and Crake. The earlier novel contained several brief references to the group. The novel is told through the perspective of protagonists Ren and Toby, with the main characters of Oryx and Crake, including Jimmy and Crake having minor roles. Atwood continues to explore the effect of science and technology that has caused this plagued world, focusing on the theme of religion through the environmentally focused religious movement of God's Gardeners.

It answers some of the questions of Oryx and Crake, develops and further elaborates upon several of the characters in the first book, and reveals the identity of the three human figures who appear at the end of the earlier book. This is the second of Atwood's trilogy, with the final book being MaddAddam. Atwood, however, sees them as 'simultaneous' with the three novels all taking place at the same time and not in sequence.

== Plot ==
The Year of the Flood details the events of Oryx and Crake from the perspective of the lower classes in the pleeblands, specifically the God's Gardeners who live in a commune at the Edencliff Rooftop Garden. God's Gardeners are a religious sect that combines some Biblical practices and beliefs with some scientific practices and beliefs. They are vegetarians devoted to honoring and preserving all plant and animal life, and they predict a human species-ending disaster, which they call "The Waterless Flood". This prediction becomes true in a sense, as Crake's viral pandemic destroys human civilization. God's Gardeners have their own set of saints, all honoured for their environmental activism, such as Saint Dian Fossey and Saint Rachel Carson.

The plot follows two characters, Toby and Ren, whose stories intertwine with each other and, at points, with major characters from Oryx and Crake. Much of the story is told through flashbacks with the two main characters separately surviving the apocalypse described in the previous novel, each reminiscing about their time in God's Gardeners and the events that led to their current situations. Atwood uses third-person narration for Toby's accounts and first-person narration for Ren's.

Toby is a young woman who loses her parents under tragic circumstances that may or may not be due to the corporations and is forced to live off of the grid, working as a barista at SecretBurgers, a shady meat burger joint. She soon encounters the unwelcome attentions of Blanco, the psychopathic manager of the chain, who has a reputation for sexually assaulting and murdering the women in his employ. Toby is able to escape when a group of God's Gardeners arrive at the restaurant. She follows them to the rooftop garden, where she finds her former colleague Rebecca.

The leader of God's Gardeners, Adam One, is admired as a charismatic holy man within the group, but he is perceived by outsiders as a cult leader. The novel is filled with sermons and hymns Adam One gives to the religious sect. Although she is skeptical, finding it difficult to follow the theology and follow the religious traditions, Toby becomes an influential member of the gardeners. She even rises to the official position of an Eve. Within the sect Toby encounters Ren, a child member of the gardeners.

Ren joined the God's Gardeners when her mother, Lucerne, left her HelthWyzer scientist husband after falling in love with Zeb, a member of the sect. Ren grows up in the religious sect, befriending Amanda, until Lucerne decides to go back to the Compounds. Ren goes to school, where she meets Jimmy (Snowman) and Glenn (Crake), who is particularly interested in the God's Gardeners. Later, Ren enrolls in a Dance Calisthenics courses at the Martha Graham Academy, until Lucerne is unable to pay and she drops out. Eventually, Ren becomes a prostitute and trapeze dancer in the sex-club Scales and Tails, part of SeksMart. Here, Ren happens to be locked in a bio-containment unit in the club called the Sticky Zone when the pandemic occurs. Amanda rescues Ren from the club.

Blanco is able to find out where Toby is and raids the Gardeners. Toby manages to flee, and relocates to the AnooYoo spa. In fear, she changes her outward appearance through cosmetic surgery to hide from Blanco. Toby barricades herself in the luxury spa as the plague spreads, utilizing the skills of foraging she learned with the God's Gardeners to survive.

Blanco participates in the televised game Painball, where teams of criminals try to kill each other in the surrounded arena. Blanco and three companions escape the Painball forest to find Toby at the spa. They capture and torture Ren and Amanda. Toby is able to shoot one of the criminals and free Ren, but the others escape with Amanda. Both Toby and Ren come together to search for Amanda. Toby poisons Blanco, and she and Jimmy incapacitate the two criminals. The novel ends much like the ending of Oryx and Crake, with the remaining survivors witnessing an unknown group approach, carrying torches and playing music.

== Main characters ==
- Ren, a trapeze dancer and prostitute who works at the brothel Scales and Tails, who survives the plague by being isolated in the club's biohazard containment chamber. She had grown up with the God's Gardeners and is rescued by her childhood friend Amanda. She previously dated and fell in love with Jimmy (Snowman) in school.
- Toby, a God's Gardener who goes into hiding, escaping a dangerous stalker by working in a high-end spa, which she locks herself in to survive the plague.
- Blanco, known as the 'Bloat', is the manager of the SecretBurgers that Toby works at, where he attempts to force her into sexual slavery. He participates in Painball, as a condemned criminal, surviving the plague by staying in the enclosed arena. After this he tries to have his revenge against Toby, searching and abducting her.
- Adam One, the founder and leader of the God's Gardeners, giving sermons throughout the novel and cautioning the 'Waterless Flood'. Throughout, he professes the theological practices and beliefs of the religious sect, particularly in songs from 'The God's Gardeners Oral Hymnbook'.

== Minor characters ==
- Lucerne, mother of Ren. She leaves her husband, a HelthWyzer scientist, to join the God Gardeners and follow her lover Zeb.
- Amanda, best friend of Ren. Helps her escape the sex-club Scales and Tails, and is captured by the group of criminals including Blanco.
- Zeb, lover of Lucerne. He is the least committed to the creed of the God's Gardeners so becomes part of MaddAddam with other defectors like Crozier and Shackleton.
- Crake (aka Glenn), friend of Ren's at the high school in the HelthWyzer Compound. He is a friend of Pilar, staying in contact with the God's Gardeners. He is connected to and has much knowledge surrounding the religious sect. Whilst working at Scales and Tails, Ren meets him once again. The God's Gardeners inspire the Crakers, the humans that Crake makes, and his plague directly resembles the 'Waterless Flood'.
- Jimmy (aka Snowman), a lover of Ren's, during their time at school.
  Oryx, Crake (aka Glenn) and Jimmy (aka Snowman), the main characters of Atwood's first book in the series Oryx and Crake, appear in minor roles over the course of the book, with the protagonists Ren and Toby unaware that these characters are responsible for the pandemic. While the first book in the series, Oryx and Crake, is told from the perspective of Jimmy/Snowman, The Year of the Flood is told from the point of view of two women, Ren and Toby.

== God's Gardeners ==
- Pilar, Eve Six ("the Fungus") – Instructor: Bees and Mycology (Mushrooms)
- Nuala, Eve Nine ("the Wet Witch") – Seamstress; Instructor: Little kids, Fabric Recycling, Buds and Blooms Choir
- Rebecca, Eve Eleven (“the Salt and Peppler”) – Cook; Instructor: Culinary Arts
- Adam One – the charismatic leader of the cult
- Zeb, Adam Seven ("the Mad Adam") – Instructor: Urban Bloodshed Limitation, Predator-Prey Relationships, Animal Camouflage
- Burt, Adam Thirteen ("the Knob") – Bernice's father; Veena's husband; in charge of Garden Vegetables; Instructor: Wild and Garden Botanicals
- Bernice – Veena and Burt's daughter
- Shackleton (Shackie) – (oldest brother) – named after explorer Ernest Shackleton
- Crozier (Croze) – (middle brother) – named after explorer Francis Crozier
- Oates – (youngest brother) – named after explorer Lawrence Oates. He is murdered by Blanco following an ambush in Heritage Park at the end of the novel.
- Lucerne – Ren's mother
- Katuro (“the Wrench”) – Water Systems Maintenance; Instructor: Emergency Medical
- Philo (“the Fog”) – Shackleton, Crozier, and Oates’ stand-in father; Instructor: Meditation
- Surya – Instructor: Sewing
- Mugi (“the Muscle”) – Instructor: Mental Arithmetic
- Marushka Midwife (“the Mucous”) – Instructor: Human Reproductive System, former gynecologist
- Stuart (“the Screw”) – Furniture maker
- Veena – Bernice's mother; Burt's wife
- Amanda – Pleebrat that Ren brought home to live with her; Ren's best friend

== Themes ==
=== Science and technology ===
In this hyper-capitalist society, scientists work for and answer to the global corporations, creating products upon which the citizens become dependent. Any ethical concern or moral practice is disregarded, only considering the potential consumerist profits. Consumerism replaces any idealist principles. The advancement of technology has only further expanded the capitalist framework and materialistic attitudes within the class hierarchy. It is the developed cosmetic procedures which allow Toby to completely change her appearance, in order to hide from her stalker Blanco. This includes a 'Mo'hair' transplant.

In this way, nature is seen only as a means to exploit and profit from. Consequently, the entire ecosystem is corrupted, with many animal species rapidly becoming extinct. Instead of trying to reduce their environmental impact, scientists only continue experimenting on these animals. They keep on trying to splice animals together, creating a new animal through this mix between natural animals, such as the 'Liobam' (a blend of lion and sheep). Many of these new animals are formed and utilised for their by products, including a combination of goat and spider to yield silk bulletproof vests and 'Mo'Hairs', which are colourful sheep to make better, natural wigs. Science lacks any restraint in their pursuit of new commodities.

=== Religion ===
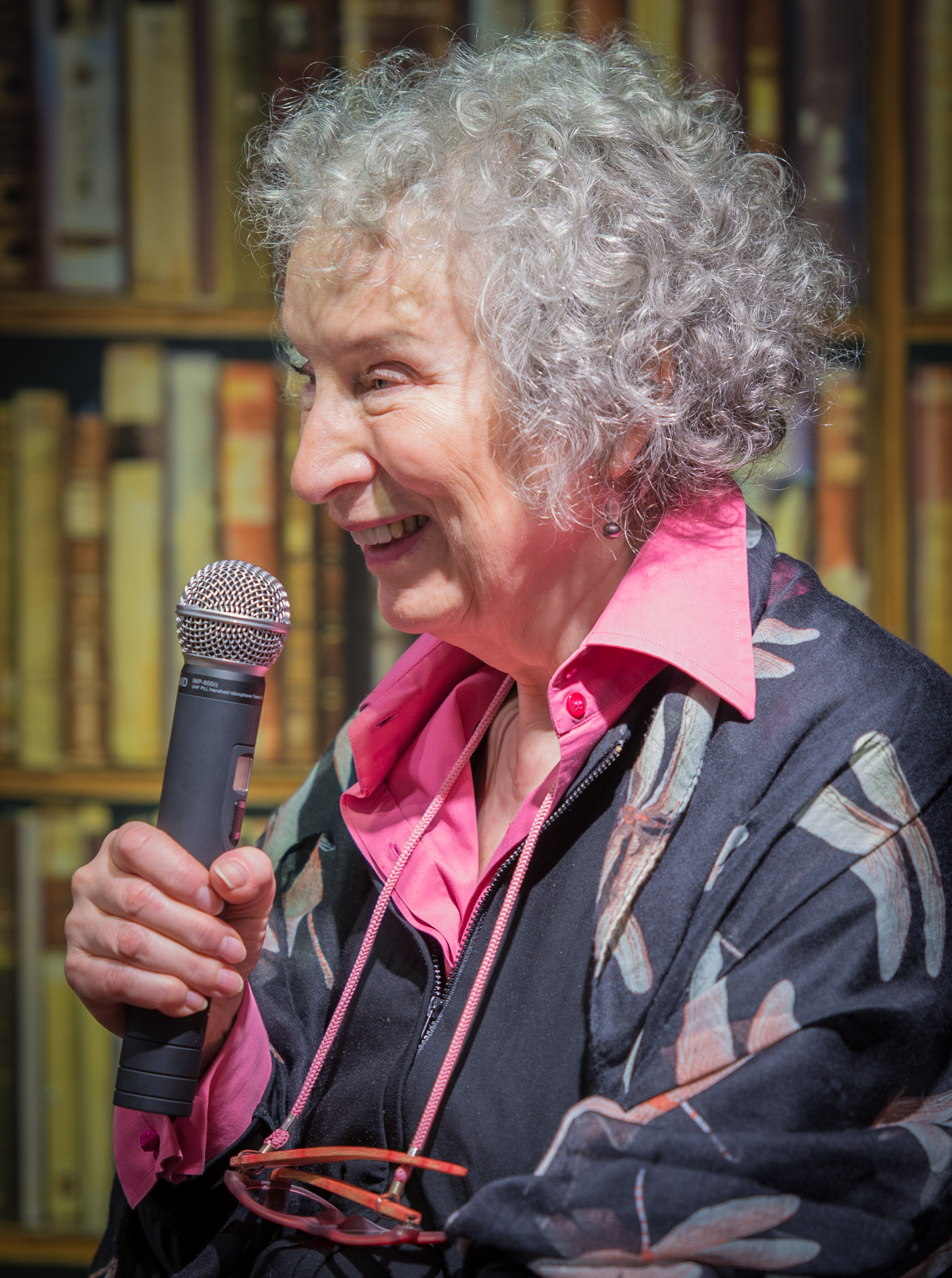
Margaret Atwood, author of the MaddAddam Trilogy

Using the primary religious sect of the God's Gardeners, Atwood presents an environmentally focused religious movement. Adam One, the religious leader, leads the God's Gardeners in a pacifist and greener life style. The novel is littered with his sermons and hymns, where the religious sect revere environmental activists in their own calendar of special saints, such as Saint Gibbons, Saint James Lovelock and Saint Jane Jacobs, amongst others. As a result, the Gardeners do not eat meat, having taken 'Vegivows', and are horrified by the carnivorous lifestyle.

== The MaddAddam Trilogy ==
The Year of the Flood is the second novel in the MaddAddam Trilogy, after Oryx and Crake and before MaddAddam. In this novel, the middle of trilogy, Atwood gives us more detail surrounding the childhood of Crake, highlighting his connection with the God's Gardeners that inspired his plague, and the conception of the MaddAddam group. The Year of the Flood uses alternative perspectives than that of Snowman in Oryx and Crake, though the character has a minor role. Atwood explains who the people that Snowman had seen at the conclusion of Oryx and Crake are, with it being Toby, Ren, Amanda and the criminals they incapacitate. At the end of The Year of the Flood these survivors, similar to the end of the previous novel, listen and see a passing group of people coming towards them, wondering who they could be.

== Promotion ==
Atwood's tour to promote the book included choral performances of 14 religious hymns that appear in the book. They were also released as a CD.

== Naming rights ==
For both Oryx and Crake and The Year of the Flood, Atwood donated naming rights to characters in the novel to charity auctions. One of the winning bidders was journalist Rebecca Eckler, who paid $7,000 at a benefit for the magazine The Walrus. "Amanda Payne" and "Saint Allan Sparrow" were also named by auction winners.

== Reception ==
The novel was generally well-received; reviewers noted that while the plot was sometimes chaotic, the novel's imperfections meshed well with the flawed reality the book was trying to reflect. The Daily Telegraph commented that "Margaret Atwood is genuinely inventive, rather than merely clever".

In 2010, the novel was longlisted as a candidate for the 2011 International Dublin Literary Award; it was also shortlisted for the 2010 Trillium Book Award.

The novel was selected for inclusion in the 2014 edition of CBC Radio's Canada Reads, where it was defended by Stephen Lewis.

The novel was banned by Orange County Public Schools in Florida at the start of the 2023-2024 school year. Orange County cited the new Florida education law, Florida HB 1069, which aims to restrict books with "sexual content" from being marketed to students of an unsuitable grade level or age group.

The book was permanently banned from libraries and schools in Conroe Independent School District, Texas, and Canyons School District, Utah. It was temporarily banned in Escambia County Public Schools, Florida pending investigation.

== See also ==
- Doomsday cult
