= Olesya Golovneva =

Russian soprano (born 1990)

- Education: University of Music and Performing Arts Vienna
- Occupation: Operatic soprano
- Website: olesya-golovneva.com/biography

Olesya Golovneva is a Russian operatic soprano who made a career mostly in Europe, first at Austrian and German opera houses, in roles such as Donizetti's Anna Bolena, Tatjana in Tchaikovsky's Eugene Onegin, Verdi's Luisa Miller and Puccini's Turandot.

== Career ==
Golovneva was born in Pskov. She studied in Saint Petersburg and at the University of Music and Performing Arts Vienna with Robert Holl in the class for Lied and oratorio, graduating with distinction. She was a recipient of the N. Rimskyj-Korsakow competition and the International Vocal Competition 's-Hertogenbosch.

She made her debut as a member of the ensemble of the Vienna State Opera, as the Queen of the Night in Mozart's Die Zauberflöte. She appeared as Tatjana in Tchaikovsky's Eugene Onegin in Hamburg, the Finnish National Opera in Helsinki, in Cologne and Wiesbaden. She has been a regular singer of the Deutsche Oper am Rhein, where she appeared as Mozart's Donna Anna in Don Giovanni, Donizetti's Maria Stuarda, and in Verdi roles: Gilda in Rigoletto, Elisabetta in Don Carlos, Luisa Miller and La traviata. She has appeared regularly at the Cologne Opera, where she performed as Natascha in Prokofiev's War and Peace (opera), Donizetti's Anna Bolena and Lucia di Lammermoor, Tatjana and Vitellia in Mozart's La clemenza di Tito. She made her debut at the Oper Malmö Opera as Luisa Miller, and her debut at the Opéra de Marseille as Amelia in Simon Boccanegra. She appeared at the Oper Frankfurt as Mimi in Puccini's La bohème, Rusalka and Elisabetta and Desdemona in Verdi's Otelloalongside Roberto Saccà.

She first appeared as Puccini's Turandot at the 2024 Internationale Maifestspiele Wiesbaden, conducted by Yoel Gamzou and with stage direction and scenic design by Daniela Kerck. She performed as Janace's Káťa Kabanová at the Staatsoper Hamburg, and as Valentine in Meyerbeer's Les Huguenots alongside Juan Diego Flórez. She portrayed the three leading soprano roles in Puccini's Il trittico there. She was the soprano in a ballet version of Verdi's Requiem by Christian Spuck at the Deutsche Oper Berlin. She performed as Dvořák`'s Rusalka at both the Teatro Real in Madrid and the Palau de les Arts Reina Sofía. She made her debut as a director with the same opera in Wiesbaden.

In concert, Golovneva sang Rachmaninov's The Bells at the Konzerthaus Dortmund, Beethoven's Ninth Symphony in Lausanne, and Dvořáks Te Deum in Utrecht and Amsterdam.

Golovneva was chosen as best singer of the year for portraying Anna Bolena and Luisa Miller. Her interpretation of Rusalka at the Cologne Opera was nominated for the Faust award.

She recorded Tchaikovsky's Iolanta conducted by Dmitri Kitayenko, and Luisa Miller and La bohème as a DVD.
