= MaddAddam =

2013 novel by Margaret Atwood

- First edition cover (Canada)
- Author: Margaret Atwood
- Cover artist: Michael J Windsor
- Language: English
- Genre: Speculative fiction
- Publisher: McClelland & Stewart (Canada); Bloomsbury Publishing (UK)
- Publication date: 27 August 2013 (Canada)
- Publication place: Canada
- Media type: Print (Hardcover and Paperback)
- Pages: 416 (first edition, hardcover)
- ISBN: 0-77100-846-5 (first edition, Canada)
- OCLC: 829950166
- Preceded by: The Year of the Flood

MaddAddam is a novel by Canadian writer Margaret Atwood, published on 29 August 2013.

MaddAddam concludes the dystopian trilogy that began with Oryx and Crake (2003) and continued with The Year of the Flood (2009). While the plots of these previous novels ran along a parallel timeline, MaddAddam is the continuation of both books. MaddAddam is written from the perspective of Zeb and Toby, who were both introduced in The Year of the Flood.

== Plot ==
The novel continues the story of some of the same characters in the wake of the same biological catastrophe depicted in Atwood's earlier novels in the trilogy. The narrative starts with Ren and Toby (protagonists in The Year of the Flood) rescuing another survivor (Amanda Payne) from two criminals, who had been previously emotionally hardened by a colosseum-style game called Painball. Ren and Toby meet up with Jimmy, the protagonist from Oryx and Crake. These characters reunite with other survivors, develop a camp and start to rebuild civilization with the Crakers, all while the vengeful criminals (Painballers) stalk them.

Similarly to the previous two books, the narrative switches periodically into the past. After Zeb and Toby become lovers, he tells her about his previous career. Zeb and Adam One (from The Year of the Flood) grew up as half-brothers. Their father, a preacher ("The Rev"), advocated a corporate-friendly message that espoused petroleum and shunned environmentalism. Disgusted by his father's ethics and hypocrisy, Zeb hacks into his father's accounts and empties them. Knowing their father's political influence, Zeb and Adam leave home, take on different identities and separate in order to avoid detection. Ultimately, Zeb and Adam re-unite; they work together in building God's Gardeners, the central organization in The Year of the Flood.

== Critical reception ==
Andrew Sean Greer said in The New York Times, "Atwood has brought the previous two books together in a fitting and joyous conclusion that's an epic not only of an imagined future but of our own past".

James Kidd of The Independent said, "Atwood's body of work will last precisely because she has told us about ourselves. It is not always a pretty picture, but it is true for all that."

== See also ==
- Biological hybrid
- Human-animal communication
