= Oryx and Crake (opera) =

2023 opera composed by Søren Nils Eichberg

Oryx and Crake is an opera by the Danish-German composer Søren Nils Eichberg and German librettist Hannah Dübgen that premiered in 2023. It is based on the novel Oryx and Crake by Margaret Atwood and is about a boy who is subjected to experiments in genetic engineering. The story is told in flashbacks from a post-apocalyptic future where the boy has become the last surviving human.

The opera premiered on 18 February 2023 at the Hessisches Staatstheater Wiesbaden. It was conducted by Albert Horne, directed by Daniela Kerck, featured video projections by Astrid Steiner and starred Benjamin Russell, Samuel Levine, Joel Stambke, Anastasiya Taratorkina, Christopher Bolduc and Fleuranna Brockway. The playing time was 100 minutes. The opera was nominated in the category "World Premiere" at the 2023 International Opera Awards.
