= Luisa Miller =

Opera by Giuseppe Verdi

- Opera by Giuseppe Verdi
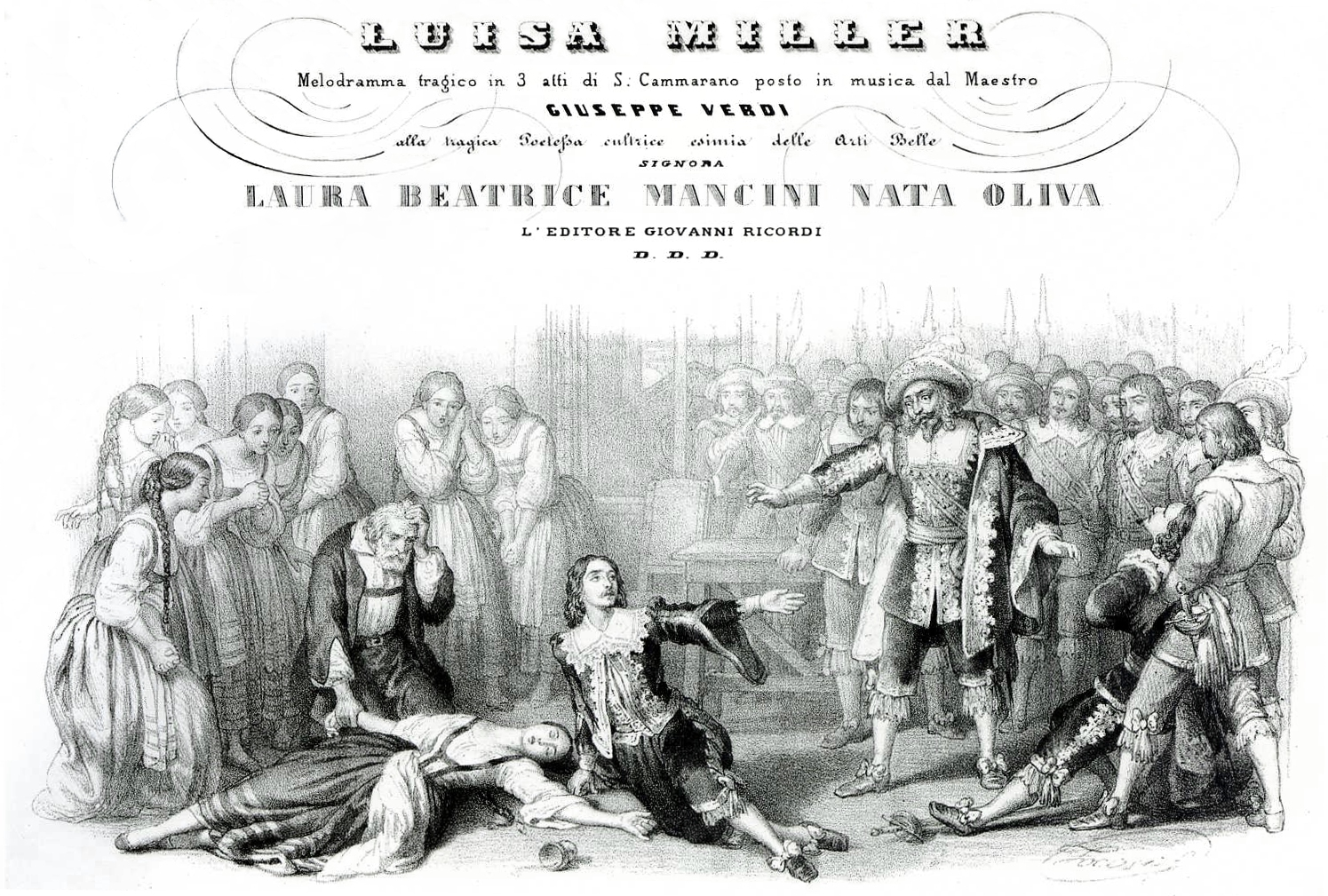
- The death of Luisa from the first edition vocal score
- Librettist: Salvadore Cammarano
- Language: Italian
- Based on: Kabale und Liebe (Intrigue and Love) by Friedrich von Schiller
- Premiere: 8 December 1849; Teatro San Carlo, Naples

Overture
Played in 1993 by the United States Marine Band (5:52)

Luisa Miller is an opera in three acts by Giuseppe Verdi to an Italian libretto by Salvadore Cammarano, based on the play Kabale und Liebe (Intrigue and Love) by the German dramatist Friedrich von Schiller.

Verdi's initial idea for a new opera – for which he had a contract going back over several years – was rejected by the Teatro San Carlo in Naples. He attempted to negotiate his way out of this obligation and, when that failed, Cammarano came up with the idea of adapting the Schiller play, with which Verdi was familiar. The process was set in motion, with Verdi still living and working on initial ideas from Paris, where he had been living for almost two years before moving back to his home town of Busseto in the summer of 1849. It was from there that he wrote the music and traveled to Naples for rehearsals. The first performance was given on 8 December 1849.

This was Verdi's 15th opera (counting Jérusalem, the French translation and revision of I Lombardi alla prima crociata), and it is regarded as the beginning of the composer's "middle period".

== Composition history ==
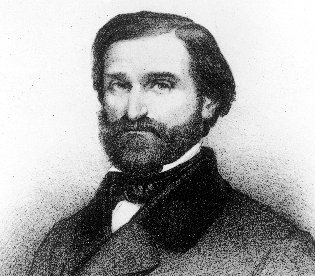
Verdi around 1850

In August 1848, Verdi had written to the Naples opera house cancelling his contract of three years previous, in which he had agreed to write an opera for them. However, the management held him to it by threatening his librettist for failing to provide a libretto, and Verdi relented, encouraging Cammarano to develop "a brief drama with plenty of interest, action and above all feeling – which would make it easier to set to music".

In Verdi's mind, he had the perfect subject, to be based on the novel L'assedio di Firenze ("The Siege of Florence") by Francesco Domenico Guerrazzi, which glorified the life of the 16th-century Florentine soldier Francesco Ferruccio. This new subject was also a patriotic piece: Verdi had taken to heart the admonitions of the poet Giuseppe Giusti, who had pleaded with him after Macbeth and after Milan's political turmoil of March 1848 and its aftermath to "do what you can to nourish the [sorrow of the Italian people], to strengthen it, and direct it to its goal".

Attempting to get a new libretto underway, Verdi approached Francesco Maria Piave, found him engaged as a soldier for the new Venetian republic, and so contacted Cammarano in Naples with the idea of L'assedio. But, as it turned out, Cammarano had to tell Verdi that the Naples censors rejected the outline of a subject which had interested Verdi very much since the time he prepared his previous opera, La battaglia di Legnano. His inability to continue to develop the project came as a blow. Verdi's biographer Julian Budden notes that "next to Re Lear (King Lear), this was to be the most fascinating of Verdi unrealized subjects"; another biographer Mary Jane Phillips-Matz adds that she regards L'assedio di Firenze as "one of Verdi's most important uncomposed works."

Cammarano advised the composer to avoid a story which had any sort of revolutionary tinge, and he came back with an idea which Verdi himself had once proposed in 1846 when he was recovering from his illness and in the company of Andrea Maffei (who was writing the libretto for I masnadieri): to adapt Schiller's Kabale und Liebe. Therefore, he sent a synopsis of Luisa Miller (which he called Eloisa Miller) to Verdi on 14 May 1849.

Verdi's reply to Cammarano on 17 May outlines some of his concerns; these revolved around the shift of some elements (especially in act 2) and the addition of a duet for Walter and Wurm. As Budden notes, "the only one of these points on which Verdi got his way was the new duet" (because the librettist raised various objections regarding the conditions at the San Carlo and various others), but Budden emphasizes the "spirit of give and take" which prevailed through their relationship. One example regarded the ending of act 1 where Verdi emphasized that there should no stretta, and the librettist agreed provided that "the act did not end in slow tempo but should quicken towards an animated finish."(See "Music" below).

Cammarano moved the action from a princely court (in the 18th century) to a Tyrolean village (in the 17th century), and shifted the characters away from the princely intrigues which preoccupied Schiller. He therefore moved the focus much more toward the "Liebe" (Love) and away from the "Kabale" (Intrigue) aspects of the play.

With the idea of Luisa Miller agreed upon, from Paris Verdi approached the Naples management, trying to obtain a delay or, at least, to allow the new opera to be presented in his absence. When this approach was rejected, the composer made plans for both himself and his companion Giuseppina Strepponi to leave Paris; Verdi went to his native Busseto, arriving about 10 August, and took up residence in the Palazzo Orlandi (also referred to as the Palazzo Cavalli, after its architect) which he had bought in 1845; Strepponi joined him there a month later, for what was to be a difficult period in both their lives.

It was from Busseto that Verdi then began work on the score of this opera, having received the libretto from Cammarano on 13 August. In October he left for Naples, accompanied by Antonio Barezzi, whom he continued to refer to as his "father-in-law".

=== Distinctive elements of the libretto ===
When music writer Charles Osborne describes the libretto as "inadequate as an adaptation of Schiller's excellent play [but] Cammarano's Luisa Miller is, in its own right, a very fine libretto", he continues by comparing it with Cammarano's previous libretto for La battaglia di Legnano, which contrasts:

the domesticity of the story as opposed to the larger, public nature of the earlier opera. Verdi's Luisa Miller, his first attempt at portraying something of bourgeois "respectability" on the stage, is a direct predecessor of La traviata, which deals, amongst other things, with bourgeois hypocrisy.

Baldini makes a similar point when he comments in his 1970 book The Story of Giuseppe Verdi that the opera "is in every sense a bourgeois tragedy [and] it feeds on the extraordinary fascination we have for everyday violent crimes. Nothing so far written by Verdi comes close to the concept of realism" and he also comments on the essentially "private" nature of the opera; before Luisa, "something had always been raging, striving beyond the limits of private interests".

== Performance history ==
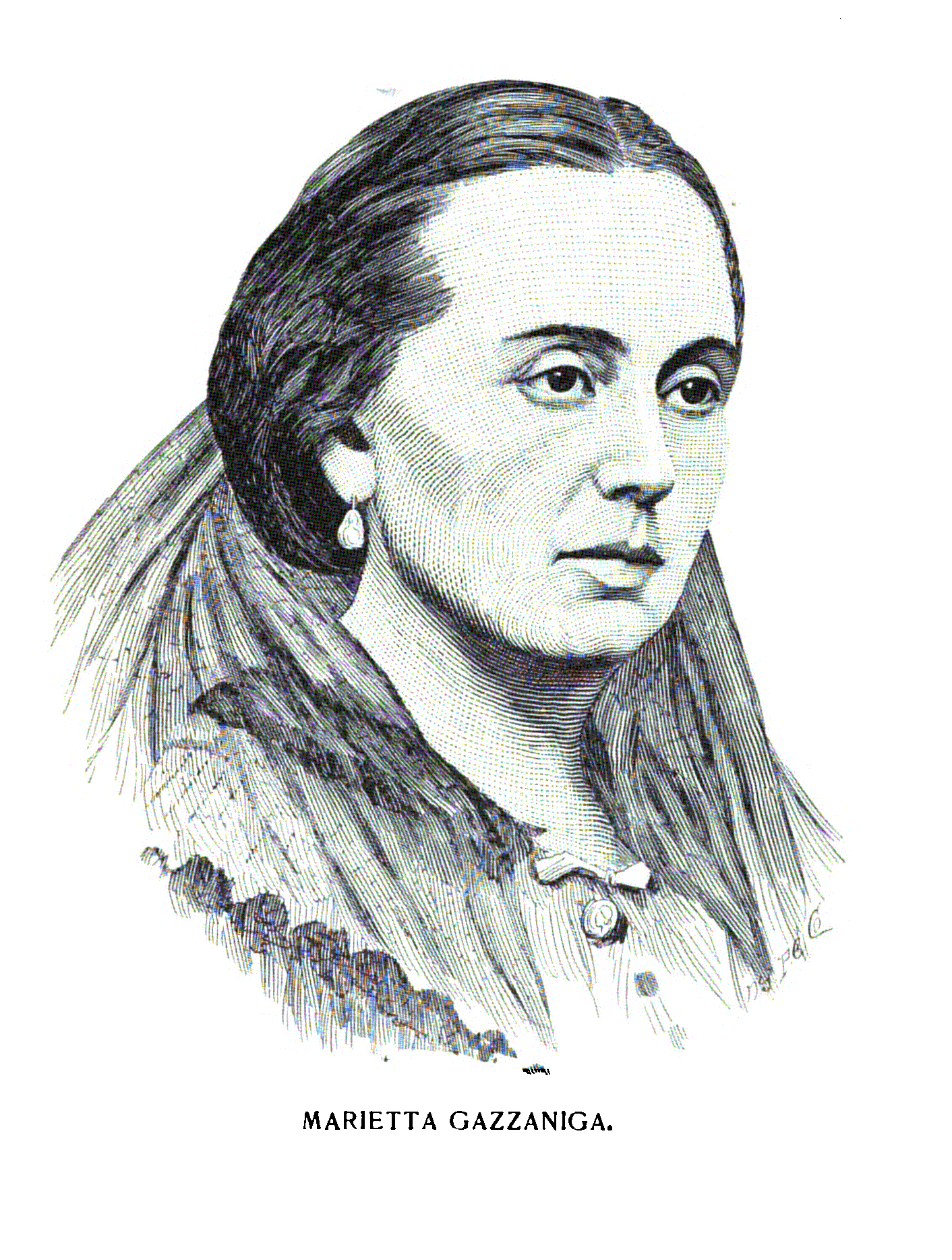
Marietta Gazzaniga, the original Luisa

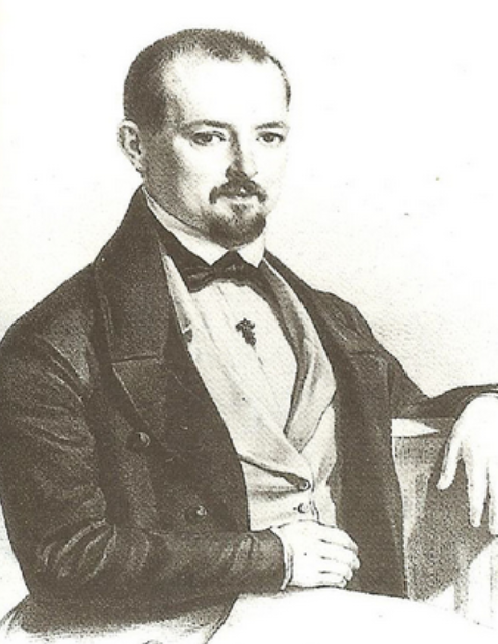
Settimeo Malvezzi, the original Rodolfo

=== 19th century ===
The premiere, on 8 December 1849, was well received, although for Verdi, the experience of dealing with the authorities at the San Carlo Opera in Naples caused him to vow never to produce another opera there. In fact, he never did, in spite of having initially written Un ballo in maschera for that house.

In Italy following the premiere, Luisa was given in Rome in 1850 and in Venice, Florence and Milan again up to 1852. The US premiere was staged by the Caroline Richings Company at the Walnut Street Theatre in Philadelphia on 27 October 1852 with Caroline Richings in the title role. This was followed on 3 June 1858 by the first UK presentation at Her Majesty's Theatre in London.

=== 20th century and beyond ===
While not as popular as the most often performed of Verdi's works such as Rigoletto, La Traviata or Aida, Luisa Miller is fairly often seen on the stages of the world's opera houses.

Following its initial six performances during the 1929/30 season at the Metropolitan Opera in New York, the opera was not given there again until 1968 under Thomas Schippers. The Luisa was Montserrat Caballé, the Rodolfo Richard Tucker, the Miller Sherrill Milnes, the Walter Giorgio Tozzi, and the Wurm Ezio Flagello. The Met has revived the work numerous times since then.

Notable revivals include those featuring Caballé at the Gran Teatre del Liceu in January 1972 and at the Teatro alla Scala in May 1976. Katia Ricciarelli sang the title role along with Luciano Pavarotti several times in those years, particularly in San Francisco and again in Turin along with José Carreras. In 1978 the opera was presented at the Royal Opera House, Covent Garden, also with Ricciarelli in the title role. Luciano Pavarotti sang the role of Rodolfo in the original run; later seasons saw Ricciarelli reprising the title role with tenor José Carreras, followed by Plácido Domingo and then Carlo Bergonzi

Three opera companies, which plan to present all of Verdi's operas, have given this opera: the Sarasota Opera in 1999 as part of its "Verdi Cycle"; the Teatro Regio di Parma in October 2007 as part of their ongoing "Festival Verdi"; and the ABAO in Bilbao, Spain, in 2012 as part of its "Viva Verdi" series. The Paris Opéra at the Bastille Opera presented the work with Ana Maria Martinez and Ramón Vargas as Luisa and Rodolfo respectively on 8 March 2008.

In April–May 2010, a new production of the Zurich Opera House included Barbara Frittoli as Luisa, Fabio Armiliato as Rodolfo and Leo Nucci as Miller. In 2012, productions were seen in three German cities including Berlin, Stuttgart, and Munich, as well as Malmo in Sweden. In 2013, the opera was presented by the Israeli Opera company in Tel Aviv, by the Deutsche Oper am Rhein in Duisburg and Düsseldorf, and in Budapest. The San Francisco Opera opened their 93rd season in September 2015 by performing the opera.

== Roles ==
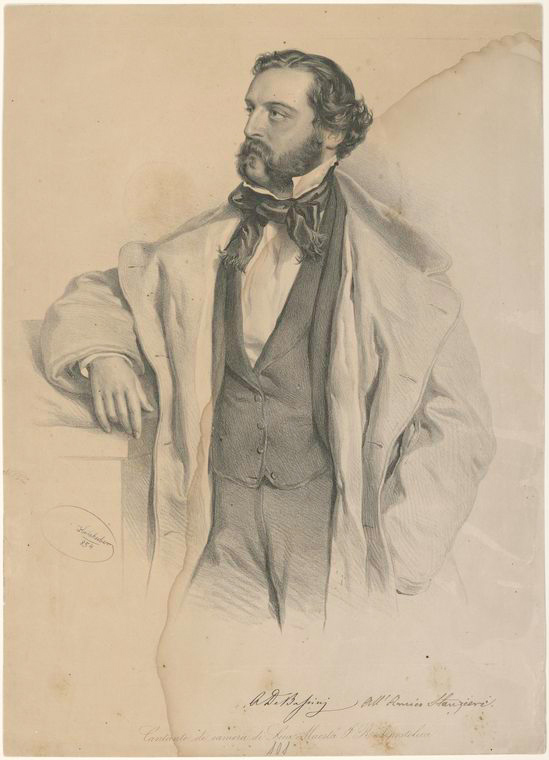
Achille De Bassini; Lithograph by Josef Kriehuber, 1854

Role	Voice type	Premiere Cast, 8 December 1849 (Conductor: - )
Miller, a retired soldier	baritone	Achille De Bassini
Luisa, his daughter	soprano	Marietta Gazzaniga
Count Walter	bass	Antonio Selva
Rodolfo, his son	tenor	Settimio Malvezzi
Federica, Duchess of Ostheim, Walter's niece	contralto	Teresa Salandri
Wurm, Walter's steward	bass	Marco Arati
Laura, a village girl	mezzo-soprano	Maria Salvetti
A peasant	tenor	Francesco Rossi
Damigelle di Federica, Paggi, Famigliari, Arcieri, Abitanti del villaggio

== Synopsis ==
Time: Early 17th Century
Place: The Tyrol

=== Act 1 ===
Scene 1: A village

On Luisa's birthday, the villagers have gathered outside her house to serenade her. She loves Carlo, a young man she has met in the village (Lo vidi e 'l primo palpito /"I saw him and my heart felt its first thrill of love") and looks for him in the crowd. Luisa's father, Miller, is worried by this mysterious love since Carlo is a stranger. Carlo appears and the couple sing of their love (Duet: t'amo d'amor ch'esprimere / "I love you with a love that words can only express badly"). As the villagers leave to enter the nearby church, Miller is approached by a courtier, Wurm, who is in love with Luisa, wishes to marry her, and previously attained permission to marry Luisa from Miller. But Miller tells him that he had agreed to give his blessing but she had to agree to the marriage herself and Miller will never make a decision against his daughter's will (Sacra la scelta è d'un consorte / "The choice of a husband is sacred"). Irritated by his reply, Wurm reveals to Miller that in reality Carlo is Rodolfo, Count Walter's son. Alone, Miller expresses his anger (Ah fu giusto il mio sospetto / "Ah! My suspicion was correct").

Scene 2: Count Walter's castle

Wurm informs the Count of Rodolfo's love for Luisa and is ordered to summon the son. The Count expresses his frustration with his son (Il mio sangue la vita darei / "I would give my life's blood"). When Rodolfo enters, Count Walter tells him that it is intended that he marry Walter's niece Federica, the Duchess of Ostheim.

When Rodolfo is left alone with Federica, he confesses that he loves another woman, hoping that the duchess will understand. But Federica is too much in love with him to understand (Duet: Duchessa! Duchessa tu m'appelli! / "Duchessa! Duchessa you call me!").

Scene 3: Miller's house

Miller tells his daughter who Rodolfo really is. Rodolfo arrives and admits his deception but swears that his love is sincere. Kneeling in front of Miller he declares that Luisa is his bride. Count Walter enters and confronts his son. Drawing his sword, Miller defends his daughter and Walter orders that both father and daughter be arrested. Rodolfo stands up against his father and threatens him: if he does not free the girl, Rodolfo will reveal how Walter became count. Frightened, Walter orders Luisa to be freed.

=== Act 2 ===
Scene 1: A room in Miller's home

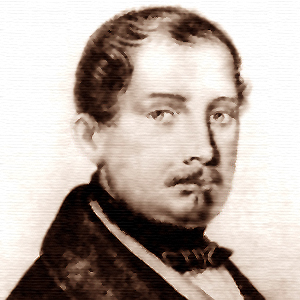
Salvadore Cammarano, librettist of the opera

Villagers come to Luisa and tell her that her father has been seen being dragged away in chains. Then Wurm arrives and confirms that Miller is to be executed. But he offers her a bargain: her father's freedom in exchange for a letter in which Luisa declares her love for Wurm and states that she has tricked Rodolfo. Initially resisting (Tu puniscimi, O Signore / "Punish me, o Lord"), she gives way and writes the letter at the same time being warned that she must keep up the pretense of voluntarily writing the letter and being in love with Wurm. Cursing him (A brani, a brani, o perfido / "O perfidious wretch"), Luisa wants only to die.

Scene:2: A room in Count Walter's castle

At the castle Walter and Wurm recall how the Count rose to power by killing his own cousin and Wurm reminds the Count how Rodolfo also knows of this. The two men realize that, unless they act together, they may be doomed (Duet: L'alto retaggio non ho bramato / "The noble inheritance of my cousin"). Duchess Federica and Luisa enter. The girl confirms the contents of her letter.

Scene 3: Rodolfo's rooms

Rodolfo reads Luisa's letter and, ordering a servant to summon Wurm, he laments the happy times which he spent with Luisa (Quando le sere al placido / "When at eventide, in the tranquil glimmer of a starry sky"). The young man has challenged Wurm to a duel. To avoid the confrontation the courtier fires his pistol in the air, bringing the Count and his servants running in. Count Walter advises Rodolfo to revenge the offense he has suffered by marrying Duchess Federica. In despair, Rodolfo abandons himself to fate (L'ara o l'avello apprestami / "Prepare the altar or the grave for me").

=== Act 3 ===
A room in Miller's home

In the distance echoes of the celebration of Rodolfo and Federica's wedding can be heard. Old Miller, freed from prison, comes back home. He enters his house and embraces his daughter, then reads the letter she has prepared for Rodolfo. Luisa is determined to take her own life (La tomba è un letto sparso di fiori / "The grave is a bed strewn with flowers"), but Miller manages to persuade her to stay with him. (Duet: La figlia, vedi, pentita / "Your child, see, repentant"). Alone now, Luisa continues praying. Rodolfo slips in and unseen pours poison into the water jug on the table. He then asks Luisa if she really wrote the letter in which she declared her love for Wurm. "Yes," the girl replies. Rodolfo drinks a glass of water and passes a glass to Luisa, inviting her to drink. Then he tells her that they are both condemned to die. Before she dies, Luisa has time to tell Rodolfo the truth about the letter (Duet: Ah piangi; il tuo dolore / "Weep; your sorrow is more justified"). Miller returns and comforts his dying daughter; together the three say their prayers and farewells (Trio, Luisa: Padre, ricevi l'estremo addio / "Father, receive my last farewell"; Rodolfo: Ah! tu perdona il fallo mio / "Oh, forgive my sin"; Miller: O figlia, o vita del cor paterno / "Oh, child, life of your father's heart"). As Luisa dies, the peasants enter with Count Walter and Wurm. Rodolfo runs his sword through Wurm's breast, declaring to his father La pena tua mira / "Look on your punishment" before he dies.

== Orchestration ==
Luisa Miller is scored for piccolo, two flutes, two oboes, 2 clarinets, two bassoons, four horns, four offstage horns, two trumpets, three trombones, one cimbasso, one harp, timpani, a bell representing a church bell, a bell representing the castle clock, bass drum and cymbals, organ and strings.

== Music ==
Julian Budden provides a summary of the strengths of this opera and demonstrates how it takes on many new dimensions based on several things: the relatively longer time-frame for completing the piece, the fact that Verdi did make sketches of some of the music in advance, the opportunity "to allow the newly-acquired Parisian elements to become assimilated into his Italian style" – resulting in "the best of it set[ting] a new standard in Verdian opera." He demonstrates how in act 3, "the sensitive scoring, the flexibility of the musical forms, the growing importance of the role which Verdi assigned to the orchestra ... permits him to write two lengthy dialogue recitatives (Luisa and Miller; Luisa and Rodolfo). Of these two duets, David Kimball notes that they "best illustrate Verdi's habit of fashioning the musical forms to match the dramatic purpose", although Parker slightly qualifies this by stating that he sees the opera's importance amongst those written pre-Rigoletto as being not so much "for its formal experiments as for its control of conventional musical forms, especially the grand duet." In that regard, he sees it as resembling Il trovatore.

As to the overall importance of Luisa, Baldini goes as far as to state that:

in terms of artistic value the opera is comparable only to Nabucco, Ernani, and Macbeth. It is, in short, the fourth Verdi opera which may be taken completely seriously: and up to this point he had written fourteen.

Another musical example has been noted by Budden (See "Composition history" above): that Verdi was unwilling to set a conventional stretta to end act 2 (but, at the same time, he accommodated the librettist who wanted the act to conclude with music that "should quicken towards an animated finish"). In musical terms, Budden notes that Verdi agreed and:

Ended with an allegro in three mounting stages; but it is nothing like a conventional stretta. Nor is there any operatic model for this type of ending. Verdi had gone far beyond the example of his Italian predecessors in allowing the original drama to dictate his formal ideas.

== Recordings ==
Year	Luisa, Rodolfo, Miller, Federica, Count Walter, Wurm	Conductor, Opera House and Orchestra	Label
1951	Lucy Kelston, Giacomo Lauri-Volpi, Scipio Colombo, Mitì Truccato Pace, Giacomo Vaghi, Duilio Baronti	Mario Rossi, RAI Chorus and Orchestra	Opera d'Oro; Cat: 1429
1964	Anna Moffo, Carlo Bergonzi, Cornell MacNeil, Shirley Verrett, Giorgio Tozzi, Ezio Flagello	Fausto Cleva, RCA Italiana Opera Chorus and Orchestra	Audio CD: RCA Red Seal; Cat: 88875073462
1975	Montserrat Caballe, Luciano Pavarotti, Sherrill Milnes, Anna Reynolds, Bonaldo Giaiotti, Richard van Allan	Peter Maag, London Opera Chorus; National Philharmonic	Audio CD: Arts Archive; Cat: 430882
1979	Katia Ricciarelli, Plácido Domingo, Renato Bruson, Elena Obraztsova, Gwynne Howell, Wladimiro Ganzarolli	Lorin Maazel, Royal Opera House, Covent Garden Chorus and Orchestra	Audio CD: Deutsche Grammophon; Cat: B00003ZA2E Video recording:
1979	Renata Scotto, Plácido Domingo, Sherrill Milnes, Jean Kraft, Bonaldo Giaiotti, James Morris	James Levine, Metropolitan Opera orchestra and chorus (Recorded live 20 January)	DVD: Deutsche Grammophon; Cat: DG 073 4027 and B0007070-09; SD video: Met Opera on Demand
1988	June Anderson, Taro Ichihara, Edward Toumajian, Susanna Anselmi, Paul Plishka, Romuald Tesarowicz	Maurizio Arena, Opéra de Lyon Orchestra and Chorus and Opéra de Montpellier Chorus	VHS: Home Vision; LUI-01 (NTSC);Polygram 079 262-3 (PAL); DVD: Kultur Video
1991	Aprile Millo, Plácido Domingo, Vladimir Chernov, Florence Quivar, Paul Plishka, Jan-Hendrik Rootering	James Levine, Metropolitan Opera orchestra and chorus	Audio CD: Sony Classical; 48073
2006	Darina Takova, Giuseppe Sabbatini, Damiano Salerno, Ursula Ferri, Arutjun Kotchinian, Alexander Vinogradov	Maurizio Benini, La Fenice orchestra and chorus	DVD:Naxos; Cat: 2.110225-26
2007	Fiorenza Cedolins, Marcelo Álvarez, Leo Nucci, Katarina Nikolic, Giorgio Surian, Rafał Siwek	Donato Renzetti, Teatro Regio di Parma orchestra and chorus	DVD:C major Cat:722904
2012	Olesya Golovneva, Luc Robert, Vladislav Sulimsky, Ivonne Fuchs, Taras Shtonda, Lars Arvidson	Michael Güttler, Malmö Opera Chorus and Orchestra	DVD:Arthaus Musik; Cat:101688
2018	Marina Rebeka, Ivan Magrì, George Petean, Judit Kutasi, Marko Mimica, Ante Jerkunica	Ivan Repušić, Münchner Rundfunkorchester, Chor des Bayerischen Rundfunks	CD:BR Klassik, Cat:900323
2018	Sonya Yoncheva, Piotr Beczała, Plácido Domingo, Olesya Petrova, Alexander Vinogradov, Dmitry Belosselskiy	Bertrand de Billy, Metropolitan Opera orchestra and chorus (Recorded live 14 April)	HD video: Met Opera on Demand
