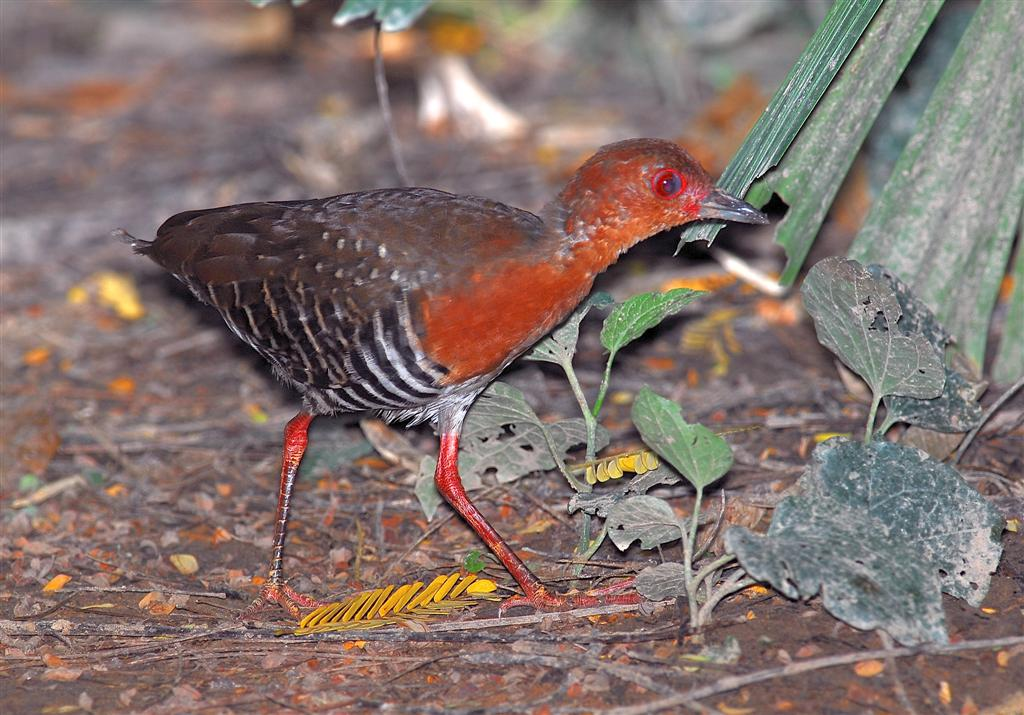

Conservation status
- Least Concern (IUCN 3.1)

Scientific classification
- Kingdom: Animalia
- Phylum: Chordata
- Class: Aves
- Order: Gruiformes
- Family: Rallidae
- Genus: Rallina
- Species: R. fasciata

Binomial name
- Rallina fasciata (Raffles, 1822)

= Red-legged crake =

Species of bird

The red-legged crake (Rallina fasciata) is a waterbird in the rail and crake family, Rallidae.

== Description ==
It is a medium-large crake (length 24 cm). Its head, neck and breast red-brown, paler on throat. Its upper parts are grey-brown. Underparts and underwings are barred black and white. Its bill is green and its legs are red.

== Distribution and habitat ==
Found in far north-eastern India, eastern Bangladesh, Burma, Thailand, Malaysia, Singapore, the Philippines and Indonesia. It has also been recorded as a vagrant to north-western Australia, Lanyu near Taiwan, and Palau. It is located in dense vegetation close to permanent wetlands, from paddy fields to dense rainforest. It is partly migratory, but the nature of its movements are poorly understood.

== Behaviour ==
=== Breeding ===
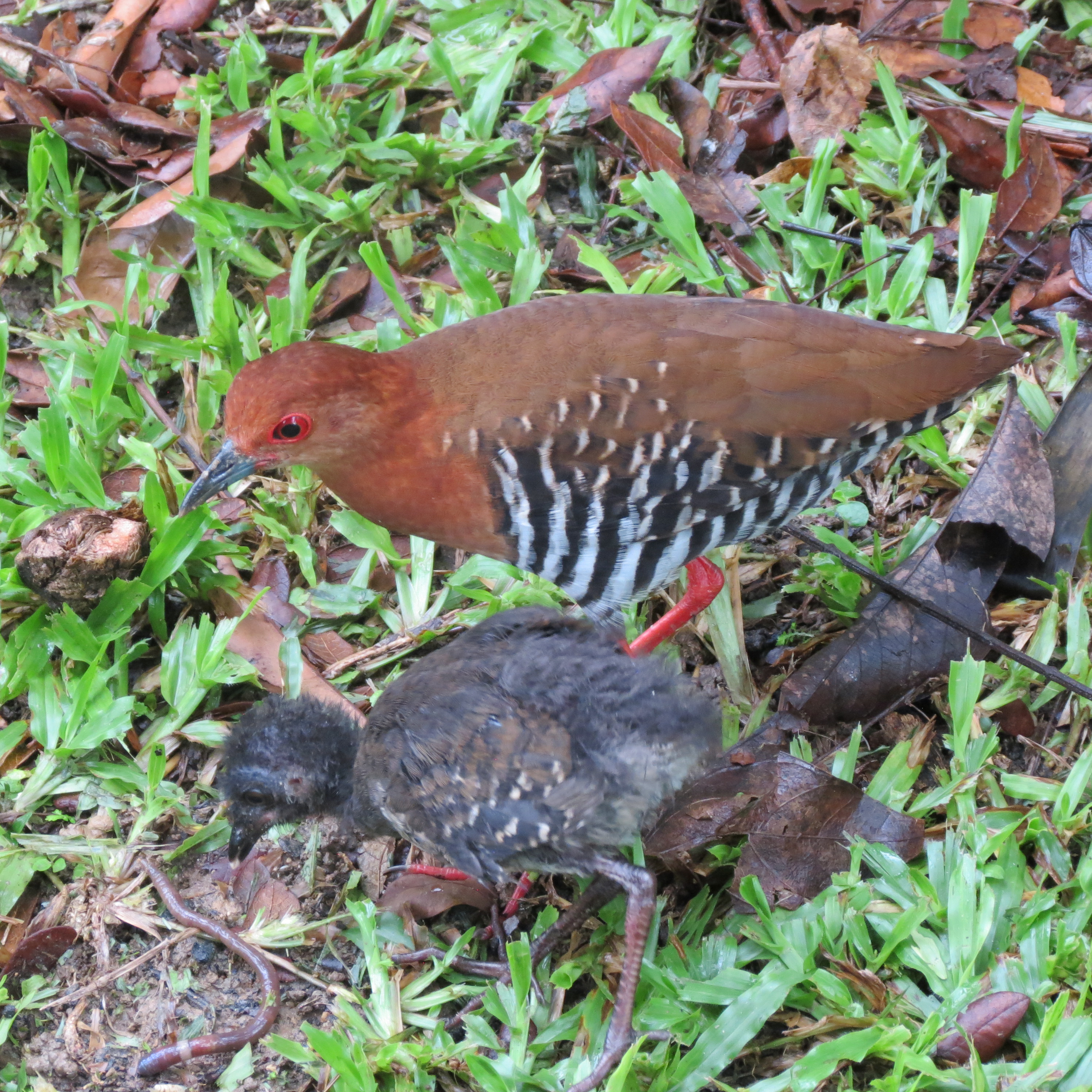
Red-legged crake and chick

The breeding behaviour or the red-legged crake is poorly known. The nest has not been described, but it is reported to have a clutch of 3-6 dull-white eggs, which both parents incubate. The chicks are covered in dark brown down on hatching.

=== Voice ===
Series of descending croaks, screams and grunts.

== Conservation ==
With a large range and no evidence of significant decline, this species is assessed as being of least concern.
