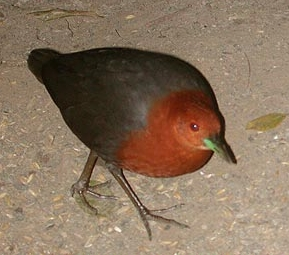
- Red-necked crake (Rallina tricolor)

Scientific classification
- Kingdom: Animalia
- Phylum: Chordata
- Class: Aves
- Order: Gruiformes
- Family: Rallidae
- Genus: Rallina; G.R. Gray, 1846

Type species
- Rallus fasciatus Raffles, 1822

Synonyms
- Tomirdus Mathews, 1912

= Rallina =

Genus of birds

Rallina is a genus of bird in the rail family, Rallidae. It contains four species found in forest and marshland in Asia and Australasia. They are 18–34 cm long and mainly chestnut or brown, often with black and white markings.

Four African species formerly usually placed in Rallina are now placed in the genus Rallicula; some taxonomic authorities continue to place them in Rallina, but as the pronounced sexual dimorphism of Rallicula shows, they are no true rails at all, but instead belong to the recently separated (though outwardly similar) flufftail family Sarothruridae.

== Species ==
The genus contains the following four species:

Genus Rallina – G.R. Gray, 1846 – four species
Common name	Scientific name and subspecies	Range	Size and ecology	IUCN status and estimated population
Red-necked crake	Rallina tricolor Gray, 1858	the Moluccas, Lesser Sundas, New Guinea lowlands and adjacent islands, and north-eastern Australia.	Size: Habitat: Diet:	LC
Andaman crake	Rallina canningi (Blyth, 1863)	Andaman Islands	Size: Habitat: Diet:	LC
Red-legged crake	Rallina fasciata (Raffles, 1822)	north-eastern India, eastern Bangladesh, Burma, Thailand, Malay Peninsula, Borneo and Indonesia	Size: Habitat: Diet:	LC
Slaty-legged crake	Rallina eurizonoides (Lafresnaye, 1845)	India, Pakistan, and Sri Lanka to the Philippines and Indonesia.	Size: Habitat: Diet:	LC

A fifth Rallina species, the Great Nicobar crake, was proposed but not formally described in 2012. As of 2023, the supposed new species was only recorded twice, in 2011 and 2015; however, in 2021 populations of Red-legged and Slaty-legged crakes were discovered to inhabit Great Nicobar Island. It was thus suggested that the "Great Nicobar crake" is a hybrid between these two species. However, the putative new species was observed again in 2025 in a different part of the island so was suggested to indeed be a new species.
