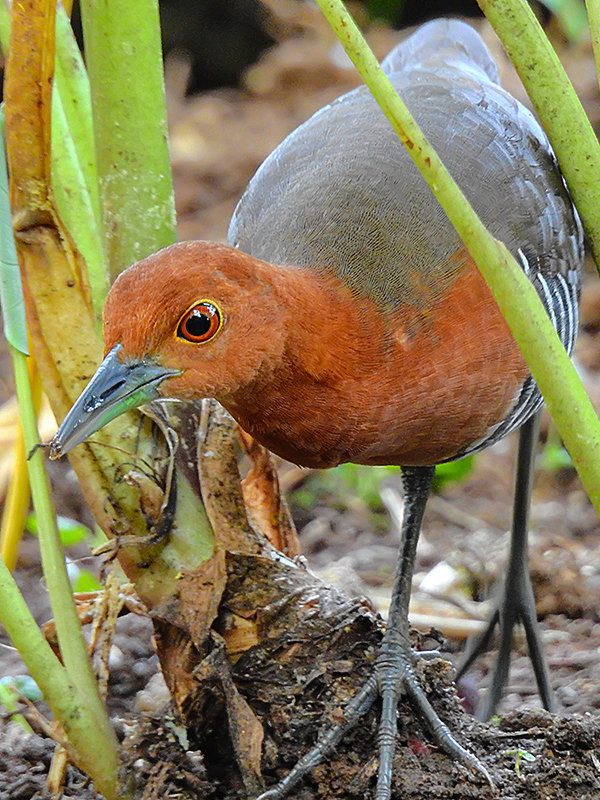
- Rallina eurizonoides Mangaon, Maharashtra, India

Conservation status
- Least Concern (IUCN 3.1)

Scientific classification
- Kingdom: Animalia
- Phylum: Chordata
- Class: Aves
- Order: Gruiformes
- Family: Rallidae
- Genus: Rallina
- Species: R. eurizonoides

Binomial name
- Rallina eurizonoides (Lafresnaye, 1845)

Synonyms
- Rallina euryzonoides; Rallina minahasa

= Slaty-legged crake =

Species of bird

The slaty-legged crake or banded crake (Rallina eurizonoides) is a waterbird in the rail and crake family, Rallidae.

== Distribution and habitat ==
Its breeding habitat is swamps and similar wet areas in well-wooded country across south Asia east from India, Pakistan, and Sri Lanka to the Philippines and Indonesia. The rails are mainly permanent residents throughout their range, but some northern populations migrate further south in winter.

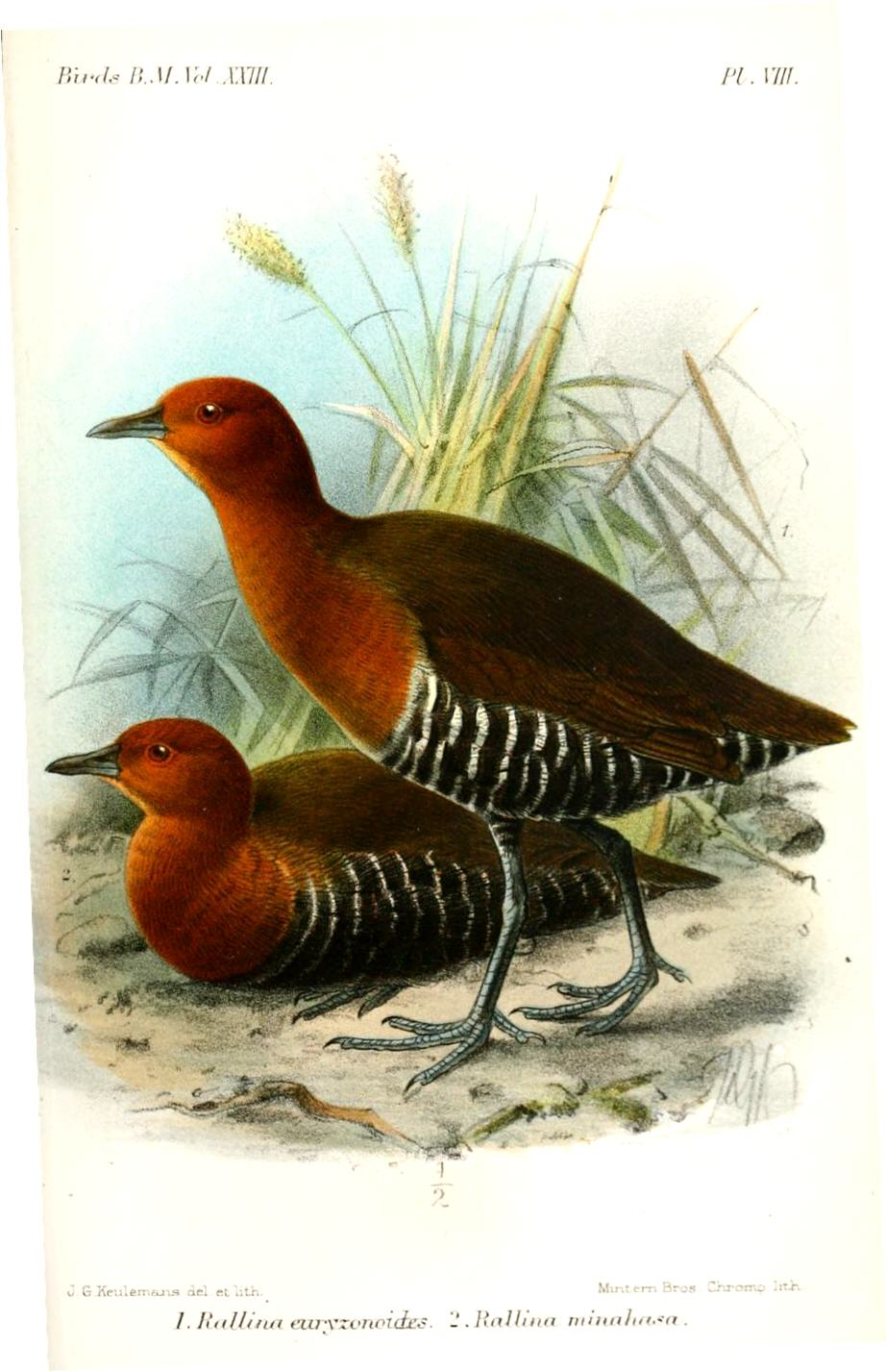

== Description ==
The slaty-legged crake is about 25 cm long. Its body is flattened laterally to allow easier passage through the undergrowth. It has long toes and a short tail. Colouring includes a brown back, chestnut head and breast, and strong black-and-white barring on the flanks, belly and undertail. The throat is white, the bill is yellowish, and the legs are green. Sexes are similar; juveniles are dark brown above and below, although they have the belly barring and white throat.

== Behaviour ==
Slaty-legged crakes are territorial, but are quite secretive, hiding in bushes when disturbed. They probe with their bill in mud or shallow water, also picking up food by sight. They forage for berries and insects on the ground, or clambering through bushes and undergrowth. They nest in a dry location on the ground or low bush usually near forest paths and forest streams, laying 4–8 eggs. A study conducted in Nilambur, Kerala in southern India shows that the incubation period was about 20 days.
