= Enigmatic scale =

Musical scale

Enigmatic scale on C. Ascending Descending

The enigmatic scale is an asymmetric sequence of notes with elements of the major and whole-tone scales. The scale's fourth degree is a semitone higher in the ascending version than it is during the descent.

The scale was invented in 1888 as a compositional challenge, which was notably taken up by Giuseppe Verdi.

== History ==
The enigmatic scale was invented by Adolfo Crescentini, a professor of music at the Bologna Conservatory. On August 5, 1888, Casa Ricordi's Gazzetta Musicale di Milano published what it called a harmonic curiosity sent to them from Bologna. The paper wrote that the scale's unnamed inventor promised it would be effective if properly harmonized and left its readers to the task. The following week, Gazzetta promised to publish several of the solutions they received to the rebus.

On August 26, Gazzetta published several realizations of the puzzle and identified its creator. Crescentini's harmonization appeared behind four others. The game might have been forgotten if Giuseppe Verdi had not worked out his own solution, which became the basis of the "Ave Maria (sulla scala enigmatica)", part of the Quattro Pezzi Sacri (Four Sacred Pieces, 1889).

Incipit of Giuseppe Verdi's Ave Maria.

Hermann Scherchen compared Verdi's Ave Maria to Johann Sebastian Bach's The Art of Fugue and Ludwig van Beethoven's Grosse Fuge . He concluded Verdi must have composed the work out of a "sense of mental obligation" with its "still almost incomprehensible into-one-another-gliding of harmonies over the entirely 'unnatural' scala enigmatica". Verdi deploys the scale as a cantus firmus for the piece. Edward Dannreuther wrote about the composer's treatment of the melody, "the queer counterpoint which Verdi applies to it is far-fetched and difficult of intonation; the total effect is almost, if not quite, as musical as it is curious".

Luigi Nono was particularly influenced by Verdi's Ave Maria and frequently drew on the enigmatic scale. His string quartet Fragmente-Stille, an Diotima (1980) is his most explicit use of the scale.

Joe Satriani used the scale in "The Enigmatic" from his debut album Not of This Earth (1986).

== Structure ==
The enigmatic scale incorporates features from other familiar sequences in its asymmetric structure. The opening half step calls to mind the Phrygian mode. The next interval is an augmented second most often encountered in the harmonic minor scale. From there, the scale proceeds in whole steps. The imitation of the whole-tone scale bypasses the dominant. The final two steps are semitones reminiscent of the chromatic scale. In the descent, the fourth scale degree is lowered by a semitone. This creates an additional augmented second and deepens the scale's enigma.

Hermann Scherchen saw it as a hybrid structure that draws on the minor (tones 1–3), major (3–5), whole-tone (3–6), and chromatic scales (6–8).
