= Albert Horne =

South African conductor

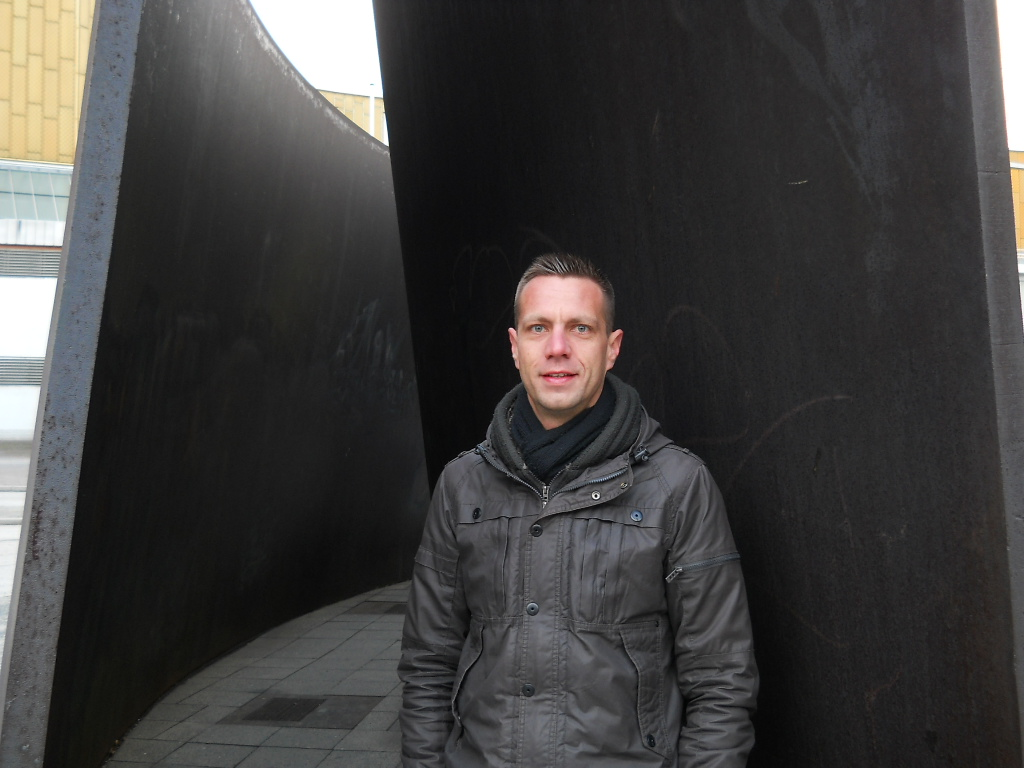
- Albert Horne in front of Richard Serra's memorial "Berlin Junction" at the Berlin Philharmonie, 26 December 2012.
- Born: 22 March 1980 (age 46); Cape Town, South Africa
- Education: Guildhall School of Music and Drama
- Occupations: Opera chorus master; Conductor
- Organizations: Cape Town Opera; Hessisches Staatstheater Wiesbaden; Deutsche Oper am Rhein
- Website: alberthorne.com

Albert Horne is a South African-born chorus master and orchestral conductor, whose focus is opera chorus preparation and operatic performances. He is the Chorus Master of the Deutsche Oper am Rhein in Düsseldorf and Duisburg. Before that, he was chorus master and conductor at the Hessisches Staatstheater Wiesbaden and at the Cape Town Opera. He is also a founding member and a member of the steering committee of Opera Europa's chorus forum.

== Career ==
Born in Cape Town, South Africa, Horne studied at the South African College of Music in Cape Town and at the Guildhall School of Music and Drama in London. He was the chorus master and conductor of the Cape Town Opera from 2007 to 2014. In 2013, the chorus was awarded “Opera Chorus of the Year” at the International Opera Awards in London.

In 2012, Horne prepared the chorus for Simon Rattle's concert performances of Gershwin's Porgy and Bess at the Philharmonie with the Berlin Philharmonic. He has conducted orchestras such as the Munich Symphony Orchestra, the Orchestra Victoria in Melbourne, the Hessisches Staatsorchester in Wiesbaden and the Orchestre Pasdeloup at the Théâtre du Châtelet in Paris. He also conducted performances in the opera houses of Bordeaux, Cardiff, Malmö, Tel Aviv and at London's ENO. In a performance of the Internationale Maifestspiele Wiesbaden, he conducted Gershwin's Porgy and Bess with the chorus of the Cape Town Opera and the orchestra of the Hessisches Staatstheater Wiesbaden in a production which was regarded as one of the best contributions of the year's festival because of its authenticity.

Horne was chorus master and conductor at the Hessisches Staatstheater Wiesbaden from 2014 to 2025, where he was responsible for the preparation of the opera chorus, and also conducted productions of Bernstein's Candide, Puccini's Madama Butterfly and La Bohème, as well as Mussorgsky's Boris Godunov. In 2017, he conducted and also prepared the chorus for Britten's Peter Grimes, staged by Philipp M. Krenn. He also conducted the World Premiere of Søren Nils Eichberg's new opera, Schönerland, the Wiesbaden premiere of Tim Plegge's ballet Liliom with the Hessisches Staatsballet, as well as a symphony concert with the Hessisches Staatsorchester. In 2018 he also conducted the Landesjugendorchester Rheinland-Pfalz on tour in Germany, South Africa and Botswana. He returned to the podium in 2019 to conduct Mark-Anthony Turnage's Anna Nicole and the revival of Britten's Peter Grimes in Wiesbaden, an orchestral concert with the Rheinische Orchesterakademie Mainz, as well as several concerts with the Münchner Symphoniker in the Gasteig and the Prinzregententheater in Munich. On 1 May 2022, he conducted the Wiesbaden premiere of Jörg Widmann's Babylon as the opening piece of the 2022 Internationale Maifestspiele Wiesbaden, as well as the 8th Symphony Concert, with a programme including Leoš Janáček’s Glagolitic Mass. In 2023, he conducted the world premiere of Søren Nils Eichberg's Oryx and Crake, as well as the New Year's Concert and a revival of Puccini's Il trittico.

During the 2023/2024 Season in Wiesbaden, he conducted a new production of Stephen Sondheim’s Follies (starring Pia Douwes) and a symphony concert with the Hessisches Staatsorchester, and during the 2024/2025 Season he conducted Mozart's Die Zauberflöte and Nikolaus Habjan's acclaimed production of Rossini's Il Barbiere di Siviglia.

Horne was appointed Chorus Master at the Deutsche Oper am Rhein in Düsseldorf and Duisburg in August 2025.
