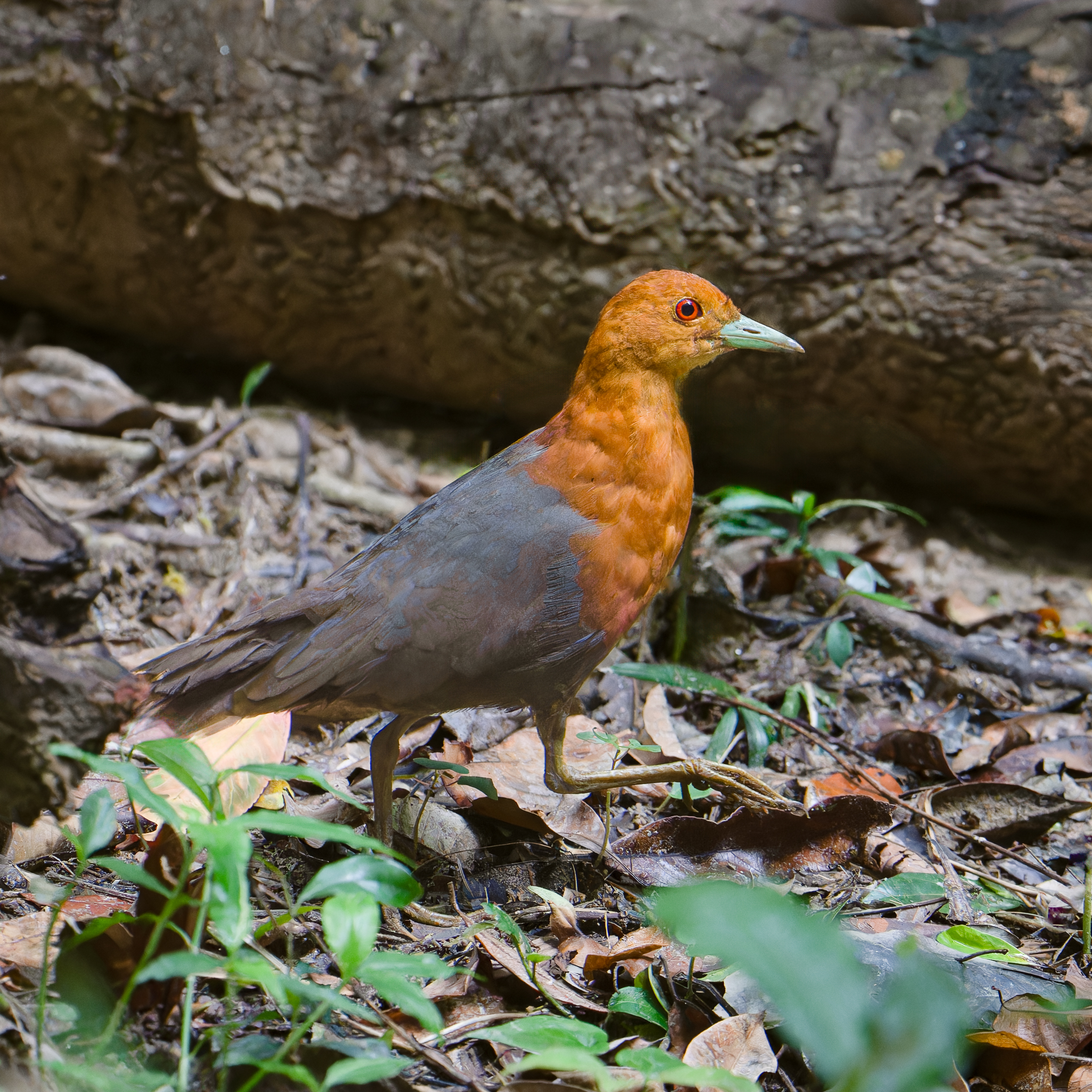

Conservation status
- Least Concern (IUCN 3.1)

Scientific classification
- Kingdom: Animalia
- Phylum: Chordata
- Class: Aves
- Order: Gruiformes
- Family: Rallidae
- Genus: Rallina
- Species: R. tricolor

Binomial name
- Rallina tricolor Gray, 1858

Synonyms
- Tomirdus tricolor (Gray, 1858)

= Red-necked crake =

Species of bird

The red-necked crake (Rallina tricolor) is a waterbird in the rail and crake family, Rallidae.

== Description ==
The red-necked crake is a large crake (length 25 cm, wingspan 40 cm, weight 200 g). Its head, neck and breast are red-brown, with a paler version of that color on the throat. The upperparts are grey-brown, while the underparts are grey-brown with pale barring. The underwing is barred black and white, the bill green, and the legs grey-brown.

== Distribution and habitat ==
Red-necked crakes live in the Moluccas, Lesser Sundas, New Guinea lowlands and adjacent islands, and north-eastern Australia. They are found in tropical rainforests and dense vegetation close to permanent wetlands.

== Behaviour ==
=== Diet ===
The bird's diet consists of amphibians, aquatic invertebrates, crustaceans and molluscs.

=== Breeding ===
The bird rests on or close to ground in dense vegetation. It lays clutches of 3-5 dull-white eggs, the incubation periods of which are around 20 days. The chicks emerge covered in black down, precocial and nidifugous.

=== Voice ===
The crake makes repetitive clicking calls and soft grunts.

== Conservation ==
With a large range and no evidence of significant decline, this species is assessed as being of least concern. The species is little studied and seldom seen due to its secretive nature, but appears to be locally common in New Guinea. In Australia it has suffered declines due to habitat loss.

== Gallery ==
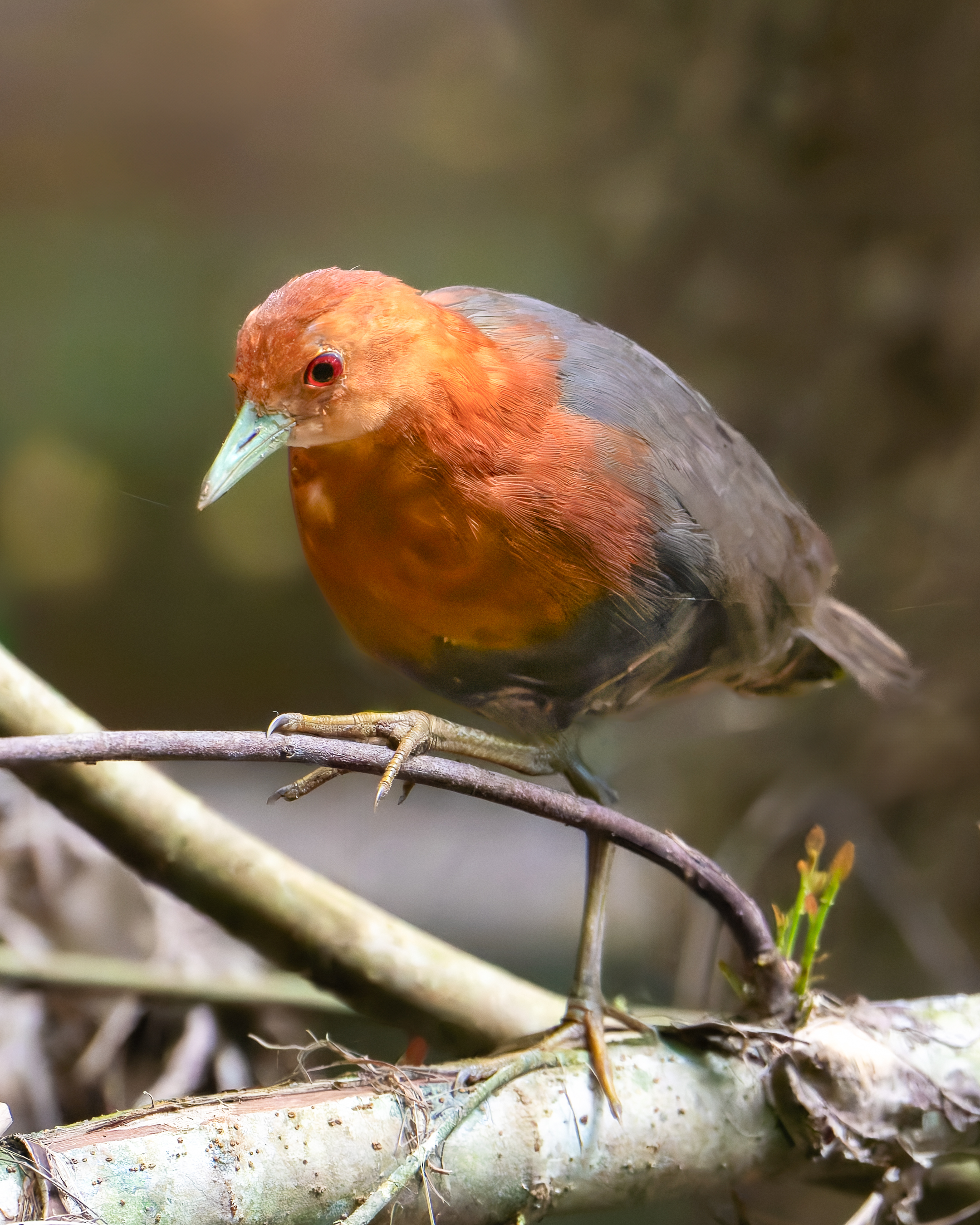
On branch over stream

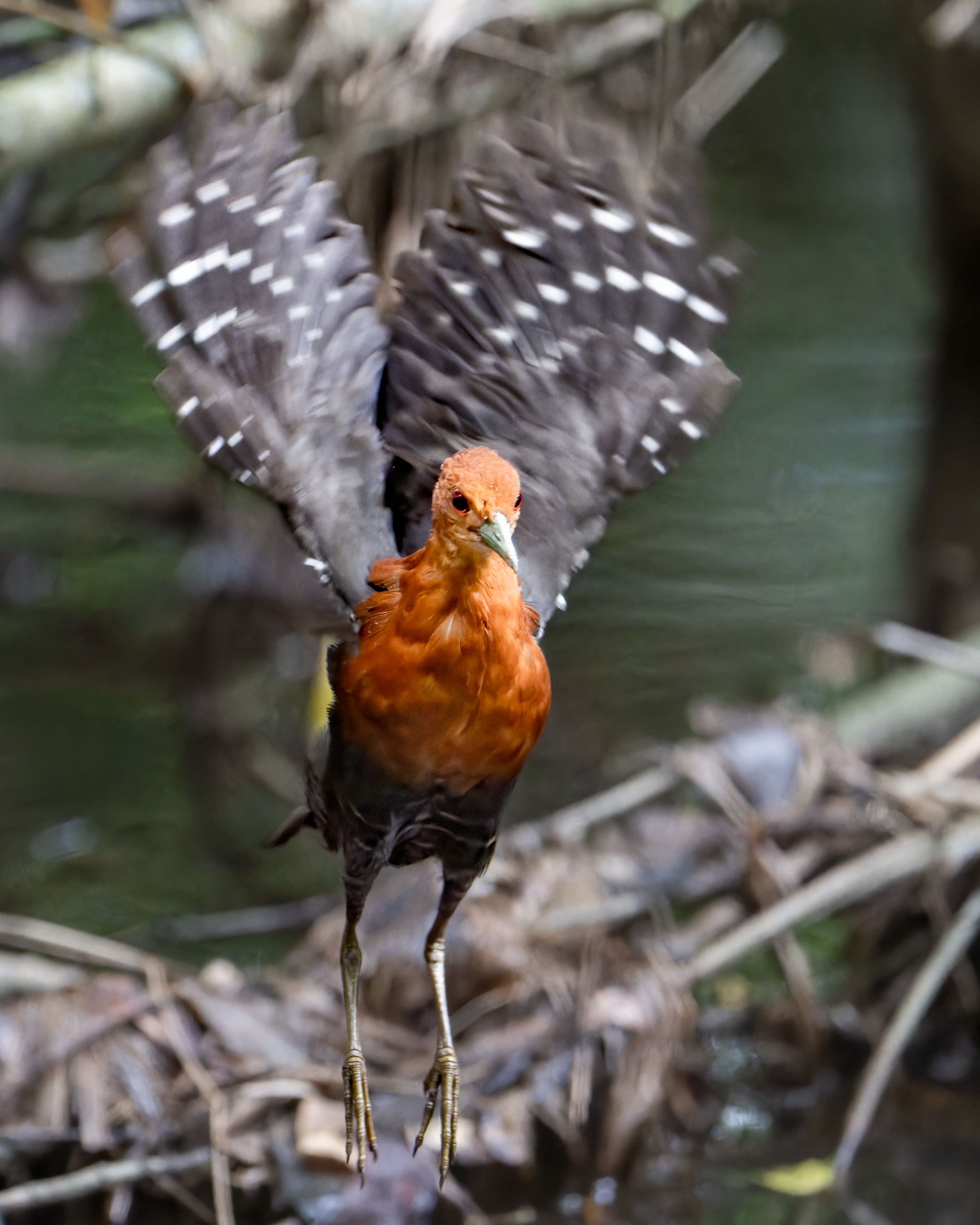
In flight showing barred wing feathers
