= Quattro pezzi sacri =

Set of choral compositions by Giuseppe Verdi

- by Giuseppe Verdi
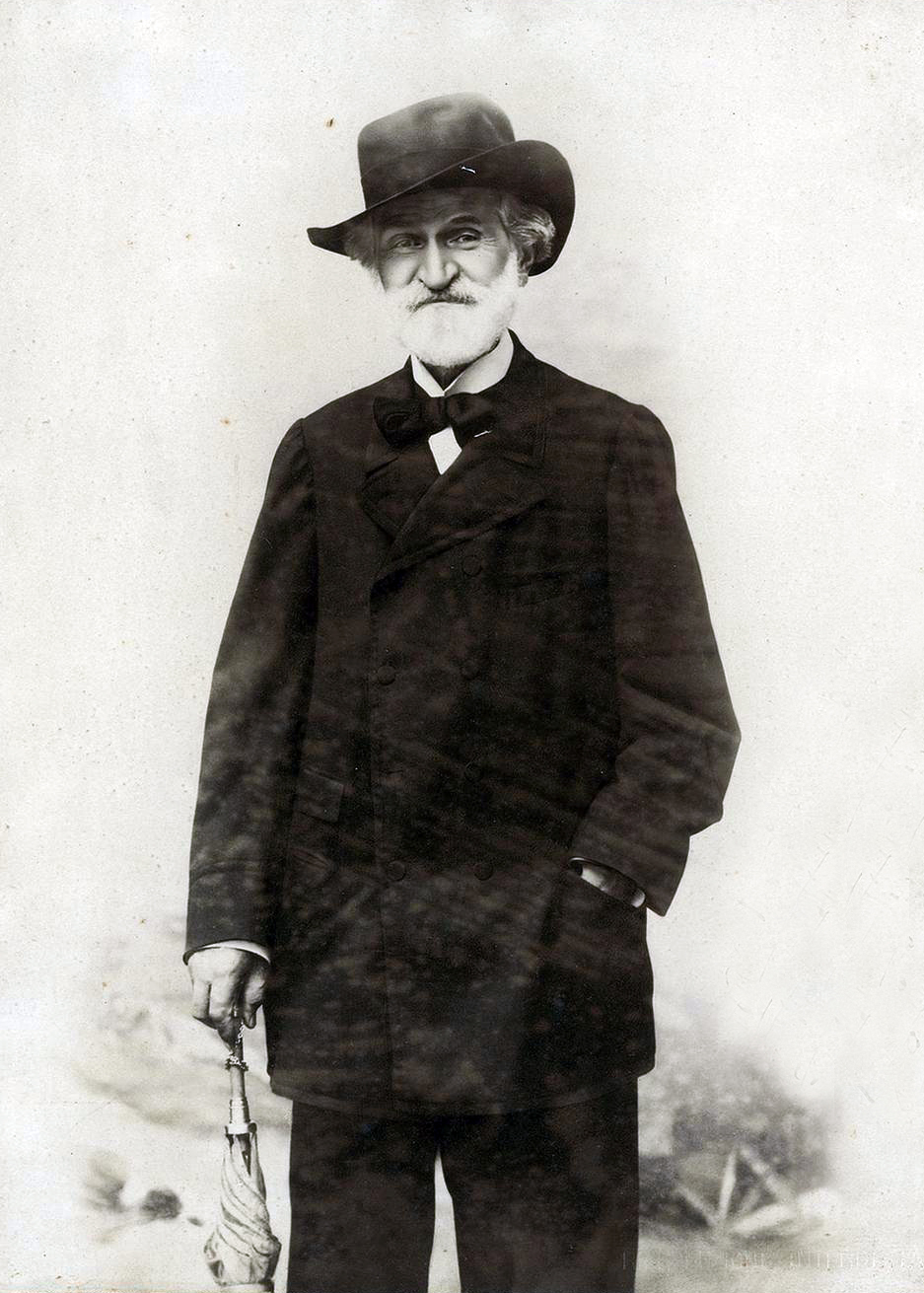
- English: Four Sacred Pieces
- Genre: Sacred vocal music
- Text: Ave Maria – Ave Maria; Stabat Mater – Stabat Mater; Laudi alla Vergine Maria – Canto XXXIII from Dante's Paradiso; Te Deum – Te Deum
- Language: Latin; Italian
- Composed: 1886 – 1897
- Performed: 7 April 1898: Paris Opera (without Ave Maria)
- Published: 1898: Milan

The Quattro pezzi sacri (Italian pronunciation: [ˈkwattro ˈpɛttsi ˈsaːkri], Four Sacred Pieces) are choral works by Giuseppe Verdi. Written separately during the last decades of the composer's life and with different origins and purposes, they were nevertheless published together in 1898 by Casa Ricordi. They are often performed as a cycle, not in chronological sequence of their composition, but in the sequence used in the Ricordi publication:

- Ave Maria – a setting of the Latin Ave Maria for four solo voices a cappella composed in 1889
- Stabat Mater – a setting of the Latin Stabat Mater for chorus and orchestra composed in 1896 and 1897
- Laudi alla Vergine Maria – a setting of a prayer in Canto XXXIII of Dante's Paradiso for four female voices a cappella composed between 1886 and 1888
- Te Deum – a setting of the Latin Te Deum for double chorus and orchestra composed in 1895 and 1896.

They were first performed together (without the Ave Maria) in a concert by the Paris Opera on 7 and 8 April 1898 under the baton of Paul Taffanel.

== History ==
After Verdi finished his opera Aida and in 1874 the Messa da Requiem, he retired from composing for years, writing only minor sacred compositions such as a Pater Noster and an Ave Maria in 1880. The earliest of the Quattro pezzi sacri in terms of its composition date is what came to be known as Laudi alla Vergine Maria (although Verdi himself did not give it that title). It was composed between 1886 and 1888, during which time he was also working on his penultimate opera, Otello, which premiered in 1887. The second of the Pezzi to be composed was the Ave Maria, whose setting is built on an enigmatic scale. He originally composed it in 1889 and revised it for publication in 1897. The Te Deum was begun in 1895 two years after the premiere of his last opera, Falstaff. It was finished in the summer of 1896. The Stabat Mater followed, and all four pieces were sent to Verdi's publisher, Casa Ricordi, in June 1897

== Music ==
At the end of his life Verdi returned to his beginnings as a church musician. He studied Bach's Mass in B minor and compositions by Palestrina, whose influence is apparent in the Laudi alla Vergine Maria.

The publisher Schott gives the total performance time as 37 minutes.

=== Ave Maria ===

Verdi was inspired in 1889 to compose Ave Maria by the enigmatic scale C–D♭–E–F♯–G♯–A♯–B–C which Adolfo Crescentini (1854–1921) had published in Ricordi's magazine Gazetta musicale di Milano, inviting composers to harmonise it. Verdi wrote a setting for four unaccompanied voices, consisting of four sections in which each voice group sings using the enigmatic scale, with the bass voice entering first, followed by alto, tenor and soprano, whereas the three remaining voices supply harmonic texture. He commented: "An Ave Maria. It will be my fourth! Perhaps I shall be beatified by the Holy Father."

Verdi revised the work in June 1897 for the publication. The music publisher Schott renders the subtitle as "Scala enigmatica armonizzata a 4 voci miste" (Enigmatic scale harmonised for four mixed voices). The overall form of the Ave Maria is very regular, built around two sections of 32 measures each, followed by a seven-bar coda. The complete text is set twice in each section, and no lines of the poetic text are repeated.

It takes about six minutes to perform.

=== Stabat Mater ===
While Ave Maria is set for soloists, Verdi scored the Stabat Mater for a four-part mixed chorus (SATB) and a large orchestra of three flutes, two oboes, two clarinets. four bassoons, four horns, three trumpets, four trombones, percussion (timpani and bass drum), harp and strings.

The work is through-composed, without repetition of text. It is full of chromaticism. Melodic parts, similar to arias, contrast with a cappella passages and dramatic outbursts. The music reaches a climax on the text "Paradisi gloria" (glory of paradise), then dies down in the lowest registers of the strings.

A performance takes about 12 minutes.

=== Laudi alla Vergine Maria ===
Laudi alla Vergine Maria is another a cappella work, set for four solo female voices. It is based on a short prayer from in Canto XXXIII of Dantes's Paradiso, the third part of his Divina Commedia. Verdi alludes on the counterpoint of Renaissance music. Each stanza is introduced by a new motif. Biographer Budden describes the piece as "with the subtlest of harmonic and rhythmic inflexions, unashamedly modern in character". The audience requested a repetition when it was first performed. Publisher Schott renders the subtitle as "Tolte dall' ultimo canto del "Paradiso" di Dante per 4 voci feminili, sole" (Taken from the ultimate song of "Paradiso" by Dante for four female voices, solo).

It takes about six minutes to perform.

=== Te Deum ===
The Ambrosian Hymn Te Deum is scored for two four-part choirs, a short soprano solo and large orchestra, adding cor anglais and bass clarinet to the orchestra of the Stabat Mater, but without harp. Verdi wrote to Giovanni Tebaldini, director of music in Padua: "It is usually sung during grand, solemn and noisy ceremonies for a victory or a coronation etc. ... Humanity believes in the Judex Venturus, invokes Him in the Salvum fac and ends with a prayer, 'Dignare Domine die isto', which is moving, melancholy and sad even to the point of terror."

The music begins with the Gregorian chant Te deum laudamus, te Dominum confitemur, continued responsorially by the whole male choir in unison. The full choir and orchestra enter in partly dramatic scenes, reminiscent of the Messa da Requiem, interspersed by Gregorian chant. The final line in te speravi is first rendered by a single soprano voice from the choir, representing the "[voice of] mankind", as Verdi requested.The line is repeated by the choir, followed by a reticent postlude, similar to the conclusion of the Requiem.

A performance takes about 15 minutes. Verdi himself suggested 12 minutes.

== Performances ==
Verdi did not want the Ave Maria to be performed with the other pieces. According to his wish, three pieces were first performed on 7 and 8 April 1898 at the Paris Opera as part of a concert series of the Société des Concerts du Conservatoire, conducted by Paul Taffanel (1844–1908). Verdi was not present, because he had suffered a mild stroke, but sent Arrigo Boito with several requests, partly in writing, for performance details. The first performance in Italy, again without the Ave Maria, was conducted in Turin on 26 May 1898 by Arturo Toscanini who had talked to Verdi. The first performance in Austria on 13 November 1898 in Vienna was conducted by Richard von Perger and included the Ave Maria, but the two a cappella works were performed by the choir, not by solo voices as Verdi had intended.

Verdi liked the Te Deum best of the four works and reputedly wanted to be buried with the score.

== Bibliography ==
- Budden, Julian (2008). Verdi. Oxford University Press. ISBN 9780198043485.
- Schweikert, Uwe (2001). "Quattro pezzi sacri". In Gerhard, Anselm; Schweikert, Uwe (eds.). Verdi Handbuch (in German). Metzler Kassel, Bärenreiter Stuttgart and Weimar: Metzler. ISBN 9783476017680.
- Izzo, Francesco (2013). "A Tale of Survival: Choral Music in Italy". In Di Grazia, Donna M. (ed.). Nineteenth-Century Choral Music. Routledge. p. 318. ISBN 9780415988520.
- Rizzo, Dino (2014). "La Musica filosofica nei tre Pezzi sacri di Verdi". In Atti del Convegno Verdi, la Musica e il Sacro, Roncole Verdi - Busseto, 27-29 settembre 2013 a cura di Dino Rizzo, Fidenza, Mattioli 1885. ISBN 9788862614382
