= Søren Nils Eichberg =

German-Danish composer (born 1973)

Søren Nils Eichberg (born 23 July 1973) is a German-Danish classical composer and conductor.

== Biography ==
Eichberg was born in Stuttgart. He studied piano, composition and orchestra conducting in Copenhagen, Cologne and Berlin. He had his first break-through in 2001 when winning the Queen Elisabeth Competition for Composers in Brussels in 2001. Other awards and honours include the Tanglewood fellowship, the German Konrad-Adenauer Composition Grant and the Composition Stipend of the Danish Arts Foundation.

In 2010 he was announced as the first composer-in-residence of the Danish National Symphony Orchestra in the orchestra's history, which led to a close collaboration with the orchestra over a period of five years and to premieres and recordings of several large-scale works. His symphonic work was in 2017 shortlisted for the German Music Authors' Prize. Hilary Hahn recorded his composition Levitation for her Deutsche Grammophon album In 27 Pieces: The Hilary Hahn Encores, which was awarded a Grammy Award in 2014.

His works include three symphonies, several concertos, five operas and solo- and chamber music and are published by Universal Edition and Edition Wilhelm Hansen (Wise Music Group). He collaborates with Ensemble Modern, Mahler Chamber Orchestra and several radio orchestras across Europe.

As a conductor he has worked with Nordwestdeutsche Philharmonie, Hofer Symphoniker, Preussisches Kammerorchester, Berliner Symphoniker, Solistenensemble Kaleidoskop, Österreichisches Ensemble für Neue Musik and members of the Munich and Berlin Philharmonic Orchestras. Eichberg has taught and given lectures at Guildhall School of Music and Drama, Royal Conservatory of Brussels, Royal Danish Academy of Music, SRH Berlin School of Popular Arts and Yaşar University. He is chairman of the Danish Council for Music Stipends and Grants under the Danish Arts Foundation.

== Operas ==
Eichberg's chamber opera Glare, with libretto by Hannah Dübgen, was commissioned by Royal Opera House and opened in London in November 2014. Glare is a psycho-drama chamber-play with elements of science fiction, which focuses on the relationships between four protagonists one of who may or may not be an artificial human. It gained attention among bloggers, twitterers and the press with some calling it too violent, while others praised it as the perfect opera for the digital age. Richard Morrison in his review in The Times gave it 5 out of 5 stars saying that he could not remember a more gripping 75 minutes of avant-garde music-theatre than Glare. The opera has since been staged in Koblenz, the National Swedish Touring Theatre and at Opera North.

Eichberg's following opera about the European refugee crisis premiered at Staatstheater Wiesbaden in September 2017. In 2019 Theater Koblenz premiered his opera "Wolf unter Wölfen" with libretto by John von Düffel. In 2023, his opera Oryx and Crake, with libretto by Hannah Dübgen after the novel by Margaret Atwood, premiered in Wiesbaden. Oryx and Crake was nominated in the category "World Premiere" at the 2023 International Opera Awards.

== Works ==
=== Orchestra and Ensemble ===
- 2001 Qilaatersorneq for violin and orchestra
- 2001 Sacred Twilight for 11 instruments
- 2002 Pa'am for mixed choir, string quartet, piano, and harp
- 2002 Hærværk almost a concerto for piano and 10 instruments
- 2002/4 Piano concerto
- 2005 Symphony no. 1, Sturzten wir uns ins Feuer, for large orchestra
- 2006 Night Machine for ensemble
- 2006 Cello concerto
- 2010 Symphony no. 2, Before Heaven, Before Earth, for large orchestra
- 2012 Morpheus concerto for orchestra
- 2015 Symphony no. 3, for choir, electronics, and large orchestra
- 2015 Concerto for horn and orchestra
- 2016 Charybdis, concerto for viola and orchestra
- 2017 Lumière for two cellos and strings
- 2020 Concertino for flute, strings and horns

=== Chamber Music and Solo Works ===
- 2000 Two Aspects for two pianos and two percussionists
- 2001 Quartet set for string quartet
- 2001 Toccata for two violins
- 2002 Scherben (Fragments), 19 études-postludes for piano
- 2002 … and then she went to the sea … for violin and piano
- 2003 @|/|7|7#35|5 (Antithesis) for multi-percussion and electronics
- 2003 4 pieces for bassoon and piano
- 2003 Piano trio
- 2004 4 for viola and overtone singing
- 2005 Natsukusa-ya for violin, viola, cello, and piano
- 2005 Variations on a theme by Niccolò Paganini for cello
- 2005 Cantus for recorder, saxophone, and percussion
- 2010 In circles, 16 imaginary dances for 18 players. Premiere: December 2011, Alte Oper Frankfurt am Main, performed by Ensemble Modern.
- 2011 Nefertiti, piano, commissioned work for Klavierfieber 2011, inspired by the bust of Nefertiti, Egyptian Museum of Berlin. Premiere: 22 June 2011 Staatsbibliothek zu Berlin.

=== Music Theatre ===
- 2009 Grete Minde, ppera. Libretto: Constanze John
- 2011 Timeshift, experimental music theatre; with Niels Klein, Vassos Nicolaou, and Steingrimur Rohloff
- 2014 Glare, chamber opera. Libretto: Hannah Dübgen
- 2017 Schönerland, opera in 10 scenes. Libretto: Therese Schmidt
- 2019 Wolf Among Wolves, opera. Libretto: John von Düffel
- 2023 Oryx and Crake, opera. Libretto: Hannah Dübgen. Based on the novel Oryx and Crake by Margaret Atwood
