= Alois Brandhofer =

Austrian clarinetist and professor

Alois Brandhofer (born 19 June 1951) is an Austrian clarinettist and retired university professor. He was a professor at the Mozarteum University Salzburg and was principal clarinettist of the Vienna Symphony Orchestra and the Berlin Philharmonic Orchestra.

== Life ==
Born in Grabenegg (Ruprechtshofen), Brandhofer studied clarinet with Rudolf Jettel, the then solo clarinettist of the Vienna Philharmonic at the Vienna Academy of Music.

From 1972 to 1986, he was principal clarinettist of the Vienna Symphony Orchestra and from 1986 to 1992 principal clarinettist of the Berlin Philharmonic Orchestra. He has toured Europe and overseas as a soloist and chamber musician. Solo concerts with conductors such as C. M. Giulini, T. Guschlbauer, L. Hager, G. Bertini, J. Lopez Cobos, Chr. Eschenbach.

From 1992 until his retirement, Brandhofer was professor at the Mozarteum University in Salzburg.

Brandhofer was a member of the Ensemble of the 20th Century and the Philharmonic Octet Berlin. As a soloist and chamber musician, he has performed with, among others, the Amadeus Quartet, the Haydn Trio Wien, the Gewandhaus Quartet Leipzig, the Thomas Brandis Quartet, Margaret Price, Thomas Christian, András Schiff and Milan Turković and has performed several times at the Salzburg Festival.

== Students ==
His students include:

- Gaspare Buonomano – (NDR Sinfonieorchester)
- Attila Balogh – (NDR Sinfonieorchester)
- Jochen Tschabrun – (Frankfurt Radio Symphony)
- Mate Bekavac
- Dusan Sodja – (Slovenska filharmonija)
- Florian Mühlberger – (Volksoper Wien)
- Rony Moser – (Qatar Philharmonic Orchestra)
- Beatriz Lopez – (Real Filarmonia de Galicia)
- Walter Seebacher – (Tiroler Landeskonservatorium).
- Simon Reitmaier

== Awards ==
- 1997: Europäischer Kammermusikpreis in Venedig.

== Premieres ==
- Frank Michael Beyer: Canciones für Klarinette und Ensemble
- Richard Dünser: Sinfonietta concertante für Klarinette und Streichorchester
- Helmut Eder: Trio für Klarinette, Viola und Klavier, op. 104
- Herbert Willi: Stück für Klarinette solo
- Herbert Willi: Froher Gesang – Stück für Klarinette und Klavier
