= Simon Reitmaier =

Austrian clarinetist

Simon Reitmaier is an Austrian clarinettist.

== Life ==
Reitmaier was born in Telfs. Reitmaier completed his studies in clarinet performance at the Mozarteum University Salzburg with Alois Brandhofer and at the Musik und Kunst Privatuniversität der Stadt Wien with Matthias Schorn with distinction. He has won prizes at national and international competitions. In 2009, he received the START scholarship of the Austrian Ministry of Culture.

Solo activity took place with the Duisburg Philharmonic, Niederösterreichische Tonkünstler, Salzburg Chamber Soloists, Regensburg Chamber Orchestra, Amadeus Consort Salzburg, Orchestra 1756, Tyrolean Chamber Orchestra Innstrumenti, Budapest Virtuosi and concentus 21. Chamber music activity took place with the Auner Quartet, Quartet 1791 and Quartet Goldegg, Joji Hattori, Christoph Traxler, Frank Hoffmann. In June 2013, Reitmaier made his debut at Carnegie Hall/Weill Recital Hall with the Mahler String Quartet. Concerts in Japan, Taiwan, Russia, the US and Europe followed. Reitmaier has participated in CD, radio and TV productions. Reitmaier has a special interest in the music of the turn of the century. In autumn 2016, together with actor Frank Hoffmann, he staged the evening Vienna around 1900 – Life, Dream, Death at the Klimt Villa in Vienna Hietzing.

In 2014, he released the solo CD Im Atem der Zeit – Musik für Klarinette Solo at Bank Austria Salon/Altes Rathaus. Other appearances include the ORF programme Barbara Rett meets..., Malta/Gozo Victoria Arts Festival, Neubeurer Woche, Salzkammergut Festwochen Gmunden, Manoire de Lebioles and the Austrian Cultural Forum London. In 2018, Reitmaier released the CD "Klarinettenquintette Mozart, Reger, Leitner" together with the Auner Quartett on the Gramola Vienna label.

Since 2015 Reitmaier has been a lecturer at the annual "Sommerakademie Lilienfeld". Johanna Doderer composed the trio "The Blossom" for clarinet, violin and piano for Reitmaier. Kalevi Aho composed Solo XIV for Reitmaier in the summer of 2018. The quality of Reitmaier's clarinet playing has been praised by critics in the course of various performances.

== Premieres ==
In October 2015, as part of the concert series Geras klingt, the world premiere of Geras Variations for Clarinet and Accordion by Mayako Kubo, together with Alfred Melichar took place.

The Austrian composer Ernst Ludwig Leitner composed his Clarinet Concerto for Reitmaier in the summer of 2014. The world premiere followed in April 2016 (concert hall arlberg 1800) with the Salzburg Chamber Soloists under the conduct of Lavard Skou-Larsen.

In October 2016 was the premiere of the clarinet concerto anElyson for solo clarinet and chamber orchestra by Franz Baur together with the Tyrolean Chamber Orchestra Innstrumenti conducted by Gerhard Sammer.

== Recordings ==
- Im Atem der Zeit – Musik für Klarinette Solo.
- Ernst-Ludwig Leitner Klarinettenkonzert (Salzburg Chamber Soloists).
