= Alfred Uhl =

Austrian composer, violist, music teacher and conductor

- Born: 5 June 1909; Vienna, Austria
- Died: 8 June 1992 (aged 83)
- Occupations: Composer, violist, music teacher and conductor.

Alfred Uhl (5 June 1909 – 8 June 1992) was an Austrian composer, violist, music teacher and conductor.

== Biography ==
Uhl was born in Vienna and studied with Franz Schmidt at the Vienna Music Academy, receiving a diploma in composition with honours in 1932. He subsequently worked as Kapellmeister of the Swiss Festspielmusik in Zürich. While there he composed scores for a variety of cultural and industrial films. He returned to Vienna in 1938 and in 1940 was drafted into the Austrian Army. From 1940 to 1942 he commanded a French prison camp in Neumarkt. He joined the faculty of the Vienna Music Academy in 1945, where he taught theory, orchestration and composition until his retirement in 1980. One of his notable students was Alfred Prinz. He was the recipient of the Vienna Schubert Prize (1943), the Austrian State Prize (1960), the Vienna Music Prize (1961), the Viennese Gold Medal of Honour (1969) and the Austrian Badge of Honour for Service and Arts (1980). He also served as the president of the Austrian Gesellschaft der Autoren, Komponisten und Musikverleger (1970) and the Künstler-Union (1976).

As a composer, Uhl synthesized elements from neo-classicism, atonality, serialism and traditional tonal and contrapuntal idioms. His vibrant style combined technical sophistication and musical charm with wit and humour, rhythmic inventiveness, thematic development and advanced harmonic language. He wrote eight film scores, one opera, several choral works, and multiple symphonic and chamber music pieces. He wrote extensively for the clarinet, including educational material and works that are still common repertoire. His most famous educational pieces are the two volumes which comprise 48 Studies. His Divertimento for Three Clarinets and Bass Clarinet is one of the most performed works for the medium. Written in 1942 for clarinettists from the Vienna Philharmonic, it is a demanding three-movement work structured similarly to a conventional concerto.

== 48 Studies for clarinet ==
Two volumes of 24 studies each, first published in 1940 by Schott Music, were designed to familiarise the advancing clarinettist with some of the more difficult possibilities being written in modern instrumental music. This is stated by Uhl himself in a foreword to some, but not all editions. As such, they occasionally include intervals which require sliding over keys on the French system of clarinet, a technique that is generally frowned upon unless, as in these cases, it cannot be avoided.

The studies are characterized by their extensive use of neo-romantic chromaticism and rhythmic complexity. Occasionally viewed as less musical and more technical than most studies, some clarinetists consider it a second goal to bring out the musicality of each piece, which may be hidden behind technical complexities.

Uhl was assisted by Leopold Wlach of the Vienna Philharmonic Orchestra, who made suggestions and revisions throughout the writing process.

== Selected works ==
=== Stage ===
- Rondeau, Tänzerische Variationen nach Themen von Molière, Ballet (1949)
- Katzenmusik, Ballet-Opera in 3 scenes (1959); libretto by Karl Friedrich Alys
- Der mysteriöse Herr X, Opera in a prelude and 3 acts (1962–1965); libretto by Theo Lingen

=== Orchestra ===
- Präludium (1929)
- Lobgesang der Arbeit, Symphonic Suite (1938)
- Wiener Walzer (1939)
- Musik der Arbeit for small orchestra (1939)
- 7 Miniatures for chamber orchestra (1944)
- 4 Capricen von Musikanten, fahrenden Sängern, Gauklern und Komödianten (1944–1945)
- Sonate für Orchester (1945)
- Introduktion und Variationen über eine Melodie aus dem 16. Jahrhundert ("Es geht eine dunkle Wolk' herein ...") for string orchestra (1947)
- Concerto a ballo (1966)
- Sinfonietta (1977)
- Drei Skizzen (3 Sketches) (1979–1980)
- Concerto for chamber orchestra (1984)

=== Concertante ===
- Konzertante Sinfonie for clarinet and orchestra (1943); or for bassoon and orchestra (1987)
- Concertino for violin and 22 wind instruments (1949, revised 1986)
- Kleines Konzert for violin and orchestra (1963)

=== Chamber and instrumental music ===
- Andante for cello and organ (1923)
- Andante for violin, cello and organ (or piano) (1923)
- Stimmungsbild for viola and piano (1923)
- String Trio (1923)
- 10 Divertimenti for viola and cello (1924)
- Sarabande for violin and piano (1924)
- Widmung (Dedication) for cello and piano (1924)
- Norwegisches Küstenlied for violin, cello and piano (or organ) (1926)
- Kleine Suite for violin, viola and guitar (1926–1930)
- Piano Quartet in B minor (1927)
- Trio for violin, viola and guitar (1928, 1982)
- Wiener Weisen for violin, viola and guitar (1929)
- Septet for clarinet, 3 violins, 2 violas and cello (1930)
- Sonatina for cello and piano (1931)
- Kleine Burleske for string quartet (1932)
- Rondo for 2 violins (1935)
- Kleines Konzert (Little Concerto) for clarinet, viola and piano (1937, revised 1988); also for violin, cello and piano (1972), or clarinet, alto saxophone and piano (1988)
- Sonata for guitar (1937)
- 10 kleine Stücke for guitar (1937–1939)
- 48 Etüden for clarinet solo (1938)
- Spielmusik for mandoline, violin, viola and cello (1938)
- 5 frohe Weisen für den Wr. Weihnachtsmarkt for 3 oboes, 2 clarinets, 2 bassoons and 2 horns (1939)
- Divertimento for 3 clarinets and bass clarinet (1942)
- Eine vergnügliche Musik for 8 wind instruments (1944)
- String Quartet No. 1 (1945–1946, 1969)
- String Quartet No. 2 "Jubiläumsquartett" (1961)
- 4 Tanzstücke for string quartet, clarinet, bassoon and horn (1963–1964)
- Humoreske for wind quintet (1965)
- Eine vergnügliche Spielmusik for 3 violins and cello (1969)
- Sonata classica for guitar (1969)
- 15 Etüden for bassoon solo (1970)
- 20 Etüden (intermediate to difficult) for viola solo (1971)
- 30 Etüden (easy to intermediate) for viola solo (1972)
- Kleine Suite (from 20 Etüden) for viola solo (1973)
- Drei Stücke (3 Pieces) for flute and guitar (1982)
- Drei Tanzstücke (3 Dance Pieces) for wind octet (1985–1986)
- Commedia musicale for clarinet, viola and piano (1982); also for 2 pianos (1987)
- Scherzo Capriccioso for bassoon (or bass clarinet) and piano (1986); also for wind octet (1989)
- Vier Stücke (4 Pieces) for wind quintet (1990–1991)
- Konzert for bassoon and string quartet (1991–1992); original version: Kleines Konzert for clarinet, viola and piano (1937)

=== Piano ===
- Wiener Weisen (1922)
- Musik zu einem Lustspiel (1925)
- 2. Tanzsuite (Dance Suite No. 2) (1927)
- 4 kleine Stücke (1974)
- Drosser Musettewalzer (1979)
- Commedia musicale for 2 pianos (1982, 1987); original version for clarinet, viola and piano

=== Vocal ===
- Vergänglichkeit for alto (mezzo-soprano) and piano (1922); words by J. M. Wunderlich
- Marienlied for soprano and chamber ensemble (1924); words by J. M. Wunderlich
- Abendlandschaft for soprano and piano (1924); words by Joseph von Eichendorff
- Mittagsruh for soprano and piano (1924); words by Joseph von Eichendorff
- Die Sperlinge for mezzo-soprano and piano (1924); words by Joseph von Eichendorff
- Bitte for voice and piano (1925); words by Nikolaus Lenau
- Frische Fahrt for voice and piano (1925); words by Joseph von Eichendorff
- Gleichheit for soprano and piano (1925); words by Joseph von Eichendorff
- Wegweiser for soprano and piano (1925); words by Joseph von Eichendorff
- Im Walde for mezzo-soprano and piano (1926); words by Joseph von Eichendorff
- Lieblingsplätzchen for voice and piano (1926); words from Des Knaben Wunderhorn
- Abschied for mezzo-soprano and piano (1927); words by Joseph von Eichendorff
- Buße for baritone and piano (1928)
- Herbstweh for mezzo-soprano and piano (1929); words by Joseph von Eichendorff
- Die Schnupftabaksdose for voice and piano (1935); words by Joachim Ringelnatz
- Sehnsucht zurück for voice and piano (1935); words by Herbert Strutz
- Mir ist ein schön's braun Maidelein for voice, violin, viola and cello (1946)
- So ruhig geh ich meinen Pfad for voice and piano (1952); words by Joseph von Eichendorff
- 4 Lieder aus der Heiteren Kantate "Wer Einsam ist, der Hat es Gut" for soprano, viola and piano (1984)

=== Choral ===
- Messe in h-Moll (Mass in B minor) for soloists, chorus, orchestra and organ (1926–1927)
- Gilgamesch, Oratorical Music Drama for soloists, narrator, mixed chorus, children's chorus, orchestra and organ (1954–1955, revised 1967–1968)
- Wer einsam ist, der hat es gut, Cantata for soloists, mixed chorus and orchestra (1960, revised 1963); after poems of Wilhelm Busch, Christian Morgenstern and Joachim Ringelnatz
- Die Zeit for male chorus and piano (1963); words by Christian Morgenstern
- Drei Bagatellen (3 Bagatelles) for mixed chorus a cappella (1970)
- Bumerang for male chorus a cappella (1970); words by Joachim Ringelnatz
- Tierischer Ernst for mixed chorus a cappella (1971); words by Heinrich Gattermeyer
- So ruhig geh' ich meinen Pfad for mixed chorus a cappella (1971)

=== Film scores ===
Year	Original title	English title	Notes
1932	Gebändigte Zeit (Schweizer Uhrenindustrie)		
1932	Der Weg nach dem Süden		
1933	Abessinienflug (Mittelholzer)		
1933	Alpenflug (Mittelholzer)		
1933	Appenzellerland		
1933	Im Dienste des Alltags		
1933	Mensch im Schnee		
1933	Toggenburg		
1935	Seldwyla		
1935	Symphonie des Wassers		
1935	Tessiner Bergbauern		
1935	Tessiner Seen		
1936	Frauennot – Frauenglück		
1936	So lebt China		
1939	Aus Rüstkammern deutscher Vergangenheit		
1939	Fristlos entlassen		
1950	Das gestohlene Jahr		
1951	Schwindel im 3/4-Takt		
1952	Frühlingsstimmen	Voices of Spring	directed by Hans Thimig
1953	Der Verschwender	The Spendthrift	
1957	Hochstätten des Geistes		
1957	Wien, du Stadt meiner Träume	Vienna, City of My Dreams	directed by Willi Forst
1959	Panoptikum 59		directed by Walter Kolm-Veltée

== Honours and awards ==
- State Prize for Music (1953)
- Grand Austrian State Prize for music (along with Theodor Berger) (1959)
- City of Vienna Prize for music (1961)
- Honorary Medal of the capital Vienna in gold (1969)
- President of the AKM (Society of Authors, Composers and Publishers, 1970–75)
- Austrian Cross of Honour for Science and Art, 1st class (1980)

== Sources ==
- J.M. Hinson. The New Grove Dictionary of Opera, edited by Stanley Sadie (1992). ISBN 0-333-73432-7 and ISBN 1-56159-228-5
