= The Big Lebowski (soundtrack) =

The Big Lebowski (Original Motion Picture Soundtrack)

Soundtrack album by various artists
- Released: February 24, 1998
- Genres: Rock; classical; jazz; country; folk; pop
- Length: 51:45
- Label: Mercury
- Producers: T Bone Burnett; Joel Coen; Ethan Coen

The Big Lebowski (Original Motion Picture Soundtrack) is the soundtrack album to the 1998 film The Big Lebowski directed by the Coen brothers. It was released under the Mercury Records label on February 24, 1998, and is produced by T Bone Burnett with the Coens featuring songs ranging from rock, classical, jazz, folk, pop and country music. The album received positive reviews from critics and has been regarded as one of the best soundtracks.

== Development ==
The original score was composed by Carter Burwell, a veteran of all the Coen Brothers' films. While the Coens were writing the screenplay they had Kenny Rogers' "Just Dropped In (To See What Condition My Condition Was In)", the Gipsy Kings' cover of "Hotel California", and several Creedence Clearwater Revival songs in mind. They asked T Bone Burnett (who would later work with the Coens on O Brother, Where Art Thou? and Inside Llewyn Davis) to pick songs for the soundtrack of the film. They knew that they wanted different genres of music from different times but, as Joel remembers, "T Bone even came up with some far-out Henry Mancini and Yma Sumac. Burnett was able to secure songs by Kenny Rogers and the Gipsy Kings and also added tracks by Captain Beefheart, Moondog and Bob Dylan's "The Man in Me". However, he had a tough time securing the rights to Townes Van Zandt's cover of the Rolling Stones' "Dead Flowers", which plays over the film's closing credits. Former Stones manager Allen Klein owned the rights to the song and wanted $150,000 for it. Burnett convinced Klein to watch an early cut of the film and remembers, "It got to the part where the Dude says, 'I hate the fuckin' Eagles, man!' Klein stands up and says, 'That's it, you can have the song!' That was beautiful." Burnett was going to be credited on the film as "Music Supervisor", but asked his credit to be "Music Archivist" because he "hated the notion of being a supervisor; I wouldn't want anyone to think of me as management".

For Joel, "the original music, as with other elements of the movie, had to echo the retro sounds of the Sixties and early Seventies". Music defines each character. For example, Bob Nolan's "Tumbling Tumbleweeds" was chosen for the Stranger at the time the Coens wrote the screenplay, as was Henry Mancini's "Lujon" for Jackie Treehorn. "The German nihilists are accompanied by techno-pop and Jeff Bridges by Creedence. So there's a musical signature for each of them", remarked Ethan in an interview. The character Uli Kunkel was in the German electronic band Autobahn, an homage to the band Kraftwerk. The album cover of their record Nagelbett (bed of nails) is a parody of the Kraftwerk album cover for The Man-Machine and the group name Autobahn shares the name of a Kraftwerk song and album. In the lyrics the phrase "We believe in nothing" is repeated with electronic distortion. This is a reference to Autobahn's nihilism in the film.

== Reception ==
Stephen Thomas Erlewine of AllMusic wrote "The collection makes more sense if you've seen the film, but there are enough good songs and quirky humor to make it an enjoyable listen on its own terms." Tom Taylor of Far Out wrote "In most cases, the alchemical magic of pairing songs with the perfect moment is rousing enough. However, when it comes to The Big Lebowski, the fact that each song also seems fine-tuned with a contextual overture is a truly astounding feat [...] You can dive into the soundtrack and never live to see the bottom, or you can simply float on the surface and listen to the pins fall, any which way, this soundtrack abides." Keith Moerer of Salon.com wrote "The Big Lebowski soundtrack is as strange as a Midwestern landscape populated by lovers, loners, losers and creeps. Sounds like a great movie—or an even better soundtrack—to me."

Bernard Zuel of The Sydney Morning Herald gave three-and-a-half out of five and wrote "The Coen brothers' Big Lebowski provides more eclecticism and humour, with an excerpt from a Gluck opera and Bob Dylan on the bill. It veers from the brilliant (Nina Simone's I Got It Bad And That Ain't Good) to the spookily exotic (Yma Sumac's Ataypura) then abominable (Gipsy Kings' Hotel California), with a few laughs thrown in, such as the faux psych of First Edition's Just Dropped In To See What Condition My Condition Was In and the breathy oddness of Meredith Monk's Walking Song." Ben Sherlock of Screen Rant wrote "The soundtrack full of breezy blues tunes and chill rock ‘n’ roll hits is a big part of the relaxed, easygoing mood of the Coens’ uniquely zany neo-noir."

== Track listing ==
No.	Title	Writer(s)	Performer	Length
1.	"The Man in Me"	Bob Dylan	Dylan	3:08
2.	"Her Eyes Are a Blue Million Miles"	Captain Beefheart	Beefheart	2:54
3.	"My Mood Swings"	Elvis Costello and Cait O'Riordan	Costello	2:10
4.	"Ataypura"	Moises Vivanco	Yma Sumac	3:03
5.	"Traffic Boom"	Piero Piccioni	Piccioni	3:15
6.	"I Got It Bad (and That Ain't Good)"	Duke Ellington and Paul Francis Webster	Nina Simone	4:07
7.	"Stamping Ground" (The track actually includes two songs, starting with "Theme", which then leads to "Stamping Ground")	Moondog	Moondog	5:11
8.	"Just Dropped In (To See What Condition My Condition Was In)"	Mickey Newbury	The First Edition	3:21
9.	"Walking Song"	Meredith Monk	Monk	2:55
10.	"Glück das mir verblieb" (from Die tote Stadt )	Erich Wolfgang Korngold	Ilona Steingruber, Anton Dermota and the Austrian State Radio Orchestra	5:08
11.	"Lujon"	Henry Mancini	Mancini	2:38
12.	"Hotel California"	Don Henley, Glenn Frey and Don Felder	The Gipsy Kings	5:47
13.	"Technopop" (Wie Glauben)	Carter Burwell	Burwell	3:21
14.	"Dead Flowers"	Mick Jagger and Keith Richards	Townes Van Zandt	4:47
Total length:				51:45

== Additional music ==
Other music used (not on soundtrack album)
No.	Title	Writer(s)	Performer	Length
1.	"Tumbling Tumbleweeds"	Bob Nolan	Sons of the Pioneers
2.	"Mucha Muchacha"	Juan García Esquivel	Esquivel
3.	"I Hate You"	Gary Burger, David Havlicek, Roger Johnston, Thomas E. Shaw and Larry Spangler	The Monks
4.	"Requiem in D Minor: Introitus and Lacrimosa"	Wolfgang Amadeus Mozart	The Slovak Philharmonic Orchestra and Choir
5.	"Run Through the Jungle"	John Fogerty	Creedence Clearwater Revival
6.	"Behave Yourself"	Booker T. Jones, Steve Cropper, Al Jackson Jr. and Lewie Steinberg	Booker T. & the MG's
7.	"Standing on the Corner"	Frank Loesser	Dean Martin
8.	"Tammy"	Jay Livingston and Ray Evans	Debbie Reynolds
9.	"We Venerate Thy Cross"	traditional	The Rustavi Choir
10.	"Lookin' Out My Back Door"	John Fogerty	Creedence Clearwater Revival
11.	"Gnomus" (from Pictures at an Exhibition)	Modest Mussorgsky, arranged for orchestra by Maurice Ravel	Royal Concertgebouw Orchestra conducted by Colin Davis
12.	"Oye Como Va"	Tito Puente	Santana
13.	"Piacere Sequence"	Teo Usuelli	Usuelli
14.	"Branded Theme Song"	Alan Alch and Dominic Frontiere
15.	"Peaceful Easy Feeling"	Jack Tempchin	Eagles
16.	"Viva Las Vegas"	Doc Pomus and Mort Shuman	ZZ Top (with Bunny Lebowski); and Shawn Colvin (closing credits).
17.	"Dick on a Case"	Carter Burwell	Burwell

== Chart performance ==
Chart (1998–2020)	Peak position
UK Soundtrack Albums (Official Charts)	39
US Billboard 200	23
US Soundtrack Albums (Billboard)	1
