= Yaron Zilberman =

Israeli film director

- Born: October 2, 1966 (age 59); Haifa, Israel
- Occupation(s): Film director, screenwriter, producer

Yaron Zilberman (Hebrew: ירון זילברמן; born October 2, 1966) is an Israeli-American director, screenwriter and producer.

== Career ==
Zilberman directed, co-wrote and produced A Late Quartet which starred Philip Seymour Hoffman, Christopher Walken, Catherine Keener, Mark Ivanir and Imogen Poots. The film premiered in the Special Presentation program at the 2012 Toronto International Film Festival. Inspired by and structured around Beethoven's Opus 131, the film follows the world-renowned Fugue String Quartet after its cellist Peter Mitchell (Christopher Walken) is diagnosed with Parkinson’s Disease. Cinematographer Frederick Elmes lensed the film and composer Angelo Badalamenti composed the score for the film. The Brentano String Quartet played the quartet music for the soundtrack and Anne Sofie von Otter appears as the cellist's late wife, singing Korngold's "Marietta's Song" from Die tote Stadt. The film was theatrically released in over 30 countries and was critically acclaimed. It was a New York Times Critics Pick. Rolling Stone’s Peter Travers called it “a shining gem of a movie” and Roger Ebert said “it does one of the most interesting things any film can do. It shows how skilled professionals work.”

Zilberman made his directorial debut with his theatrical feature documentary Watermarks (2004), which follows the champion women swimmers of Hakoah Vienna as they reunite at their old swimming pool 65 years after they were forced by the Nazis to flee Austria. Watermarks won nine film festival awards and enjoyed a successful theatrical run internationally.

== Personal life ==
Zilberman lives in New York City with his wife, producer Tamar Sela, and their children.

He is a graduate of the Massachusetts Institute of Technology (MIT).

== Filmography ==
Documentary film

Year	Title	Director	Writer	Producer
2004	Watermarks	Yes	Yes	Yes
2023	Angels	Yes	Yes	Yes

Feature film

Year	Title	Director	Writer	Producer
2012	A Late Quartet	Yes	Yes	Yes
2019	Incitement	Yes	Yes	Yes

Television

Year	Title	Director	Writer	Note
2020	Valley of Tears	Yes	Yes	10 episodes
