= Anelosimus biglebowski =

Scientific classification
- Kingdom: Animalia
- Phylum: Arthropoda
- Subphylum: Chelicerata
- Class: Arachnida
- Order: Araneae
- Infraorder: Araneomorphae
- Family: Theridiidae
- Genus: Anelosimus
- Species: A. biglebowski

Binomial name
- Anelosimus biglebowski Agnarsson, 2006

Species of spider

Anelosimus biglebowski is a species of spider in the family Theridiidae. All specimens known have been found in the Udzungwa Scarp Forest Reserve, Mufindi District, Tanzania. It is named for the 1998 film The Big Lebowski.

== Description ==
Anelosimus biglebowski ranges in total length from 1.80–2.10mm in males and 1.85–2.15mm in females. Coloration of the abdomen is variable in both sexes.

== Habitat and natural history ==
The only known specimens have been collected from mid-elevation rainforest in the Udzungwa Scarp Forest Reserve, most commonly from an elevation of 1650–1730m. There may be a sex ratio of 2.5 females to 1 male. Habitat range is similar to Anelosimus dude, which is also close genetically.
