= Lebowski Fest =

United States festival inspired by the film "The Big Lebowski"

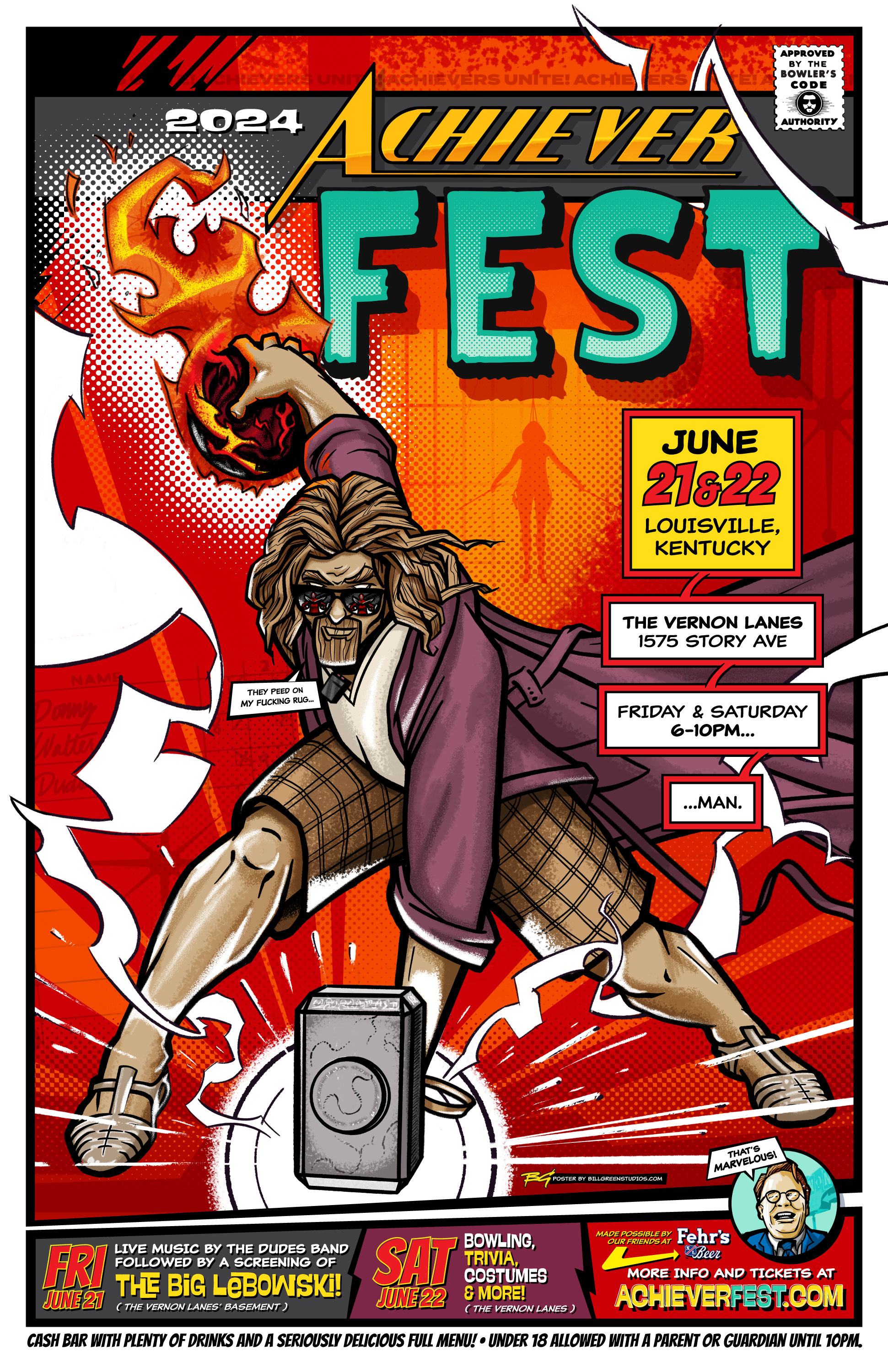
Poster art for Achiever Fest 2024 by Bill Green

Lebowski Fest was an annual festival that began in 2002 in Louisville, Kentucky, celebrating the 1998 cult film The Big Lebowski by Joel Coen and Ethan Coen and was last celebrated in 2018. In addition to its home city of Louisville, Lebowski Fest has been held in Milwaukee, New York, Las Vegas, Los Angeles, Austin, Seattle, Chicago, San Francisco, Portland, London, Boston, New Orleans, Atlanta, Asbury Park, NJ and Pittsburgh.

== Description ==
The annual Lebowski Fest celebrates the 1998 cult film The Big Lebowski by Joel Coen and Ethan Coen. Typically held over two nights, Lebowski Fest features a screening of the film, live music, and a bowling party attended by fans of the movie, many dressed as characters from the film.

== History ==
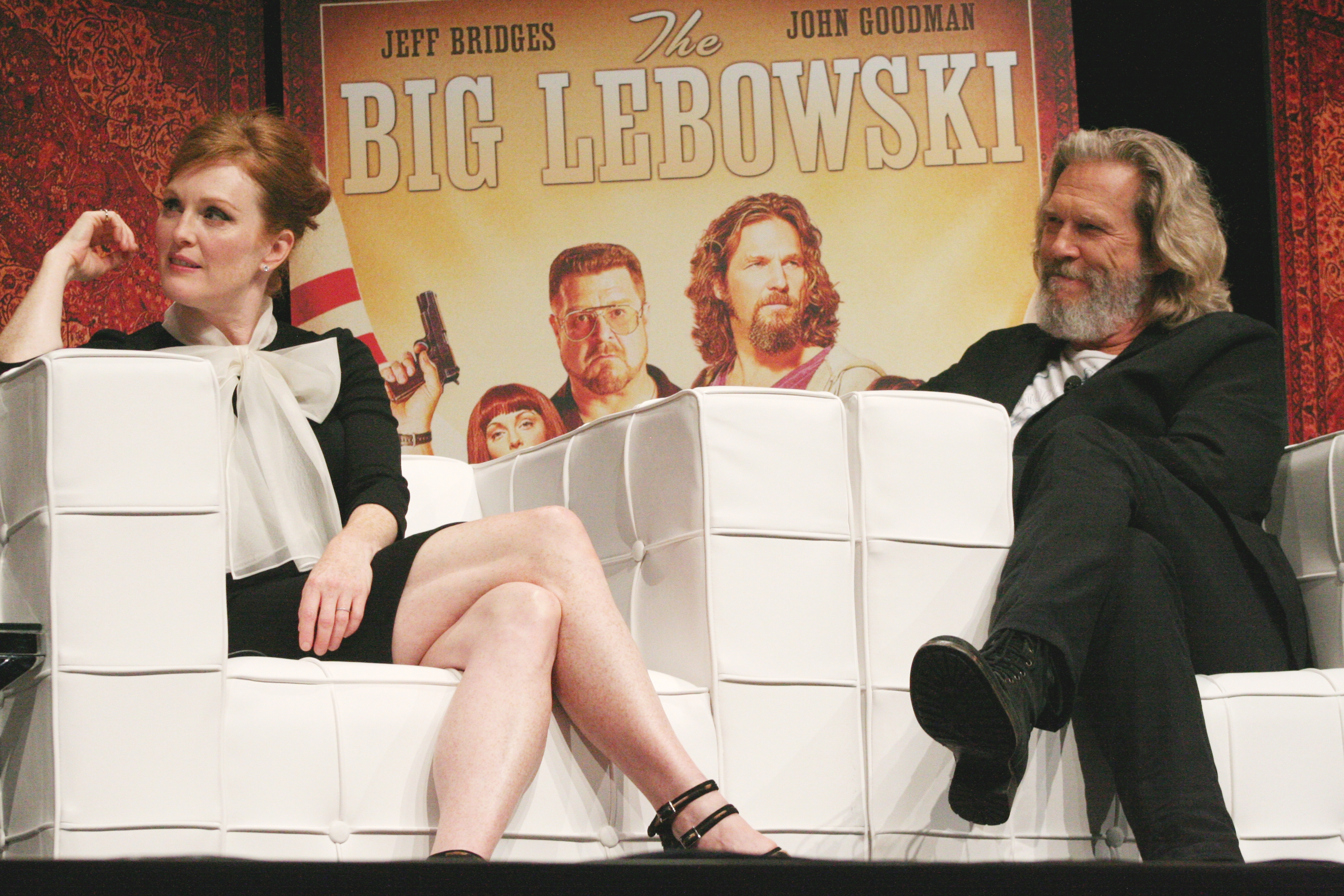
The Big Lebowski cast members Julianne Moore and Jeff Bridges at the 2011 Lebowski Fest.

The festival began in 2002 in Louisville, Kentucky, and has been held in Milwaukee, New York, Las Vegas, Los Angeles, Austin, Seattle, Chicago, San Francisco, Portland, London, Boston, New Orleans, Raleigh, and Pittsburgh.

Various stars from "The Big Lebowski" have attended the fest over the years, including Jeff Bridges, who in 2005 showed up at Lebowski Fest in Los Angeles singing and playing "The Man in Me" by Bob Dylan, which is featured in the film. In 2011, members of the cast reunited at Lebowski Fest in New York, including Bridges, Julianne Moore, John Goodman, Steve Buscemi, and John Turturro.

Lebowski Fest was co-founded by Louisvillians Will Russell and Scott Shuffitt, who, along with Bill Green and Ben Peskoe, authored the book, I'm a Lebowski, You're a Lebowski: Life, The Big Lebowski, and What Have You, described as "a punch-drunk tribute worthy of a bowling-loving stoner named 'the Dude.'" There is also a documentary about Lebowski Fest, entitled The Achievers.

An account of the first ever Lebowski Fest is included in Mike Walsh's non-fiction account of his endeavor to bowl in all 50 U.S. states, Bowling Across America.

Lebowski Fest has also appeared on the Food Network program "Ace of Cakes." The episode named "The Big Cakeowski" features the Charm City Cakes staff creating and delivering a movie-themed cake to Lebowski Fest in Louisville.

The British equivalent, inspired by Lebowski Fest, is known as The Dude Abides and is held in London.

Co-founder Scott Shuffitt has taken the reins in the absence of Lebowski Fest and now holds Achiever Fest yearly in Louisville, Kentucky.

== See also ==
- List of attractions and events in the Louisville metropolitan area
