= Alfred Prinz =

Austrian composer, clarinetist and music educator

Alfred Prinz (4 June 1930 – 20 September 2014) was an Austrian composer, clarinetist, and music educator. In 1947 he was awarded a gold medal at the Geneva Music Competition and in 1971 he won a composition award from the city of Vienna. His compositional output includes 7 symphonies, many concertos, several works for solo piano, songs, and chamber music. In 1998 his Fünf Goethe-Lieder (Five Goethe Songs) were premiered by soprano Caroline Dowd-Higgins for whom Prinz had composed the pieces. As a concert clarinetist, he performed as a soloist with orchestras throughout the world and performed in concerts of chamber music internationally. He recorded for Ariola Records, Decca Records, Deutsche Grammophon, His Master's Voice, and the Telarc International Corporation among other record labels.

Born in Vienna, Prinz began studying the clarinet at the age of 9 at the University of Music and Performing Arts, Vienna with Leopold Wlach of the Vienna Philharmonic. He also earned a diploma in piano performance, studying from 1942 with Bruno Seidlhofer. He later studied music composition under Alfred Uhl and conducting under Hans Swarowsky. In 1945, at the age of 15, he became a clarinetist in the Vienna State Opera Orchestra; and was the youngest performer ever to play for that ensemble. He later was principal clarinetist of the Vienna Philharmonic from 1955 to 1983 and retired in 1995.

As an educator, Prinz taught clarinet at the University of Music and Performing Arts, Vienna since 1972. He had been a visiting professor at the Jacobs School of Music at Indiana University from 1996 until his death. He gave numerous masterclasses at the Mozarteum University of Salzburg and at universities in Finland, Italy, Japan, Switzerland, and the United States.
