= Watermarks (film) =

- Directed by: Yaron Zilberman
- Written by: Ronen Dorfan; Yaron Zilberman; Yonatan Israel
- Produced by: Yonatan Israel; Yaron Zilberman
- Cinematography: Tom Hurwitz
- Edited by: Ruben Korenfeld; Yuval Shar
- Distributed by: Cinephil; Kino International
- Release date: 10 December 2004
- Running time: 80 minutes
- Languages: English; German; Hebrew
- Box office: $246,094

Watermarks is a 2004 award-winning theatrical feature documentary co-written and directed by Yaron Zilberman as his directorial debut. The film reunites the champion women swimmers of the legendary Jewish sports club, Hakoah Vienna, who were forced to disband during the rise of fascism in 1930s Austria.

== Synopsis ==
Watermarks tells the story of the champion women swimmers of Hakoah Vienna. Hakoah was founded in 1909 in response to the notorious Aryan Paragraph, which forbade Austrian sports clubs from accepting Jewish athletes. Its founders were eager to popularize sport among a community renowned for such great minds as Freud, Mahler and Zweig, but traditionally alien to physical recreation. Hakoah rapidly grew into one of Europe's biggest athletic clubs, achieving astonishing success in many diverse sports. In the 1930s Hakoah's best-known triumphs came from its women swimmers, who dominated national competitions in Austria. After the Anschluss, the political unification of Nazi Germany and Austria in 1938, the Nazis shut down the club. The club's functionaries organized for the swimmers to flee Austria to disparate locations in Palestine, Europe, Asia and the United States. Sixty-five years later, director Yaron Zilberman meets the members of the women's swim team in their homes around the world, and arranges for them to have a reunion in their old swimming pool in Vienna. Told by the swimmers, now in their eighties, Watermarks traces back the story of a group of young girls with a passion to be the best.

== Trivia ==
Hakoah means "The Strength" in Hebrew.

One of the women featured in the film, Judith Haspel, was a record-setting swimmer who was selected to represent Austria in the 1936 Summer Olympics in Berlin. She refused to go and was stripped of her records and banned from competition. Her records were reinstated in 1995.

The song that accompany the swimming scene at Amalienbad, Dein ist mein ganzes Herz ("Yours is My Heart Alone"), is from the operetta Das Land des Lächelns composed by Franz Lehár to the lyrics of the first president of Hakoah Vienna, Fritz Löhner-Beda. Löhner-Beda was sent to Auschwitz after the Anschluss where he was shot to death by a Nazi officer for not running quickly enough. Löhner-Beda also wrote the lyrics to the song Buchenwald March to the music of a fellow prisoner and a Viennese cabaret giant, Hermann Leopoldi while they were prisoners at Buchenwald. In the cabaret scene in the film, actor and singer Boris Eder, performs the song as a part of an evening dedicated to the songs of Leopoldi.

When Zilberman started to research the project he was planning to make a film about Hakoah Vienna's soccer team. Only after he met with the women swimmers as part of his research, he realized that their personalities and the story of the women swim team should be the subject of the film.

== Release ==
Watermarks premiered to critical acclaim in 2005 with Stephen Holden of the New York Times saying "Watermarks becomes more than a pointed footnote to the holocaust. It emerges as a surprisingly encouraging reflection on the distance between youth and advanced age." The film went on to receive a 96% critic rating on Rotten Tomatoes. The film was theatrically distributed throughout the U.S. (Kino International), Canada (Mongrel Media) and Europe (Sophie Dulac Distribution), Israel (Cinephil) and Australia (Champions). It was co-produced with ARTE in association with HBO.

== Reception ==
On review aggregator website Rotten Tomatoes, the film holds an approval rating of 96% based on 23 reviews, with an average rating of 7.5/10.

== Awards ==
- Audience Award for Best Documentary, Palm Springs International Film Festival, 2005
- Reader Jury of the "Standard" Honorable Mention, Vienna International Film Festival, 2004
- Audience Award for Best Documentary, Boston Jewish Film Festival, 2004
- Audience Award for Best Documentary, Washington Jewish Film Festival, 2004
- Audience Award for Best Documentary, San Diego Jewish Film Festival, 2005
- Second Prize, Hot Docs International Film Festival, 2005
- Grand Prix du Public, Paris International Cinema Film Festival, 2005
- Grand Prix, Kiev International Documentary Film Festival, 2005
- Portrait de Femme, Provence, France, 2007
- Best Israeli Film, Berlin Jewish Film Festival, 2005
- Honorary Medal, French Parliament, 2007
- Best Cinematography, Jerusalem Film Festival, 2004
- Best Documentary Nominee, Israeli Academy Awards, 2005
