= Orm Finnendahl =

German composer

Orm Finnendahl (born in 1963) is a German composer.

== Life ==
Born in Düsseldorf, von 1983 bis 1990 Finnendahl studied music composition and musicology with Frank Michael Beyer, Carl Dahlhaus and Gösta Neuwirth in Berlin. He then studied from 1995 to 1998 with Helmut Lachenmann at the State University of Music and Performing Arts Stuttgart. From 1988 to 1989 he studied at the California Institute of the Arts in Los Angeles.

He was director of the Kreuzberg sound workshop from 1991 to 1995. He taught at the Electronic Studio of the Technische Universität Berlin and headed the Institute for New Music at the Universität der Künste Berlin from 1996 to 2001. From 2000 to 2004 he was a university lecturer at the Institute for Computer Music and Electronic Media of the Folkwang University of the Arts. In 2004 he became professor for composition at the Hochschule für Musik Freiburg. There he ran the studio for electronic music. Since 2013 Finnendahl has been professor of composition at the Hochschule für Musik und Darstellende Kunst Frankfurt am Main.

== Honours ==
- 1997: Kompositionspreis der Landeshauptstadt Stuttgart
- 1999: Busoni-Kompositionspreis of the Academy of Arts, Berlin
- 2001: Prix Ars Electronica
- 2001: Preisträger CYNETART-Festival in Dresden
