= Anelosimus dude =

Scientific classification
- Kingdom: Animalia
- Phylum: Arthropoda
- Subphylum: Chelicerata
- Class: Arachnida
- Order: Araneae
- Infraorder: Araneomorphae
- Family: Theridiidae
- Genus: Anelosimus
- Species: A. dude

Binomial name
- Anelosimus dude Agnarsson, 2006

Species of spider

Anelosimus dude is a species of spider in the family Theridiidae. It is native to Tanzania, having only been found in the Udzungwa Scarp Forest Reserve and Mazumbai Forest Reserve. It is closely related to Anelosimus biglebowski. The name A. dude derives from "The Dude", a character in the 1998 film The Big Lebowski.

== Biology ==
Anelosimus dude ranges in size from 1.80mm to 2.10mm for male total length and from 1.85mm to 2.15mm for female total length. Coloration is generally grey, but varies greatly. A. dude may have a skewed sex ratio of approximately 2.6 females to 1 male.

== Ecology and habitat ==
Anelosimus dude is found exclusively in mid-elevation rainforest, most commonly from 1370m to 1515m.
