= A Late Quartet =

- Theatrical release poster
- Directed by: Yaron Zilberman
- Written by: Yaron Zilberman; Seth Grossman
- Produced by: Yaron Zilberman; Mandy Tagger; Vanessa Coifman; David Faigenblum; Emanuel Michael; Tamar Sela
- Starring: Philip Seymour Hoffman; Catherine Keener; Christopher Walken
- Cinematography: Frederick Elmes
- Edited by: Yuval Shar
- Music by: Angelo Badalamenti
- Production companies: Opening Night Productions; RKO Pictures
- Distributed by: Entertainment One
- Release dates: September 10, 2012 (TIFF); November 2, 2012
- Running time: 106 minutes
- Country: United States
- Language: English
- Box office: $8 million

A Late Quartet (released in Australia as Performance) is a 2012 American drama film directed by Yaron Zilberman and co-written by Zilberman and Seth Grossman. The film stars Philip Seymour Hoffman, Christopher Walken, Catherine Keener, Mark Ivanir and Imogen Poots.

Inspired by and structured around Beethoven's Op. 131, the film follows the world-renowned Fugue String Quartet after its cellist Peter Mitchell (Walken) is diagnosed with Parkinson's disease. Frederick Elmes served as cinematographer and Angelo Badalamenti composed the score. The Brentano String Quartet played the quartet music for the soundtrack and Anne Sofie von Otter appears as the cellist's late wife, singing Korngold's "Marietta's Song" from Die tote Stadt.

The film premiered in the Special Presentation program at the 2012 Toronto International Film Festival, and was theatrically released in over 30 countries. It received generally positive reviews.

== Plot ==
As the Fugue String quartet approaches its 25th anniversary, the onset of a debilitating illness to cellist Peter Mitchell (Christopher Walken), forces its members to reevaluate their relationships. After being diagnosed with Parkinson's disease, Peter announces his decision to play one final concert before he retires. Meanwhile, the second violinist, Robert (Philip Seymour Hoffman), voices his desire to alternate the first violinist role, long held by Daniel (Mark Ivanir). Robert is married to Juliette (Catherine Keener), the viola player of the group. Upon discovering Juliette does not support him in this matter, Robert has a one-night stand. Juliette tells him to leave the house. Further complicating matters, their daughter, Alexandra (Imogen Poots), begins an affair with Daniel, whom her mother once pined for. When Juliette tells Robert of this affair, Robert punches Daniel, and Peter threatens to cancel the concert.

Their final concert is a performance of Beethoven's String Quartet No. 14. Midway through, Peter withdraws to be replaced by Nina, another cellist.

== Cast ==
- Philip Seymour Hoffman as Robert Gelbart (Violin 2)
- Christopher Walken as Peter Mitchell (Cello)
- Catherine Keener as Juliette Gelbart (Viola)
- Mark Ivanir as Daniel Lerner (Violin 1)
- Imogen Poots as Alexandra Gelbart
- Anne Sofie von Otter as Miriam
- Madhur Jaffrey as Dr. Nadir
- Liraz Charhi as Pilar
- Wallace Shawn as Gideon Rosen
- Nina Lee (of the Brentano String Quartet) as herself, in the closing scene

== Production ==
=== Development ===
To learn how to play the string instruments, the actors had individual coaches who specialized in their respective instruments. Zilberman filmed the Brentano String Quartet perform Op. 131 with five cameras capturing five separate angles, which he then edited into "video-boards" that the actors studied. The aide helped them simulate their individual shots during production.

=== Casting ===
The principal cast was announced in January 2011. The film features members of the Brooklyn Parkinson's Group in the scene where Peter is in a physical therapy class. For the scenes where Peter's Parkinson's becomes apparent, there were two coaches on set, Pamela Quinn and Joy Esterberg. Nina Lee, cellist of the Brentano String Quartet, plays herself in the film. David Redden, legendary auctioneer and Vice-Chairman of Sotheby's, also plays himself in the film. Members of the Attacca String Quartet play student musicians in the Juilliard class scenes.

=== Filming ===
Principal photography began in January 2011. The film's stage performances were filmed in the Metropolitan Museum of Art's Grace Rainey Rogers Auditorium, the same stage where the Guarneri Quartet gave its farewell concert in 2009. A Late Quartet was the first production for which the Frick Collection allowed producers to shoot inside its building.

=== Writing ===
The scene in which Peter Mitchell tells his music class an anecdote about meeting Pablo Casals is adapted from an anecdote found in Cellist, the autobiography of cellist Gregor Piatigorsky; the circumstances of the encounter and the pieces played are changed in the film, but Casals's words are essentially identical to those recounted by Piatigorsky.

The subway poetry the Little Girl reads from when Juliette visits Peter is from Ogden Nash's poem "Old Men". T. S. Eliot's Four Quartets, which Peter reads from at the beginning of the film, itself was inspired by Beethoven's late quartets.

== Soundtrack ==
- Ludwig van Beethoven: String Quartet No. 14 in C-sharp minor, Op. 131, performed by the Brentano String Quartet
- Joseph Haydn: String Quartet No. 5 in F minor, 3rd movement, performed by the Brentano String Quartet
- Uri Caine: "City Nights", performed by Uri Caine
- Cristian Puig: "Bulerias Del Encuentro" (flamenco), performed by Cristian Puig and Rebeca Tomas
- Pablo de Sarasate: "Zigeunerweisen", Op. 20, performed by Mark Steinberg
- Jonathan Dagan: "Salty Air" (from Rivers and Homes), performed by j.viewz
- Johann Sebastian Bach: Cello Suite No. 4 in E-flat major, BWV 1010, performed by Nina Lee (Brentano String Quartet)
- Erich Korngold: "Marietta's Song" from Die tote Stadt, performed by Anne Sofie von Otter (mezzo-soprano), Bengt Forsberg (piano), Kjell Lysell and Ulf Forsberg (violins), Nils-Erik Sparf (viola), Mats Lidström (cello)

== Reception ==
A Late Quartet received generally positive reviews. On Rotten Tomatoes it has an approval rating of 77% based on reviews from 111 critics. The website's critics consensus reads, "An outstanding ensemble cast lends weight and depth to A Late Quartet's melodramatic script, and the result is insightful and emotionally satisfying." On Metacritic, the film has a score of 67 out of 100 based on reviews from 31 critics, indicating "generally favourable reviews".

It was a New York Times Critics' Pick which Stephen Holden called a magnificently acted, "deeply felt, musically savvy film". Rolling Stone's Peter Travers called it "a shining gem of a movie". Roger Ebert said "it does one of the most interesting things any film can do. It shows how skilled professionals work."

== See also ==
- Late string quartets (Beethoven)
