= Ilona Steingruber =

Austrian soprano (1912–1962)

- Born: February 8, 1912; Vienna, Austria-Hungary
- Died: December 12, 1962 (aged 50); Vienna, Austria
- Education: University of Music and Performing Arts Vienna
- Occupation: Operatic soprano
- Spouse: Friedrich Wildgans (m. 1946)

Ilona Steingruber, also known by her married name Ilona Steingruber-Wildgans, (8 February 1912 – 12 December 1962) was an Austrian soprano.

== Early life and career ==
Ilona Steingruber was born in Vienna on 8 February 1912. She initially intended to become a concert pianist before switching to pursuing a career as a singer. She was educated in her native city at the Academy of Music (now the University of Music and Performing Arts Vienna). She was a regular performer on the government-run radio station in Vienna, Reichssender Wien, from 1939 to 1942. She made her opera debut at the Stadttheater Tilsit (then known as the Grenzlandtheater von Tilsit) in 1942.

== Post-war career ==
After the end of World War II, Steingruber became known as a concert soprano who was most often heard in works by contemporary living composers. She gave several concert tours of Europe, and was often heard in major concert venues in France from 1951 to 1957. She also had a concurrent career in opera as a coloratura soprano. She was a resident artist at the Vienna State Opera from 1948 to 1951, and again from 1959 to 1962. She also worked as a guest at the Prague State Opera and La Monnaie in Brussels, and was highly active as a concert and oratorio soprano in Holland and Belgium.

Under conductor Wilhelm Furtwängler Steingruber performed in The Ring Cycle at La Scala in Milan in 1950. She gave performances at the Salzburg Festival in 1952 and 1959. She was a frequent recurring guest at the Teatro Massimo in Palermo from 1951 to 1957.

== Recordings ==
Steingruber recorded the aria "Glück, das mir verblieb" from the opera Die tote Stadt in 1949 under the baton of the composer, Erich Wolfgang Korngold. This recording was later used in the soundtrack to the film The Big Lebowski (1998). In 1951 she recorded both Beethoven's Missa solemnis and Mahler's Symphony No. 2 with the Vienna Symphony led by Otto Klemperer. In 1954 she recorded Schoenberg's Moses und Aron for the Nordwestdeutscher Rundfunk. She also appears on complete opera recordings of Bartok's Bluebeard's Castle, Schubert's Die Verschworenen, and Berg's Lulu (1951, with Dimitri Mitropoulos).

== Personal life and death ==
In addition to performing, Steingruber taught summer music courses at the Technische Universität Darmstadt in the 1950s. In 1946 she married the composer and clarinetist Friedrich Wildgans who was the son of poet Anton Wildgans.

Steingruber died on 12 December 1962 in Vienna at the age of 50.
