= Thomas Schmidt-Kowalski =

German composer (1949–2013)

Thomas Schmidt-Kowalski (21 June 1949 – 5 January 2013) was a German composer.

Schmidt-Kowalski was born at Oldenburg in 1949. He studied composition at the Academy of Music and Dramatic Arts in Berlin under Frank Michael Beyer (1971) and at the Musikhochschule Hannover under Alfred Koerppen (1972–77). In the course of his studies, Schmidt-Kowalski turned from the musical avant-garde and chose to write in a more traditional vein. Since the late 1970s he worked as a freelance composer, mainly writing commissioned works for soloists and events. His compositions have been performed in London, Oxford, Cambridge, Sydney, Melbourne, Mexico City, and Yokohama, and have been recorded on the Naxos label. Schmidt-Kowalski latterly emerged as a conductor of his own works.

== Tonal language ==
Schmidt-Kowalski's works are fully tonal, and their design and harmony is essentially derived from 19th-century practice, with emphasis on the melodic element. He saw the musical Romantic not as an era, but as transcending time, and thus did not consider his tonality and romanticism to be at all nostalgic. His output focused on chamber and orchestral music.

His style has been compared to those of Schumann, Dvořák, and Saint-Saëns. In the view of critic Jill Barlow, Schmidt-Kowalski "manages to bypass 20th-century modernism by doing a 'Sturm und Drang' of his own in 21st-century terms, making himself a 'must' for today's German concert, disc, and radio audiences."
