= Rudolf Jettel =

Austrian composer and clarinetist

Rudolf Jettel (21 March 1903 – 23 November 1981) was an Austrian composer, clarinettist and academic teacher.

== Life and career ==
Born in Vienna, Favoriten district, Jettel trained as an instrument maker and studied clarinet and composition at the then University of Music and Performing Arts Vienna, among others with Viktor Polatschek (1889–1948).

Jettel was solo clarinettist of the Vienna Philharmonic until 1968 and held a teaching position at the University of Music and Performing Arts Vienna from 1957 to 1977. His students included the later solo clarinettists of the Vienna Philharmonic and university professors Peter Schmidl and Horst Hajek, as well as the later solo clarinettist of the Vienna Symphony and the Berlin Philharmonic and university professor Alois Brandhofer.

He was intensively engaged in the construction and development of woodwind instruments.

He composed various chamber music, such as string quartets, wind quintets and sonatas. In particular, his fundamental pedagogical works for clarinet and saxophone are recognised in the professional world. Furthermore, he also wrote works for plucked instruments such as mandolins.

Jettel died in Vienna at the age of 78.

== Compositions ==
=== For clarinet ===
- Almdudeln
- Klarinarrisch
- Klappenschreck

=== For saxophone ===
- Notturno
- Berceuse
- Russian River
- Lucky Vienna

== Awards ==
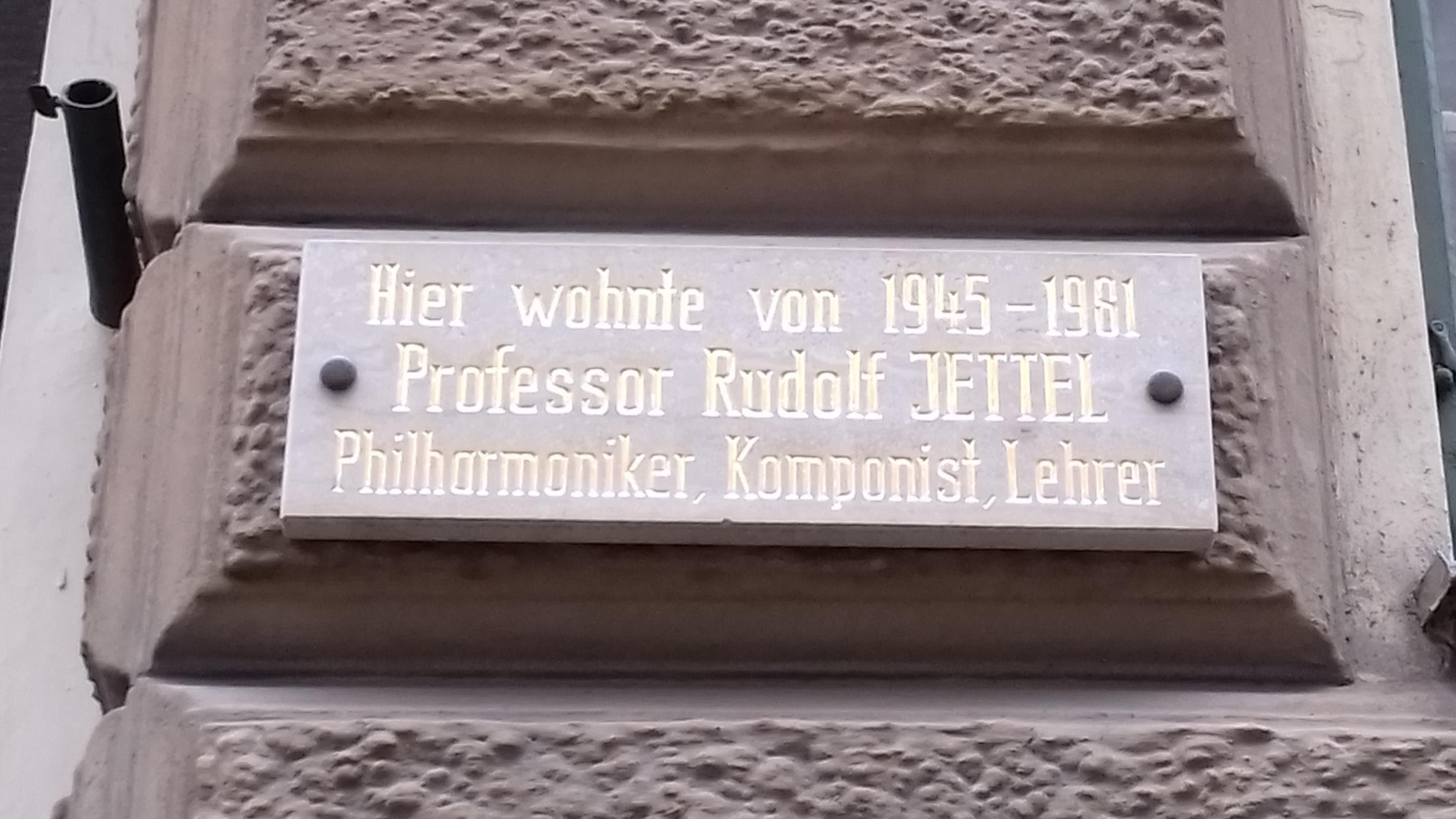
Commemorative plaque on the house in Apfelgasse

- 1967: Silbernes Ehrenzeichen des Landes Salzburg.
- Verleihung des Berufstitel Professor.
- Silver Decoration of Honour for Services to the Republic of Austria.
