= Richard Dünser =

Austrian composer

- Born: 1 May 1959 (age 66); Bregenz, Austria
- Education: Vorarlberger Landeskonservatorium; Vienna Academy of Music
- Occupations: Classical composer; Academic teacher
- Organizations: Mozarteum
- Awards: Ernst-Krenek-Preis; Cross of Honour for Science and Art

Richard Dünser (born 1 May 1959) is an Austrian composer of stage works, orchestral music and chamber music, among others.

== Life ==
Born in Bregenz, Dünser studied composition after his Matura first at the Conservatory of his hometown and later at the Vienna Academy of Music with Francis Burt. From 1985 to 1987, he studied composition with Hans Werner Henze at the Hochschule für Musik Köln, and in 1987 he was a composition fellow there. He was for a summer composition scholar in Tanglewood, U.S.

From 1987, he taught composition at the Innsbruck department of the Mozarteum University Salzburg as well as at the Vorarlberg State Conservatory, and in 1991 he was appointed professor of music theory at the University of Music and Performing Arts Graz, where he has also led a composition class since 2004. Dünser was composer in residence of the Wiener Konzertverein (the chamber orchestra of the Vienna Symphony Orchestra) and, with Christian Roscheck, co-initiator of the concert series of the same name at the Wiener Musikverein (Brahmssaal).

His most important works, which have been interpreted by international ensembles, conductors and soloists, include the orchestral piece Der Wanderer (commissioned by the Neue Arbeiterzeitung in 1986 and premiered by the Vienna Symphony Orchestra in 1988), the string quartet "Elegie. An Diotima" (premiere 1987), the violin concerto premiered at the Bregenz Festival in 1993, his version of the Schubert's Der Graf von Gleichen, which was premiered at the Graz Styriarte in 1997 and was heard in a new version at the Bregenz Festival in 2003, and the ensemble piece "...breeding lilacs out of the dead land...", commissioned by the Klangforum Wien and premiered at the Konzerthaus there. (1998). In recent years, his works have included "Threnody" for flute, clarinet and guitar (1999), The Waste Land for orchestra (2003, Bregenz Festival) and the "Ophelia music for guitar", "Shell Hat and Sandal Slipper", which received its world premiere in London in October 2003 by Alexander Swete and was also performed at the Vienna Konzerthaus a year later. His opera Radek was premiered at the 2006 Bregenz Festival, a commission in co-production with the Neue Oper Wien. He also composed works for chamber orchestra and chamber ensemble, song cycles and chamber music for various instruments.

In 2022 he was awarded the Austrian Cross of Honour for Science and Art.

== Richard Dünser about his work ==
In my work, external musical elements always play an important role: autobiographical sketches, literary references, images, moods.... They penetrate the work and, together with the structures inherent in it, create a fabric, a network of relationships and mutual influences.
Everything grows into one another and forms a larger, superordinate whole that can also dialectically include its opposite, ruptures, unrelatedness, fragmentation.
At first hearing, the various figures seem quite free, but they are very often subject to a precise formal plan:
Developments, processes, atmospheric sound islands, outbreaks, silences are built into a multi-layered architecture of the composition.
Distant mirror images, mirages, mirages, the remembered, the disappeared, the reappeared appear as if from dark dreams and form the mental landmarks and sounds from the innermost.
My music wants to reach out to listeners and viewers, achieve resonance and social relevance, win the audience as a partner without pandering to them; evoke reflection, sadness, but also enthusiasm and understanding. My ideal is that of a work of art that focuses and bundles all the parameters of music (and sometimes of theatre, literature, the visual arts) in an overall dramaturgy, summing them up on a higher level and allowing them to interact.
To this end, the compositional technique must be a complex one, exploring the totality of means, but tamed by a will to unity in diversity, with the aim of subordinating all means to a dramaturgical whole.

— Richard Dünser

== Awards ==
- 1984: Förderungspreis der Stadt Wien.
- 1988: Staatsstipendium für Komposition
- 1989: Österreichischer Würdigungspreis für Musik for String Quartet No. 1
- 2000: Ernst-und-Rosa-von-Dombrowski-Stiftungspreis for Music
- 2010: Ernst-Krenek-Preis
- 2024: Austrian Decoration for Science and Art

== Compositions ==
=== Opera ===
- Radek – one act chamber opera – text: Thomas Höft, Edition Peters (2006).
- Der Graf von Gleichen – opera in two acts after the sketches by Franz Schubert, D 918, Edition Gravis (2002–2003).
- Szene am Teich – opera scene – text: Michael Jakob, Reinhold Lenz, Edition Gravis (1986).

=== Orchestral music ===
- Der Wanderer – Hymne für Orchester – text: Friedrich Hölderlin, Edition Gravis (1986–1987).
- Fantasie in f-moll – (Franz Schubert), Bearb. für Orchester, Edition Gravis (1987).
- Suite für Streichorchester – after five harpsichord sonatas by Domenico Scarlatti, Edition Gravis (1988).
- Aubes I. – Dialogues for saxophone quartet and string orchestra, Edition Gravis (1995).
- Aubes II. – Dialogues for chamber orchestra, Edition Gravis (1996).
- Nebensonnen – for string orchestra, South Styria Press / Eigenverlag (2002).
- The Waste Land – for orchestra, Edition Gravis (2003).

=== Solo concertos ===
- Sinfonietta concertante – for clarinet and string orchestra, Edition Gravis (1985) premiere with Alois Brandhofer, clarinet.
- Nacht-Triptychon – for chamber ensemble, Edition Gravis (1989–1990).
- Violin Concerto, Edition Gravis (1992–1993).

=== Ensemble music ===
- Hymnus – for large wind ensemble, Edition Gravis (1989)
- ...breeding lilacs out of the dead land...., Edition Gravis (1997–1998)

=== Chamber music ===
- Drei Variationen nach alten Volksliedern – for three guitars, Musikverlag Doblinger, Vienna (1979/1983)
- Caravallium – for brass quintet, Verlag Doblinger (1984)
- Zwieklang – for violin and piano, Verlag Doblinger (1985)
- Elegie. An Diotima. – String Quartet No. 1, Edition Gravis (1986/1993)
- Streichquartett Nr. 2, Edition Gravis (1988)
- Tage- und Nachtbücher – for clarinet, violoncello and piano, Verlag Doblinger
- Personae – Five Pieces for Saxophone quartet, Edition Gravis (1990)
- Sestina – for organ and three percussionists, Edition Gravis (1990)
- Threnodie – for flute, clarinet and guitar, Verlag Doblinger (1999)
- Quatre Preludes – (Claude Debussy) for flute, clarinet and guitar, Verlag Doblinger (1999)
- ...fresque de rêve... – for Septet, Verlag Doblinger (2001)

=== Solo works ===
- Drei Inventionen für Klavier, Ed. Helbling Verlagsgesellschaft (1980–1981).
- The Host of the Air – für Horn solo, Verlag Doblinger (1988).
- Erinnerung–Monument–Nachtgesang – Drei Klavierstücke, Edition Gravis (1989).
- Quatre Tombeaux – für Gitarre, Verlag Doblinger (1993–1994).
- Muschelhut und Sandelschuh – Opheliamusik I, Edition Peters (2003/2010).
- Memories. Dark Twilight – für Klavier, Verlag Doblinger (2006).

=== Vocal works ===
- Die letzten Dinge – four Lieder for baritone and piano after texts by Thomas Höft, Verlag Doblinger, Vienna (2002)
- Da unten im Tale – 14 Deutsche Volkslieder – (Johannes Brahms) Bearbeitung, Edition Gravis (2003)
- Doch atmet kalt mein Abend schon. Vier ernste Gesänge für Mezzosopran und Orchester, Edition Gravis, Bad Schwalbach
- Ich var uf der toren vart – Süsskind Szenen für Mezzosopran und Kammerensemble, South Styria Press / Eigenverlag (2003)
- Geh unter schöne Sonne (Friedrich Hölderlin), Lied for soprano and piano, South Styria Press
