= Frank Michael Beyer =

German composer (1928–2008)

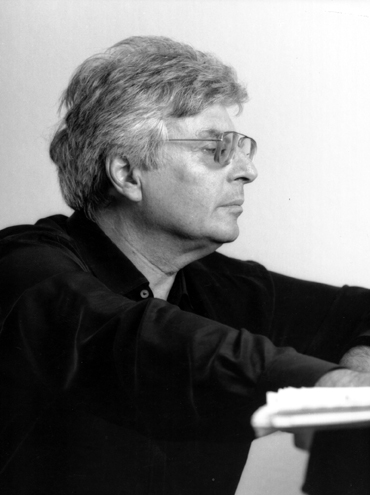
Frank Michael Beyer in 1993

Frank Michael Beyer (8 March 1928 – 20 April 2008) was a German composer.

Active as well as a composition teacher, performer and culture functionary, he was one of the leading figures in post-war Berlin musical life. His works have been programmed by many artists of international renown, and he has left an abundant oeuvre comprising works of all genres except opera. His avant-garde compositional style is clear, strict and sensitive, rooted in German modernism as well as in Bachian counterpoint and characteristics of human speech.

== Life ==
Beyer was born in Berlin, the son of the author and art historian Oskar Beyer and his wife Margarete, née Löwenfeld. He spent his childhood in Dresden and on Crete, as well as in Athens and Liechtenstein and received his early training in music from his father. From 1946 to 1949 he studied composition and church music at the Kirchenmusikschule Berlin, before going on to study the piano in Leipzig from 1950 to 1953.

Beyer pursued his composition studies in Berlin under Ernst Pepping and 'virtuoso organ playing' under Joseph Ahrens at the Hochschule for Musik Berlin (now the Berlin University of the Arts). Johann Sebastian Bach and the Second Viennese School, especially Anton Webern, numbered among the composers who had the greatest influence on Beyer’s musical development. A strong focus on music in the family home also played a key role. He became acquainted with Bach’s music during his childhood while his father published a book on Bach which appeared in the Berlin Furche-Verlag in the 1920s.

From 1950 to 1963, Beyer worked as a church musician, both as performing organist and a conductor. He taught at the Kirchenmusikschule Berlin and subsequently at the Hochschule der Künste Berlin (Berlin University of the Arts). In 1964, he established the Musica nova sacra series and was a leading member of the Berliner Bach-Tage festival from 1970 to 1985. From 1986 to 2003, he was director of the music department at the Berlin University of the Arts. He founded the Institute for New Music in 1990 at the Berlin University of the Arts and the Berliner Orchesterkonferenz, which he also led. From 1986 to 2006, he was a member of the senate at the Berlin University of the Arts. Beyer was also on the supervisory board of the German collecting society for music rights GEMA.

He died in Berlin.

== Selected awards and honours ==
- 1958 Kunstpreis der Stadt Berlin for die Junge Generation (Berlin Art Prize for the Young Generation)
- 1961 Bernhard Sprengel prize for chamber music
- 1963 Villa Massimo fellowship (Rome); Villa Romana fellowship (Florence)
- 1968 fellowship from the Cité des Arts Paris
- Member of the Berlin Academy of the Arts from 1979
- Member of the Bayerische Akademie der Schönen Künste (Bavarian Academy of Fine Arts) from 1981
- 1997 guest of honour of the Villa Massimo (Rome)

== List of works ==
=== Ballet ===
- Geburt des Tanzes (1987), FP (under the ballet title "Orphische Szene") 1988, Deutsche Oper Berlin / Choreography: Tom Schilling
- Das Fenster (1991), features music from "Griechenland" (1981) and "Action" (1991), FP 1992 Hannover

=== Orchestra ===
- Rondeau imaginaire (1972), FP 1973, Berlin Radio Symphony Orchestra (West Berlin) / Lorin Maazel
- Diaphonie (1975), FP 1976, Nuremberg Philharmonic Orchestra / Jiří Bělohlávek
- Notre-Dame-Musik (1983/84), FP 1984, Saarbrücken Radio Symphony Orchestra / Hubert Soudant
- Geburt des Tanzes (1987, based on the ballet), FP 1989, Berlin Radio Symphony Orchestra (West Berlin) / Lothar Zagrosek
- Klangtore (1996, rev.2001), FP 1997, Deutsches Symphonie-Orchester Berlin / Lothar Zagrosek
- Fuga fiammata (1999/2000), FP 2001, Symphonieorchester des Bayerischen Rundfunks / Ulf Schirmer

=== Chamber orchestra ===
- Ricercare I (1957), FP 1958, Berlin Radio Symphony Orchestra (West Berlin) / Wolfgang Sawallisch
- Versi (1968), FP 1968, Berlin Philharmonic / Hans Zender
- Concertino a tre (1974), FP 1974 Schwetzingen
- Streicherfantasien nach einem Motiv von J. S. Bach (1977, also arrangement for string quintet), FP 1980, Berlin Philharmonic / Giuseppe Sinopoli
- Griechenland, Music for 3 groups of strings (1981), FP 1982, Berlin Philharmonic / Seiji Ozawa
- Liturgia (based on String Quartet No. 3 “Missa”) (1996), FP 1997, Berlin Radio Symphony Orchestra / Lawrence Foster
- Passionato con Arietta, Elegy for strings (2005), FP 2006 Diez an der Lahn

=== Solo instrument(s) and orchestra ===
- Concerto for flute and string orchestra (1967)
- Deutsche Tänze for cello and double bass with chamber orchestra (1982), FP 1984 Berlin
- Mysteriensonate for orchestra with solo viola (1986), FP 1987, Berlin Radio Symphony Orchestra (West Berlin) / Sylvain Cambreling
- Concerto for oboe and string orchestra (1986), FP 1987, Hansjörg Schellenberger / Berlin Philharmonic / Erich Leinsdorf
- Musik der Frühe, Concerto for violin and orchestra (1992/93), FP 1993, Kolja Blacher / Rundfunk-Sinfonieorchester Berlin / Hanns-Martin Schneidt
- Canto di giorno for cello and orchestra (1998/99), FP 1999, Michael Sanderling / Berlin Radio Symphony Orchestra / Giuseppe Mega
- Canzona di Ombra for oboe and strings (cadenza and final movement from Concerto for oboe and string orchestra, 1986/2003)
- Concerto Notte di pasqua for viola and orchestra (2003–04/06), FP 2007, Tabea Zimmermann / Deutsches Symphonie-Orchester Berlin / Jonathan Stockhammer
- Meridian, Concerto for flute and string ensemble (2004/05), FP 2008, Emmanuel Pahud / Kammerakademie Potsdam / Michael Sanderling

=== Ensemble and chamber music ===
- String Quartet No. 1 (1954/56)
- Sonata for viola and organ (1962)
- Tiento for flute and organ (1965)
- Concerto for organ and seven instruments (1966/69) FP 1969 Peter Schwarz / Kassel Ensemble
- String Quartet No. 2 (1969) FP 1969 Assmann Quartet, Berlin
- Wind Quintet (1972) FP 1973 Berlin, SWF Baden-Baden Wind Quintet
- Violin Sonata (1977) FP 1978 Berlin, Saschko Gawriloff / Lothar Broddack
- De lumine, Music for chamber ensemble (1978) FP 1979 „das neue Werk“ Hamburg / Dieter Cichewiecz
- Trio for oboe, viola and harp (1980) FP 1981 Mannheim, Heinz Holliger / Ursula Holliger
- Deutsche Tänze for cello and double bass (1980) FP 1980 Vienna, Jörg Baumann / Klaus Stoll
- Fantasia concertante for 2 violins (1982) FP 1984 Hofheim, Boeckheler / Assmann
- Passacaglia fantastica for piano trio (1984) FP 1986 Ludwigsburg, Stuttgart Piano Trio
- String Quartet No. 3 Missa (1985) FP 1985 Berlin, Wilanow Quartet
- Symphonies for Eight Voices (1988) FP 1989, Scharoun Ensemble Berlin
- Architettura per musica for ensemble (1989) FP 1989 Berlin, musica-viva Ensemble Dresden
- Sanctus for saxophone quartet (1990)
- Gesta Romanorum for ensemble (1990)
- Action for percussion ensemble (1991) FP 1993, Super Nova Percussion Ensemble Berlin
- Canciones for clarinet and ensemble (1991) FP 1991, Alois Brandhofer / Berlin Philharmonic / Peter Keuschnig
- Clarinet Quintet (1992) FP 1993 Stuttgart, Ulf Rodenhäuser
- Nachtstück for oboe and piano (1993) FP 1994 Düsseldorf, Christian Schneider / Frank Michael Beyer
- Nänie for 2 guitars (1994) FP 1994 Lüneburg, Evers / Weigel
- Taglied for cello and piano (1998) FP 1998 Berlin, Georg Faust / Rolf Koenen
- „Windklang“ for string trio (2000) FP 2003 Stuttgart, Ingolf Turban / Kolja Lessing / Wen-Sinn Yang
- Was Orpheus sah for string quartet (2003) FP 2004 Berlin, Vogler-Quartett
- Voca for 3 trumpets (2004) FP 2004 Hamburg
- Lichtspuren for piano trio (2006) FP 2008 Kempen, Trio Wanderer
- Zu den Inseln, Suite for 9 instruments (2005/06) FP 2008 München, Konstantia Gourzi, cond.
- Choreographie, Three Mythical Dances for 12 cellos (2007)

=== Solo instruments ===
- Toccata in Re for organ (1952) FP 1953 Berlin, Frank Michael Beyer
- Lays for organ (1957)
- Variationen for piano (1957)
- Toccaten sub communione for organ (1970) FP 1970 Nuremberg, Peter Schwarz
- Chaconne (1970)
- Tiento II for organ (1972) FP 1973 Berlin, Frank Michael Beyer
- Canti dei misteri for organ (1979)
- Messesätze (Josquin/Beyer) for organ (1979)
- Canzonetta for guitar (1980)
- Avanti, 15 Piano Pieces for Young Players (1983)
- Melos I & II for viola (1983/1990)
- Das Geläut zu Speyer for organ (1984)
- Echo for bass flute (1985)
- Lobgesang „Wurze des Waldes“ for organ (1992)
- Imago for cello (2002)
- Wie ein fernes Lied for oboe (cadenza from Concerto for oboe and string orchestra, for separate performance, 2004/05)
- Metamorphosen – Hommage à A. Skrjabin for violin (2007) FP 2008 Berlin, Viviane Hagner

=== Voice ===
- Biblische Szenen for mezzo-soprano and tenor (or soprano and baritone) and ensemble (1955)
- Sprache der Liebenden for baritone, chamber chorus and orchestra (1961); words by Friedrich Hölderlin
- Lavatio – Manifestatio Christi for mixed chorus a cappella (1962)
- Maior Angelis for soprano, female chorus and ensemble (1970) FP 1970 Berlin, Catherine Gayer / Kammerchor Ernst Senff / Frank Michael Beyer
- Canticum Mose et Agni for eight-part chorus a cappella (1976) FP 1977 Berlin, Monteverdi Choir / John Eliot Gardiner
- Et resurrexit, Motets for twelve-part chorus a cappella (2001/02) FP 2003, Rundfunkchor Berlin / Simon Halsey

=== Arrangements ===
- Drei Psalmen for baritone and piano by Boris Blacher, arranged for baritone and ensemble by Frank Michael Beyer (1943, arr.1966)
- Musikalisches Opfer, The Contrapunctual Movements: Ricercare a 3, Fuga canonica & 9 Kanons, by Johann Sebastian Bach, arranged for chamber orchestra by Frank Michael Beyer for performance together with Bach’s Ricercare a 6 in the arrangement by Anton Webern (arr.1985) FP 1985 Berlin, London Sinfonietta / Diego Masson
- Cadenza dolce for the Andante in C Major for flute and orchestra K315 by Wolfgang Amadeus Mozart (2007) FP 2008 Berlin, Emmanuel Pahud

== Students ==
- Nikolaus Brass (1949)
- Orm Finnendahl (1963)
- Detlev Glanert (1960)
- Konstantia Gourzi (1962)
- Hanspeter Kyburz (1960)
- Marc Lingk (1964)
- Gerhardt Müller-Goldboom (1953)
- Isabel Mundry (1963)
- Thomas Schmidt-Kowalski (1949)
- Charlotte Seither (1965)
- Preethi de Silva (1942)
- Art-Oliver Simon (1966)
- André Werner (1960)

== Literature ==
- Werner Grünzweig & Daniela Reinhold (ed.): "Frank Michael Beyer". Archive zur Musik des 20. Jahrhunderts. Vol.2. Wolke Verlag, 1998, ISBN 3-923997-82-5.
- Andreas Richter: "Der Komponist und Vorsitzende der Berliner Orchesterkonferenz Frank Michael Beyer im Gespräch", in Das Orchester 01/1995.
- Alain Pâris: Klassische Musik im 20. Jahrhundert. Instrumentalisten, Sänger, Dirigenten, Orchester, Chöre. transl. by Rudolf Kimmig, rev. by Ralf Noltensmeier. With an introduction by Peter Gülke, Deutscher Taschenbuch Verlag, 2nd edition 1997, ISBN 3-423-32501-1.
