= Viktor Polatschek =

Austrian clarinetist

Viktor Polatschek (29 January 1889 – 27 July 1948) was an Austrian clarinetist and clarinet teacher. He was principal clarinetist with the Vienna State Opera/the Vienna Philharmonics and the Boston Symphony Orchestra.

== Life ==
=== Vienna ===
Born in Chotzen, Böhmen (today Choceň), Polatschek began studying clarinet in 1903 at the Conservatory of the Gesellschaft der Musikfreunde (today University of Music and Performing Arts Vienna) with the then principal clarinettist of the Vienna Philharmonic, Franz Bartolomey, who is considered the founder of the Viennese clarinet school. He graduated with distinction in 1907 and studied harmony with Hermann Graedener at the same institution in 1909/10. After a successful audition, Polatschek became the first clarinettist of the Vienna State Opera/Vienna Philharmonic in 1913. His engagement was interrupted by the First World War, as he was drafted into the Austro-Hungarian Armed Forces. After the war, Polatschek was given a temporary teaching assignment at the Academy of Music, which had been renamed "Akademie" in the meantime, and on 1 September 1921 he was officially appointed professor of clarinet there. Among his most important students were Rudolf Jettel, Leopold Wlach and Alfred Boskovsky. In the same year he married Friederike Löffler. Polatschek also taught at the Mödling Realgymnasium, where Friedrich Wildgans became his pupil. In 1924 he took part in the premiere of Anton Webern's Six Songs after Poems by Georg Trakl with his student Leopold Wlach, the latter on the bass clarinet.

=== Boston ===
At the request of the conductor Sergei Koussevitzky, Polatschek accepted the solo clarinet position with the Boston Symphony Orchestra in 1930 and for this engagement, presumably after passing the probationary period, resigned from his position with the Vienna Philharmonic in 1932 as well as his professorship at the Academy of Music and Performing Arts Vienna. He was to remain with this orchestra until his death in 1948. After Austria was largely destroyed by World War II, he helped members of his family to emigrate to the United States. Polatschek taught clarinet both at the Berkshire Music Centre, where he counted David Glazer among his students, and at the Tanglewood Summer Festival. The former professor of clarinet at Indiana University, Henry Gulick, met the Austrian as a student at the Tanglewood Festival and said of him:

I knew him for two six-week sessions of Tanglewood, 1942 and 1946. He did not play the Boehm system as I recall, and used a reed I had never heard of. He had a small, straight sound and tended to get covered up in the orchestra. He did not like vibrato or too much rubato. An impeccable musician... had great taste. Not a happy man – rarely smiled. But being Viennese Jewish in a French Orchestra? Very courtly and refined personality.

On 27 July 1948, the clarinettist died of a heart condition aged 59 in Lenox, Massachusetts, just hours before he was to take part in a series of Bach-Mozart concerts at the Tanglewood Festival.

== Work ==
Polatschek wrote three instructional works for clarinet that are still in use today. These are the 24 Clarinet Studies for beginners, the 12 Etudes for Clarinet and the Advanced Studies for the Clarinet.

== Recordings ==
Although Polatschek was a leading clarinettist of his time and also appeared as a soloist with the Boston Symphony Orchestra, there are no solo recordings of him. The only chamber music recording he participated in was Stravinsky's Histoire du soldat, which was recorded under the direction of Leonard Bernstein at Tanglewood in the summer of 1947. His tenure as an orchestral musician with the Boston Symphony Orchestra resulted in several recordings featuring Polatschek on first clarinet, such as Tchaikovsky's 5th. Symphony in E minor, Debussy's Prélude à l'après-midi d'un faune (both in 1944) and Richard Strauss' Don Juan (1946), all conducted by principal conductor Koussevitzky.
