= Friedrich Wildgans =

Austrian composer and clarinetist

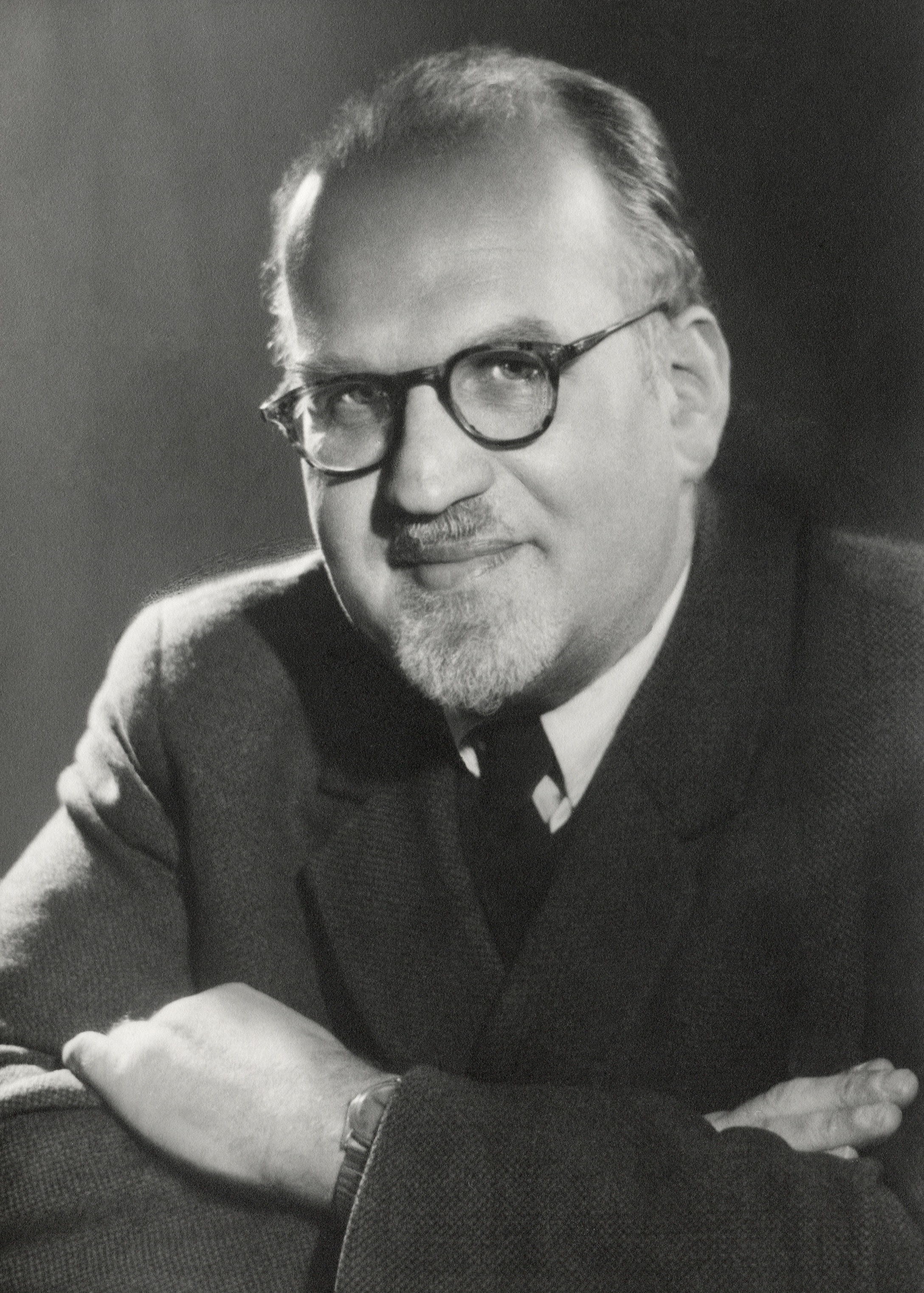
Friedrich Wildgans 1946

Friedrich Wildgans (5 June 1913 in Vienna – 7 November 1965 in Mödling) was an Austrian composer and clarinettist.

== Life ==
Wildgans was born into the family of the well-known poet and Burgtheater director Anton Wildgans (1881-1932) and his wife Lilly, née Würzl. In 1915, the family moved to Mödling. He first learned violin from Gottfried Feist and piano from Paul Weingarten, later learning the clarinet from Viktor Polatschek, which was to become his main instrument. From the age of twelve he received lessons in music theory and composition with Joseph Marx. From 1934 to 1935 he was in Salzburg Teacher at the Mozarteum. From 1936 to 1940, he worked as principal clarinettist in the stage orchestra of the Vienna State Theatres.

Wildgans supported the conservative resistance group Austrian Freedom Movement around Roman Karl Scholz, was therefore arrested by the Gestapo on 25 October 1940 and remained in pre-trial detention until 24 February 1942. On 7 December 1943, he was sentenced by the People's Court to 15 months imprisonment, which was credited to him as served. After his release from prison, he found no professional employment in the public service until the end of the war and temporarily sought his livelihood as an assistant accountant.

After the liberation of Vienna in April 1945, he worked as a teacher at the Austrian Academy of Music, which he had to leave again at the beginning of the 1946/47 academic year. It was not until 1955 that he received a permanent position there again. From 1946 to 1950 Wildgans, who had been a member of the KPÖ since April 1945 (until his resignation or expulsion in July 1950), worked as a music officer in the Cultural Office of the City of Vienna under Viktor Matejka. Since its re-establishment in April 1945 he was executive vice-president and from 1948 to 1961 president of the Austrian Section of the International Society for New Music. He was music critic of the Österreichische Zeitung (1945-1948) published by the Soviet occupation forces and of the intellectual journal Österreichisches Tagebuch (1946-1948) published by the KPÖ and wrote numerous contributions for the Österreichische Musikzeitschrift. He also wrote a book on Anton Webern, which only appeared posthumously. From 21 September to 4 October 1953, Wildgans acted as a juror at the Concours international d'execution musicale Geneve. He was unable to perform as a performer after 1954 due to illness. From 1955, he taught again at the University of Music and Performing Arts Vienna, received the title of professor in 1957 and was last active there as librarian.

Wildgans died at the age of 52. He was married to soprano Ilona Steingruber.

Wildgans' works bear the influence of Paul Hindemith, Igor Stravinsky and the Groupe Les Six. He composed a musical work for clarinet, two concerti and chamber music works as well as a concerto for trumpet, string orchestra and percussion (op. 29, 1935), a sonata for piano (1929) and art songs. The premiere of his Eucharistic Hymns at the Vienna Konzerthaus on 14 June 1954 provoked one of the last great Austrian concert scandals, triggered by the outrage over this "popular cantata", which some found inappropriate, combining sacred texts with syncopated rhythms.

== Work ==
- Symphonic works and chamber music
- Clarinet concertos, piano works
- Choral works and motets
- Missa minima for soprano, clarinet, violin and violoncello, 1932/1954
- The Dictator', operetta (lost), 1933
- The Tree of Knowledge, opera after Franz Theodor Csokor (unfinished), 1935
- The Mystic Trumpeter, cantata for high voice, trumpet and piano after Walt Whitman, 1946
- Film and stage music
- The development of music in Austria in the 20th century, technical paper, 1950
- Anton Webern, A Study, Tübingen: Rainer Wunderlich Publishers 1967
- Publication of four Beethoven works (3 duos clarinet/bassoon, trio oboes/English horn) in Doblinger's series Diletto Musicale.
