= Glück, das mir verblieb =

Aria from the opera Die tote Stadt by Erich Wolfgang Korngold

"Glück, das mir verblieb" (German for "Happiness that remained") is a duet from the 1920 opera Die tote Stadt (The Dead City) composed by Erich Wolfgang Korngold to a libretto by his father Julius Korngold. It is written for soprano and tenor. Also called "Marietta's Lied" or the "Lute Song", it appears in act 1, scene 5. In performances as a concert aria, the soprano will sing both parts.

== Context ==
The "dead city" in the opera's title is Bruges, Belgium, identified in the opera with Marie, the dead wife of Paul. At the start of act 1, Paul confides in a friend the extraordinary news that he has seen Marie, or her double, in the town and that he has invited her to the house. She arrives, and Paul addresses her as Marie, but she corrects him: she is Marietta, a dancer from Lille. He is enchanted by her, especially when she accepts his request for a song, "Glück, das mir verblieb". The words tell of the joy of love, but there is a sadness in it also because its theme is the transitoriness of life. Their voices combine in the verse which extols the power of love to remain constant in a fleeting world.

== Lyrics ==
Glück, das mir verblieb,
rück zu mir, mein treues Lieb.
Abend sinkt im Ha(a)g—
bist mir Licht und Tag.
Bange pochet Herz an Herz—
Hoffnung schwingt sich himmelwärts.

Wie wahr, ein traurig Lied.
Das Lied vom treuen Lieb,
das sterben muss.

Ich kenne das Lied.
Ich hört es oft in jungen,
in schöneren Tagen....
Es hat noch eine Strophe—
weiß ich sie noch?

Naht auch Sorge trüb,
rück zu mir, mein treues Lieb.
Neig dein blass Gesicht—
Sterben trennt uns nicht.
Mußt du einmal von mir gehn,
glaub, es gibt ein Auferstehn.

[You my] happiness that remained,
turn to me, my true love.
Evening is setting in the grove—
you are light and day to me.
Anxiously heart beats against heart—
hope soars heavenward.

How true, a sad song.
The song of the faithful lover
who must die.

I know the song.
I heard it often in younger,
in better days....
It has another verse—
do I still know it?

Though grim sorrow may approach,
turn to me, my true love.
Incline your pale face—
death will not separate us.
If you must leave me one day,
trust there is a resurrection.

== In films ==
- 1974: La Paloma, directed by Daniel Schmid (recording: Lotte Lehmann and Richard Tauber, uncredited)
- 1986: Aria, segment directed by Bruce Beresford (recording: Carol Neblett and René Kollo)
- 1989: Slaves of New York, directed by James Ivory (recording: Neblett and Kollo)
- 1998: The Big Lebowski, directed by Coen brothers; from a 1949 recording conducted by Korngold himself and performed by Ilona Steingruber, Anton Dermota and the ORF Symphony Orchestra
- 2012: A Late Quartet, directed Yaron Zilberman, performed by Anne Sofie von Otter
