= The Big Lebowski =

1998 film by Joel and Ethan Coen

- Theatrical release poster
- Directed by: Joel Coen (Note: Although the Coen brothers co-directed this film, Joel received sole credit due to Directors Guild of America regulations)
- Written by: Ethan Coen; Joel Coen
- Produced by: Ethan Coen (Note: Although the Coen brothers both produced this film, Ethan received sole credit due to Directors Guild of America regulations)
- Starring: Jeff Bridges; John Goodman; Julianne Moore; Steve Buscemi; John Turturro
- Cinematography: Roger Deakins
- Edited by: Roderick Jaynes (Note: Roderick Jaynes is the shared pseudonym used by the Coen brothers for their editing.); Tricia Cooke
- Music by: Carter Burwell
- Production company: Working Title Films
- Distributed by: Gramercy Pictures (U.S. & Canada); PolyGram Filmed Entertainment (International)
- Release dates: January 18, 1998 (Sundance); March 6, 1998 (U.S.); April 24, 1998 (U.K.)
- Running time: 117 minutes
- Countries: United States; United Kingdom
- Language: English
- Budget: $15 million
- Box office: $48.3 million

The Big Lebowski (/ləˈbaʊski/) is a 1998 crime comedy film written, directed, produced and co-edited by Joel and Ethan Coen, and starring Jeff Bridges, John Goodman, Julianne Moore, Steve Buscemi, and John Turturro. It follows the life of Jeffrey "The Dude" Lebowski, a Los Angeles slacker and avid bowler who is assaulted as a result of mistaken identity and becomes embroiled in a kidnapping and ransom scheme focused on a millionaire who shares his name.

The neo-noir film is loosely inspired by the work of Raymond Chandler. Joel Coen said, "We wanted to do a Chandler kind of story—how it moves episodically and deals with the characters trying to unravel a mystery, as well as having a hopelessly complex plot that's ultimately unimportant." The score is by Carter Burwell, a longtime collaborator of the Coen brothers.

The Big Lebowski was produced by Working Title Films and distributed by Gramercy Pictures in the United States and Canada and by PolyGram Filmed Entertainment internationally. It received mixed reviews at the time of its release. Reviews have since become largely positive and the film, noted for its eccentric characters, comedic dream sequences, idiosyncratic dialogue, and eclectic soundtrack, has garnered a cult following. In 2014, the film was selected for preservation in the United States National Film Registry by the Library of Congress as "culturally, historically or aesthetically significant."

== Plot ==
In 1991, slacker and bowler Jeffrey "The Dude" Lebowski, is attacked in his Los Angeles home by two enforcers for porn kingpin Jackie Treehorn, to whom a different Jeffrey Lebowski's wife owes money. One enforcer urinates on The Dude's rug before they realize they have the wrong man, and leave.

After consulting his bowling partners, Walter Sobchak, a Vietnam veteran with PTSD, and mild mannered, easily distracted Donny Kerabatsos, The Dude visits philanthropist Jeffrey Lebowski, who is paralyzed from the waist down and uses a wheelchair, requesting compensation for the rug. Lebowski refuses, but The Dude tricks his assistant Brandt into letting him take a similar rug from the mansion. Outside, he meets Lebowski's young trophy wife, Bunny, and her German nihilist friend, Uli. Soon afterward, Bunny is apparently kidnapped, and Lebowski hires The Dude to deliver a ransom. That night, another group of thugs ambushes The Dude, taking his replacement rug on behalf of Lebowski's daughter, Maude.

Convinced the kidnap was a ruse by Bunny, Walter fakes the ransom drop. He and The Dude go bowling, leaving the ransom briefcase in the car. While they are bowling, the car is stolen. The Dude is confronted by Lebowski, who has an envelope from the kidnappers containing a severed toe, supposedly Bunny's. Maude asks The Dude to help recover the money her father illegally withdrew from the family's charity foundation.

The police recover The Dude's car. The briefcase is missing, but The Dude finds a sheet of homework, signed by a teenager named Larry Sellers. Walter learns that Larry is the son of Arthur Digby Sellers, a writer for the television show Branded, which Walter reveres. The Dude, Walter, and Donny visit Larry but get no information from him. An enraged Walter destroys a Corvette he thinks is Larry's with a crowbar, only to find out it belongs to a neighbor, who vandalizes The Dude's car in retaliation.

Treehorn's thugs abduct The Dude and bring him to Jackie Treehorn's Malibu beach estate. He demands to know where Bunny is. The Dude says Bunny faked her kidnapping and Larry has the money, then passes out from a spiked drink Treehorn gave him. He is briefly arrested while wandering intoxicated in Malibu. On his way home, Bunny, all of her toes intact, drives by, unnoticed by The Dude.

Maude is waiting for The Dude at his home and has sex with him, wishing to become pregnant. She tells The Dude that her father has no money of his own; he is dependent on an allowance that Maude gives him out of her inheritance from her late mother.

The Dude and Walter confront Lebowski and find that Bunny has returned, having simply gone out of town. Bunny's nihilist friends took the opportunity to blackmail her husband, who in turn had tried to embezzle money from the family charity, blaming its disappearance on the blackmailers. The Dude believes the briefcase never contained any money. Angered by these revelations, Walter suspects that Lebowski is faking his paralysis and lifts him out of his wheelchair to prove it, but quickly discovers that his condition is real.

Walter and The Dude are bowling when a rival bowler, Jesus Quintana, interrupts them. Walter had previously stated that he could not bowl on Saturdays since he is shomer Shabbos. Quintana expresses scorn and storms out. Outside the bowling alley, the nihilists set fire to The Dude's car and demand the ransom money. Walter fights them off, but Donny dies from a heart attack in the commotion. On a cliff overlooking the Pacific Ocean, Walter eulogizes Donny's death but ruins the moment by referring to his fallen comrades in Vietnam. As he scatters Donny's ashes, they are blown back onto The Dude by an updraft. As Walter tries to brush off the ashes, The Dude loses his temper and yells at him for everything that has happened. After Walter apologizes and consoles The Dude, the two go bowling.

The bowling team does ok, rolling their way into the semis. There is a scheduling mixup, where a match was scheduled on a Saturday when Walter couldn't play, but eventually after a call to tournament official, Burkhalter, the team eventually is matched against Quintana.

At the bowling alley, The Dude encounters the Stranger, the movie's narrator. Addressing the audience, he compliments The Dude, and reveals that a "little Lebowski" is on the way.

== Cast ==
- Jeff Bridges as Jeffrey "The Dude" Lebowski
- John Goodman as Walter Sobchak
- Julianne Moore as Maude Lebowski
- Steve Buscemi as Donny Kerabatsos
- David Huddleston as Jeffrey Lebowski, the eponymous "Big Lebowski"
- Philip Seymour Hoffman as Brandt
- Tara Reid as Bunny Lebowski
- John Turturro as Jesus Quintana
- Sam Elliott as The Stranger
- David Thewlis as Knox Harrington
- Ben Gazzara as Jackie Treehorn
- Peter Stormare as Uli Kunkel/"Karl Hungus", the leader of the nihilists
- Flea as Kieffer, a nihilist
- Torsten Voges as Franz, a nihilist
- Jon Polito as Da Fino
- Philip Moon and Mark Pellegrino as Treehorn's thugs
- Jimmie Dale Gilmore as Smokey
- Jack Kehler as Marty, the Dude's landlord
- Dom Irrera as Tony, the chauffeur
- Harry Bugin as Arthur Digby Sellers
- Jesse Flanagan as Larry Sellers
- Leon Russom as the Malibu Police Chief
- Warren Keith as Francis Donnelly, funeral director
- Marshall Manesh as Doctor
- Aimee Mann as Franz's girlfriend
- Ajgie Kirkland as Cab driver
- Richard Gant and Christian Clemenson as cops
- Asia Carrera as Sherry, porn actress (uncredited)

Credits from the British Film Institute collections.

== Production ==
=== Development ===
The Dude is mostly inspired by Jeff Dowd, an American film producer and political activist the Coen brothers met while they were trying to find distribution for their first feature, Blood Simple. Dowd had been a member of the Seattle Seven, liked to drink white Russians, and was known as "The Dude". The Dude was also partly based on a friend of the Coen brothers, Peter Exline (now a member of the faculty at USC's School of Cinematic Arts), a Vietnam War veteran who reportedly lived in a dump of an apartment and was proud of a little rug that "tied the room together". Exline knew Barry Sonnenfeld from New York University and Sonnenfeld introduced Exline to the Coen brothers while they were trying to raise money for Blood Simple. Exline became friends with the Coens and in 1989, told them many stories from his own life, including some about his actor-writer friend Lewis Abernathy (one of the inspirations for Walter), a fellow Vietnam vet who later became a private investigator and helped him track down and confront a high school kid who stole his car. As in the film, Exline's car was impounded by the Los Angeles Police Department and Abernathy found an 8th grader's homework under the passenger seat.

Exline also belonged to an amateur softball league but the Coens changed it to bowling in the film, because "it's a very social sport where you can sit around and drink and smoke while engaging in inane conversation". The Coens met filmmaker John Milius when they were in Los Angeles making Barton Fink and incorporated his love of guns and the military into the character of Walter. Milius introduced the Coen Brothers to one of his best friends, Jim Ganzer, who also served as a source for creating Jeff Bridges' character. Also known as The Dude, Ganzer and his gang, typical Malibu surfers, also served as inspiration for Milius's film Big Wednesday.

The role of Jeffrey Lebowski proved one of the most difficult roles to cast. The Coens contacted Robert Duvall (who did not like the script), Anthony Hopkins (who was not interested in playing an American), Gene Hackman (who was taking a break from acting), and Jack Nicholson. They then floated a long list of experienced actors as well as non-actor public figures such as Jerry Falwell and Norman Schwarzkopf, with Marlon Brando as their ideal, before deciding on David Huddleston within a month of filming. Charlize Theron was considered for the role of Bunny Lebowski. David Cross auditioned for the role of Brandt.

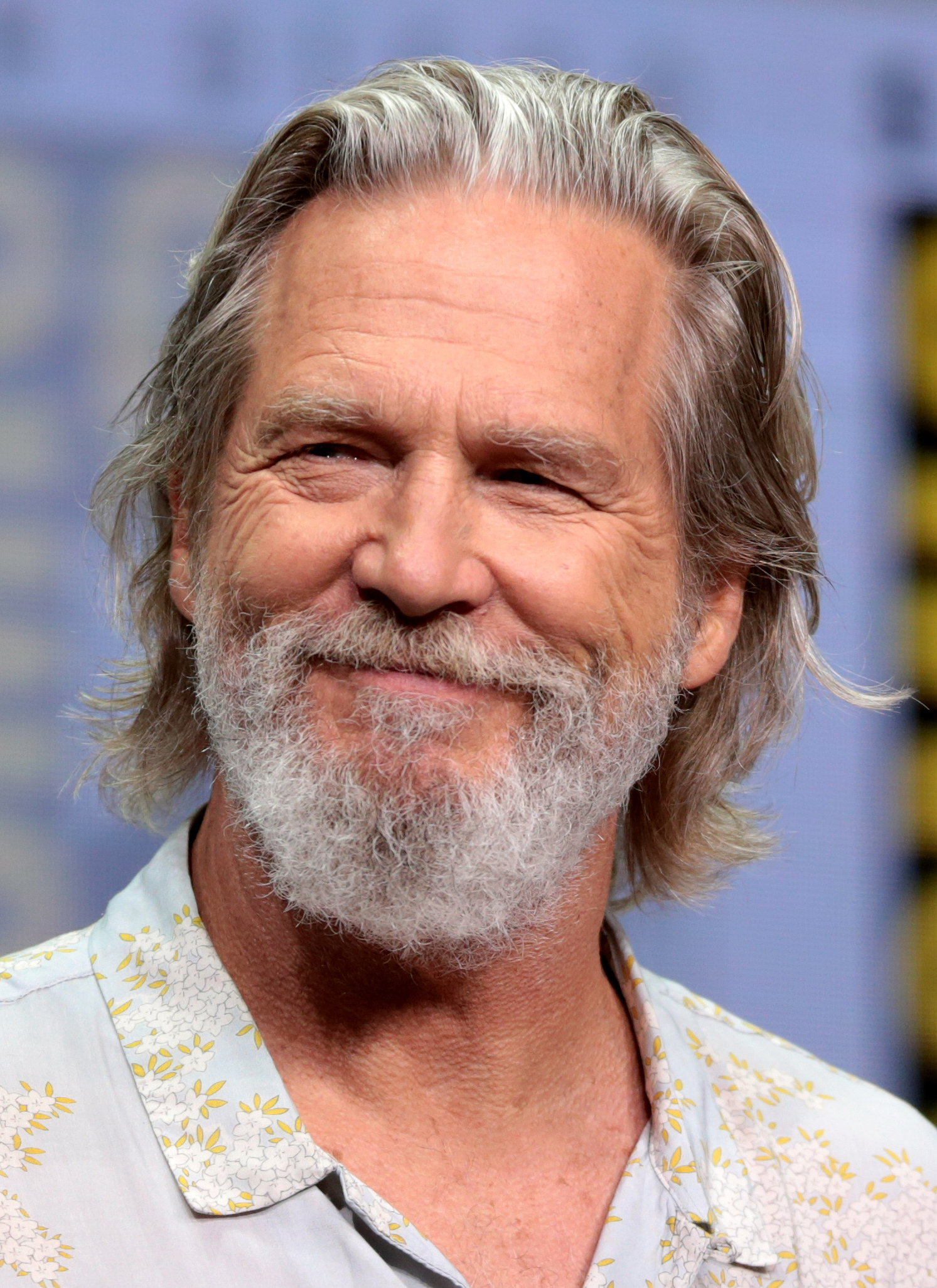
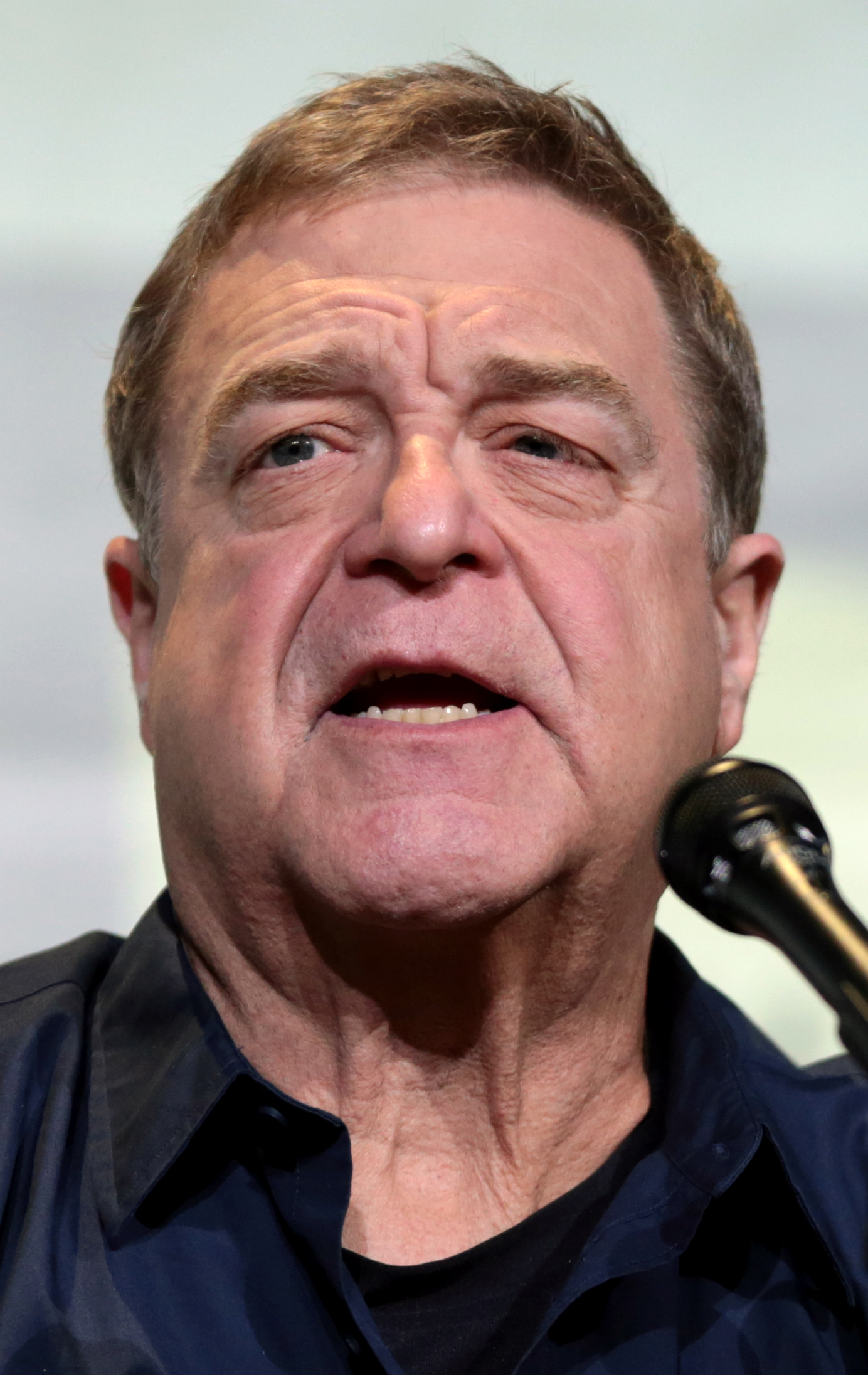
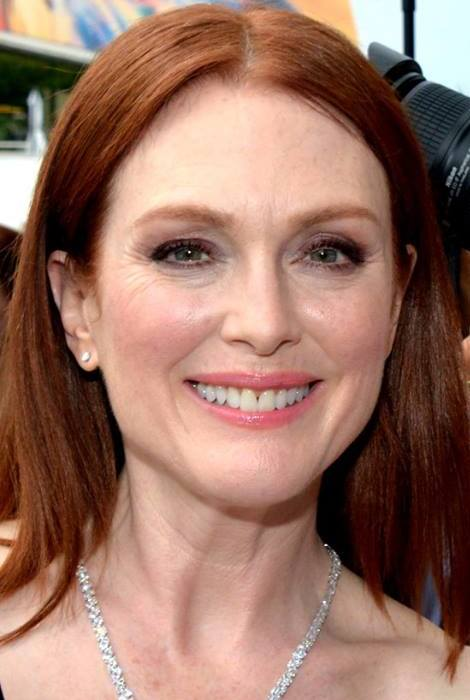
Left to right: Jeff Bridges (pictured in 2017), John Goodman (2016) and Julianne Moore (2018)

According to Julianne Moore, the character of Maude was based on artist Carolee Schneemann, "who worked naked from a swing", and on Yoko Ono.

The character of Jesus, a bowling opponent of The Dude's team, was inspired in part by a performance the Coens had seen John Turturro give in 1988 at the Public Theater in a play called Mi Puta Vida in which he played a pederast-type character, "so we thought, let's make Turturro a pederast. It'll be something he can really run with," Joel said in an interview.

The film's overall structure was influenced by the detective fiction of Raymond Chandler. Ethan said, "We wanted something that would generate a certain narrative feeling – like a modern Raymond Chandler story, and that's why it had to be set in Los Angeles ... We wanted to have a narrative flow, a story that moves like a Chandler book through different parts of town and different social classes." The use of the Stranger's voice-over also came from Chandler as Joel remarked, "He is a little bit of an audience substitute. In the movie adaptation of Chandler it's the main character that speaks off-screen, but we didn't want to reproduce that though it obviously has echoes. It's as if someone was commenting on the plot from an all-seeing point of view. And at the same time rediscovering the old earthiness of a Mark Twain."

The significance of the bowling culture was, according to Joel, "important in reflecting that period at the end of the fifties and the beginning of the sixties. That suited the retro side of the movie, slightly anachronistic, which sent us back to a not-so-far-away era, but one that was well and truly gone nevertheless."

=== Screenplay ===
The Coen Brothers wrote The Big Lebowski around the same time as Barton Fink. When the Coen brothers wanted to make it, John Goodman was filming episodes for Roseanne and Jeff Bridges was making the Walter Hill film Wild Bill. The Coens decided to make Fargo in the meantime. According to Ethan, "the movie was conceived as pivoting around that relationship between The Dude and Walter", which sprang from the scenes between Barton Fink and Charlie Meadows in Barton Fink. They also came up with the idea of setting the film in contemporary L.A., because the people who inspired the story lived in the area. When Pete Exline told them about the homework in a baggie incident, the Coens thought that that was very Raymond Chandler and decided to integrate elements of the author's fiction into their script. Joel Coen cites Robert Altman's The Long Goodbye as a primary influence on their film, in the sense that The Big Lebowski "is just kind of informed by Chandler around the edges". When they started writing the script, the Coens wrote only 40 pages and then let it sit for a while before finishing it. This is a normal writing process for them, because they often "encounter a problem at a certain stage, we pass to another project, then we come back to the first script. That way we've already accumulated pieces for several future movies." In order to liven up a scene that they thought was too heavy on exposition, they added an "effete art-world hanger-on", known as Knox Harrington, late in the screenwriting process. In the original script, The Dude's car was a Chrysler LeBaron, as Dowd had once owned, but that car was not big enough to fit John Goodman so the Coens changed it to a Ford Torino.

=== Pre-production ===
PolyGram and Working Title Films, which had funded Fargo, backed The Big Lebowski with a budget of $15 million. In casting the film, Joel remarked, "we tend to write both for people we know and have worked with, and some parts without knowing who's going to play the role. In The Big Lebowski we did write for John and Steve, but we didn't know who was getting the Jeff Bridges role." The Coens originally considered Mel Gibson for the role of The Dude, but he did not take the pitch too seriously. Bridges was hesitant to play the role as he was worried it would be a bad example for his daughters, but his daughter Jessica convinced him to take it after a meeting. In preparation for his role, Bridges met Dowd but actually "drew on myself a lot from back in the Sixties and Seventies. I lived in a little place like that and did drugs, although I think I was a little more creative than The Dude." Bridges went into his own closet with the film's wardrobe person and picked out clothes he thought The Dude might wear. He wore his character's clothes home because most of them were his own. He also mimicked Dowd's physical form, including the slouching and ample belly. Originally, Goodman wanted a different kind of beard for Walter but the Coen brothers insisted on the "Gladiator" or what they called the "Chin Strap" and he thought it would go well with his flattop haircut.

For the film's look, the Coens wanted to avoid the usual retro 1960s clichés like lava lamps, Day-Glo posters, and Grateful Dead music and for it to be "consistent with the whole bowling thing, we wanted to keep the movie pretty bright and poppy", Joel said in an interview. For example, the star motif, featured predominantly throughout the film, started with the film's production designer Richard Heinrichs's design for the bowling alley. According to Joel, he "came up with the idea of just laying free-form neon stars on top of it and doing a similar free-form star thing on the interior". This carried over to the film's dream sequences. "Both dream sequences involve star patterns and are about lines radiating to a point. In the first dream sequence, The Dude gets knocked out and you see stars and they all coalesce into the overhead nightscape of L.A. The second dream sequence is an astral environment with a backdrop of stars", remembers Heinrichs. For Jackie Treehorn's Malibu beach house, he was inspired by late 1950s and early 1960s bachelor pad furniture. The Coen brothers told Heinrichs that they wanted Treehorn's beach party to be Inca-themed, with a "very Hollywood-looking party in which young, oiled-down, fairly aggressive men walk around with appetizers and drinks. So there's a very sacrificial quality to it."

Cinematographer Roger Deakins discussed the film's look with the Coens during pre-production. They told him they wanted some parts of it to have a real and contemporary feeling and other parts, like the dream sequences, to be very stylized look. Bill and Jacqui Landrum did all the choreography. For his dance sequence, Jack Kehler went through three three-hour rehearsals. The Coens offered him three or four choices of classical music to pick from and he chose Modest Mussorgsky's Pictures at an Exhibition. At each rehearsal, he went through each phase of the piece.

=== Principal photography ===
Filming took 11 weeks in January to April 1997, with location shooting in and around Los Angeles, including all the bowling sequences at the Hollywood Star Lanes (for three weeks) and The Dude's Busby Berkeley dream sequences in a converted airplane hangar. According to Joel, the only time they ever directed Bridges "was when he would come over at the beginning of each scene and ask, 'Do you think The Dude burned one on the way over?' I'd reply 'Yes' usually, so Jeff would go over in the corner and start rubbing his eyes to get them bloodshot." Julianne Moore was sent the script while working on The Lost World: Jurassic Park. She worked only two weeks on the film, early and late during the production, while Sam Elliott was on set for two days and did many takes of his final speech. During the latter stages of shooting, Moore became pregnant with her son, who was born in December.

Joel Coen said that Bridges was upset there was no playback monitor and made them get one at the end of the second week of production.

The scenes in Jackie Treehorn's house were shot in the Sheats-Goldstein Residence, designed by John Lautner and built in 1963 in the Hollywood Hills.

Deakins described the look of the fantasy scenes as crisp, monochromatic, and highly lit in order to afford greater depth of focus. Of The Dude's apartment, Deakins said, "it's kind of seedy and the light's pretty nasty" with a grittier look. The visual bridge between these two looks was how he photographed the night scenes. Instead of adopting the usual blue moonlight or blue streetlamp look, he used an orange sodium-light effect. The Coens shot much of the film with wide-angle lens because, according to Joel, it made it easier to hold focus for a greater depth and it made camera movements more dynamic.

To achieve the point-of-view of a rolling bowling ball the Coen brothers mounted a camera "on something like a barbecue spit", according to Ethan, and then dollied it along the lane. The challenge was figuring out the relative speeds of the forward motion and the rotating motion. CGI was used to create the vantage point of the thumb hole in the bowling ball.

=== Soundtrack ===
The score is by Carter Burwell, a veteran of all the Coens' films. The Big Lebowski (Original Motion Picture Soundtrack) was released on Mercury Records on February 24, 1998, and was jointly produced by the Coens and the film's music supervisor, T Bone Burnett.

== Reception ==
=== Box office ===
The Big Lebowski premiered at the Sundance Film Festival on January 18, 1998, at the 1,300-capacity Eccles Theater. It also screened at the 48th Berlin International Film Festival before opening in the United States and Canada on March 6, 1998, in 1,207 theaters. It grossed $5.5 million on its opening weekend, finishing with a gross of $19.5 million in the US and Canada. It grossed $28.8 million outside the US and Canada (including $2.6 million in the United Kingdom), bringing its worldwide gross to $48.3 million.

=== Critical response ===
On review aggregator Rotten Tomatoes, the film holds an approval rating of 80% based on 191 reviews, with an average score of 7.40/10. The website's critics consensus reads, "The Big Lebowski's shaggy dog story won't satisfy everybody, but those who abide will be treated to a rambling succession of comic delights, with Jeff Bridges' laconic performance really tying the movie together." Metacritic, which uses a weighted average, has assigned the film a score of 71 out of 100 based on reviews from 46 critics, indicating "generally favorable reviews". Audiences polled by CinemaScore gave the film an average grade of B on an A+ to F scale.

Many critics and audiences have likened the film to a modern Western. Others dispute this, or liken it to a crime novel that revolves around mistaken identity plot devices. Peter Howell, in his review for the Toronto Star, wrote, "It's hard to believe that this is the work of a team that won an Oscar last year for the original screenplay of Fargo. There's a large amount of profanity in the movie, which seems a weak attempt to paper over dialogue gaps." Howell revised his opinion in a later review, writing in 2011, "it may just be my favourite Coen Bros. film."

Todd McCarthy wrote in Variety magazine, "One of the film's indisputable triumphs is its soundtrack, which mixes Carter Burwell's original score with classic pop tunes and some fabulous covers." USA Today gave the film three out of four stars and wrote that The Dude was "too passive a hero to sustain interest" but that there was "enough startling brilliance here to suggest that, just like The Dude, those smarty-pants Coens will abide."

In his review for The Washington Post, Desson Howe praised the Coens and "their inspired, absurdist taste for weird, peculiar Americana—but a sort of neo-Americana that is entirely invented—the Coens have defined and mastered their own bizarre subgenre. No one does it like them and, it almost goes without saying, no one does it better."

Janet Maslin praised Bridges's performance in her review for The New York Times: "Mr. Bridges finds a role so right for him that he seems never to have been anywhere else. Watch this performance to see shambling executed with nonchalant grace and a seemingly out-to-lunch character played with fine comic flair." Andrew Sarris, in his review for the New York Observer, wrote, "The result is a lot of laughs and a feeling of awe toward the craftsmanship involved. I doubt that there'll be anything else like it the rest of this year." In a five-star review for Empire, Ian Nathan wrote, "For those who delight in the Coens' divinely abstract take on reality, this is pure nirvana" and "in a perfect world all movies would be made by the Coen brothers." Roger Ebert of the Chicago Sun-Times gave the film three stars out of four, saying The Big Lebowski was inferior to Fargo but nonetheless "a genial, shambling comedy" that was "weirdly engaging". In a 2010 review, Ebert raised his original score to four stars and added the film to his "Great Movies" canon. He called its plot almost irrelevant and the film a triumph of visual style and eccentric character performances anchored by Bridges's role: "The Dude is in a sense Philip Marlowe—not in his energy or focus, but in the code he lives by."

Jonathan Rosenbaum wrote in the Chicago Reader, "To be sure, The Big Lebowski is packed with show-offy filmmaking and as a result is pretty entertaining. But insofar as it represents a moral position—and the Coens' relative styling of their figures invariably does—it's an elitist one, elevating salt-of-the-earth types like Bridges and Goodman [...] over everyone else in the movie." Dave Kehr, in his review for the Daily News, called the film's premise a "tired idea, and it produces an episodic, unstrung film." The Guardian called the film "a bunch of ideas shoveled into a bag and allowed to spill out at random. The film is infuriating, and will win no prizes. But it does have some terrific jokes."

== Legacy ==
Since its original release, The Big Lebowski has become a cult classic. Ardent fans of the film call themselves "achievers". Steve Palopoli wrote about the film's emerging cult status in July 2002. He first realized that the film had a cult following when he attended a midnight screening in 2000 at the New Beverly Cinema in Los Angeles and witnessed people quoting dialogue from the film to each other. Soon after the article appeared, the programmer for a local midnight film series in Santa Cruz decided to screen The Big Lebowski and on the first weekend they had to turn away several hundred people. The theater held the film over for six weeks, which had never happened before.

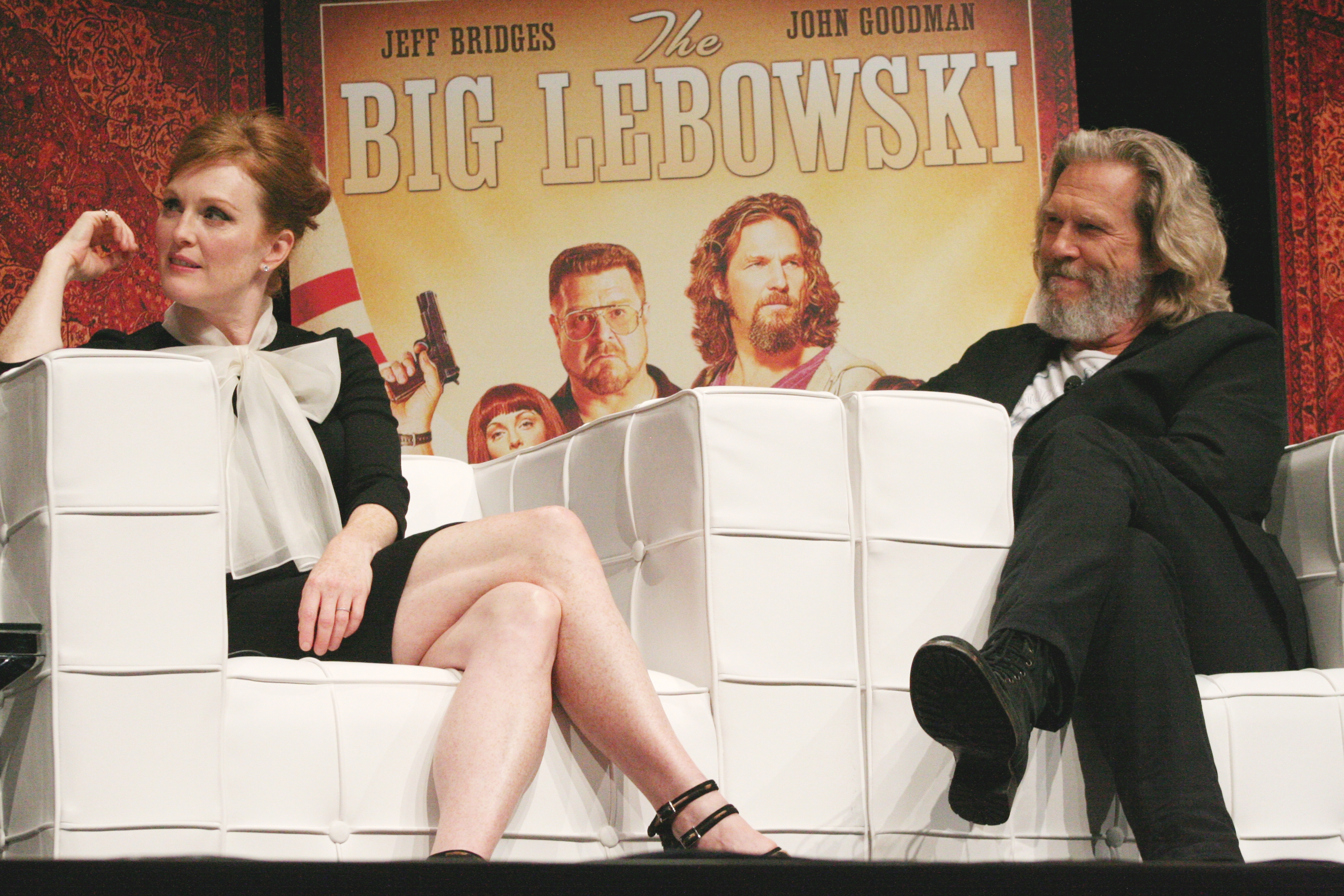
Stars Julianne Moore and Jeff Bridges at the 2011 Lebowski Fest

An annual festival, Lebowski Fest, began in Louisville, Kentucky, United States, in 2002 with 150 fans showing up, and has since expanded to several other cities. The festival's main event each year is a night of unlimited bowling with various contests including costume, trivia, hardest- and farthest-traveled contests. Held over a weekend, events typically include a pre-fest party with bands the night before the bowling event as well as a day-long outdoor party with bands, vendor booths and games. Various celebrities from the film have attended some of the events, including Jeff Bridges who attended the Los Angeles event. The British equivalent, inspired by Lebowski Fest, is known as The Dude Abides and is held in London.

Dudeism, a religion devoted largely to spreading the philosophy and lifestyle of the film's main character, was founded in 2005. Also known as The Church of the Latter-Day Dude (a name parody of The Church of Jesus Christ of Latter-day Saints), the organization has ordained over 220,000 "Dudeist Priests" all over the world via its website.

"The Big Lebowski and Philosophy: Keeping Your Mind Limber with Abiding Wisdom," published in 2012 by Wiley, is a collection of 18 essays by different writers analyzing the movie's philosophical themes of nihilism, war and politics, money and materialism, idealism and morality, and The Dude as the philosopher's hero who struggles to live the good life in spite of the challenges he endures.

Two species of African spider are named after the film and main character: Anelosimus biglebowski and Anelosimus dude, both described in 2006. Additionally, an extinct Permian conifer genus is named after the film in honor of its creators. The first species described within this genus in 2007 is based on 270-million-year-old plant fossils from Texas, and is called Lebowskia grandifolia.

Entertainment Weekly ranked it 8th on their Funniest Movies of the Past 25 Years list. The film was also ranked No. 34 on their list of "The Top 50 Cult Films" and ranked No. 15 on the magazine's "The Cult 25: The Essential Left-Field Movie Hits Since '83" list. In addition, the magazine also ranked The Dude No. 14 in their "The 100 Greatest Characters of the Last 20 Years" poll. The film was also nominated for the prestigious Grand Prix of the Belgian Film Critics Association. The Big Lebowski was voted as the 10th best film set in Los Angeles in the last 25 years by a group of Los Angeles Times writers and editors with two criteria: "The movie had to communicate some inherent truth about the L.A. experience, and only one film per director was allowed on the list." Empire magazine ranked Walter Sobchak No. 49 and The Dude No. 7 in their "The 100 Greatest Movie Characters" poll. Roger Ebert added The Big Lebowski to his list of "Great Movies" in March 2010.

=== Spin-off ===
The Coen brothers have stated that they will never make a sequel to The Big Lebowski. Nevertheless, John Turturro expressed interest in reprising his role as Jesus Quintana, and in 2014, he announced that he had requested permission to use the character. In August 2016, it was reported that Turturro would reprise his role as Jesus Quintana in The Jesus Rolls, a spin-off of The Big Lebowski, based on the 1974 French film Going Places, with Turturro starring, writing, and directing. It was released in 2020. The Coen brothers, although having granted Turturro the right to use the character, were not involved, and no other character from The Big Lebowski was featured in the film.

=== Stella Artois commercial ===
On January 24, 2019, Jeff Bridges posted a 5-second clip on Twitter with the statement: "Can't be living in the past, man. Stay tuned" and showing Bridges as The Dude, walking through a room as a tumbleweed rolls by. The clip was a teaser trailer for an ad during Super Bowl LIII which featured Bridges reprising the role of The Dude for a Stella Artois commercial.

=== Use as social and political analysis ===
The Big Lebowski has been interpreted from a variety of social and political perspectives by academics and pundits.

In September 2008, Slate published an article that interpreted The Big Lebowski as a political critique. The center piece of this viewpoint was that Walter Sobchak is "a neocon," citing the film's references to then President George H. W. Bush and the first Gulf War. The article says Sobchak's aggressive and impulsive attitude, which always results in catastrophe, is an allegory of neoconservative foreign policy and its supposed consequences.

An article by Brian Wall, published in the feminist journal Camera Obscura, uses the film to explain Karl Marx's commodity fetishism and the feminist consequences of sexual fetishism.

In That Rug Really Tied the Room Together, first published in 2001, Joseph Natoli argues that The Dude represents a counter narrative to the post-Reaganomic entrepreneurial rush for "return on investment" on display in such films as Jerry Maguire and Forrest Gump.

The movie has been interpreted as a carnivalesque critique of society, as an analysis on war and ethics, as a narrative on mass communication, and US militarism and other issues.

== Home media ==
Universal Studios Home Entertainment released a "Collector's Edition" DVD on October 18, 2005, with extra features that included an "introduction by Mortimer Young", "Jeff Bridges' Photography", "Making of The Big Lebowski", and "Production Notes". In addition, a limited-edition "Achiever's Edition Gift Set" also included The Big Lebowski Bowling Shammy Towel, four Collectible Coasters that included photographs and quotable lines from the film, and eight Exclusive Photo Cards from Jeff Bridges' personal collection. A "10th Anniversary Edition" was released on September 9, 2008, and features all of the extras from the "Collector's Edition" and "The Dude's Life: Strikes and Gutters ... Ups and Downs ... The Dude Abides" theatrical trailer (from the first DVD release), "The Lebowski Fest: An Achiever's Story", "Flying Carpets and Bowling Pin Dreams: The Dream Sequences of The Dude", "Interactive Map", "Jeff Bridges Photo Book", and a "Photo Gallery". There are both a standard release and a Limited Edition which features "Bowling Ball Packaging" and is individually numbered.

A high-definition version of The Big Lebowski was released by Universal on HD DVD format on June 26, 2007. The film was released on Blu-ray in Italy by Cecchi Gori Home Video in 2010.

On August 16, 2011, Universal Pictures released The Big Lebowski on Blu-ray. The limited-edition package includes a Jeff Bridges photo book, a ten-years-on retrospective, and an in-depth look at the annual Lebowski Fest. The film is also available in the Blu-ray Coen Brothers box set released in the UK; however, this version is region-free and will work in any Blu-ray player.

For the film's 20th anniversary, Universal Pictures released a Ultra HD Blu-ray version of the film on October 16, 2018.

== See also ==
- Cutter's Way
- List of cult films
- List of films that most frequently use the word fuck
- List of films featuring fictional films
- List of films featuring miniature people
