= Brentano String Quartet =

US string quartet

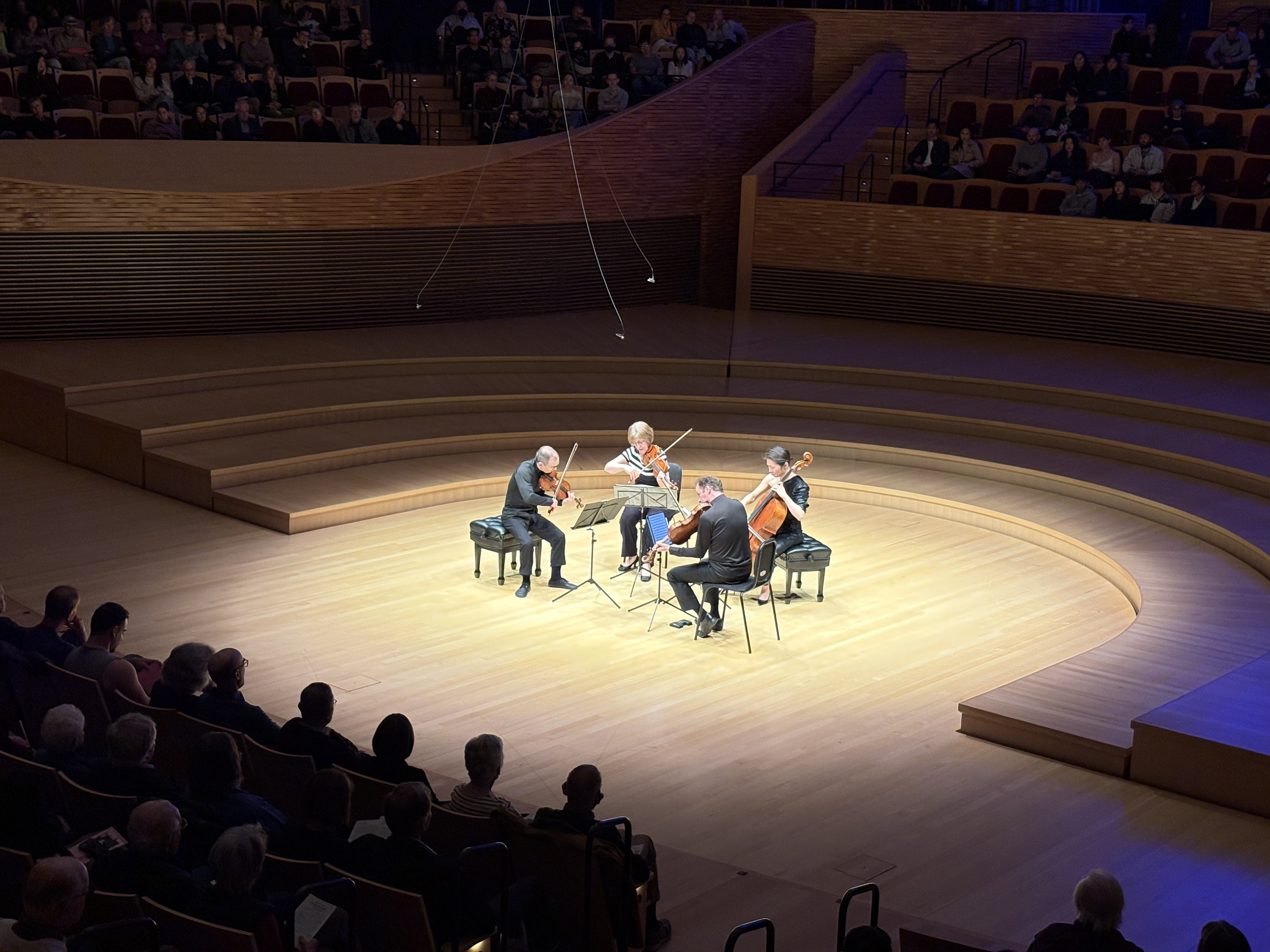
The Brentano Quartet performing at Stanford University

The Brentano Quartet is an American string quartet.

== History ==
Founded in 1992 at the Juilliard School, the quartet's founding members were violinists Mark Steinberg and Serena Canin, violist Misha Amory, and cellist Michael Kannen. At the suggestion of Canin's husband, a pianist, the quartet took its name from Antonie Brentano, who has been proposed as Beethoven's "Immortal Beloved".

The quartet made its public New York City concert debut in February 1994. In 1995, the quartet received the Naumburg Award and the Martin Segal Prize. Kannen left the quartet in May 1998, following his wife's injury in an automobile accident, to care for his young child. Nina Lee then joined the quartet as the ensemble's cellist. The quartet has since worked together with Kannen as guest cellist, such as in concerts in March 2008 at the Pennsylvania State University and in September 2014 at Amherst College. Kannen has also returned as a substitute cellist with the quartet when Lee was pregnant.

In 1999, the quartet became the first ensemble-in-residence at Princeton University, having first performed as guest artists at Princeton in 1993. The quartet appeared for the first time at the Van Cliburn International Piano Competition in 2013 in Fort Worth, Texas, where they performed piano quintets with each of the competition's 12 semifinalists. The quartet held their Princeton residency until 2014. In November 2013, the Brentano Quartet was announced as the new faculty quartet-in-residence at the Yale School of Music, in succession to the Tokyo String Quartet, effective in July 2014.

The Brentano Quartet has commissioned new compositions from such composers as Gabriela Lena Frank, and also have commissioned new works under the umbrellas of 'Art of the Fugue Project' and 'Fragments Project'. The quartet has made commercial recordings for such labels as Naxos. In other media, the quartet was featured on the soundtrack of the 2012 film A Late Quartet. Lee made a cameo appearance in the film as a fictionalised version of herself, as the cellist of a fictitious piano trio led by Wallace Shawn.
