= Franz Baur =

Austrian composer

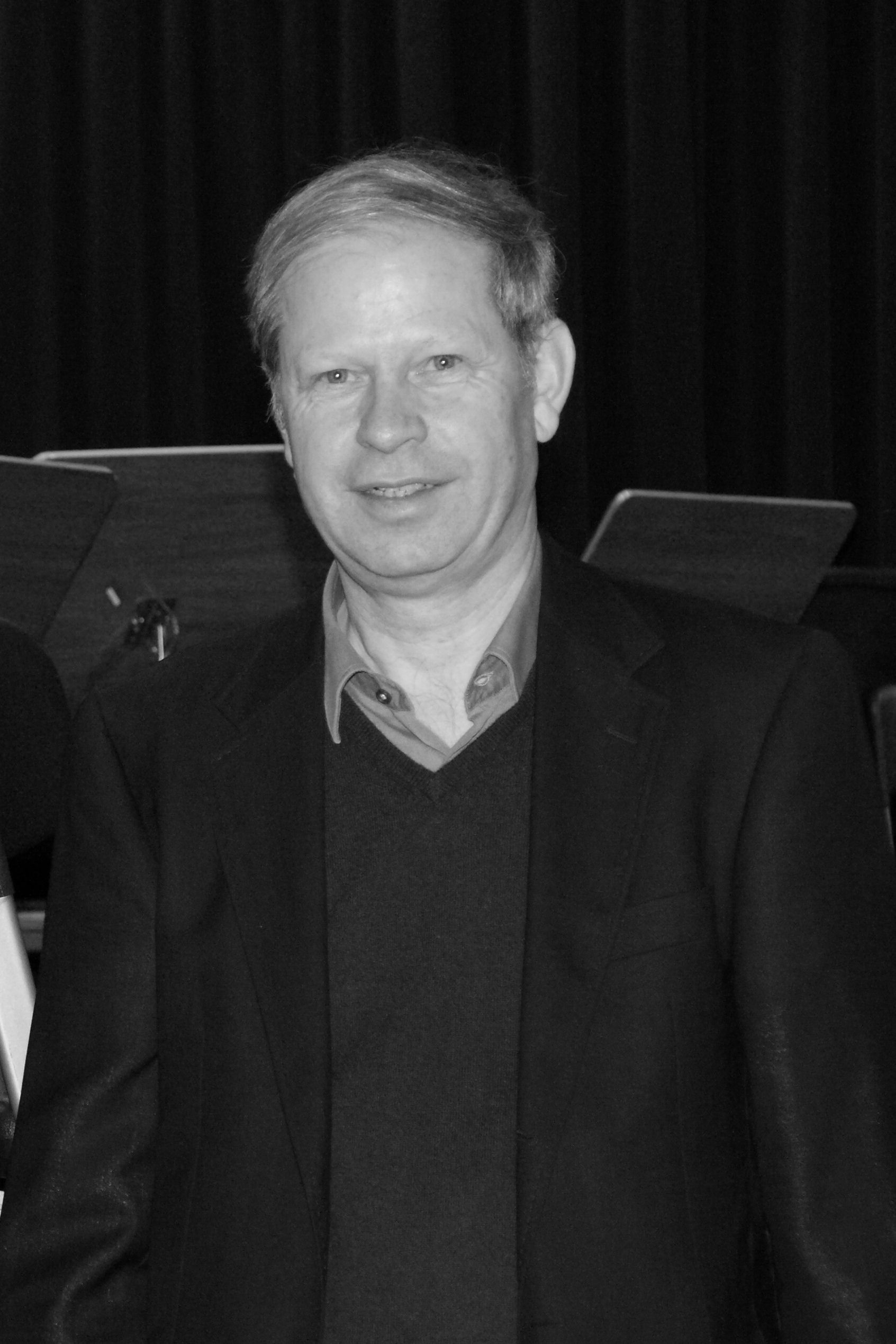
Franz Baur

Franz Baur (born 25 January 1958 in Hall in Tirol) is a Tirolean composer. He was recipient of the Tiroler Landespreis für Kunst in 2011. His compositions have been performed in Austria, Germany, South Tirol, the USA and Ukraine. His work includes more than 50 compositions from large orchestral and choral works, to works for wind instruments, brass quartet, including film scores, for the film series "Dracula".

His trilogy of large scale Genesis based oratorios consists of 'Genesis – Die Schöpfung (2012), Amartema – Der Sündenfall(2013) were well received and completed with the third part Kataklysmos - Sintflut (2015). The first two parts have been recorded. Other large scale works include an oratorio on Revelation Offenbarung des Johannes, the children's opera Das Dschungelbuch, and Robert-Gernhardt-Lieder for alto and orchestra.

== Recordings ==
- Die schöne Stadt - Song cycle on poems of Georg Trakl for soprano and string trio. Recording by Martha Senn, Ensemble Astarte, MusikMuseum 2010
- Genesis - oratorio Susanne Langbein, Andreas Mattersberger, Chor der Akademie St. Blasius, Orchester der Akademie St. Blasius, Karlheinz Siessl MusikMuseum 2011
- Amartema - Der Sündenfall (Oratorium) Susanne Langbein, Bernhard Landauer, Andreas Mattersberger, Orchester der Akademie St. Blasius, Karlheinz Siessl 2016
- Missa pastoralis Chor der Akademie St. Blasius, Orchester der Akademie St. Blasius, Karlheinz Siessl 2019
