= Ruprechtshofen =

- Municipality
- Coat of arms

- Location within Austria
- Coordinates: 48°8′N 15°17′E
- Country: Austria
- State: Lower Austria
- District: Melk

Government
  - Mayor: Leopold Gruber-Doberer

Area
  - Total: 30.57 km^{2} (11.80 sq mi)
- Elevation: 247 m (810 ft)

Population (2018-01-01)
  - Total: 2,315
  - Density: 75.73/km^{2} (196.1/sq mi)
- Time zone: UTC+1 (CET)
  - Summer (DST): UTC+2 (CEST)
- Postal code: 3244
- Area code: 02756
- Website: www.ruprechtshofen.at

Ruprechtshofen is a town in the district of Melk in the Austrian state of Lower Austria.

== Population ==
Historical population
Year	Pop.	±%
1971	1,065	—
1981	1,975	+85.4%
1991	2,116	+7.1%
2008	2,283	+7.9%
