= Leopold Wlach =

Austrian clarinettist (1902–1956)

Leopold Wlach (9 September 1902 – 7 May 1956) was an Austrian clarinetist and clarinet teacher. He was solo clarinetist at the Vienna State Opera/with the Vienna Philharmonics.

== Life ==
Born in Vienna, Wlach first studied clarinet at the Vienna Music Academy with Franz Bartolomey, later with Viktor Polatschek. While still a student, he participated as bass clarinettist in the 1924 premiere of Anton Webern's Six Songs after Poems by Georg Trakl. With an ensemble he undertook a world tour in 1926 two years later Wlach obtained a position as clarinettist with the Vienna State Opera/the Vienna Philharmonic.

As a result of the emigration of his former teacher and orchestral colleague Viktor Polatschek to the United States, Wlach switched to the solo clarinet and took over his teaching position at the Vienna Music Academy in 1931. His pupils included Alfred Prinz, Alfred Boskovsky and Karl Österreicher. Wlach was a co-founder of the "Wind Association of the Vienna Philharmonic Orchestra". Wlach was awarded the "Golden Medal" by the Vienna Mozart Community in 1954. In the same year, the clarinettist suffered a heart attack and, according to his pupil Alfred Prinz, was "no longer fit for duty". Prinz then replaced Wlach in the "Bläservereinigung" and, after winning an audition, succeeded him as principal clarinettist of the Vienna Philharmonic.

Wlach died in Vienna on 7 May 1956 at the age of 53.

== Awards ==
- 1954 Golden Medal of the Mozartgemeinde Wien
