= Jens Thoben =

German clarinetist (born 1976)

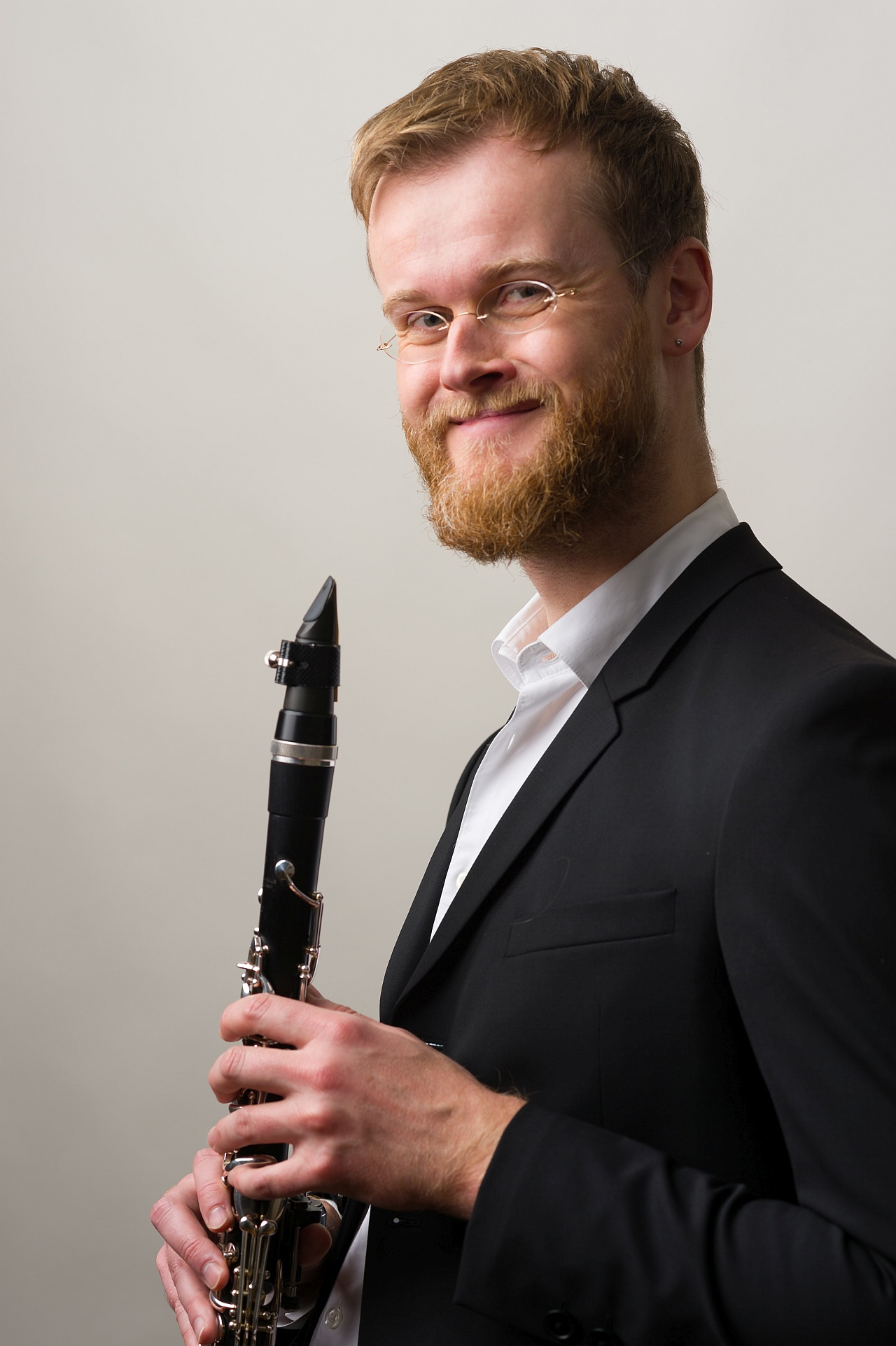
Thoben in 2020

Jens Thoben (born 18 August 1976 in Emsdetten) is a German clarinetist, an orchestra and a chamber musician. He is faculty professor for clarinet and chamber music at Lübeck Academy of Music and certified teacher of Lichtenberger® Applied Physiology of the Voice. His musical interest is broad and applies in particular to formats that cross genres.

In addition to the usual clarinets in B♭ and A, Thoben also plays E♭ clarinet, D clarinet, basset horn and bass clarinet.

== Training as a clarinetist ==
Jens Thoben began playing the clarinet at the age of 11. From 1991 to 1996, he studied with Werner Raabe at the Hochschule für Musik Detmold (University of Music Detmold), Münster department. He then continued his studies with Reiner Wehle at the Lübeck Academy of Music, where he obtained his Artistic Diplom in 2001. During his studies he had chamber music lessons with Walter Levin (LaSalle Quartet) and took part in international master classes with Eduard Brunner and Wolfgang Meyer.

During his training, Thoben received the following awards:

- 1998 special prize at the 35th Possehl Music Prize, Lübeck.
- 1998–2001 Scholarship of the Oscar-und-Vera-Ritter-Stiftung, Hamburg
- 2000 Grant of the Marie-Luise-Imbusch-Foundation, Lübeck
- 2000–2002 Scholarship of the Villa Musica
- 2001 1st prize and orchestra and audience prize at the International Carl-Maria-von-Weber Competition of the European Classic Festival Ruhr
- 2001 3rd prize at the International Carl Nielsen Competition, Odense

== Activity in the orchestra and as soloist ==
Jens Thoben played in the Bundesjugendorchester (National Youth Orchestra of Germany) in 1993–1996, in the Junge Deutsche Philharmonie (Youg German Philharmonic) in 1998–2001, and in 2001–2002 as a scholarship holder of the Orchestra Academy of the Bavarian Radio Symphony Orchestra conducted by Lorin Maazel.

In 2002, he became 1st solo clarinetist of the Duisburg Philharmonic Orchestra (Deutsche Oper am Rhein (German Opera on the Rhine) Düsseldorf Duisburg). In 2015, he gave up this position in favour of freelance and teaching activities. Engagements as solo clarinetist connect him with, among others, the Bavarian State Orchestra Munich, the Deutsche Oper Berlin (German Opera Berlin), and the Staatskapelle Dresden. He works with renowned conductors such as Kirill Petrenko, Sir Colin Davis, Dmitrij Kitajenko, Joana Mallwitz, Omer Meir Wellber and Lahav Shani.

As a soloist he played with various orchestras in Germany and Denmark (clarinet concerts by, among others, WA Mozart, Carl Nielsen, Carl Maria von Weber, Carl Stamitz and Max Bruch (with viola))

== Activity as a chamber musician ==
Jens Thoben was a member of the wind quintet Quinteto Viento in Münster (1995–1997), the basset horn Trio DeVienne (1997–2001) and played in the Trio Raro together with Jan Larsen, principal violist of the NDR Elbphilharmonie Orchestra and Tilman Krämer, piano, Hochschule für Musik Freiburg (University of Music Freiburg) (1998–2008). He also played basset horn in the Ensemble of Wind Players Sabine Meyer and the Trio di Clarone from 2001 until their dissolution in 2012 and 2018 respectively (when expanded as a quintet, together with Shirley Brill).

Jens Thoben has performed at festivals such as the Schleswig-Holstein Music Festival, the Lucerne Festival, the Schubertiade Schwarzenberg, the Rheingau Musik Festival and the Menuhin Festival Gstaad. As a member of the Berlin post-genre sextet hear now berlin he enters border areas between avant-garde, Neue Musik (new music), jazz, minimal music and pop.

== Participation in projects ==
- 2014: In Henry Purcells "King Arthur" in a 4-person version by the directing duo Rainer and Karsten Süßmilch ("sweet.milk") at Schauspiel Hannover he performed as a clarinetist, actor and singer.
- 2018: In Universe, Incomplete: an evening about Charles Ives by Christoph Marthaler, at the RuhrTriennale Bochum he was one of the performing instrumentalists.

== Vocal and voice physiology training ==
In 2010, Thoben began training at the Lichtenberger Institute for Applied Physiology of the Voice and graduated in 2014 with a teaching certificate. The Lichtenberger® Institute conveys the scientific findings and research results on the interrelationships between physical processes in the body, especially the sensory nervous system, of a musician and the production of sound, generated either with the voice through singing and speaking or a musical instrument, and the possible interactions and feedbacks. Ultimately, this involves previously unknown methods for optimising sound, but also for reducing the physical effort associated with speaking, singing and playing an instrument.

From 2014 to 2017, he completed private vocal studies in Berlin with the mezzo-soprano Regina Jakobi with a focus on early music.

== Activity as an educator ==
In 2014, Thoben was interim professor of clarinet at the Folkwang University of the Arts, and from 2014 to 2020 assistant to Prof. Martin Spangenberg (clarinet) at the Hochschule für Musik Hanns Eisler Berlin (Hanns Eisler Academy of Music Berlin) ). From 2015 onwards, he dedicated himself to teaching in his own studio in Berlin with a focus on Lichtenberger® applied Physiology of the Voice..

Since summer 2020, Jens Thoben is faculty professor for clarinet and chamber music at Lübeck Academy of Music.
