= Nicolai Pfeffer =

German clarinetist and music editor

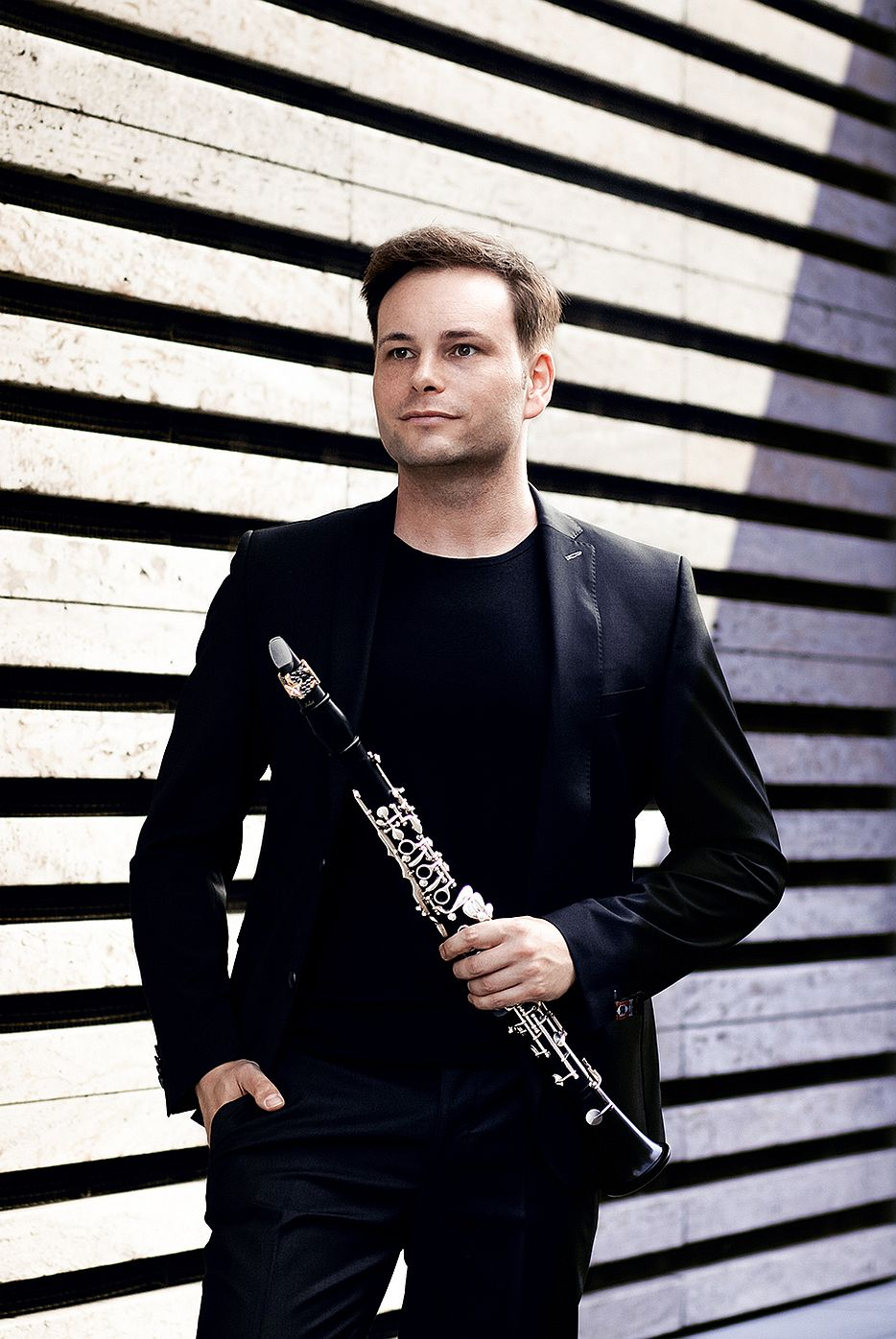

Background information
- Born: September 20, 1985 (age 41); Fulda, Germany
- Genres: Classical music (Solo and Chamber Music)
- Occupations: Soloist, Clarinet Professor, Music Editor
- Instrument: Clarinet (German system)
- Years active: 2006–present
- Labels: NovAntiqua Records, CAvI Music
- Website: official Website in English

Nicolai Pfeffer (born 20 September 1985) is a German clarinetist, music editor and ordinary clarinet professor at the "Talent Music Master Courses University of Music" in Brescia, Italy.

== Training as a clarinetist ==
Born in Fulda, Pfeffer began playing the clarinet at the age of 12. In 2004, he began clarinet studies at the Hochschule für Musik und Tanz Köln, where he was accepted into the master class of Ralph Manno. In 2009, he passed the artistic matriculation exam, and two years later he completed his studies and was awarded a Master of Music "with distinction" in Solo and Chamber Music. Further education included a guest study at the Indiana University Bloomington in the US with Howard Klug, as well as numerous other international master and chamber music courses, such as with Sabine Meyer, Sharon Kam, Anthony Spiri, Karl Leister, Alfred Prinz, Sir Alan Hacker, and Charles Neidich.

== Activity as soloist and chamber musician ==
Pfeffer has performed with the Deutsche Kammerphilharmonie Bremen, the Oper Köln, the Radio-Sinfonie-Orchester Frankfurt, the Kammerphilharmonie Bremen, and the Bamberger Symphonikers. In the summer of 2018, he made his solo debut with Rossini's Clarinet Concerto in a specially produced Urtext edition with the La Scala Orchestra under Maestro Fabio Luisi. He has performed at Munich's Herkulessaal, the Berlin Philharmonie, the Gewandhaus, and the Kölner Philharmonie, and has appeared at numerous festivals in Europe, the United States, South America, and the Middle East.

Pfeffer has notable collaborations as a soloist with the Florence Orchestra della Toscana and with Markus Stenz. Two CDs have resulted from joint concerts.

As chamber musician, Pfeffer regularly performs chamber concerts with his colleagues.

== Repertoire ==
Pfeffer devotes himself to a broad repertoire, primarily from the classical and romantic periods. Where possible, his performances are based on historical performance practice, using historical instruments or replicas.

== Teaching ==
Pfeffer is a lecturer for clarinet, partly also for didactics and methodology, among others at the Hochschule für Musik und Tanz Köln, the Hochschule für Musik, Theater und Medien Hannover and the Hochschule für Künste Bremen. Since October 2022, he holds a clarinet professorship at the Talent Music Master Courses University of Music in Brescia, mainly for the Artist Diploma and University Degree Programmes He also gives national and international master classes and lectures on musicology. Furthermore, he is a juror for national and international clarinet competitions. Pfeffer's publications can be found in international journals such as "The Clarinet" and "Rohrblatt".

== Music editing ==
Another area of Pfeffer's activity is the creation of new editions of chamber music and concertante clarinet works. The previous editions are regarded as reference editions in international comparison. These editions, as well as his own arrangements, have been published by G. Henle Verlag, Breitkopf & Härtel and Edition Peters. He and many other prominent colleagues have used these versions in their CD and radio productions. Pfeffer also makes special arrangements for prominent colleagues such as Ralph Manno, Jonathan Cohler, Andrew Marriner, Gabor Varga, Pavel Vinnitsky, Sérgio Fernandes Pires, Anette Maiburg, Sebastian Manz, Guido Schiefen, Sabine Meyer, Andreas Ottensamer, and the Signum Saxophone Quartet.

In the 2019/2020 season, Pfeffer-crafted orchestrations of Italian opera fantasias were premiered by the Dubrovnik Symphony Orchestra, the Israel Chamber Orchestra, and the Israeli Raanana Symphonette. Further performances by other orchestras followed.

Pfeffer assists Henle Verlag in publishing their clarinet repertoire, and also assists F. Arthur Uebel in the development and improvement of German-designed clarinets.

== Publications ==
=== Editions (selection) ===
- Double Concerto in E minor for clarinet (or violin), viola and orchestra. opus 88 by Max Bruch. Frankfurt am Main: C.F. Peters 2010.
- Eight Pieces op. 83 by Max Bruch, Edition Diewa 2011
- Trio in D minor for clarinet, (or violin), violoncello and piano op. 3 by Alexander Zemlinsky. Munich: Edition Diewa 2012.
- Clarinet Concerto in F minor op. 5 by Bernhard Henrik Crusell. G. Henle Verlag 2014.
- Introduzione e Tema con Variazioni B-dur by Gioachino Rossini. Breitkopf & Härtel 2015
- Clarinet Concerto in B♭ major, op. 11 by Bernhard Henrik Crusell. G. Henle Verlag 2015.
- Clarinet Concerto in E♭ major op. 1 by Bernhard Henrik Crusell. G. Henle Verlag 2016.
- Fantasiestücke by Niels Wilhelm Gade, G. Henle Verlag 2017.
- Clarinet Concerto in B♭ major by Johann Stamitz, G. Henle Verlag 2021
- Rigoletto-Fantasy for clarinet, piano, clarinet and orchestra by Luigi Bassi, Breitkopf & Härtel 2021 (formerly by Pfefferkorn-Musikverlag)
- Rigoletto-Fantasy for clarinet and string orchestra by Luigi Bassi, TRIO Musik Edition Nowotny & Lamprecht OHG 2021
- Duo in B minor by Johannes Brahms, TRIO Musik Edition 2022

=== Discography ===
- Johannes Brahms, Sonatas op. 120 – Piano Pieces op. 119, CAvI Music 2018 (with Felix Wahl, piano).
- Affinità elettive / Elective affinities Wolfgang Amadeus Mozart Clarinet Concerto in A major, K. 622, Rondo K. 373 (arr. Nicolai Pfeffer), Sperai vicino il lido K. 368 (arr. Andreas Tarkmann), Symphony No. 29 in A major KV 201; Nicolai Pfeffer, clarinet; Orchestra della Toscana; conductor Markus Stenz, NovAntiqua Records NA55 2021.
