= Julian Bliss =

British clarinettist (born 1989)

- Born: 1989 (age 36–37)
- Origin: Harpenden, Hertfordshire, United Kingdom
- Genres: Classical, Chamber music, Jazz
- Occupations: Soloist, chamber musician, clarinet designer
- Instrument: Clarinet
- Label: Signum Classics
- Website: julianbliss.com

Julian Bliss (born 1989) is a British clarinettist and clarinet designer. He has performed as a soloist, chamber and jazz musician, notably with his teacher Sabine Meyer. He also designed the Bliss Clarinet for instrument manufacturer Leblanc.

== Education ==
Bliss started playing clarinet at age 4, when he was given a Lyons C Clarinet, a clarinet designed to let children begin the clarinet four or more years younger than usual. Most students do not play wind instruments until age 11 or 12.

In 1997 Bliss began studying at The Purcell School for Young Musicians. Bliss earned his Postgraduate Artist's Diploma from Indiana University in 2001 at age 12, but he was not awarded his diploma until he graduated from high school. He studied first with David Johnston at Harpenden, Paul Harris, then with Howard Klug at Indiana and with Sabine Meyer in Germany at the Musikhochschule Lübeck.

== Music career ==
Bliss won the 2001 Concerto Soloists Young Artists Competition in Philadelphia. In 2002, he performed at Queen Elizabeth II's Golden Jubilee (during the Prom at the Palace) by royal invitation. He also performed at the Queen's 80th birthday.

He has appeared as a soloist with many orchestras, including the London Philharmonic, Royal Northern Sinfonia, Royal Liverpool Philharmonic Orchestra, BBC Symphony, Royal Philharmonic, Orchestre National de France, Northern Chamber Orchestra, the City of Birmingham Symphony Orchestra, Seattle Symphony, BBC Philharmonic, NHK Symphony, Malaysian Philharmonic, Bergen Philharmonic, Sao Paulo Symphony, Auckland Philharmonia and the Academy of St Martin in the Fields. He has performed at Lincoln Center in New York City, the Louvre in Paris, Wigmore Hall in London and the Concertgebouw in Amsterdam.

Bliss also has a career as a chamber musician. He has collaborated with many of the world's top classical artists, including Joshua Bell, Carducci Quartet, James Baillieu, Julien Quentin, Kathryn Stott, Stephen Kovacevich, Elena Bashkirova, Julian Rachlin, Steven Isserlis and Hélène Grimaud. In 2022, composer John Mackey wrote his Clarinet Concerto "Divine Mischief" for Bliss, and was given its world premiere by Bliss and the Dallas Winds October 2022.

He was the subject of a three-part made-for-television documentary entitled "Gifted". He also appeared on the Today program in the United States and on NHK in Japan.

Bliss is currently the International Visiting Professor of Clarinet at the Royal Northern College of Music.

== Leblanc Bliss ==
In collaboration with Leblanc, Bliss developed the Leblanc Bliss clarinet. Says Bliss of the line: "I know I can pick up any Bliss clarinet and be able to perform at the level to which I am accustomed." He characterises the clarinet's design as "wicked".

The design deviates from standard synthetic clarinets in that it does not use acrylonitrile butadiene styrene (ABS), but instead uses a custom composite that produces 20% more amplitude. The barrel and bell are narrower (and thus lighter) than standard clarinets, and the keys are plated in black nickel to differentiate the clarinet's appearance from those with traditional silver-coloured keys. The bore has several tapers and is manufactured to tolerances of hundreds of thousandths of an inch. The right hand trill keys are above the gravity line to reduce the risk of water in the tone holes.

Julian works in the Conn-Selmer marketing team in an expanded partnership position that now includes the role of Clarinet Market Developer.

== Julian Bliss Septet ==
In 2010, Julian formed a group to perform the music of Benny Goodman – the Julian Bliss Septet. The group released their first album – A Tribute to Benny Goodman – in 2012. They have performed several times at the Wigmore Hall and sold-out Ronnie Scott's, Jazz at Lincoln Center, Bermuda Jazz Festival and Amsterdam's Concertgebouw. The Septet includes Julian Bliss (clarinet), Martin Shaw (trumpet), Lewis Wright (vibraphone), Neal Thornton (piano), Colin Oxley (guitar), Tim Thornton (bass), and Ed Richardson (kit).

== Discography ==
- 2002: Prom at the Palace, with various artists, EMI Classics
- 2003: Music for Clarinet and Piano, with Julien Quentin, EMI Classics
- 2007: Krommer Concerto for two clarinets, Spohr Clarinet Concerto No. 4, with Sabine Meyer (Clarinet) and Kenneth Sillito and Academy of St. Martin in the Fields, EMI Classics
- 2009: Best Encores 100, with various artists, EMI Classics
- 2011: Psycho, with Tippett Quartet, Signum Classics
- 2011: The Ancient Question, with Hila Plitmann, Signum Classics
- 2013: A Tribute to Benny Goodman, Julian Bliss Septet, Signum Classics
- 2014: Julian Bliss and Bradley Moore, with Bradley Moore, Signum Classics
- 2014: Mozart and Nielsen Clarinet Concertos, with the Royal Northern Sinfonia, Signum Classics
- 2015: The Shepherd on the Rock, with Ailish Tynan and Christopher Glynn, Signum Classics
- 2016: David Bruce: Gumboots, with Carducci Quartet, Signum Classics
- 2016: Steve Reich: New York Counterpoint, Signum Classics
- 2018: Schubert: Swansong, with Christopher Glynn, Sir John Tomlinson, Sophie Bevan, Alec Frank-Gemmill, Signum Classics
- 2018: Mozart & Weber: Clarinet Quintets, with Carducci Quartet, Signum Classics
- 2019: In The Middle of Things, with Fidelio Trio, Resonus Classics
