= Japan House =

Learning facility at the University of Illinois at Urbana-Champaign

Coordinates: 40.0928°N 88.2179°W

Japan House is a learning facility founded in 1976 by Shozo Sato. It is part of the College of Fine and Applied Arts, at the University of Illinois at Urbana–Champaign. The facility includes three tea rooms, or Chashitsu, a tea garden (Roji) and Japanese rock garden. It currently conducts classes in Japanese tea ceremony, Japanese Aesthetics and Ikebana for university students and members of the community. An annual event at the house welcomes international students. In 2019 an expansion effort was under way.

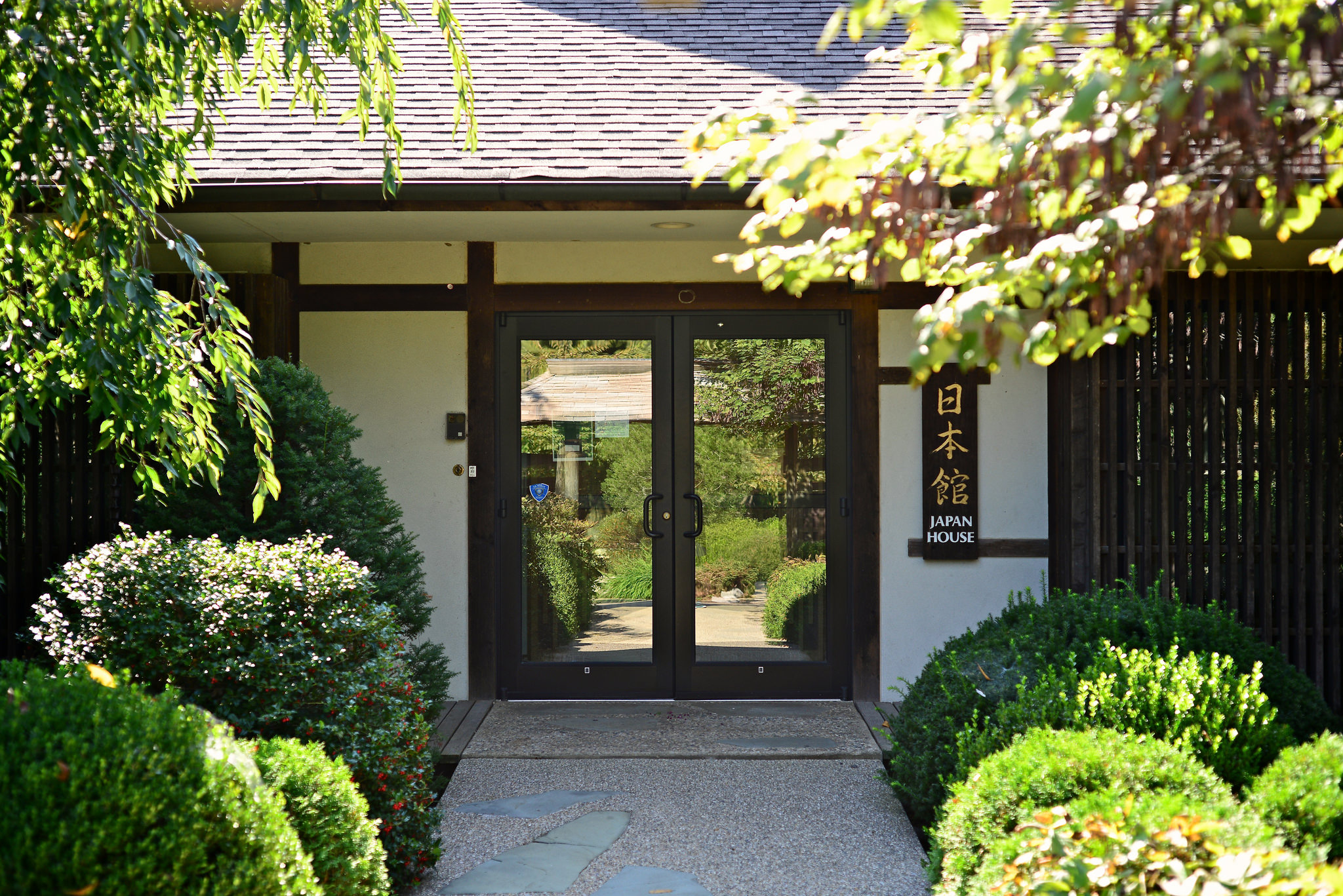
Japan House

== History ==
Japanese artist Shozo Sato arrived at Krannert Center for the Performing Arts as an artist-in-residence in 1964, and began teaching tea ceremony. He struggled to find the right setting for the classes, sometimes even teaching them from his own home. Eventually, after several years, Morton Weir, then Vice Chancellor for Academic Affairs, now Chancellor Emeritus, heard of the rising popularity of these tea ceremonies. He arranged for Professor Sato to be able to use an old Victorian house on campus, at Lincoln Avenue and California (now the site of the Alice B. Campbell Alumni Center).

In the early 1990s Professor Sato retired, leaving the community, and the old Victorian was torn down for redevelopment. Professor Kimiko Gunji, a longtime teaching assistant of Professor Sato, approached her tea school in Japan, the Urasenke Foundation of Tea, and they agreed to donate two tearooms for a new Japan House. With that commitment in hand, Professor Gunji and then Associate Provost Roger Martin moved ahead, receiving commitments for $100,000 from the Japan Illini Club, the Commemorative Association for the Japan World Exposition and the Japan Foundation Center for Global Partnership.

The University had selected a site within the relatively new Arboretum for Japan House. Architect Jack Baker and the firm of Isaksen Glerum Architects PC designed the structure and construction began. Japanese master carpenter, Seiji Suzuki, then visited and installed three Japanese tearooms into the empty building. The new Japan House was dedicated on June 18, 1998.

Over the years, Japan House has been the site of many programs, events and visits, ranging from tea ceremonies, presentations and performances of traditional Japanese culture. Japan House has also worked with other units on campus, working to bring Japanese exhibitions and performances to Krannert Center for the Performing Arts, the Spurlock Museum, and Krannert Art Museum.

In 2012 Professor Jennifer Gunji-Ballsrud became the third director of Japan House, after the retirement of her mother, Kimiko Gunji. Not long afterwards, Professor Shozo Sato returned to the Champaign-Urbana community.

== Japan House Events and Programs ==
Japan House is open to the public during events such as tea ceremony, Spring and Fall Open Houses with visiting artists, tea ceremonies and garden tours, and the annual Matsuri Japanese festival held in August. Workshops in various Japanese arts such as cooking, calligraphy, yukata dressing, etc.

=== Japan House University Classes ===
ARTJ 199: Special Topics in Japanese Aesthetic Practices (e.g. ikebana, shodo)

ARTJ 209: Chado, the Way of Tea

ARTJ 299: Seminar in Japanese Aesthetics (e.g. Anime thru Studio Ghibli, Queer manga)

ARTJ 301: Manga, the Art of Image and Word

ARTJ 302: Introduction to Japanese Animation

ARTJ 391: Independent Study in Japanese Aesthetics

ARTJ 397: Zen, Tea, and Power

ARTJ 398: Designing Everyday life in Modern Japan

ARTJ 399: Japan House Internship

=== Japan House Community Classes ===
Chado Urasenke Tankokai Urbana-Champaign Association

Illinois Prairie Chapter of the Ikenobo Ikebana Society of America

== James and Lorene Bier Gardens at Japan House ==
The Japan House gardens were designed and created by James Bier. Mr. Bier continues to maintain the gardens along with a group of volunteers. The gardens are free and open to the public from dawn to dusk, although the walled tea garden is closed in icy weather.

== See also ==
- Nick Offerman
- Shozo Sato
