= Annelien Van Wauwe =

Belgian clarinetist (born 1987)

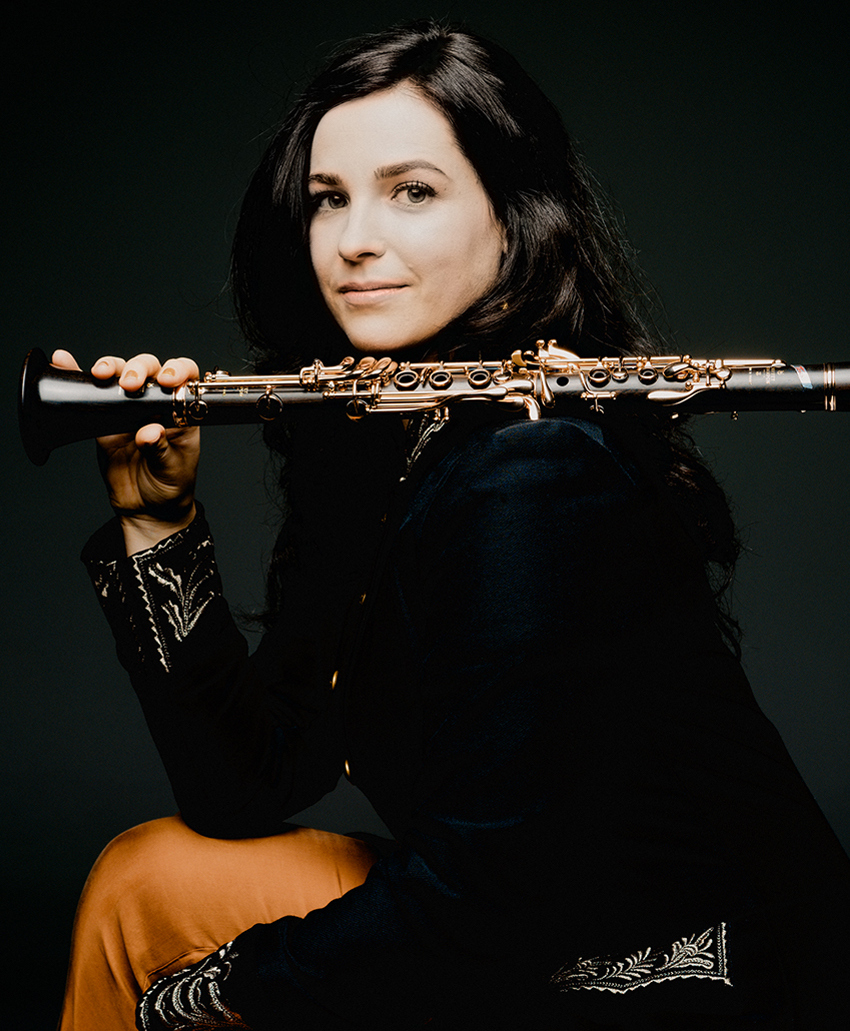
- 2019
- Born: 29 September 1987 (age 39); Dendermonde, Belgium
- Education: Musikhochschule Lübeck; Paris Conservatory; Accademia di Santa Cecilia; Hochschule für Musik Hanns Eisler
- Occupations: Classical clarinetist; Academic teacher
- Organizations: Ensemble Carousel, Brussels
- Awards: 2nd prize of ARD International Music Competition, 1st prizes of international competitions in Turin, Brussels, Lisbon, Revereto, Oldenburg and Berlin
- Performances per Year approximately 35 Agency; General Management: Rayfield Allied Artists Management, Mrs. Cinzia Crescini, London (UK) Hobbies; Yoga and sports Residence; Berlin, Germany
- Website: www.annelienvanwauwe.com

Annelien Van Wauwe (born 29 September 1987) is a Belgian clarinetist who performs internationally as a soloist. She studied with Sabine Meyer and other internationally known teachers. She has won numerous international competitions and performs with top international orchestras and as a sought-after soloist at international festivals, but is also active in chamber music with her own ensemble. Several works have been composed especially for her. She is also a principal teacher for historical and modern clarinet at the Royal Conservatory Antwerp. She lives in Mechelen, Belgien.

== Education ==
Van Wauwe was born in Dendermonde, Belgium. She began playing the clarinet at the age of 8. After completing secondary school in 2004, she began her training as a professional clarinetist at the Musikhochschule Lübeck with Sabine Meyer at the age of 17. After graduating there, she continued her education at the Paris Conservatory for music and dance with Pascal Moraguès in 2009 and from January 2010 at the Accademia di Santa Cecilia in Rome with Alessandro Carbonare and then at the Hochschule für Musik Hanns Eisler Berlin with Ralf Forster, solo-clarinetist of Konzerthausorchester Berlin and Wenzel Fuchs and completed a master class in Los Angeles with Yehuda Gilad. In the field of historical performance practice, she studied classical clarinet at the Paris Conservatory with Eric Hoeprich and at the Musikhochschule Trossingen with Ernst Schlader. Her studies have been supported by numerous grants from Belgian and foreign foundations and societies.

During her education Annelien van Wauwe played in the Junge Belgische Philhamonie, the Jeugd en Muziekorkest Antwerp, the Niederländisches Jugendorchester, the Orchestre de Paris under Christoph Eschenbach and 2010 as principal clarinetist in the Gustav Mahler Jugendorchester under Herbert Blomstedt.

== Concertos ==
Van Wauwe has appeared as a soloist in major European concert halls, such as the Tonhalle Zürich, the Palais des Beaux-Arts de Bruxelles, the Konzerthaus Berlin, the Wiener Konzerthaus, the Concertgebouw in Amsterdam, and Wigmore Hall in London. She has performed with orchestras such as the Stuttgart Radio Symphony Orchestra, the Bavarian Radio Symphony Orchestra, the Munich Chamber Orchestra, the BBC Philharmonic Orchestra, the Royal Liverpool Philharmonic Orchestra and the Brussels Philharmonic. In 2018 she performed on a modern basset clarinet the Clarinet Concerto (Mozart) with the BBC Scottish Symphony Orchestra under Thomas Dausgaard during a live broadcast on radio and television worldwide BBC Proms at Royal Albert Hall, London. In early 2019 she appeared in Johannesburg and Pretoria. Van Wauwe has regularly appeared at international festivals including the Lucerne Festival, the Schleswig-Holstein Music Festival, the Festspiele Mecklenburg-Vorpommern, the Kissinger Sommer, and the Festival de Radio France et Montpellier. In 2017, Manfred Trojahn dedicated his Sonata V to her, which she premiered in Zurich and recorded for BBC Radio 3.

She is also active in the field of chamber music and was one of the co-founders of the Brussels chamber music ensemble Carousel in 2018. Van Wauwe is an ambitious yoga enthusiast. She believes that her yoga exercises have a "positive influence on her clarinet playing". Her practice of the discipline led to a specially commissioned concerto based on breathing and meditation by composer Wim Henderickx. It was co-commissioned by the Borletti-Buitoni Trust and BBC Radio 3. This clarinet concerto called SUTRA "will be a spiritual meditation in which extreme virtuosity is coupled with an intense musical experience. Passages of peace, meditation and silence are combined with violent outbursts."

== Educational activity ==
From 2016 to 2021, Van Wauwe was appointed lecturer for modern clarinet at the Royal Conservatory of Antwerp (part of the Artesis Hogeschool Antwerpen). Since 2020, she regularly gives masterclasses and teaches at the Royal Conservatoire in The Hague. She is a juror at international music competitions.

== Awards ==
- 2004: 1st prize of the international Marco Fiorindo competition in Turin
- 2005: 1st prize of the Axion Classics Dexia competition in Brussels
- 2007: 1st prize of the international music competition for youth in Oldenburg, where she also received a special prize
- 2009: 3rd prize of the International Clarinet Competition at the University of Music in Freiburg
- 2012: 1st prize of the sixth edition of the International Audi Mozart Competition in Rovereto
- 2012: 1st Prize of the International Clarinet Competition in Lisbon
- 2012: 2nd prize at ARD International Music Competition in Munich (Note: The 1st and 3rd prize were not awarded, instead the 2nd prize was awarded three times.)
- 2012: Avard of the International Louis-Spohr-Competition in Kassel
- 2015: Award of the VRT cultural channel of the public-law Flemish broadcaster Radio Klara
- 2015: Artist in Residence of BBC in the BBC New Generation Artist Program
- 2018: Prize of the Borletti-Buitoni Foundation
- 2020: Opus Klassik – Prize as a young artist (clarinet) in Berlin

The 2012 ARD competition prize was decisive for her international career.

== Instruments ==
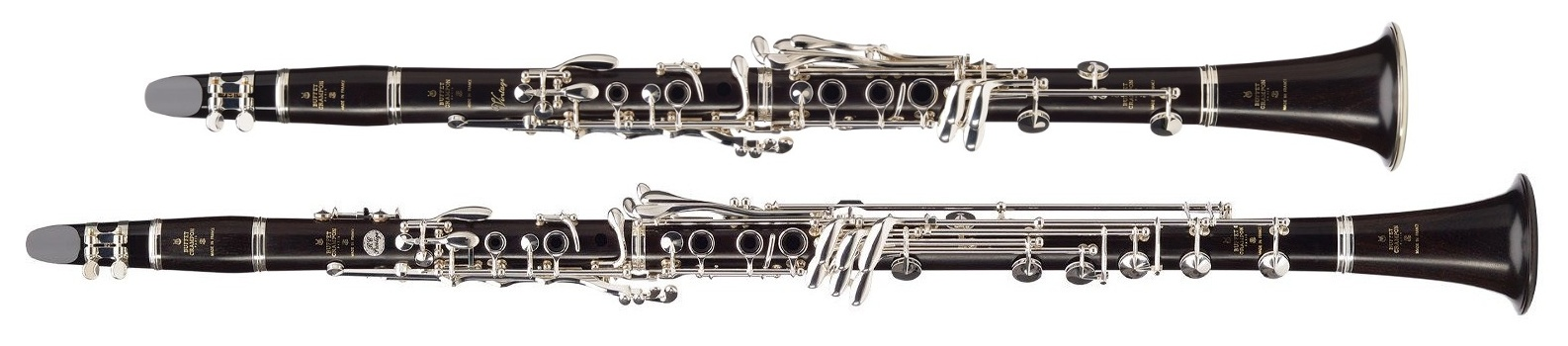
Vintage and Prestige Basset

Van Wauwe plays Vintage clarinets in B♭ and A by Buffet Crampon, optimized by a German clarinet maker (low E improvement added). She performs the Mozart Concerto, like many solo clarinetists today, on a modern basset clarinet, a Prestige by Buffet Crampon.

== Recordings ==
In 2015, Van Wauwe released a CD of clarinet sonatas by Mieczysław Weinberg and Sergei Prokofiev, Weinberg-Prokofiev, with the pianist Lucas Blondeel, and in 2019 the CD Belle époque with the Orchestre National de Lille and its music director Alexandre Bloch was released, which includes works by Claude Debussy, Manfred Trojahn, Gabriel Pierné, Johannes Brahms and Charles-Marie Widor. Mark Pullinger of Gramophone, in his review of Belle époque, praises the artist for the "great sensitivity to her phrasing" and emphasizes the first recording of Trojahn's Rhapsody, the Caprice of which he calls a "high-wire act for the soloist, which Van Wauwe navigates with aplomb". Another reviewer, Stuart Sillitoe of MusicWeb International, describes Van Wauwe as a "formidable clarinettist", and praises the playing on the entire disc. He characterizes her performance of Debussy's Première Rhapsodie as "superb", so good as now be his "favourite" over all of his other recordings of the work. In 2022, she recorded Mozart's masterpiece for clarinet, the Concerto in A major K622, which she co-recorded with the world premiere of the Concerto Sutra by Belgian composer Wim Henderickx (April 2022, Pentatone).

== Personal ==
Annelien Van Wauwe resides in Mechelen, Belgium.
