= Shōzō Satō =

Japanese theatre director (1933–2025)

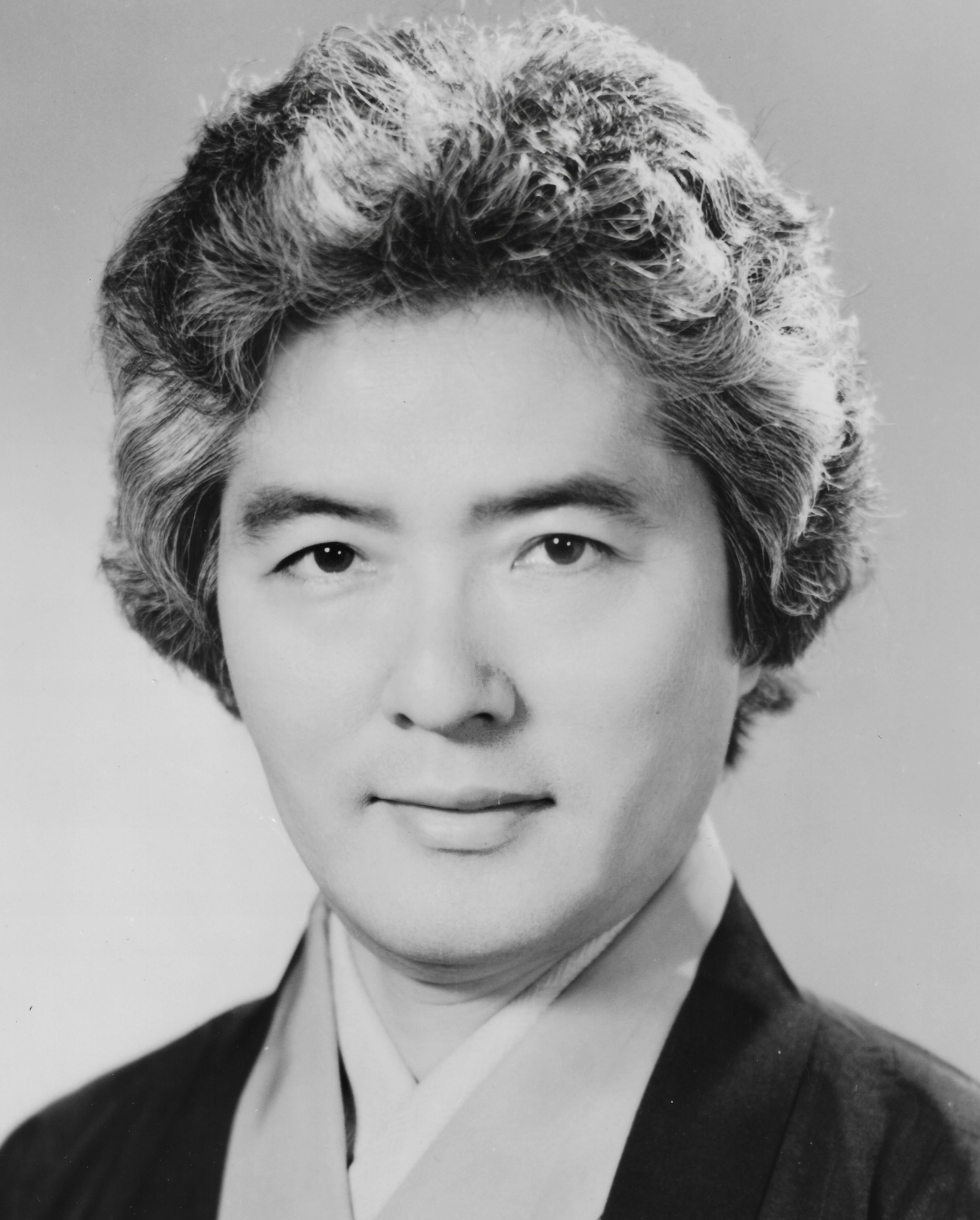
Shozo Sato during his time as Artist in Residence at Krannert Center for the Performing Arts

Shōzō Satō (佐藤 昌三, Satō Shōzō, May 18, 1933 – May 4, 2025) was an artist, author, calligrapher, playwright and a professor emeritus of the College of Art and Design at the University of Illinois at Urbana–Champaign. He was the founder and former director of Japan House, and a former artist-in-residence at the Krannert Center for the Performing Arts.

Satō was an internationally renowned master of Japanese traditional arts, such as Ikebana, Japanese Calligraphy, Sumi-e, Japanese Aesthetics, Japanese Traditional Dance, and Japanese Tea Ceremony. He was also a visionary theater director, most known for adapting Western classics into a traditional Japanese Kabuki style.

== Life and career ==
Satō was born in Kobe, Japan on May 18, 1933, and grew up in Kamakura. He obtained a degree in Fine Arts from Bunka Gakuen College in Tokyo, studied music at the Tokyo Seisen School, studied theatre at the Toho Academy of Performing Arts in Tokyo, and trained with kabuki artist Nakamura Kanzaburō XVII. He studied Japanese Tea Ceremony under Kishimoto Kōsen. He taught and performed in Japan until the early 60s.

Satō first arrived at the University of Illinois in 1964 as a visiting artist. In 1968, he founded the Japanese Arts and Culture Program, where he taught classes in traditional Japanese arts, such as Calligraphy, Sumi-e, Ikebana, Kabuki, Tea Ceremony, and Japanese Aesthetics.

He was known for adapting traditional western theatre into Kabuki style productions. His adaptations include Macbeth, Medea, Othello, Faust, Achilles, Madame Butterfly and, The Mikado. His last academic production was a Kabuki adaptation of Othello, titled Iago's Plot (2017), at the University of Illinois, Urbana-Champaign, at the Krannert Center for the Performing Arts.

He was a visiting professor at Northwestern University in Evanston, Illinois.

Satō was the author of The Art of Arranging Flowers: A Complete Guide to Japanese Ikebana, published in 1968 by Harry N. Abrams, Incorporated, New York, NY. The volume was printed and bound in Japan. With the assistance of Thomas A. Heenan, Satō was the author of The Art of Sumi-E: Appreciation, Techniques, and Application, published in 1984 by Kodansha International Limited, Tokyo, Japan. The volume was printed in Japan and distributed in the U.S. by Kodansha International/USA Limited through Harper & Row, Publishers, Incorporated, New York, NY.

Satō retired from teaching in 1992 and moved to Northern California where he established a Center for Japanese Art.

Satō officiated at the wedding of actors Nick Offerman and Megan Mullally on September 20, 2003.

In 2016, Satō returned to Champaign, Illinois, where he taught calligraphy, Sumi-e, and Zen philosophy.

Satō died on May 4, 2025, at the age of 91.

== Awards and honors ==
In 2004, he was awarded the Japanese Order of the Sacred Treasure.

== Bibliography ==
=== Books ===
- 1965: The Art of Arranging Flowers: A Complete Guide to Japanese Ikebana
- 1984: The Art of Sumi-E: Appreciation, Techniques, and Application
- 2004: Soul of Japan: Introducing Traditional Japanese Arts to New Generations
- 2010: Sumi-e: The Art of Japanese Ink Painting
- 2013: Ikebana: The Art of Arranging Flowers
- 2014: Shodo: The Quiet Art of Japanese Zen Calligraphy, Learn the Wisdom of Zen Through Traditional Brush Painting
- 2017: Tea Ceremony: Explore the unique Japanese tradition of sharing tea
- 2017: Ikebana: Create beautiful flower arrangements with this traditional Japanese art
- 2022: Chazen: Zen Wisdom for Jeans & a T-shirt

=== Plays ===
- 1978: Kabuki Macbeth
- 1981: Kabuki Madame Butterfly
- 1982: Kabuki Medea
- 1986: Kabuki Faust
- 1988: Kabuki Othello
- 1991: Achilles: A Kabuki Play
- 1996: Iago's Plot
- 1997: For Love, Reconstructed from Romeo and Juliet
- 2005: Kabuki Lady Macbeth
