= Bernhard Crusell =

Finnish composer and clarinettist (1775–1838)

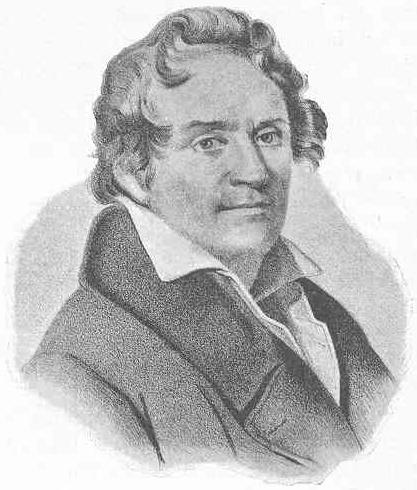
Bernhard Crusell (1826)

Bernhard Henrik Crusell (15 October 1775 – 28 July 1838) was a Finland-Swedish clarinetist, composer and translator, "the most significant and internationally best-known Finnish-born classical composer and indeed, – the outstanding Finnish composer before Sibelius".

== Early life and training ==
Crusell was born in Uusikaupunki (Nystad), Finland, into a poor family of bookbinders. His grandfather, Bernhard Kruselius had learned the trade of bookbinding in Turku and Stockholm, then settled in Pori where he fathered nine children, including Crusell's father Jakob, who also became a bookbinder. In 1765, after Jakob completed his apprenticeship, he moved to Uusikaupunki and married Helena Ylander, but she died about one year later. In 1769 he married Margaretha Messman. The couple had four children, but Bernhard was the only one who lived to become an adult. Later in life Crusell described this period of his life, writing in the third person:

In his little town of birth there was only one person who had an active interest in music: a shop assistant who could be heard in the evenings playing the flute for his own amusement. One night, the four-year-old Berndt was sitting in the street, leaning against a wall, on top of the world with admiration for the sweet melodies. His parents, who had been looking for their son for a long time, scolded him severely, but this could not stop the boy from returning to his favourite spot the next evening. This time he got a beating for his disobedience, but as it was to no avail, they left him to his "craze", confident that he would come back home as soon as the flute went silent...

When Crusell was eight, the family moved to Perttula, the rural village of Nurmijärvi about 23 miles north of Helsinki. His innate interest in music continued, and he learned to play a friend's clarinet by ear. He soon began to receive training from a member of the Nyland regimental band.

In 1788, when he was thirteen, another family friend, aware of the young man's natural ability, took him to see Major O. Wallenstjerna at Sveaborg, a Swedish fortress built on six islands off the coast of Helsinki. The educated officers of the fort had significant influence on the culture and politics of the city. Wallenstjerna, impressed with Crusell's playing, recruited him as a volunteer member of the Sveaborg military band and gave him a place to live with his own family. Crusell received an education at Sveaborg and excelled in music and languages. In 1791 Wallenstjerna transferred to Stockholm and Crusell went with him. Although Crusell spent most of the rest of his life in Sweden, he always considered himself a Finn. In his final years in a letter to Runeberg he called himself a "finsk landsman" (a fellow Finn; note that "Finn" at the time did not refer to the language). He maintained his travel diaries in Swedish.

== Career as a clarinetist ==
In Stockholm, Crusell continued his studies and established himself as a clarinet soloist. In 1792, at age sixteen, he received an appointment as the director of the regimental band, and in 1793 became principal clarinet with the Hovkapellet (Royal Court Orchestra), which was directed by his composition teacher, the German composer Abbé Vogler. In 1798 he received financial assistance which enabled him to live in Berlin for a few months and study with the well-known German clarinetist Franz Tausch (1762–1817). Tausch had founded the German school of clarinet playing which emphasized beauty of tone over technique. Crusell's progress was swift, and he performed at concerts in Berlin and Hamburg before returning to Sweden. The review of the Hamburg concert in the Allgemeine musikalische Zeitung was positive.

Crusell lived in Sweden for the rest of his life, going back to Finland only once. After a trip to St. Petersburg, on his return trip to Sweden, he performed in Helsinki on 7 July 1801, with the pianist Fredrik Lithander as his accompanist, and in Turku on 30 July, in a concert organized by the orchestra of the Turku Society of Music.

In Stockholm Crusell had become acquainted with the French ambassador to Sweden. This friendship encouraged and enabled him to undertake a trip to Paris in 1803. There he performed and also studied clarinet with Jean-Xavier Lefèvre at the newly formed Conservatoire. On 2 June, with the encouragement of Lefèvre, he purchased a new mouthpiece made by Michel Amlingue and on 14 September a six-key C clarinet made by Jean Jacques Baumann. Before about 1800 Crusell had been playing with the reed turned up, but later turned it down, the modern practice and a position more compatible with cantabile playing. Exactly when he did this is not well established, but he may have favored the reed-above position because of a lack of evenness in his teeth.

Around this time the Théâtre-Italien de Paris offered Crusell a position as first clarinetist. Gustav IV Adolf of Sweden, anxious to keep Crusell in the royal orchestra, denied a petition for an extension of leave and as a positive inducement made him chief conductor of the bodyguard regiment bands. After Crusell returned to Stockholm he remained with the Royal Court Orchestra until 1833.

In June 1811 Crusell made another trip to see Tausch in Berlin, and the two men discussed clarinets. Later that month he visited a benefactor in Leipzig, and in July he purchased a new instrument from Heinrich Grenser in Dresden. His Grenser clarinet was an advanced design for the time, with eleven keys. (A picture of Crusell's Grenser clarinet can be found here.) Later, in 1822, he again went to Dresden and purchased additional clarinets from the Grenser shop's successor, Grenser & Wiesner, and from Carl Gottlob Bormann. The Stockholm Music Museum possesses five clarinets made by Grenser & Wiesner in 1822 or later, four with eleven, and one with ten keys.

During his career Crusell became increasingly well known as a clarinet soloist, not only in Sweden but also in Germany, and even in England. He played compositions by Beethoven, Jadin, Krommer, Lebrun, Mozart, and Peter Winter, among others. Of more than 50 known concert reviews (most of which appeared in the German Allgemeine musikalische Zeitung), not even one had any negative comment. Carl Abraham Mankell (1802–1868), music critic of Svenska Tidningen (Swedish News), admired Crusell's playing for the roundness of his tone and its evenness in quality throughout the range of the instrument. Crusell was also greatly admired for his pianissimo playing. "It is indicative of his reputation that he was for many years the best-paid musician in the court orchestra."

== Career as a composer ==
Between 1791 and 1799 Crusell studied music theory and composition with Abbé Vogler and another German teacher, Daniel Boritz, when Böritz was resident in Stockholm. In 1803 while in Paris Crusell studied composition at the Conservatoire with Gossec and Berton. He composed pieces, including concertos and chamber works, not only for his own use, but also for other wind players in the court orchestra. In 1811 he travelled to Leipzig where he established a relationship with the music publisher Bureau de Musique, which became part of C. F. Peters in 1814.

From 1818 to 1837 during the summers he conducted military bands in Linköping, providing them with arrangements of marches and overtures by Rossini, Spohr, and Weber and composing pieces for male choir. In 1822 he published three volumes of songs to texts by the Swedish poet Tegnér and others, and in 1826 another volume, Frithiofs saga, with ten songs to texts by Tegnér. An opera, Lilla slavinnan (The Little Slave Girl), was first performed in Stockholm in 1824 and was repeated 34 times in the following 14 years.

== Marriage ==
In 1799, Crusell married Anna Sofia Klemming. He was father-in-law to the German bassoonist Frans Preumayr.

== Other accomplishments and awards ==
Crusell was skilled with languages, translating the important Italian, French, and German operas for performances in Sweden. His translation of Mozart's Le nozze di Figaro, first performed in 1821, resulted in his induction into the Geatish Society, an association of literary academics in Sweden. In 1837 he was awarded a gold medal by the Swedish Academy and was inducted into the Order of Vasa, for service to the state and society. The National Library of Sweden holds two manuscript autobiographies.

== Crusell Music Festival ==
Since 1982 a Crusell Week has been held each summer in Uusikaupunki, Finland (Bernhard Crusell's place of birth). The festival is dedicated to music for woodwind instruments. Crusell Week's Artistic Director is Jussi Särkkä.

== List of musical works ==
Dates of composition and first publication and other information are from Asiado, Dahlström, and WorldCat (OCLC), unless otherwise noted.

=== Soloist with orchestra ===
- Clarinet Concerto in E♭ major, Op. 1
  - Movements: Allegro – Adagio – Rondo. Allegretto
  - Completed in 1808? or 1810; published Leipzig, A. Kühnel, 1811, plate no. 907 (after 1814 reprinted by C. F. Peters).
  - Duration: ca. 22 minutes.
  - Other publications:
    - Edition by Fabian Dahlström with assistance of Margareta Rörby. Stockholm: Edition Reimers, 1995, full score (xxi, 158 pages; includes prefatory notes in English and Swedish and "Critical commentary", pp. 153–158) OCLC 34351150.
    - Edition for clarinet and piano by Brent Coppenbarger. Wiesbaden [etc.]: Breitkopf & Härtel, 2000 (copyright 1990, Monteux: Musica Rara), score (45 pages) and part OCLC 66044639.
    - Edition for clarinet and piano by Pamela Weston. Vienna: Universal Edition, 1990, score (30 pages) and part (11 pages) OCLC 277190887, 24315821, 369133146; reprint 2004, ISBN 978-3-7024-1558-7, OCLC 316025438.
    - Urtext Edition for clarinet and piano by Nicolai Pfeffer. Munich: Henle, 2016, cat. no. HN 1208, score (31 pages) and part (11 pages), ISMN 979-0-2018-1208-3.
- Clarinet Concerto in F minor, Op. 5 ("Grand")
  - Movements: Allegro – Andante pastorale – Rondo. Allegretto
  - First performed 1815; published Leipzig, C. F. Peters, 1817, plate no. 1335.
  - Duration: ca. 24 minutes.
  - Other publications:
    - Edition for clarinet and piano, with cadenza, by Jost Michaels. Hamburg: Sikorski, ca. 1962, plate H.S.549, cat. no. 549, score (35 pages) and part OCLC 277176309, 221334057.
    - Edition for clarinet and piano by Pamela Weston. Vienna: Universal Edition, 1991, score (29 pages) and part (11 pages) OCLC 26218888.
    - Urtext Edition for clarinet and piano by Nicolai Pfeffer. Munich: Henle, 2015, cat. no. HN 1209, score (31 pages) and part (11 pages), ISMN 979-0-2018-1209-0.
- Clarinet Concerto in B♭ major, Op. 11
  - Movements: Allegro risoluto – Andante moderato – Alla polacca
  - Composed ca. 1807?, later revised and published Leipzig, C. F. Peters, 1829, plate no. 2077.
  - Duration: ca. 25 minutes.
  - Other publications:
    - Edited by Mayer. New York: Edition Peters.
    - Edition for clarinet and piano by Bieger/ Foerster. New York: Edition Peters.
    - Edition for clarinet and piano by Pamela Weston. Vienna: Universal Edition, 1988, cat. no. 18267, score (36 pages) and part (12 pages) OCLC 277176313, 29756553.
    - Urtext Edition for clarinet and piano by Nicolai Pfeffer. Munich: Henle, 2015, cat. no. HN 1210, score (32 pages) and part (12 pages), ISMN 979-0-2018-1210-6.
- Sinfonia concertante in B♭ major, for clarinet, horn, bassoon and orchestra, Op. 3
  - Movements: Allegro – Andante sostenuto – Allegro ma non tanto
  - First performed 1804; revised and published Leipzig, C. F. Peters, 1830.
  - Other publications:
    - Amsterdam: KW-Verlag, 1961, score (68 pages) and 22 parts OCLC 473737390, 71483351, 21900633.
    - Piano reduction. Amsterdam: KaWe, 1981; plate KW50a, score (18 pages); plate K.51W, 3 solo parts OCLC 11704272, 495858539, 314306269; reprint 1985 OCLC 314418643.
- Concertino in B♭ major, for bassoon and orchestra
  - Completed and published Leipzig, C. F. Peters, 1829.
  - Other publications:
    - Arrangement for bassoon and piano by Harri Ahmas. Helsinki: Musiikki Fazer Musik, 1984, FM 06658-9, score (33 pages) and part (8 pages) OCLC 12886100, 472360592; reprint [Helsinki?]: Warner/Chappell Music Finland, 1995, ISBN 978-951-757-485-3, OCLC 49790635.
    - Helsinki, Fennica Gehrman Oy, 2015: score (87 pages) and parts, ISMN 979-0-55011-250-6.
- Introduction et Air suedois, for clarinet and orchestra, Op. 12
  - Alternate title: Introduction and Variations for Clarinet and Orchestra, Op. 12
  - Based on a popular song "Supvisa" by Olof Åhlström
  - First performed in 1804 as Variationer på visan: Goda gosse, glaset töm (Variations on the song: "Dear boy, empty the glass")
  - Revised and published Leipzig, 1830.
  - Other publications:
    - Hamburg: Musikverlag Hans Sikorski, 1983, plate H.S. 1263 K, score (23 pages) and part (7 pages) OCLC 271806031.
    - Winterthur: Amadeus, 1992, score (15 pages) part (7 pages) OCLC 496748832, 316294677, 29937522; reprint 2006 OCLC 316294677.
- Airs suedois for bassoon and orchestra (1814)
  - This work is often confused with Introduction et Air suedois for clarinet and orchestra above. It is an entirely different piece. Airs suedois for bassoon has remained relatively obscure because of the loss of the full score. It is nevertheless a fine and interesting work.
  - Orchestrated by Graham Sheen [score available from the editor]. London: Park Publications, 1985, score (35 pages) and part (10 pages) OCLC 83527195.
  - Solo bassoon part and composer's piano reduction published by Emerson Edition, edited by Graham Sheen
    - Recorded by Graham Sheen and Elizabeth Burley on SFZ Music CD "Goodbye, Mr Galliard" SFZM0109
    - Recorded by Knut Sonstevold and Stefan Lindgren on Daphne CD "Fagottissimo"
    - Also: [London]: British Double Reed Society, ca. 1993, score (21 pages) and part OCLC 315579789.

=== Chamber music ===
- Quartet in E♭ major for clarinet, violin, viola and cello, Op. 2
  - Composed 1807?; published Leipzig, A. Kühnel, 1811.
  - Other publications:
    - Edition Peters, cat. no. EKB 019.
    - After the edition by Bernhard Päuler. Winterthur: Amadeus, 2006, score (15 pages) and 4 parts OCLC 143629504, 219822346.
    - Arrangement for 3 clarinets and bass clarinet by Béla Kovács. Leverkusen: Edition Darok, ca. 1996, score (20 pages) and 4 parts OCLC 493914889.
- Quartet in C minor for clarinet, violin, viola and cello, Op. 4
  - Composed 1804?; published Leipzig, C. F. Peters, 1817.
  - Other publications:
    - Edition Peters, cat. no. EKB 039.
    - After the edition by Bernhard Päuler. Winterthur: Amadeus, 2006, score (16 pages) + 4 parts OCLC 143629861, 219816803, 317648992.
    - Manuscript edition by Lyle T. Barkhymer (Indiana University), 1975, score (pp. 53–91) and 4 parts OCLC 13024716.
- Quartet in D major for clarinet, violin, viola and cello, Op. 7
  - Composed 1821?; published Leipzig, C. F. Peters, 1823, cat. nos. 1723 and 1783B.
  - Other publications:
    - Edition Peters, cat. no. EKB 040.
    - Transcription for oboe in C major by Kurt Meier. Winterthur: Amadeus, 2002, score (16 pages) and 4 parts OCLC 216912237, 56612024, 85272139
- Quartet in D major for flute, violin, viola and cello, Op. 8 (Edition Peters EKB 056)
  - Arrangement of Op. 7
  - Composed 1821?; published Leipzig, C. F. Peters, 1823.
  - Other publications:
    - Helsinki: Suomalaisen Musiikin Tiedotuskeskus, 1991, score (25 pages) and 3 parts OCLC 30964138.
    - Edition by Kurt Meier. Winterthur: Amadeus/Bernhard Päuler, 2002, miniature score (16 pages) and 4 parts OCLC 163139099, 519199702, 52367998.
    - Arrangement ("Sonata") for flute and piano by Timo Hongisto. Espoo: Fazer Music, 1990, score (44 pages) and part OCLC 66487836.
- Three clarinet duets: No. 1 in F major, No. 2 in D minor (score), No. 3 in C major
  - Published Leipzig, C. F. Peters, 1821.
  - Other publications:
    - Edition Peters, cat. no. EP 7780.
    - Three progressive clarinet duets, London: Hinrichsen Edition, 1960, score (3 volumes score and 3 parts) OCLC 221151418.
- Concert Trio (Potpourri) for clarinet, horn, and bassoon
  - Edition by Bernhard Päuler. Winterthur: Amadeus, 2005, score (8 pages) and 3 parts OCLC 69664938, 218898550, 150238464; OCLC 427966254, 314684689.
  - Arrangement by Stig Rybrant. Lidingö: Busch, 2007, score (12 pages) and parts OCLC 315794765.
- Divertimento in C major for oboe, two violins, viola and cello, Op. 9
  - Free score at IMSLP.
  - Dates: published Leipzig, C. F. Peters, 1823, cat. no. 1728.
  - Other publications:
    - Edition by Bernhard Päuler. Winterthur: Amadeus, 2003, score (15 pages) and 5 parts OCLC 164935031.

=== Vocal works ===
- Sångstycken ("Songs")
  - Texts by Esaias Tegnér and others
  - Published Stockholm, 1822, 3 volumes. Vol 1 OCLC 187016006.
- Frithiofs saga (10 songs), for voice and piano
  - Texts by Esaias Tegnér
  - Published Stockholm, 1826; enlarged 1827.
  - Other publications:
    - Zwölf Gesänge aus der Frithiof's Saga (Twelve Songs from the Frithiof's Saga), translated from Swedish by Gottlieb Mohnike. Leipzig : C.F. Peters, [1827], score (28 pages) OCLC 35515659.
    - Tolf sånger ur Frithiofs saga, Stockholm: Elkan & Schildknecht, [186-?], score (35 pages) OCLC 16449386.
    - Lund: Gleerup; Copenhagen: Lose & Olsen, no date, score (28 pages) OCLC 473459716.
- "From Ganges' beauteous strands" for voice, clarinet & piano
  - From incidental music to Den lilla slafvinnan (The little bondswoman).
  - Originally for soprano and chamber orchestra.
  - Published Ampleforth, Yorkshire: Emerson Edition, 1980, score (22 pages) and 2 parts OCLC 7818366.
- "Oi terve Pohjola!" for vocal quartet
  - Swedish title: "Hell dig, du höga Nord!" ("Hail, O Northland!")
  - Also arranged for chorus.
  - Probably Crusell's most famous composition in Finland.

=== Music for stage ===
- Lilla slavinnan (The Little Slave Girl), opera in 3 acts
  - Libretto by René Charles Guilbert de Pixérécourt; translated by Ulrik Emanuel Mannerhjerta and G. Lagerbjelke.
  - First performed in Stockholm on 18 February 1824.
  - Excerpts published Stockholm, 1824.
  - Held at Stockholm's Kungliga Teaterns Bibliotek.
  - Other publications:
    - Piano reduction by Ludwig Anton Edvard Passy. Stockholm: Westerberg, [ca. 1825], score (52 pages, "obl. fol.") OCLC 497781417.
    - Libretto, Stockholm, 1824 OCLC 186783678.
    - Motive from "Tusen och en natt". Helsingfors, 1909, score (4 pages) OCLC 58237418.

== Citations and references ==
=== Cited sources ===
- Asiado, Tel (2004). "Bernhard Henrik Crusell (1775–1838). Swedish-Finnish clarinetist, composer and translator." at Mozart Forum.
- Hillila, Ruth-Esther and Barbara Blanchard Hong (1997). Historical dictionary of the music and musicians of Finland. Westport, Conn.: Greenwood Press. ISBN 978-0-313-27728-3.
- Rice, Albert R. (2003). The clarinet in the classical period. Oxford: Oxford University Press. ISBN 978-0-19-514483-3. OCLC 52514349.
- Sadie, Stanley, ed.; John Tyrell; exec. ed. (2001). The new Grove dictionary of music and musicians, 2nd ed. London: Macmillan. ISBN 978-1-56159-239-5 (hardcover). OCLC 419285866 (eBook).
- Winter, Helmer (1925). Berndt Henric Crusellin 150-vuotismuisto [Berndt Henric Crusell's 150th (birthday) anniversary]. Uusikaupunki: the author. OCLC 58221891, 249964610.

== Other sources ==
- Dahlström, Fabian (1976). Bernhard Henrik Crusell : klarinettisten och hans större instrumentalverk / Fabian Dahlström. Skrifter utgivna av Svenska litteratursällskapet i Finland (in Swedish). Helsinki: Society of Swedish Literature in Finland. ISBN 951-9017-21-6. ISSN 0039-6842. Wikidata Q113528513.
- Kallio, Ilmari (1994). Bernhard Henrik Crusell (1775–1838). Uusikaupunki: Crusell-Society. Language: Finnish. OCLC 246856237.
- Spicknall, John Payne (1974). The solo clarinet works of Bernard Henrik Crusell (1775–1838). Thesis—University of Maryland. OCLC 5665626.
- Wilson, Sven (1977). Bernhard Crusell: tonsättare, klarinettvirtuos. Stockholm: Kungliga Musikaliska Akademien (Royal Swedish Academy of Music). Language: Swedish. ISBN 978-91-85428-07-6. OCLC 185869706. Note: Includes extracts from Crusell's diaries of journeys abroad in 1803, 1811 and 1822. OCLC 4882756.
