= CUSO (disambiguation) =

CUSO is an abbreviation with several meanings:

- CUSO Cuso International, originally Canadian University Service Overseas, a Canadian non-profit development organization
- Champaign-Urbana Symphony Orchestra
- Credit union service organization, a type of credit union subsidiary
- CuSO_{4}, Copper(II) sulfate
