= Shirley Brill =

Israeli clarinetist (born 1982)

Shirley Brill שירלי בריל
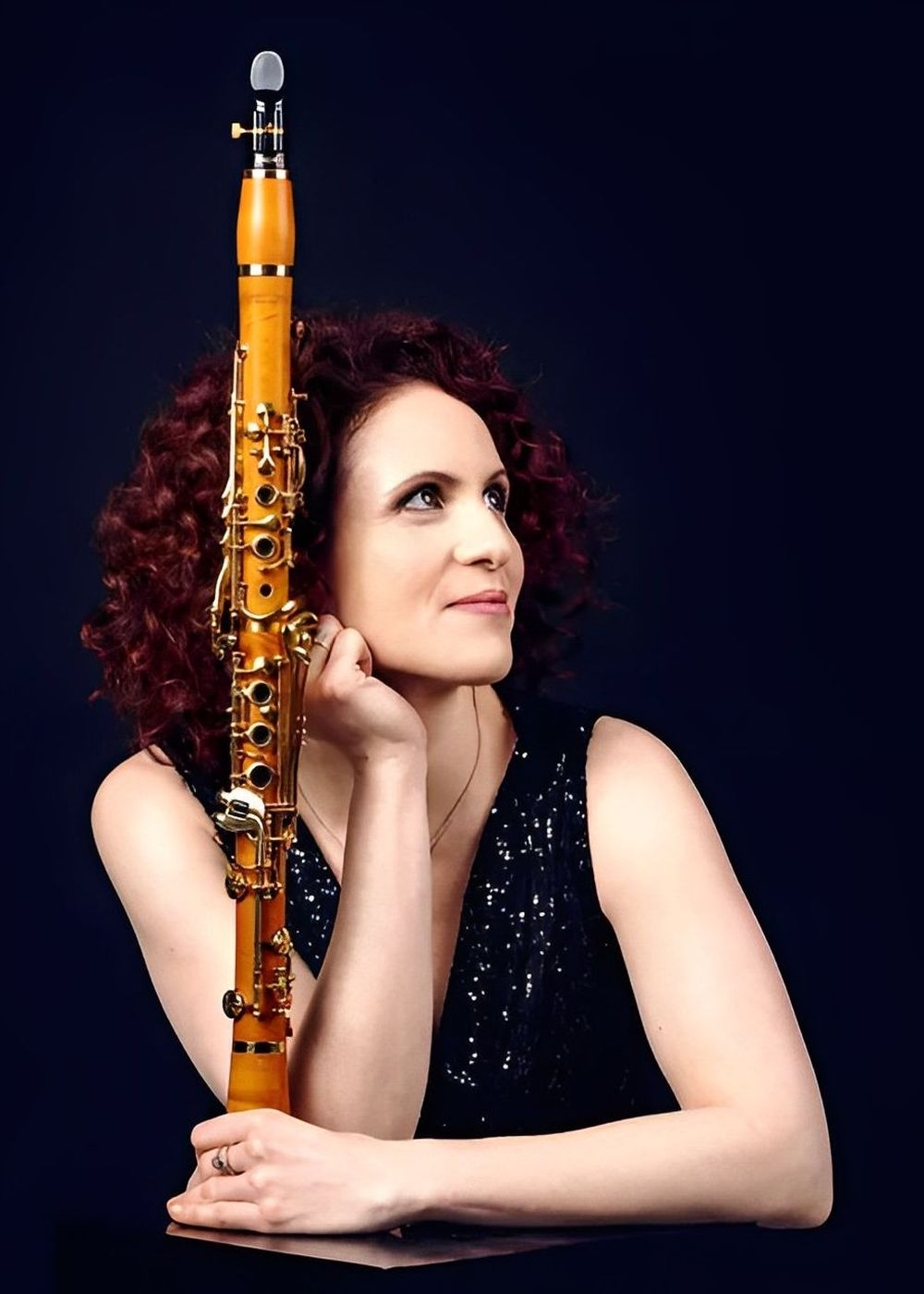

Background information
- Born: 1982 (age 43–44); Petah Tikva, Israel
- Genre: Classical
- Instruments: Clarinet and basset clarinet (Boehm fingering system)
- Years active: 1998–present
- Labels: MHL, Panclassics, Hänssler Classic
- Website: shirleybrill.com
- Teachers while studying: Sabine Meyer, Richard Stoltzman
- Awards: 2003, 2006 and 2007 Discography/Streaming: 5 CDs – YouTube, Spotify, Deezer Agent: Concert agent Andreas Braun, Cologne
- Personal / privat Spouse, children: Jonathan Aner, 3 daughters Residence: Berlin, Germany

Shirley Brill (Hebrew: שירלי בריל; born 1982) is an Israeli clarinetist living in Germany.

== Education and career ==
Born in Petah Tikva, Israel, Brill received her musical education in Israel from Yitzhak Katzap at the Petah Tikva Conservatory. From the year 2000, she continued her studies in Germany with Sabine Meyer at the Musikhochschule Lübeck, as well as in the United States with Richard Stoltzman at the New England Conservatory of Music in Boston.

At the age of 16, she began her solo career with the Israel Philharmonic Orchestra under the direction of Zubin Mehta. Since then she has appeared with a large number of international orchestras, such as the Deutsches Symphonie-Orchester Berlin in the Great Hall of the Berlin Philharmonie, and collaborated with the Hamburg Symphony Orchestra, the Geneva Chamber Orchestra, the Symphony Orchestra of the National Theater of Prague, the Polish Radio Symphony Orchestra, the Munich Symphony Orchestra and the New Philharmonic of Westphalia. Brill has worked with leading conductors such as Daniel Barenboim, Jeffrey Tate and Patrick Lange among others.

She has been invited to international festivals such as the BBC Proms, the Festival of Radio France and Montpellier Languedoc Roussillon, the Schubertiade in Austria, the Festival of Davos (Switzerland), Ljubljana (Slovenia), the Schleswig-Holstein Musik Festival, the Mecklenburg Vorpommern Festival, the Heidelberger Frühling, the Rheingau Musik Festival, and the Spannungen chamber music festival.

Her chamber music partners include Daniel Barenboim, Janine Jansen, Sabine Meyer, Emmanuel Pahud, Tabea Zimmermann, the Fauré Piano Quartet and the Quatuor Terpsycordes.

Since 2009, Brill has been the principal clarinetist of the West–Eastern Divan Orchestra conducted by Daniel Barenboim.

From 2012 Shirley Brill was a guest professor at the Hochschule für Musik "Hanns Eisler" in Berlin and since 2016 a faculty member at the Barenboim–Said Akademie. Since October 2018, Brill has been appointed Professor of Clarinet at the Hochschule für Musik Saar in Saarbrücken, Germany.

== Personal life ==
Brill is married to Jonathan Aner, Israeli pianist, professor of chamber music in Berlin and her partner in the Duo Brillaner. They have 3 daughters, and live in Berlin.

== Instruments ==
Shirley Brill plays on clarinets with French fingering system (Boehm), individually made for her by the manufacturer Schwenk & Seggelke. She has normal clarinets in B♭ and A made of grenadilla, mopane (see the photo) and boxwood and a basset clarinet in A made of boxwood.

== Awards ==
- 2003: Special prize of the ARD International Music Competition
- 2003: 1st Prize for Duo Brillaner at the 40th Possehl Music Competition
- 2006: 2nd Prize International Clarinet Competition Markneukirchen (1st prize not awarded)
- 2007: 2nd Prize Concours de Genève (1st prize not awarded)
- 2010: Shirley Brill, on behalf of the West–Eastern Divan Orchestra founded by Daniel Barenboim, receives the Prize of the Peace of Westphalia.

== Discography ==
2005: Duo Brillaner Debut (at MHL) with Jonathan Aner, including:

- Carl Maria von Weber: Grand Duo Concertant Op. 48;
- Camille Saint-Saëns: Sonata Op. 167;
- Paul Ben-Haim: Pastorale Variée;
- Krysztof Penderecki: 3 Miniatures;
- Francis Poulenc: Sonata

2008: Weber & Baermann (at Pan Classics), with the Terpsycordes Quartet, the Geneva Chamber Orchestra and Patrick Lange, including:

- Carl Maria von Weber: Clarinet Concerto in F minor, Op. 73 No. 1;
- Heinrich Baermann: Quintet for clarinet and strings in E flat major, Op. 23,
- Carl Maria von Weber: Quintet for clarinet and strings in B flat major, Op. 34

2009: Petite Pièce: French Miniatures for Clarinet and Piano (at Pan Classics) with Jonathan Aner, including:

- Gabriel Pierné: Sérénade, Andante con Eleganza, Pièce and Canzonetta
- Eugène Bozza: Fantasie Italienne, Idyll, Aria and Claribel
- Philippe Gaubert: Fantaisie, Romance, Allegretto
- Germaine Tailleferre: Trois Danses de la Nouvelle Cythère (Pavane, Nocturne, Galop) and Arabesque
- Claude Debussy: Petite Pièce and Prèmiere Rhapsodie

2012: Françaix & Prokofiev (at Pan Classics) with the Romanian National Radio Orchestra and Adrian Morar, including:

- Jean Françaix: Concerto for clarinet and orchestra
- Sergei Prokofiev: Sonata Op. 94, (arrangement for clarinet and orchestra by Kent Kennan)
- Jean Françaix: Tema con Variazioni

2017: Brahms & Janáček Sonatas (at hänssler Classic) with Jonathan Aner, including:

- Johannes Brahms, Sonatas for Clarinet and Piano, Op. 120 Nr. 1 and Nr. 2
- Leoš Janáček, Sonata for Clarinet and Piano

The artist is represented on YouTube with audio and video recordings, with audio recordings on Spotify and Deezer.
