= Ellnora Krannert =

Philanthropist

Ellnora Decker Krannert (May 20, 1890 - July 6, 1974) was a philanthropist with a passion for the arts, drama, dance, and music.

Ellnora was born in Noblesville, Indiana to Pheobe Katherine Spencer Decker and Philip Greene. She earned a bachelor's degree in music from Brenau College and was bestowed honorary doctorates in the humanities, law, fine arts, and music from University of Indianapolis, University of Evansville, Indiana University, and Butler University, respectively.

In 1919, she married Herman C. Krannert in Anderson, Indiana. They moved to Indianapolis in 1925 and founded the Inland Container Corporation.

Ellnora and Herman made several transformative gifts to the University of Illinois at Urbana-Champaign, where Herman had earned a mechanical engineering degree. Because of Ellnora's passion for the arts, the couple chose to support projects dedicated to those fields. She was committed to making the Midwest a center of culture and the arts as well as agriculture and industry. She and her husband gave funds to establish Krannert Art Museum, which opened in 1961, and Krannert Center for the Performing Arts, which opened in 1969. Ellnora contributed to the design of the Krannert Center and helped selecting colors, materials, and landscaping designs. Unhappy with having to wait on the street during the intermissions of Broadway performances, she urged architect Max Abramovitz to incorporate a large indoor space where crowd could gather, an aspect of the design that has been characterized as transformative in that the space functionally resembles a piazza or public square rather than a traditional lobby.

Ellnora Guitar Festival, named in her honor, is held biennially at Krannert Center.

Ellnora and Herman also made substantial gifts to hospitals, universities, and museums in Indiana. They established the Robert M. Moore Heart Clinic at Wishard Memorial Hospital in 1952. This became the Krannert Institute of Cardiology, and later the Krannert Cardiovascular Research Center, which is now part of the Indiana University School of Medicine. They also founded the Krannert Foundation and Krannert Charitable Trust. They established the Krannert School of Management and the Krannert Graduate School of Industrial Administration at Purdue University. At the Indianapolis Museum of Art, Krannert Pavilion was named in their honor.
