= Herman C. Krannert =

American philanthropist

- Born: 1887; Chicago, Illinois
- Died: 1972 (aged 84–85)

Herman C. Krannert (1887–1972) was a businessman and philanthropist in the Midwest of the United States who made millions in the corrugated fiber products industry and subsequently made generous contributions to education and the arts. Among other substantial contributions, eleven buildings bear the Krannert name, most of them at hospitals and universities in Illinois and Indiana, including the Krannert School of Management at Purdue University, and the Krannert Art Museum and Krannert Center for the Performing Arts at the University of Illinois Urbana-Champaign.

Krannert was married to Ellnora Decker Krannert.

== Early life ==
Born in 1887, Herman grew up on Chicago's West Side. After graduating from Crane Technical High School, he spent two years saving enough money to attend the University of Illinois Urbana-Champaign, where he was a member of Chi Phi fraternity and received a bachelor of science in mechanical engineering in 1912. Working throughout his college career, he completely financed his education and sent extra money home to support his widowed mother.

== Early career ==
In 1914, Krannert was hired by Sefton Manufacturing Company, a Chicago-based firm that made paper boxes. At age 30, he was transferred to Anderson, Indiana, and became the youngest Sefton employee to be promoted to plant manager. During his years in Anderson, Krannert met and later married Ellnora Decker, an Indiana native and graduate of Brenau College.

Krannert's work at the Anderson plant was rewarded with the company's president offering him a position as a vice president and director, with the caveat that Krannert would be required to vote as the president voted. Feeling that this directive was unprofessional and unethical, he left the company.

== Inland Container Corporation ==
In 1925, Krannert started his own business in Indianapolis, the Inland Container Corporation, with six employees, all of whom had also quit the company in Anderson. The company expanded and survived the Great Depression. During World War II, the United States government began buying large quantities of Inland's moisture-resistant "V-Board" boxes. By the early 1970s, Inland Container was America's second-largest manufacturer of corrugated shipping containers, with a complex of 25 plants grossing $200 million in annual sales.

== Philanthropy ==
In addition to overseeing the company, Krannert was involved in several civic and other business interests. He received an honorary doctor of law degree from the University of Illinois in 1965, in addition to honorary degrees from Indiana, Butler, Purdue, Evansville, and DePauw Universities, and from Indiana Central College. Mrs. Krannert received honorary degrees from Indiana Central College and from Evansville, Butler, and Indiana Universities.

Among other substantial contributions, eleven buildings bear the Krannert name, most of them at hospitals and universities in Illinois and Indiana. Mrs. Krannert's appreciation for the arts largely influenced the Krannerts' contributions to the University of Illinois, and she was influential in the design of the Krannert Center for the Performing Arts. Commenting on this gift to the University, Mr. Krannert said: "We feel that it is a privilege to contribute to my Alma Mater to enlarge and to improve the cultural facilities for future students."

=== Krannert School of Management ===
In 1960, Purdue University began to develop the first relationships with Krannert. He was referred to Emanuel Weiler for advice regarding his Indianapolis-based firm, Inland Container Corporation, and later Krannert approved a management development program for his executives to be taught by Purdue faculty.

In 1962, Herman and Ellnora Krannert donated $2.73 million to Purdue University to establish The Krannert Graduate School of Industrial Administration, the university's first endowed school. The money went to provide for a new building and trust fund.

Herman Krannert received an honorary Doctorate of Industrial Administration from President Hovde, president of Purdue, in 1962.

On February 3, 2023, Purdue’s business school was formally renamed the Mitchell E. Daniels, Jr. School of Business, in honor of Mitch Daniels, the 12th president of Purdue University.

=== Krannert Center for the Performing Arts ===
In 1964, Herman and Ellnora Krannert announced the plans for Krannert Center for the Performing Arts at the University of Illinois in Urbana, Illinois. The Center is known for its four first class venues, including the Foellinger Great Hall, one of the most acoustically perfect performance spaces in the world, and it is also used as a laboratory space, housing classes, offices, and student productions for the University of Illinois Theatre Department, Lyric Theatre @ Illinois, the School of Music, and the Dance Department.

=== Krannert Memorial Library ===
The Krannert Memorial Library, located on the University of Indianapolis campus, opened in 1977 and completely renovated in 2015, to create a 21st-century active learning environment with collaborative space for research, scholarship and engagement. UIndy's Library is a campus destination with access to knowledgeable librarians, information resources and a variety of educational technologies. The Library is open to everyone.
