= Champaign-Urbana Symphony Orchestra =

Orchestra in Champaign-Urbana, Illinois

- Orchestra
- Short name: CUSO
- Former name: Champaign-Urbana Civic Symphony Orchestra
- Founded: 1959
- Location: Champaign-Urbana metropolitan area
- Concert hall: Krannert Center for the Performing Arts
- Principal conductor: Stephen Alltop
- Website: Official website

The Champaign-Urbana Symphony Orchestra (CUSO) is a professional orchestra located in the Champaign-Urbana metropolitan area in central Illinois, United States. The orchestra is the Professional Orchestra in Residence at the Krannert Center for the Performing Arts on the campus of the University of Illinois at Urbana-Champaign. The CUSO is led by music director and conductor Stephen Alltop.

== Founding of the Orchestra ==
In 1959, two school music teachers, Martha Wendt and Gilbert Papp, along with well-known local television weatherman Wyndham Roberts, started the process that eventually led to the formation of (as it was initially called) the Champaign-Urbana Civic Symphony Orchestra. On the academic side of his meteorology career, Roberts was a scientist at the Illinois State Water Survey, and both Wendt, a violinist, and Papp, a clarinetist, were teachers in the Unit 4 (Champaign) school district. These two teachers were American Federation of Musicians members and they, together with Roberts and Dr. Bernard Goodman, on the music faculty at the University of Illinois, were convinced that the orchestra would best succeed if the musicians were paid for both concerts and rehearsals, so fundraising from individuals as well as corporations was made a high priority.

During the spring of 1960, more people were brought into the process, the organization was incorporated with nonprofit status, and it was announced that the board of directors consisted of John Dimond, president; Stanley W. Rahn, secretary; Verrollton C. Shaul, publicity; Donald D. Richmond, attorney; and H. I. Gelvin, Ruth Youngerman, Martha Wendt, Doris Dodds, and Audrey Stewart, members. Also, Wyndham J. Roberts and Gilbert Papp served as vice president and treasurer, respectively. Dates for the first two concerts were announced and the organization applied for membership in the American Symphony Orchestra League.

Meanwhile, Goodman, who joined the faculty at the University of Illinois in 1947 and who was a longtime member of the Walden String Quartet and had conducted the highly respected University of Illinois Symphony Orchestra since 1950, was starting to choose the musicians. By midsummer, Bernard Goodman had accepted the post of conductor; a plan for subscription levels was adopted; a good portion of the first-year $8,500 budget was received or pledged, mostly as relatively large donations; and the beginnings of a Symphony Orchestra Guild had been undertaken, led by Ruth Youngerman. Later in July, a widespread publicity and fundraising effort was launched.

In the early fall, the makeup of the orchestra was settled and the orchestra's first season consisted of two concerts: one on October 20, 1960, with pianist Theodore Lettvin as guest artist, playing Beethoven's "Emperor" Piano Concerto; and an all-Tchaikovsky concert on April 20, 1961, featuring violinist Mischa Mischakoff as soloist in the Tchaikovsky Violin Concerto. The over-sixty-year run (to date) of the orchestra had begun, a success that was enhanced in a May 14, 1969, concert at the end of CUSO's ninth season, when the orchestra moved from Smith Music Hall to the Great Hall of the newly built Krannert Center for the Performing Arts.

== Music Directors ==
Bernard Goodman was music director of the Champaign-Urbana Symphony Orchestra for its first fourteen seasons. In November 1973, he announced his retirement from both the CUSO and the University of Illinois, and continued to direct the orchestra through the 1973–1974 season. In May 1974, it was announced that Paul Vermel, music director of the Portland Symphony Orchestra, would succeed Goodman at the CUSO, and Vermel directed the symphony for the next twenty seasons.

In early 1994, Paul Vermel announced his retirement both as music director of the Champaign-Urbana Symphony Orchestra and as professor at the University of Illinois. He went on to direct the Northwest Symphony Orchestra in suburban Chicago until 2013. He continued as Director Emeritus there, and the Northwest Symphony Orchestra is continuing both the Paul Vermel Young Artist Award program and the Paul Vermel Conductor Apprenticeship Program.

In June 1994, the CUSO announced that two concerts during the 1994–1995 season would be conducted by Vermel, with the other four concerts conducted by outside guest conductors, each with specific strengths:

- a September concert conducted by Kenneth Kiesler, director of the Illinois Symphony Orchestra, which performs in Springfield and Bloomington, Illinois
- an October concert conducted by Catherine Comet, director of the Grand Rapids Symphony
- a January 1995 pops concert conducted by John Covelli, director of the Binghamton, New York Symphony and the Greater Palm Beach Symphony
- an April concert conducted by Michael Charry, which included an avant-garde work by Donald Erb.

At the end of that season, the CUSO Board had reached no decision about a new director and only three subscription concerts were scheduled for the 1995–1996 season, conducted by two University of Illinois professors, Ian Hobson and Chester Alwes. Paul Vermel conducted a scheduled benefit concert, and a systematic strategy of cost cutting and fundraising was undertaken. The director search was reopened and in April 1996, Steven Larsen was named as the new director.

From 1996 to 2012, Steven Larsen was music director of both the Rockford Symphony Orchestra and the Champaign-Urbana Symphony Orchestra. In 2011, he indicated that he wanted to reduce his workload, and intended to direct just the Rockford Symphony Orchestra after the 2011–2012 season. Therefore, during 2011, a music director/conductor search committee was formed, comprising both CUSO Board members and CUSO musicians. From 17 applications received, the committee selected four finalists and, in the spring of 2012, the CUSO Board announced that the 2012–2013 season would serve as a search year, with five guest conductors, four of whom would be candidates for the director's post:

- Farkhad Khudyev of Berkeley Heights, New Jersey, artistic director and conductor of the New Jersey Intergenerational Orchestra (October 13, 2012)
- David Commanday of Peoria, Illinois, artistic director and conductor of the Heartland Festival Orchestra (January 18, 2013)
- Alexander Platt of Chicago, Illinois, music director of the Marion Philharmonic Orchestra and the Wisconsin Philharmonic (Waukesha), and principal conductor of the Chicago Opera Theater (February 10, 2013)
- Stephen Alltop of Evanston, Illinois, music director and conductor of the Elmhurst Symphony Orchestra and the Apollo Chorus of Chicago (March 9, 2013).

In late March 2013, the board announced that Stephen Alltop would become the fourth director of the orchestra.

== About the Orchestra ==
The CUSO is an orchestra that performs five to six subscription concerts and three to four Youth Concerts each season. The CUSO reaches more than 45,000 people each year through live performance and concert broadcasts. Throughout its history, the CUSO has established a number of musical landmarks, including the performances of commissioned works and the showcasing of internationally acclaimed guest artists. The opening concert of the 1991–1992 concert season, "Celebration!" featured only music that was composed and performed by African-Americans. A historic event, this performance was heard nationally over American Public Radio's "Performance Today" and was honored with an American Society of Composers, Authors and Publishers (ASCAP) Award for Adventurous Programming. The CUSO continues its long-standing tradition of collaboration with the University of Illinois Oratorio Society in the presentation of major choral works.

== Community Outreach ==
One of the Champaign-Urbana Symphony Orchestra's main goals is to provide high-quality music education for the youth of the Champaign-Urbana metropolitan area. Each year, the CUSO reaches approximately 15,000 youths through its Youth Concerts, In-School Concerts, and events such as the Instrument Petting Zoo.

== Personnel ==
In addition to the approximately 65 contracted players and the music director, the CUSO employs five administrative staff members: an executive director, development director, operations manager, office administrator, and music librarian. The orchestra also employs many area musicians as substitute or extra musicians on an as-needed basis.

== Symphony Guild ==
Formed in 1962, the Champaign-Urbana Symphony Orchestra Guild serves in a fundraising and support capacity to the CUSO. The guild is the primary source of funding for the CUSO's educational programs.

== 2026–2027 Season ==
The 2026–2027 season will consist of five concerts:

- October 10, 2026: Mahler's Third Symphony
- November 14, 2026: CUSO Baroque Concert: All in the Family
- December 9, 2026: Holiday Magic
- March 6, 2027: Carmina Burana
- April 24, 2027: Shostakovich Symphony No. 5
