= Taira Kaneko =

Japanese clarinetist (born 1984)

- Born: 1984 (age 41–42); Tokorozawa, Saitama
- Genres: Classical
- Occupation: Musician
- Instrument: Clarinet
- Member of: Yomiuri Nippon Symphony Orchestra
- Formerly of: Lübeck Philharmonic Orchestra

Taira Kaneko (金子 平, Kaneko Taira; born 1984) is a Japanese clarinetist.

== Career ==
Kaneko studied at Tokyo University of the Arts and Musikhochschule Lübeck. His teachers were Yuichi Handa, Masaharu Yamamoto, Yuji Murai, and Sabine Meyer. He won first prize in the young artist division at the Young Japanese Clarinetist Competition in 2001, first prize at the Japan Music Competition in 2006, first prize at the Mozart-Gesellschaft Wiesbaden, and third prize at the ARD International Music Competition in 2008.

He played in the Lübeck Philharmonic Orchestra from 2009 to 2012. He also performed with Bavarian Radio Symphony Orchestra, Munich Chamber Orchestra and Tokyo Philharmonic Orchestra.

He is the principal clarinet of the Yomiuri Nippon Symphony Orchestra.
