= Graham Sheen =

Graham Sheen AGSM (born 1952) is a British bassoonist, teacher, composer and arranger. He is principal bassoonist of both the BBC Symphony Orchestra (since 1983) and the Academy of St Martin in the Fields (since 1976). From 1979 he has been professor of bassoon at the Guildhall School of Music and Drama, where he also teaches chamber music, orchestral repertoire and bassoon ensemble. His published works include solo works for bassoon, chamber music for both winds and strings and three song cycles. He has made numerous arrangements for wind ensemble, and three volumes of graded pieces for the bassoon are published by Faber Music. He has recently recorded two solo albums for SFZ music.
