= Sabine Meyer =

German clarinetist (born 1959)

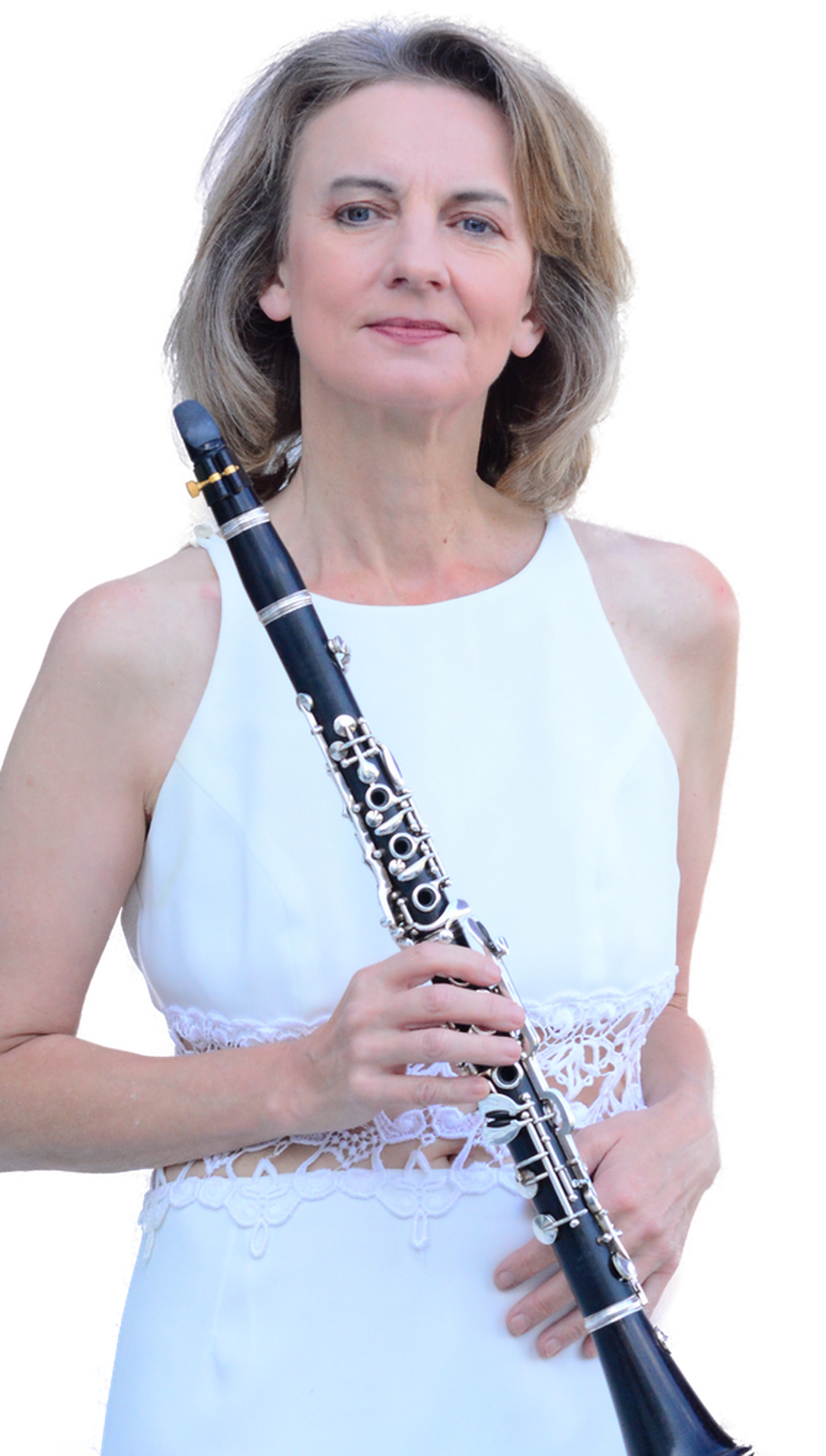
- Meyer in 2019
- Born: March 30, 1959 (age 67); Crailsheim, Germany
- Occupations: Classical clarinetist; Academic teacher
- Years active: 1983–2025
- Organizations: Berlin Philharmonic; Bavarian Radio Symphony Orchestra; Bläserensemble Sabine Meyer; Musikhochschule Lübeck
- Spouse: Reiner Wehle
- Children: 2
- Awards: ECHO Klassik; Order of Merit of the Federal Republic of Germany; Order of Merit of Baden-Württemberg
- Website: www.sabine-meyer.com

Sabine Meyer (born 30 March 1959) is a German classical clarinetist. She ended her career with a final chamber music performance on 15 December 2025 in Bern.

== Biography ==
Born in Crailsheim, Baden-Württemberg, Meyer began playing the clarinet at an early age. Her first teacher was her father, also a clarinetist. She studied with Otto Hermann in Stuttgart and then with Hans Deinzer at the Hochschule für Musik und Theater Hannover, along with her brother, clarinetist Wolfgang Meyer, and husband, clarinetist Reiner Wehle, who played later in the Munich Philharmonic. She began her career as a member of the Bavarian Radio Symphony Orchestra and the Berlin Philharmonic, where her appointment as one of the orchestra's first female members caused controversy. Herbert von Karajan, the orchestra's music director, hired Meyer in September 1982, but the players voted against her at the conclusion of her probation period by a vote of 73 to 4. The orchestra insisted the reason was that her tone did not blend with the other members of the section, but some observers, including Karajan, believed that the true reason was her gender. In 1983, after nine months, Meyer left the orchestra to become a full-time solo clarinetist.

In addition to her work as a soloist, and a band member in general, Sabine Meyer is a committed player of chamber music and plays all styles of classical music. She was a member of the Trio di Clarone along with her brother and her husband who have recorded many CDs. Meyer and her wind quintet have worked as members of the Lucerne Festival Orchestra with Claudio Abbado.

As a soloist, Meyer has appeared with more than 300 orchestras internationally, including the Vienna Philharmonic, Chicago Symphony Orchestra, London Philharmonic Orchestra, NHK Symphony Orchestra, Berlin Philharmonic, and the radio symphony orchestras of Vienna, Basel, Warsaw, Prague and Budapest. Her collaborators included conductors Claudio Abbado, Herbert Blomstedt, Hans Vonk, Kenneth Sillito, Franz Welser-Möst, Nicolò Umberto Foron and Nayden Todorov among others.

By the 1990s, Meyer had become a prominent solo clarinetist, recording regularly and exclusively for the EMI label. These EMI recordings include a CD of French music for Clarinet and Piano with Oleg Maisenberg, entitled French Recital. A disc of clarinet concertos by Ludwig Spohr and Franz Krommer was released in July 2007, for which she collaborated with her student Julian Bliss.

From 1993 to the winter semester 2019/2020 she shared with her husband a professorship at Musikhochschule Lübeck, in Schleswig-Holstein. Her husband's successor is his former student Jens Thoben. She was professor until October 2022.

Her clarinet students have also included Shirley Brill, Annelien Van Wauwe, Sebastian Manz, Taira Kaneko, and Han Kim.

== Instruments ==
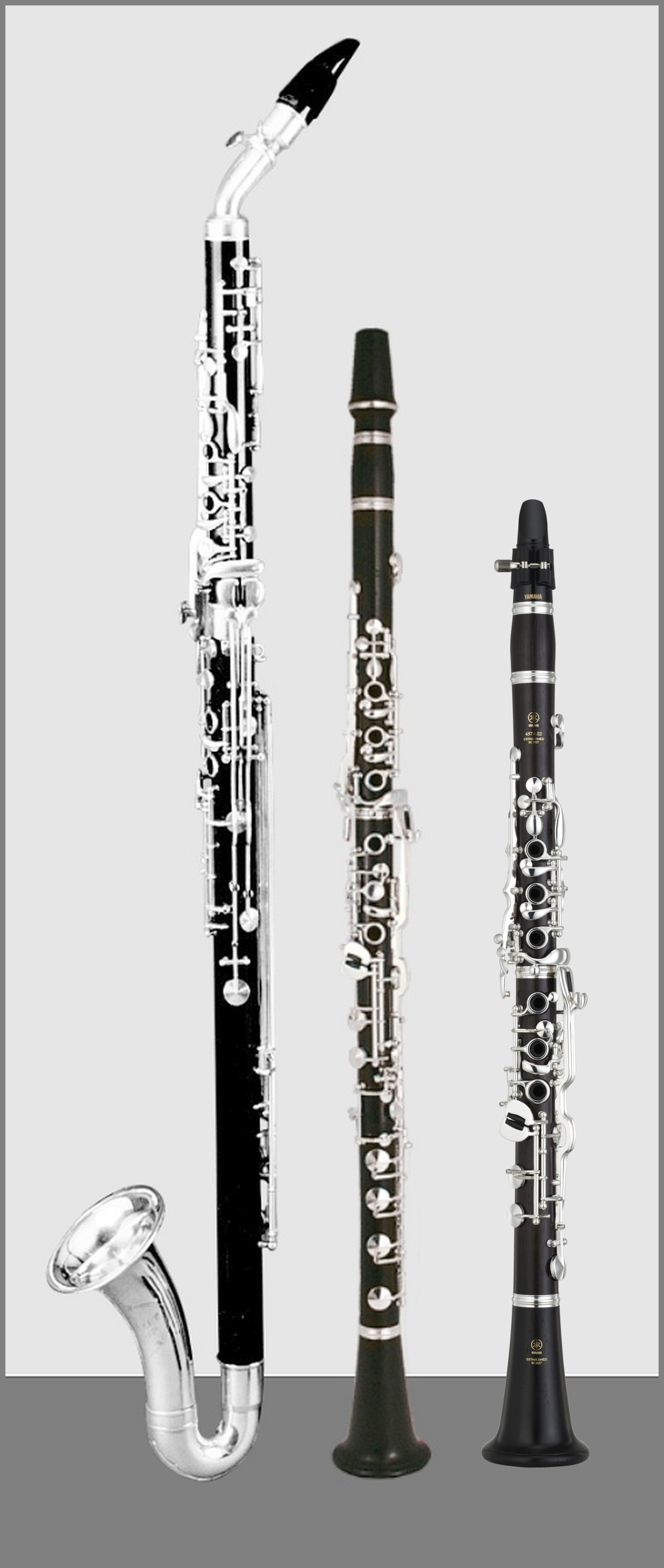
Basset horn, basset clarinet and standard clarinet

Sabine Meyer plays the clarinet and basset clarinet in B♭ and A, as well as a basset horn in F, all made of grenadilla by Herbert Wurlitzer, and clarinets in B♭ and in A made of boxwood, manufactured by Schwenk & Seggelke (now: Seggelke Klarinetten), which she mainly uses in chamber music. In 1984, Meyer commissioned Wurlitzer to build a basset clarinet (in A) for her, not a historical replica but a modern, hitherto only occasionally, built instrument. Since then, she has been playing the clarinet concerto by Mozart (and his clarinet quintet) in a reconstructed version.

== Retirement ==
Meyer chose to retire from the concert stage at the age of 66, citing the physical demands of playing the clarinet at the highest level as well as her wish to step back from the pressures of an intensive concert schedule after many decades. Her farewell concerts focused primarily on chamber music. On 4 December 2025, she performed in Berlin with the Armida Quartet in Brahms's Clarinet Quintet in B minor, Op. 115. Her final public concert took place on 15 December 2025 in Bern, featuring a Christmas programme performed together with the Alliage Saxophone Quintet.

== Awards ==
- 1996 Niedersachsenpreis for culture
- 1997 Member of the Free Academy of the Arts Hamburg
- 2001 Brahms Prize by the Brahms Society Schleswig-Holstein
- 2004 Art Award of the Federal State of Schleswig-Holstein
- 2008 French order Chevalier des Arts et des Lettres
- 2010 Order of Merit of Baden-Württemberg
- 2013 Officer's Cross of the Order of Merit of the Federal Republic of Germany
- various ECHO Klassik Prize, eight-time winner

== Selected recordings ==
- 1983: Mozart: Clarinet Quintet in A major K.V. 581, with the Philharmonia Quartet Berlin, Denon PSM 38C37-7038
- 1985–1986: Weber: Clarinet Concerto No. 1, Clarinet Concerto No. 2, Concertino, with Herbert Blomstedt and Staatskapelle Dresden, and Clarinet Quintet, with Jörg Faerber and Württembergisches Kammerorchester Heilbronn, EMI Classics 7243 5 67989 2 2.
- 1988: Mozart: Clarinet Quintet, with Wiener Streichsextett, EMI Classics 7243 5 67648 2 8.
- 1990: Mozart: Clarinet Concerto, Sinfonia concertante in E-flat K. 297b, with Hans Vonk and Staatskapelle Dresden, EMI Classics 7243 5 66949 2 7.
- 1995: Carl Stamitz: Clarinet Concerto No. 1, Clarinet Concerto No. 7, Concerto for basset horn, Concerto for Clarinet and Bassoon, with Sergio Azzolini (Bassoon) and Iona Brown and Academy of St Martin in the Fields, EMI Classics 7243 5 55511 2 2.
- 1996: A Night at the Opera, with Franz Welser-Möst and Orchester der Oper Zürich, EMI Classics 7243 5 56137 2 1.
- 1999: Mozart: Clarinet Concerto, Debussy Premiere Rapsodie, Takemitsu Fantasma/Cantos, with Claudio Abbado and Berlin Philharmonic, EMI Classics 7243 5 56832 2 9.
- 1999: Brahms: Clarinet Quintet, with Alban Berg Quartett, EMI Classics 7243 5 56759 2 7.
- 2007: Saint-Saëns: Clarinet Sonata, Poulenc: Clarinet Sonata, Devienne: Clarinet Sonata No. 1, Milhaud: Scaramouche, with Oleg Maisenberg, EMI Classics 0946 3 79787 2 6.
- 2007: Franz Krommer: Concerto for two clarinets, with Julian Bliss, Spohr: Clarinet Concerto No. 4, (Clarinet) and Kenneth Sillito and Academy of St Martin in the Fields, EMI Classics 0946 3 79786 2 7.
- 2007: Nielsen Clarinet Concerto, Wind Quintet, with Simon Rattle and Berlin Philharmonic, EMI Classics 0946 3 94421 2 6.
