= Howard Klug =

American musician

Howard Klug is an American clarinetist and university professor.

== Performance career ==
Howard Klug has been a chamber musician, soloist, and clinician throughout the United States, Great Britain, Belgium, Portugal, Austria, Venezuela, China and Israel. A former member of the U.S. Air Force Band in Washington, D.C., where he soloed on flute, clarinet and saxophone, Klug has also been principal clarinet of the Fresno Philharmonic, Bear Valley Festival Orchestra, Sinfonia da Camera and the Indianapolis Chamber Orchestra. He has also been a member of the Columbus Symphony Orchestra and the Grant Park Symphony. Chamber music affiliations have included the Illinois Trio, the Illinois Woodwind Quintet, the Chicago Ensemble and Trio Indiana. Mr. Klug's recent concerto performances have included appearances with the Belgian Radio Orchestra, the Columbus Symphony Orchestra and a tour of Belgium with the Kamerorkest of the Staatsacademie of Vilnius.

== Teaching career ==
Howard Klug is Professor of Clarinet at Indiana University Jacobs School of Music, Bloomington. Some of his recent pedagogical activities, in addition to annual master classes at many of the world's finest music academies, have been as the artistic director of the Belgian Clarinet Academy, a Fulbright scholar in Iceland, a clinician at the Mid-West International Band and Orchestra Clinic and the creator of the publishing company "Woodwindiana", dedicated to new literature for young clarinetists.
