= Sinfonia da Camera =

Chamber orchestra in Illinois

- Chamber orchestra
- Founded: 1984
- Location: Champaign-Urbana, Illinois
- Concert hall: Krannert Center for the Performing Arts
- Music director: Ian Hobson

Sinfonia da Camera is a professional chamber orchestra in Central Illinois. It was founded in 1984 by Ian Hobson, a noted pianist who in 1981 was awarded the First Prize in the Leeds International Piano Competition. The orchestra is composed of musicians throughout the Midwest and brings music to audiences in Central Illinois and elsewhere. In addition to performing the standard repertoire from baroque to modern music, Ian Hobson and Sinfonia da Camera frequently present compositions by composers that are performed less often and a world premiere by a contemporary composer or a newly made orchestration of an earlier work.

== History ==
The orchestra was formed in September 1984 and performed two concerts that season in the Great Hall of the Krannert Center at the University of Illinois and at Lake Land College in Mattoon. During succeeding years the number of concerts increased, and has included either six or seven concerts at Krannert Center each year starting with the 1989–1990 season.

Fifteen recordings are listed by ArkivMusic for Sinfonia da Camera. A live recording of Sinfonia da Camera's October 6, 2014, concert featuring music by Pulitzer-Prize winner George Walker was released on Albany Records in 2016. The four volumes of the Ignaz Moscheles cycle were released in 1999, 2001, 2004 and 2012. Each volume was positively reviewed in American Record Guide, for example, volume 2 and volume 3. In 2011 the Albany label released a Sinfonia recording of another American composer, William Schuman, during his centenary year.

== Selected season performances ==
2000-2001 Season

- The first concert of the season included the world première of Graham Whettam’s Concerto Drammatico with cellist Martin Rummel.
- Special guest artists also included Paul Merkelo (trumpet) and Nathan Gunn (baritone).
- Haydn’s Creation was performed with the University of Illinois Chorale and Oratorio Society.
- A season-closing European tour included two London concerts, one featuring baritone Nathan Gunn singing Delius and Scheer songs and one with marimbist William Moersch performing the UK premiere of Bennett's Marimba Concerto.
- A recording of Ignaz Moscheles' Piano Concertos, Vol. II was released.

2001-2002 Season

- Guest artists included pianist Jonathan Faiman, who performed the world première of his piano concerto Conversations with Piano and Orchestra, and violinist Andrés Cárdenes.
- The University of Illinois Chorale and Oratorio Society joined Sinfonia to perform Bach’s St. John Passion.
- Sinfonia presented a concert at the University of South Carolina's Koger Center for the Arts.

2005-2006 Season

- American première of George Enescu’s opera Oedipe featuring Stefan Ignat as soloist in his American debut.
- World première, featuring guitarist James Buckland, of his reconstruction of a long-lost version for "full orchestra and terz guitar" of Mauro Giuliani’s Second Guitar Concerto, Op. 36.

2006-2007 Season

- Guest artists included Chu-Fang Huang (piano), winner of the 2005 Cleveland International Piano Competition, and Graeme Jennings (violin).
- Two world premières were performed by Sinfonia da Camera: Ianus for chamber ensemble and computer-generated sounds by Sever Tipei and Still for Violin (Graeme Jennings), Viola (Masumi Per Rostad) and Chamber Orchestra by Keeril Makan.
- The Marriage of Figaro commemorated the 250th birth year of Mozart.
- Sinfonia took a two-week tour to China (Beijing and Shanghai).

2007-2008 Season

- Sinfonia performed the world première of Roberto Sierra’s Variations on a Souvenir, a work commissioned by the Krannert Center for the Performing Arts and the Carlsen Center in Overland Park, Kansas. This concert also featured James Carter in Sierra's Concerto for Saxophones and Orchestra.
- Sinfonia also premièred the orchestration, by T. Grigoriu, of George Enescu’s Impressions from Childhood featuring Sherban Lupu.

2008-2009 Season

- Sinfonia performed the six Brandenburg Concertos.
- Sinfonia performed Edward Elgar's Serenade in E minor, Walton's Viola Concerto and Vaughan Williams' Symphony No. 5 in D Major.
- Sinfonia performed the world premiere of Stephen Andrew Taylor's The Machine Awakes, based on the novel Galatea 2.2 by Richard Powers, with soprano soloist Amy van Roekel, Schubert's Symphony No. 8 in B minor (the Unfinished), and Mozart's Piano Concerto No. 17 with Menahem Pressler as soloist.

2015-2016 Season

- A Beethoven-centered concert included Beethoven's The Creatures of Prometheus and the world premiere of "The Letter," a setting by Robert Chumbley of Beethoven's Immortal Beloved letter, sung by Ricardo Herrera.
- Vienna's Webern Kammerchor and the University of Illinois Chamber Singers joined the orchestra to perform Schubert's Mass in E flat major.
- Csaba Erdélyi performed his completion of Bartók's Viola Concerto.

2016-2017 Season

- American Century concert with Leonard Bernstein’s Candide Overture, Barber’s Knoxville, Summer of 1915, David DeBoor Canfield's Rhapsody after Gershwin, written for the violinist Rachel Patrick, in a US premiere performance. Followed by Gershwin’s Porgy and Bess: a Symphonic Picture and finally Sousa’s Stars and Stripes Forever.
- Mendelssohn’s Elijah – Oratorio on Words of the Old Testament, with the Oratorio Society and nine soloists.
- Final concert with Stravinsky’s Pulchinella Suite, Glazunov’s Violin Concerto, and Rimsky-Korsakov’s symphonic poem, Scheherazade. Violin soloist for the Glazunov and Rimsky-Korsakov was Andrés Cárdenes, former concertmaster of the Pittsburgh Symphony.

== About the Orchestra ==
In addition to the approximately fifty contracted players and the Music Director, Sinfonia da Camera employs area musicians on an as-needed basis. The orchestra typically performs six subscription concerts each season and has recorded twelve concerts. Recordings of recent concerts are broadcast on "Prairie Performances" on select Fridays by WILL-FM Radio.
