= Krannert Art Museum =

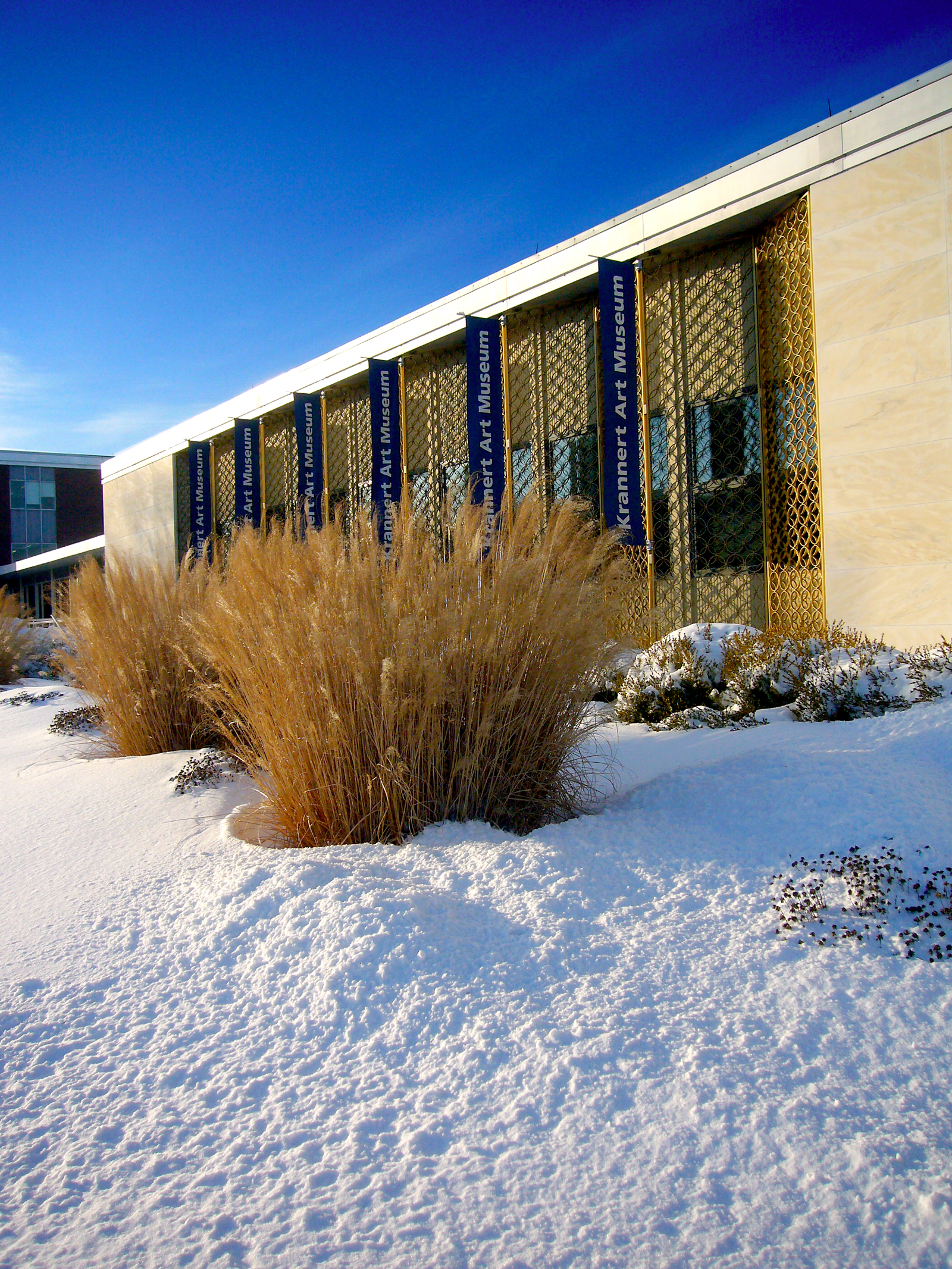
- Established: 1961
- Location: 500 East Peabody Drive; Champaign, Illinois
- Coordinates: 40.101973°N 88.231373°W
- Type: Art museum
- Collection size: 11,000 objects
- Architect: Ambrose Richardson
- Public transit access: MTD
- Website: kam.illinois.edu

The Krannert Art Museum is a fine art museum located at the University of Illinois Urbana-Champaign in Champaign, Illinois, United States. It has 48,000 square feet (4,500 m^{2}) of space devoted to all periods of art, dating from ancient Egypt to contemporary photography. The museum's collection of more than 11,500 objects can be accessed online and includes specializations in 20th-century art, Asian art, and pre-Columbian art, particularly works from the Andes.

In addition to collection galleries, the museum features six to 10 special exhibitions each year from national and international museum collections as well as exhibitions of art by contemporary artists, faculty and graduate and undergraduate students .

== History ==
The museum was designed by architect Ambrose Richardson and opened in 1961.

An addition to the museum was completed in 1988. This addition, the Kinkead Pavilion, was the creation of Larry Booth and Associates. The building incorporates contemporary Egyptian art decorative elements in an overall post-modernist design. The museum is named for benefactors Herman C. Krannert and his wife Ellnora Krannert in recognition of Ellnora's interest in the arts. With over 132,000 visitors annually, the museum supports scholarship through the Fred and Donna Giertz Education Center.

In 2012, the Krannert Art Museum opened a newly redesigned gallery of African art entitled Encounters: The Arts of Africa. A renovation of additional main floor galleries was completed in 2017. In 2019, the museum opened Art Since 1948, a long-term collections installation focused on the museum's permanent collection of modern and contemporary art.

The museum's current director, Stephanie Smith, began her tenure in 2026.

== Collections ==
Major collections of the museum include the Trees Collection of European and American Painting, Harlan E. and Theresa E. Moore Gallery of Decorative Arts, the Olsen Collection of Ancient Andean art, Encounters: The Arts of Africa, Art Since 1948.

The museum is part of the College of Fine and Applied Arts.

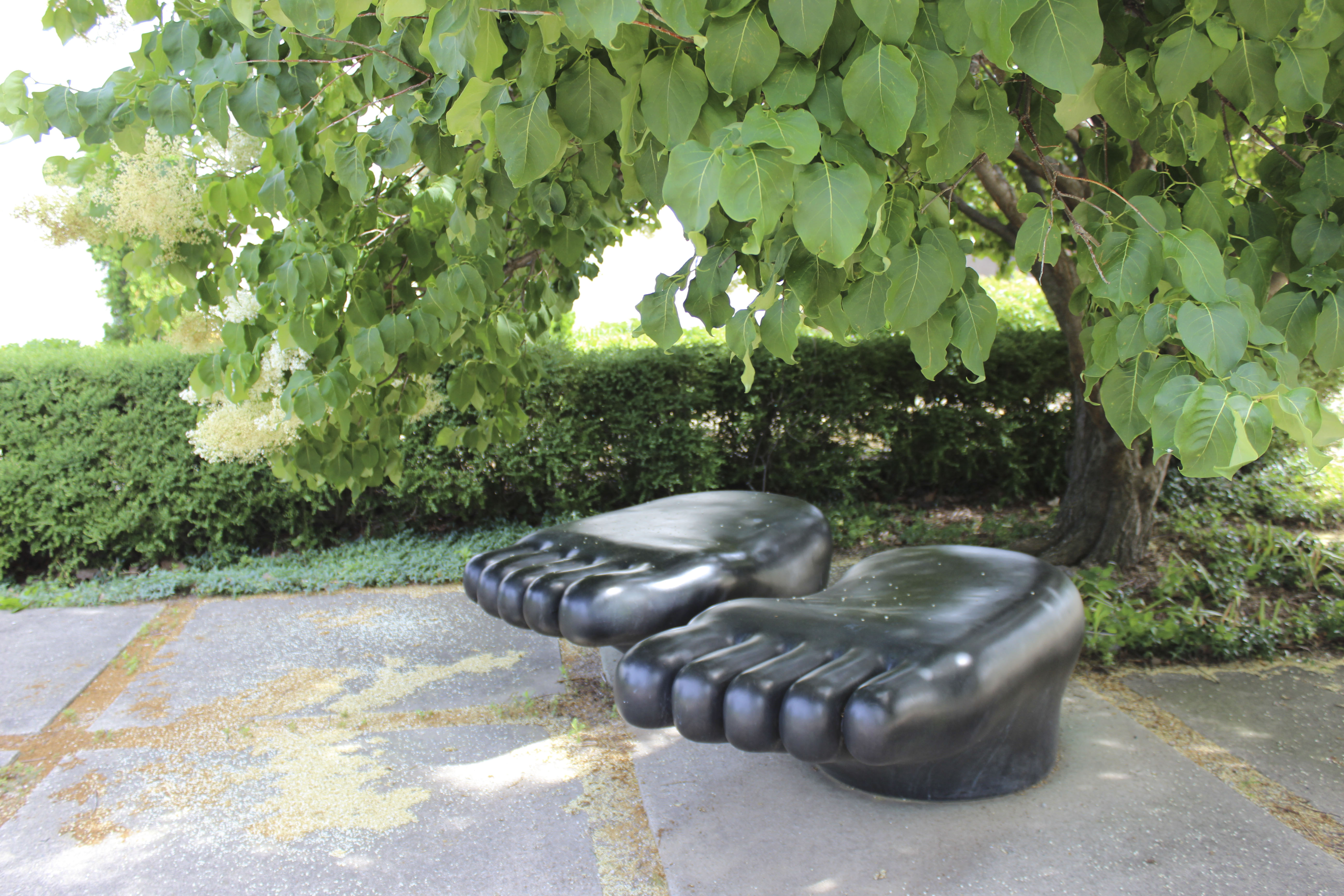
Sculpture by Tom Otterness at the Krannert Art Museum

== See also ==
- Champaign County Museums Network
