= Krannert Center for the Performing Arts =

Performing arts complex in Illinois, US

Coordinates: 40°06′28″N 88°13′22″W

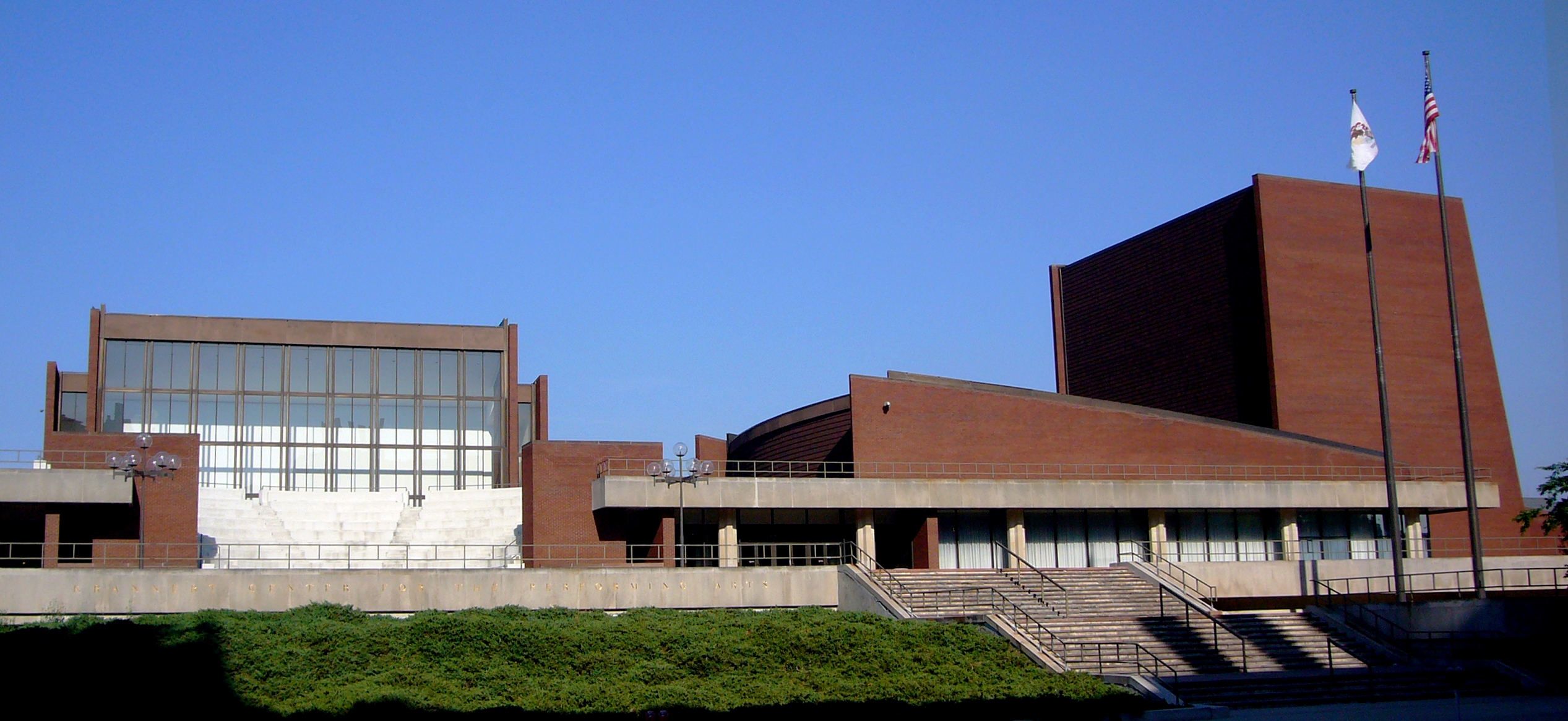
Part of the west facade of the Krannert Center; the amphitheatre is on the left in front of the Foelinger Great Hall lobby windows, with the Festival theater on the right. The Playhouse Theater is not shown.

The Krannert Center for the Performing Arts is an educational and performing arts complex located at 500 South Goodwin Avenue in Urbana, Illinois and on the campus of the University of Illinois Urbana-Champaign. Herman C. Krannert, an industrialist who founded Inland Container Corporation and an alumnus of the university, and his wife, Ellnora Krannert, made a gift of $16 million that led to the Krannert Center's construction. Max Abramovitz, the architect who designed the facility, was also an Illinois alumnus.

The center, often abbreviated as "KCPA," contains four venues with a combined seating capacity of about 4,000. The expansive main lobby features a floor made of teak from Thailand, which cost $1 million, and walls clad in marble from Carrara, Italy. The building opened in 1969.

== Performance facilities ==
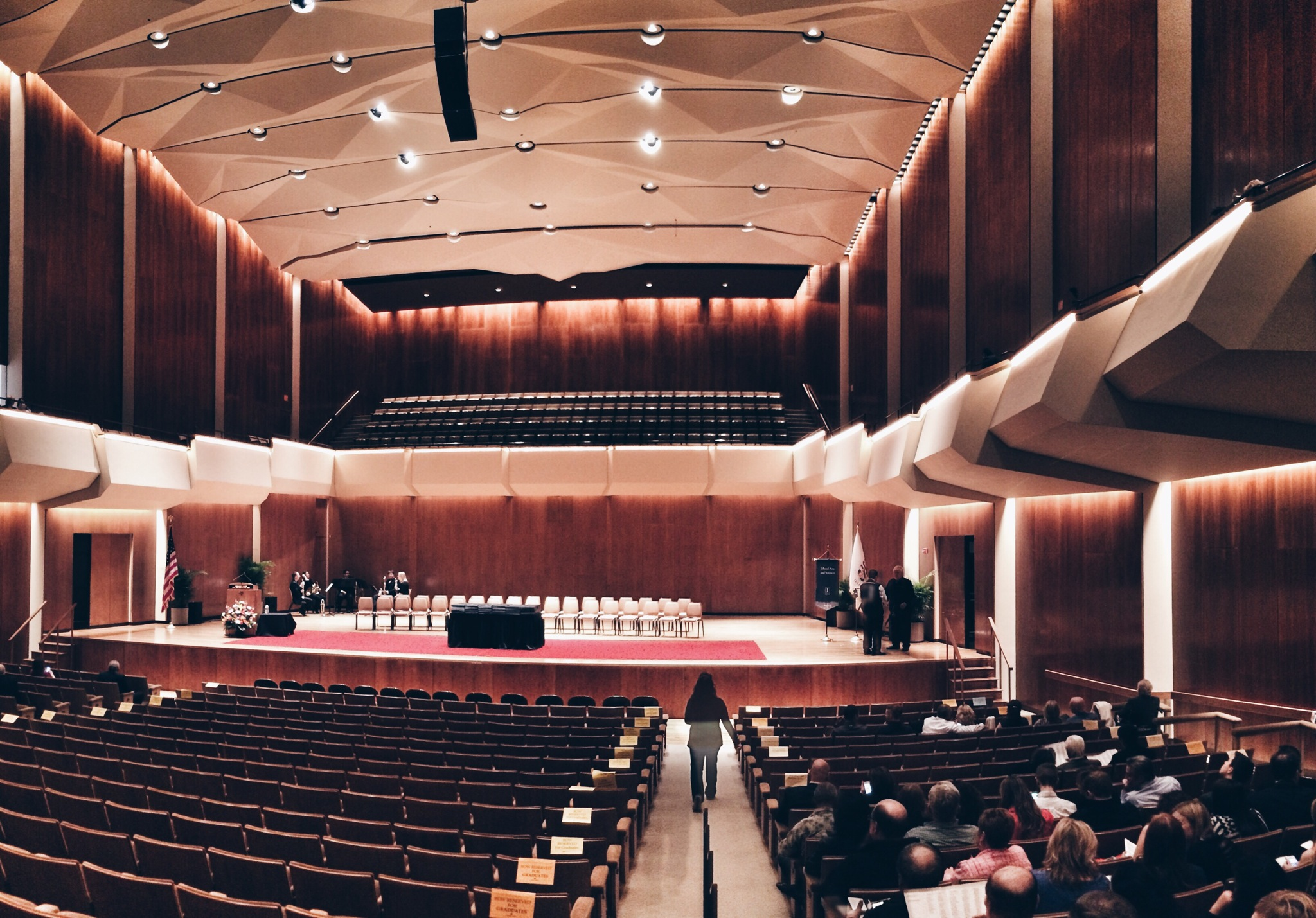
An interior view of Foellinger Great Hall

- Foellinger Great Hall, with 2,078 seats, is the largest of the venues at the center and is known for its acoustics; it attracts world famous artists and ensembles to perform every year. Some noteworthy orchestras like the Chicago Symphony Orchestra and the Sydney Symphony have used the hall for recordings. The School of Music at the University of Illinois hosts many performances in this venue by students, faculty, the Sinfonia da Camera and the University of Illinois Wind Symphony. It is the main venue for the Champaign-Urbana Symphony Orchestra, the Professional Orchestra in Residence at the Krannert Center and the Sinfonia da Camera conducted by Ian Hobson.

Dr. Cyril Harris, a noted acoustician and Emeritus Professor of Architecture at Columbia University designed the interior of the Foellinger Great Hall. His past projects include the Metropolitan Opera House in New York City and Powell Symphony Hall in St. Louis. Later projects include the mid-1970s renovation of Avery Fisher Hall at Lincoln Center and the late-1990s design of Benaroya Hall in Seattle. The design of the hall is almost perfectly symmetrical. There are no parallel surfaces in the room, instead all the surfaces are angled to ensure that the sound reflects back to the audience. This accounts for much of the hall's acoustic superiority. No amplification is necessary for instrumental music.

- Tryon Festival Theatre, with 974 seats on two levels, was primarily intended for operas and the acoustics are designed to favor vocal performances. It also hosts performances of ballet, dances, musicals and plays. This theater is equipped with a Sennheiser Audio System, computerized lighting control, sound reinforcement and recording capability. It has become a tradition for the local Champaign-Urbana Ballet to perform The Nutcracker in the Festival theatre every December. A unique feature of the theatre, designed to support the plays and musicals, is that a trap door may be placed almost anywhere on stage with removable 4'x 8' panels.
- Colwell Playhouse, with 674 seats, mainly hosts plays and dance performances and is used mainly by the Departments of Theatre and Dance and also by touring productions. Like the Festival theatre, it is equipped with a Sennheiser Audio System, a computerized lighting system, sound reinforcement and recording capability. The acoustics in this venue are designed to specifically support speech performances. The walls are shaped to reflect voices from the stage towards the audience while the back walls are echo-proof.
- Studio Theatre, a small theatre with 200 seats, is a black box theatre designed to support experimental performances. It was intended as an experimental workspace for students and performers and hence has a smaller, less intimidating seating capacity. Its audio and lighting capabilities are similar to the other venues with a computerized lighting system and sound reinforcement.
- Amphitheatre; this theater is located on the outside of the Krannert Center and is a common spot for students to relax, study, and socialize during the warmer months. It is a popular on-campus first date destination and was voted "Best Spot to Share A First Kiss" by the student population in 2006. It was the location of On The Rocks, a set of student written, produced, and directed one-act plays put on by the Krannert Center Student Association in the spring.

== Other public facilities ==
- Stage 5 Bar; this bar and performance stage is located in the central lobby of the Krannert center. It is used for a variety of purposes including simple patron lounging, meetings, course events and small performances like Afterglow concerts, Traffic Jam events and Interval concerts. It is also home to Krannert Uncorked. Krannert Uncorked is a wine tasting event, for those of age, on Thursdays. Stage 5 Bar also serves cocktails, imported beers and hors d'oeuvres 90 minutes before most performances until performances end for the evening.
- Intermezzo Cafe, located on the north end of the lobby between Colwell Playhouse and the Studio Theatre, provides full meals, snacks, and refreshments throughout the day and before/after performances all week. The cafe is certified by the Illinois Green Business Association, and all proceeds go back into Krannert Center events. They use many locally produced products, as well as offering organic and vegetarian selections.

== Non-public facilities ==
The production level (floor 2) of the facility offers a full scenery construction shop, costume shop, and dedicated rehearsal spaces for choral, orchestra, and dance performers, plus a drama rehearsal room which is the same size as the stages in the Playhouse and Festival theaters. There are over 40,000 costume pieces, and tens of thousands of props in various storerooms. The Great Hall, Festival and Playhouse each have dedicated dressing and makeup rooms for performers adjacent to the stage entrances.

== Design and construction considerations ==
The Festival, Playhouse, and Great Hall are physically separate structures from the main structure, with rubber acoustic gaskets filling the gaps between them. This prevents sound from vibrating through the floors and walls. To further reduce vibration noise, the air conditioning chillers were originally installed on the roof of the nearby Green and Goodwin Student / Staff apartments. The chillers were eventually removed and the center is now on the standard campus-supplied chilled-water system.

The main hallway on the production level has an extra-wide and -high ceiling for the entire length which matches the size of the scenery shop and stage doors on the Playhouse and Festival theaters. This allows completed scenery to be moved directly from the scenery shop to the stages without the need to break apart and reassemble on the stage.

All three large stages have Stage Lifts (Hydraulic lifts replaced in 1999 with "Gala" Spira-Lifts) that can be used to create a recessed orchestra pit, hold additional seating, or extend the stage depending on the need of a particular performance. The Great Hall also has two retractable rear walls in the balcony which holds an additional two rows of seating behind the stage. The space nearest the stage holds additional seating for choral use and the farthest space was originally intended to house a pipe organ.

== Notable performances ==
Artists

- Anne-Sophie Mutter, renowned violinist - April 2025
- Renée Fleming, soprano and actress - January 2025
- Joe Pera, comedian - September 2024
- Ana Gasteyer, Actress - December 2023
- Emmylou Harris, Americana singer and songwriter - September 2023
- Ben Folds, Grammy-nominated singer and songwriter - March 2023
- Meredith Monk, American composer and vocalist - November 2022
- Jean-Yves Thibaudet, French pianist
- Christian McBride, Grammy-winning bassist and composer - May 2022
- Joan Jett, American rock artist - September 2021
- Buddy Guy, Grammy-winning blues guitarist - September 2019
- Pat Metheny, Grammy-winning jazz artist and composer - September 2019
- Joshua Bell, Grammy/winning violinist - April 2010, March 2004, February 2018
- Lang Lang, pianist - April 2010, March 2023
- Joshua Redman, jazz saxophonist - May 2008
- Zakir Hussain, acclaimed tabla player - April 2008, October 2024
- Kronos Quartet, avant-garde string quartet - April 2008
- Savion Glover, noted tap dancer - October 2007
- Chick Corea, multiple Grammy-winning jazz pianist - April 2007, April 2009
- Sonny Rollins, multiple Grammy-winning jazz saxophone legend - October 2006
- Yo-Yo Ma - March 2006
- Cecilia Bartoli, mezzo-soprano - October 2005
- Directions in Music, featuring Herbie Hancock (piano), Michael Brecker (saxophone), and Roy Hargrove (trumpet) - March 2005
- Clark Terry, Grammy-winning jazz trumpet player - March 2004
- Wynton Marsalis, Grammy-winning jazz trumpet player - April 1995
- Dee Dee Bridgewater, multiple Grammy-winning jazz vocalist - December 2003
- Maya Beiser, cellist - October 2003 (World Premiere The world to come)
- Kathleen Battle, noted soprano - 1989
- Luciano Pavarotti, Tenor - October 1980
- Kiri Te Kanawa, celebrated soprano - 1991
- Marilyn Horne, mezzo-soprano - 1990

Ensembles

- St. Olaf Choir - February 2012, February 2020
- China National Symphony Orchestra - February 2013
- National Symphony Orchestra of Cuba - October 2013
- Russian National Ballet Theatre - January 2011
- Schleswig-Holstein Festival Orchestra - April 2010
- Moscow State Radio Symphony Orchestra - February 2010
- Vienna Philharmonic Orchestra - March 2006
- Russian National Ballet - January 2006
- Royal Philharmonic Orchestra - January 2006
- Pittsburgh Symphony Orchestra - December 2005
- Munich Symphony Orchestra - October 2005
- Chicago Symphony Orchestra - February 2005
- Moscow State Radio Symphony - February 2004
- Vienna Symphony Orchestra - November 2003
- London Symphony Orchestra - May 2001
- Bolshoi Symphony Orchestra - February 2001

Festivals
The Krannert Center hosts the Ellnora Guitar Festival (formerly Wall to Wall Guitar Festival) every two years in September, beginning in 2005, which has featured artists such as Pat Metheny, Elliot Fisk, Andy Summers, Taj Mahal, Vernon Reid, Toubab Krewe, Campbell Brothers, The Romeros, Alex DeGrassi, Los Lobos, John McLaughlin, Jorma Kaukonen, and Buddy Guy.
Additionally, Krannert has sponsored the Pygmalion Music Festival every September since 2006, which has brought indie rock artists such as Iron & Wine, The Books, David Bazan, Danielson, Andrew Bird, Yo La Tengo, and High Places to the traditionally jazz and classical-oriented venue.

== See also ==
- List of concert halls
