= Ian Hobson =

English pianist, conductor and teacher

- Born: 1952 (age 73–74); Wolverhampton, England
- Origin: United Kingdom
- Education: Royal Academy of Music; Magdalene College, Cambridge; Yale University
- Genres: Classical
- Occupations: Pianist, conductor, teacher
- Instrument: Piano
- Awards: First Prize, Leeds International Piano Competition (1981); Silver Medal, Arthur Rubinstein Competition; Silver Medal, Vienna–Beethoven Competition

Ian Hobson is an English pianist, conductor, and teacher renowned for his performances of Romantic piano repertoire and his advocacy of lesser-known composers. A winner of the 1981 Leeds International Piano Competition, he has enjoyed an international career as both soloist and conductor. He is Professor Emeritus of Music at the University of Illinois Urbana–Champaign, has served on the faculty of Florida State University, and since September 2023 has served as Guest Conductor of Sinfonia Varsovia.

== Biography ==
Hobson was born in Wolverhampton. He studied at King Henry VIII School, Coventry, the Royal Academy of Music, Magdalene College, Cambridge, and Yale University in the United States. His teachers included Claude Frank, Ralph Kirkpatrick and Menahem Pressler.

Hobson made his London debut in 1979. He won silver medals in the Arthur Rubinstein and Vienna-Beethoven competitions and first prize in the 1981 Leeds International Pianoforte Competition. His United States debut came in 1983, and he has since performed in concert and recital in many countries and with many orchestras. He frequently conducts from the keyboard.

His piano repertoire includes:

- J.S. Bach: Goldberg Variations
- Mozart: Piano Concertos
- Beethoven: Piano Sonatas
- Mendelssohn: works for piano and orchestra
- Robert Schumann: Piano Sonatas
- Clara Schumann: Piano Concerto
- Moscheles: Piano Concertos
- Liszt: 2-piano arrangements of music by Saint-Saëns
- Brahms: Variations
- Rachmaninoff: 17 Études-Tableaux, comprising Études-Tableaux, Op. 33 and Études-Tableaux, Op. 39, 24 Preludes, and transcriptions
- Paderewski: Piano Concerto
- Godowsky: Studies on Chopin's Études, and transcriptions of Schubert lieder
- David Johnson: 12 Preludes and Fugues
- concertos by Huss and Schelling
- contemporary works by Benjamin Lees, Kevin Oldham, Ridout, Liptak and Gardner, some of which were written for him.

He has appeared in duo recital with his then wife Claude Edrei Hobson.

He has attracted world class instrumental soloists to appear with the Sinfonia da Camera, which he founded in 1984. His opera conducting activities include works from Giovanni Battista Pergolesi to Richard Strauss. For his own Zephyr label, he conducted the world premiere of a new concert edition of John Philip Sousa's operetta El Capitan, with the Sinfonia da Camera, and also recorded the work. His other recordings include Stravinsky's Histoire du soldat and Walton's Façade, with the baritone William Warfield.

Prior to joining the faculty at Florida State University, Hobson served as a music professor at the faculty of the University of Illinois at Urbana–Champaign. He has been a juror on a number of international music competitions. Hobson is the father of NPR Here & Now host Jeremy Hobson.
