= Lübeck Academy of Music =

Coordinates: 53°51′53″N 10°40′53″E

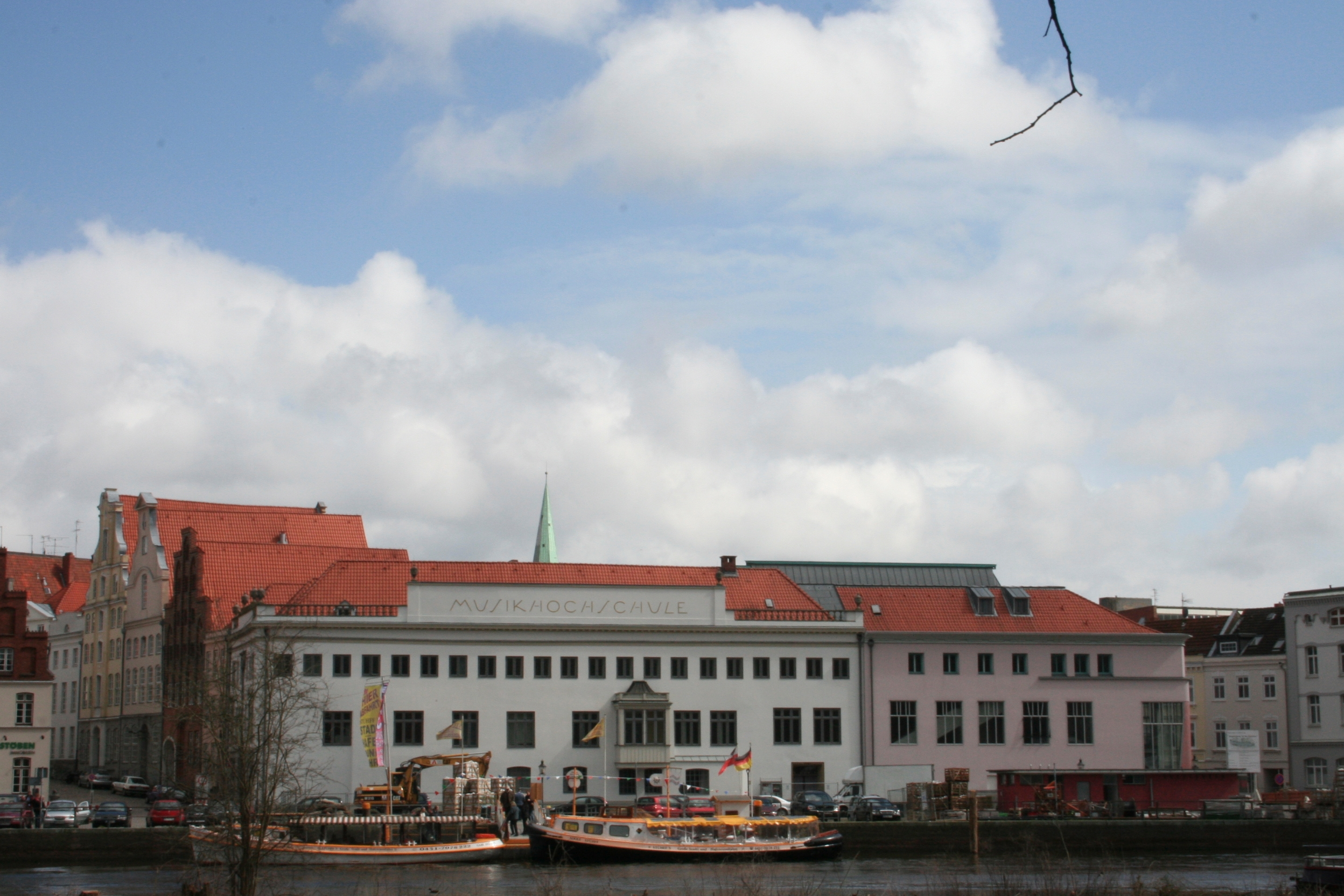
The music academy on the banks of the river Trave

The Lübeck Academy of Music (German: Musikhochschule Lübeck) in Lübeck, Germany, is the only higher level music school in the northernmost state of Schleswig-Holstein. The school is located in the World Heritage city of Lübeck, a historic hanseatic city. The school was founded in 1973 but its tradition goes back to 1911. The enrollment is approximately 500 students. The teaching staff includes Shmuel Ashkenasi, Sabine Meyer, James Tocco and others; current president is Rico Gubler.

The Schleswig-Holstein Musik Festival, an annual summer festival devoted to classical music, holds its master classes at the academy.

The school is a member of the Baltic Association of Music Academies.

== Alumni ==
Among the alumni of the Musikhochschule Lübeck is Catherine Rückwardt, who became Generalmusikdirektorin of the Staatstheater Mainz in 2001, as one of four women at the time of Germany's 76 opera houses, and held the post to 2011. Thomas Mohr became a baritone and later heldentenor, also an academic voice teacher and founder of a music festival on his agricultural estate. Nicola Jürgensen became a clarinetist and professor at the Folkwang Hochschule. Maxim Vengerov is a Russian-born Israeli violinist, violist, and conductor. Linus Roth became a violinist and academic teacher.

== See also ==
- Music schools in Germany
