= L'infedeltà delusa =

Comic opera by Joseph Haydn

- burletta per musica by Joseph Haydn
- Haydn portrait by Thomas Hardy (1791)
- Translation: Deceit Outwitted
- Librettist: Marco Coltellini
- Language: Italian
- Premiere: 26 July 1773; Eszterháza

L'infedeltà delusa (Deceit Outwitted), Hob. 28/5, is an operatic burletta per musica in two acts by Joseph Haydn. The Italian libretto was by Marco Coltellini.

== Performance history ==
The earliest recorded performance, which may have been the premiere, was at Eszterháza (in modern Hungary) on 26 July 1773. This was the name day of the Dowager Princess Estaházy and this date is given in the printed libretto. Haydn was asked by his employer, Nicolaus Esterházy, to write an opera specifically for the Dowager Princess' name day; he originally intended to rewrite his previous opera Acide e Galatea, but the project was abandoned after he had written several sketches. It was revived for the visit of Empress Maria Theresa on 1 September 1773, and again on 1 July 1774.

It was revived in a modified form in Vienna in 1930; a radio performance was given in Budapest in 1952, and the original version was staged in the same city in 1959 as part of a Haydn Congress. The publication of a critical edition in 1962 gave rise to more productions: at Drottningholm with Margareta Hallin as Vespina, in Hannover, and at the Holland Festival.

University of Kent in collaboration with Kent Opera staged the opera in English at the Gulbenkian Theatre in 1978, conducted by Harry Newstone and directed by Christopher Webber. Arthur Jacobs noted for the Garsington Opera production in 1993 that the character of Vespina "dressing up in four differently absurd costumes, anticipates the character in Così fan tutte whose name is hers with the slightest alteration. (Vespina means ‘little wasp’; Despina is arbitrary.)". The work was performed as part of the 2008 Aix-en-Provence Festival, conducted by Jérémie Rhorer. In 2014, it was performed by New Chamber Opera at New College, Oxford. Sarasota Opera gave the work in March 2024.

== Roles ==
Roles, voice types, premiere cast
Role	Voice type	Premiere cast, July 26, 1773
Vespina, a spirited young woman, sister of Nanni, in love with Nencio	soprano	Maddalena Friberth
Nanni, a peasant, in love with Sandrina	bass	Christian Specht
Sandrina, a simple girl, in love with Nanni	soprano	Barbara Dichtler
Filippo, an old peasant, father of Sandrina	tenor	Carl Friberth
Nencio, a well-to-do farmer	tenor	Leopold Dichtler

== Synopsis ==
The opera is set in the Tuscan countryside.

Act 1

Filippo, brother and sister Nanni and Vespina, and rich farmer Nencio admire the beauty of the summer evening. Filippo is concluding a deal with Nencio. Sandrina, Filippo's daughter, enters; the others leave her alone with her father, who tells her that he has found her a husband. She protests that she loves only Nanni, but Filippo dismisses the thought of her marrying a poor man. When Nanni arrives, Sandrina is sad, and torn between love for him and respect for her father. Nanni vows vengeance on Filippo and the man chosen to be Sandrina's husband.

In a room in Nanni and Vespina's house, Vespina sings of the pain of love but longs for its pleasures. She reveals that she is in love with Nencio, whose behaviour puzzles her. Nanni tells her that Nencio wishes to marry Sandrina, and both swear vengeance.

Outside Filippo's house, Nencio sings a serenade to Sandrina. Vespina and Nanni eavesdrop on him as he asks Filippo to send Sandrina to him. Despite Sandrina's tears, Nencio says he will marry her come what may. Vespina enters and slaps him; Nencio and Filippo refuse to budge. Vespina and Nanni are furious, while Sandrina laments her predicament.

Act 2

Vespina has disguised herself as an old woman so that when Filippo and Sandrina come out of the house, she will tell them that Nencio was secretly married but abandoned her daughter. Filippo, angry at Nencio's supposed duplicity, hurls insults at him; Nencio, baffled by this, is next approached by Vespina, this time disguised as a German servant, who says that her master, a marquis, will be taking Sandrina as his wife. Nencio thinks he now understands the reason for Filippo's anger, but Vespina reappears now as the Marquis de Ripafratta, saying that although he promised to marry Sandrina, he wouldn't marry below his station and will therefore trick her into marrying one of his scullions. Nencio is pleased by the anticipated humiliation of Filippo and offers to be a witness. Vespina assures Nanni that her ruses will succeed.

Filippo is delighted by Sandrina's prospects as the wife of a marquis, but his daughter says that she wants love, not luxury. In her fourth disguise, Vespina enters as a notary, accompanied by Nanni, who is disguised as a servant, and Nencio. A marriage contract is signed and witnessed, Filippo believing the bridegroom to be the marquis, Nencio thinking it the servant. When the disguises are thrown off, Sandrina is shown to be married to her beloved Nanni. Vespina confesses her tricks, Filippo accepts the outcome, and Vespina looks forward to wedding the chastened Nencio.

== Orchestration ==
The opera is scored for two oboes, two bassoons, two horns, timpani, strings, and continuo.

== Recordings ==
- 1968 – Emilia Ravaglia (Vespina), Elisabeth Speiser (Sandrina), Umberto Grilli (Filippo), Giorgio Grimaldi (Nencio), Robert El Hage (Nanni) – Orchestra of the Haydn Foundation, Rome, Antonio de Almeida – 3 LPs (Le Chant du Monde and Musical Heritage Society)
- 1967 – Magda Kalmár (Vespina), Júlia Pászthy (Sandrina), István Rozsos (Filippo), Attila Fülöp (Nencio), József Gregor (Nanni) – Franz Liszt Chamber Orchestra, Frigyes Sándor – 2 CDs (Hungaroton)
- 1981 – Edith Mathis (Vespina), Barbara Hendricks (Sandrina), Aldo Baldin (Filippo), Claes H. Ahnsjö (Nencio), Michael Devlin (Nanni) – Orchestre de Chambre de Lausanne, Antal Doráti – 2 CDs (Philips Records). This was recorded as part of the Haydn Eszterháza Opera Cycle on Philips
- 1989 – Nancy Argenta (Vespina), Lena Lootens (Sandrina), Christoph Prégardien (Filippo), Markus Schäfer (Nencio), Stephen Varcoe (Nanni) – La Petite Bande, Sigiswald Kuijken – 2 CDs (Deutsche Harmonia Mundi)
