= Ilona Fehér =

Hungarian violinist (1901–1988)

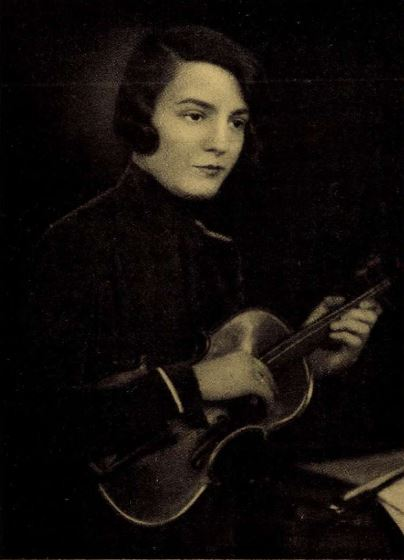
Fehér in 1930

Ilona Feher or Ilona Fehér (Hebrew: אילונה פהר, Hungarian pronunciation: [ˈfɛheːr ˈilonɒ]; 1 December 1901 – January 1988), was one of the representatives of the Hungarian Violin School whose greats include Joseph Böhm, Joseph Joachim, Jakob Grün, Leopold Auer, Jenő Hubay, Carl Flesch, Joseph Szigeti, Tibor Varga, Sandor Vegh, André Gertler, Kato Havas, Paul Rolland and Geza Szilvay. She was also a noted violin teacher. She was born in Budapest and died in Holon, Israel.

== Biography ==
=== Early years ===
Fehér studied with Jenő Hubay for six years at the Franz Liszt Academy of Music in Budapest. Other violin teachers of her early years were József Bloch, Josef Smilovitch (also a pupil of Jenő Hubay) and Imre Pogány.

=== Europe ===
Between the two world wars she performed all over Europe, in particular with Willem Mengelberg and the Royal Concertgebouw Orchestra in Amsterdam, the Netherlands.

Fehér lived in Budapest until 1942 when she was interned with her daughter in a concentration camp. They managed to escape in 1944, and joined Hungarian and Czechoslovak partisans until the liberation by the Soviet Red Army. She later returned to the concert stage to perform only in Soviet-controlled Eastern Europe.

=== Emigration to Israel and teaching ===
In 1949 she emigrated to Israel to begin a new life as a violin teacher. Within 25 years she had built herself a reputation as an Inspired Teacher of strong discipline, but not without a sense of humour. Her 250 pupils include some of the most outstanding violinists such as Pinkas Zukerman, Shlomo Mintz, Hagai Shaham, Ittai Shapira, Moshe Hammer and Yehonatan Berick, chamber music players Shmuel Ashkenasi and David Ehrlich as well as orchestra musician, Ron Ephrat (Principal Violist Rotterdam Philharmonic), Yaakov Rubinstein (Concertmaster of the Bamberg Symphony Orchestra) and conductor Yoel Levi. See: List of music students by teacher: C to F#Ilona Fehér. In addition to teaching at the Rubin Academy in Tel Aviv, Feher held master classes all over the world. She frequently served as jurist in international violin competitions in Munich and Freiburg, Germany, the Spohr competition.

== Awards ==
Feher was awarded the Golden Medal and Diploma of the Franz Liszt Academy in Budapest. She was also made an Honorary Doctor of the Weizmann Institute of Science in Rehovot, Israel, and Honorary Citizen of the city of Holon which was always her home town in Israel. In a concert which was designed as a celebration of Isaac Stern's 65th birthday in Carnegie Hall, she was honored by King Solomon Award of the America-Israel Cultural Foundation.

== See also ==
- Ilona Feher Foundation
