= Ilona Feher Foundation =

Israeli nonprofit organization for young violinists

- Formation: 2003; 23 years ago
- Founders: Hagai Shaham, Ittai Shapira
- Type: Non-profit
- Purpose: Nurturing the artistic development of exceptional young Israeli violinists
- Services: Grants, performing opportunities, recordings, instrument loans, private lessons, master classes
- Fields: Music education

The Ilona Feher Foundation was established in 2003 as a nonprofit organization committed to nurturing the artistic development of exceptional young Israeli violinists. The foundation honors the late violin pedagogue Ilona Feher (1901–1988) whose guidance helped shape some of Israel's greatest violinists, notable Pinchas Zukerman, Shlomo Mintz, Shmuel Ashkenasi, Hagai Shaham and Ittai Shapira.

The foundation is set up to award promising young violinists grants which may be applied towards various performing opportunities, recordings, or instrument loans.

In addition, the foundation also provides opportunities for private lessons, master classes, and other intensive courses in Israel and abroad.

The foundation was founded by Hagai Shaham and Ittai Shapira.

== Board members ==
- Nechemia Dagan
- Glen Roven
- Hagai Shaham
- Ittai Shapira
- Mark Steinberg.

== Advisory committee ==
- Shmuel Ashkenasi
- Christopher T. Dunworth
- Pamela Frank
- Miriam Fried, Dick Hyman
- Jamie Laredo
- Yoel Levi
- Cho-Liang Lin
- Shlomo Mintz
- János Starker
- Arnold Steinhardt
- Shulamit Ran
- Amnon Weinstein
- Eric Wen
