= Laura Samuel (violinist) =

British violinist (1976–2024)

- Born: Laura Helen Samuel; 4 January 1976; London, United Kingdom
- Died: 21 November 2024 (aged 48)
- Occupation: Violinist
- Known for: Belcea Quartet, BBC Scottish Symphony Orchestra

Laura Helen Samuel (4 January 1976 – 21 November 2024) was a British violinist. She was a member and the co-founder of Belcea Quartet and leader of the BBC Scottish Symphony Orchestra.

== Biography ==
Samuel was born in 1976 in London, one of two daughters of Alison Samuel (née Paul) and Robert Samuel. She studied at the Royal College of Music in the 1990s together with Romanian violinist Corina Belcea. They played music just for fun together in a string quartet. As they were successful, the four quartet members were exempted from orchestra lessons and they founded the Belcea Quartet, with Samuel as second violinist. Samuel played in the Belcea Quartet from 1994 to 2010. They won many prizes and gave concerts in the United States, Asia and Europe. In 2010 Samuel wanted to focus on her orchestral career. After an audition, she was accepted as a concertmaster in the BBC Scottish Symphony Orchestra. In 2012, Samuel became the leader of the orchestra.

In the early stages of her career, she received a number of prizes, including those of the Royal Over-Seas League, Musicians Benevolent Fund, Manoug Parikian Award, and the TWIYCA Competition.

She had a five-year residency at the Wigmore Hall in London. As a teacher, she worked for institutions such as the Guildhall School of Music and Drama, Royal Northern College of Music and the Royal Conservatoire of Scotland. Samuel joined the Nash Ensemble in 2010.

After a long illness, Samuel died on 21 November 2024, at the age of 48 from leiomyosarcoma, a rare form of cancer. Her parents, her sister Naomi, and her husband Mark Patterson survive her. The BBC Scottish Symphony Orchestra dedicated a concert to her after her death. Ryan Wigglesworth composed the work for Laura, after Bach in memory of Samuel.
