= Frigyes Sándor =

Hungarian conductor

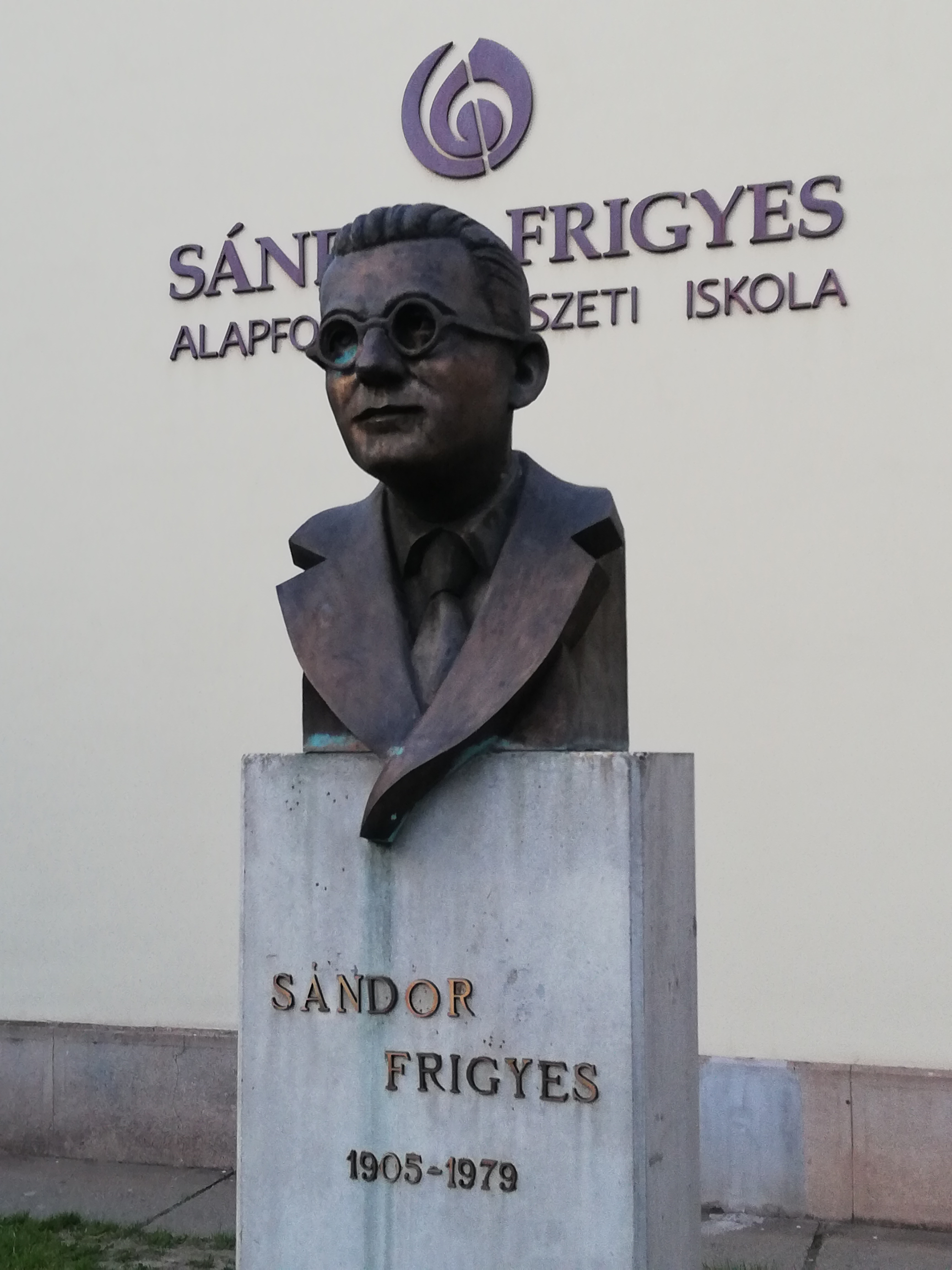
- Monument for Sándor
- Born: 24 April 1905; Budapest, Hungary
- Died: 1 June 1979 (aged 74); Budapest, Hungary
- Education: Royal Hungarian Academy of Music
- Occupations: Conductor; Violinist; Academic teacher
- Organization: Franz Liszt Chamber Orchestra

Frigyes Sándor (24 April 1905 – 1 June 1979) was a Hungarian conductor, known for conducting the Franz Liszt Chamber Orchestra.

== Life and career ==
Sándor was born in Budapest on 24 April 1905 to a Jewish family. He studied violin from age 10 at the Royal Hungarian Academy of Music in Budapest, first with József Bloch, then with Gyula Mambriny, Rezső Kemény and Imre Waldbauer. He was concert master of the Budapest Choral and Orchestra Association from 1926, and from 1933 also their assistant conductor. He was a conductor of several orchestras by the mid-1930s, especially in Baroque, classical music and contemporary Hungarian music. He conducted the first performance in Hungary of Bártok's Divertimento for String Orchestra, composed in 1939.

From 1939, he was only allowed to perform for Jewish audiences, due to anti-Jewish laws. The following year he married Vera Dénes. He was subjected to forced labour. After World War II, he conducted an orchestra in Budapest and taught at a music school, also serving as the school's headmaster from 1949, and as leader of its choir and orchestra. He taught at the Franz Liszt Academy of Music from 1958 to 1975.

Sándor founded the Franz Liszt Chamber Orchestra, mostly formed by his students, in 1963. He was their first conductor until his death.

Sándor died in Budapest on 1 June 1979, at the age of 74.
