= Belcea Quartet =

String quartet

The Belcea Quartet is a string quartet, formed in 1994, under the leadership of violinist Corina Belcea.

== History ==
The quartet was formed while its members were studying at the Royal College of Music in London. Whilst there, they were coached by the Chilingirian Quartet. They subsequently studied with the Alban Berg Quartet at Cologne.

The quartet was one of the first groups to participate in the BBC Radio 3 New Generation Artists scheme, from 1999 to 2001. They made their Carnegie Hall debut in 2000 as part of the 'Distinctive Debuts' series. Their first performance at the Edinburgh International Festival was in August 2001. The Belcea Quartet were quartet in-residence at Wigmore Hall in London from 2001 to 2006. During their Wigmore residency, the quartet participated in the first performances of The Canticle of the Rose by Joseph Phibbs.

== Current members ==
- Corina Belcea-Fisher, violin
- Suyeon Kang, violin, since 2022
- Krzysztof Chorzelski, viola
- Antoine Lederlin, cello, since 2006

== Former members ==
- Alasdair Tait, cello, 1998–2006
- Laura Samuel, violin, until 2010
- Matthew Talty, cello, until 1998
- Axel Schacher, violin, 2010–2022

== Recordings ==
Partial list of recordings:

- Debussy, Dutilleux, Ravel – String Quartets, 2001
- Schubert – String Quartets, 2002
- Brahms – String Quartets, 2004
- Britten – String Quartets, 2005
- Schubert – Trout Quintet (with pianist Thomas Adès), 2005
- Mozart – String Quartets, 2006 (original line-up)
- Bartók – Complete String Quartets, 2008
- Schubert – String Quintet (with Valentin Erben), Quartet in G, Quartet in D minor, 2009
- Beethoven – Complete String Quartets, 2014

== Selected concert reviews ==
- Tim Ashley, "Belcea/ Bostridge/ Adès". The Guardian, 7 December 2001.
- Ivan Hewett, "Poise and personality". Telegraph, 9 July 2002.
- Tom Service, "Bostridge/ Drake/ Belcea Quartet". The Guardian, 19 August 2002.
- Geoffrey Norris, "Quest for the new". Telegraph, 31 October 2002.
- Geoffrey Norris, "Profundity and vision". Telegraph, 4 March 2003.
- David Fanning, "Aldeburgh Festival: precision of a madman". Telegraph, 24 June 2003.
- Andrew Clements, "The Turn of the Screw". The Guardian, 20 July 2004.
- Tom Service, "Belcea Quartet/Kildea". The Guardian, 1 November 2004.
- Erica Jeal, "Janacek at 150". The Guardian, 16 December 2004.
- Rian Evans, "An Evening in Buenos Aires" (review from Bath Festival). The Guardian, 7 June 2005.
- George Hall, review of June 2005 Wigmore Hall concert. The Guardian, 22 June 2005.
- Geoffrey Norris, "Four strings weave a taut web". Telegraph, 5 June 2006.
- Geoffrey Norris, "Apt tribute to Britten's originality". Telegraph, 5 December 2006.
