= YCAT =

YCAT may refer to:

- Youth Climate Action Team, Inc., an international 501(c)4 climate justice advocacy non-profit organization driving and amplifying intersectional activism
- York Community Access Television, a public-access television station in York, Pennsylvania, USA
- Young Classical Artists Trust, a trust that promotes young classical soloists and chamber ensembles trained in the United Kingdom
- Yuma County Area Transit, a public transit bus system in Yuma County, Arizona
