= Neil Thomson (conductor) =

- Born: May 23, 1966 (age 59); London, England
- Genres: Classical
- Occupation: conductor
- Instrument: Viola

Neil William Thomson (born 23 May 1966) is a British conductor and conducting professor.

Neil Thomson was born in London in 1966, and educated at Dulwich College. He then studied violin and viola at the Royal Academy of Music (1984–87) and conducting with Norman Del Mar at the Royal College of Music (1987–89). He was a member of the conducting class at Tanglewood Summer School in 1989 where his teachers included Gustav Meier, Seiji Ozawa, Kurt Sanderling and Leonard Bernstein.

Since March 2014 he has served as Principal Conductor and Artistic Director of the Philharmonic Orchestra of Goiás, Brazil. In the UK he has conducted the London Symphony Orchestra, the London Philharmonic Orchestra, the Philharmonia, the Royal Philharmonic Orchestra, the Royal Liverpool Philharmonic, the Royal Scottish National Orchestra, the Hallé, the BBC Symphony Orchestra, the Ulster Orchestra and the Orchestra of Welsh National Opera.

Recent debuts include concerts with the São Paulo Symphony Orchestra, Brazilian Symphony Orchestra, Minas Gerais Philharmonic Orchestra, Yomiuri Nippon Symphony Orchestra, Tokyo Philharmonic, the Century Orchestra Osaka, the Kansai Philharmonic, the Lahti Sinfonia, the Romanian National Orchestra, the Britten Sinfonia, the Ulster Orchestra, the RTÉ Concert Orchestra, the Orchestra of Gothenburg Opera, Aarhus Symphony Orchestrathe Cork Concert Orchestra, and the Orchestra of Opera North.

He has performed with Sir James Galway, Dame Moura Lympany, Sir Thomas Allen, Dame Felicity Lott, Philip Langridge, Sarah Chang, Antônio Meneses, Steven Isserlis, Julian Lloyd Webber, David Geringas, Natalie Clein, Ittai Shapira, György Pauk, Brett Dean, Jean-Philippe Collard, Stephen Hough, Peter Jablonski, Jean-Louis Steuerman, Dame Evelyn Glennie and Sir Richard Rodney Bennett.

Recent collaborations include a Schumann Cello Concerto with Steven Isserlis, an opera gala with Danielle de Niese, a tour in Brazil with Antônio Meneses, Liszt Second Piano Concerto and Brahms Second Piano Concerto with Stephen Hough, the premiere of Joseph Phibbs's new Percussion Concerto with Dame Evelyn Glennie and a rare performance of the complete Incidental Music written by Frederick Delius for Flecker's drama Hassan at the Cheltenham Festival. He recently stepped in at three days' notice to replace Louis Langrée with the São Paulo Symphony Orchestra conducting works by Messiaen, Scriabin, Richard Strauss, Mozart and Tchaikovsky. This led to immediate re-invitations for 2017 and 2018 where he will be conducting two weeks in the subscription series in both years.

Alongside his symphonic work he has developed a speciality for conducting films with live orchestra. He gave the premiere of the newly reconstructed score for Singin' in the Rain at the Royal Albert Hall in London in 2013. Other films include Psycho, Vertigo, Casablanca, The Wizard of Oz, Fantasia, Amadeus and Titanic.

Recordings include a disc of American contemporary violin concerti with Ittai Shapira and the Royal Liverpool Philharmonic Orchestra and two discs of orchestral music by César Guerra-Peixe with the Goias Philharmonic Orchestra. He is currently engaged on a project to record all 14 symphonies of Cláudio Santoro for Naxos with the OFG.

He has been a guest professor at the Mozarteum in Salzburg, the Krakow Academy of Music, the Conservatoire "Arrigo Boito" in Parma, the Lithuanian Academy of Music, the Campos do Jordao Festival and the Los Angeles Conducting Workshop.
