= Antal Molnár (musicologist) =

Antal Molnár (January 7, 1890, Budapest – December 7, 1983, Budapest) was a Hungarian musicologist, violist, composer, and music educator. According to Grove Music Online he was "one of the founders of modern Hungarian musicology".

From 1907 to 1910 Molnár studied music composition with Victor von Herzfeld at the Budapest Academy of Music (BAM). He traveled Hungary and Transylvania collecting folk music from 1910 to 1912 while simultaneously working as a violist in the Waldbauer String Quartet. From 1912 to 1918 he worked as a school music teacher in Budapest before being appointed a professor at BAM in 1918 where he taught until his retirement in 1959.

Molnár was the author of numerous monographs on composers; including the first monograph written on composer Zoltán Kodály. He was the recipient of several awards and prizes, including the Baumgarten Prize for literature in 1938 and the Kossuth Prize in 1957. The Baumgarten prize led to the publication of his first book on musical aesthetics, Zeneesztétika (1938). He later published a second book on this topic, Gyakorlati zeneesztétika (1971). He authored many other books and papers on a wide range of music topics. He also composed chamber music, orchestral music, vocal music, and works for solo piano and organ. Several of his compositions were written for teaching purposes.
