= Ittai Shapira =

Israeli-American violinist (born 1972)

- Born: December 18, 1972 (age 53); Rochester, New York, U.S.
- Occupations: Violinist, Composer, and Curator

Ittai Shapira (born December 18, 1972) is an Israeli-American violinist, composer, and curator. His compositions include Concierto Latino, a concerto for Solo Violin, and seven Double Concertos. He is the founder and artistic director of Sound Potential, Inc., an artistic consultant for the Weill Cornell Music and Medicine Program, and is co-founder of the Ilona Feher Foundation with violinist Hagai Shaham.

== Early life and education ==
Shapira was born in Rochester, NY, but grew up in Israel. He first studied with Rima Kaminkovsky, and later with Ilona Fehér. He continued his studies with Dorothy DeLay, Robert Mann graduating from the Juilliard School class of 94.

== Performing career ==
Engagements include performances with the BBC Concert Orchestra, Belgrade Philharmonic under Sir Neville Marriner, Cape Town Philharmonic, Czech National Symphony under Libor Pešek, Detroit Symphony under Yoel Levi, English Chamber Orchestra with Yuri Bashmet at the Barbican Centre, Israel Chamber Orchestra, Israeli Virtuosi at Alice Tully Hall, hosted by Itzhak Perlman, the Philharmonia, Polish Chamber Orchestra, Rochester Philharmonic, Royal Philharmonic, Russian Philharmonic with Thomas Sanderling, and the Symphony Orchestras of Budapest, Harrisburg, Jerusalem, Omaha and Shanghai.

Shapira made his Carnegie Hall debut in 2003 with the Orchestra of St. Luke's, performing the world premiere of the Violin Concerto written for him by compatriot Shulamit Ran. His live recording of this concerto is featured in a compilation of Shulamit Ran's works, performed by Daniel Barenboim and the Chicago Symphony Orchestra. He returned to the stage as a soloist, with the American Symphony, and Glenn Close.

Other performances include a tour of Finland and Sweden with the Oulu Sinfonia, a tour of Shapira's Violin Concertos Concierto Latino, with the Key West Symphony, and The Old Man and the Sea with The Knights.

He continues to tour as a soloist, with his own compositions, with orchestras in Austria, Brazil and the United States.

== Compositions ==
Shapira's first composition was a concerto for Solo Violin, Concierto Latino, recorded in 2011 by the London Serenata under the baton of Krzysztof Chorzelski.

He went on to compose seven Concertos:

- The Old Man and the Sea, a Violin Concerto inspired by Ernest Hemingway's short novel, released in 2012 by Champs Hill Records with the Royal Liverpool Philharmonic. The work was co-commissioned by the Madison Theatre at Molloy College for the inaugural season of the "Innovative Classics" series.
- Magyar for two Violins, dedicated to colleague Hagai Shaham, was performed and recorded in Austria in 2014 with the dedicatee and the Arpeggione Orchestra, conducted by Robert Bokor.
- The Ethics was composed for the 70th anniversary of the Theresienstadt camp. It is inspired by Brundibár, a Children's opera performed at the camp and was written in collaboration with anthropologist Natasha Zaretsky. The work premiered at Zankel Hall at Carnegie Hall in May 2015, written for Humanity in Action and co-sponsored by the Blavatnik Family Foundation.
- Sephardic Journeys, for Violin and Cello, is a musical story of the Sephardi Jews. It is a composition which examines questions of diaspora and migration, its inspiration originating from a desire to rebuild Identity, Empathy and collective memory through Music. Co-commissioned by the Krueger Foundation, it was recorded in September 2017 by the BBC National Orchestra of Wales, with cellist Thomas Carroll and conductor Rumon Gamba.
- Midnight's Children, a multidisciplinary project in close collaboration with Sir Salman Rushdie and visual artist Alexander Klingspor. The two works are coupled on a recording with the BBC National Orchestra of Wales, released by Champs Hill Records.
- Chunhyang for Violin and Soprano, a collaboration with philosopher Laureen Park.
- The Stolen Generations is a concerto for Flute and Violin inspired by music of the Métis, Inuit and First Nations.

He is also the creator of a set of Solo Violin Caprices.

== Discography ==
Shapira's discography of over 20 CD's (for labels including Champs Hill Records, EMI, Meridian Records, Sanctuary Classics, Quartz and Sony/BMG) includes both standard and contemporary repertoire. Shapira's playing is featured in the soundtrack of a film made about Daniel Pearl, The Journalist and the Jihadi, and a children's project with Brooke Shields, The Runaway Bunny. The performance was hosted by Larry King and reached an audience of 55 million on the Jerry Lewis Telethon, and was nationally televised in the US.

Fourteen concertos have been dedicated to him by composers such as Avner Dorman and Dave Heath, the most recent being the Katrina Violin Concerto by Theodore Wiprud. He has recently premiered a Violin and Mandolin Concerto with Avi Avital, Tikkun Olam composed by Ariel Blumenthal and conducted by Florin Parvulescu, a project he curated as a soloist in a joint project between the San Francisco Symphony and Conservatory.

== Awards and recognition ==
A recipient of the Clairmont Award, he has served as Classical Advisor at Molloy College and the Weill Cornell Music and Medicine Program, and has given concert lectures about Music and the Brain at the University of Cambridge (UK), Mount Sinai Hospital, and New York University. He has also given a concert lecture about the healing potential of music at One to One Global Forum, co-sponsored by the UN Foundation and Chabbad.

He was selected to be the first Affiliate at the Royal College of Music in London.

He is a recipient of the Victor Herbert Foundation award in recognition of his projects as Soloist, Composer and Curator.

== Further work ==
Shapira co-founded the Ilona Feher Foundation with violinist Hagai Shaham. The foundation is dedicated to the nurturing and promotion of young Israeli violinists.

Shapira performs regularly for charitable causes, sharing the stage with performers such as Sandy Duncan, Cady Huffman, Donna McKechnie and Martin Short.

He is the founder and Artistic Director of Sound Potential, Inc., a non profit foundation dedicated to medical, educational, and societal healing through music.

== Violin ==
Shapira plays a 1745 Guadagnini Violin.
