= Josef Waldbauer =

Austro-Hungarian musician

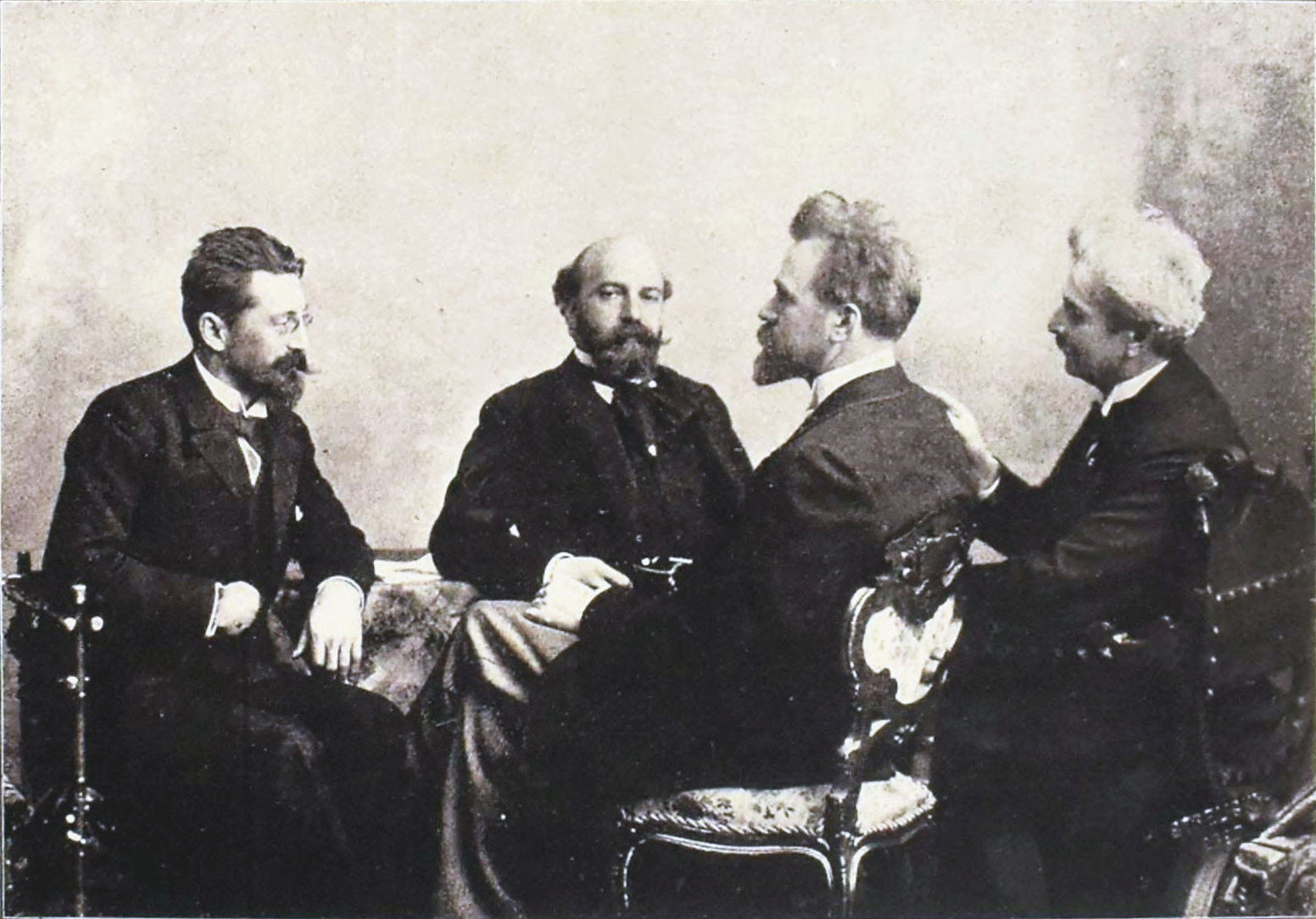
Josef Waldbauer

Josef Waldbauer (also Joseph Waldbauer, József Waldbauer) (1861–1920) was an Austro-Hungarian composer, violinist and music educator.

Josef Waldbauer was born in Austria in a peasant family. He moved to Budapest where he studied violin at the National Conservatory with Alois Gobbi. From 1888 to 1898 he was a violist of Hubay-Popper Quartet. At the same time he was a music teacher in different schools: in 1891/92 in the commercial boys secondary school which was located on the 35 Soroksári Way, and in 1896/97 in the boys school which was situated on the 17 Knézits Street. In 1898 he left the Quartet because he was assigned as a secretary of the Budapest Chamber Music Society. In 1910–1914 he was inspector of the violin section of the high professional music courses in Budapest. He was the father and the first teacher of the violinist Imre Waldbauer (1892–1952).

Josef Waldbauer was buried at Kerepesi Cemetery in Budapest.

== Works ==
- (as advisor of Alois Gobbi): Hegedűiskola. Bevezetés az I. fekvés használatába (School of violin. Introduction to the 1st position), Budapest, Rózsavölgyi és Társa, 1913;

== Sources ==
- Antal Molnár: Eretnek gondolatok a muzsikáról (Heretic Thoughts on Music), Gondolat, Budapest 1976), p. 27–28
- Karl Goldmark: Erinnerungen aus meinem Leben, Rikola, Wien 1922
