= Vincze =

Vincze is a Hungarian surname. Notable people with the surname include:

- Adela Vinczeová (born 1980), Slovak television presenter
- Ernie Vincze (1942–2024), Hungarian cinematographer
- Gábor Vincze (born 1976), Hungarian footballer
- Ilona Vincze-Kraus (1902–1998), Hungarian classical pianist
- Ion Vincze (1910–1996), Romanian communist politician and diplomat
- István Vincze (born 1967), Hungarian footballer
- Jenő Vincze (1908–1988), Hungarian footballer and manager
- László Vincze, multiple people
- Lilla Vincze (born 1961), Hungarian singer
- Melinda Vincze (born 1983), Hungarian handball player
- Ottó Vincze (born 1974), Hungarian footballer
- Péter Vincze (born 1995), Hungarian ice hockey player
- Péter Vincze (alpine skier) (born 1975), Hungarian alpine skier
- Zoltán Vincze (born 1974), Hungarian footballer
- Zsigmond Vincze (1874–1935), Hungarian pianist, conductor and composer
