= Alois Gobbi =

Hungarian violinist, conductor and composer (1842–1932)

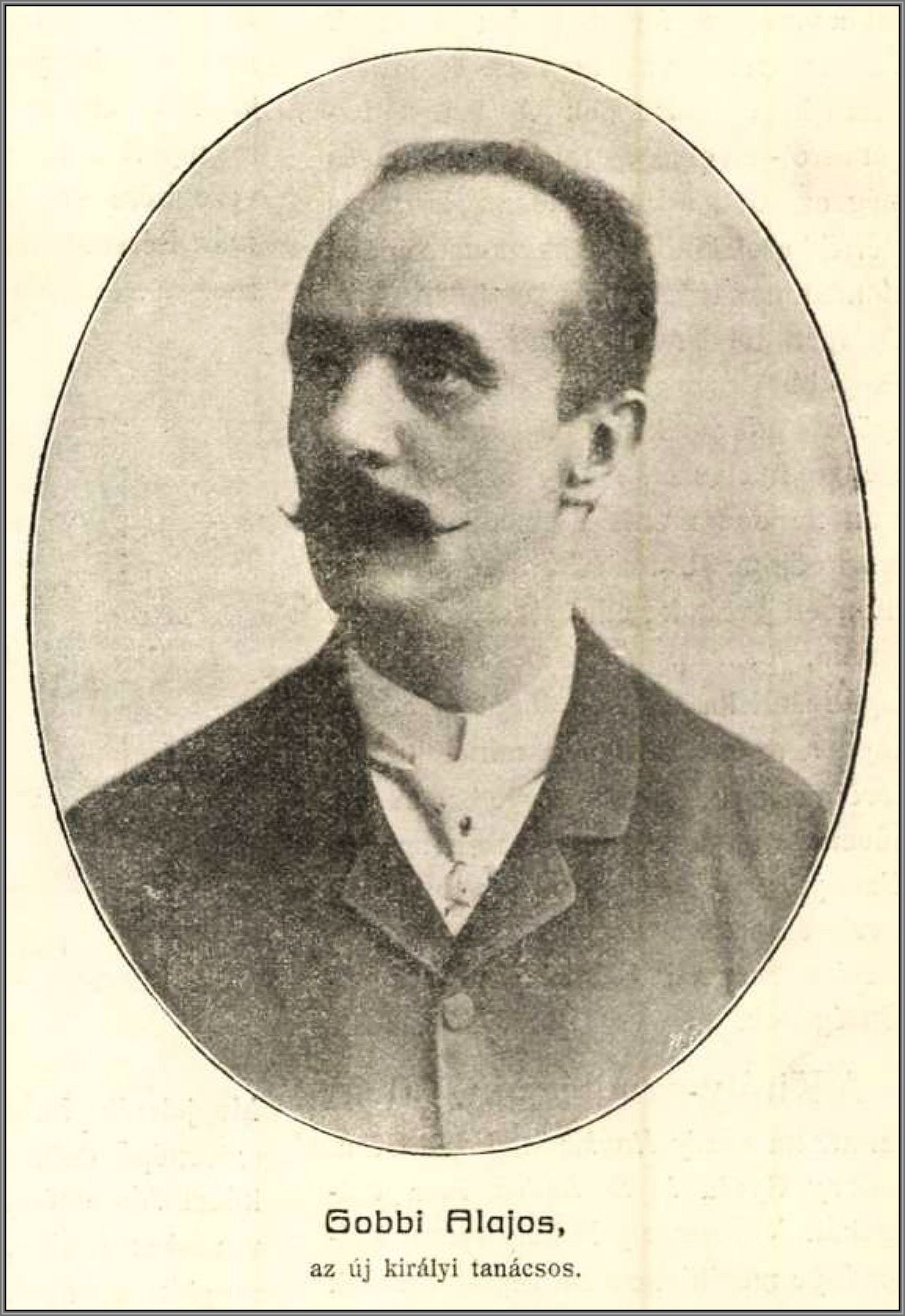
Alois Gobbi

Alois Gobbi (Hungarian: Gobbi Alajos; December 20, 1842 in Pest, Terézváros, Austrian Empire – July 27, 1932, Budapest, Hungary) was a Hungarian violinist, violin teacher, conductor and composer.

== Early life ==
His father Alois Gobbi-Ruggieri born in Mantua, Italy, to an aristocratic family was a violin professor in Pest, where he settled after his marriage with Viennese singer Maria Roth, mother of Alois junior. Alois Gobbi Jr was a younger brother of the Liszt pupil Henri Gobbi (1841–1920) and a grandfather of the actress Hilda Gobbi (1913–1988).

== Career ==
He studied singing with Mathias Engesser and Gotthard Wöhler, composition and piano with Carl Thern, and violin with Karl Huber (musician) (father of Jenő Hubay) and David Ridley-Kohne at the National Conservatory in Budapest. After 1862 during one year he studied in Munich violin with Ferdinand Laub, whom he also assisted. In 1863 he was invited as first violinist at the National Theatre in Budapest. He held this position as well as orchestra director during the next 19 years. From 1884 to 1888 he played in the Royal Opera House orchestra. He was also a first committee member of the Budapest Philharmonic Society.

In 1871 Gobbi was invited to teach violin at the National Conservatory, and on February 7, 1872 he was appointed to the violin professor of the National Conservatory. Alois Gobbi has educated more than thousand students, among there are: Eugen Adorján, Josef Bloch, Eugen Huban, Rudolf Kemény, Julius Rigó, Leo Altmann, Karl Faludi, Josef Friedmann, Stefan Horváth, Béla Jaulusz, Stefan Kerner, Wilhelm Kladioko, Árpád Késmárky, Stefan Máthé, Desider Nemes, Albert Metz, Ferdinand Tischinger, Ferdinand Riedl, Charlotte Szeszler, Dr. Ludwig Steiger, Elsa Totis, Waldmann brothers, Josef Waldbauer, Moriz Vavrinecz and others. In 1885, after Karl Huber's death, Gobbi was appointed to the conductor of the conservatory student orchestra, which he enhanced with the wood-wind students, and increased to very high level. Joseph Joachim who played once with the orchestra Max Bruch's Violin concerto was so delighted with the accompaniment, that he embarrassed Alois Gobbi in front of the audience. From 1901 to 1918 Gobbi was director of the institution.

== Works ==
- (In collaboration with Josef Waldbauer): Hegedűiskola. Bevezetés az I. fekvés használatába (School of violin. Introduction to the 1st position), Budapest, Rózsavölgyi és Társa, 1913;
