= Krzysztof Chorzelski =

Krzysztof Chorzelski (born 1971) is a classical violist, conductor, and teacher. As a violist he is active both as a soloist and as member of the Belcea Quartet.

== Biography ==
Chorzelski was born in Warsaw in 1971. According to The New York Times, he describes himself as "the son of two frustrated musicians." In 1988, at the age of 16, Chorzelski played the violin at a ceremony commemorating the 45th anniversary of the Warsaw Ghetto Uprising.

In 1991 he moved to London to study at the Royal College of Music with Grigori Zhislin and later Felix Andrievsky. When he first moved to London, Chorzelski lived down the street from violinist Raymond Cohen, then in his 80s, and regularly attended Cohen's "quartet afternoons." Chorzelski and Corina Belcea-Fisher, the violinist of the Belcea Quartet, were formerly romantically involved, although their breakup did not affect the musical integrity of the group.

== Career ==
In 1992 Chorzelski won the Wronski Solo Violin Competition in Warsaw. He has subsequently performed as a recitalist and concert soloist in Europe as well as making recordings for Polskie Radio and the BBC. In 1996 he joined the Belcea Quartet as their violist. Since Chorzelski joined, the quartet has won prizes at string quartet competitions in Osaka, Bordeaux, Banff, and elsewhere.

The Belcea Quartet's debut recording for EMI won a Gramophone Award in 2001. The quartet has also won the Midem Award, the Diapason d'Or, and the German Critics Chamber Music Recording of the Year Award.

Chorzelski studied conducting with Neil Thomson at the Royal College of Music and Diego Masson at Dartington Summer School.

He is a viola professor at the Guildhall School of Music and Drama in London, where the Belcea Quartet are also in residence. He also teaches viola and chamber music in Poland, Romania, Israel, and elsewhere.

Krzysztof Chorzelski plays a Nicola Amati viola made in 1680 as well as a bespoke contemporary viola made by the Viennese luthier Felix Daniel Rotaru in 2012.
