= Yaakov Rubinstein =

Israeli violinist

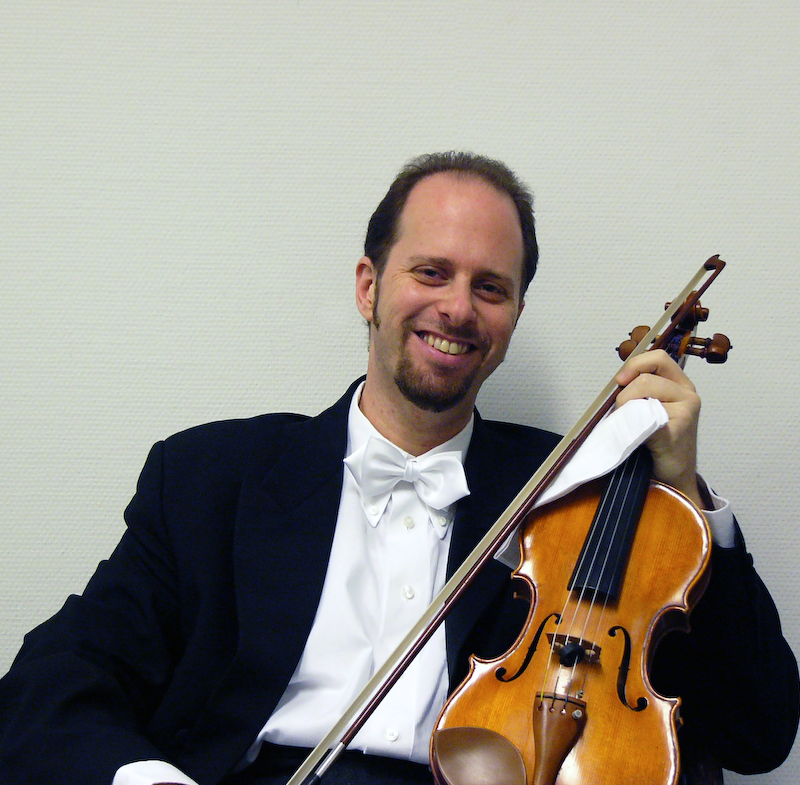
Portrait of Yaakov Rubinstein

Ya’akov Rubinstein (Hebrew: יעקב רובינשטיין) is an Israeli violinist.

He has performed concerts in Europe, Israel, Japan, China and in the United States since he was seven years of age. As a student of the Jerusalem Music Center, he has received lessons from Isaac Stern and Sir Yehudi Menuhin.

After studying with Ilona Feher he completed his studies in Frankfurt am Main with Edith Peinemann and supplemented them at the Manhattan School of Music with Glenn Dicterow, concertmaster of the New York Philharmonic Orchestra.

He has appeared as a soloist with various ensembles, including the Bamberg Symphony Orchestra, the Chamber Orchestra of Mannheim, the Chursaechsische Philharmonic Orchestra, the Philharmonic State Orchestra of Halle and the Youth Orchestra of Basel.

He has performed recitals in Israel, Brazil, France, Denmark, Italy, Switzerland, Germany, and the United States. He has also made many radio, television, and CD recordings.

In addition to many honours and prizes, Ya’akov Rubinstein has received scholarships to the Chautauqua Music Festival, the Manhattan School of Music, and the American Cultural Foundation.

From 1995 to the end of 2009, he was the concertmaster of Bamberg Symphony Orchestra, performing Jewish music and cultivating historical performance practices.

Recently he had performances as a guest with the BR in Munich, WDR Cologne, NDR Hannover, Madrid, Oslo, Bosnia and Herzegovina, Japan, Israel and Brazil.
