= Joseph Phibbs =

British composer

Joseph Phibbs (born 25 April 1974) is an English composer of orchestral, choral and chamber music. He has also composed for theatre, both in the UK and Japan. Since 1998 he has written regularly to commissions for Festivals (including for Cheltenham, Aldeburgh, Presteigne, and Three Choirs), for private sponsors, and for the BBC, which has broadcast premieres of his orchestral and chamber works from the Proms and elsewhere. His works have been given premieres in Europe, the United States and the Far East, and he has received awards, including a British Composer Award (for Rivers to the Sea), and a Library of Congress Serge Koussevitzky Music Foundation Award. Musicians performing his work include Evelyn Glennie, Esa-Pekka Salonen, Leonard Slatkin, Sakari Oramo, Vasily Petrenko, Gianandrea Noseda, and the Belcea Quartet.

== Musical training ==
Joseph Phibbs was born in London, the son of actors Giles Phibbs and Mary Gillingham. A pianist and cellist, he started composing at the age of ten, and from 1988 to 1992 attended the Purcell School for Young Musicians with the assistance of a scholarship from Suffolk County Council. During this time he received tuition in composition from Param Vir. In 1992 he continued his studies at King's College London, where he was taught by Harrison Birtwistle, and where he obtained a BMus degree with a First, taking the Purcell Prize: in 1996 he received an MMus in Composition, having received a British Academy grant.

In that year he was a winner of the BBC Young Composers' Forum, which marked the beginning of a long association with the BBC. A commission in 2001 for his first large-scale orchestral work, In Camera, was premiered at the Barbican by the BBC Symphony Orchestra under Leonard Slatkin; Lumina, for the Last Night of the Proms 2003, was televised from the Royal Albert Hall; and more recently Partita was a joint BBC/Serge Koussevitzky Foundation Award commission. From 1997 to 2001 he studied at Cornell University towards a doctorate of Musical Arts with Steven Stucky, a teacher and later friend who became a major influence on his music. Many of his orchestral and chamber works are now published by Ricordi (part of the Universal Music Publishing Group), with a number of unaccompanied choral works published by Boosey & Hawkes.

In 2024 the Nimbus label released recordings of Phibbs's String Quartets No 2, 3 and 4, performed by the Piatti Quartet. The Piatti Quartet previously recorded the String Quartet No 1 (2014), which was written for them.

== Works ==
See #References for premières.

=== Orchestral ===
- Soirée (1996). (for BBC)
- Dream of a Summer Night (2000). (for Cheltenham Music Festival)
- In Camera (2001). (for BBC)
- Lumina (2003). (for BBC) (Faber Music)
- The Dawn Breakers (2005).
- Shruti (2008), (to Param Vir). (L.S.O. Sound Adventures). (Contemporary Voices BMIC)
- Night Interludes (2011). (for Presteigne festival).
- Rivers to the Sea (2012). (for The Anvil, Basingstoke, with the Philharmonia Orchestra). (Ricordi)
- Partita for Orchestra (2016), dedicated to the memory of Steven Stucky. (for Library of Congress Koussevitzky awards with BBC). (Ricordi)

=== Concertante ===
- Concertino for clarinet and strings (2009), solo clarinet and string orchestra with harp. (for Orchestra of the Swan). (Ricordi)
- Bar Veloce (2011), solo percussion and orchestra. (for Cheltenham Music Festival).
- Towards Purcell (2012), concertante for oboe, horn, harp and orchestra. (for Purcell School's 50th Anniversary). (Ricordi)
- Datcha Savoyarde – Evian Variations (2013), solo cello with orchestra. (for Evian Festival: Homage to Mstislav Rostropovich in the Britten Centenary). (Ricordi)
- Notturno (2013), solo harp with orchestra. (for David Watkins). (Ricordi)
- Clarinet Concerto (2017), for clarinet and orchestra. (commissioned by the Philharmonia Orchestra jointly with Mark van de Wiel and Malmö Live Konserthus). (Ricordi)

=== Instrumental ensemble ===
- Night Dances (1995), for cello, clarinet and piano.
- Cayuga (1999), mixed chamber ensemble. (for Faber Music Millennium Series). (Faber Music)
- Trio Semplice (2000), trio for violin, cello and piano. (for Schubert Ensemble for Chamber Music). (Chamber Music 2000)
- Ritual Songs and Blessings (2002), for oboe, clarinet, horn, violin, viola, cello, piano. (for The Spitalfields Festival, London) (Ricordi)
- La Noche Arrolladora (The Spiralling Night) (2002), harpsichord with wind ensemble. (for BBC)
- The Village of Birds (2006), wind and string septet.
- Split Screen (2006), wind band. (Phillip Scott). (Contemporary Voices BMIC)
- Agea (GEorge vAss) (2007), for string quartet. (Ricordi)
- The Spiralling Night (2007), wind ensemble. (Contemporary Voices BMIC)
- Flex (2007), quartet for flute, violin, cello and piano. (for Royal Philharmonic Society and BBC, for City of London Festival). (Ricordi)
- Cossax (2008), symphonic wind ensemble. (for Aldeburgh Festival). (Ricordi)
- Quartettino (2012), string quartet. (for The Tricycle Theatre). (Ricordi)
- Festival Fanfare (2014), brass quintet. (for Uzerche Festival).
- String Quartet no. 1 (2014). (for The Piatti Quartet, with the Britten-Pears Foundation and the Ralph Vaughan Williams Trust). (Ricordi)
- String Quartet no. 2 (2015). (for Presteigne Festival and Little Missenden Festival). (Ricordi)
- String Quartet no. 3 (2018). (for The Belcea Quartet, co-commissioned by Carnegie Hall).

=== Instrumental duo and solo ===
- Fantasia (1998), duo for violin and piano.
- Tango Rouge (2001), duo for bassoon and piano. (Faber Music)
- Spiraling (2001), duo for violin and marimba. (Contemporary Voices BMIC)
- Fanfares for Harry (2001), duo for clarinet and marimba (to Harrison Birtwistle). (Contemporary Voices BMIC)
- Light Remains (2003), four movements for solo piano. (Contemporary Voices BMIC)
- Crimson Joy (2004), duo for trumpet and piano (to Gareth Flowers). (Contemporary Voices BMIC)
- Personnages (2004), solo for oboe. (for Nicholas Daniel). (Ricordi)
- Notturno (Rose's Lullaby) (2004), duo for violin and piano. (Ricordi)
- Arc de Soleil (2008), duo for clarinet and piano. (for Sarah Williamson, in memory of Christopher Ross 1961–2005). (Ricordi)
- Sonatine (2010), duo for cello and piano. (Ricordi)
- Guitar Suite (2013), solo guitar. (Ricordi)
- Serenade for Two Guitars (2013). (for Duo Guitartes).
- Suite for solo violin (2015), solo violin.
- Letters from Warsaw (2015), duo for viola and piano. (for Krzysztof Chorzelski).

=== Songs and song-cycles ===
- Canticle of the Rose (2005), high soprano with string quartet (Texts: Edith Sitwell). (for Nicholas and Judith Goodison: Goodison Quartet no. 3.) (Shortlisted for Royal Philharmonic Society Chamber music prize). (Ricordi)
- The Silence at the Song's End (2008) Song-cycle, soprano and string quartet (Texts: Nicholas Heiney). (Burnham Market Festival, Norfolk). (Ricordi)
- The Moon's Funeral (2008), Song, counter-tenor and piano (Text: Hilaire Belloc). (for NMC Songbook recording). (Ricordi)
- From Shore to Shore (2011) Song-cycle, guitar and counter-tenor (Texts: Sara Teasdale and Nicholas Heiney). (for James Boyd, with Arts Council England National Lottery Scheme). (Ricordi)
- Pierrot (2011), Song, soprano, recorder and piano (Text: Sara Teasdale).(for 'Antony Hopkins: A Portrait'). (Ricordi)
- Shades of Night (2012), Songs, tenor and piano. (Texts: Trad., and Louis MacNeice). (for Ben Alden). (Ricordi)
- On a Deserted Shore (2012), Song-cycle, baritone & piano (Text: Kathleen Raine). (for Jeremy Huw Williams with the Ralph Vaughan Williams Trust, for the Temenos Academy of Integral Studies). (Ricordi)
- Moon Songs (2013–14), Six songs, soprano, recorder (or flute) and piano. (Texts: Sara Teasdale). (for Pierrot Project).
- Night and Silence – Scena (Act 2, Scene 2) from A Midsummer Night's Dream – (2014), high soprano, tenor, baritone and piano. (for Uzerche Festival).

=== Choral ===
- Ave verum corpus (2003), Soprano with SATB. (Oxford University Press)
- Rainland (2003–04), Choral drama, libretto by Stephen Plaice. (nu:phonics project for 25th Anniversary of East Sussex Music Service). (Contemporary Voices BMIC)
- Levedi, flour of alle thing (St Margaret's Carol) (2004), SATB. (to St Margaret's Church Choir, Ipswich). (Oxford University Press)
- Tenebrae (2005), Cantata. Soprano, chorus, small orchestra and chamber choir. (Texts: David Gascoyne (1916–2001), Henry King, Henry Vaughan and Phineas Fletcher, and from the Latin Mass). (for St Albans Bach Choir). (Oxford University Press)
- Run slowly, horses of the night (2006), Choir and piano.
- Suffolk Chanteys (2008), Chamber choir, wind and percussion (to Sandy Crary). (Britten-Pears Chamber Choir and Aldeburgh Festival). (Contemporary Voices BMIC)
- In excelsis gloria (2008), two-part upper voices, with organ, harp or piano. (for Jenni Wake-Walker). (Boosey & Hawkes)
- Gaudeamus omnes (2009), Introit for the feast of All Saints, SSA, a cappella. (Wells Cathedral girl choristers, Matthew Owens). Rearranged (2010), SSATB, for Exon Singers. (Boosey & Hawkes)
- Sanctus (2010), Chorus, a cappella. (Boosey & Hawkes)
- Modyr, whyt as lyly flour (2010), Carol, SATB, a cappella. (Ricordi)
- Shadows of Sleep (2010), Choral work for trebles, SATB, percussion and piano. (Ricordi)
- Salve Regina (2010), Motet, SSAATTB. (for Exon Singers' Festival, Matthew Owens). (Boosey & Hawkes)
- Choral Songs of Homage (2013), SATB with piano. (Texts: Trad., Henry Vaughan and Thomas Heywood). (for Aldeburgh Music Club for the Britten Centenary).
- Lullay, lullay, thou lytil child (2014), SATB soloists with mixed choir SSATB, a cappella. (for the Fairhaven Singers, Ralph Woodward). (Boosey & Hawkes)
- Missa Brevis (2016), Ordinary of Latin Mass, unaccompanied upper voices in 3 parts. (Boosey & Hawkes)
- Night Songs (2019), 3 track EP recorded with London Voices. (Chromium Music Group)

=== Chamber opera ===
- Juliana (2018). (Libretto by Laurie Slade, after Miss Julie by August Strindberg).

== Selected Sources ==
- Official website
- Composer's video commentary on The Canticle of the Rose on YouTube
- Interview (James Boyd), International Bath Music Festival
- Interview: 'Joseph Phibbs: Rivers to the Sea (New Commission)', Philharmonia Orchestra video, 2012 (Vimeo)
- Interview: Gavin Dixon, 'A breath of fresh air: An interview with Sarah Williamson and Joseph Phibbs', Seen and Heard International
- Interview August 2011, in A. Palmer, Encounters with British Composers (Boydell Press, Woodbridge 2015), pp. xxi, 381–391
- Interview with Joseph Phibbs, Beethovenfest Bonn 2012
- Krzysztof Chorzelski commissions Letters from Warsaw, The Amati Magazine 153
- A. Whittall: "From post-tonal to postmodern? Two string quartets by Joseph Phibbs", Musical Times, Autumn 2016
- 'The clarinet as true protagonist' Interview feature: Joseph Phibbs and Mark van de Wiel Bachtrack, October 2017
- Joseph Phibbs and Laurie Slade talk about Juliana, 2018 (Vimeo)
- Sound and Music British Music Collection
