= Budapest Quartet (1886) =

Hungarian string quartet

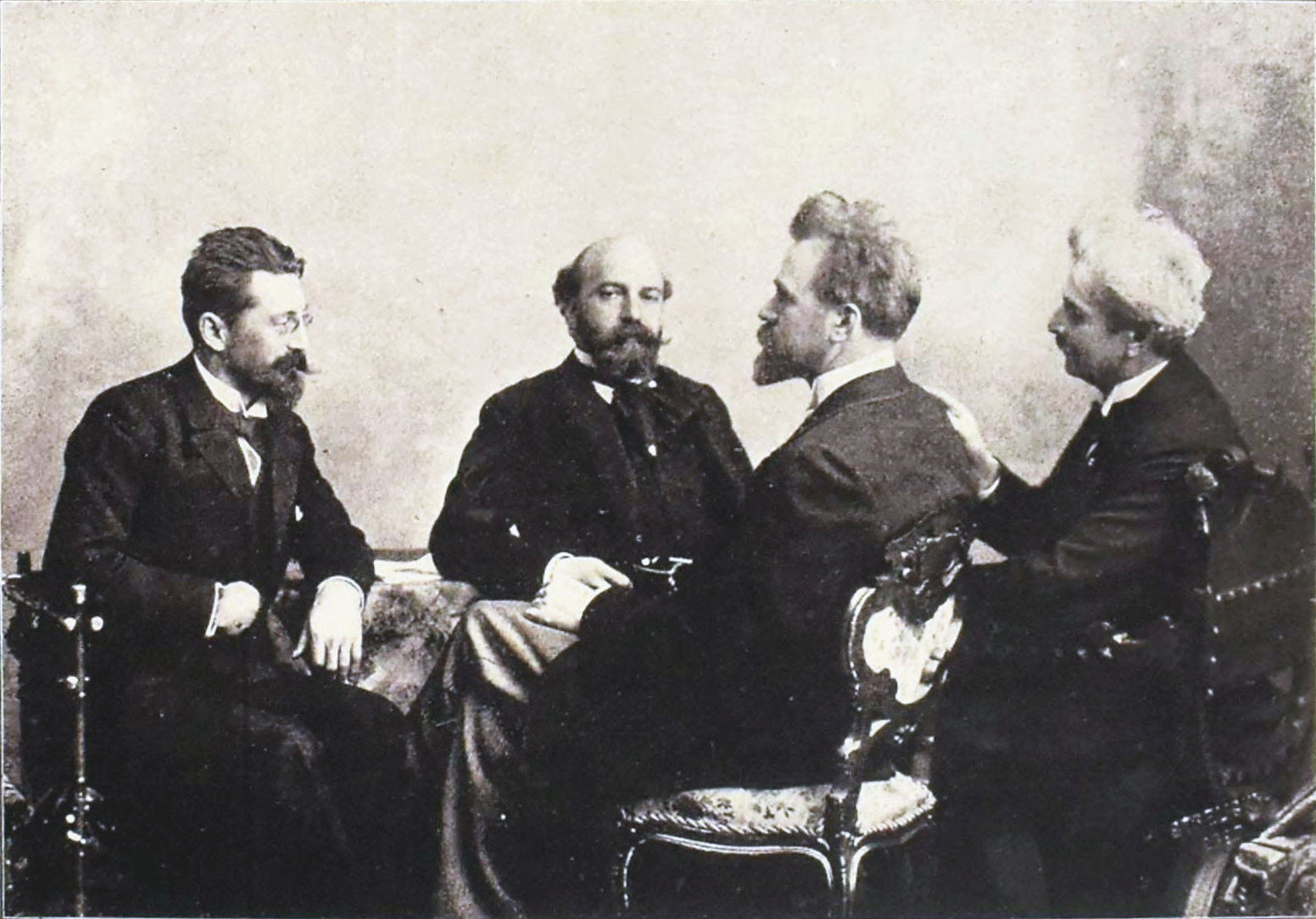
The members of the Budapest Quartet in 1888: Josef Waldbauer, Victor von Herzfeld, Jenő Hubay and David Popper

The Budapest Quartet was a string quartet established in Budapest in 1886 by Jenő Hubay and David Popper.

Johannes Brahms performed with the quartet and thought it was the best he had heard.

This quartet went under a variety of names. Outside Hungary, it was usually called "Quartet Hubay-Popper". Within Hungary it was called "Hungarian Quartet" or "Budapest Quartet". This was because Hungarians were fiercely patriotic.

They performed for twenty-seven years.

== Composition ==
The quartet's initial composition was:

- Jenő Hubay, first violin
- Viktor Herzfeld, second violin
- Bram Eldering, viola
- David Popper, cello

Herzfeld played in 1886-1889 and 1897-1899. Wilhelm Grünfeld (concertmaster of Budapest Opera) played in 1888 the 2nd violin and 1889 József Bloch (later a teacher at the Music Academy). After then, two students of Hubay played the 2nd violin: in 1894 János Farkas and from 1895 Rudolf Kemény. Elderling left the quartet soon. Violist from 1888 was Josef Waldbauer and from 1898 Gustav Szerémi.
