= American String Teachers Association =

The American String Teachers Association (ASTA) is a professional organization for bowed string music teachers based in the United States. It is the largest organization in the U.S. for string teachers. ASTA serves teachers and students in all areas of stringed instruments from kindergarten to the collegiate level, private teachers, performers, institutions of higher learning and business partners serving all instruments, accessories, sheet music and more for the teachers, students and players of stringed instruments.

Another key goal of the association is providing learning opportunities to play bowed string instruments for the next generation of American students and to place those students into orchestras as they grow more proficient. Besides advocating for string instrument study at all age and proficiency levels in various frameworks, ASTA provides professional development, online and print resources for pedagogical content, scholarly publications, music advocate resources, student-level competitions and evaluation programs, a career center, community connections through state chapters, and other resources.

== History ==
Originally two separate groups, ASTA and NSOA (National School Orchestra Association), the whole organization is now referred to as "ASTA". The organization is currently led by Dr. Rebecca MacLeod from University of North Carolina at Greensboro. The immediate past president is Dr. Kristen Pellegrino at University of Texas at San Antonio.

== ASTA string curriculum ==
In 2011, ASTA published its first national model curriculum intended to be used as one of the standards and benchmarks for Kindergarten–grade 12 strings and orchestra programs thanks to Stephen Benham. The curriculum can be used as a reference by teachers and can be presented to administrators and parents. It includes the teachings of Shinichi Suzuki, Paul Rolland, Kató Havas, and others, and is available in both print and electronic formats.

== National awards ==
The following awards are given by ASTA:

- Artist Teacher Award is given to an artist/pedagogue of renowned stature from within North America.
- Elizabeth A. H. Green School Educator Award is given annually to a school string teacher with a current and distinguished career in a school orchestral setting.
- Isaac Stern International Award is given to an artist teacher whose identity need not be primarily within the American scene. (given periodically)
- Paul Rolland Lifetime Achievement Award is given to an individual of renowned stature whose identity need not be primarily with the American scene. (given periodically)
- Student Chapter Award is given to an ASTA student chapter for exemplary promotion of strings in and around the university community.
- Traugott Rohner Leadership in the Music Industry Award is given to a string industry leader whose identity is primarily from within North America. (given periodically)
- Orchestra Repertoire and Literature Award is given periodically at the discretion of the ASTA National Board and recognizes a composer or arranger who has made significant contributions to the orchestra literature (string and/or full) and/or pedagogical materials in service of string education.

== ASTA National Conference ==
Each year, ASTA holds its national conference, the only national conference focused solely on strings and the string community.

- The National Orchestra Festival, held at the conference, features performances by orchestras from around the United States. The groups compete in three divisions: Middle School, High School, and Youth Orchestra. There is a Grand Champion for the Public School Division and one from the Private School/Youth Orchestra Division.

== National String Project Consortium ==
The String Projects began in 1948 to provide programs in universities for string-instrument instruction for young children. The first project was started at the University of Texas. Former ASTA President Robert Jesselson led an expansion to other universities, based on the model at the University of South Carolina, which included undergraduate students. These projects continued for decades and gained national attention. The National String Project Consortium (NSPC) was formed in 1998 to address the shortage of string-instrument teachers in public schools in the United States. By 2007, NSPC, having expanded to 24 sites, became independent from ASTA. It currently includes 35 string projects at universities around the United States.

== See also ==
- Dorothy DeLay
