= Hagai Shaham =

Israeli violinist (born 1966)

Hagai Shaham חגי שחם
- Born: July 8, 1966 (age 59); Haifa, Israel
- Genres: Classical
- Occupations: Violinist, Violin teacher
- Labels: Hyperion Records; Naxos Records
- Website: www.hagaishaham.com

Hagai Shaham (Hebrew: חגי שחם; born July 8, 1966) is an Israeli violin virtuoso. He began studying the violin at the age of six and was the last student of the late Professor Ilona Feher. He is also a violin teacher, a professor at the Buchmann-Mehta School of Music (formerly the Samuel Rubin Israel Academy of Music), in the Faculty of Arts at Tel Aviv University, and an artist-in-residence at Stony Brook University.

== Performing career ==
As a soloist he has performed with many of the world's major orchestras, including the English Chamber Orchestra, BBC Philharmonic, Royal Liverpool Philharmonic, RTÉ National Symphony Orchestra of Ireland, Belgian National Orchestra, Orchestre Symphonique Francais, National Taiwan Symphony Orchestra, Southwest German Radio Symphony Orchestra, Slovak Philharmonic, and the Israel Philharmonic Orchestra under Zubin Mehta. In 1985 he was invited to join Isaac Stern and Pinchas Zukerman in a gala concert at Carnegie Hall, following which Zubin Mehta invited him to perform Brahms' Double Concerto at Carnegie Hall. In 2006 Hagai Shaham was again invited by Zubin Mehta to play Brahms' Double Concerto, together with cellist Mischa Maisky, to celebrate the 70th Anniversary of the Israel Philharmonic Orchestra.

He also performs as a recitalist and appears in chamber music performances. He regularly tours throughout Europe, and North and South America, performing at international recital series and festivals.

== Recording ==
He has recorded on the Biddulph, Hyperion Records, Avie, Naxos Records, Talent, and more labels, music of Achron, Bloch, Brahms, Hubay, Grieg, Mozart, and more.

=== The forgotten work of Joseph Achron ===
Hagai Shaham has found unpublished compositions of Joseph Achron (1886–1943) at the National Library at the Hebrew University of Jerusalem, and performed and recorded them (short pieces, some appearing for the first time). A CD was published in 1997 by Biddulph Recordings, London. An expanded version of this CD, with Achron's complete suites for violin and piano (2 CDs) has been published by Hyperion in 2012.

Some quotes from reviews:

"The quasi-mystical intensity of Shaham's reading throbs like Heifetz's with the ecstasy of ritual declamation. His off-the-string bowings strike sparks, and his rapid passage work glitters; but ... he also communicates the mystery of more somber numbers. His powerful tone ... intensifies the effect of both the soaring Romantic and the insinuating Hebrew passages ... an impressive a technique as anyone except Heifetz could bring" - Fanfare Magazine

"An exceptionally welcome release ... outstanding lyric quality ... Through the richness of his tone, superior vibrato usage, expressiveness of phrasing and top-drawer facility, he fulfills his potential in striking fashion. It is a treat to hear such tonally satisfying violin playing when commonplace sound, even among accomplished artists, is so prevalent" - The Strad Magazine

"Shaham's approach achieves and ideal balance between expressive colouring ... and collaborative restraint. Hagai Shaham inhabits the same stylistic world as his great forebears. He obviously respects past masters, and yet his playing eschews specific imitation (in his handling of those pieces recorded by Heifetz, Elman, Kaufman and others)" - Gramophone Magazine

About half of Joseph Achron's compositions (over 100 total) were unpublished in his lifetime (1886–1943). By sheer luck the manuscripts have been saved from disposal and arrived in the Hebrew University (see more in the CD's elaborated notes, in English, Hebrew, and Yiddish).

== Teaching ==
Combined with his career as a performer Hagai Shaham teaches violin playing and conducts master classes, primarily in Israel and Europe. He was a faculty member of the Jerusalem Academy of Music and Dance. In 2007, he joined the music faculty at the renowned Thornton School of Music at the University of Southern California (USC; where Jascha Heifetz has taught violin playing). Since 2009 he has been a professor at the Buchmann-Mehta School of Music (formerly the Samuel Rubin Israel Academy of Music), in the Faculty of Arts at Tel Aviv University. He is currently teaching at Stony Brook University in Long Island, NY. In the summer months, he teaches at the Heifetz International Music Institute in Staunton, VA.

Shaham is online Master Teacher at iClassical Academy with whom he has recorded several online Masterclasses.

== Awards ==
In September 1990, Hagai Shaham and his duo partner Arnon Erez won the first prize at the ARD International Music Competition in Munich in the Violin-Piano duo category, the first competitors to be awarded this coveted first prize since 1971. His other awards include first prizes at the Ilona Kornhouser competition, the Israeli Broadcasting Authority Young Artist competition, The Tel-Aviv Rubin Academy competition, four Clairmont Awards, and annual scholarship from the American-Israel Cultural Foundation.

== Personal life ==
Hagai Shaham is a co-founder of the Ilona Feher Foundation.

He is married and has three children. Mezzo-soprano Rinat Shaham is his sister.
