= Shmuel Ashkenasi =

Israeli violinist (born 1941)

Shmuel Ashkenasi שמואל אשכנזי
- Born: January 11, 1941 (age 85); Tel Aviv, Israel
- Genres: Classical
- Occupations: Violinist; Teacher
- Instrument: Violin
- Education: Musical Academy of Tel-Aviv, Curtis Institute of Music

Shmuel Ashkenasi (Hebrew: שמואל אשכנזי; born January 11, 1941) is an Israeli violinist and teacher.

== Biography ==
Born in Tel Aviv on January 11, 1941, he began his musical training at the Musical Academy of Tel-Aviv studying with legendary pedagogue Ilona Feher, the teacher of such violinists as Pinchas Zukerman and Shlomo Mintz. He arrived in the United States while still young and studied with Efrem Zimbalist at the Curtis Institute of Music in Philadelphia, Pennsylvania.

== Career ==
Ashkenasi won the Young Concert Artists International Auditions in 1961 and in 1962 captured top prizes at the Tchaikovsky Competition in Moscow, Russia, the Merriweather Post Competition in Washington, D.C., and the Queen Elisabeth Music Competition in Belgium. As a soloist, he has toured the Soviet Union twice and plays concerts every year throughout Europe, Israel and the Far East. He has performed with American orchestras such as the Philadelphia Orchestra, Boston Symphony, Chicago Symphony, National Symphony, Los Angeles Philharmonic, Atlanta Symphony, Vienna Symphony, Royal Philharmonic, and the orchestras of Berlin, Hamburg, Munich, Zurich, Rotterdam, Geneva and Stockholm.

In 1974, he was a soloist with the Naumburg Orchestral Concerts, in the Naumburg Bandshell, Central Park, in the summer series.

Among his solo recordings are the Paganini Violin Concertos No. 1 and No. 2 with the Vienna Symphony on the Deutsche Grammophon label, the two Beethoven Romances, and the Mozart A Major Concerto.

== Vermeer Quartet ==
In 1969, Ashkenasi was chosen to form a string quartet by then-chair of the Department of Music at Northern Illinois University, Stan Ballinger. Consequently, auditions were held during the next year to establish the esteemed Vermeer Quartet. Mr. Ashkenasi remained as its first violinist throughout the quartet's career. The Vermeer Quartet held residencies at Northern Illinois University and at the Royal Northern College of Music in Manchester, England. Its discography includes works of Beethoven, Bartók, Brahms, Dvořák, Haydn (a Grammy-nominated recording of the Seven Last Words of Christ produced by the violist of the quartet, Richard Young), Schubert, Schnittke, Tchaikovsky, and Verdi.

== Pedagogue ==
Ashkenasi is also a noted pedagogue, currently holding the posts of Professor of Violin at Bard College Conservatory of Music and the Curtis Institute of Music. His students include Viviane Hagner, Gwendolyn Masin and Gerhard Schulz.
