= Arnon Erez =

Israeli musician

Arnon Erez (Hebrew: ארנון ארז) is an acclaimed Israeli pianist and chamber musician, and a piano professor at the Buchmann-Mehta School of Music (formerly the Samuel Rubin Israel Academy of Music), in the Faculty of Arts at Tel Aviv University.

== Background and studies ==
Arnon Erez studied the piano with Mrs. Hana Shalgi, Prof. Michael Boguslavski and Prof. Arie Vardi. A graduate of the Rubin Academy of Music, Tel Aviv University later renamed The Buchmann-Mehta School of Music, he pursued further chamber music studies in the United States with the Guarneri Quartet. He was awarded scholarships for excellence from the America Israel Cultural Foundation.

His international career began in 1990, after winning—together with his duo partner Hagai Shaham—the (German Radio) ARD International Music Competition in Munich, a prize which had not been awarded in the violin-piano duo category since 1971. Other competitions he has won include first prize in the François Shapira competition for outstanding young classical musicians in Israel, the Tel Aviv Music Academy competition, and the Clermont award.

== Performing career ==
As a concert pianist, Arnon Erez has performed in numerous major concert halls, including Carnegie Hall, New York; Beethoven Halle, Bonn; Alte Oper, Frankfurt; Herkulessaal, Munich; Musikverein, Vienna; the New Auditorium du Louvre in Paris; and London’s Wigmore Hall. Arnon Erez has appeared in major festivals around the world, and as a soloist he has performed with various orchestras including the Israel Philharmonic Orchestra, the SWF Symphony Orchestra, the Haifa Symphony Orchestra and the Banff Festival Orchestra.

== Recording career ==
Arnon Erez has recorded for radio and television stations in Germany, Austria, the Netherlands, Israel, Turkey, Mexico, and France. He has recorded CDs under several labels including Hyperion, Biddulph Recordings, Talent, Nimbus and the American company CRI.

== Teaching activity ==
Arnon Erez currently teaches at the Buchmann-Mehta School of Music (formerly the Samuel Rubin Israel Academy of Music), in the Faculty of Arts at Tel Aviv University.
