= Victor von Herzfeld =

Hungarian musician (1856–1919)

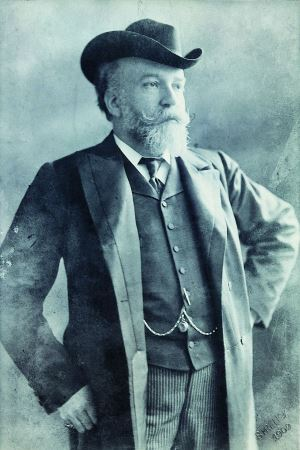
- Born: October 8, 1856; Pressburg, Austria-Hungary
- Died: February 19, 1919 (aged 62); Budapest, Hungary
- Occupations: Violinist, composer

Victor Emmerich Ritter von Herzfeld (October 8, 1856 – February 19, 1919) was a Hungarian violinist and composer.

Born in Pressburg (now Bratislava), Herzfeld studied law at the University of Vienna and music at the Music Academy of Vienna where he won first prize for both composition and violin playing. In 1884, he was awarded the Beethoven Prize of the Gesellschaft der Musikfreunde (Society of the Friends of Music). He studied in Berlin with Eduard Grell and in 1886 went to Budapest as professor in the Music Academy. He was second violin in the original Budapest Quartet established by David Popper and Jenő Hubay. Ernst von Dohnányi dedicated his Sonata in C♯ minor for Violin and Piano, Op. 21 (1912) to Herzfeld. While serving as the music critic of the Neue Pester Journal, he wrote a negative review of his friend and colleague Gustav Mahler's First Symphony. He is the author of a 1915 article on Robert Volkmann. He died in Budapest and was buried there at the Kerepesi Cemetery.
