= BBC Scottish Symphony Orchestra =

Orchestra based in Glasgow, Scotland

- Orchestra
- The BBC Scottish Symphony Orchestra's logo
- Short name: BBC SSO
- Founded: 1935 (91 years ago)
- Location: Glasgow, Scotland
- Concert hall: Glasgow City Halls
- Principal conductor: Ryan Wigglesworth
- Website: www.bbc.co.uk/bbcsso

The BBC Scottish Symphony Orchestra (BBC SSO) is a Scottish broadcasting symphony orchestra based in Glasgow. One of five full-time orchestras maintained by the British Broadcasting Corporation (BBC), it is the oldest full-time professional radio orchestra in Scotland. The orchestra is based at City Halls in Glasgow.

== History ==
The BBC opened its Edinburgh studio in 1930, and decided to form its own full-time Scottish orchestra to complement BBC orchestras already established in London, Manchester and Wales. The BBC Scottish Orchestra was established as Scotland's first full-time orchestra on 1 December 1935 by the BBC's first head of music in Scotland, composer and conductor Ian Whyte.

In 1938, the orchestra moved into its purpose-built home at Studio One, in the newly opened Glasgow Studios, at Broadcasting House in Queen Margaret Drive. The newly formed Scottish Variety Orchestra (which became the BBC Scottish Radio Orchestra in 1967) occupied Studio Two.

As one of the BBC's many ensembles, the orchestra led a busy though sheltered life, broadcasting live at least five times a week from its studio and only occasionally allowed out. Throughout the war, the orchestra fulfilled 30 hours of broadcasts per week on the BBC Home and World Services. This meant live performances at any time of day or night, often broadcasting live to Latin America at half past one in the morning.

By the end of the war, during which the orchestra had been expanded in numbers, Whyte had brought it to a standard considered good enough for the newly established Edinburgh Festival, at which the orchestra has appeared regularly since 1948.

Through the 1950s and 1960s, live studio broadcasting still dominated the orchestra's schedule, and there was little time in its schedule for public performances. This situation changed after Norman Del Mar's advent as Principal Conductor in 1960. He led the BBC Scottish Orchestra's first visit to The Proms in 1962, and through his efforts the orchestra was further expanded, which led to a change of its title to the "BBC Scottish Symphony Orchestra" the following year. Del Mar's earliest projects included the UK premiere of Stockhausen's Gruppen, performed jointly in Glasgow with the Scottish National Orchestra, and it was his interest in contemporary music that laid the foundation for the BBC SSO's long-standing commitment to new work. The BBC SSO has continued to perform the work of Scottish composers in Scotland and at The Proms, such as the 1990 Premiere of James MacMillan's The Confession of Isobel Gowdie.

The last twenty years has seen the gradual emergence of the BBC SSO as a fully fledged 'public' orchestra, with foreign touring, commercial recordings and concerts all over the world consolidating its position as one of the cornerstones of Scottish musical life. The BBC SSO appears annually in such festivals as the BBC Proms, the Edinburgh International Festival, the Cheltenham, Huddersfield Contemporary Music Festival and the St Magnus Festival in Orkney. At the beginning of January 2006, the BBC SSO moved from Broadcasting House, Glasgow to the fully refurbished City Halls in Glasgow.

From 2003 to 2009, the orchestra's Chief Conductor was Israeli-born Ilan Volkov, the youngest-ever chief conductor of any BBC orchestra. In October 2007, the orchestra announced the appointment of Edinburgh born Donald Runnicles as its Chief Conductor in September 2009. Volkov took the title of principal guest conductor BBC SSO as of the 2009–2010 season, in parallel with the advent of Runnicles as chief conductor. In September 2011, the BBC SSO announced the extension of Runnicles' contract as chief conductor through 2015. In October 2014, the BBC SSO reported the scheduled conclusion of Runnicles' tenure as chief conductor in September 2016, at which time he took the title of conductor emeritus with the orchestra. In 2012, Laura Samuel became leader of the orchestra.

In March 2015, the orchestra announced the appointment of Thomas Dausgaard as its 11th chief conductor, effective with the 2016–2017 season. In January 2018, the BBC SSO announced the extension of Dausgaard's contract as chief conductor through the 2021–2022 season. Dausgaard concluded his chief conductorship of the BBC SSO at the close of the 2021–2022 season. In February 2022, the BBC SSO announced the appointment of Ryan Wigglesworth as its next chief conductor, effective September 2022. Wigglesworth is scheduled to conclude his tenure with the BBC SSO at the close of the 2026–2027 season.

In 2018, Antony Hermus first guest-conducted the BBC SSO. In June 2026, the BBC SSO announced the appointment of Hermus as its next chief conductor, effective in September 2027.

The Royal Philharmonic Society presented the BBC SSO with its award for Best Orchestra in 2002, and its then-chief conductor Ilan Volkov with the prize for Best Young Artist in 2004. In March 2014, the orchestra made its first trip to India, covering the cities of Chennai, Mumbai and New Delhi.

== Chief conductors and principal conductors ==
- Guy Warrack (1935–1946)
- Ian Whyte (1946–1960)
- Norman Del Mar (1960–1965)
- James Loughran (1965–1971)
- Christopher Seaman (1971–1977)
- Karl Anton Rickenbacher (1978–1980)
- Jerzy Maksymiuk (1983–1993)
- Osmo Vänskä (1996–2002)
- Ilan Volkov (2003–2009)
- Donald Runnicles (2009–2016)
- Thomas Dausgaard (2016–2022)
- Ryan Wigglesworth (2022–present)
- Antony Hermus (designate, effective 2027)

=== Chief guest conductors and principal guest conductors ===
- Sir Charles Groves (1981–1983)
- Vernon Handley (1983–1985)
- George Hurst (1986–1989)
- Takuo Yuasa (1989–1992)
- Ilan Volkov (2009–2024)
- Delyana Lazarova (2025–present)

== Associate principal conductors ==
- Martyn Brabbins (1996–2005)

=== Associate guest conductors ===
- Stefan Solyom (2006–2009)
- Andrew Manze (2010–2014)
- John Wilson (2016–present)

== Assistant and associate conductors ==
- Robert Irving (1946–1948)
- Harry Platts (1948–1949)
- John Hopkins (1949–1951)
- Alexander Gibson (1952–1954)
- Gerald Gentry (1954–1956)
- Colin Davis (1957–1959)
- Bryden Thomson (1959–1960)
- James Lockhart (1960–1962)
- Bernard Keeffe (1962–1964)
- Graham Treacher (1964–1967)
- Christopher Seaman (1968–1970)
- Andrew Davis (1970–1972)
- Christopher Adey (1973–1976)
- Simon Rattle (1977–1980)
- Nicholas Kraemer (1983–1985)
- Christopher Bell (1989–1991)
- Martyn Brabbins (1992–1996)

== Affiliated composers ==
- Tan Dun (Associate Composer/Conductor, 1994–1998)
- Stuart MacRae (Composer in Association, 1999–2003)
- Anna Meredith (Composer in Residence, 2004–2006)
- Jonathan Harvey (Composer-in-Association, 2005–2007)
- Matthias Pintscher (Artist-in-Association, 2010–2018)

== Recordings ==
As well as its regular live broadcasts and recordings for the BBC, and recordings for BBC Music Magazine, the BBC Scottish Symphony Orchestra has recorded 98 commercial CDs for labels including BIS, NMC and Hyperion, with whom it has a long association. The orchestra has gathered 4 Gramophone Awards and a Grammy nomination for its commercial recordings.

- Jonathan Harvey: Body Mandala – Anu Komsi (soprano), BBC Scottish Symphony Orchestra, Ilan Volkov (conductor). Label: NMC
- English Orchestral Songs – Christopher Maltman (baritone), BBC Scottish Symphony Orchestra, Martyn Brabbins (conductor), Adrian Adlam (leader). Label: Hyperion.

== See also ==
- Broadcast Orchestra
- BBC Orchestras and Singers
