= Rudolf Kemény =

Hungarian violinist

Rezső (Rudolf) Kemény (March 21, 1871 Nyíregyháza — July 7, 1945) was a Hungarian violinist and violin teacher.

Kemény studied violin with Alois Gobbi at the National Conservatory and with Jenő Hubay at the Musical Academy in Budapest and with Joseph Joachim in Berlin. Since 1890 he worked in Königsberg as conductor and was a teacher at the Königsberg Conservatory and was appointed 1897 to Professor and co-director. In the autumn of 1898 he returned to Budapest and was a violin teacher at the Music Academy. In the years 1898–1934 he was on the concert tour. He was from 1899 a member (2nd violin) of Hubay-Popper Quartet. In or shortly before 1902 he founded his own Kemény-Schiffer quartet, with Adolf Schiffer.

Jenő Hubay dedicated his Scherzo Diabolique op. 51 No 5 to Kemény.

== Sources ==
- Ágnes Kenyeres (ed.): Kemény Rezső in: Magyar Életrajzi Lexikon (Hungarian Music Encyclopedia)
- Károly Kristóf, Péter Ujvári (ed.): Kemény Rezső in: Magyar zsidó lexikon (Hungarian Jewish Encyclopedia of Music), Budapest 1929, p. 461
