= Edith Peinemann =

German violinist (1937–2023)

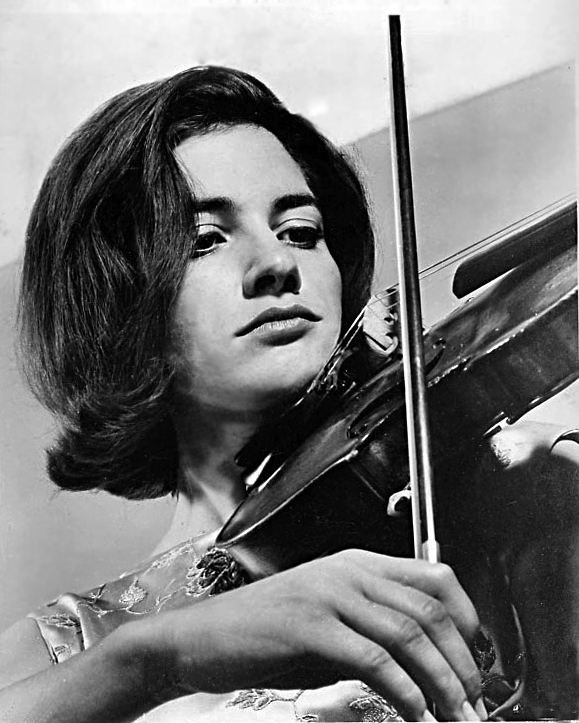
- Peinemann in the 1960s
- Born: 3 March 1937; Mainz, Germany
- Died: 24 February 2023 (aged 85)
- Occupations: violinist, professor

Edith Peinemann (3 March 1937 – 25 February 2023) was an internationally recognized German violinist and professor of violin. At age nineteen she won the ARD International Music Competition in Munich, and made her U.S. debut as soloist in 1962 with Max Rudolf, after which she became a protégée of George Szell. In 2005 she became president of the European String Teachers Association.

She made few recordings during her career, making her a "cult figure among violinists." Peinemann is considered one of the world's "finest violinists of her time."

== Career ==
Peinemann was born in Mainz, Germany, the daughter of a Mainz orchestra's concertmaster, with whom she learned violin until the age of fourteen. She later studied with Max Rostal in London, and would fulfill the "prophecy of violinist Yehudi Menuhin who, upon hearing her play when she was 19, predicted a 'brilliant and successful career'."

In 1956, she won the first prize in the International Competition of the German Radio in Munich. At that competition, conductor William Steinberg, who was among the judges, invited her to make her American debut with the Pittsburgh Symphony Orchestra, which she did in 1962. Word spread among Germany's conductors, such as Max Rudolf, about her achievements in the U.S., including her Cleveland debut where she played Dvorak's Violin Concerto. Reviews of that concert were positive, with Carl Apone noting that Dvořák's concerto was "a proving ground on which to separate the men from the boys:"

By the time Germany's Edith Peinemann, 24, had reached the end of the first movement, it was obvious that this serious musician had the situation well in hand. . . When Miss Peinemann had completed her evening's work, she was called back for six curtain calls . . some of the men in the audience, as impressed with her physical beauty as with her musical talent. . . The orchestra violinists raved about her playing in a manner not often heard here and swarmed around to congratulate her.

Hungarian-born American conductor and composer George Szell saw her perform in Cleveland, invited her to perform with him at the De Doelen in Rotterdam in 1963, the Berlin Philharmonic, and the New York Philharmonic, and often gave her coaching before concerts. She began to call him "Uncle George," as they developed a close friendship during that period. Szell made a special attempt to obtain private funds from wealthy donors to buy her a violin of finer quality, which he helped her select. Peinemann recalls his assistance:

[Szell] was in Zurich and I had my violin dealer from Bern who had a lot of fine instruments come to Zurich. We went to the concert hall there and Mr. Szell went into the audience and I played to him five fine violins: two Guarneri, three Stradivari. And he chose the one I have now, a Guarneri. . . . He was marvelous to young musicians.

She performed as a soloist with the Chicago Symphony Orchestra at the start of their new year in 1966, and with the Atlanta Symphony in January, with Robert Mann conducting.

In 1967, after working with Szell to perfect a performance of Bartok's Violin Concerto No. 2 along with the Beethoven concerto, he asked her to perform Mozart's Violin Concerto No. 3, as Mozart, notes historian Michael Charry, was "a composer he reserved for his favorite and most mature artists.

Amongst her numerous engagements, touring Southern Africa was a favourite. She was acclaimed and especially popular there, and did concert tours of that region five times (1964, 69, 74, 75, 78).

== Later career ==
Peinemann has continued her career over the following decades, becoming a professor of music at Frankfurt University of Music and Performing Arts from 1976, and is listed among their notable teachers, having taught other notable violinists, including Yaakov Rubinstein. She performed as soloist with the Cleveland Orchestra in July 1987. Some of her other students have included Veronica Kröner, and Harriet Cohen.

Music professor Dr. David C. F. Wright, in an article acknowledging her contributions, notes that she made her American debut at Carnegie Hall in 1965. In later years, she gave master classes at the Cleveland Institute of Music, Indiana University at Bloomington, Kusatsu Festival in Japan and the Lucerne Conservatory. In 2005, she was the international president of the European String Teachers Association (ESTA). Wright offers his impression of her abilities:

Her recordings are few. There is the Dvořák Concerto, Prokofiev 1 and a sensational performance of the Berg conducted by Rudolf Kempe. I have heard and marvelled at her solo Bach and Bruch's first concerto with the BBC Philharmonic ... Along with Ginette Neveu, she is the best.

Critic Roger Hecht described her recorded performance with Kempe:

Edith Peinemann was a cult figure among violinists, and it is easy to hear why ... it is clear that she saw herself as a member of an ensemble rather than a virtuoso soloist. Her warm tone and singing style fit Kempe's approach well. The interplay between violin and orchestra is a pleasure to hear from the opening bars which actually glisten.

== Discography (partial) ==
Source: Discogs.com

- Pfitzner Violin Concerto, (1959)

Vienna Festival – Edith Peinemann – Bamberg Symphony – Joseph Keilberth – Past Daily Weekend Gramophone

- Konzert Für Violine Und Orchester a-moll Op. 53 / Tzigane (1966)

Anton Dvořák* / Maurice Ravel - Edith Peinemann, Peter Maag, Tschechische Philharmonie, Prag* - Deutsche Grammophon

- J. S. Bach "Violin Concerto No 2, (date unknown)

Violin Concerto No 2 in E Major, BWV 1042 by Johann Sebastian Bach, 2. Movement "Adagio"

- Symphonieorchester Des Bayerischen Rundfunks (2004),

Günter Wand, Igor Strawinsky*, Sergej Prokofiew*, Edith Peinemann, * - Günter Wand-Edition Volume 3 (CD) Profil Medien GmbH PH04056

- Rudolf Kempe, Edith Peinemann (2007),

Tippett, Berg, Janáček (CD, Album, RM), BBC, BBCL 4215-2, 2007

- Brahms (date unknown)

Edith Peinemann, Jörg Demus - Sonate Op. 100 A-Dur / Sonate Op. 108 D-Moll (LP) Darnok DF 2032

- Brahms (date unknown)

Edith Peinemann, Jörg Demus - Sonate Op. 78 G-dur / Sonatensatze (LP) Darnok DF 2033

- Brahms, Busoni & Mozart: Violin Sonatas (2014)
