= Anna Karenina (Hubay) =

Karenina Anna (also known as Anna Karenina in German version), Op. 112, is a Hungarian-language opera by Jenő Hubay composed in 1914–1918 that premiered 1923 in Budapest. The libretto by Sándor Góth and Andor Gábor was based not directly on Tolstoy's novel but on a popular French stage adaptation of 1907 by Edmond Guiraud.

== Performances ==
The opera was revived - and filmed - in the German version at Staatstheater Braunschweig in 2014.
