= Imre Waldbauer =

Hungarian violinist

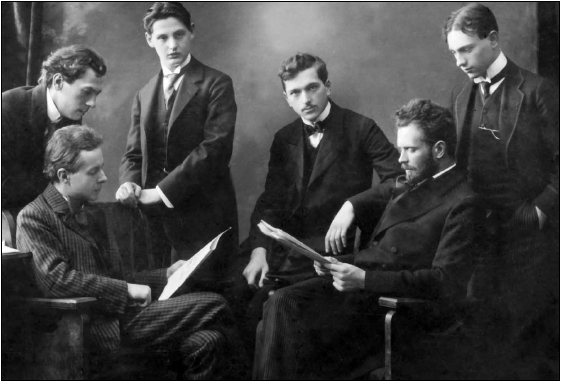
Aladár Székely: The Waldbauer-Quartet with Imre Waldbauer (2. from left) and seated: Bartók and Kodály (1910)

Imre Waldbauer (3 March 1892 – 5 December 1952) was a Hungarian violinist and music teacher.

Born in Budapest as Josef Waldbauer's son, Waldbauer was a student of Jenő Hubay. He lived in Hungary until 1945, worked as a violin and viola teacher at the Music Academy in Budapest and, together with the cellist Jenő Kerpely, founded the Waldbauer-Kerpely-Quartett ("Hungarian String Quartet") in 1910, which was active until 1945. A friend of Béla Bartók, Zoltán Kodály and Ernst von Dohnányi, he premiered many of their violin works and was an important interpreter of their chamber music with his quartet. In 1945 he moved to the US, where he taught at the University of Iowa until his death. Among his pupils were Paul Rolland, Kató Havas, Vilmos Tátrai, Robert Gerle and Dénes Zsigmondy.

Waldbauer died in Iowa City at age 60.

== Sources ==
- Julia Quick: The Pedagogy of Imre Waldbauer, First Violinist of the Hungarian String Quartet, Abstract
- Violinists’ History Map
