= Zsigmond Vincze =

Hungarian pianist, conductor and composer

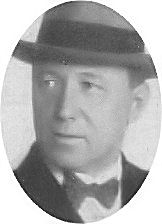
Zsigmond Vincze

Zsigmond Vincze (1 July 1874, Zombor – 30 June 1935, Budapest) was a Hungarian pianist, conductor and composer who wrote several very successful operettas.

== Life and career ==
After having trained in Budapest, Vincze became conductor of the Király Szinház in the city, and later was musical director of the opera in Debrecen. He achieved his first success in 1909 and went on to compose a number of other well-received stage works over the following 20 years.

The song “Szép vagy, gyönyörű vagy Magyarország” (“Hungary, you are beautiful and splendid” from his operetta A hamburgi menyasszony (The bride from Hamburg) was quoted by Bartók in the fourth movement of his Concerto for Orchestra. He provided music for Az utolsó bohém (The last Bohemian) in 1913.

== Selected compositions ==
- Tilos a csók – Budapest, 8 October 1909
- Limonádé ezredes – Budapest, 5 September 1912
- A cigánygrófné – Budapest, 13 March 1920
- A hamburgi menyasszony – Budapest, 31 January 1922
- Az erősebb – Budapest, 1924
- Annabál – Budapest, 1925
- Huszárfogás – Budapest, 4 April 1930

== Discography ==
As a pianist, Vincze accompanied songs on Hungarian records labels before the First World War, as well as accompanying Jenő Hubay in works by Bach, Mozart and Hubay himself.
