= Kató Havas =

Hungarian violinist (1920–2018)

Kató Havas OBE (5 November 1920 – 31 December 2018) was a Hungarian classical violinist and a teacher of both the violin and viola who developed the "New Approach to violin playing" to help prevent physical injuries and eliminate stage fright related to playing the violin or viola. Through the teaching of the New Approach, Kató Havas realized that the release of physical tensions eliminated also mental tension. In her book Stage Fright Kató Havas analyzes the physical, mental and social causes of it and gives practical answers and exercises.

== Early life and education ==
Kató Havas was born in Târgu Secuiesc, Romania and became a child prodigy of the violin. Introduced to the instrument at the age of five, she gave her first professional recital at seven. Impressed by her playing, her compatriot Emil Telmányi arranged for her to study at the Royal Academy of Music in Budapest with Imre Waldbauer, the first violinist of the Waldbauer-Kerpely Quartet, where she received the traditional training.

Her musical education took place at a time when Waldbauer, Ernő Dohnányi, Bartók and Kodály were active in Hungary. Havas also claims Hungarian gypsy violin players had a profound influence on her later development of the New Approach.

== Career ==
At the age of eighteen she made her debut in America at Carnegie Hall and was acclaimed by the critics.

In the early sixties, a series of articles about her method by Noel Hale, F.R.A.M., appeared in The Strad. "I was privileged", wrote Hale, "to witness the teaching of a method of violin playing entirely new to me, which I believe is capable of revolutionizing the technique of playing… writing as a personal witness, I must say that I have been amazed at the results of this unusual approach." These articles started a heated debate.

In 1961, her first book, A New Approach to Violin Playing, was published, with a laudatory foreword by violin virtuoso Yehudi Menuhin.

Havas was invited to lecture at Oxford University, gave talks and demonstrations on television, as well as a series of lecture demonstrations in Great Britain, Australia, New Zealand, Canada and many European countries. She travelled extensively in the United States, giving workshops on the application of the new approach to violin and viola playing. She founded and directed the Purbeck Music Festival in Dorset, the Roehampton Music Festival in London and the International Festival in Oxford where she was based and approached by players from all over the world.

In 1992 the American String Teachers Association (ASTA) conferred upon her its prestigious Isaac Stern International Award in recognition of her "unparalleled achievements".

In 2002 Havas was appointed OBE (Officer of the Order of the British Empire) by Queen Elizabeth II, in the Queen's Birthday Honours, "for services to music". She died in December 2018 at the age of 98.

== Publications ==
- A New Approach to Violin Playing – 1961
- The Twelve Lesson Course in a New Approach to Violin Playing – 1964
- The Violin and I – An Autobiographical Account with Seven Years of Controversial Correspondence over the New Approach – 1968
- Stage Fright – Its Causes and Cures with Special Reference to Violin Playing – 1973
- Freedom to Play, Alexander Broude, 1981
- A New Approach on the Causes and Cures of Physical Injuries in Violin and Viola Playing, teaching video, 1991

Her books A New Approach, The Twelve Lesson Course and Stage Fright have been translated into Chinese, Czech, Dutch, German, Hungarian, Italian, Japanese, Spanish, Swedish. Havas's method has also inspired publications such as The Cellist's Inner Voice, a book by cello player and teacher at the Royal Manchester College of Music (later becoming the Royal Northern College of Music) Ian Bewley, on the application of the New Approach principles to cello playing.
