= Franz Liszt Chamber Orchestra =

Chamber orchestra based in Budapest, Hungary

- Chamber orchestra
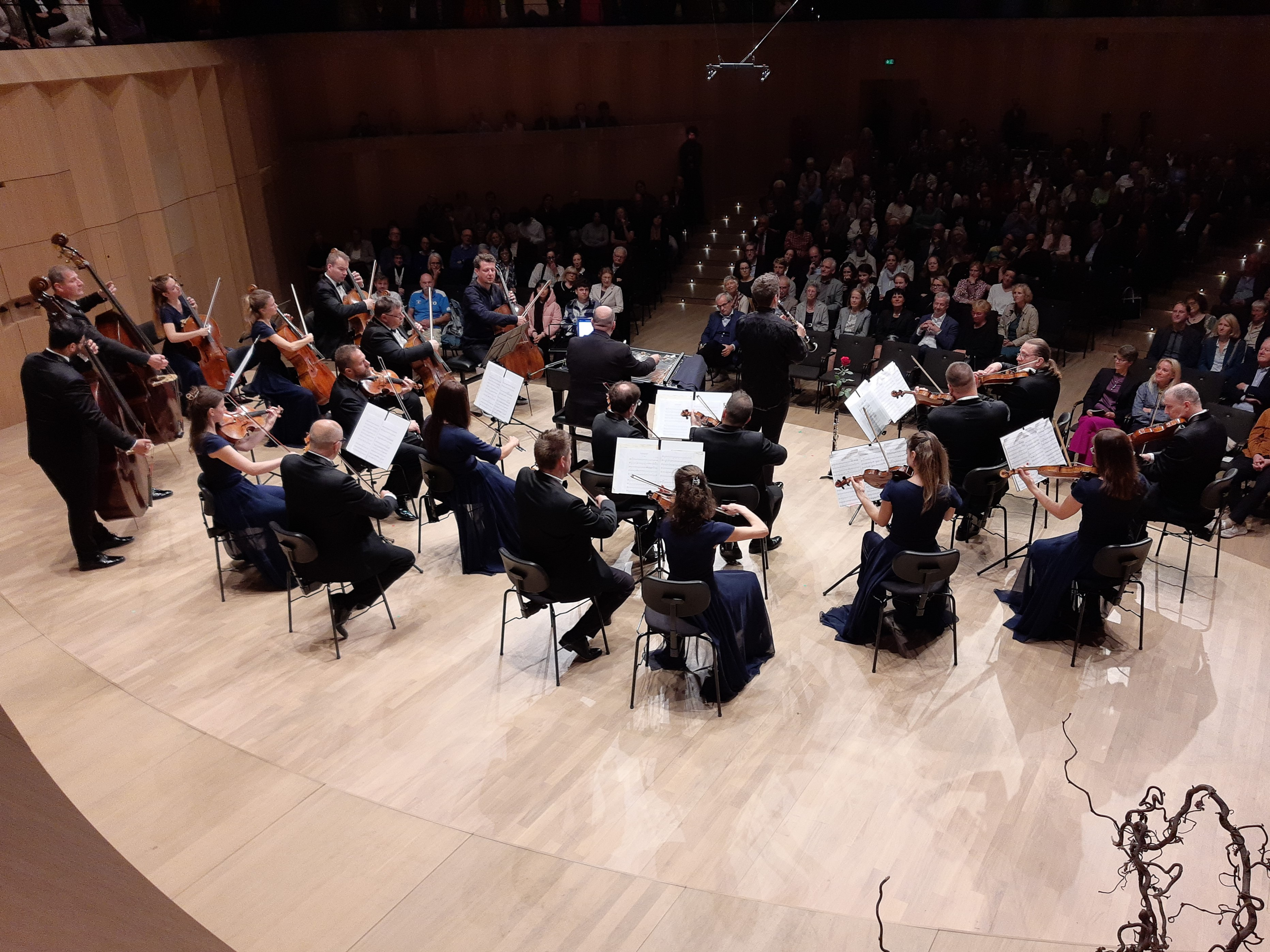
- The orchestra in concert at the Casals Forum, 2024
- Founded: 1963
- Location: Budapest, Hungary
- Website: www.lfkz.hu

The Franz Liszt Chamber Orchestra (Liszt Ferenc Kamarazenekar) is a chamber orchestra based in Budapest, Hungary.

The chamber orchestra took its name from the great Hungarian composer Franz Liszt, to pay homage to his genius, inseparable with the establishment of Hungarian music, whose spirit irradiates the musical life of the world. After having studied for years at the Franz Liszt Academy in Budapest, the orchestra made its debut in 1963 and since then has played a very significant role in Hungarian and international musical life. Conductor Frigyes Sandor led the orchestra from its founding to his death in 1979. The ensemble subsequently was led by conductor and violinist János Rolla, who in turn died in 2023. · .

The Franz Liszt Chamber Orchestra consists of 17 strings, with the addition of other instruments as needed (harpsichord, winds, etc.). The orchestra, whose repertoire ranges from Claudio Monteverdi to contemporary music, gives around 30 to 35 concerts a year in Hungary, in addition to touring throughout Europe, the United States, and Japan. The ensemble has collaborated with artists such as Jean-Pierre Rampal, Maurice André, Martha Argerich, Mstislav Rostropovich, Henryk Szeryng, Yehudi Menuhin, and Isaac Stern.

== Conductors ==
The ensemble's conductors have included:

- Frigyes Sándor (1963-1979);
- János Rolla (1979-2023).
