= Geoffrey Norris =

English musicologist and music critic (born 1947)

- Born: September 19, 1947 (age 79); London, England, UK
- Education: University of Durham; Russian State Institute of Performing Arts
- Occupations: Musicologist; music critic
- Notable credit: The Daily Telegraph

Geoffrey Norris (born 19 September 1947) is an English musicologist and music critic. His scholarship focuses on Russian composers; in particular, Norris is a scholar on the life and music of Sergei Rachmaninoff, about whom he has written numerous articles and a 1976 book-length study. He was chief classical music critic of The Daily Telegraph from 1995 to 2009.

== Life and career ==
Geoffrey Norris was born in London, England on 19 September 1947. An enthusiast for Russian culture since his youth, Norris attended the University of Durham where his undergraduate dissertation was on the leading group of 19th-century Russian composers known as The Five, The Influence of Folk-music and Liturgical Chants on the Orchestral Works of the Russian Nationalists (1969). He was awarded the ARCM diploma in piano from the Royal College of Music in 1967. He continued his studies of (18th-century) Russian music at the Leningrad Institute of Theatre, Music and Cinematography, now the Russian State Institute of Performing Arts, under Genrikh Orlov and Lev Raaben. From the early 1970s he was on the staff The New Grove Dictionary of Music and Musicians, chiefly responsible for editing East European material. From 1977 until 1983 he was a commissioning editor of scholarly music books at Oxford University Press. Since 1973 he has been a frequent broadcaster on BBC Radio 3 and the BBC World Service. Having briefly worked for The Times, he joined The Daily Telegraph as a music critic in 1983, and from 1995 to 2009 was its chief classical music critic. Norris has been a lecturer at the Royal Northern College of Music (1975-7), Goldsmiths University of London and elsewhere, as well as a jury member for piano competitions. Norris is emeritus professor of the Rachmaninoff Music Academy, Tambov, and from 2013 until 2022 lectured at the Gnesin Music Academy, Moscow.

Norris' scholarship focuses on Russian composers, and in particular, Sergei Rachmaninoff. He has written numerous articles, and a book-length study on Rachmaninoff, whose works he catalogued in a 1982 publication with Robert Threlfall. He has also compiled and edited an anthology of interviews that Rachmaninoff gave to the press, Sergei Rachmaninoff In His Own Words (2024).

== Selected writings ==
=== Books ===
- Norris, Geoffrey (1976). Rakhmaninov. The Master Musicians Series. London: J.M. Dent. ISBN 978-0-460-03145-5. 2nd, revised edn, as Rachmaninoff (1993).
- ——; Threlfall, Robert (1982). A Catalogue of the Compositions of S. Rachmaninoff. London: Scolar Press. ISBN 978-0-85967-617-5.
- —— (2024). Sergei Rachmaninoff In His Own Words. Frankfurt: Wolke Verlag. ISBN 978-3-95593-272-5.

=== Articles ===
- Norris, Geoffrey (1973). "Rachmaninoff's Second Thoughts". The Musical Times. 114 (1562): 364–368. doi:10.2307/955179. JSTOR 955179.
- —— (July 1973). "Rakhmaninov's Student Opera". The Musical Quarterly. 59 (3): 441–448. doi:10.1093/mq/LIX.3.441. JSTOR 41788.
- —— (September 1976). "Russia on Stravinsky". Tempo (118): 39-40.
- —— (September 1977). "Tchaikovsky and the 18th Century". The Musical Times. 118 (1615): 715-716.
- —— (May 1979). "Shostakovich's The Nose". The Musical Times. 120 (1634): 393-394.
- —— (April 1980). "Bitter Memories: the Shostakovich Testimony". The Musical Times. 121 (1646): 241-243.
- —— (1982). "The Operas". Shostakovich: The Man and his Music, ed. Christopher Norris. London: Lawrence and Wishart. 105-124.
- —— (October 1982). "An Opera Restored: Rimsky-Korsakov, Shostakovich and the Khovansky Business. The Musical Times. 123 (1676): 672-674.
- —— (October 1983). "Rakhmaninov's Apprenticeship". The Musical Times. 124 (1688): 602–603+605. doi:10.2307/961696. JSTOR 961696.
- —— (April 1993). "Rachmaninov in London". The Musical Times. 134 (1802): 186-188.
- —— (1995). "Rachmaninoff's Reception in England 1899-1938". Studies in Music from the University of Western Ontario. 15: 49-58.
- —— (1998). "[Rachmaninoff's] Piano Sonata No. 2: A Cut Too Far?". International Rachmaninoff Festival-Conference, University of Maryland. 26-28.
- —— (2001). "Rachmaninoff [Rakhmaninov, Rachmaninov], Serge". Grove Music Online. Oxford: Oxford University Press. doi:10.1093/gmo/9781561592630.article.50146. ISBN 978-1-56159-263-0. (subscription, Wikilibrary access, or UK public library membership required)
- Норрис, Джеффри (2016). "Фортепианные сонаты С. Рахманинова: дилеммы исполнителя". Рахманинов и XXI век: прошлое и настоящее (Moscow, 2016): 16–19.
