= Alasdair Tait =

Scottısh musician

Alasdair Tait is a Scottish cellist, teacher and artistic director who is the Chief Executive & Artistic Director of Young Classical Artists Trust. Tait previously recorded and toured with the Belcea Quartet, performed at music festivals, and judged music competitions.

Tait is also a psychodynamic psychotherapist in private practice in London, registered with BPC, and FPC.

== Life ==
Born in Scotland, Tait studied at the Royal Northern College of Music (RNCN) under Emma Ferrand and Ralph Kirshbaum and at the City of Basel Music Academy with Thomas Demenga. On returning to the UK in 1998, Tait joined the Belcea Quartet and was its cellist until 2006.

While with the quartet, Tait performed at Carnegie Hall, Musikverein and Konzerthaus, Köln Philharmonie, Concertgebouw, Chatelet, Cité de la Musique, Frankfurt Alte Oper and the Casals Hall in Tokyo. Tait recorded CD’s of Schubert, Brahms, Britten, Mozart, Fauré and Barber for EMI, and collaborated with Ian Bostridge, Thomas Ades, Thomas Kakuska and Jonathan Lemalu.

Tait served as was Head of Chamber Music at Guildhall School of Music until 2016. He then became Chief Executive of Young Classical Artists Trust (YCAT). He previously held the posts of Director of Chamber Music at the RNCM in Manchester, Artistic Director of the RNCM International Chamber Music Festival, Professor of Chamber Music at the International Chamber Music Institute of the Reina Sofía School of Music. Tait has also been a regular professor on the Britten-Pears International Quartet Academy and the European Chamber Music Academy (ECMA).

Tait has served as a jury member on international competitions such as Melbourne, London and Banff International String Quartet Competitions. He has given masterclasses at the Banff Centre for the Arts, the Glen Gould School, the New England Conservatory of Music and Stanford University.

He is currently a council member for Aldeburgh Music, a trustee for the Ann Driver Trust, and previously was a Governor for Live Music Now UK and founder board member of the European Chamber Music Teachers Association.

== Festivals ==
Alasdair has participated in the Edinburgh, Salzburg, Schubertiade, Risør, Delft, Aldeburgh, Cheltenham and Bath festivals. He has performed with Piotr Anderszewski, Christian Zacharias, Kathryn Stott, Imogen Cooper, Aleksander Madzar, Robert Levin, Isabelle van Keulen, Alexander Janicek, Valentin Erben, the Borodin Quartet, Heinz Holliger, Michael Collins, Simon Keenlyside, Dame Anne Murray and Christine Schäfer.

== Awards ==
- 2013 made a Senior Fellow of the Higher Education Academy
- 2016 awarded the ABO (Association of British Orchestras) Artist Manager of the Year.

== Sources ==
- Biography from the Royal Northern College of Music page
- Tumelty, Michael (28 June 2006). "Welcome to the Tait modern". The Herald. Glasgow: Newsquest Media Group. p. 8. Archived from the original on 21 October 2012.
