= Shlomo Mintz =

Israeli violinist, violist, and conductor (born 1957)

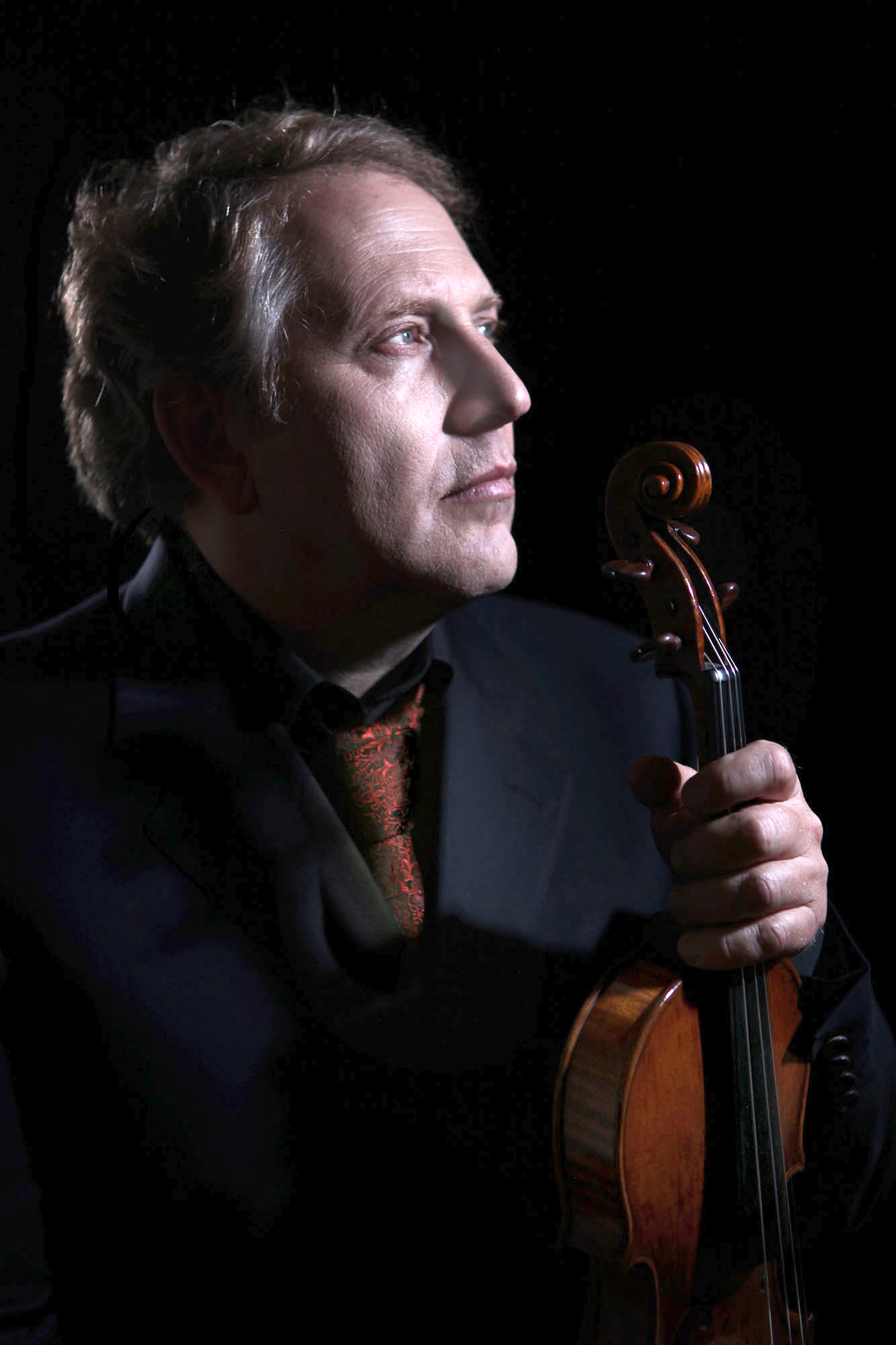
Shlomo Mintz

Shlomo Mintz (Hebrew: שלמה מינץ; born 30 October 1957) is a Russian-born Israeli violinist and conductor. He regularly appears with orchestras and conductors on the international scene and is heard in recitals and chamber music concerts around the world.

== Early life ==
Shlomo Mintz was born in Moscow. In 1959, when he was two, his family immigrated to Israel, where he studied with Ilona Feher, a student of Jenő Hubay. Feher introduced Shlomo Mintz to Isaac Stern, who became his mentor. He was also a student of Dorothy DeLay in New York.

== Music career ==
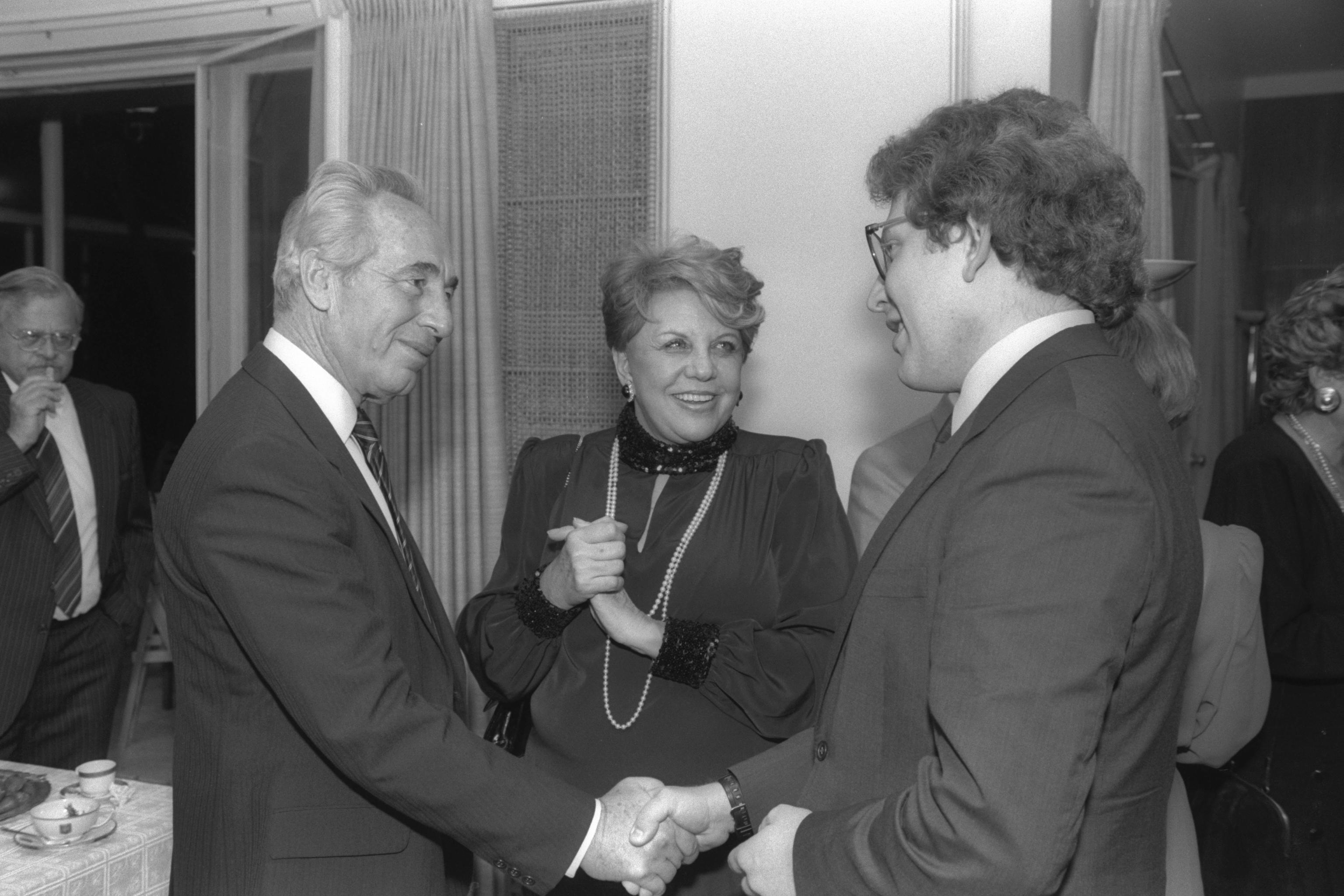
Prime Minister Shimon Peres (left) receiving Israeli violinist Shlomo Mintz at a reception given in honor of conductor Zubin Mehta's 50th birthday. In center, Mira Avrech

His first performance on stage was at the age of six, and at age eleven he played as soloist with the Israel Philharmonic Orchestra. Soon afterward, he was called on a week's notice by Zubin Mehta to play Paganini's Violin Concerto No. 1, Op. 6, with the orchestra when Itzhak Perlman fell ill. He made his Carnegie Hall debut at the age of sixteen with the Pittsburgh Symphony Orchestra (conducted by William Steinberg).

Under the auspices of Isaac Stern and the American-Israel Cultural Foundation he started studying at the Juilliard School of Music in New York and soon afterward at the age of 18, he made an extensive tour through Europe. He also signed, still in his early twenties, a long-term recording contract with Deutsche Grammophon and was invited by Berlin, Vienna, Concertgebouw, Chicago, Los Angeles, Cleveland, Philadelphia and New York Philharmonic Orchestras frequently.

He has collaborated with Isaac Stern, Mstislav Rostropovich, Pinchas Zukerman, Itzhak Perlman, Zubin Mehta, Claudio Abbado, Carlo Maria Giulini, Antal Dorati, Erich Leinsdorf, Eugene Ormandy, Riccardo Muti, Yuri Temirkanov, Ida Haendel and Ivry Gitlis.

== Conductor and artistic director ==
At the age of eighteen, Mintz launched a parallel career as a conductor, and has since led acclaimed orchestras worldwide including the Royal Philharmonic (United Kingdom), the NHK Symphony (Japan) and the Israel Philharmonic. He was music advisor of the Israel Chamber Orchestra from 1989 to 1993, and in March 1994 was appointed artistic advisor and principal guest conductor of the Maastricht Symphony in the Netherlands, which he led for some weeks during four seasons, sometimes as both conductor and violin soloist. In 2008, he became principal guest conductor of the Zagreb Philharmonic. From 2002 to 2012, he was artistic director of the Sion-Valais International Music Festival. Mintz was also the artistic director of Arena di Verona winter season and performed Mendelssohn Elijah Oratorio, as a highlight of his season.

His guest conducting appearances included orchestras like Concertgebouw Orchestra, La Scala, London Symphony Orchestra, Royal Philharmonic Orchestra, Rotterdam Philharmonic, Stuttgart Radio Orchestra, La Fenice, Detroit Symphony and Teatro Colón.

== Teaching career ==
Mintz gives master classes worldwide, including Crans-Montana Classics, Switzerland, since summer 2012, where he is the artistic director.

He was one of the founders of the Keshet Eilon International Violin Mastercourse in Israel, an advanced-level summer program for young talented violinists from all around the world in Kibbutz Eilon, Israel, and served as a patron there for eighteen years (1992-2010).

== Additional activities ==
Mintz was a co-founder of the "Violins of Hope" project together with violinmaker Amnon Weinstein. Forty-five violins once owned by players who lost their lives in ghettos and concentration camps during World War II were restored by Weinstein and have been displayed internationally. The Violins of Hope were presented in a special event in Jerusalem for the sixtieth-anniversary celebration of the State of Israel.

Mintz has served as a jury member of international competitions, including the Tchaikovsky Competition in Moscow (1993) and the Queen Elisabeth International Music Competition in Brussels (1993 and 2001). He was also invited to be jury president of the International Henryk Wieniawski Competition (October 2001) for the Violin in Poznań, Poland. From 2002 to 2011, he was jury president of the Sion Valais-International Violin Competition in Switzerland. He is a mentor and jury president of the International Violin Competition in Buenos Aires, president of the Ilona Fehér Budapest Violin Competition, the Munetsugu Angel Violin Competition Japan and HKIVS Shlomo Mintz Beijing International Violin Competition.

== Personal life ==
Mintz is married to Corina, who grew up in Italy and Germany, and worked as an interpreter specializing in art. They have two sons, Eliav and Alexander. Shlomo owned a villa in Italy and a castle in Germany but he primarily raised his family in an unpretentious, contemporary ranch in Sands Point, New York. With over 150 concerts a year, Mintz regrets not having enough time to spend with this children due to his hectic performance schedule and wished he could have spent more time “shooting nintendo with Eliav”. His children are also musically inclined, and Eliav picked up piano and viola at a young age. Although Shlomo was not around often, his wife says “it's very special when daddy’s home”.

== Awards and recognition ==
- Premio Accademia Musicale Chigiana, Siena
- Diapason d’Or
- Grand Prix du Disque (twice)
- Gramophone Award
- Edison Award (twice)
- Cremona Music Award

In May 2006, Mintz received an honorary doctorate from the Ben-Gurion University of the Negev in Be’er Sheva, Israel, for his international artistic contributions.

== Discography ==
Mintz maintains an active recording schedule as both soloist and conductor for Deutsche Grammophon, Erato, RCA Victor, Avie Records and Challenge Records.

Recordings:

- J.S. Bach: Bach Sonatas & Partitas for Solo Violin, BWV 1001 – 1006, Deutsche Grammophon
- Bartok: 2 Portraits, Deutsche Grammophon
- Bartók: Violin Concerto No. 1, RN
- Beethoven: Violin Concerto and the two Romances, Deutsche Grammophon
- Brahms: Complete Violin & Viola Sonatas, Avie Records and Magnatune
- Brahms: Violin Concerto, Deutsche Grammophon
- Bruch: Violin Concerto in G minor, Deutsche Grammophon (first recording, together with Mendelssohn: Violin Concerto in E minor)
- Debussy: Violin Sonata in G minor, Ravel: Violin Sonata, Franck: Violin Sonata in A, Deutsche Grammophon
- Dvořák: Violin Concerto, Deutsche Grammophon
- Fauré: The two Violin Sonatas, Op. 13 in A & Op. 108 in E minor, Deutsche Grammophon
- Israel Philharmonic: 60th Anniversary Gala Concert, RCA Victor
- Kreisler: Selected violin works, Deutsche Grammophon
- Lalo: Symphonie Espagnole, Vieuxtemps: Concerto No. 5 and Saint-Saëns: ‘Introduction et Rondo Capriccioso’, Deutsche Grammophon
- Mendelssohn: Violin Concerto in E minor, Deutsche Grammophon (first recording, together with Bruch: Violin Concerto in G minor)
- Mendelssohn: The two Violin Sonatas, Deutsche Grammophon
- Mozart: Sinfonia Concertante in E-flat for Violin and Viola, K. 364, RCA Victor
- Mozart: The five Violin Concertos, Sinfonia Concertante in E-flat and Concertone, Avie Records (also on Magnatune)
- Paganini: The 24 Caprices for violin solo, Op. 1, Deutsche Grammophon
- Prokofiev: The Violin Concertos, in D major and G minor, Opp. 19 & 63, Deutsche Grammophon
- Prokofiev: The two Violin Sonatas, in F minor and D major, Opp. 80 & 94a, Deutsche Grammophon
- Shostakovich: Violin Sonata Op.134 & Viola Sonata Op. 147, Erato
- Sibelius: Violin Concerto in D minor, Deutsche Grammophon
- Stravinsky ‘Histoire du Soldat’, Valois
- Vivaldi: ‘The Four Seasons’ (Il Cimento dell' Armonia e Invenzione: Violin Concertos 1–4), Deutsche Grammophon
- Vivaldi: Complete Violin Concertos (in 10 vols.), MusicMasters Classics.*

== See also ==
- List of violinists
- Music in Israel
