= Paul Rolland =

American violinist and violin instructor

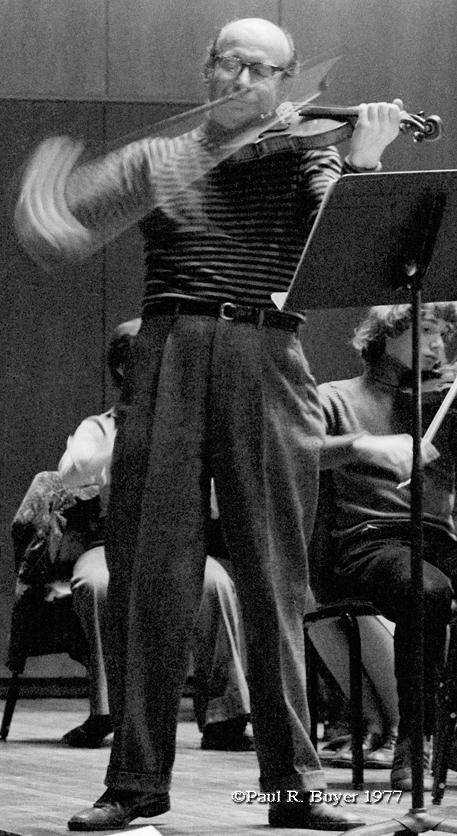
Rolland performing in 1977

Paul Rolland (né Pali Reisman; November 21, 1911 – November 9, 1978) was a violinist and an influential American violin teacher who concentrated on the pedagogy of teaching fundamentals to beginning string students and on remedial techniques for string players of any level. He was famous for emphasizing that the physical demands of most violin techniques can be taught ("in embryonic form") in the first two years of violin education. He advocated that teachers learn and teach freedom of movement and use clear, specific and concise instructions when teaching. His approach to pedagogy was extremely analytical, and his teaching approach was highly systematic and logical. His wife, Clara Rolland, said of his work "Every possible movement in string playing was analyzed.... Different methods do indeed exist, but none more fundamental.... Paul never harmed anyone's playing. He helped a person through certain body movements and the knowledge of what those body movements meant physically, in the scientific way of playing the violin."[Cite]

== Education and teaching career ==
Paul Rolland's early childhood was spent on a farm in Paloc, Hungary where he was fascinated with the free and natural playing of romani musicians who travelled through the area. He was otherwise surrounded by music; his mother, aunt, and older sister were pianists. After the death of his father in 1918, the family moved to Budapest where his mother played piano in silent films to support the family.

He did not receive formal violin training until age 11, this instruction being based on the German-Hungarian school of playing founded by Hubay. Later instruction was in the pedagogically progressive Hungarian school of violin playing that utilized kinesthetics, one of those proponents being Carl Flesch. From ages 18–23, he studied with Dezső Rados whose emphasis was on large free movements and who overhauled Rolland's playing.

From ages 23–27, Rolland studied at the Franz Liszt Academy with Imre Waldbauer, whose pedagogy was based on movement led by the larger limbs. Waldbauer was biomechanically analytical, very cerebral, a user of words, and taught by description rather than by example. He likened playing to other physical activities like tennis. Through his study with Waldbauer, Rolland learned the ability to break playing techniques down into small parts.

He came to the US in 1938 for better playing and teaching opportunities. In 1945, he left the Westminster Choir College in Princeton, NJ to take up a teaching position at the University of Illinois, where he became a professor of music. He remained at Illinois until his death in 1977, at the age of 66.

Through the Illinois String Research Project devised by him and colleagues at the University of Illinois, a program of instruction for children based on the early establishment of good movement patterns was developed. An addition to the workshops beginning in 2019, is Certification in Paul Rolland String Pedagogy.

== Publications ==
Rolland made his own teachings and insights available in a set of videos and a book titled The Teaching of Action in String Playing. His ideas and methods were also documented in the University of Illinois String Research Project films. He helped to found the American String Teachers Association, and in 1950 became the first editor of its journal American String Teacher. He also published numerous articles on string pedagogy in the International Musician, The School Musician, Violins, The Instrumentalist, and the Journal of Research in Music Education.

He also published a large number of books on string pedagogy.

The Sousa Archives and Center for American Music at the University of Illinois at Urbana-Champaign holds the Paul Rolland Papers, which consists of correspondence and publicity, as well as films and audio recordings related to the development of "The Teaching of Action in String Playing."

== Sources ==
- Eisele, Mark Joseph. The Writings of Paul Rolland: An annotated bibliography and a biographical sketch (PDF). Archived from the original (PDF) on 2006-10-20.
- Music Library - University of Illinois Catalog entry. "Collection: Rolland".
- Sousa Archives and Center for American Music, Finding Aid for Paul Rolland Papers, 1939-83, 1986-87, 1992
- Denig, Lynne. Personal reflections of studies with Paul Rolland, 1975–1978.
