= Corina Belcea =

Romanian violinist

Corina Belcea (born 1975) is a Romanian violinist who resides in Basel, Switzerland.

== Biography ==
She started violin lessons at the age of six. Her teachers in Romania were Radu Bozgan and Ştefan Gheorghiu. In 1991, she took part in the Yehudi Menuhin International Competition for Young Violinists. Yehudi Menuhin then invited her to study at the Yehudi Menuhin School. Her teacher there was Natalia Boyarskaya. She continued her studies at the Royal College of Music. Her teacher there was Felix Andrievsky.

In 1994, while she was studying at the Royal College of Music she founded the Belcea Quartet.

She has also performed as a soloist in venues such as Smith Square Hall, Queen Elizabeth Hall, Barbican Hall, Purcell Room, Théâtre du Châtelet and Théâtre des Champs-Élysées. She was awarded the Cobbett Medal for services to chamber music in 2021.

Belcea plays a Giovanni Battista Guadagnini violin on loan from Merito SIT and owns a contemporary violin made by Felix Daniel Rotaru in 2016.

== Competitions and awards ==
- Joint First Prize, Kloster Schöntal International Competition, Schöntal Abbey, Germany, 1990
- Second Prize, International Competition for Young Violinists in Honour of Karol Lipinski and Henryk Wieniawski, Lublin, Poland, 1994
- Second Prize, Menuhin Competition, Folkestone, Great Britain. 1995
- First Prize, Bromsgrove Festival, 1997
- LASMO Staffa Music Award, 1998
