= Jenő Hubay =

Hungarian musical artist (1858–1937)

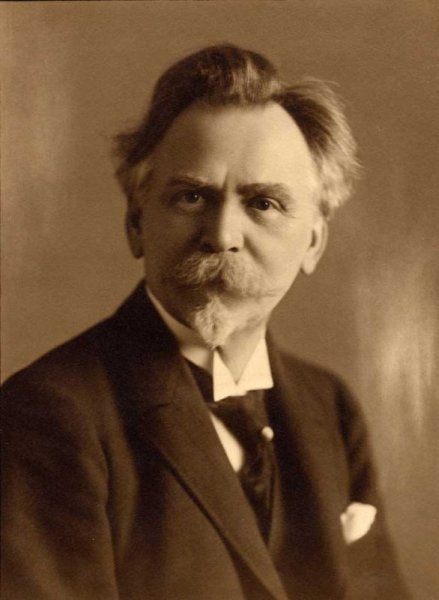

Background information
- Also known as: Eugen Huber
- Born: 15 September 1858; Pest, Kingdom of Hungary, Austrian Empire (now Budapest)
- Died: 12 March 1937 (aged 78) Budapest, Hungary
- Genres: Classical, Late Romantic
- Occupations: Composer, violinist, teacher
- Instrument: Violin

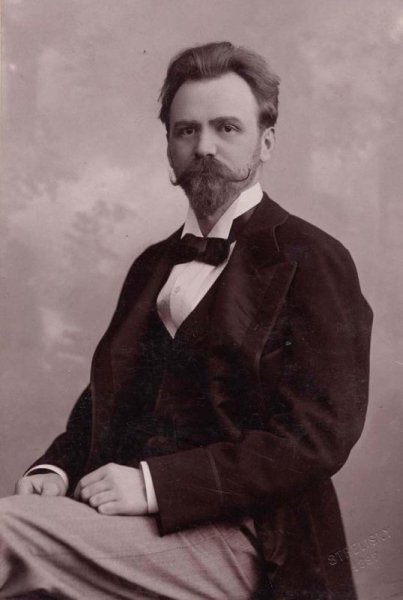
Hubay in 1897

Jenő Hubay de Szalatnya (Hungarian: Szalatnyai Hubay Jenő [ˈhubɒi ˈjɛnøː]; 15 September 1858 – 12 March 1937), also known by his German name Eugen Huber (pronounced [ˈɔʏɡeːn ˈhuːbɐ, ˈɔʏɡn̩ -]), was a Hungarian violinist, composer and music teacher.

== Early life ==
Hubay was born into a German family of musicians in Pest, Hungary. He adopted the Hungarian version of his name, Jenő Hubay, in his twenties, while living in the French-speaking world.

Hubay was trained in violin and music by his father, Karl Huber (Károly Huber, later Károly Hubay) from Varjas (Romanian: Variaș), concertmaster of the Hungarian Royal Opera House and a teacher at the Budapest College of Music. His mother was of Italian descent. He gave his début public performance playing a concerto at the age of eleven.

At the age of thirteen, Hubay began his studies in Berlin. He remained there for five years, receiving instruction from Joseph Joachim. In 1878, following the advice of Franz Liszt, he made his début in Paris, which was a great success. Sitting in the audience was Henri Vieuxtemps, with whom Hubay formed an intimate friendship and from whom he received instruction.

In 1882 Hubay was employed at the Brussels music institute as the head of the department of violin studies. Returning to Hungary in 1886, he succeeded his father as head of the Liszt Academy. That same year, he established the Budapest Quartet with fellow teacher, cellist David Popper.

== Teaching ==
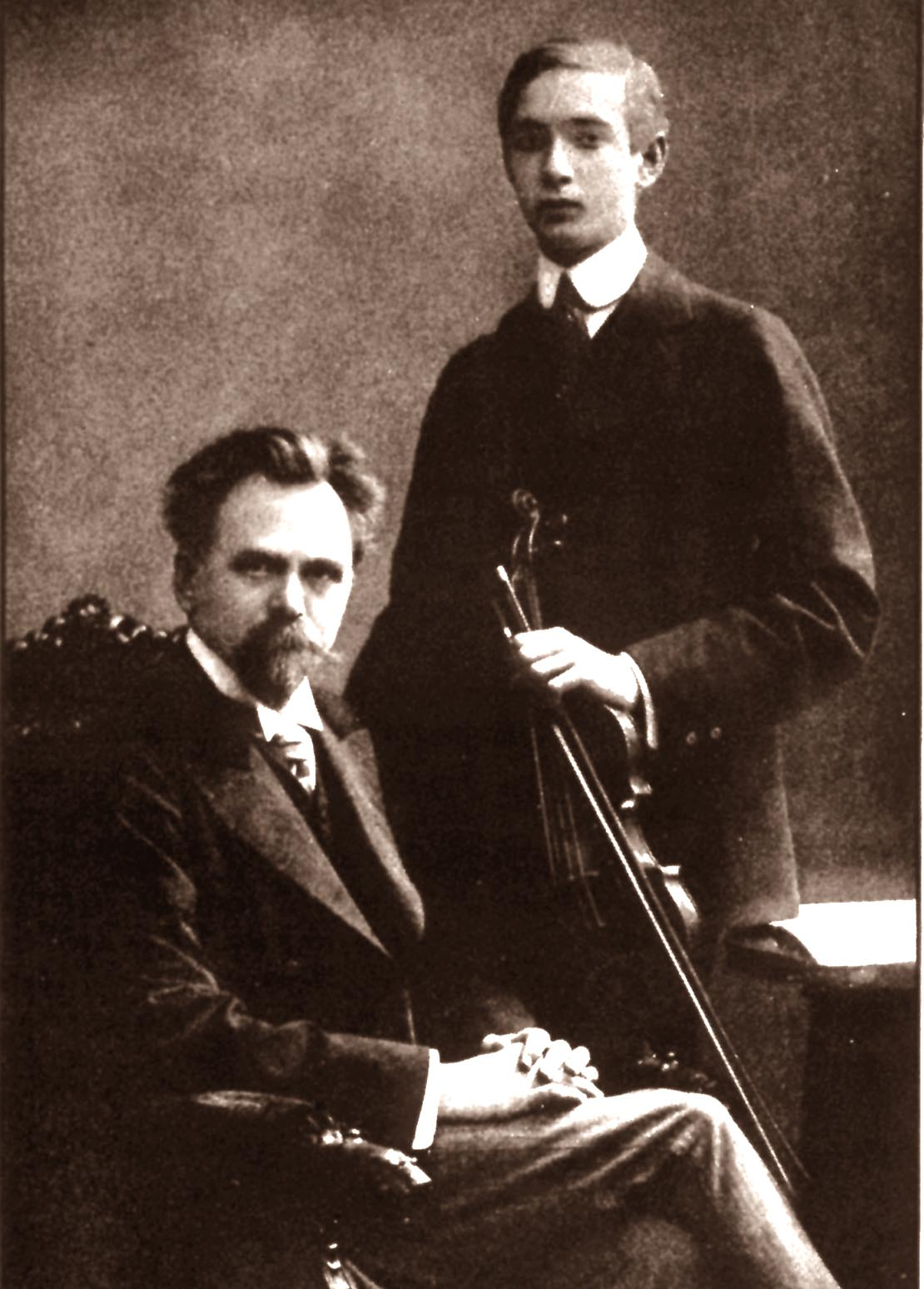
Hubay with pupil Joseph Szigeti, circa 1910

Hubay's main pupils, aside from Joseph Szigeti and André Gertler, included Eugene Ormandy — who later turned to conducting — and Eugene Lehner.

He taught many female violinists, including Stefi Geyer, Jelly d'Arányi, Ilona Fehér, and Gabriella Lengyel. Other pupils included Franz von Vecsey, Emil Telmányi, Carl von Garaguly, Zoltán Székely, Tibor Varga, Gerhard Taschner, Ede Zathureczky and the Italians Gianni Pavovich, and Wanda Luzzato. He also taught the African American jazz violinist Eddie South.

== Performance ==
As a soloist, Hubay gained the praise of Vieuxtemps, Johannes Brahms and many others.

As a chamber musician, he formed two string quartets, one while he was in Brussels and one with David Popper during his Budapest (Budapest Quartet) years. With Popper, he performed chamber music on more than one occasion with Brahms, including the premiere of Brahms's Piano Trio No. 3 in C minor, Op. 101.

Among his earliest recordings are ten-inch acoustic discs, dating from 1910, on which he was accompanied by the composer Zsigmond Vincze.

== Compositions ==
Hubay composed four violin concertos and a very large number of encore pieces. His concertos incorporate themes from Hungarian music, and his "gentle breeze" pieces, which share features of the compositional style of his chamber music partner, David Popper, continue the tradition of the German romantics such as Felix Mendelssohn and Robert Schumann.

Hubay's output also contains several operas, including The Venus of Milo, The Violin-Maker of Cremona, The Mask and Anna Karenina (after Leo Tolstoy). The opening of The Venus of Milo is based on whole tone scales and archaisms that perhaps are meant to suggest the ancient setting.

== Legacy ==
The Hubay prize has been awarded by the Franz Liszt Academy of Music to a number of eminent violinists:

- Gábor Takács-Nagy
