= ARD International Music Competition =

Annual classical music competition held in Germany

The ARD International Music Competition (German: Internationaler Musikwettbewerb der ARD) is the largest international classical music competition in Germany. It is organised by the Bayerischer Rundfunk and is held once a year in Munich, usually in September. Since its inception in 1952, it has become one of the most prestigious classical music competitions. In 1957, it became one of the founding members of the World Federation of International Music Competitions.

A prize at this competition has acted as a springboard for a career. Notable past winners and prize winners include: Yuri Bashmet, Myung-whun Chung, Christoph Eschenbach, Sol Gabetta, Alban Gerhardt, Natalia Gutman, Heinz Holliger, Nobuko Imai, Tsuyoshi Tsutsumi, Kim Kashkashian, François Leleux, Jessye Norman, Quatuor Ébène, Thomas Quasthoff, Jean-Guihen Queyras, Antoine Tamestit, Christian Tetzlaff, Alexandre Tharaud, Tokyo String Quartet, Mitsuko Uchida and Anne Sofie von Otter.

== History ==
Between 1947 and 1950, the Radio Frankfurt held a "Young Soloists Competition". The earliest competition discovered two female vocalists who would soon take their place among the international talented: Christa Ludwig and Erika Köth. Instrumentalists included flautist Karlheinz Zöller and pianist Robert-Alexander Bohnke. The newly founded ARD continued the concept of bringing together talented young musicians from the entire globe.

The competition categories change from year to year and include solo instrumentsm voice and chamber ensembles. An emphasis has been placed on modern music, and contemporary composers have regularly been commissioned to write new pieces for this Competition since 2001.

350 to 450 young musicians usually apply each year, out of whom 200 candidates, from 35 to 40 countries, make it past the preliminary round. A large percentage of competitors come from countries other than Germany (up to 86%).

The 2020 edition was cancelled because of the COVID-19 pandemic in Germany.

== Categories ==
- 2000: Flute, Voice, Piano duo, Viola, String quartet
- 2001: Violin, Cello, Wind quintet, Percussion, Saxophone
- 2002: Piano, Oboe, Bassoon, Piano trio
- 2003: Voice, Clarinet, Trumpet, Double bass,
- 2004: Flute, Viola, String quartet, Harp
- 2005: Violin, Piano duo, Horn, Cello
- 2006: Piano, Voice (Opera), Voice (Concert/Lied), Wind quintet
- 2007: Oboe, Trombone, Piano trio, Percussion
- 2008: Bassoon, Clarinet, Viola, String quartet
- 2009: Violin, Voice, Double bass, Harp
- 2010: Flute, Piano duo, Horn, Cello
- 2011: Piano, Oboe, Piano duo, Trumpet, Organ
- 2012: Voice, Clarinet, String quartet
- 2013: Violin, Bassoon, Viola, Piano trio
- 2014: Piano, Cello, Wind quintet, Percussion
- 2015: Flute, Voice, Piano duo, Trombone
- 2016: Horn, Double bass, String quartet, Harp
- 2017: Piano, Violin, Oboe, Guitar
- 2018: Voice, Trumpet, Viola, Piano trio
- 2019: Bassoon, Clarinet, Cello, Percussion
- 2021: Piano Duo, Horn, Voice, Violin
- 2022: Flute, Trombone, Piano, String quartet
- 2023: Piano trio, Harp, Viola, Double bass
- 2024: Wind Quintet, Voice, Oboe, Violoncello
- 2025: Piano, Clarinet, Trumpet
- 2026: Bassoon, Percussion, String quartet, Organ

Piano competition had been held almost uninterruptedly from 1952 to 1973, except the years 1955 and 1964. It was then held every other year till 1981. It was held consecutively from 1981 to 1983, and then every other year again till 1999. In 1953, three categories were added: violin, flute, violin-piano duo. Violin competition was held every 3 years from 1966 to 1984.

Four categories were added in 1954: voice, oboe, bassoon, clarinet. The voice competition had been held every year from 1954 to 1972. It was then held every two years till 2000. Oboe competition had been held every five years from 1976 to 1996. Bassoon competition had been held six times in the 20th century.

The competition kept expanding categories in the following years, adding piano duo (1955), horn (1956), cello (1957), organ (1957). New categories in 1958 were cello-piano duo, trumpet, and harpsichord, which would only have three additional editions. String quartet competition opened in 1959.

The 1960s saw the first edition of piano trio (1961), viola (1962), trombone (1965), wind quintet (1966). Two categories briefly appeared: string trio (1961, 1969) and piano sight-reading (1963, 1965). Four categories premiered in the 1970s: guitar (1976), percussion (1977), double bass (1979), and recorder, which was only held twice so far (1978, 1988). The first harp competition was held in 1983, as its only edition in the 20th century.

== Prize money ==
Prize money per category

- 1. Prize: €10,000
- 2. Prize: €7,500
- 3. Prize: €5,000

== Winners ==
- Category:Prize-winners of the ARD International Music Competition

Full lists of winners can be retrieved from the competition's website.

=== 1994s ===
1994

Voice (female)

- 1st Prize: Urszula Kryger, Poland
- 2nd Prize: Christian Elsner, Germany
- 3rd Prizes Islam, Louise Ali-Zadeh, Uzbekistan

Violoncello

- 1st Prize: Jens Peter Maintz, Germany
- 2nd Prize: Tatjana Vasiljeva, Russia
- 3rd Prizes Tanja Tetzlaff, Germany

Organ

- 2nd Prize: Ariane Metz, Germany
- 3rd Prizes Leonhard Amselgruber, Germany

=== 2000s ===
2000

Voice (female)

- 1st Prize: Zoryana Kushpler, Ukraine
- 3rd Prizes (shared): Stefanie Krahnenfeld, Germany; Christa Mayer, Germany

Voice (male)

- 1st Prize: Konrad Jarnot, Great Britain
- 2nd Prize: Nathaniel Webster, USA
- 3rd Prize: Friedemann Röhlig, Germany

Viola

- 2nd Prize: Danusha Waskiewicz, Germany

Flute

- 2nd Prizes (shared): Rozàlia Szabó, Hungary; Henrik Wiese, Germany
- 3rd Prize: Kersten McCall, Germany

Piano Duo

- 1st Prize: Mati Mikalai / Kai Ratassepp, Estonia
- 2nd Prize: Duo d'Accord, Taiwan/Germany

String Quartet

- 2nd Prize: Avalon String Quartett, France/Canada/USA
- 3rd Prize: Quartetto Prometeo, Italy

2001

Violin

- 2nd Prize: Annette von Hehn, Germany
- 3rd Prizes (shared): Min Jung Kang, Korea; Yamei Yu, Germany

Cello

- 1st Prize: Danjulo Ishizaka, Germany
- 2nd Prizes (shared): Julie Albers, USA; Monika Leskovar, Croatia
- 3rd Prize: Thomas Carroll, Great Britain

Saxophone

- 2nd Prize: Alexandre Doisy, France
- 3rd Prizes (shared): Lutz Koppetsch, Germany; Julien Petit, France

Percussion

- 1st Prize: Marta Klimasara, Poland
- 2nd Prize: Eirik Raude, Norway
- 3rd Prize: Christophe Roldan, France

Wind Quintet

- 1st Prize: Miró Ensemble, Spain
- 2nd Prize: Orsolino Quintett, Germany/Austria
- 3rd Prize: St. Petersburg Woodwind Quintet, Russia

2002

Bassoon

- 2nd Prize: Matthias Rácz, Germany
- 3rd Prizes (shared): Jaakko Luoma, Finland; Lyndon Watts, Australia

Oboe

- 3rd Prizes (shared): Nora Cismondi, France; Alexandre Gattet, France

Piano

- 1st Prize: Denys Proshayev, Ukraine
- 2nd Prize: Ferenc Vizi, Romania
- 3rd Prize: Chiao-Ying Chang, Taiwan

Piano Trio

- 2nd Prizes (shared): Trio con Brio, Denmark/Korea; Trio Ondine, Sweden/Denmark/Norway

2003

Voice (female)

- 1st Prize: Marina Prudenskaja, Russia
- 2nd Prizes (shared): Andrea Lauren Brown, USA; Measha Brueggergosman, Canada
- 3rd Prize: Julia Sukmanova, Russia

Voice (male)

- 1st Prize: Gérard Kim, Korea
- 3rd Prizes (shared): Tyler Duncan, Canada; Günter Papendell, Germany

Double Bass

- 1st Prize: Nabil Shehata, Germany
- 2nd Prize: Roman Patkoló, Slovakia
- 3rd Prize: Ödön Rácz, Hungary

Clarinet

- 2nd Prize: Olivier Patey, France
- 3rd Prize: Florent Pujuila, France

Trumpet

- 1st Prize: David Guerrier, France
- 2nd Prize: Giuliano Sommerhalder, Switzerland
- 3rd Prizes (shared): Gabor Richter, Hungary; Guillaume Couloumy, France

2004

Viola

- 1st Prize: Antoine Tamestit, France
- 2nd Prize: Ryszard Groblewski, Poland
- 3rd Prize: Tomoko Akasaka, Japan

Flute

- 1st Prize: Magali Mosnier, France
- 2nd Prize: Pirmin Grehl, Germany
- 3rd Prize: Andrea Oliva, Italy

String Quartet

- 1st Prize: Ébène Quartet, France
- 2nd Prize: Faust Quartett, Germany
- 3rd Prize: Quatuor Benaïm, Israel/France

Harp

- 1st Prize: Anton Sie, Netherlands
- 2nd Prize: Nabila Chajai, France
- 3rd Prize: Mirjam Schroder, Germany

2005

Violin

- 1st Prize: Keisuke Okasaki, Japan
- 2nd Prize: Akiko Yamada, Japan
- 3rd Prize: Katja Lämmermann, Germany

Cello

- 1st Prize: Jing Zhao, China
- 2nd Prize: Alexander Bouzlov, Russia
- 3rd Prize: Alexander Chaushian, Armenia/Great Britain

Horn

- 1st Prize: Szabolcs Zempléní, Hungary
- 2nd Prizes (shared): Louis-Philippe Marsolais, Canada; Renate Hupka, Germany
- 3rd Prize: Christoph Eß, Germany

Piano Duo

- 2nd Prizes (shared): Victor y Luis del Valle, Spain; Piano Duo Poskute – Daukantas, Lithuania
- 3rd Prize: Silivanova – Puryzhinskiy, Russia

2006

Voice/Opera

- 1st Prize: Jun Mo Yang, Korea
- 2nd Prize: Joshua Hopkins, Canada
- 3rd Prizes (shared): Ilse Eerens, Belgium; Anna Kasyan, Armenia

Voice/Lied

- 2nd Prizes (shared): Roxana Constantinescu, Rumania; Carolina Ullrich, Chile/Germany
- 3rd Prizes (shared): Colin Balzer, Canada; Peter Schöne, Germany

Piano

- 1st Prize: Benjamin Kim, USA
- 2nd Prizes (shared): Hisako Kawamura, Japan; Marianna Shirinyan, Armenia

Wind Quintet

- 1st Prize: Quintette Aquilon, France
- 2nd Prize: Quintett Chantily, Germany/Hungary/Russia/Finland
- 3rd Prize: Weimarer Bläserquintett, Germany

2007

Oboe

- 1st Prize: Ramón Ortega Quero, Spain
- 2nd Prize: Ivan Podyomov, Russia
- 3rd Prize: Maria Sournatcheva, Russia

Trombone

- 1st Prize: Fabrice Millischer, France
- 2nd Prize: Frederic Belli, Germany
- 3rd Prize: Juan Carlos Matamoros, Spain

Percussion

- 1st Prize: Johannes Fischer, Germany
- 2nd Prize: Vassilena Serafimova, Bulgaria

Piano Trio

- 1st Prize: Tecchler Trio, Switzerland/Germany
- 2nd Prize: Morgenstern Trio, Germany/France
- 3rd Prize: Trio Cérès, France

2008

Viola

- 2nd Prize: Wen Xiao Zheng, China
- 3rd Prize: Teng Li, China

Clarinet

- 1st Prize: Sebastian Manz, Germany
- 3rd Prizes (shared): Shelly Ezra, Israel; Taira Kaneko, Japan

Bassoon

- 2nd Prizes (shared): Christian Kunert, Germany; Philipp Tutzer, Italy
- 3rd Prize: Václav Vonášek, Czech Republic
- Bärenreiter Prize for the Best Interpretation of the Commissioned Work: Julien Hardy, France

String Quartet

- 1st Prize: Apollon Musagete Quartett, Poland
- 2nd Prize: Afiara String Quartet, Canada
- 3rd Prizes (shared): Gémeaux Quartet, Germany/Switzerland; Verus String Quartet, Japan

2009

Violin

- 1st Prize: Hyeyoon Park, Korea
- 2nd Prize: Kei Shirai, Japan
- 3rd Prize: Lily Francis, USA

Double Bass

- 1st Prize: Gunars Upatnieks, Latvia
- 2nd Prize: Stanislau Anishchanka, Belarus
- 3rd Prizes (shared): Olivier Thiery, France; Ivan Zavgorodniy, Ukraine

Voice

- 1st Prize: Anita Watson, Australia
- 2nd Prize: Sunyoung Seo, Korea; Wilhelm Schwinghammer, Germany
- 3rd Prize: Hye Jung Lee, Korea; Falko Hönisch, Germany

=== 2010s ===
2010

Flute

- 1st Prize: Loïc Schneider, France
- 2nd Prize: Daniela Koch, Austria
- 3rd Prize: Sooyun Kim, South Korea/USA
- BR Klassik Prize: Ivannay Ternay, Ukraine

Cello

- 1st Prize: Julian Steckel, Germany
- 2nd Prize: Gen Yokosawa, Japan
- 3rd Prize: Tristan Cornut, France

Horn

- 1st Prize: Přemysl Vojta, Czech Republic
- 2nd Prizes (shared): Dániel Ember, Hungary; Paolo Mendes, Germany

Piano Duo

- 2nd Prize: Hyun Joo & Hee Jin June – Remnant Piano Duo, South Korea
- 3rd Prize: Susan & Sarah Wang – DoubleWang Duo, USA
- Special Prize: Pianoduo Groebner & Trisko, Austria

2011

Oboe

- 2nd Prizes (shared): Philippe Tondre, France, with Public Prize; Ivan Podyomov, Russia
- 3rd Prize: Cristina Gómez Godoy, Spain; Marc Lachat, France

Organ

- 1st Prize: Schöch, Austria
- 2nd Prize: Anna-Victoria Baltrusch, German
- 3rd Prize: Lukas Stollhof, Dutch

Trumpet

- 1st Prize: Manuel Blanco Gómez-Limón, Spain
- 2nd Prize: Alexandre Baty, France
- 3rd Prize: Ferenc Mausz, Hungary, with Public Prize

Piano

- 1st Prize: Alexej Gorlatch, Ukraine, with Public Prize
- 2nd Prize: Tori Huang (Claire Huangci), USA
- 3rd Prize: Dasol Kim, South Korea
- Special Prizes: EunAe Lee, South Korea

2012

Voice (male)

- 2nd Prizes (shared): Dashon Burton, USA; Hansung Yoo, South Korea, with Public Prize
- 3rd Prize: Kyubong Lee, South Korea

Voice (female)

- 1st Prize: Olena Tokar, Ukraine
- 2nd Prizes (shared): Sumi Hwang, South Korea; Anna Sohn, South Korea
- 3rd Prize: Sophia Christine Brommer, Germany, with Public Prize

Clarinet

- 2nd Prizes (shared): Sergey Eletskiy, Russia; Stojan Krkuleski, Serbia, with Public Prize; Annelien Van Wauwe, Belgium

String Quartet

- 1st Prize: Armida Quartet, Germany, with Public Prize
- 2nd Prize: Novus String Quartet, South Korea
- 3rd Prize: Calidore String Quartet, USA/Canada

2013

Violin

- 2nd Prizes (shared): Bomsori Kim, South Korea; Christel Lee, USA, with Public Prize
- Special Prize of the Munich Chamber Orchestra: Diana Tishchenko, Ukraine

Viola

- 1st Prize: Yura Lee, South Korea
- 2nd Prize: Kyoungmin Park, South Korea, with Public Prize
- 3rd Prize: Katarzyna Budnik-Gałązka, Poland
- Prize for the Best Interpretation of the Commissioned Work: Adrien Boisseau, France
- Special Prize of the Henning Tögel Talent Foundation for Outstanding Talents: Lydia Rinecker, Germany

Bassoon

- 2nd Prizes : Rie Koyama, Japan, with Prize for the Best Interpretation of the Commissioned Work
- 3rd Prize: María José Rielo Blanco, Spain, with BR-Klassik Online-Preis

Piano Trio

- 2nd Prizes (shared): Van Baerle Trio, Netherlands, with Public Prize; Trio Karénine, France, with Prize for the Best Interpretation of the Commissioned Work

2014

Percussion

- 1. Prize: Simone Rubino (Italy), Public Prize, Brüder Busch Prize
- 2. Prize: Alexej Gerassimez (Germany), Special Prize for the Best Interpretation of the Commissioned Work
- 3. Prize: Christoph Sietzen (Luxembourg )
- Special Prize U21: Vivi Vassileva (Germany), Semifinal
- Special Prize of Mozart Gesellschaft München: Vivi Vassileva (Germany), Semifinal

Violoncello

- 1. Prize: István Várdai (Hungary)
- 2. Prize: Andrei Ioniță (Romania), Special Prize for the Best Interpretation of the Commissioned Work, Special Prize Premiertone-Website
- 3. Prize: Bruno Philippe (France), Public Prize
- Alice-Rosner-Prize for an excellent interpretation of G. Ligeti Sonate for Violoncello solo: Pablo Ferrández (Spain), Semifinal
- Bärenreiter-Urtext-Prize: Alexey Zhilin, 2. Round

Wind Quintet

- 2. Prize: Azahar Ensemble (Spain), Public Prize, ifp-Musikpreis
- 3. Prize: Acelga Quintett (Germany/Luxembourg)
- 3. Prize: Quintette Klarthe (France), BR-KLASSIK Onlineprize, Special Prize Palazzetto Bru Zane
- Special Prize for the Best Interpretation of the Commissioned Work: Canorusquintett (Germany), Semifinal
- Prize of Jeunesses Musicales Germany: Canorusquintett (Germany), Semifinal
- Bärenreiter-Urtext-Prize: Arcadia Wind Quintet (Venezuela), 1. Round

Piano

- 2. Prize: Chi-Ho Han (South Korea), Publik Prize, Special Prize for the Best Interpretation of the Commissioned Work
- 3. Prize: Kang-Un Kim (South Korea), Osnabrücker Musikpreis
- 3. Prize: Florian Mitrea (Rumania), Special Prize Münchener Kammerorchester
- Bärenreiter-Urtext-Prize: Nadjezda Pisareva (Russia), 2. Round

2015

Voice

- 1. Prize: Emalie Savoy (USA), Special Prize "Orpheus", Special Prize GENUIN classics
- 2. Prize: Sooyeon Lee (South Korea), Public Prize
- 3. Prize: Marion Lebegue (France), Special Prize for the Best Interpretation of the Commissioned Work
- Bärenreiter-Urtext-Prize: Jae Eun Park (South Korea)

Trombone

- 1. Prize: Michael Buchanan (Great Britain), Public Prize
- 2. Prize: Jonathan Reith, (France)
- 3. Prize: Guilhem Kusnierek (France)
- Special Prize of Mozart Gesellschaft München: Juan González Moreno (Spain), Semifinal
- Special Prize for the Best Interpretation of the Commissioned Work: José Milton Vieira Leite Filho (Brasil)

Piano Duo

- 1. Prize: Alina Shalamova & Nikolay Shalamov (Bulgaria/Russia), Public Prize, Special Prize for the Best Interpretation of the Commissioned Work, ifp-Musikpreis
- 2. Prize: Duo Ani und Nia Sulkhanishvili (Georgia)
- 2. Prize: Duo ShinPark (South Korea)
- 3. Prize: Piano Duo Lok Ping & Lok Ting Chau (Hong Kong)
- Bärenreiter-Urtext-Prize: Piano Duo Chen – Armand (France/South Korea), Semifinal
- Special Prize U21: Piano Duo Chen – Armand (France/South Korea), Semifinal

Flute

- 1. Prize: Sébastian Jacot (Switzerland ), Special Prize from Münchener Kammerorchester, Brüder-Busch-Prize, Osnabrücker Musikpreis
- 2. Prize: Francisco López Martín (Spain), Public Prize, Special Prize for the Best Interpretation of the Commissioned Work, BR-KLASSIK Online-Prize
- 3. Prize: Eduardo Belmar (Spain)
- Bärenreiter-Urtext-Prize: Othonas Gkogkas (Greece)
- Alice-Rosner-Prize: For an excellent interpretation of Heinz Holliger Sonate (in)solit(air)e: Mayuko Akimoto (Japan)

2016

Harp

- 1. Prize: Agnès Clément (France), Publik Prize, Special Prize for the Best Interpretation of the Commissioned Work
- 2. Prize: Anaïs Gaudemard (France), Special Prize from Münchener Kammerorchester
- 3. Prize: Rino Kageyama (Japan)
- Special Prize of Mozart-Gesellschaft München: Magdalena Hoffmann (Germany), Semifinal
- Special Prize U21: Magdalena Hoffmann (Germany), Semifinal
- Bärenreiter-Urtext-Prize: Marika Cecilia Riedl (Germany)

Horn

- 2. Prize: Marc Gruber (Germany), Publik Prize, Brüder-Busch-Prize
- 2. Prize: Kateřina Javůrková (Czech Republic), BR-KLASSIK Online-Preis
- 3. Prize: Félix Dervaux (France), Special Prize for the Best Interpretation of the Commissioned Work
- 3. Prize: Nicolas Ramez (France)
- Bärenreiter-Urtext-Prize: Nicolás Gómez Naval (Spain)

Double Bass

- 1. Prize: Wies de Boevé (Belgium), Publik Prize, ifp-Musikpreis
- 2. Prize: Michael Karg (Germany)
- 3. Prize: Dominik Wagner (Germany/Austria), Special Prize of Andreas-Wilfer-Meisterwerkstatt building Cellos and doublebasses
- Special Prize for the Best Interpretation of the Commissioned Work: Michail-Pavlos Semsis (Greece)
- Bärenreiter-Urtext-Prize: Marek Romanowski (Poland)

String Quartet

- 1. Prize: Quatuor Arod (France), IDAGIO-Onlinepreis
- 2. Prize: Aris Quartett (Germany), Publik Prize, Special Prize GENUIN classics, Special Prize ProQuartet, Osnabrücker Musikpreis
- 3. Prize: Quartet Amabile (Japan), Special Prize for the Best Interpretation of the Commissioned Work
- Bärenreiter-Urtext-Prize: Quatuor Hanson (France/Great Britain)
- Alice-Rosner-Preis: For an excellent interpretation of Streichquartett nr. 1 from György Ligeti: Quatuor Arod (France)
- Prize of Jeunesses Musicales Germany: Giocoso Streichquartett Vienna
- Prize of Karl-Klingler-Stiftung: Goldmund Quartett (Germany)

2017

Violin

- 2. Prize: Sarah Christian, Germany, Public Prize, Special Prize from Münchener Kammerorchesters, Henle-Urtextpreis
- 2. Prize: Andrea Obiso, Italy, Special Prize for the Best Interpretation of the Commissioned Work, Henle-Urtextpreis
- 3. Prize: Kristīne Balanas, Latvia, Henle-Urtextpreis

Piano

- 1. Prize: JeungBeum Sohn, South Korea, Henle-Urtextpreis
- 2. Prize: Fabian Müller, Germany, Public Prize, Brüder-Busch-Prize, Henle-Urtextpreis, Special Prize GENUIN classics
- 3. Prize: Wataru Hisasue, Japan, Special Prize for the Best Interpretation of the Commissioned Work, Henle-Urtextpreis

Guitar

- 2. Prize: Junhong Kuang, China, Public Prize, ifp-Musikpreis
- 2. Prize: Davide Giovanni Tomasi, Italy/Switzerland
- 3. Prize: Andrey Lebedev, Australia, Special Prize for the Best Interpretation of the Commissioned Work

Oboe

- 2. Prize: Kyeong Ham, South Korea, BR-KLASSIK Online-Preis
- 2. Prize: Thomas Hutchinson, New Zealand, Special Prize for the Best Interpretation of the Commissioned Work
- 2. Prize: Juliana Koch, Germany, Public Prize, Osnabrücker Musikpreis

2018

Voice

- 1st Prize: Natalya Boeva, Russia
- 2nd Prize: Milan Siljanov, Switzerland
- 3rd Prize: Mingjie Lei, China
- 3rd Prize: Ylva Sofia Stenberg, Sweden

Trumpet

- 1st Prize Selina Ott, Austria
- 2nd Prize: Célestin Guérin, France
- 2nd Prize: Mihály Könyves-Tóth, Hungary
- 3rd Prize: (not awarded)

Piano Trio

- 1st Prize: Aoi Trio, Japan
- 2nd Prize: (not awarded)
- 3rd Prize: Trio Marvin, Kazakhstan / Russia / Germany
- 3rd Prize: Lux Trio, Korea

Viola

- 1st Prize: Diyang Mei, China, Public Prize, Special prize for the interpretation of the commissioned composition, Special Prize by the Munich Chamber Orchestra, Osnabrück Music Prize, Special Prize GENUIN classics
- 2nd Prize: Yucheng Shi, China
- 3rd Prize: Takehiro Konoe, Japan

2019

Violoncello

- 1st Prize: Haruma Sato, Japan
- 2nd Prize: Friedrich Thiele, Germany
- 3rd Prize: Sihao He, China

Bassoon

- 2nd Prize: Andrea Cellacchi, Italy
- 2nd Prize: Mathis Stier, Germany
- 3rd Prize: Theo Plath, Germany

Clarinet

- 1st Prize: Joë Christophe, France
- 2nd Prize: Carlos Alexandre Brito Ferreira, Portugal
- 2nd Prize: Han Kim, South Korea

Percussion

- 1st Prize: Kai Strobel, Germany
- 2nd Prize: Aurélien Gignoux, France/Switzerland
- 3rd Prize: Weiqi Bai, China

=== 2021 ===
Horn

- 1st prize: Pascal Deuber
- 2nd prize: Yun Zeng
- 3rd prize: Ivo Dudler

Piano duo

- 1st prize: Geister Duo
- 2nd prize: Duo Melnikova-Morozova
- 2nd prize: La Fiammata
- 3rd prize: Piano Duo Sakamoto

Violin

- 1st prize: Seiji Okamoto
- 2nd prize: Dmitry Smirnov
- 3rd prize: Alexandra Tirsu

Voice

- 1st prize: Anastasiya Taratorkina
- 3rd prize: Jeongmeen Ahn
- 3rd prize: Valerie Eickhoff
- 3rd prize: Julia Grüter

=== 2022 ===
Flute

- 1st prize: Yubeen Kim
- 2nd prize: Mario Bruno
- 3rd prize: Leonie Virginia Bumüller

Piano

- 1st prize: Lukas Sternath
- 2nd prize: Junhyung Kim
- 3rd prize: Johannes Obermeier

String quartet

- 1st prize: Barbican Quartet
- 2nd prize: Quartet Integra
- 3rd prize: Chaos String Quartet

Trombone

- 1st prize: Kris Garfitt
- 2nd prize: Jonathon Ramsay
- 3rd prize: Roberto de la Guía Martínez

=== 2023 ===
Double bass

- 1st prize: Gabriel Polinsky
- 2nd prize: Hongyiu Thomas Lai
- 3rd prize: José Trigo

Harp

- 1st prize: Tjasha Gafner
- 2nd prize: Alexandra Bidi
- 2nd prize: Lea Maria Löffler

Piano trio

- 1st prize: Trio Orelon
- 2nd prize: Amelio Trio
- 3rd prize: Trio Pantoum

Viola

- 1st prize: Haesue Lee
- 3rd prize: Ionel Ungureanu

=== 2024 ===
Brass quintet

- 1st prize: Alinde Quintet
- 2nd prize: Pacific Quintet
- 3rd prize: Nevsky Wind Quintet
- 3rd prize: SenArts Wind Quintet

Oboe

- 1st prize: Surkov Leonid
- 2nd prize: Ilyes Boufadden Adloff
- 3rd prize: João Miguel Moreira da Silva
- 3rd prize: Omer-Itzhak Posti

Violoncello

- 1st prize: Maria Zaitseva
- 2nd prize: Krzysztof Michalski
- 3rd prize: Alexander Warenberg

Voice

- 1st prize: Samueol Park
- 2nd prize: Aurora Marthens
- 3rd prize: Mira Alkhovik

=== 2025 ===
Clarinet

- First Prize 15.000 €: Elad Navon
- Second Prize 10.000 €: Hongyi Jiang
- Third Prize 5.000 €: Lev Zhuravskii

Piano

- First Prize 15.000 €: Liya Wang
- Second Prize 10.000 €: Elias Ackerley
- Third Prize 5.000 €: Jiwon Yang

Trumpet

- First Prize 15.000 €: Robin Paillet
- Second Prize 10.000 €: Sandro Hirsch
- Third Prize 5.000 €: Raphaël Horrach

=== 2026 ===
Bassoon

- 1. Prize: Enrico Bassi, € 15.000
- 2. Prize: Jappe Dendievel, € 10.000
- 3. Prize: Laure Thomas, € 5.000

Organ

- 1. Prize: William Fielding, € 15.000
- 2. Prize: Alexis Grizard, € 10.000
- 3. Prize: Julian Emanuel Becker, € 5.000

Percussion

- 1. Prize: Gabriel Michaud, € 15.000
- 2. Prize: Yuan Xia, € 10.000

String Quartet

- 1. Prize: Viatores Quartet, € 30.000
- 3. Prize: Katarina String Quartet, € 18.000
- 3. Prize: Quartet Fugue, € 18.000

=== Prior 2000 ===
==== Piano ====
- 1952 Alberto Colombo Italy
- 1952 Laurence Davis Australia
- 1952 Peter Wallfisch Israel
- 1954 Ingrid Haebler Austria
- 1954 Fernande Kaeser Switzerland
- 1956 Robert-Alexander Bohnke FRG
- 1957 1. Prize Thérèse Dussaut France
- 1957 2. Prize Sumiko Inouchi Japan
- 1958 1. Prize Hans Eckart Besch FRG
- 1958 2. Prize Michael Ponti US
- 1958 2. Prize Dieter Weber Austria
- 1959 1. Prize Friedrich Wilhelm Schnurr FRG
- 1959 2. Prize Gernot Kahl FRG
- 1959 2. Prize Norman Shetler US
- 1961 2. Prize Pavica Gvozdić Yugoslavia
- 1961 3. Prize Alexandra Ablewicz Poland
- 1962 2. Prize Christoph Eschenbach FRG
- 1962 3. Prize Milena Mollova Bulgaria
- 1963 2. Prize Edith Fischer Switzerland
- 1965 1. Prize Judith Burganger US
- 1965 3. Prize Dag Achatz Sweden
- 1966 1. Prize Claude Savard France
- 1966 3. Prize Mitsuko Uchida Japan
- 1967 3. Prize Anthony Goldstone UK
- 1967 3. Prize Valery Kastelsky USSR
- 1968 1. Prize Anne Queffélec France
- 1969 2. Prize Erika Lux Hungary
- 1969 3. Prize Piotr Paleczny Poland
- 1970 2. Prize André De Groote Belgium
- 1971 2. Prize Marian Migdal Poland
- 1971 2. Prize Martino Tirimo UK
- 1972 1. Prize Chen Pi-hsien Taiwan
- 1972 3. Prize Roland Keller FRG
- 1973 1. Prize James Tocco US
- 1973 2. Prize Myung-whun Chung Korea
- 1975 1. Prize Diane Walsh US
- 1975 2. Prize Natasha Tadson Israel
- 1975 3. Prize Nina Tichman US
- 1979 1. Prize Hans-Christian Wille FRG
- 1979 2. Prize Marioara Trifan US
- 1981 3. Prize Rolf Plagge FRG
- 1983 1. Prize Kei Itoh Japan
- 1983 3. Prize Andrei Nikolsky USSR
- 1983 3. Prize Hai-Kyung Suh Korea
- 1985 1. Prize Kalle Randalu USSR
- 1985 2. Prize Daniel Gortler Israel
- 1987 2. Prize Ricardo Castro Brazil
- 1987 2. Prize Bernd Glemser FRG
- 1987 3. Prize Thomas Duis FRG
- 1989 1. Prize Susanne Grützmann GDR
- 1989 2. Prize Alexandre Tharaud France
- 1989 3. Prize Kyōko Tabe Japan
- 1991 2. Prize Momo Kodama Japan
- 1993 1. Prize Anna Malikova Russia
- 1995 3. Prize Claire-Marie Le Guay France
- 1997 3. Prize Etsuko Hirose Japan
- 1999 2. Prize Severin von Eckardstein Germany

==== Piano Duo ====
- 1955 Kurt Bauer / Heidi Bung West Germany
- 1955 Aloys and Alfons Kontarsky West Germany
- 1964 2. Prize Marie-José Billiard / Julien Azaïs France
- 1964 2. Prize Joanne and Joyce Weintraub US
- 1974 1. Prize Anthony & Joseph Paratore US
- 1974 2. Prize Elif and Bedii Aran Turkey
- 1974 3. Prize Marina Horak / Håkon Austbø Yugoslavia/Norway
- 1980 2. Prize Alexander and Natalia Bagdasarov USSR
- 1980 2. Prize Cameron Grant / James Winn US
- 1980 3. Prize Carlos Duarte / Varda Shamban Venezuela/Israel
- 1986 3. Prize Zsuzsanna Kollar / Gabriella Lang Hungary
- 1986 3. Prize Stenzl Pianoduo West Germany
- 1992 2. Prize Thomas Hecht / Sandra Shapiro US
- 1992 3. Prize Silke-Thora Matthies / Christian Köhn Germany
- 1996 2. Prize Irene Alexeytchuk / Yuri Kot Ukraine
- 1996 2. Prize Genova & Dimitrov Bulgaria

==== Organ ====
- 1957 1. Prize Franz Lehrndorfer West Germany
- 1957 2. Prize Viktor Lukas West Germany
- 1959 1. Prize Hedwig Bilgram West Germany
- 1959 2. Prize Lionel Rogg Switzerland
- 1962 1. Prize Wolfgang Sebastian Meyer West Germany
- 1962 2. Prize François Desbaillet Switzerland
- 1962 3. Prize Mireille Lagacé Canada
- 1966 2. Prize Cherry Rhodes US
- 1966 3. Prize Daniel Roth France
- 1966 3. Prize Günther Kaunzinger West Germany
- 1971 1. Prize Edgar Krapp West Germany
- 1971 3. Prize Charles Benbow US
- 1971 3. Prize Gerhard Weinberger West Germany
- 1975 2. Prize Klemens Schnorr West Germany
- 1975 3. Prize Martin Lücker West Germany
- 1979 2. Prize Ludger Lohmann West Germany
- 1979 3. Prize Karol Gołębiowski Poland
- 1987 2. Prize Heidi Emmert West Germany
- 1987 2. Prize Martin Sander West Germany
- 1987 3. Prize Stefan Palm West Germany
- 1994 2. Prize Ariane Metz Germany
- 1994 3. Prize Leonhard Amselgruber Germany
- 1999 2. Prize Martin Kaleschke Germany

==== Harpsichord ====
- 1956 2. Prize Zuzana Ruzickova Czechoslovakia
- 1958 1. Prize Vera Schwarz Austria
- 1964 2. Prize William Read US
- 1964 3. Prize Gottfried Bach West Germany
- 1964 3. Prize Jörg Ewald Dähler Switzerland
- 1970 2. Prize Martha Brickman Canada
- 1984 1. Prize Władysław Marek Kłosiewicz Poland

==== Voice ====
- 1954 Margit Kobeck FRG
- 1955 Johannes Wilbrink Netherlands
- 1957 1. Prize Jadwiga Románska Poland
- 1958 2. Prize Demeter Marczis Hungary
- 1958 2. Prize Jacques Villisech France
- 1960 1. Prize Ivan Rebroff FRG
- 1960 2. Prize Annabelle Bernard US
- 1960 2. Prize Raymond Michalski US
- 1960 3. Prize Teresa Żylis-Gara Poland
- 1960 4. Prize Thomas Carey US
- 1961 1. Prize George Fortune US
- 1961 3. Prize Benjamin Luxon UK
- 1962 1. Prize Delfina Ambroziak Poland
- 1962 1. Prize Kenneth John Bowen UK
- 1962 2. Prize Franco Bordoni Italy
- 1963 1. Prize Jules Bastin Belgium
- 1963 1. Prize Veronica Tyler US
- 1964 3. Prize Ljiljana Molnar Yugoslavia
- 1964 Concert Prize Max van Egmond Netherlands
- 1964 Lied Prize Bruce Abel US
- 1965 1. Prize Althea Bridges Australia
- 1965 2. Prize Teresa Wojtaszek-Kubiak Poland
- 1966 1. Prize Ileana Cotrubaș Romania
- 1966 1. Prize Denis Korolev USSR
- 1966 2. Prize Siegmund Nimsgern FRG
- 1967 1. Prize Knut Skram Norway
- 1967 3. Prize Joan Carden Australia
- 1968 1. Prize Jessye Norman US
- 1968 1. Prize Michael Schopper FRG
- 1970 3. Prize Victor von Halem FRG
- 1971 2. Prize Anita Terzian US
- 1972 1. Prize Robert Holl Netherlands
- 1972 3. Prize Otoniel Gonzaga Philippines
- 1972 3. Prize Edith Guillaume Denmark
- 1974 1. Prize Margaret Anne Marshall UK
- 1974 2. Prize Hanns-Friedrich Kunz FRG
- 1974 3. Prize Francisco Araiza Mexico
- 1976 2. Prize Mitsuko Shirai Japan
- 1978 2. Prize Zehava Gal Israel
- 1980 1. Prize Yoshie Tanaka Japan
- 1980 2. Prize Edith Wiens Canada
- 1980 3. Prize Pamela Coburn US
- 1982 1. Prize Kaaren Erickson US
- 1982 2. Prize Anne Sofie von Otter Sweden
- 1984 3. Prize Ian Christopher Smith, Trinidad and Tobago
- 1986 1. Prize Barbara Kilduff US
- 1986 1. Prize Derek Lee Ragin US
- 1986 2. Prize Masako Saida Japan
- 1988 1. Prize Thomas Quasthoff FRG
- 1988 2. Prize Lívia Ághová ČSSR
- 1990 1. Prize Andrzej Dobber Poland
- 1990 1. Prize Elena Moșuc Romania
- 1990 2. Prize Oliver Widmer Switzerland
- 1990 3. Prize Bodil Arnesen Norway
- 1992 2. Prize Melinda Paulsen US
- 1994 1. Prize Urszula Kryger Poland
- 1994 2. Prize Christian Elsner Germany
- 1996 2. Prize Anna Korondi Hungary
- 1996 2. Prize Hanno Müller-Brachmann Germany

==== Violin ====
- 1953 Igor Ozim Yugoslavia
- 1956 Edith Peinemann West Germany
- 1958 2. Prize Oscar Yatco Philippines
- 1961 2. Prize Yossi Zivoni Israel
- 1961 3. Prize Gerhard Hetzel West Germany
- 1966 1. Prize Konstanty Kulka Poland
- 1966 2. Prize Isabella Petrosian USSR
- 1966 3. Prize Yuri Mazurkevich USSR
- 1969 2. Prize Cristiano Rossi Italy
- 1969 2. Prize Masako Yanagita Japan
- 1969 3. Prize Emmy Verhey Netherlands
- 1972 2. Prize Nilla Pierrou Sweden
- 1972 3. Prize Ernst Kovačič Austria
- 1975 2. Prize Dora Schwarzberg Israel
- 1975 3. Prize Kaja Danczowska Poland
- 1975 3. Prize Eugen Sârbu Romania
- 1978 3. Prize Olivier Charlier France
- 1978 3. Prize Irina Tseitlin stateless
- 1981 2. Prize Gwen Hoebig Canada
- 1981 3. Prize Florian Sonnleitner West Germany
- 1984 1. Prize Takumi Kubota Japan
- 1984 2. Prize Christian Tetzlaff West Germany
- 1984 3. Prize Peter Matzka US
- 1988 2. Prize Mi-kyung Lee Korea
- 1988 3. Prize Sonig Tchakerian Italy
- 1992 2. Prize Erez Ofer Israel
- 1992 3. Prize Pavel Šporcl ČSSR
- 1992 3. Prize Scott St. John Canada
- 1995 1. Prize Piotr Pławner Poland
- 1995 2. Prize Bettina Gradinger Austria
- 1999 2. Prize Bin Huang China
- 1999 3. Prize Andrei Bielov Ukraine
- 1999 3. Prize Francesco Manara Italy

==== Violin Duo ====
- 1953 Ronald Woodcock / Lamar Crowson Australia/US
- 1955 Renato Giangrandi / Arlette Eggmann Italy
- 1956 Alan Grishman / Joel Ryce US
- 1957 1. Prize György Pauk/Peter Frankl Hungary
- 1957 2. Prize Thomas Brandis / Robert Henry West Germany/US
- 1960 2. Prize Albert Kocsis / Zsuzsanna Szabó Hungary
- 1960 3. Prize Joseph and Arlene Pach Canada
- 1963 1. Prize Clara Bonaldi / Sylvaine Billier France
- 1963 2. Prize Gerhard Hetzel / Ramón Walter West Germany/Switzerland
- 1963 3. Prize Andrew Dawes / Marylou Kolbinson Canada
- 1968 2. Prize Rolf Schulte/ Taoko Ouchi West Germany/Japan
- 1968 2. Prize Donald Weilerstein / Susan Halligan US
- 1968 3. Prize Takahiro Muroya / Naoyuki Inoue Japan
- 1971 1. Prize Levon Chilingirian / Clifford Benson UK
- 1971 2. Prize Isidora Schwarzberg / Boris Petrushansky USSR
- 1971 3. Prize Ildikó Bán / Katalin Váradi Hungary
- 1974 3. Prize Mirosław Ławrynowicz / Krystyna Makowska Poland
- 1974 3. Prize John and Dorothee Snow UK
- 1979 2. Prize Pavel Vernikov / Konstantin Bogino USSR
- 1979 3. Prize Peter and Gabriel Rosenberg West Germany
- 1983 2. Prize Peter Matzka /Teresa Turner-Jones US
- 1983 3. Prize Kazuki and Emiko Sawa Japan
- 1990 1. Prize Hagai Shaham / Arnon Erez Israel
- 1990 2. Prize Mayumi Seiler / Tünde Kurucz Austria/Hungary
- 1998 2. Prize Ariadne Daskalakis / Miri Yampolsky US/Israel
- 1998 3. Prize Akiko Tanaka / Evgeny Sinaiski Japan/Russia
- 1998 3. Prize Marco Rogliano / Maurizio Paciariello Italy

==== Viola ====
- 1962 3. Prize Hermann Voss West Germany
- 1967 2. Prize Nobuko Imai Japan
- 1971 1. Prize Vladimir Stopitschev USSR
- 1971 2. Prize Rainer Moog West Germany
- 1971 3. Prize Uri Mayer Israel
- 1976 1. Prize Yuri Bashmet USSR
- 1976 2. Prize Wolfram Christ West Germany
- 1980 2. Prize Johannes Flieder Austria
- 1980 3. Prize Kim Kashkashian US
- 1983 2. Prize Barbara Westphal West Germany
- 1989 2. Prize Hideko Kobayashi Japan
- 1989 3. Prize Roberto Díaz Chile
- 1993 2. Prize Hsin-Yun Huang Taiwan
- 1993 3. Prize Gilad Karni Israel
- 1997 1. Prize Naoko Shimizu Japan
- 1997 2. Prize Cathy Basrak US

==== Cello ====
- 1957 1. Prize Georg Donderer West Germany
- 1957 2. Prize Leslie Parnas US
- 1963 2. Prize Tsuyoshi Tsutsumi Japan
- 1963 3. Prize Raphael Sommer Israel
- 1968 2. Prize Valentin Erben Austria
- 1968 3. Prize Geneviève Teulières France
- 1973 2. Prize Denis Brott Canada
- 1973 2. Prize Jean Deplace France
- 1973 3. Prize Frans Helmerson Sweden
- 1977 1. Prize Antônio Meneses Brasil
- 1977 3. Prize Georg Faust West Germany
- 1982 2. Prize Alexander Baillie UK
- 1982 2. Prize Young-Chang Cho Korea
- 1986 2. Prize Michal Kaňka ČSSR
- 1986 2. Prize Gustav Rivinius West Germany
- 1986 3. Prize Jean-Guihen Queyras France
- 1990 2. Prize Alban Gerhardt West Germany
- 1990 2. Prize Michael Sanderling GDR
- 1990 3. Prize Ludwig Quandt West Germany
- 1994 1. Prize Jens Peter Maintz Germany
- 1994 2. Prize Tatjana Vassiljeva Russia
- 1994 3. Prize Tanja Tetzlaff Germany
- 1998 2. Prize Niklas Eppinger Germany
- 1998 3. Prize Sol Gabetta Argentina

==== Bass ====
- 1979 2. Prize Michinori Bunya Japan
- 1979 3. Prize Jiři Hudec ČSSR
- 1979 3. Prize Josef Niederhammer Austra
- 1985 2. Prize Esko Laine Finland
- 1985 2. Prize Dorin Marc Romenia
- 1985 3. Prize Håkan Ehren Norway
- 1991 2. Prize Giuseppe Ettore Italy
- 1991 3. Prize Janne Saksala Finland

==== Flute ====
- 1953 Peter-Lukas Graf Switzerland
- 1953 Konrad Hampe West Germany
- 1960 1. Prize Paul Meisen West Germany
- 1960 2. Prize Michel Debost France
- 1960 2. Prize Hirohiko Kato Japan
- 1964 2. Prize Michel Debost France
- 1964 2. Prize Paula Robison (née Sylvester) US
- 1964 3. Prize Sylvia Navarro Uruguay
- 1970 2. Prize Valentin Zverev USSR
- 1970 3. Prize Gunther Pohl West Germany
- 1974 2. Prize Abbie de Quant Netherlands
- 1974 2. Prize Roswitha Staege West Germany
- 1974 3. Prize Irena Grafenauer Yugoslavia
- 1979 2. Prize Irena Grafenauer Yugoslavia
- 1979 3. Prize Shigenori Kudo Japan
- 1985 3. Prize Gaby Pas-Van Riet Netherlands
- 1990 1. Prize Petri Alanko Finland
- 1990 2. Prize Michael Martin Kofler Austria
- 1995 2. Prize Davide Formisano Italy
- 1995 2. Prize Sabine Kittel Germany

==== Oboe ====
- 1954 Gaston Maugras France
- 1961 1. Prize Heinz Holliger Switzerland
- 1961 2. Prize André Lardrot France
- 1961 3. Prize Maurice Bourgue France
- 1967 1. Prize Maurice Bourgue France
- 1967 3. Prize Anatoly Lyubimov USSR
- 1972 2. Prize Hansjörg Schellenberger West Germany
- 1976 3. Prize Thomas Indermühle Switzerland
- 1981 2. Prize Klaus Becker West Germany
- 1981 3. Prize David Walter France
- 1986 2. Prize Volkmar Schöller West Germany
- 1986 3. Prize Nicholas Daniel UK
- 1986 3. Prize Fabian Menzel West Germany
- 1991 2. Prize François Leleux France
- 1991 3. Prize Washington Barella Brasil
- 1996 2. Prize Stefan Schilli Germany
- 1996 3. Prize Clara Dent Austria
- 1996 3. Prize Dominik Wollenweber Germany

==== Bassoon ====
- 1954 André Rabot France
- 1958 2. Prize Gábor Janota Hungary
- 1965 3. Prize Klaus Thunemann West Germany
- 1975 2. Prize Jiři Seidl ČSSR
- 1984 2. Prize Dag Jensen Norway
- 1984 3. Prize Holger Straube GDR
- 1990 2. Prize Sergio Azzolini Italy
- 1990 2. Prize Dag Jensen Norway

==== Clarinet ====
- 1954 Norbert Bourdon France
- 1957 1. Prize Edmond Boulanger France
- 1957 2. Prize Karl Leister West Germany
- 1962 2. Prize Karl Leister West Germany
- 1968 1. Prize Franklin Cohen US
- 1968 3. Prize Kurt Weber Switzerland
- 1973 3. Prize Rainer Schumacher West Germany
- 1977 3. Prize Claude Faucomprez France
- 1977 3. Prize David Shifrin US
- 1982 2. Prize Philippe Cuper France
- 1982 2. Prize Charles Neidich US
- 1982 3. Prize John Bruce Yeh US
- 1987 2. Prize Anna-Maija Korsimaa Finland
- 1987 3. Prize Fabrizio Meloni Italy
- 1987 3. Prize Richard Rimbert France
- 1992 2. Prize Sharon Kam Israel
- 1992 3. Prize Alessandro Carbonare Italy
- 1998 3. Prize Nicolas Baldeyrou France

==== Trumpet ====
- 1958 2. Prize Werner Roelstraete Belgium
- 1963 1. Prize Maurice Jean André France
- 1963 3. Prize Francis Marcel Hardy France
- 1971 2. Prize Janis Marshelle Coffman US
- 1971 2. Prize Guy Michel Touvron France
- 1980 2. Prize Richard Steuart Canada
- 1980 3. Prize Ketil Christensen Denmark
- 1986 2. Prize Reinhold Friedrich West Germany
- 1986 3. Prize Urban Agnas Sweden
- 1986 3. Prize George Vosburgh US
- 1993 2. Prize Wolfgang Bauer Germany
- 1993 3. Prize Jens Lindemann Canada
- 1997 3. Prize Gábor Boldoczki Hungary
- 1997 3. Prize Olivier Theurillat France

==== Horn ====
- 1956 Gerd Seifert West Germany
- 1960 2. Prize Josef Brazda ČSSR
- 1960 2. Prize Peter Damm GDR
- 1960 3. Prize Jaroslav Kotulan ČSSR
- 1960 3. Prize Hans Helfried Richter West Germany
- 1964 1. Prize Hermann Baumann West Germany
- 1964 2. Prize Ferenc Tarjáni Hungary
- 1964 3. Prize Jaroslav Kotulan ČSSR
- 1969 1. Prize Norbert Hauptmann West Germany
- 1969 2. Prize Zdeněk Tylšar ČSSR
- 1969 3. Prize Pavel Jevstignejev USSR
- 1973 2. Prize Johannes Ritzkowsky West Germany
- 1973 3. Prize Vladimíra Bouchalová ČSSR
- 1973 3. Prize Vladislav Grigorov Bulgaria
- 1978 2. Prize John MacDonald Canada
- 1978 3. Prize Zdeněk Divoký ČSSR
- 1978 3. Prize James Ross US
- 1983 1. Prize Radovan Vlatković Yugoslavia
- 1983 3. Prize Marie-Luise Neunecker West Germany
- 1983 3. Prize Corbin Wagner US
- 1988 2. Prize Jindřich Petráš ČSSR
- 1988 2. Prize James Sommerville Canada
- 1988 3. Prize Geoffrey Bain Winter US
- 1994 1. Prize Radek Baborák ČSSR
- 1994 2. Prize Markus L. Frank Germany
- 1994 3. Prize Markus Maskuniitty Finland
- 1999 2. Prize Alessio Allegrini Italy
- 1999 2. Prize László Seemann Hungary
- 1999 3. Prize Sibylle Mahni Switzerland

==== Trombone ====
- 1965 2. Prize Jean-Pierre Mathieu France
- 1965 2. Prize Zdeněk Pulec ČSSR
- 1974 2. Prize Ronald Barron US
- 1974 2. Prize Branimir Slokar Yugoslavia
- 1974 3. Prize Michel Becquet France
- 1981 2. Prize Michel Becquet France
- 1981 2. Prize Michael Mulcahy Australia
- 1981 3. Prize Gilles Millière France
- 1989 2. Prize Jonas Krister Bylund Sweden
- 1989 3. Prize Heather Buchman US
- 1989 3. Prize Thomas Horch West Germany
- 1995 3. Prize András Fejér Hungary
- 1995 3. Prize Jean Raffard France

==== String quartet ====
- 1959 2. Prize Weller Quartett Austria
- 1965 1. Prize Dimov Quartet Bulgaria
- 1965 2. Prize Bernède Quartet France
- 1970 1. Prize Tokyo String Quartet Japan
- 1973 3. Prize Wilanów Quartet Poland
- 1977 2. Prize Éder Quartett Hungary
- 1982 2. Prize Havlák Quartett ČSSR
- 1982 3. Prize Auryn Quartet West Germany
- 1987 2. Prize Parisii Quartet France
- 1987 2. Prize Petersen Quartet GDR
- 1991 2. Prize Mandelring Quartett Germany
- 1991 2. Prize Neues Leipziger Streichquartett Germany
- 1996 1. Prize Artemis Quartet Germany/Russia
- 1996 3. Prize Quatuor Castagneri France/Romania

==== Piano trio ====
- 1961 1. Prize Junges Wiener Trio Austra
- 1969 1. Prize Derevjanko Trio USSR
- 1969 2. Prize Bondurjanskij Trio USSR
- 1969 3. Prize Stuttgarter Klaviertrio West Germany
- 1976 3. Prize Oslo Trio Norway
- 1981 2. Prize Zingara Trio U.K.
- 1981 3. Prize Apollo Trio Korea/US
- 1981 3. Prize Grüneburg Trio West Germany
- 1988 2. Prize Trio Wanderer France
- 1995 1. Prize Trio Bartholdy France
- 1995 2. Prize Trio di Parma Italy
- 1998 2. Prize Clemente Trio Germany
- 1998 2. Prize Trio di Parma Italy

==== Wind quintet ====
- 1966 1. Prize Bläserquintett des Akademischen Kirov Theaters USSR
- 1966 2. Prize Akademisches Bläserquintett Prag ČSSR
- 1966 3. Prize Bläserquintett der Deutschen Oper Berlin West Germany
- 1975 2. Prize Syrinx Quintett West Germany
- 1975 3. Prize Bläserquintett der Jeunesses Musicales Budapest Hungary
- 1980 2. Prize Chalumeau Quintett West Germany
- 1980 2. Prize Nielsen Quintett France
- 1985 2. Prize Berliner Bläserquintett GDR
- 1985 3. Prize Albert Schweitzer Quintett West Germany
- 1985 3. Prize British Woodwind Quintet U.K.
- 1989 1. Prize Ma’a lot Quintett West Germany
- 1989 2. Prize Arcis Quintett West Germany
- 1989 3. Prize Kammervereinigung Berlin GDR
- 1993 2. Prize Quintetto Bibiena Italy
- 1993 2. Prize Quintette Debussy France
- 1993 3. Prize Kammervereinigung Berlin Germany
- 1997 1. Prize Afflatus Quintett ČSSR
- 1997 2. Prize Quintette Nocturne France
- 1997 3. Prize Orsolino Quintett Germany/Austra

==== Percussion ====
- 1977 2. Prize Sumire Yoshihara Japan
- 1977 3. Prize Midori Takada Japan
- 1985 1. Prize Peter Sadlo West Germany
- 1997 2. Prize Markus Leoson Sweden

==== Harp ====
- 1983 2. Prize Isabelle Moretti France

==== Guitar ====
- 1976 2. Prize Sharon Isbin US
- 1976 3. Prize Ricardo Fernández-Iznaola Venezuela
- 1982 2. Prize Stefano Grondona Italy
- 1982 2. Prize Timo Korhonen Finland
- 1982 3. Prize Thomas Müller-Pering West Germany
- 1989 1. Prize Luis Orlandini Chile
- 1989 3. Prize Miguel Charosky Argentina
- 1989 3. Prize Alexander Swete Austria
- 1993 2. Prize Joaquín de Jesús Clerch Diaz Cuba
- 1993 2. Prize Pablo Márquez Argentina

==== Recorder ====
- 1978 3. Prize Shigeharu Hirao-Yamaoka Japan
- 1978 3. Prize Michael Schneider West Germany
- 1988 2. Prize Robert Ehrlich U.K.
- 1988 2. Prize Carin van Heerden South Africa
- 1988 3. Prize Dan Laurin Sweden

==== Piano playing from the sheet ====
- 1963 1. reward Karl Bergemann West Germany
- 1963 2. reward Solange Robin-Chiapparin France
- 1963 3. reward Sylvaine Billier France
- 1965 2. reward Frank Maus West Germany
- 1965 2. reward Lucia Negro Italy
- 1965 3. reward Waldemar Strecke West Germany
