= Beethoven Ring =

German classical music award

- Awarded for: "ambitious younger generation classical musicians."
- Location: Bonn
- Country: Germany
- Presented by: "Citizens for Beethoven"
- Reward: Ring
- First award: 2004
- Website: www.buergerfuerbeethoven.de/start/Fuer-Musiker-Beethoven-Ring/index.html

Beethoven Ring is an annual award by the association "Citizens for Beethoven" of the city of Bonn. Bürger für Beethoven (Citizens for Beethoven) is Bonn’s largest cultural association. Its purpose is to promote Beethoven’s music and preserve his memory in the city of his birth. In a vote, the 1500 members of the "Citizens for Beethoven" determine one out of the five youngest artists at the Beethovenfest Bonn, that have interpreted a work of Beethoven. The official award ceremony takes place within the framework of a concert in the Beethoven-Haus. The ring is handcrafted as a unique piece from 18-karat rose gold and sterling silver.

Other Beethoven Rings were awarded by the Beethoven Society Vienna or the Wiener Musikakademie.

== Recipients ==
- 2004 Gustavo Dudamel
- 2005 Julia Fischer
- 2006 Lisa Batiashvili
- 2007 Giorgi Kharadze
- 2008 Lauma Skride
- 2009 Teo Gheorghiu
- 2010 Sergei Khachatryan
- 2011 Přemysl Vojta
- 2012 Philippe Tondre
- 2013 Ragnhild Hemsing
- 2014 Sophie Dartigalongue
- 2015 Nicolas Altstaedt
- 2016 Filippo Gorini
- 2017 Igor Levit
- 2018 Kit Armstrong
- 2019 Nicola Heinecker
- 2020 not awarded
- 2021 Knut Hanssen
- 2022 Julia Hagen
- 2023 Fabian Müller
- 2024 Michiaki Ueno
- 2025 Anouchka Hack
