= Kunert =

Kunert is a German surname. Notable people include:

- Andrzej Kunert (born 1952), Polish historian and lecturer
- Christian Kunert (born 1983), German bassoonist and conductor
- Gerhard Kunert (1920–1944), German Unteroffizier and Knight's Cross of the Iron Cross recipient
- Günter Kunert (1929–2019), German writer
- Hans Kunert, Knight's Cross of the Iron Cross recipient
- Heinz Kunert, (1927–2012), German engineer and inventor
- Joachim Kunert (1929–2020), German film director and screenwriter
- Marie Kunert (1871–1957), German politician
- Martin Kunert (born 1974), feature film and television writer, director and producer
- Rudolf Kunert, Knight's Cross of the Iron Cross recipient
- Timo Kunert (born 1987), German footballer

== See also ==
- Diether Kunerth (1940–2024), German painter and sculptor
