= Alfred Kim =

South Korean tenor

Alfred Kim (Korean: 김재형; RR: Gim Jaehyeong) is a Korean operatic tenor. With The Royal Opera, Kim sang the role of Calaf in Puccini's Turandot in 2014.

== Awards ==
In 1997, Kim won the International Belvedere Singing Competition in Vienna, and in 1998 he won the ARD International Music Competition in Munich.

== Arrest ==
In 2017, Kim was arrested for beating a young woman in his apartment in Paris. He was fined 8,000 euro and sentenced to eight months in prison.
