= Upatnieks =

Upatnieks is a surname. Notable people with the surname include:

- Gunars Upatnieks (born 1983), Latvian double-bass player
- Juris Upatnieks (1936–2026), Latvian-American physicist and inventor
- Rolands Upatnieks (1932–1994), Latvian luger
