= Alejandro Coello Calvo =

Spanish musician (born 1989)

- Born: Alejandro Coello Calvo; July 25, 1989 (age 37); León, Spain
- Occupations: Composer, Percussionist
- Years active: 2005–present

Alejandro Coello Calvo (born July 25, 1989) is a Spanish percussionist, composer and producer. At only 23 years old, he became percussion solo teacher (Lehrbeauftragter) at the University of Music Franz Liszt in Weimar, Weimar (Hochschule für Musik Franz Liszt, Weimar). From 2017 to 2018 he gave lessons at the Castilla y León Higher Conservatory of Music in Spain (Conservatorio Superior de Música de Castilla y León).

== Biography ==
Alejandro Coello was born in León, Spain, the only son of composer Emilio Coello and flautist María Luisa Calvo. His maternal grandfather, Mr. Luis Calvo Rey, was conductor of the Municipal Music Band of Astorga, allowing him to grow up in a musical environment.

At the age of five, Coello started attending his first music lessons at the "Alcobendas Municipal School of Music and Dance" (Escuela Municipal de Música y Danza de Alcobendas). Subsequently, he attended contrabass lessons at the "Salamanca Professional Conservatory of Music" (Conservatorio profesional de Música de Salamanca). Two years later, Coello changed these lessons to percussion with professor Alejandro Sancho Pérez. Simultaneously, he reached a “Professional Grade” (specializing in harpsichord) with professor Alfonso Sebastián Alegre.

When he was sixteen years old, Alejandro enrolled at the “Castilla y León Higher Conservatory of Music” (Conservatorio Superior de Música de Castilla y León), where he studied three of four years with professor Tomás Martín López. Concurrently, Coello began his chamber music lessons with professor Alberto Rosado Carabías. At that stage, he was awarded the "Excellent Academic Record Scholarship" for three consecutive years.

By the end of 2008, Alejandro moved to Weimar, Germany, with a scholarship granted by the Erasmus Programme (period from 2009-2010) in order to attend classes with the distinguished percussionist and professor Markus Leoson at the “University of Music Franz Liszt in Weimar” (Hochschule für Musik Franz Liszt Weimar). After this time, Coello returned to Salamanca, Spain, to take his final examinations, graduating with honors and reaching the “Most Outstanding Graduate Prize”. Later on, he was invited by professor Leoson to audition for the Konzertexamen (The highest achievable degree in German academies of music), ensuring his return and stay in Weimar for the next two years. During this period, Coello was twice granted the Charlotte-Krupp Stipendium.

From 2012-2013, Alejandro prepared himself for the “Teaching Audition/Recruitment”, where he won and became at only 23 years old, percussion solo teacher in the same institution which welcomed him warmly as an Erasmus exchange student.

== Percussionist ==
Coello has participated in a variety of music ensembles. His beginnings were with the “Salamanca Youth Orchestra” (Orquesta Joven de Salamanca), “Castilla y León Youth Symphony Orchestra” (Joven Orquesta Sinfónica de Castilla y León) and “Salamanca University Big Band” (Big Band de la Universidad de Salamanca). Subsequently, Alejandro collaborated with small ensembles such as the “Plural Ensemble”, “Smash Ensemble”, “Philharmonic Chamber Orchestra of Madrid” (Orquesta Sinfónica de Cámara de Madrid) and “Iberian Orchestra of Leon” (Orquesta Ibérica de León) in which he premiered as soloist the Concert for Guitar, Marimba and Orchestra by Flores Chaviano.

Consecutively, at 16 years old, Coello conducted the “Per Músicam Orchestra” in the old Cathedral of Madrid (Colegiata de San Isidro). Concurrently, together with his friend and saxophonist Xabier Casal Ares, he formed Perc`air duo in which they played in the International Music Festival of Santander.

Once in Weimar, Coello started several new projects both in Spain and in Germany. In 2009, Alejandro and his Bulgarian friend Tomi Ananiev Emilov, formed MixStick percussion duo. Later on, they travelled to Shanghai, China, where they won the “First and Golden prize” (chamber music category) in the International Festival and Percussion Competition 2011. Currently, they offer many concerts in Germany, Spain and Bulgaria. Presently, Coello is member of the Ensemble Iberoamericano conducted by Joan Pagès.

Alejandro has participated with the Youth Percussion Pool directed by Tatiana Koleva and in which Emmanuel Séjourné has premiered his Concert for Vibraphone and Marimba. In 2013, the “Youth Percussion Pool” was awarded “Ensemble of the year” in Bulgaria.

In 2014 he has performed a chamber music percussion concert in Hangzhou, China. In November 2015, he was invited as a guest professor by the Shanghai Percussion Association. In August 2016, Alejandro performed and acted as jury at the Music Festival in Taiyuan, China.

In October 2016, he performed at the Weimar Palace (Stadtschloss Weimar) along with his music group Art Government Percussions. In 2017 gave a concert for the WWF (World Wildlife Fund) and the Shenzhen Foundation.

Coello has taken courses with Nebojsa Jovan Zivkovic, Bogdan Bacanu, Miguel Bernat, Raul Benavent, Rafael Mas, Emmanuel Séjourné, Paco Díaz, Emilio Díaz, Julio Barreto, Rafael Savón, Carlos Llacer, Arturo Serra and Markus Leoson, and has been conducted by Lutz Köller, Zolt Nagy, Jean Paul Dessy, José Manuel López López, Fabian Panisello, Rubén Jimeno, Ignacio Vidal, Nicolas Pasquet, Christian Thielemann among others.

== Composer and arranger ==
Coello composes for different groups and styles ranging from electronic to instrumental music. He is principally focused on audiovisual media and film music. Some of his pieces are: Concertrate for marimba solo, Percversions for vibraphone and additional percussion, "Malpaíses" for guitar and marimba (which was written for and dedicated to his close friend and renowned guitarist Ricardo Gallén).

Moreover, Alejandro has arranged two versions of “Píntame angelitos negros” and “El cumbanchero” for mixed choir which were commissioned by the “Contemporary Vocal Ensemble of Tenerife” conducted by Antonio Abreu Lechado. These arrangements received positive reviews from the spectators. On January 11, 2014, Coello premiered two of his seven preludes performed by the pianist Tito García González at the National Auditorium of Spain in Madrid.

He worked on audiovisual music projects and short films for master students at the Bauhaus University, Weimar.

Amongst his most recent collaborations as composer is the TV spot “The conflict in Syria: a gigantic open wound” for the UNHCR (United Nations High Commissioner for Refugees) featuring Melanie Olivares, Anne Igartiburu and Luis Tosar. This spot was broadcast on national Spanish television via the Telecinco channel and Internet.

Coello currently works in cooperation with the director Arthur Keir.

== Recordings ==
Among his most recent recordings:

Percussion Theory ft. Simon Phillips, Diego Barber, Xabier Casal and Art Government Percussions (Release date: April 5, 2019 through Sunnyside Records, NY).

One minute later, with the jazz quartet formed by versatile guitarist Diego Barber, Eric Harland and Ben Williams, recorded in Avatar Studios, NYC (Sunnyside records).

Estampas Latinas, featuring renowned classical guitarist Ricardo Gallen and Ensemble Iberoamericano.

Winnipeg. "Música y exilio" by “Ensemble Iberoamericano” (Record Label Genuin).

Beatus PALAFOX. "Polifonía del Siglo XVII Entre Dos Mundos" performed by Camerata Lacunensis, Capilla Nivariense, y Cantoría San Miguel de las Victorias.

Recordings for the “MDR Figaro German radio” (Mitteldeutscher Rundfunk).

Nowadays, Alejandro works on his second CD ft. renowned percussionists from around the world.

== Personal life ==
Coello lives in Weimar, where he works as percussion teacher at the Hochschule Für Musik Franz Liszt and at the Musikgymnasium Schloss Belvedere. In addition, Alejandro holds intensive percussion courses, offers concerts with chamber music groups, performs as soloist, composes and writes music. He is married to Mexican singer Liliana Cortez Burciaga.
