= Maria Zaitseva (cellist) =

Russian classical cellist

- Born: 2001 (age 24–25); Moscow, Russia
- Education: Gnessin Moscow Special School of Music; Tchaikovsky Conservatory
- Occupation: Classical cellist
- Known for: ARD International Music Competition (2024); Queen Elisabeth Competition (2026)

Maria Zaitseva (born 2001) is a Russian classical cellist. She gained international recognition after winning the ARD International Music Competition in Munich in 2024.

== Early life and education ==
Zaitseva was born in Moscow in 2001. Her mother is a pianist, and she began studying the cello at the age of four. She studied with Oleg Bugaev at the Gnessin Moscow Special School of Music and was the recipient of a scholarship from the Mstislav Rostropovich Foundation. She later continued her studies at the Tchaikovsky Conservatory in Moscow, remaining a student of Oleg Bugaev.

== Career ==
=== Competition career ===
Before her successes in Munich and Brussels, Zaitseva was a prizewinner at several international competitions, including the Antonio Janigro International Cello Competition and the Svyatoslav Knushevitsky International Cello Competition. She also received recognition at the International Tchaikovsky Competition and was a semi-finalist at the Geneva International Music Competition.

=== ARD International Music Competition (2024) ===
In September 2024, Zaitseva won first prize in the violoncello division of the ARD International Music Competition in Munich. She also received the Audience Prize and the Munich Chamber Orchestra Special Prize.

The final round took place in the Herkulessaal of the Munich Residenz, where the finalists performed with the Bavarian Radio Symphony Orchestra conducted by Hankyeol Yoon.

Critics noted her musical storytelling, technical command, and tonal richness.

=== Queen Elisabeth Competition (2026) ===
In 2026, she won the sixth prize in the Queen Elisabeth Competition in Brussels, one of the world's leading international competitions for classical musicians. In her semi-final recital, she was accompanied on the piano by her mother, Maria Zaitseva Sr.

== Performances ==
Zaitseva has appeared in international competitions and concert performances throughout Europe.

== Reception ==
Following her ARD victory, critics described Zaitseva as a compelling musical storyteller with strong technical abilities and expressive playing.

Her performances have been praised for their combination of virtuosity and communicative musical interpretation.

== Awards ==
- ARD International Music Competition (2024)

– 1st Prize
– Audience Prize
– Munich Chamber Orchestra Special Prize

- Queen Elisabeth Competition – Sixth Prize (2026)
