= Carlos Duarte =

Carlos Duarte may refer to:

- Carlos Duarte Costa (1888–1961), Brazilian Catholic bishop
- Carlos Duarte (footballer) (1933–2022), Portuguese footballer who played as a winger
- Carlos Duarte (composer) (1957–2003), Venezuelan composer
- Carlos M. Duarte (born 1960), Spanish marine ecologist
