= Auryn Quartet =

German string quartet

- Origin: Germany
- Genres: Classical music, string quartet
- Years active: 1981–2021
- Past members: Andreas Arndt (cello); Stewart Eaton (viola), Matthias Lingenfelder (violin); Jens Oppermann (violin)

The Auryn Quartet was a German string quartet. Founded in 1981, the members were Andreas Arndt (cello), Stewart Eaton (viola), Matthias Lingenfelder (*1959) and Jens Oppermann (*1960), both violin.

After winning several early awards - including the London International Competition (1982), the ARD International Music Competition (1982), and the main prize at the European Broadcasting Competition in Bratislava (1989) - they had the opportunity to treat the classic repertoire in particular depth thanks to the ongoing interactions between the original personnel.

Their recordings include the complete 68 quartets of Haydn and 15 plus the Grosse Fuge by Beethoven.

The quartet disbanded at the end of the 2020–2021 season.
