= Matthias Rácz =

German bassoonist

Matthias Rácz (born 1980) is a German bassoonist.

== Career ==
Rácz was born in East Berlin and began his musical education at the age of 6, first on the piano and at 10 also on the bassoon. During his school days at the Carl-Philipp-Emanuel-Bach-Gymnasium in Berlin, he was taught by Fritz Finsch. During his studies he was a pupil of Dag Jensen at the Hochschule für Musik, Theater und Medien Hannover. He took part in competitions at an early age and won several first national prizes in solo and chamber music competitions at the Jugend musiziert. During his musical education, he was awarded various grants, including scholarships from the "Jürgen Ponto Stiftung", the "Villa Musica", the "PE-Förderkreis für Studierende der Musik" and the "Studienstiftung des deutschen Volkes".

At the age of 15 he made his debut as a soloist with the Cologne Chamber Orchestra in the television production "Junge Künstler auf dem Podium". Further concerts followed with the Interlochen-World-Youth-Symphony Orchestra (Michigan/USA), the Ensemble Resonanz, the Norddeutsche Philharmonie Rostock, the Orchestra della Svizzera Italiana, the Symphonieorchester des Bayerischen Rundfunks, the Deutsches Symphonie-Orchester Berlin, the Tonhalle Orchester Zürich, to name but a few. He has been guest soloist at many music festivals such as the Mozartfest Schwetzingen, the Rheingau Music Festival, the Schleswig-Holstein Music Festival and the Festspiele Mecklenburg-Vorpommern.

At the 2000 Internationaler Musikwettbewerb Pacem in Terris in Bayreuth, he was awarded 3rd prize in the overall ranking of all woodwind instruments. In 2002, he won 1st prize at the International Music Competition "Prague Spring" and in the same year he won 2nd prize in the bassoon category at the ARD International Music Competition in Munich.

== Artistic activity ==
At the age of 21, he became principal bassoonist in the Gürzenich Orchestra Cologne and since 2003 he has held the same position in the Tonhalle Orchester Zürich. He is also principal bassoonist in the Lucerne Festival Orchestra.

His CD productions, among others in 2013 with the Nordwestdeutsche Philharmonie conducted by Johannes Klumpp, his concert recordings of various radio stations as well as television and radio productions document his artistic work.

== Teaching activities ==
Notwithstanding his young age, Rácz was invited by Seiji Ozawa to teach at the Ongaku-juku Opera Project in Japan in 2003. At the age of 24, he gave his first international master class for bassoon and since then many master classes have taken him around the world. He is also artistic director of the international oboe and bassoon competition "The Muri Competition" in Muri AG/Switzerland.

Rácz holds a professorship for bassoon at the University of Arts Zürich (ZHdK - Zürcher Hochschule der Künste).

== Recordings ==
- Robert Schumann: 5 Stücke im Volkston (op. 102) für Violoncello und Klavier, Fantasiestücke für Klarinette und Klavier (op. 73), drei Romanzen für Oboe und Klavier (op. 94), Adagio und Allegro für Violoncello und Klavier (op. 70), Waldszenen für Klavier (op. 82)
- Pictures at an exhibition, Pieces by Alan Stephenson, Astor Piazzolla, Modest Mussorgsky and Oscar Petersen mit dem Quadriga Bassoon Ensemble, 2004
- Paul Juon, Quintett d-Moll (op. 33), Kammersinfonie (op. 27), coproduction with the Swiss Radio DRS 2
- Mozart, Hummel, Weber - Bassoon Concertos, Matthias Racz, Nordwestdeutsche Philharmonie conducted by Johannes Klumpp, Ars-Produktion 2013
