= Julia Hagen =

Austrian cellist (born 1995)

- Born: 1995 (age 30–31); Salzburg, Austria
- Education: Mozarteum; University of Music and Performing Arts Vienna; Berlin University of the Arts; Kronberg Academy
- Occupation: Classical cellist
- Awards: Beethoven Ring

Julia Hagen (born 1995) is an Austrian cellist who made an international career as both a soloist and a chamber musician. She has performed at festivals such as the Menuhin Festival Gstaad, the Salzburg Festival and the Rheingau Musik Festival. She plays a cello on loan made in 1684 by Francesco Ruggeri.

== Life and career ==
Hagen was born in Salzburg in 1995; her father is the cellist Clemens Hagen, the cellist of the Hagen Quartet, and her mother is also a musician. She was trained in cello at the Musikum Salzburg from age four. She studied at the Mozarteum from 2007 to 2011 with Enrico Bronzi, and studied further with Reinhard Latzko and Heinrich Schiff at the University of Music and Performing Arts Vienna until 2015, and with Jens Peter Maintz at the Berlin University of the Arts until 2019. She then studied with Wolfgang Emanuel Schmidt at the Kronberg Academy on a scholarship. She took master classes with Laurence Lesser and Claudio Bohórquez, among others, and participated in the Classe d'Excellence de Violoncelle of Gautier Capuçon from 2014 to 2016 as one of only six cellists admitted.

Hagen made her debut as a soloist at age 14 at the Brucknerhaus in Linz with the Wiener Jeunesse Orchester. She toured to European countries and Tokyo, playing at the Konzerthaus and the Musikverein in Vienna, the Barbican Centre and the Suntory Hall. She was a soloist with orchestras such as the Konzerthausorchester Berlin, Tonhalle Orchester Zürich, the Bruckner Orchestra Linz, the Mozarteum Orchestra, Kremerata Baltica, Wiener Kammerorchester, Kurpfälzisches Kammerorchester, the Sofia Philharmonic Orchestra, RAI National Symphony Orchestra, Orchestre Royal de Chambre de Wallonie, Orchestra Sinfonica Abruzzese and the Metropolitan Symphony Orchestra of Tokyo.

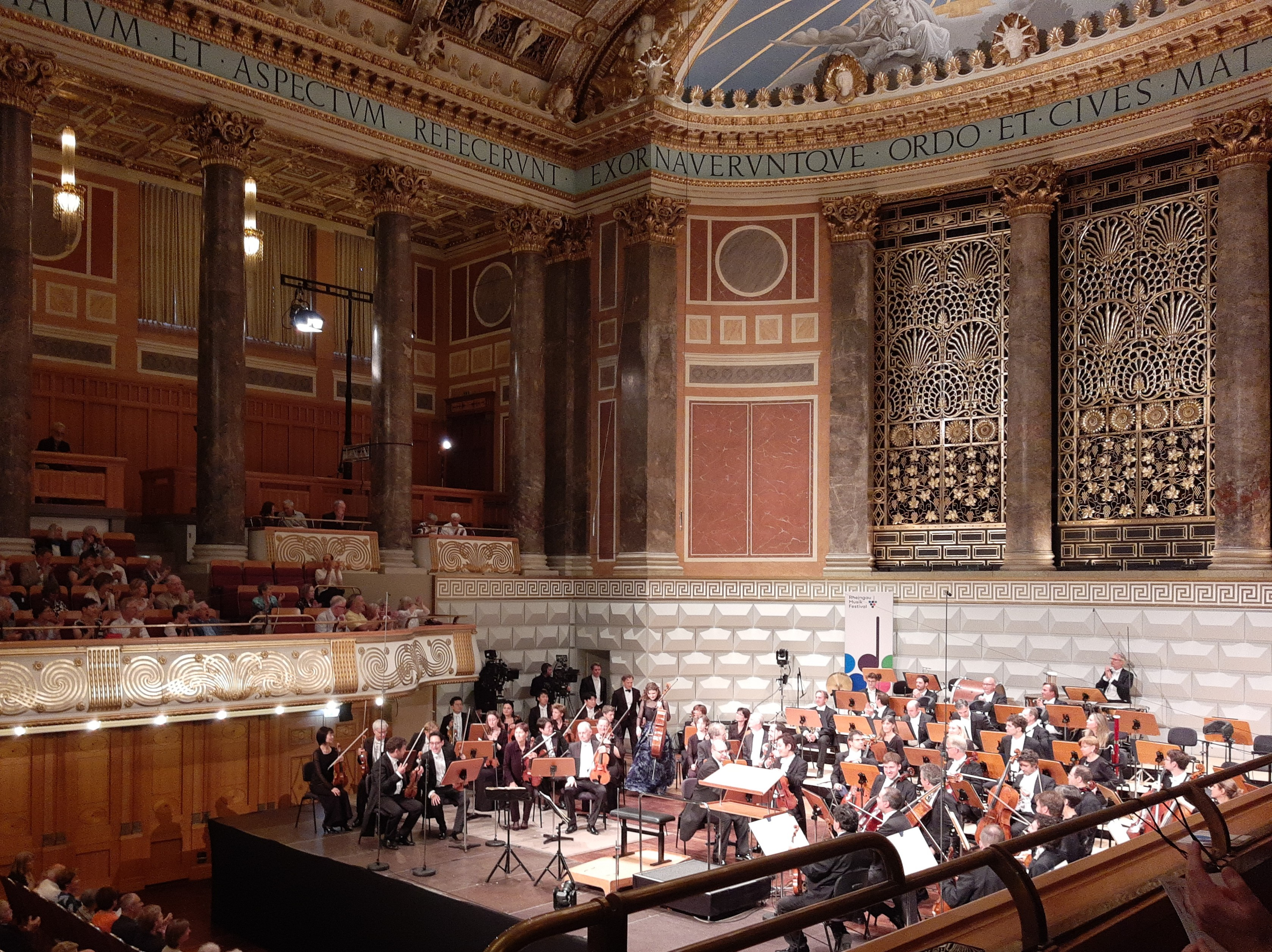
Hagen and Capuçon entering for the Brahms Double Concerto

At the Menuhin Festival Gstaad, she appeared in 2020 with pianist Aaron Pilsan in a livestreamed concert that included Mendelssohn's Cello Sonata No. 1, Debussy's Cello Sonata and César Franck's Sonata. She performed at the 2021 Salzburg Festival in Bruckner's Symphony No. 7 in an arrangement for chamber ensemble by Hanns Eisler, with violinist Renaud Capuçon and others. Other international festivals included the Beethovenfest in Bonn, Heidelberger Frühling, the Aix-en-Provence Festival, Musiktage Mondsee, Allegro Vivo, and Internationales Alfredo Piatti Festival. Her concert at the 2025 Rheingau Musik Festival, playing the Double Concerto by Brahms with Renaud Capuçon and the Bamberg Symphony conducted by Jakub Hrůša at the Kurhaus Wiesbaden, was recorded by Arte.

Hagen has played chamber music also with pianists Annika Treutler, Stefan Vladar, Khatia Buniatishvili, Marc-André Hamelin and Igor Levit and with clarinetist Daniel Ottensamer. She published her first CD with Treutler in 2019, playing works by Johannes Brahms.

Hagen plays a cello on loan, which was made by Francesco Ruggeri in 1684.

== Awards ==
- Laureate at several Prima la musica (solo and chamber music)
- 2010: First prize at Internationaler Cellowettbewerb in Liezen
- 2014: ESTA (European String Teachers Association) special prize at the International Johannes Brahms Competition
- 2016: First prize at International Cello Competition Mazzacurati in Turin
- 2017: Hajek-Boss-Kulturpreis
- Nicolas Firmenich Prize from the Verbier Festival Academy
- 2022: Beethoven Ring

== Recordings ==
- 2019: Brahms: Sonatas No. 1 & No. 2, Six Songs, Op. 86, with pianist Annika Treutler, Hänssler
