= Judith Burganger =

American pianist and pedagogue

Judith Burganger (born 1939) is an American pianist and pedagogue.

== Biography ==
=== Early years ===
Born in Buffalo, New York, United States, Judith Burganger began her musical studies at the age of four with Laura Kelsey (a pupil of Ernest Hutcheson at The Juilliard School) and her education and career were advised by Mme. Isabella Vengerova and Mieczyslaw Horszowski from the age of nine. She regularly played chamber music with members of the Buffalo Philharmonic well into her teenage years. By the end of high school, she had performed with the Toronto Symphony in Massey Hall, over 30 times with the Buffalo Philharmonic, and earned the first prize in the National Merriweather Post Competition in Washington, D.C. where she performed several times with the National Symphony in Constitution Hall. She furthered her pre-college studies at the Marlboro Chamber Music Festival, receiving coachings and lessons from such notable musicians as Rudolf Serkin, Felix Galimir, Alexander Schneider, Hermann Busch, and Marcel Moyse; after which, she pursued private lessons with Seymour Lipkin in New York City.

=== In Europe ===
Following Rudolf Serkin’s guidance, Burganger went abroad to study piano and chamber music with Professors Vladimir Horbowski, Hubert Giesen, Ricardo Odnoposoff, Alfred Lowenguth, and Kurt Stiehler at the Staatliche Hochschule für Musik und Darstellende Kunst in Stuttgart, Germany. The list of earned honors grew as she entered the Concours International d’execution Musicale in Geneva, Switzerland (Bronze Medal), National Competition of Western Germany’s Music Conservatories (First Prize), and in 1965, she became the first American, as well as the first pianist in six years, to win the First Prize in the ARD International Piano Competition in Munich, Germany (other notable prizewinners of the competition include Christoph Eschenbach, Ingrid Haebler, and Mitsuko Uchida).

== As an artist ==
The successes in the European competitions granted Burganger international acclaim through solo and concerto performances playing with such major orchestras as the Chicago Symphony Orchestra, Cleveland Orchestra, Pittsburgh Symphony, Minnesota Orchestra, Bayerischer Rundfunk Sinfonieorchester, Zurich Radio Symphony Orchestra, and Tokyo Philharmonic Orchestra, among many others. She has worked with various prominent conductors of the 20th century, including Kazuyoshi Akiyama, Sergiu Comissiona, James Conlon, Arthur Fiedler, Bernard Haitink, Josef Krips, Lorin Maazel, Mitch Miller, André Previn, William Steinberg, and Michael Tilson Thomas. As an active chamber musician, she has collaborated with the Emerson String Quartet, Cleveland Quartet, Cavani String Quartet, Miami String Quartet, Alexander String Quartet, Dorian Wind Quintet and toured with cellist, Tsuyoshi Tsutsumi and clarinetist Gervase dePeyer performing two-recital cycles of the complete Brahms sonatas for cello, clarinet, and the trio. Her performances at music festivals with members of the Berlin Philharmonic and Bayerischer Rundfunk Sinfonieorchester included, along with Mozart piano concerti, performances of the sonatas for cello and clarinet by Max Reger. She has toured widely throughout Europe, USA, Canada, Japan and the People's Republic of China.

She has also appeared on National Public Radio’s “Performance Today” and television programs on PBS presenting duets with pianist, Leonid Treer. A collection of her performances can be seen on YouTube spanning the solo, concerti, and chamber repertoire. She is a founder and performer of the FAU Chamber Soloists (since 1985) and the Brahms Festival Concerts (since 1984); both are an ongoing series and the latter was devoted to the interpretive research and performance of the complete Brahms chamber repertoire, and the programs now include works of Brahms’ contemporaries.

== As a teacher ==
As a teacher, Burganger has held positions as professor and resident artist at the Cleveland Institute of Music, Carnegie Mellon University, Texas Tech University (holding the Eva Browning Chair), and was a Professor and Artist in Residence at Florida Atlantic University (from 1983 to 2013), where she designed and developed the undergraduate and graduate programs for students majoring in piano performance, collaborative arts and pedagogy. Particular attention is devoted to refining the artistry of students through the thorough understanding of technique and body / finger mechanics, style and phrasing awareness, tone production and pedaling, and rigorous attention to score interpretation.

In addition to the thirty-plus years of teaching at Florida Atlantic University, she also trains teachers of private studios aiding the standard of music education in the region. As a result, many young students have either won or placed in regional and national level competitions (e.g. MTNA, FSMTA, International Chinese Piano Competition in Washington, D.C., et al.) and have continued their musical pursuits at the collegiate level.

In 2013, Burganger was awarded the title of Professor Emerita by Florida Atlantic University for her exemplary dedication as a pedagogue and performer.
