= Clara Dent =

Austrian oboist

Clara Dent-Bogányi is an Austrian oboist and teacher. She has been a soloist with the Berlin Radio Symphony Orchestra and a teacher at the Hochschule für Musik Nürnberg, in addition to winning international competitions.

== Biography ==
Clara Dent was born in Berlin to a family of musicians; her family moved soon after to Salzburg. She received her musical education at the Mozarteum University Salzburg with Arthur Jensen, and later earned a Master's degree at the University of Music and Performing Arts Munich studying with Günther Passin. She has won prizes in several international competitions, including the ARD Competition in Munich (1996, third prize) and the Geneva International Music Competition (1998, second prize).

Since 1999, Dent has been a soloist in the oboe group of the Berlin Radio Symphony Orchestra. In 2007 she was invited by Kent Nagano to join the Bavarian State Orchestra for a year. As a soloist she has also performed with orchestras such as the Bavarian Radio Symphony Orchestra, the Polish Chamber Philharmonic Orchestra, the Württemberg and Stuttgart Chamber Orchestras and others. She is one of the founding members of the wind octet Da Ponte Oktett, mainly composed of musicians from the Munich Symphony Orchestra.

From 2005 to 2008, Dent taught oboe at the Richard Strauss Conservatory in Munich, then continued her teaching activities at the Leopold Mozart Centre in Augsburg. In 2009 she became a professor at the Hochschule für Musik Nürnberg. She also gives master classes in various European and Asian countries and participates in juries of national and international competitions. Her husband is the Hungarian bassoonist Bence Bogányi.
