= Fabrice Millischer =

French musician (1985-)

Fabrice Millischer (born 15 January 1985 in Toulouse) is a French trombonist, sackbutist and cellist.

He is the recipient of the 1st Prize of the ARD International Music Competition Munich, of the Victoires de la musique classique in 2011 in the category Révélation soliste instrumental de l'année ("Instrumental Solo Revelation of the Year") and had the honor of receiving a "EchoKlassik Preis" in 2014 for his CD French Trombone Concertos

== Biography ==
Fabrice Millischer was awarded the 1st prizes of cello and trombone at the Toulouse conservatory.

He studied cello at the Conservatoire de Paris with Philippe Muller, Roland Pidoux and Xavier Phillips.

He studied the trombone in the Lyon conservatory with Michel Becquet and Alain Manfrin, and the sackbut with Daniel Lassalle. He played with Jordi Savall and the sackbutists. He performs in recitals at international festivals (Washington, Beijing, Munichq, Basel, Paris, Tokyo).

He taught at the Paul Dukas conservatory in Paris before teaching in 2009 at the Hochschule für Musik Saar then in 2013 at the Hochschule für Musik Freiburg.

Between 2009 and 2013, he was trombonist in the philharmonic orchestra of Radio Saarbrücken Kaiserslautern.
