= Philippe Tondre =

French oboist (born 1989)

- Born: 1989 (age 36–37); Mulhouse, France
- Genre: Classical
- Occupation: Musician
- Instrument: Oboe

Philippe Tondre (born in 1989) is a French-British classical oboist. He has served as principal oboist of the Chamber Orchestra of Europe since 2019, the Philadelphia Orchestra since 2020, and a professor of oboe at the Curtis Institute of Music since 2022.

== Early days ==
Born in Mulhouse, Philippe Tondre started studying the oboe at the age of six in Yves Cautrès's class at the Mulhouse National School of Music before joining the Conservatoire de Paris in David Walter's class where he won his Prize of oboe as well as his master's degree in music interpretation. He also followed lessons by teachers such as Heinz Holliger, Maurice Bourgue, Jacques Tys, Jean-Louis Capezzali and Ingo Goritzki.

== Career ==
Very attached to orchestral activity, during his studies he integrated the Orchestre français des jeunes and the Gustav Mahler Jugendorchester under the direction of Sir Colin Davis and Herbert Blomstedt. At the age of eighteen, he was appointed solo oboe of the Stuttgart Radio Symphony Orchestra (Südwestrundfunk) under the direction of Sir Roger Norrington and Georges Prêtre, a position he held from 2008 to 2016. At the age of 19, he was spotted by Seiji Ozawa in Japan and became in 2010 a member of the Saito Kinen Orchestra of Matsumoto and then, in 2012, the Mito Chamber Orchestra under his direction. Since then, he has undertaken international tours with these two bands. As a guest solo oboe, Philippe Tondre has performed regularly with the Royal Concertgebouw Orchestra Amsterdam, Orchestre philharmonique de Radio France, and the Berlin Radio Symphony Orchestra.

Tondre is the winner of all major international competitions dedicated to oboe: Third Prize and Gustav Mahler Prize at the Prague International Spring Music Competition, First Prize at the Gillet-Fox competition of the International Double Reed Society in the United States, Second Prize at the International Competition of Japan organized by the Sony Music Foundation and Third Prize at the Geneva International Music Competition. In September 2011, he won the 60th ARD International Music Competition in Munich as well as three special prizes, including the Public Prize and the Prize for the best interpretation of Liza Lim's work composed for the competition, "Gyfu". The following year, in September 2012, following his concert at the Bonn International Festival, he was awarded the Beethoven Ring, making him the first oboist to receive this prestigious award, which had previously been awarded to great musicians such as Gustavo Dudamel, Julia Fischer and Lisa Batiashvili.

He had the opportunity to perform as a soloist with the Osaka Philharmonic Orchestra, the Hiroshima Symphony Orchestra, the Orchestre de chambre de Genève, the New Mozart Orchestra London, the Collegium Musicum Basel, the Stuttgarter Kammerorchester, the Stuttgart Radio Symphony Orchestra, the Orchestre de la Suisse Romande, the Kansai Philharmonic Orchestra, the Philharmonic Orchestra of Thailand, the Budapest Festival Orchestra, the Munich Chamber Orchestra, the "Ensemble La Folia", the Bavarian Radio Symphony Orchestra, the Kammerakademie Potsdam, the MDR Sinfonieorchester Leipzig, the Saito Kinen Festival Orchestra, the Philadelphia Orchestra and participates in many festivals in Asia, Europe and the United States.

In 2013, Tondre played the German premiere of James MacMillan's Oboe concerto under the direction of the composer in Stuttgart with his orchestra. In June of the same year, he played his "Debüt Konzert" at the Berlin Philharmonic with the Deutsche Sinfonie Orchester Berlin. He shared with Jacques Zoon the Japanese premiere of György Ligeti's Double Concerto with Seiji Ozawa's orchestra in Matsumoto in 2013 and participated in the ARTE program "Stars de Demain" presented by Rolando Villazón in Berlin. He also leads numerous masterclasses in the United States, Canada, Germany, Great Britain, Italy, Belgium, France, Switzerland, Taiwan, China and Japan.

In 2015 he joins the Budapest Festival Orchestra as principal oboe under the baton of Ivan Fischer and one year later becomes the solo oboe at the Leipzig Gewandhaus with Andris Nelsons, position he will hold one season before deciding to return to Stuttgart, rejoining the new named "SWR Symphony Orchestra" currently led by Teodor Currentzis. Philippe Tondre was a teacher at the Hochschule für Musik Saar from 2015 until 2023, becoming one of the youngest woodwind professor on German territory. Since March 2019, he has been the principal Oboe of the Chamber Orchestra of Europe, succeeding Douglas Boyd, Francois Leleux and Kai Frömbgen. He also holds the international chair at the Royal Northern College of Music in Manchester, England

He is appointed, at the end of the recruitment process which ended on Sunday, October 13, 2019, principal oboe of the Philadelphia Orchestra which he will join for summer festivals and then September 14, 2020, for the 2020–2021 season, following the retirement of Richard Woodhams. He thus perpetuates, following Marcel Tabuteau who held this same post from 1915 to 1954, the tradition of the presence of the French school of oboe in Philadelphia. Philippe Tondre was appointed a professor of Oboe at the Curtis Institute of Music in April 2022, beginning with the 2022–2023 school year, succeeding Woodhams there as well.

Since 2020, Tondre has been involved in the development of the new oboe models « Légende » and « Légende Hybride » from the famous french wind instrument maker Buffet Crampon. Following the success of the oboe, he was appointed head of research and development for the brand's oboe department during the summer of 2022. June of the same year marked his debut at Carnegie Hall, New York where he performed two concertos from Johann Sebastian Bach with the Orchestra of St Luke's.

Tondre's first solo album, Contrasts, featuring exclusively music from Robert Schumann, has already been awarded by the French magazine Diapason as well as the magazine Classica with two prizes. His next album, French Fragrances, will be launched in the fall of 2024.

== Awards ==
- Prague Spring International Music Competition 2008 : Third Prize, Gustav Mahler Prize
- International Double Reed Society Gillet-Fox Competition USA, Birmingham 2009 : First Prize
- International Oboe Competition of Japan sponsored by Sony, Tokyo 2009 : Second Prize
- Geneva International Music Competition 2010 : Third Prize
- ARD International Music Competition Munich 2011 : Second Prize (no First Prize prize awarded), Audience Prize, Prize for the best interpretation of Liza Lim's work composed for the competition, "Gyfu", IFP Prize
- Beethoven Ring 2012
- Diapason d’Or Découverte for the Album Contrasts 2024
- Choc de Classica for the Album Contrasts 2024
