= Yubeen Kim =

South Korean flutist (born 1997)

Background information
- Born: July 3, 1997 (age 29); Daejeon, South Korea
- Genres: Classical
- Occupations: Musician, soloist, professor
- Instrument: Flute
- Member of: San Francisco Symphony
- Formerly of: Konzerthausorchester Berlin
- Website: yubeenkimflute.com

Yubeen Kim (Korean: 김유빈) is a South Korean flutist.

== Early life and education ==
Kim began learning piano and violin at age 6 before switching to the flute at age 9. He studied at the Conservatoire de Paris and the Hochschule für Musik Hanns Eisler Berlin.

== Career ==
Kim has performed as a soloist with the Bavarian Radio Symphony Orchestra, Bochumer Symphoniker, Turku Philharmonic Orchestra, and Zagreb Philharmonic Orchestra.

In 2016, he joined Konzerthausorchester Berlin and became the orchestra's youngest-ever principal flutist, before leaving in 2023. In January 2024, Kim was appointed as principal flutist of the San Francisco Symphony. He is also a flute professor at the San Francisco Conservatory of Music.

== Awards and recognition ==
Kim won first prize at the ARD International Music Competition and the Prague Spring International Music Competition, and second prize at the Concours de Genève when no first prize was awarded.
