= Luisa Islam-Ali-Zade =

Uzbek Soviet opera singer

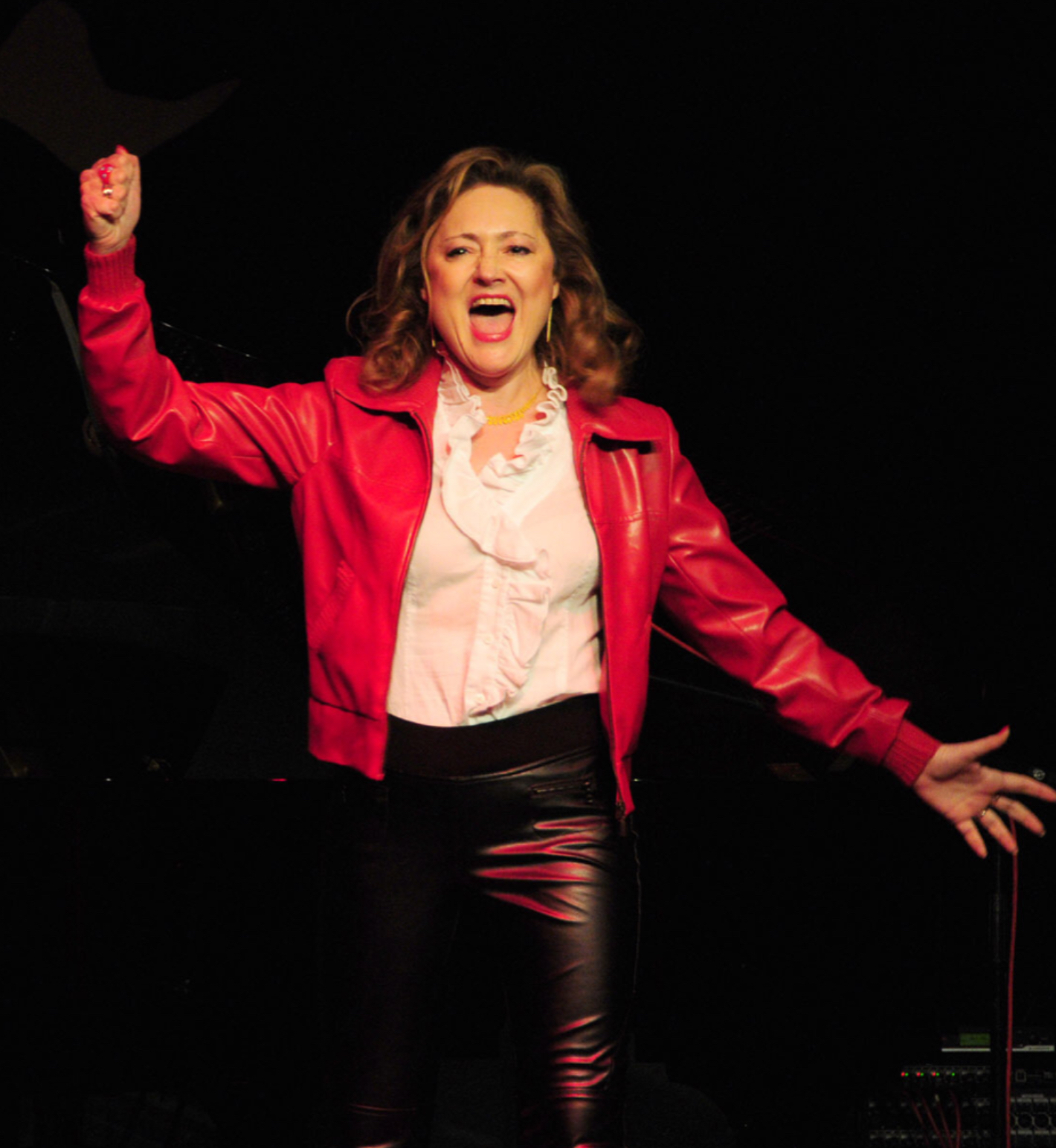
- Luisa Islam-Ali-Zade at the Revolution concert
- Born: 10 February 1971; Tashkent, Uzbek SSR, USSR
- Known for: opera singer
- Awards: "Golden Soffit" for "Best Female Role in Musical Theater"; third place at the ARD International Music Competition; second prize at the Belvedere International Vocal Competition named after Hans Gabor

Luiza Islam Ali-Zade (Uzbek: Luiza Islom Ali-Zade born February 10, 1971, Tashkent, Uzbekistan) is an Uzbek opera singer with a mezzo-soprano range. In 2008, she received the "Golden Soffit" award for "Best Female Role in Musical Theater".

== Biography ==
Luiza was born on February 10, 1971, in Tashkent. She began her singing education at the Hamza Hakimzade Niyazi Republican State College of Music in Tashkent, which was formerly known as the Hamza Music School. She later attended the N. A. Rimsky-Korsakov Saint Petersburg State Conservatory. She furthered her education at the Stuttgart University of Music and Performing Arts. Her professors included Konstantin Plyushnikov, Silvia Geshti, Konrad Richter, Tom Krause, Giulietta Simionato, Lamara Chkonia, and Fedora Barbieri. Louise started her opera career at the "Zazerkalye" theater in Saint Petersburg, where she also honed her acting skills under the guidance of director Alexander Petrov and conductor Pavel Bubelnikov.

Louise has performed in numerous European opera theaters, including the Vienna State Opera, the Hamburg State Opera, the Royal Danish Opera, and the German Opera. She has also appeared at the Grand Théâtre de Genève, Théâtre du Capitole de Toulouse, Royal Opera of Wallonia, and various other opera houses portraying various roles. She has participated in various festivals.

In 1999, Louise premiered a work by the French composer Philippe Hersant titled "Landscape with a Ruin" with the Lyon National Orchestra conducted by Tortelier, a piece dedicated to her by the composer. Following this, she made radio recordings in many European countries.

In 2011, she performed in a concert at the opening of the new opera house in Batumi. Louise also wrote the libretto and directed the opera "The Heart of a Boy from Permon" with music composed by Vladimir Genin, which was later adapted into a film.

== Awards ==
- "Golden Soffit" for "Best Female Role in Musical Theater" (2008)
- Third place at the International Music Competition ARD
- Second prize at the International Hans Gabor Belvedere Singing Competition(1993)
