= Sergey Khachatryan =

Armenian classical violinist

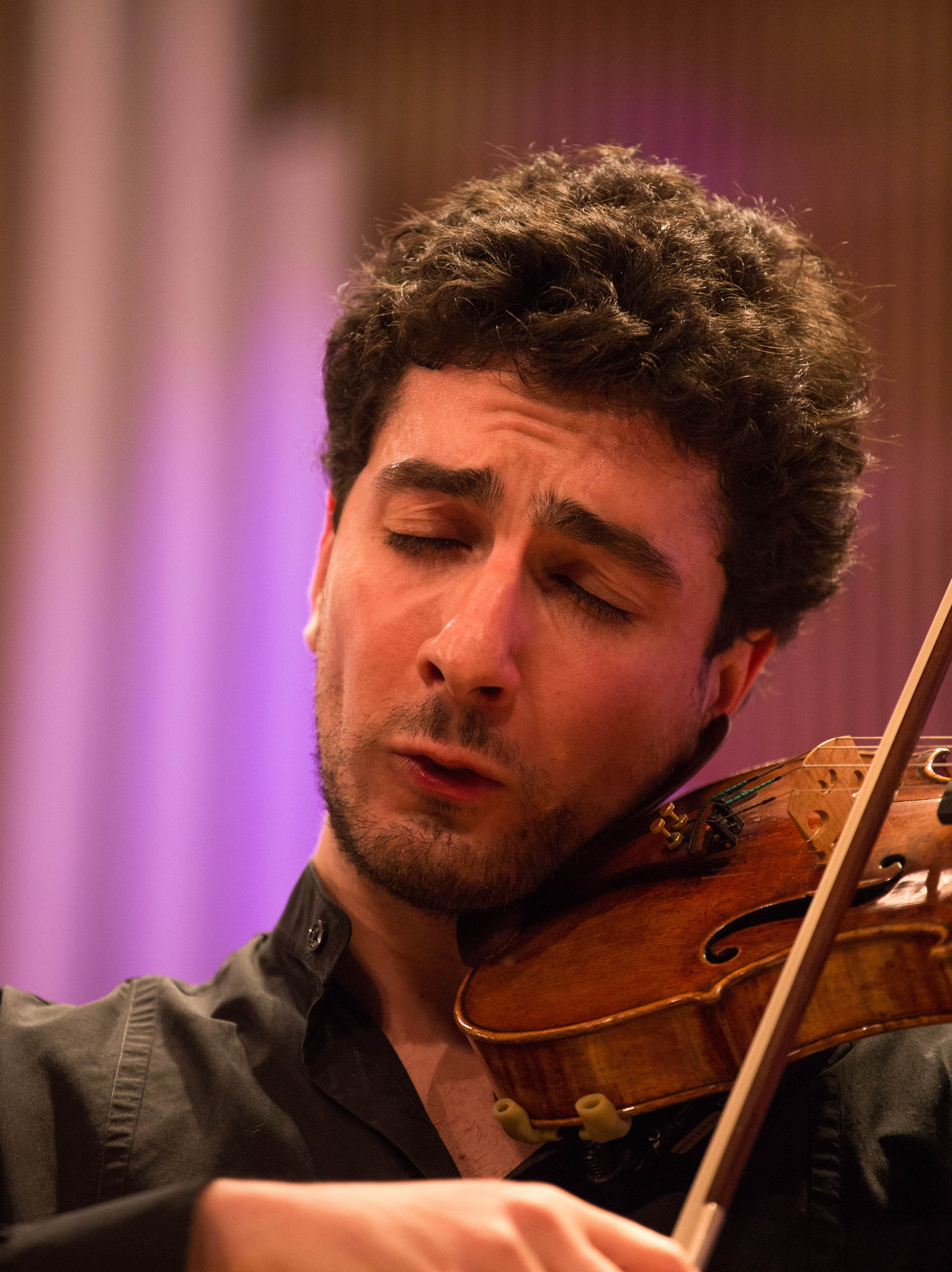

Background information
- Born: 5 April 1985 (age 41); Yerevan, Armenian SSR, Soviet Union
- Genres: Western classical
- Occupation: Concert violinist
- Years active: 1991–present
- Labels: EMI Classics, Naïve Records
- Website: sergeykhachatryan.com

Sergey Khachatryan (also spelled Sergei Khachatryan; Armenian: Սերգեյ Խաչատրյան; born 5 April 1985) is an Armenian classical violinist. He was born in Yerevan and since 1993 has lived in Germany, where he gave his first orchestral concert at the age of nine in the Kurhaus, Wiesbaden.

Khachatryan won First Prize at the International Jean Sibelius Violin Competition in Helsinki in 2000, becoming the youngest winner in the history of the competition, and in 2005 won First Prize at the Queen Elisabeth Competition in Brussels.

== Career ==
He made his New York City debut on 4 August 2006, playing the Beethoven Violin Concerto in Avery Fisher Hall under the baton of Osmo Vänskä. In June 2013, he played Shostakovich's First Violin Concerto with the Seattle Symphony and Ludovic Morlot.

Khachatryan has appeared with orchestras including the Armenian State Symphony Orchestra, Berliner Philharmoniker, Royal Concertgebouw Orchestra, London Symphony Orchestra, London Philharmonic Orchestra, Philharmonia Orchestra, Orchestre de Paris, Orchestre National de France, Rotterdam Philharmonic Orchestra, Bamberg Symphony, Munich Philharmonic, Mariinsky Orchestra, NHK Symphony Orchestra, Sydney Symphony Orchestra, Melbourne Symphony Orchestra, Seattle Symphony, Cleveland Orchestra, National Symphony Orchestra, New York Philharmonic, Boston Symphony Orchestra, Philadelphia Orchestra, San Francisco Symphony, Orchestra Sinfonica Nazionale della RAI, Montreal Symphony Orchestra, Toronto Symphony Orchestra, Bilbao Symphony Orchestra, Armenian National Philharmonic Orchestra and Sofia Philharmonic Orchestra.

In recent seasons, Khachatryan has performed with the Netherlands Radio Philharmonic Orchestra under Cristian Măcelaru, the Orchestra Sinfonica Nazionale della RAI under Kazuki Yamada, the Estonian National Symphony Orchestra under Olari Elts, the Orchestre National de France under Santtu-Matias Rouvali, the Bamberg Symphony under Ludovic Morlot, the Rotterdam Philharmonic under Valery Gergiev, and at the Teatro alla Scala in Milan under Myung-whun Chung. In the 2024–25 season, his engagements included performances with the Orchestra Sinfonica Nazionale della RAI, the Lyon National Orchestra, the Accademia Nazionale di Santa Cecilia, the Montreal Symphony Orchestra, the Frankfurter Museumsorchester, the Orquesta de Valencia, the Toronto Symphony Orchestra, the Gävle Symphony Orchestra and a Spanish tour with the Bilbao Symphony Orchestra.

In May 2023, Khachatryan appeared at Bulgaria Hall with the Sofia Philharmonic Orchestra in a programme that included Igor Stravinsky's Violin Concerto and Gustav Mahler's Symphony No. 4.

Khachatryan is also active as a recitalist and chamber musician. He regularly appears in duo with his sister, pianist Lusine Khachatryan. Their recital appearances have included the Wigmore Hall in London, the Théâtre des Champs-Élysées and Cité de la Musique in Paris, the Concertgebouw in Amsterdam, the Palais des Beaux-Arts, Brussels, Victoria Hall in Geneva, Brucknerhaus Linz, Konzerthaus Dortmund, Auditorio Nacional in Madrid, Philharmonie Luxembourg, Carnegie Hall and Alice Tully Hall in New York, and Herbst Theatre in San Francisco. He has also toured with Alisa Weilerstein and Inon Barnatan in a programme titled Transfigured Nights, featuring music by Beethoven, Schoenberg and Shostakovich.

== Prizes ==
- 2000: 1st prize at the International Louis Spohr Competition for Young Violinists
- 2000: 1st prize at the International Jean Sibelius Violin Competition; at the time, he was the youngest person to win the competition
- 2000: 2nd prize at the International Fritz Kreisler Competition
- 2002: 2nd prize at the Indianapolis International Violin Competition
- 2005: 1st prize at the Queen Elisabeth Music Competition
- 2008: The Medal of Movses Khorenatsi, Armenia
- 2010: Beethoven Ring Bonn
- 2012: Merited Artist of Armenia
- 2014: Credit Suisse Young Artist Award

At the Queen Elisabeth Competition, he won the 1708 "Huggins" Stradivarius violin on loan to him from the Nippon Music Foundation for four years. He played the 1740 Guarneri del Gesù "Ysaÿe" violin from October 2010 to May 2022 on loan from the Nippon Music Foundation.

== Recordings ==
Khachatryan's debut CD for EMI Classics was released on 7 October 2002. The album included the Brahms Violin Sonata No. 3 in D minor and Ravel's Tzigane, both performed with pianist Lusine Khachatryan, as well as Chausson's Poème and Waxman's Carmen Fantasy, performed with pianist Vladimir Khachatryan.

He has recorded several albums for Naïve Records, including:

- Sibelius – Violin Concerto / Khachaturian – Violin Concerto, with Sinfonia Varsovia and Emmanuel Krivine
- Shostakovich – Violin Concerto No. 1, Op. 77, and Violin Concerto No. 2, Op. 129, with the Orchestre National de France and Kurt Masur
- Franck – Violin Sonata in A major / Shostakovich – Violin Sonata, Op. 134
- J. S. Bach: Sonatas and Partitas for Solo Violin, BWV 1001–1006 (2010)
- Johannes Brahms – Violin Sonatas Nos. 1–3, with Lusine Khachatryan, piano (2012)
- My Armenia, with Lusine Khachatryan, including music by Komitas, Edvard Mirzoyan, Aram Khachaturian, Arno Babajanian and Edvard Baghdasaryan (2016)

The album My Armenia, released by Naïve Records with Lusine Khachatryan, received the Echo Klassik award for Chamber Music Recording of the Year in the 20th/21st century category.

In March 2024, Naïve Records released Khachatryan's recording of Eugène Ysaÿe's Six Sonatas for Solo Violin, Op. 27, performed on the 1740 Guarneri del Gesù "Ysaÿe" violin. The recording received the Preis der deutschen Schallplattenkritik in the chamber music category.
