= Benjamin Kim =

American pianist

- Born: Portland, Oregon, United States
- Other name: Ben Kim
- Occupation: Pianist
- Website: benkimonline.com

Benjamin "Ben" Kim is an American pianist, who won the 55th ARD International Music Competition in Munich, September 2006 (First prize).

== Biography ==
"Kim, who was born in Portland, Oregon, and raised in Fort Wayne, Indiana, began studying piano at the age of five with Dorothy Fahlman." At the age of eight, he performed his first public solo recital and his orchestral debut at twelve. At age 20, he finished an accelerated Bachelor of Music degree program at the Peabody Conservatory as a student of Leon Fleisher. He continued his studies at Peabody with Leon Fleisher together with Yong Hi Moon as a candidate for the Artist Diploma program. In addition, Ben was selected to attend the International Piano Academy Lake Como in Italy, a program for seven pianists, headed by Martha Argerich and William Grant Naboré. He finished his studies at the Universität der Künste Berlin (UDK Berlin) with Klaus Hellwig

He made his debut at Carnegie Hall's Zankel Hall with the Olympus Chamber Players in 2009 and at Suntory Hall in Tokyo in 2010. Kim has been presented in major halls throughout the world, including the Concertgebouw in Amsterdam, Musikverein in Vienna, Gewandhaus in Leipzig, Suntory Hall in Tokyo, and the Kennedy Center in Washington DC with orchestras such as the Bavarian Radio, German Radio, Baltimore, Seoul Philharmonic, and St Petersburg Hermitage State Symphonies. His performances have been broadcast on radio and television on all continents, including National Public Radio's classical music show From the Top and NPO4 in Holland.

== Awards ==
In September 2006, Kim won First Prize in the 55th ARD International Music Competition in Munich.

In 2012, Kim was one of six recipients selected among a pool of more than 13,000 graduates at the Johns Hopkins University to be awarded an Outstanding Recent Graduate Award for outstanding achievement or service in any professional field.

Kim was the recipient of the Rheingau Music Festival's 2017 LOTTO Career Development Prize. The international jury panel made its decision upon the following stated reasons: "His brilliant technique and his incredible flair for interpretive refinement are self-evident....an exceptional phenomenon among pianists his generation - such a natural, sympathetic charisma and pleasant modesty, coupled with great virtuosity, are rarely experienced with a leading musician.”

== Comments on Kim ==
- “In a music business not exactly lacking in pianists, Ben Kim belongs to that small group whose playing extends beyond brilliant keyboard magic and pleasing, beautiful sound. More so, Kim is a narrator who knows how to captivate his audience from first to last note," noted the Berliner Morgenpost.
- Legendary teacher and mentor Leon Fleisher exalted Kim for his "enormous potential for a first-class career."
- His performance of Brahms's Piano Concerto No. 1 in D minor in Baltimore, The Baltimore Sun reported, "Sparks were flying from the keyboard" with "power, precision, and feeling for the daunting score."

== Recordings ==
Works for solo piano by Chopin, Mozart and Debussy

- Chopin Sonata No.2 in B-flat minor, Op.35 "Funeral march"
- Mozart Sonata in E-flat Major, K. 282 (189g)
- Mozart Sonata No. 2 in F Major, K. 280 (189e)
- Debussy Suite Bergamasque

Sony USA, Sony BMG Korea, Sony Music Japan International Inc.(Sony CLASSICAL)

Chopin Préludes and Impromptus

Decca, Universal Music Group

Kim's recording was given an Editor's recommendation in November 2012 from the Japanese Record Geijutsu Magazine, stating, "without nervousness or over-excitement, without boasting technique or exaggeration, Kim plays Chopin's music as if he were breathing it."

Mozart Piano Concertos Nos. 17 and 23

- Piano Concerto No. 17 in G Major, K. 453
- Piano Concerto No. 23 in A Major, K. 488

Recorded with Concertgebouw Chamber Orchestra

Challenge Records
