= Gunars Upatnieks =

Latvian musician

Gunars Upatnieks (born 8 October 1983, in Jelgava) is a Latvian double-bass player and member of the Berlin Philharmonic.

He is prize winner at numerous competitions, including the ARD International Music Competition, the International ISB Solo Competition and the International Johannes Matthias Sperger Competition for Double Bass.

== Career ==
Upatnieks studied the bass at Jāzeps Vītols Latvian Academy of Music and Janáček Academy of Music and Performing Arts, where he was a student of Miloslav Jelinek. From 2005 to 2009, Gunars was the principal bass at the Latvian National Symphony Orchestra. During the season of 2010/2011, he was holding the position of the assistant principal bass at the Bergen Philharmonic Orchestra. Since 2011, Gunars is a member of the Berlin Philharmonic. Since 2015 Upatnieks teaches at the Hanns Eisler School of Music Berlin.

As well as the solo-repertoire of the classic and romantic period such as the double bass concertos of Bottesini, Dittersdorf and Koussevitzky, Upatnieks' interest also lies in works by contemporary composers Pēteris Vasks, Rolf Martinsson and others. Upatnieks regularly performs as a soloist and a chamber musician, as well as teaches workshops. Lately he participated in the opening of the new Elbphilharmonie in Hamburg, together with Latvian National Symphony Orchestra and Ulster Orchestra played Eduard Tubin's concerto for bass and orchestra, and taught master classes at the Royal College of Music in London and the Amsterdam Conservatory. He is founder and artistic director of Sensus Music Festival.
