= Jean Deplace =

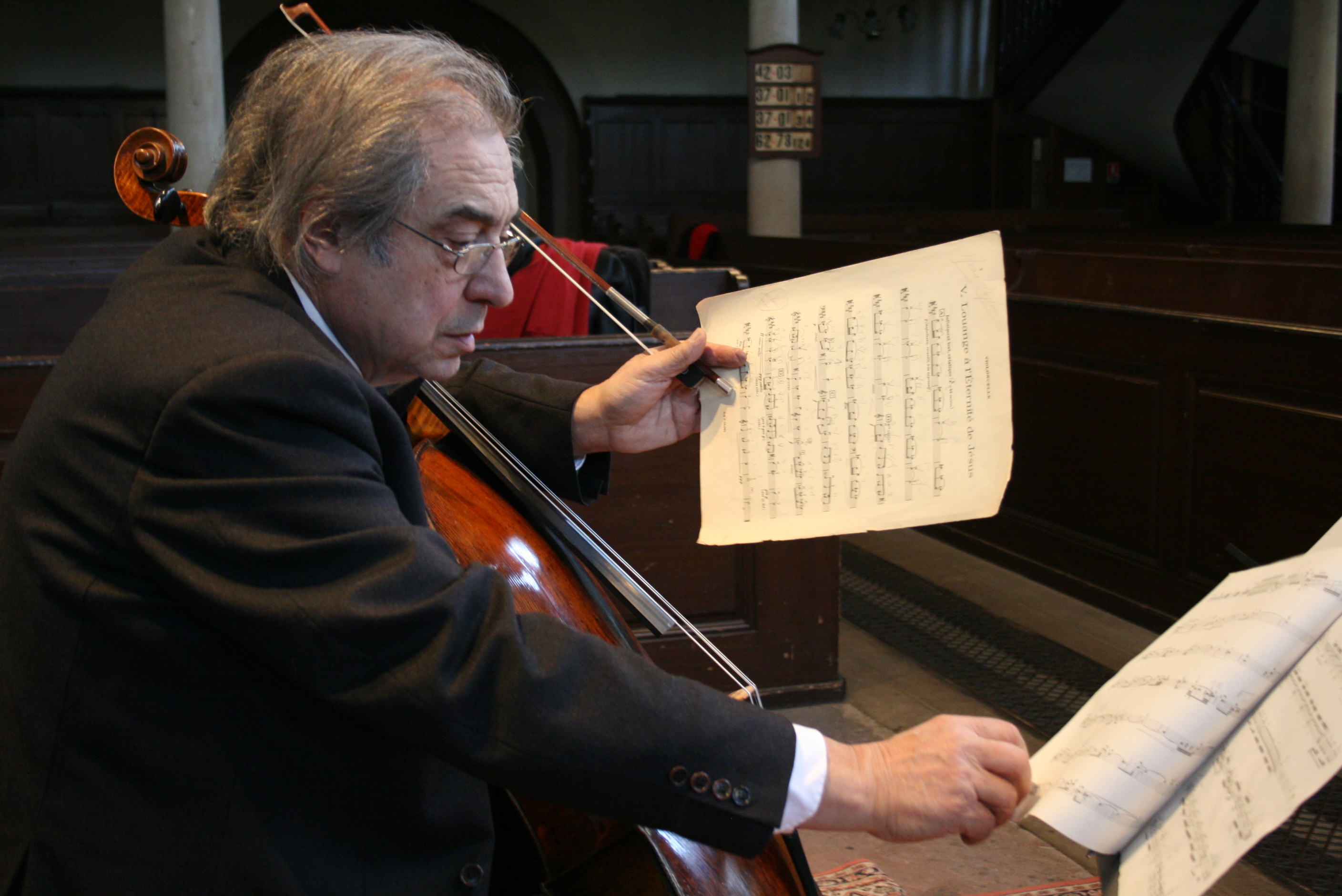

Background information
- Born: July 12, 1944; Saint-Chamond, France
- Died: November 30, 2015 (aged 71); Strasbourg, France
- Instrument: Cello

Jean Lucien Deplace (12 July 1944 – 30 November 2015) was a French cellist. Many well-known cellists studied with Deplace. Deplace studied with Maurice Maréchal and won first prize for cello in 1963 at the Paris Conservatory. Deplace went on to win awards in international competitions including; the Grand Prize of the Geneva International Music Competition, the Budapest Grand Prize and the Florence Grand Prize. Deplace was also the recipient of a Sasha Schneider Foundation award. Deplace performed with leading orchestras including Orchestre Philharmonique de Radio France, Orchestre de Monte Carlo, the Bavarian Radio Symphony Orchestra and at the Orchestra del Maggio Musicale Fiorentino.

In 1971 he formed a duo with the pianist Andrée Plaine that gained recognition in Europe, North America and Japan. Deplace was appointed principal cello ("super-soloist") of the Orchestre philharmonique de Strasbourg. In 1981 he was appointed professor of cello at the Conservatoire national supérieur musique et danse de Lyon.

Deplace died on 30 November 2015 at the age of 71.
