= Přemysl Vojta =

Czech hornist (born 1983)

Přemysl Vojta (born 1983) is a Czech horn player.

== Life ==
Born in Brno, Vojta received horn lessons from the age of 10 and studied at the Prague Conservatory with Bedřich Tylšar from 1998 to 2004 and then at the Berlin University of the Arts with Christian-Friedrich Dallmann from 2004 to 2010. He was then principal horn with the Konzerthausorchester Berlin and since 2015 with the WDR Sinfonieorchester Köln.

Since his success at the ARD International Music Competition in 2010, he has also performed as a concert soloist and chamber musician. His repertoire includes works with piano accompaniment and horn concertos by Joseph and Michael Haydn, Wolfgang Amadeus Mozart, Richard Strauss and composers of the modern era.

== Prize ==
- 1st prize, audience award and prize for the best interpretation of the commissioned composition at the ARD International Music Competition (2010)

== Recordings ==
- Johannes Brahms: Piano trios (including clarinet trio and horn trio) with the Smetana Trio. CD published by Supraphon, 2012
- French Horn in Prague (works by Kofron, Sestak, Slavicky, Hlobil) with Tomoko Sawano, piano. CD published by Supraphon, 2012
- Metamorphosis (works by Beethoven, Schumann, Giselher Klebe) with Tobias Koch, piano. CD published by CAvi, 2017
- Michael & Joseph Haydn, Horn Concertos, Haydn Ensemble Prague, Michael Petrák conducting. CD released by CAvi, 2018
