= Bernède Quartet =

The Bernède quartet was a French string quartet established in 1963 in Paris and disestablished in 1991.

== Members ==
=== First violin ===
- Jean-Claude Bernède (1935–1991)

=== Second violin ===
- Jacques Prat (1963–1967)
- Gérard Montmayeur (1967–1970)
- Marcel Charpentier (1970–)

=== Viola ===
- Bruno Pasquier (1963–1967)
- Guy Chêne (1967–1970)
- Michel Laléouse (1970–)
- Serge Collot (1923–2015)

=== Cello ===
- Paul Boufil (1963-1976)
- Jean-Claude Ribéra (1976-1979)
- Pierre Penassou (1925–2000)

== Premieres ==
- Quartet nº 3 by Claude Ballif
- Entre la fumée et le cristal, for vibraphone and string quartet, Op.13 by François Leclère in 1989
- Quatuor nº 2 by Michel Philippot
- Works by Xenakis
