= Ivan Podyomov =

Russian oboist (born 1986)

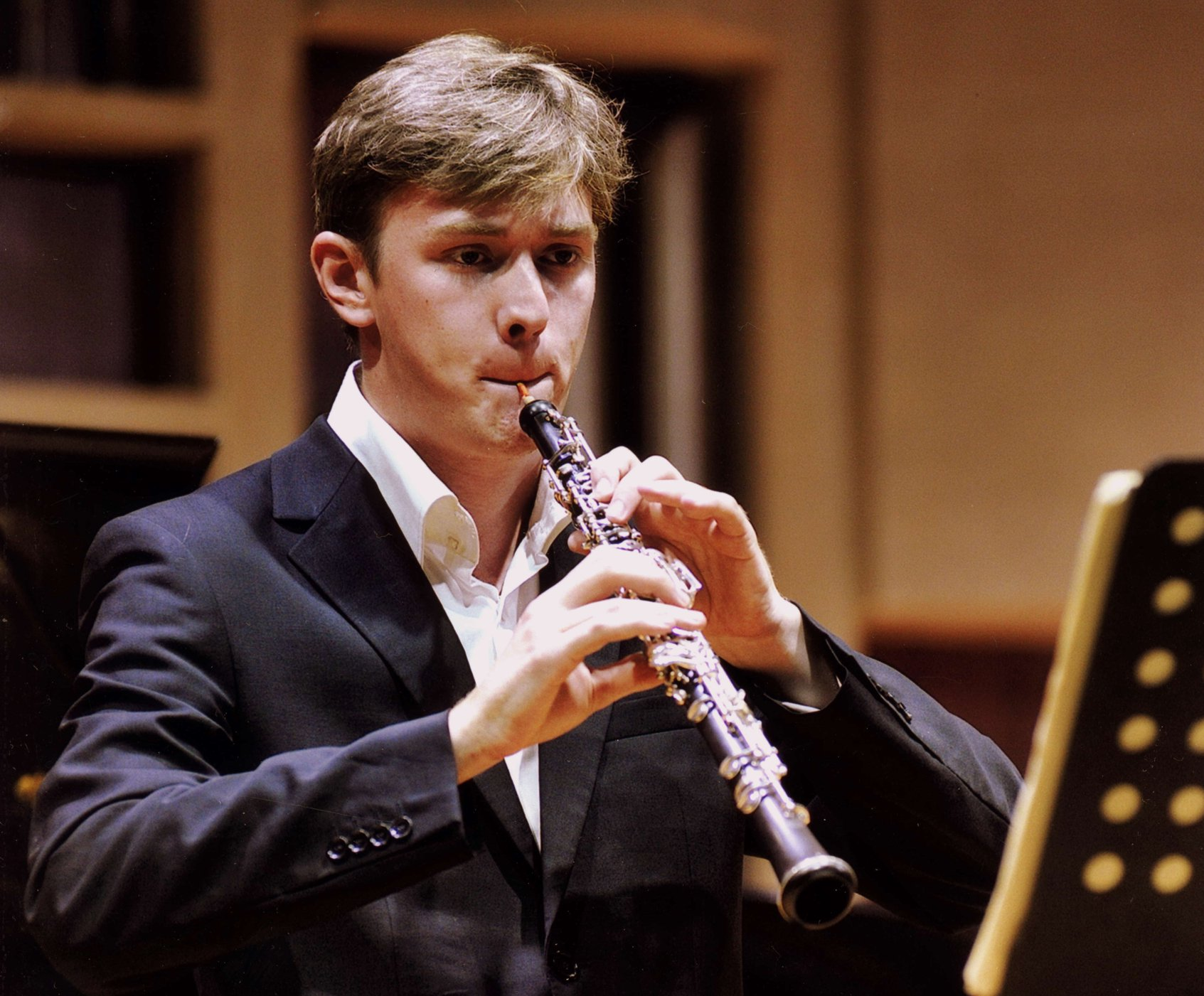

Background information
- Born: 1986; Arkhangelsk, Russia
- Instrument: oboe

Ivan Podyomov (born 1986) is a Russian oboist and currently principal oboe of the Royal Concertgebouw Orchestra.

== Career ==
Ivan Podyomov was born in 1986 in Arkhangelsk, Russia. He commenced his musical education at the Gnessin School of Music in Moscow with Ivan Pushetchnikov. Since 2006 until 2011 Ivan has been studying with Maurice Bourgue at the Geneva Conservatory.

During his studies in Geneva, Ivan Podyomov has won a number of important oboe competitions: ARD International Competition in Munich in 2011, Geneva Competition and Markneukirchen Competition in 2010, the "Sony" Oboe Competition in Karuizawa Japan in 2009, the Prague Spring International Competition in 2008 where he has also won the Bohuslav Martinu Foundation Prize for the best performance of the Martinu oboe concerto.

These successes resulted numerous concerts at major venues around the world: in 2009 Ivan gave his debut with the Deutsches Symphonie-Orchester Berlin as part of the series Debut im Deutschlandradio Kultur at the Berlin Philharmonie. Further engagements followed, including concerts at the Konzerthaus in Berlin and Vienna, Konzert und Kongresszentrum Lüzern, Philharmonie of Cologne and Essen, Auditorium du Louvre and Salle Gaveau in Paris, Victoria Hall in Geneva, at the Lucerne Festival, Salzburg Festival, Prague Spring Festival, Festival of Radio France and Montpellier Languedoc-Roussillon, the Central European Music Festival, the Festival Mäcklenburg-Vorpommern. They were highly acclaimed by critics and audience.

Ivan Podyomov has performed as soloist with the Bavarian Radio Symphony Orchestra, the Munich Chamber Orchestra, the Academic Symphony Orchestra of Saint-Petersburg Philharmonia, the Kammerakademie Potsdam, the Stavanger Symphony Orchestra, the Chamber Orchestra of Geneva, the Czech Chamber Philharmonic, the Collegium Musicum Basel, the Camerata Hamburg, conducted by Michael Sanderling, Yuri Bashmet, Simon Gaudenz, David Afkham, Alan Buribayev, Sebastian Tewinkel, Enrique Mazzola and others.

Among his recent chamber music partners were the Hagen Quartet, Lars Vogt, Yulianna Avdeeva, Dmitri Vinnik, Sabine Meyer, Maurice Bourgue, Jacques Zoon, Sharon Kam, Alexander Bouzlov, Leonardo Garcia Alarcón, Francesco Corti, Olga Watts, Bruno Schneider, Hervé Joulain, Matthias Racz, Julian Bliss, Alois Posch, Niek de Groot, Edicson Ruiz, Hanna-Elisabeth Müller, Polina Pasztircsák, Johannes Fischer, Sine Nomine Quartet.

In January 2014 Podyomov has been appointed as principal oboist of the Bamberg Symphony Orchestra with principal Conductor Jonathan Nott. He also has been frequently playing as the guest principal Oboist with the Orchestra Mozart Bologna and Mahler Chamber Orchestra under the baton of Claudio Abbado, Bernard Haitink and Daniel Harding.

Since 2015 Ivan Podyomov is a Docent at the Hochschule Luzern Musik. In 2016 Podyomov was appointed principal oboist of Royal Concertgebouw orchestra. He shares the position with Alexei Ogrintchouk.
