= Christian Kunert =

German bassoonist

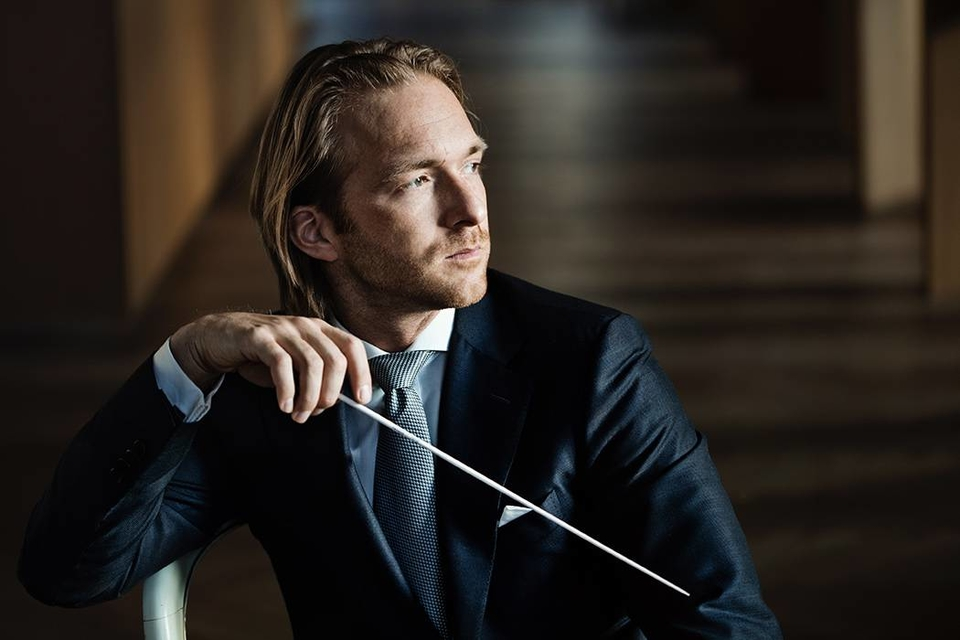
Christian Kunert

Christian M. Kunert (born 1983) is a German bassoonist, lecturer and conductor.

== Life ==
Born in Esslingen, Kunert studied piano at the Hochschule für Musik Würzburg with Bernd Glemser and bassoon with Albrecht Holder. In 2003, while still a student, he became bassoonist with the Staatsorchester Stuttgart.

As a pupil, he had won prizes at the national level of the Jugend musiziert competition in the bassoon quartet, wind quintet, piano solo and bassoon solo categories. In 2007, he received the Eduard Söring Prize of the Foundation for the Promotion of the Hamburg State Opera; in 2008 he won second prize in the bassoon category and the audience prize at the 57th ARD International Music Competition in Munich.

In 2005, at the age of 22, he became principal bassoonist of the Philharmonisches Staatsorchester Hamburg. Since October 2010 he has been a professor for bassoon at the Hochschule für Musik und Theater Hamburg.

In 2018, he left his position at the Hamburg State Opera to dedicate himself to conducting. Since 2017, he has been conducting the Harvestehuder Sinfonieorchester Hamburg.

== Recordings ==
- Henri Tomasi: Konzerte für Holzbläser. Farao Classics, 2010.
- Fagottkonzerte von Antonio Vivaldi, Gordon Jacob, Jean Francaix und Carl Philipp Emanuel Bach. Genuin Classics, 2012.
