= Nabil Shehata =

German-Egyptian conductor and double bassist

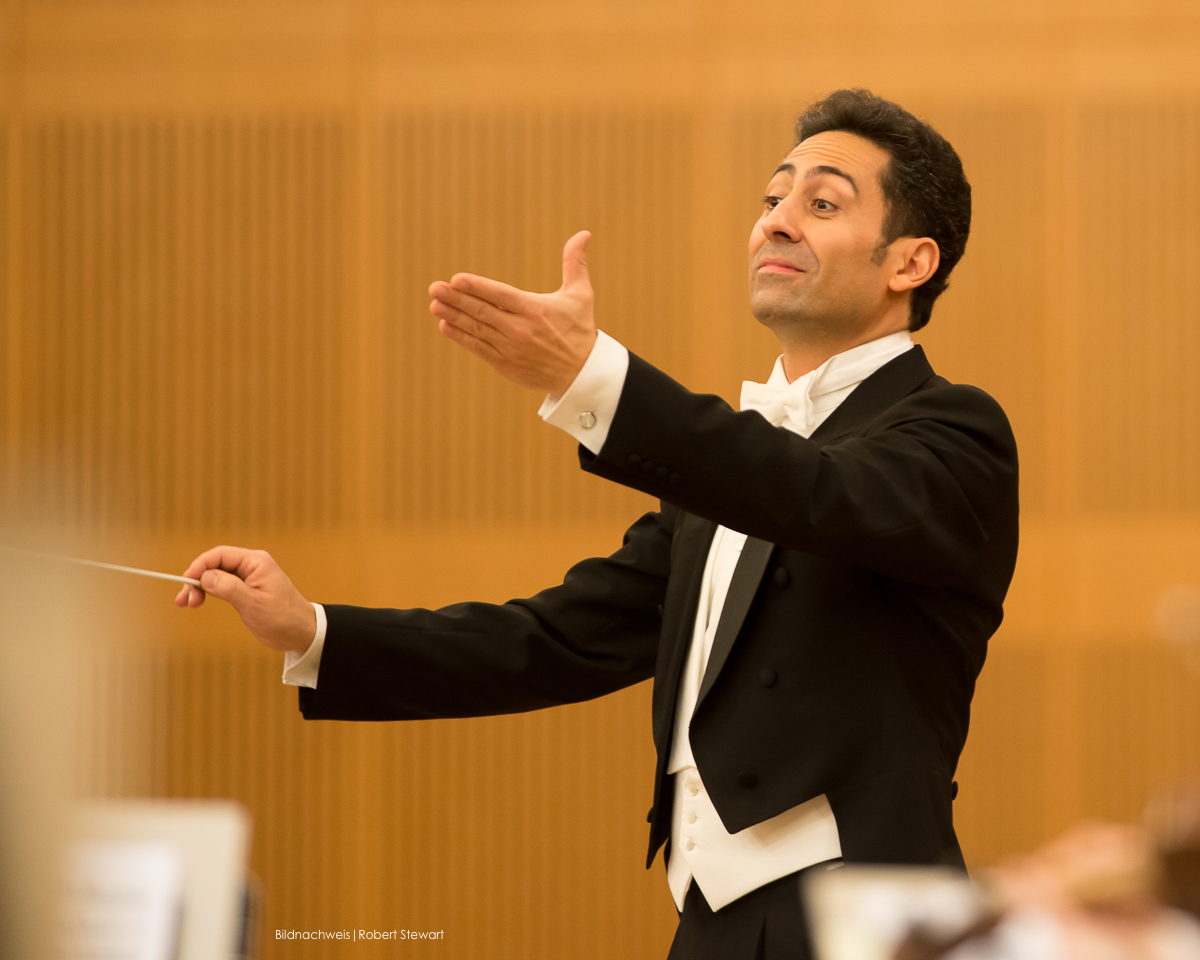
Nabil Shehata

Nabil Shehata (born 1980) is a German-Egyptian conductor and double bass soloist. In 2019 he became conductor and artistic director of the Philharmonie Südwestfalen.

== Biography ==
Nabil Shehata began his career as a conductor in 2006, and has enjoyed the benefit of support and mentorship of Daniel Barenboim, Rolf Reuter, Lawrence Foster und Christian Thielemann. Shehata made his conducting debut in Cottbus in 2007. That same year Shehata made his first international appearance conducting the Simon Bolivar Orchestra in Venezuela followed by a broadening conducting career, including guest engagements with the New Japan Philharmonic Orchestra, Kioi Sinfonietta, Orchestre National du Capitole de Toulouse, Düsseldorfer Symphoniker, Dresdner Philharmoniker, Rundfunk-Sinfonieorchester Berlin, Deutsche Staatsphilharmonie, Stuttgarter Philharmoniker, Münchner Rundfunkorchester and the Philharmonisches Orchester Luxemburg.

During his tenure as chief conductor at the Kammeroper München (2011 - 2019) he led several new opera productions and conducted concerts with singers like Waltraud Meier, Okka von der Damerau, and Robert Gambill.

In 2019, Shehata was appointed to the current position as chief conductor of the Philharmonie Südwestfalen

At the age of six, Nabil Shehata began studying the piano under the guidance of his mother. By the age of nine he started double bass lessons with Thomas Zscherpe. He studied at the Hochschule für Musik Würzburg with Michinori Bunya and subsequently under Esko Laine at the Hochschule für Musik „Hanns Eisler“ in Berlin. While still a student, Shehata won an audition for the principal double bass position at the Staatskapelle Berlin. In 2004, he was appointed principal double bassist of the Berlin Philharmonic, a position he left in 2008 to pursue his conducting career.

== Awards ==
- 2021: Preis der deutschen Schallplattenkritik (German Record Critics’ Award), in the category „Crossover Productions“
- 2018: Opus-Klassik Award for Chamber Music Recording (20th/21st Century Music)
- 2014: Grand Prize Winner of the Washington Award of the S&R Foundation
- 2006: Prätorius Förderpreis (Music Prize) of the State of Lower Saxony
- 2003: First Prize and Audience Award at the ARD International Music Competition Munich.

== Reviews ==
- BBC Music Magazine Choice – December 2021: Orchestral Choice: Saint-Saëns: Cello Concerto, Bacchanale & Symphony No. 1. Astrig Siranossian (cello), Philharmonie Südwestfalen, Nabil Shehata. Chris O'Reilly in Prestomusic 23 November 2021
- „Saint-Saëns: Cello-Konzert Nr. 1, Sinfonie Nr. 1, Bacchanale; Astrig Siranossian, cello, Philharmonie Südwestfalen, Nabil Shehata“. Guido Fischer in Rondo – Das Klassik- & Jazz-Magazin 16.10.2021
- „Beseelte Rhetorik für Saint-Saëns“. „Camille Saint-Saëns: Cellokonzert Nr. 1 | Symphonie Nr. 1 | Bacchanale aus Samson & Dalila op. 47; Astrig Siranossian, cello, Philharmonie Südwestfalen, Nabil Shehata“. Alpha. Remy Frank in the „Pizzicato“ Journal for Classical Music 01.10.2021
- „Works for Double Bass and Piano". Nabil Shehata (double bass), Karim Shehata (piano) Genuin. Gero Schreier in “Das Orchester” 6/2017

== Discography ==
- Camille Saint-Saëns. Cellokonzert Nr. 1 | Symphonie Nr. 1 | Bacchanale aus Samson & Dalila op. 47; Astrig Siranossian (Cello); Philharmonie Südwestfalen; Nabil Shehata. Alpha 2021
- Identigration. Bridges-Kammerorchester. Shehata. Mayrhofer u.a.hr 2021
- Schubert. Mozart. Beethoven: PhilSW in Concert. Philharmonie Südwestfalen. Nabil Shehata. Blu-ray Disc. 2020
- Brahms, Bruch, Glière, Koussevitsky. Werke für Kontrabass und Klavier. Nabil Shehata (Kontrabass), Karim Shehata (Klavier). Genuin 2017
- Mieczyslav Weinberg: Sonate für Kontrabass. Nabil Shehata. CPO 2014
- Gioachino Rossini: Fantasia by Bottesini. Kyril Zlotnikov (Cello), Nabil Shehata (Kontrabass), West-Eastern Divan Orchestra, Daniel Barenboim. Eurokrats 2006
- Harald Genzmer: Musik für Violoncello, Kontrabass und Klavier. Martin Ostertag (Cello), Nabil Shehata (Kontrabass), Oliver Triendl (Klavier). Bella Musical 2005.
- George Onslow. Quintet Op. 81 | Sextet Op. 30. Maálot Quintett. Markus Becker | Nabil Shehata. MDG 2018
