= Markus Leoson =

Markus Leoson, born 1970 in Linköping, Sweden, is a percussionist, cimbalom player and pedagogue.

Markus Leoson began 1986 at the Royal College of Music in Stockholm. In 1990 he was taken on as a percussionist with the Royal Opera Orchestra and was employed there as solo timpanist three years later. In between he was solo timpanist at the Danish Radio Symphony Orchestra. After his first prize at the Swedish Soloist Prize 1995 his solo career accelerated with engagements with several European orchestras, recitals and CD-recordings. 2008 he was appointed professor at the FRANZ LISZT Hochschule für Musik in Weimar, Germany. He has premiered around 60 pieces by international composers of which most of them were dedicated to him.

== Discography (selection) ==
Percussion (Caprice 21466); Marimbolino (nosag CD 059); Markussion (nosag CD 071); Malletiana (Caprice 21743); Colludo (nosag CD 129); Piazzolla, Satie & Other Favourites (dBCD208).

The compositions by Leoson are published by Norsk Musikforlag and Edition Svitzer.

== Honours (selection) ==
1st Prize the Soloistprize, Stockholm (1995); 2nd Prize in the Nordic Soloist Competition, Reykjavik (1995); Artist in Residence at the Swedish Radio (1996–97);1st Prize at the EBU IFYP Competition, Bratislava (1997); 2nd Prize at the ARD Competition, Munich (1997).

Since 2024 member of the Royal Swedish Academy of Music in Sweden.
