= Carlos Duarte (composer) =

Venezuelan musician

Carlos Duarte (June 1, 1957 in Caracas – April 13, 2003) was a Venezuelan composer and pianist.
