= List of compositions by Jenő Hubay =

This is a list of compositions by Jenő Hubay, Hungarian violinist, composer and music teacher.

Genre	Op.	Date	Original title (Hungarian title)	Other title (English title)	Notes
Chamber music	1	1877–1878	Plevna nóta, Magyar fantázia	Chant de Plevna, Fantaisie hongroise	for violin and piano or orchestra
Vocal	2	1873	18 Eredeti magyar dal: 1. Keresztúton állok 2. Zárjátok be már azt a koporsót 3. Ereszkedik le a felhő 4. Sikos a hó, szalad a szán 5. Temetésre szól az ének 6. Szerelem vándorai (Kél a hold az ej lovagja); 7. Boldogtalan voltam 8. Paripámnak az ő szine fakó 9. Mi foly ott a mezőn?; 10. Gyere lovam hadd tegyem fel nyergem!; 11. Kis furulyám szomorúfűz ága 12. Száll a felhő magasan 13. Nem háboritom-e nyugalmad?; 14. Árvalányhaj a süvegem bokrétája 15. Rózsabokor a domboldalon 16. A szerelem, a szerelam 17. Nem tesz föl a lyány magában egyebet 18. Hozzám jösz-e?	18 Original Hungarian Songs	for voice and piano; words by Sándor Petőfi; each song accompanied by an original drawing by a Hungarian artist 1. drawing by Gyula Aggházy; 2. drawing by Ottó Baditz; 3. drawing by Lajos Deák Ébner; 4. drawing by Árpád Feszty; 5. drawing by Imre Greguss; 6. drawing by János Greguss; 7. drawing by László Gyulai; 8. drawing by János Jankó; 9. drawing by Ödön Kacziány; 10. drawing by Károly Lotz; 11. drawing by Mihály Munkácsy; 12. drawing by Béla Spányi; 13. drawing by Mihály Szemlér; 14. drawing by Artúr Tölgyessy; 15. drawing by György Vastagh; 16–18. drawings by Mihály Zichy
Chamber music	3 / 1	1880	Szvit Massenet Lahore király című operája nyomán	Suite sur Le Roi de Lahore de J. Massenet (Suite on Themes from Massenet's Le Roi de Lahore)	for violin and piano or orchestra
Transcription	3 / 2	c.1879–1881	Két Massenet-dal: 1. Alkony; 2. Szerenád	2 Mélodies de J. Massenet (2 Songs of Jules Massenet): 1. Crépuscule (Twilight); 2. Sérénade	for violin and piano or orchestra; original for voice and piano
Chamber music	3 / 3	1876	Carmen-fantázia	Carmen, Fantaisie brillante	for violin and piano or orchestra; based on themes from Georges Bizet's Carmen
Chamber music	4	1879	Cigányfantázia	Fantaisie tziganesque (Gypsy Fantasy)	for violin and piano
Chamber music	5	1877–1878	Szvit: 1. Gavotte; 2. Idylle; 3. Intermezzo; 4. Finale	Suite: 1. Gavotte; 2. Idylle; 3. Intermezzo; 4. Finale: Mouvement du premier morceau	for violin and piano; also orchestrated; revised 1881; dedicated to Károly Aggházy
Concertante	5	1877–1878	Szvit: 1. Gavotte; 2. Idylle; 3. Intermezzo; 4. Finale	Suite: 1. Gavotte; 2. Idylle; 3. Intermezzo; 4. Finale: Mouvement du premier morceau	for violin and orchestra; also for violin and piano; revised 1881; dedicated to Károly Aggházy
Chamber music	6	1881	Két darab: 1. Arab panaszdal 2. Lengyel dal	2 Pieces (2 Morceaux): 1. Plaintes arabes 2. Chant polonais	for violin and piano
Chamber music	7	1880	Pusztai emlék	Souvenir of Puszta (Echos de la Puszta; Puszta-Klänge)	for violin and piano; co-composed with Károly Aggházy
Vocal	8	1876	Öt dal: 1. A hold és a liliom 2. Te oly szelid vagy (Oly csöndes vagy); 3. Az elhagyott leány 4. A te kék szemed 5. Rege	5 Songs (5 Lieder): 1. Der Mond und die Lilie; 2. Du bist so still 3. Das verlassene Mägdlein; 4. Dein blaues Auge; 5. Märchen	for voice and piano; Hungarian translation by Zoltán Ferenczi; 1. words by F. Werner; 2. words by Emanuel Geibel; 3. words by Eduard Mörike; 4. words by J. v. Düringsfeld; 5. words by Carl Beck
Chamber music	9	1879	Csárdajelenet No. 1 D-moll	Scène de la csárda No. 1 in D minor (Tavern Scenes; Csárda Scenes; Csárda-Scenen)	for violin and piano or orchestra; revised 1882
Chamber music	10	1876–1877; 1880; 1880	Három darab: 1. Arioso; 2. Ördögtánc; 3. Menekülés	3 Pieces (3 Morceaux): 1. Arioso; 2. Danse diabolique 3. La fuite, Impromptu / Valse-caprice	for violin and piano 1.~2. published 1896 as Zwei Stücke (2 Pieces) by Bosworth & Co. in Leipzig; 1. for violin and orchestra (published 1900); 3. Valse-caprice (published 1894 in Budapest); 3. La fuite, Impromptu for violin and piano or orchestra (published 1896 by Bosworth & Co. in Leipzig)
Choral	11	c.1879	Két férfikórus: 1. Búcsú; 2. Isten segíts	2 Male Choruses	for male chorus and piano or orchestra 1. words by Antal Váradi; 2. words by Mihály Vörösmarty
Vocal	12	1882	Három dal	3 Songs (3 Lieder): 1. J'eus toujours de l'amour 2. Comment disaient-ils 3. Oh! Quand je dors	for voice and piano; words by Victor Hugo
Chamber music	13	1880–1881	Csárdajelenet No. 2 „Kis furulyám: Szomorúfűz ága“	Scène de la csárda No. 2 "My Little Flute" (Tavern Scenes; Csárda Scenes; Csárda-Scenen) ("Ma petite flûte"; "Meine kleine Flöte")	for violin and piano or orchestra
Chamber music	14	c.1881–1883	Három darab: 1. Elégje; 2. Larghetto; 3. Contemplation	3 Pieces (3 Morceaux): 1. Élégie; 2. Larghetto; 3. Contemplation	for violin and piano 1. also for viola and piano
Chamber music	15	c.1882	Két darab: 1. Mese; 2. Májusi dal	2 Pieces (2 Morceaux): 1. Un conte (Märchen); 2. Maggiolata (Chant de mai)	1. for violin or viola and piano 2. for viola or cello and piano or orchestra
Choral	16	c.1882	Négy férfikórus: 1. A magyarok Istene; 2. Ébresztő; 3. Sóhajtás; 4. A hajós imája	4 Male Choruses	words by Sándor Petőfi, József Bajza and Antal Váradi; 1–3. for male chorus or male chorus and orchestra 4. for male chorus and piano or orchestra
Vocal	17	c.1882	Öt dal: 1. Ó, ne hidd 2. Hasonlóság; 3. A patak szélén	5 Songs (5 Mélodies; 5 Lieder): 1. Ne le crois pas!; 2. Ressemblance; 3. Içi-bas; 4. Au bord de l'eau 5. Si j'étais Dieu	for voice and piano 1. words by Lucien Paté; 2.–5. words by Sully Prudhomme
Chamber music	18	1882–1883	Csárdajelenet No. 3 „Maros vize“	Scène de la csárda No. 3 "The Waters of Maros" in C minor (Tavern Scenes; Csárda Scenes; Csárda-Scenen) ("Les eaux de Maros"; "Das Wasser von Maros")	for violin and piano or orchestra
Vocal	19	1878, c.1886	Két Magyar dal: 1. Szeretném itthagyni 2. Ha meghalok vissza járok	2 Hungarian Songs (2 ungarische Lieder): 1. O wie gerne ließ ich da 2. Wenn ich sterbe	for voice and piano or orchestra 1. words by Sándor Petőfi; 2. words by Géza Zichy
Concertante	20	1884, 1888	Brácsaverseny C-dúr	Viola Concerto in C major	for viola and orchestra; orchestration incomplete; movements II and III orchestrated by Lajos Huszár
Concertante	20	1884–1888	Morceau de Concert C-dúr	Morceau de Concert (Concert Piece) in C major	for viola and orchestra; 1891 revision of movement I from the Viola Concerto
Concertante	21	1884	I. Hegedűverseny „Dramatikus“ a-moll	Violin Concerto No. 1 "Concerto dramatique" in A minor	for violin and orchestra; dedicated to Joseph Joachim
Chamber music	22	1884	Romantikus szonáta D-dúr	Sonate romantique in D major	for violin and piano
Vocal	23	1885	Négy dal: 1. Ami benned keresek 2. Profilban; 3. A régi ballada 4. Ó, jer!	4 Songs (4 Mélodies): 1. Çe que je cherche en toi 2. De Profil; 3. Chante quelque vieille ballade 4. Ah! Viens	for voice and piano; words by Elena Văcărescu
Choral	24	c.1885	Négy férfikórus: 1. Szabadság, dicsőség!; 2. Zengjen a dal 3. Nem nézek én 4. Kis harmat gyöngy	4 Male Choruses: 1. Du tropfen Thau, seh' ich dich an	words by Emil Ábrányi and Sándor Petőfi; 1–2. for male chorus and piano or orchestra 3–4. for male chorus a cappella
Chamber music	25	c.1882–1886	Románc F-dúr	Romance in F major	for violin (or viola) and piano or orchestra
Orchestral	26	1885	I. Szimfónia	Symphony No. 1	revised 1923
Chamber music	27	1885	Hat magyar poéma	6 Hungarian Poems (Six poèmes hongrois)	for violin and piano; Nos. 1 and 6 also for viola and piano
Opera	28	1885	Alienor	Alienor (Aliénor)	opera in 4 acts and an epilogue; libretto by Edmond Haraucourt
Vocal	29	1888	Carmen Sylva öt költeménye	5 Poems of Carmen Sylva (5 Gedichte von Carmen Sylva)	for voice and piano; words by Carmen Sylva; 2 additional songs left unpublished in manuscript form: 6. Ich lernte vom Steuermann; 7. Mir wars, die Welt sein mein
Chamber music	30	1887–1889	Virágrege: 1. Virágfakadás; 2. Bimbó és virág 3. A lepke 4. Mámor; 5. Zefír; 6. Elhagyatva	The Flower's Tale (Blumenleben; Petits boutons): 1. Flower Blossom (Knospensprossen); 2. Bud and Flower (Knospe und Blume); 3. Butterfly (Der Schmetterling); 4. Rapture (Liebeswonne); 5. Zephyr; 6. Abandoned (Verlassen und verwelkt)	for violin and piano
Vocal	31	c.1889	Öt Petőfi dal	5 Petőfi Songs (5 Petőfi Lieder): 1. Ade, mein Täubchen; 2. Niemand hat der Blume; 3. Glatt ist der Schnee; 4. Zigeunerlied; 5. Ich stand an ihrem Grabe	for voice and piano; words by Sándor Petőfi
Chamber music	32	1882–1886	Csárdajelenet No. 4 „Hejre Kati“	Scène de la csárda No. 4 "Hejre Kati" ("Hey Katie!") in E major (Tavern Scenes; Csárda Scenes; Csárda-Scenen)	for violin and piano or orchestra
Chamber music	33	1887	Csárdajelenet No. 5 „Hullámzó Balaton“	Scène de la csárda No. 5 "The Waves of Lake Balaton" (Tavern Scenes; Csárda Scenes; Csárda-Scenen) ("The Wavy Balaton"; "The Waves of the Balaton")	for violin and piano or orchestra
Chamber music	34	1887	Csárdajelenet No. 6 „Sárga cserebogár“	Scène de la csárda No. 6 "Yellow Maybeetle" (Tavern Scenes; Csárda Scenes; Csárda-Scenen) ("Le scarabée jaune"; "Der gelbe Käfer")	for violin and piano or orchestra
Vocal	35	1891	Két magyar dal: 1. Hagyj álmodni szerelemről 2. Meg szeretnék halni	2 Hungarian Songs (2 ungarische Lieder): 1. Lasse träumen mich von Liebe; 2. Sterben möcht' ich gerne	for voice and piano or orchestra 1. words by Lajos Bartók; 2. words by Janka Wohl
Vocal	36	1891	Egy rózsa dalai: 1. Lassan hull a hó 2. Szerelmi boldogság 3. Hadd nézzek a szemedbe 4. Kikiáltanám a világba	Songs of a Rose (Lieder einer Rose): 1. Leise fällt der Schnee vom Himmel; 2. Liebesgluck; 3. Lass mich in dein Auge blicken 4. Mocht's jubeln in die Welt	for voice and piano; words by Roza Cebrian, Hubay's wife
Chamber music	37	1889	Két darab: 1. Májusi dal 2. Elmúlt időkből	2 Pieces (2 Morceaux; 2 Stücke): 1. May Song (Fleur de mai; Maiblüthe); 2. From Times of Yore (Des temps jadis; Aus vergangener Zeit)	for violin and piano
Chamber music	38	1892	Két darab: 1. A képe előtt 2. Ablaka alatt	2 Pieces (2 Stücke): 1. In Front of Her Portrait (Vor ihrem Bild); 2. Under Her Window (Unter ihrem Fenster)	for violin and piano 1. also for viola and piano
Chamber music	39	1892	A csalogány dala	Song of the Nightingale (Nachtigallen-Gesang)	for violin and piano or orchestra
Opera	40	1888	A cremonai hegedűs	The Violin Maker of Cremona (Le luthier de Crémone; Der Geigenmacher von Cremona)	opera in 2 acts; libretto by François Coppée and Henri Beauclair
Chamber music	40a	1888	Hegedűszóló A cremonai hegedűs című operából	Violin Solo from the Opera The Violin Maker of Cremona	for violin and piano
Chamber music	41	1891	Csárdajelenet No. 7 „Kossuth-nóta“	Scène de la csárda No. 7 "Kossuth's Song" (Tavern Scenes; Csárda Scenes; Csárda-Scenen) ("Kossuth's Melody"; "Thème Kossuth"; "Kossuth-Thema")	for violin and piano or orchestra
Chamber music	42	1892	I. Noktürn a-moll	Nocturne No. 1 in A minor	for violin and piano
Vocal	43	1890	Talpra magyar		for voice and piano; words by Sándor Petőfi
Choral	43	1890	Talpra magyar		for male chorus or mixed chorus and piano or orchestra; words by Sándor Petőfi
Chamber music	44	1893	Magyar alföldi képek, három karakterdarab: 1. Sírva vigad a magyar 2. Alkonyat; 3. A fonóban	Impressions de la Puszta, 3 Morceaux caractéristiques (Impressions from Puszta, 3 Character Pieces): 1. La joie melée aux larmes (Pleasantly, Sorrowfully); 2. Crépuscule (Twilight); 3. Les fileuses (In the Spinning Room)	for violin and piano
Chamber music	45	1893	Két mazurka: 1. a-moll 2. g-moll	2 Mazurkas: 1. A minor 2. G minor	for violin and piano
Chamber music	46	1893	Három karakterdarab: 1. Első regény 2. Apródcsíny; 3. Gyengéd vallomás	3 Character Pieces (3 Morceaux caractéristiques): 1. Premier roman (First Novel); 2. Coup de page (Page's Prank; Pagenstreich); 3. Tendre aveu (Tender Confession)	for violin and piano
Chamber music	47	1893	Atair, zenei regény öt fejezetben: 1. Női szeszély 2. Megidézés; 3. Lidércfény; 4. Vallomás; 5. Szerelemittasan	Atair, Musical Novel in 5 Chapters (Ataïr, Roman musical en cinq chapitres): 1. Caprice de femme (A Female's Whim); 2. Invocation; 3. Feux-follets, Scherzo fantastique 4. Épanchement (Declaration of Love); 5. Grisé d'amour (Drunk with Love)	for violin and piano
Chamber music	48	1894	Három darab: 1. Ballada „Amiről a hold mesél“; 2. Intermezzo; 3. Serenata	3 Pieces (3 Morceaux): 1. Ballade "Ce que la lune raconte" 2. Intermezzo; 3. Serenata	for violin and piano
Chamber music	49	1894	Mozaik, Tíz darab: 1. Emlék; 2. Panasz; 3. A fák alatt 4. Ima; 5. Barcarolle; 6. Jelenés; 7. Édes együttlét 8. Sóhaj; 9. Álmodozás; 10. Gyötrelem	Mosaïque, 10 Morceaux (Mosaic, 10 Pieces): 1. Recollections; 2. Souvenir; 3. Sous les arbres (Under the Trees); 4. Prière (Prayer; Gebet); 5. Barcarolle; 6. Vision (Apparition); 7. À vous qui êtes là (Sweet Togetherness); 8. Soupir (Sigh); 9. Rêverie; 10. Tourment (Torment)	for violin and piano: 9. also for viola and piano
Opera	50	1893	A falu rossza	The Village Vagabond (Le rôdeur du village; Der Dorflump)	Hungarian opera in 3 acts, 4 scenes; libretto by Antal Váradi after the play by Ede Tóth
Chamber music	50a	1893	Hegedűszóló „A falu rossza“ című operából	Violin Solo from the Opera The Village Vagabond	for violin and piano
Chamber music	51	1893	Öt karakterdarab: 1. Sicilienne; 2. Gavotte; 3. Bolero; 4. Alpesi hangok 5. Diabolikus scherzo	5 Character Pieces (5 Morceaux caractéristiques): 1. Sicilienne; 2. Gavotte; 3. Bolero; 4. Échos des Alpes; 5. Scherzo diabolique	for violin and piano
Chamber music	52	1894	Három darab: 1. Szonett, Egy virághoz 2. Menüett, Öreg dal fiatal időkből 3. Valse caprice, Emlékezz!	3 Pieces (3 Morceaux): 1. Sonnet, A une fleur 2. Menuet, Vielle chanson de jeune temps 3. Valse caprice, Souviens-toi!	for violin and piano
Vocal	53	1894	Öt dal: 1. Vallomás; 2. A szerelem 3. Egy rózsához 4. Álomjáró; 5. Esti zene	5 Songs (5 Gesänge): 1. Bekenntniss; 2. Die Liebe; 3. Zu einer Rose; 4. Der Nachtwandler; 5. Ständchen	for voice and piano 1. words by E. Im Hof; 2. words by Wilhelm Henzen (1850–1910); 3. words by G. Ebers; 4. words by W. Vollhardt; 5. words by E. Müller
Chamber music	54	1895	Két koncertmazurka: 1. d-moll 2. F-dúr	2 Mazurkas de concert (2 Concert Mazurkas): 1. D minor 2. F major	for violin and piano
Chamber music	55	1894	Két cigányfantázia: 1. a-moll 2. g-moll	2 Fantaisies tziganesques (2 Gypsy Fantasies): 1. A minor 2. G minor	for violin and piano
Chamber music	56	1895	Három poéma François Coppée nyomán	3 Poèmes d'après François Coppée (3 Poems after François Coppée)	for violin and piano
Chamber music	57	1895	Pusztai hangok: 1. Kék nefelejcs 2. Nem kell a szőke 3. Páros élet 4. Hm! Hm!; 5. Minek is van szerelem a világon 6. O more, more	Une voyage au Puszta (A Journey to Puszta; Pusztenfahrt): 1. Souviens-toi-de-moi (Forget-Me-Not); 2. Je n'en veux pas de blondes 3. La vie à deux (Married Life); 4. Hm! Hm!; 5. Pourquoi l'amour... (Why Is There Love in the World); 6. Oh tzigane (Oh Gypsy)	for violin and piano
Chamber music	58	1895	Három darab: 1. Elégikus dal 2. Gyengéd szavak 3. Spanyolosan	3 Pieces (3 Morceaux): 1. Chant élégiaque (Elegiac Song); 2. Tendres paroles (Tender Words); 3. À l'espagnol (In Spanish Style; Spanisch)	for violin and piano
Chamber music	59	c.1895	Két magyar fantázia: 1. Rózsacsárdás; 2. Huszárdal	2 Fantaisies tziganesques (2 Hungarian Fantasies): 1. Danse hongroise (Hungarian Dance); 2. Chanson d'hussard (Hussar's Song)	for violin and piano
Chamber music	60	1896	Csárdajelenet No. 8 „Azt mondják nem adnak“	Scène de la csárda No. 8 "So They Say" in A minor (Tavern Scenes; Csárda Scenes; Csárda-Scenen) ("They Say They Don't Give Me"; "À ce qu'ils disent")	for violin and piano or orchestra; The opening melody is that of the Slovak national anthem Nad Tatrou sa blýska.
Vocal	61	1896	Hét dal	7 Songs (7 Lieder): 1. Wenn nicht die Liebe wär! (Were't Not for Love's Sweet Sake!); 2. Er ritt hinaus (Dame Fortune); 3. Hier unter diesem Tannenbaum (Beneath This Linden's Sheltering Leaves); 4. Das Mägdlein und der Dornbusch (The Maiden and the Bramble-bush); 5. Ein Namenszug (A Name); 6. Lenztraum (Dreams of Spring); 7. Herzensbitten (Prayers)	for voice and piano; words by Ernst Weber, T. Resa and August Silberstein: 5. words by Ernst Weber; 6. words by T. Resa; 7. words by August Silberstein
Chamber music	62	1896	Elégikus fantázia	Fantaisie élégiaque (Elegiac Fantasy)	for violin and piano or orchestra
Pedigogical	63	1896	Hat hegedű gyakorlat: a vonó teknikájánok fejlesztésére	6 Etudes for the Development of Bow Technique (Six études de violon pour développer la technique de l'archet) (Sechs Etüden für Violine: die Entwicklung der Bogentechnik bezweckend)	for violin solo
Pedigogical	64	1896	Hat hegedű gyakorlat: a balkéz teknikájánok fejlesztésére	6 Etudes for the Development of Left-Hand Technique (Six études de violon pour développer la technique de la main gauche) (Sechs Etüden für Violine zur Entwicklung der Fingertechnik)	for violin solo
Chamber music	65	1896	Csárdajelenet No. 9 „Czinka Panna nótája“	Scène de la csárda No. 9 Panna Czinka's Tune (Tavern Scenes; Csárda Scenes; Csárda-Scenen)	for violin and piano or orchestra
Chamber music	66	1897	Három darab: 1. Moment musical 2. Búcsú; 3. Repülő fecskék	3 Pieces (3 Morceaux): 1. Moment musical 2. Adieu (Farewell); 3. Vol d'hirondelles (Flying Swallows)	for violin and piano
Chamber music	67	1897	Magyar nóták „Erdő, erdő, sűrű erdő árnyában“	Hungarian Songs "In the Dark Shade of the Deep Forest"	for violin and piano
Vocal	68	1896	Dalok Kury Klárikának: 1. Szomorúság a szívem szerelme 2. Kisgyerek koromban	Lieder an Klärchen Kury	for voice and piano; words by Mihály Szabolcska
Chamber music	69	1897–1898	Csárdajelenet No. 10 „Szalatnai emlék“	Scène de la csárda No. 10 "Souvenir de Szalatna" (Tavern Scenes; Csárda Scenes; Csárda-Scenen) ("Memoirs from Szalatna")	for violin and piano or orchestra
Chamber music	70	c.1897–1898	Cantilène	Cantilène	for violin and piano or orchestra
Vocal	71	1898	Három dal: 1. Romance; 2. Részvét; 3. Leány, volnék király	3 Songs (3 Mélodies; 3 Lieder): 1. Romance; 2. Pitié des choses (Mitleid); 3. Enfant, si j'étais roi (Mein Kind, wenn König ich wär); 4. Aubarde; 5. Blessure rovente 6. Chanson magyare	for voice and piano 1. words by François Coppée; 2. words by François Coppée; 3. words by Victor Hugo; Nos. 4, 5 and 6: unpublished
Chamber music	72	1897	Variációk egy magyar témára	Variations on a Hungarian Theme (Variations sur un thème hongrois) (Variationen über ein ungarisches Thema)	for violin and piano; also orchestrated
Concertante	72	1897	Variációk egy magyar témára	Variations on a Hungarian Theme (Variations sur un thème hongrois) (Variationen über ein ungarisches Thema)	for violin and orchestra; also for violin and piano
Chamber music	73	1898	II. Noktürn A-dúr	Nocturne No. 2 in A major	for violin and piano
Chamber music	74	1898	Két darab: 1. Szomorú gondolatok 2. Bölcsődal	2 Pieces (2 Morceaux): 1. Pensée triste 2. Berceuse	for violin and piano
Vocal	75	1894	Két magyar dal: 1. Kedvesem; 2. Ó mért oly későn	2 Hungarian Songs (2 ungarische Lieder): 1. Mein Lieb; 2. Warum so spät	for voice and piano or orchestra; orchestrated in 1898; 1. words by Janka Wohl; 2. words by József Kiss
Chamber music	76	1899	Hat új magyar poéma	6 New Hungarian Poems (6 Nouveaux poèmes hongrois)	for violin and piano
Vocal	77	1897	Három magyar dal: 1. Minek turbékoltok 2. Addig, addig adnám neked 3. Föltártad előttem szívedet	3 Hungarian Songs	for voice and piano; words by Mihály Szabolcska
Vocal	78	1898	Három magyar dal: 1. Eldobtad a szívem' magadtól 2. Nefelejts; 3. Elmondanám én ezerszer	3 Hungarian Songs	for voice and piano; words by Mihály Szabolcska
Chamber music	79	1899	Tíz karakterdarab: 1. Csónak-dal; 2. Keringő; 3. Vallomás; 4. Szerenád; 5. A forrás 6. Melankólia; 7. Mazurka; 8. Ima; 9. Bölcsődal; 10. A pillangó	10 Character Pieces (10 Pièces caractéristiques): 1. Barcarolle; 2. Valse; 3. Épanchement (Declaration of Love); 4. Sérénade; 5. La source (The Spring); 6. Mélancholie (Melancholy); 7. Mazurka; 8. Prière (Prayer); 9. Berceuse; 10. Le papillon (The Butterfly)	for violin and piano
Chamber music	80	1899	Scherzo g-moll	Scherzo in G minor	for violin and piano
Chamber music	81	1899	Harlekin – Scherzo	Arlequin – Scherzo (Harlequin – Scherzo)	for violin and piano
Chamber music	82	1900	Csárdajelenet No. 11 „Szomorúfűz hervadt lombja“	Scène de la csárda No. 11 "The Willow's Withered Branch" (Tavern Scenes; Csárda Scenes; Csárda-Scenen)	for violin and piano or orchestra
Chamber music	83	1898	Csárdajelenet No. 12 „Piczi Tubiczám“	Scène de la csárda No. 12 "My Little Turtle Dove" (Tavern Scenes; Csárda Scenes; Csárda-Scenen) ("Ma petite tourterelle"; "Meine kleine Turteltaube")	for violin and piano or orchestra
Chamber music	84	1898	Gyermekjelenetek: 1. A gyepen 2. Az első bánat 3. Lepkevadászat; 4. Egyedül az erdőben 5. Bújócska; 6. Katona leszek 7. Nagymama mesél 8. Szappanbuborék; 9. Esti ima 10. Álomban	Scenes from Childhood (Scènes d'enfants): 1. On the Grass; 2. The First Sorrow; 3. Butterfly Hunting; 4. Alone in the Forest; 5. Hide-and-Seek; 6. Playing Soldiers; 7. Grandmother's Tale; 8. Soap-Bubble; 9. Evening Prayer; 10. Asleep	for violin and piano
Opera	85	1897–1898	Moharózsa	The Moss Rose (Moosröschen)	opera (musical short story) in 4 acts and a prologue; libretto by Max Rothauser based on Ouida's Two Little Wooden Shoes
Chamber music	86	c.1899	Három darab: 1. Holdsugár – ballada 2. Tündértánc – scherzo 3. Koncertcapriccio d-moll	3 Pieces (3 Morceaux): 1. Rayon de lune – Ballade (Moonlight – Ballade); 2. Danse des elfes – Scherzo (Dance of the Elves – Scherzo); 3. Capriccio de concert in D minor	for violin and piano
Chamber music	87	1899	Két darab: 1. Napsugár; 2. III. Noktürn	2 Pieces (2 Morceaux): 1. Rayon de soleil (Sunbeam); 2. Nocturne No. 3 (Troisième nocturne)	for violin and piano 1. also for viola and piano
Chamber music	88	1899	Örökmozgó	Perpetuum mobile	for violin and piano or orchestra
Chamber music	89	1900	Tíz koncertetűd	10 Concertant Etudes (10 Études concertantes)	for violin solo
Concertante	90	c.1900	II. Hegedűverseny E-dúr	Violin Concerto No. 2 in E major	for violin and orchestra; dedicated to Oscar Studer
Vocal	91	c.1884	Judit Simon	Judit Simon	Melodrama for voice and piano; words by József Kiss
Vocal	92	c.1904	Ugye Jani		for voice and piano or orchestra, or for voice, violin and piano; words by Imre Farkas
Orchestral	93	1914	II. Szimfónia „Háborús-szimfónia“	Symphony No. 2 "War Symphony"	revised c.1922
Choral	94	1905	Öt vegyeskar: 1. Legenda; 2. Alvó tábor 3. Mi dobog, mi zokog?; 4. Odafenn csillagos 5. Stella maris	5 Mixed Choruses	for mixed chorus; words by Sándor Endrődi
Chamber music	95	1904	Négy darab: 1. Nászmenet; 2. Tenger Csillaga; 3. Elmúlt...; 4. Erdei hangulat	4 Pieces (Vier Stücke): 1. Bridal Procession (Brautzug); 2. Stella Maris (Star of the Sea); 3. Past... – Funeral March (Vorbei... – Marche funèbre); 4. Forest Mood (Waldesstimmung)	for violin and piano Nos. 3–4 also for violin and harmonium
Opera	96	1904	Lavotta szerelme	Lavotta's Love	opera in 3 acts and an epilogue; libretto by Árpád Berczik and Imre Farkas
Choral	97	1903	Három kuruc-nóta férfikarra: 1. Alvó tábor 2. Dunántúl; 3. Rajta kuruc	3 Kuruc Songs	for male chorus
Vocal	98	c.1904–1906	Rákóczi himnusz	Rákóczi Hymn	for voice, tárogató and piano; words by Sándor Endrődi
Choral	98	c.1904–1906	Rákóczi himnusz	Rákóczi Hymn	for male chorus, or mixed chorus or children's chorus and piano or orchestra; words by Sándor Endrődi
Concertante	99	1906–1907	III. Hegedűverseny g-moll	Violin Concerto No. 3 in G minor	for violin and orchestra; dedicated to Franz von Vecsey
Vocal	100	c.1906	Hét dal: 1. Tudom; 2. Szőke leány 3. Szeresd, ne bántsd a gyermeket 4. Hó takarja a hegyeket 5. Mi atyánk 6. Bálban; 7. Zwei Särge (Két koporsó)	7 Songs (7 Lieder): 1. Ich weiß 2. Blonde Maid; 3. O Lieb', o kränke nicht das Kind; 4. Schnee bedeckt schon alle Berge; 5. Vater unser 6. Auf dem Balle; 7. Zwei Särge	for voice and piano or orchestra 1. words by Imre Farkas; 2. words by Sándorné Teleki, a.k.a. Szikra (1864–1937); 3. words by Sándor Sajó; 4. words by Sándorné Teleki, a.k.a. Szikra (1864–1937); 5. words by Imre Farkas; 6. words by Imre Farkas; 7. words by Justinus Kerner
Concertante	101	1906–1907	IV. Hegedűverseny „Concerto all'antica“ a-moll	Violin Concerto No. 4 "Concerto all'antica" in A minor	for violin and orchestra; dedicated to Stefi Geyer
Chamber music	102	1909	Csárdajelenet No. 13	Scène de la csárda No. 13 (Tavern Scenes; Csárda Scenes; Csárda-Scenen)	for violin and piano or orchestra
Vocal	103	1910	Két Petőfi dal: 1. Szeptember végén 2. Ha az Isten ekkép szólna hozzám	2 Petőfi Songs (2 Lieder von Petőfi): 1. Ende September; 2. Wenn es Gott gefiele	for voice and piano or orchestra; words by Sándor Petőfi
Chamber music	104	1910–1911	Két darab: 1. Ballada; 2. Humoreszk	2 Pieces (2 Morceaux): 1. Ballade; 2. Humoresque	for violin and piano; Ballada was originally written for viola and harmonium in 1904 and intended for the pieces of Op. 95.
Chamber music	105	1911	Valcerparafrázis D-dúr	Waltz-Paraphrase (Valse-Paraphrase) in D major	for violin and piano or orchestra
Opera	106	1909–1910	Az álarc	The Mask (Die Maske)	opera in 3 acts; libretto by Rudolf Lothar and Sándor Góth after F. Martos; revised 1924–1930
Opera	107	1908–1909	A milói Vénusz	The Venus de Milo (Die Venus von Milo; La Vénus de Milo)	opera in 1 act with prologue; libretto by Sándor Góth and Imre Farkas after Louis d'Assas and Paul Lindau; revised 1926 and 1932
Chamber music	108	c.1912	Románc és szerenád: 1. Ragyogó nap – románc 2. Sápadt holdsugár – gitarre	Romance et Gitarre (Romance and Serenade): 1. Radieux soleil (Radiant Sun); 2. Pâle rayon de lune (Pale Moonbeam)	for violin and piano
Chamber music	109	c.1915	Orgonacsokor – régi bécsi keringő	Lilacs – Old Viennese Waltz (Bouquet des lilas)	for violin and piano
Chamber music	110	1919	Két darab: 1. Tavaszi körtánc 2. A darázs	2 Pieces (2 Morceaux): 1. Spring Roundelay (Ronde du printemps); 2. The Wasp (La guêpe)	for violin and piano
Chamber music	111	1920	Adieu! – Búcsú előtt	Adieu! – Before Parting	for violin and piano
Opera	112	1914–1918	Karenina Anna	Anna Karenina	opera in 3 acts, 4 scenes; libretto by Sándor Góth and Andor Gábor based on Edmond Guiraud's play from the novel of Leo Tolstoy; published 1922 and 1923; premiere performance in 1923
Vocal	113	1920	Végvári-dalok: 1. Eredj ha tudsz!; 2. Október 6.; 3. Könnyek; 4. Hallga, mi ez...	Végvári Songs (Végvári-Lieder): 1. Go, If Thou Canst! (Geh, wenn du kanst!); 2. 6 October (6ter Oktober); 3. Tears (Tränen); 4. Hark, What Is This... (Horche, horch auf...)	for voice and piano with tárogató ab libitum; words by Sándor Reményik
Choral	114	c.1916–1937	Ara pacis (Béke himnusz)	Ara pacis (The Altar of Peace)	Cantata after a poem by Romain Rolland for soprano, alto, baritone, mixed chorus, children's chorus and orchestra; world premiere September 2000
Chamber music	115	1923	Öt koncertetűd: 1. C-dúr; 2. F-dúr; 3. gisz-moll 4. D-dúr; 5. A-dúr	5 Concert Etudes (5 Études de concert): 1. C major 2. F major 3. G♯ minor 4. D major 5. A major	for violin and piano
Orchestral	116	c.1907–1915	Biedermeier szvit	Biedermeier Suite	
Chamber music	117	1920	Csárdajelenet No. 14 „Lavotta témákra“	Scène de la csárda No. 14 "On Themes of János Lavotta" (Tavern Scenes; Csárda Scenes; Csárda-Scenen) (On the Themes of Lavotta"; "Sur des thèmes de Lavotta")	for violin and piano or orchestra; based on tunes by János Lavotta (1764–1820), composer of verbunkos dance music
Choral	118	1921	Dante: Vita nuova (Dante szimfónia)	Dante: The New Life (Dante: Neues Leben)	Symphony for 4 solo voices, mixed chorus, children's chorus and orchestra
Choral	119	1922	Petőfi szimfónia	Petőfi Symphony	Symphony for 4 solo voices, mixed chorus, children's chorus and orchestra; words by Sándor Petőfi
Chamber music	120	1923	Tavaszi szerelmi dalok: 1. Larghetto; 2. Andante con moto	Love Songs in Spring (Chansons d'amour printanier): 1. Larghetto; 2. Andante con moto	for violin and piano
Chamber music	121	1925	Hat darab: 1. Preghiera (Ima); 2. Seguidillas; 3. Vágyakozás; 4. Velence; 5. Orosz sirató 6. Harangjáték (Carillon)	6 Pieces (6 Stücke): 1. Preghiera (Prayer; Gebet); 2. Seguidillas; 3. Longing (Sehnsucht); 4. Venice (Venedig); 5. Russian Lament (Russisches Klagelied); 6. Carillon	for violin and piano
Vocal	122	c.1920–1922	Négy új magyar dal: 1. Ima; 2. Szeretnem ha a vagyam...; 3. Holdsütésben...; 4. Csak menj!	4 New Hungarian Songs (Neue Lieder): 1. Gebet; 2. Je voudrais te donner...; 3. Ich sah dich in des Mondes Schimmer...; 4. Adieu!	for voice and piano 1. words by Ella Halbert; 2. words by Émile Polak; 3. words by József Kiss; 4. words by Alfred de Musset
Vocal	123	c.1920–1922	Két új magyar dal: 1. Édes szívem...; 2. Pitypalatty dal	2 New Hungarian Songs (Neue Lieder): 1. Könntest du, mein Schatz...; 2. Wachtelschlag	for voice and piano; words by Sándor Endrődi
Opera	124	1933–1934	Az önző óriás	The Selfish Giant (Der selbstsüchtige Riese)	Fairy Tale Opera in 1 act; libretto by László Márkus and Jenő Mohácsi after the story by Oscar Wilde
	125				
Vocal	126	c.1935	Két dal: 1. Megtérés; 2. Csak érted	2 Songs	for voice and piano or orchestra; words by Béla Zerkovitz
Ballet	–	1936	Csárdajelenet	Scènes de la csárda (Csárda Scene; Tavern Scene)	Ballet in 1 act; scenario by V. Lányi
Transcription	–		Air	Air from Suite in D by Johann Sebastian Bach	for violin and piano; original for orchestra
Transcription	–		Chaconne	Chaconne from Partita in D minor by Johann Sebastian Bach	for orchestra; original for violin solo
Transcription	–		Magyar táncok No. 1–10: 1. Allegro molto 2. Allegro non assai – Vivo; 3. Allegretto – Vivace; 4. Poco sostenuto – Vivace; 5. Allegro – Vivace; 6. Vivace – Molto sostenuto 7. Molto sostenuto 8. Presto; 9. Allegro non troppo 10. Presto	10 Hungarian Dances by Johannes Brahms: 1. Allegro molto 2. Allegro non assai – Vivo; 3. Allegretto – Vivace; 4. Poco sostenuto – Vivace; 5. Allegro – Vivace; 6. Vivace – Molto sostenuto 7. Molto sostenuto 8. Presto; 9. Allegro non troppo 10. Presto	for violin and piano
Transcription	–		Szapphói óda	Sapphische Ode, Op. 94 No. 4 by Johannes Brahms	for violin and piano; original for voice and piano
Transcription	–		Solvejg dala	Solvejgs Song from PeerGynt by Edvard Grieg	for violin and piano; original for voice and orchestra
Transcription	–		Larghetto	Larghetto from Sonata in B minor, Op. 1 No. 9, HWV 367, by George Frideric Handel	for violin and piano or orchestra; original for flute and continuo
Transcription	–		Magyar rapszódia	Ungarische Rhapsodie nach der Paraphrase über "Die drei Zigeuner", S.374 by Franz Liszt	for violin and piano or orchestra; original for piano solo
Transcription	–		Valse impromptu	Valse impromptu by Franz Liszt	for violin and piano; original for piano solo
Transcription	–		Elfelejtett keringő No. 1	Valse oubliée No. 1 (Première valse oubliée) by Franz Liszt	for violin and piano; original for piano solo
Transcription	–		Heródiás – közjáték a III. felvonásból	Hérodiade, Prélude from Act III by Jules Massenet	for violin and piano; original for orchestra
Transcription	–		Közjáték keringő formában	Valse intermède by Andor Merkler	for violin and piano
Transcription	–		Capriccio No. 13	Caprice No. 13 (XIIIème Caprice), Op. 1 No. 13 by Niccolò Paganini	for violin and piano; original for violin solo
Transcription	–		Moto perpetuo	Moto perpetuo, Op. 11 by Niccolò Paganini	for violin and piano; original for violin and piano
Transcription	–		Tarantella	Tarantella, Op. 33 by David Popper	for violin and piano; original for cello and piano
Transcription	–		Élégie	Élégie, Op. 3 No. 1 by Sergei Rachmaninoff	for violin and piano; original for piano solo
Transcription	–		Polichinelle	Polichinelle, Op. 3, No. 4 by Sergei Rachmaninoff	for violin and piano; original for piano solo
Transcription	–		Barkarola No. 1	Barcarolle No. 1, Op. 30 No. 1 by Anton Rubinstein	for violin and piano; original for piano solo
Transcription	–		Holnap!	Morgen!, Op. 27 No. 4 by Richard Strauss	for violin and piano; original for voice and piano
Transcription	–		Álom alkonyatkor	Traum durch die Dämmerung, Op. 29 No.1 by Richard Strauss	for violin and piano; original for voice and piano
Transcription	–		Ördögtrilla szonáta	Devil's Trill Sonata (Teufelstriller Sonate) by Giuseppe Tartini	for violin and piano or orchestra
Transcription	–		Cantilena	Cantilena, Op. 48 No. 24 by Henri Vieuxtemps	for violin and piano; original for violin solo
Transcription	–		Hegedűverseny No. 7	Concerto No. 7 by Henri Vieuxtemps	for violin and orchestra
Transcription	–		Sirató	Lamento, Op. 48 No. 18 by Henri Vieuxtemps	for violin and piano; original for violin solo
Transcription	–		Álom	Rêve from Voies du cœur (Die Stimme des Herzens), Op. 53 No. 5 by Henri Vieuxtemps	for violin and piano; original for violin and piano
Transcription	–		Capriccio-Valse	Capriccio-Valse, Op. 7 by Henryk Wieniawski	for violin and orchestra
Transcription	–		Szerelmi álom	Liebestraum by Géza Zichy	for violin and piano; original for piano left-hand
