= Gyula Aggházy =

Hungarian genre painter and art teacher

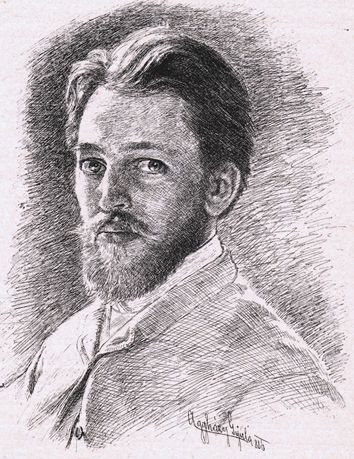
Self-portrait (date unknown)

Gyula Aggházy (20 March, 1850 in Dombóvár – 23 May, 1919 in Budapest) was a Hungarian genre painter and art teacher.

== Biography ==
He started his schooling in Dombóvár, Budapest. Gyula Aggházy's painterly ambitions were not received with great enthusiasm by his father, who definitely intended his son to be a musician. Therefore, after graduating from the conservatory, he signed a contract with the orchestra of the National Theater where he played violin. In parallel, he completed model drawing exercises as a student of Ferenc Újházy, and finally committed himself to painting.

Between 1869 and 1874 he attended the Academy of Fine Arts Vienna and the Academy of Fine Arts, Munich. He studied in the painting department as a student of Carl Wurzinger, Karl von Blaas, Eduard von Engerth and Peter Johann Nepomuk Geiger.

He then trained for another three years at the Munich academy under the leadership of Sándor Wagner. He started working in Munich in 1873, and due to the success of his pictures sent home, he received a state scholarship until 1876.

In 1874 due to a serious illness, he returned to Hungary and after a short stay in Szolnok (a popular gathering spot for painters), he travelled to Paris where he was a pupil of Mihály Munkácsy.

From 1874, he appeared in exhibitions with pictures of folk life and Balaton landscapes. After the turn of the century, he sought motifs from the surroundings of Lake Balaton for his evocative landscapes, and many considered him the "Balaton painter".

His significant and sensational pictures were "The Card Dealer", "The Kneading Wench", and "Forced Concert". His picture "Terefere" won the György Ráth prize of 100 gold (1881), his work "Wedding" received the London Artists' Silver Medal (1908).

Aggházy studied at the academy during the day and was a violinist in a suburban theater in the evenings. He lived with Artúr Tölgyessy, whom he also taught to play the violin. (They met Tölgyessy for the next time in Szolnok in 1875.)

In the summer of 1875, he returned to Hungary, worked for a while in Budapest, and then at the beginning of 1876 he moved to the artist colony in Szolnok, where he spent almost a whole decade studying Hungarian folk life. Between 1887-1896 he was a teacher at the College of Applied Arts and then at the Drawing Training College. His painting Gypsy Woman Card Thrower was made in Szolnok and was exhibited for the first time in Budapest in 1877. His work 'Terefere' was exhibited in the Salon in Paris in 1883, then it was bought for the Hungarian National Museum, and it is currently in the Museum of Fine Arts (Budapest). In 1882, his picture 'Lacikonyha' was bought for the king's collection.

In 1883, he appeared at the first picture exhibition in Cluj (and Transylvania) with the picture "Park detail". In his article of February 11, 1883, the art critic journalist of the Cluj-Napoca Közlöny evaluated the picture as follows:

"The small picture with bending leafy trees, with a hut in the background, and in the foreground, a little boy talking to a stork with a long neck. It is undeveloped, aimlessly scattered and not chosen well enough. The hut in the background is neither aesthetic nor well painted, but in the foreground the little boy and the worldly landscape around him is a modest but pleasant idea." His picture was not received very well.

In 1884, he permanently settled in Budapest in his studio-villa which was designed by Gyula Benczúr, with a Munich influence. In the same year he received a 500 HUF Church Painting Prize for his painting "The Woman Who Breaks Marriage".

In 1885, he spent two months in Italy, studying the fine art collections of Venice, Florence and Rome, the works of the old masters. Among his works presented at the national exhibition in Budapest in 1885, Mosónők was awarded the grand exhibition medal. In 1886, 'No ne izéljen!' was bought for the king.

Between 1887-1896 he was a teacher at the College of Applied Arts, and from 1897 at the Model Drawing School, he was respected as a master by, among others, Sándor Pazsiczky (1881-1955), Jenő Keményffy (1875-1920), Oszkár Mendlik (1871-1963).

In 1897, he became a Professor at the Hungarian University of Fine Arts.

His famous students at the School of Model Drawing and then at the College of Fine Arts included Lipót Ács, Gizella Barabás, Gusztáv Hénel, József Jászay, Kata Kalivoda, Alfréd Lakos, Albert Nyáry, Sándor Pataky and more. Sándor Pazsiczky (1881–1955), Jenő Keményffy, and Oszkár Mendlik respected him as a master.

He excelled as a photographer. His glass negatives are in the custody of the family, the enlargements made of them can be found in the Data Library of the Hungarian National Gallery along with his genre works in the Naturalist style which were very popular.

Gyula Aggházy created the exquisite landscapes of one of the most beautiful rooms of the Opera House, the upstairs gallery of the King's Staircase. The altarpiece of the Loreto chapel of the Matthias Church in Budapest is also his work. He also liked to paint Budapest. Another important work of his was the altar picture on the left side of the church in Erzsébetváros, the "Archangel Gábor". One of the side altars of the baroque church in Tarany (Somogy) is decorated with Gyula Aggházy's painting entitled "Mary's Ascension". The altarpiece of the Bártfa church is also the work of Gyula Aggházy. His work can be found in the Szent Erzsébet Parish Church in Árpád-házi (Budapest, Rózsák tere 8.)

Gyula Aggházy died on May 13, 1919 in Budapest, his grave is in the Kerepes cemetery.

In March 1922, a memorial exhibition was organized in Budapest on the 3rd anniversary of his death. Several portraits of Gyula Aggházy and pictures related to the Mészöly trend can be found in the Hungarian National Gallery.

In 1937, Dezső Ambrozovics, a translator and art collector from Budapest, donated his collection of more than 250 works of art - primarily paintings - to the Ferenc Móra Museum in Szeged, and then Gyula Aggházy's pictures also entered the museum's collection.

At the Winter Exhibition of 2008, the royal palace bought his oil painting "Four-wheel tug at the moonlight", and his picture "Part from Lovranó" also found a buyer.

== Main exhibitions ==
- He participated in the exhibitions of the Transylvanian Fine Arts Society (Cluj-Napoca, 1883, 1890, 1902, 1903)
- He is a permanent exhibitor and founding member of the National Salon, and has also participated in many rural exhibitions.
- Memorial exhibition. Art gallery. On the 3rd anniversary of his death. (with Ferenc Újházy and József Róna, Budapest, 1922)
- Memorial exhibition (Szolnok, 1952).
- In July 2000, Gyula Aggházy's painting in Tihany was included in the exhibition "Hungarian landscape, with a Hungarian brush" of the Bencés Abbey Museum. The exhibition was by Ferenc Mádl in the Mihály Munkácsy Museum in Békéscsaba on the occasion of the 100th anniversary of the painter's death "Spiritual heirs of Munkácsy's art - students, followers".
- In 2000, an exhibition was organized in the Mihály Munkácsy Museum in Békéscsaba on the occasion of the 100th anniversary of the painter's death, entitled "Spiritual heirs of Munkácsy's art - disciples, followers".

=== Selected paintings ===
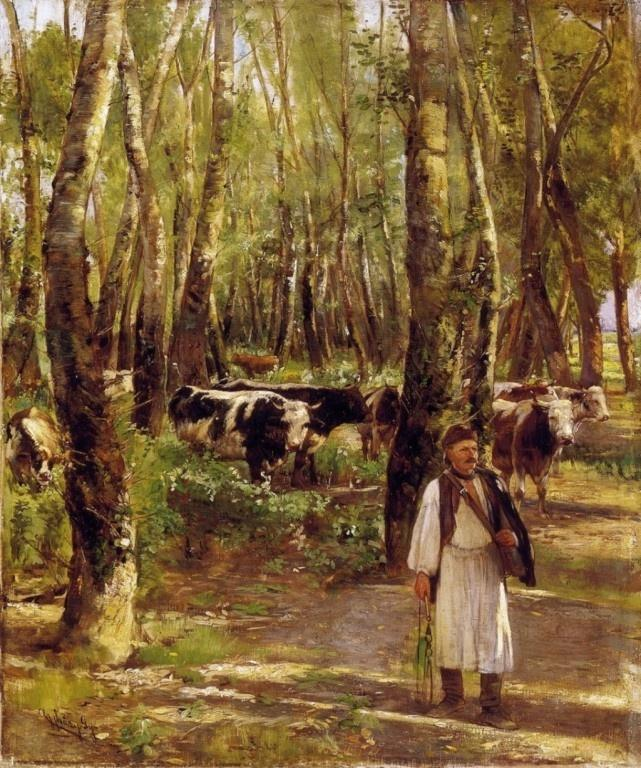
Light in the Grove

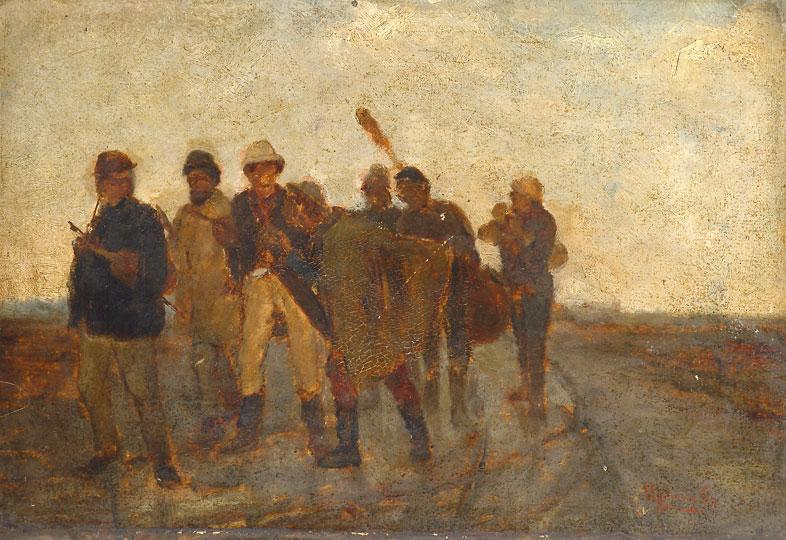
Bridal Musicians

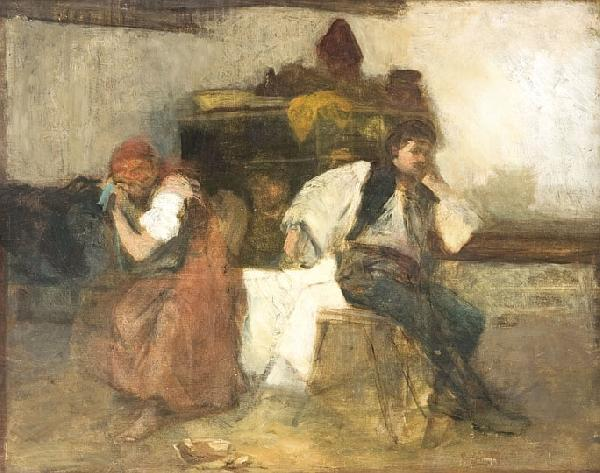
I am Angry with You

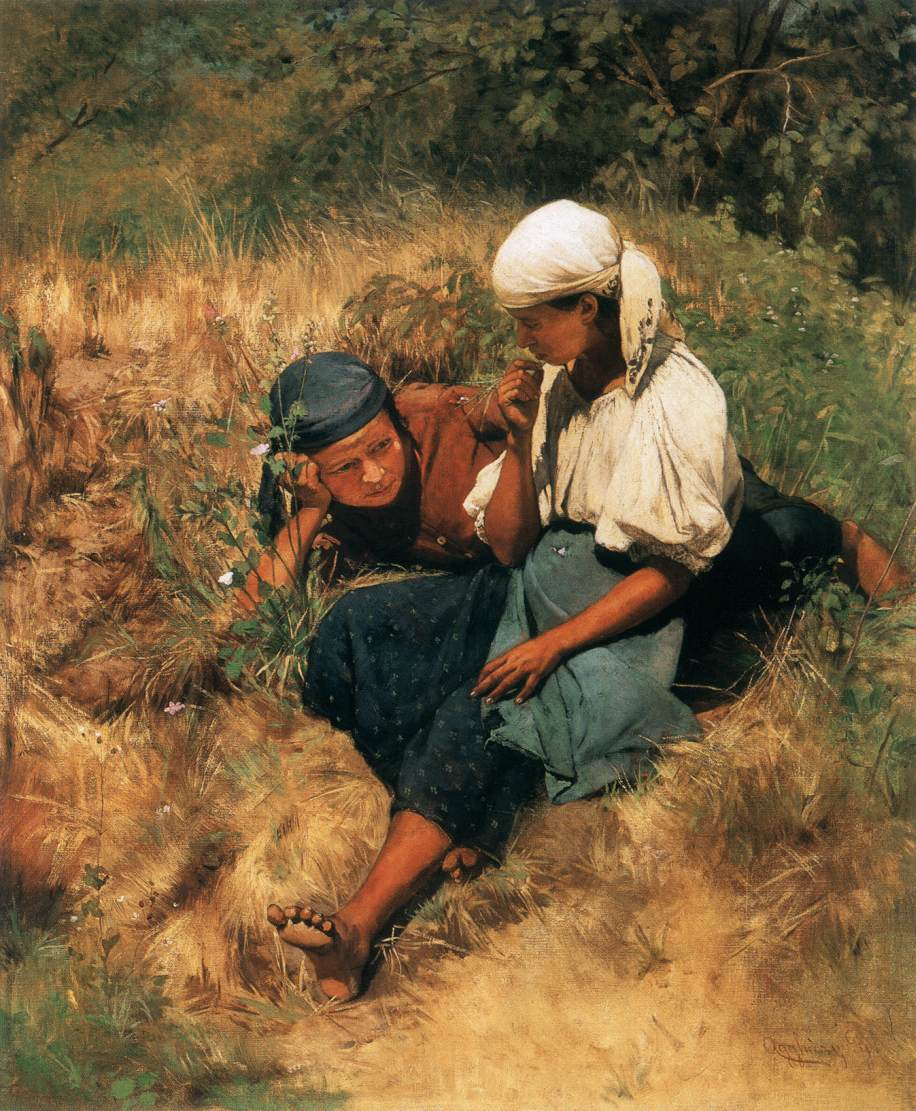
In a Sun-lit Field

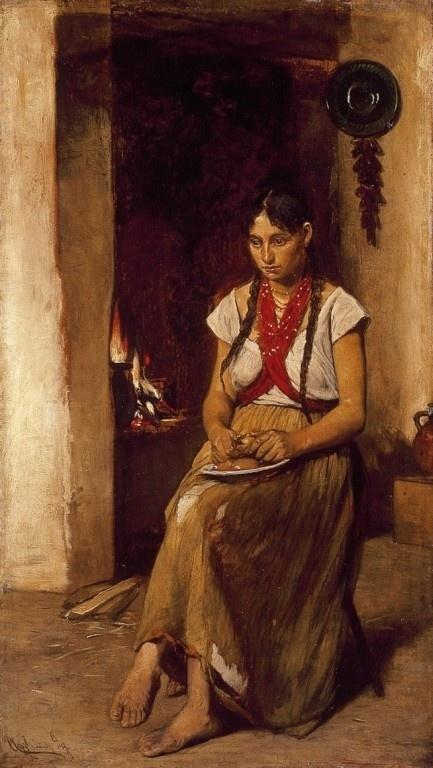
Girl in Front of a Stove
