= Imre Farkas =

Imre Farkas may refer to:

- Imre Farkas de Boldogfa (1811–1876), jurist, landowner, chief magistrate of the district of Zalaegerszeg (főszolgabíró)
- Imre Farkas (musician) (1879–1976), Hungarian musician
- Imre Farkas (canoeist) (1935–2020), Hungarian Olympic flatwater canoer
