= Károly Bura =

Hungarian gypsy musician (1881 to 1934)

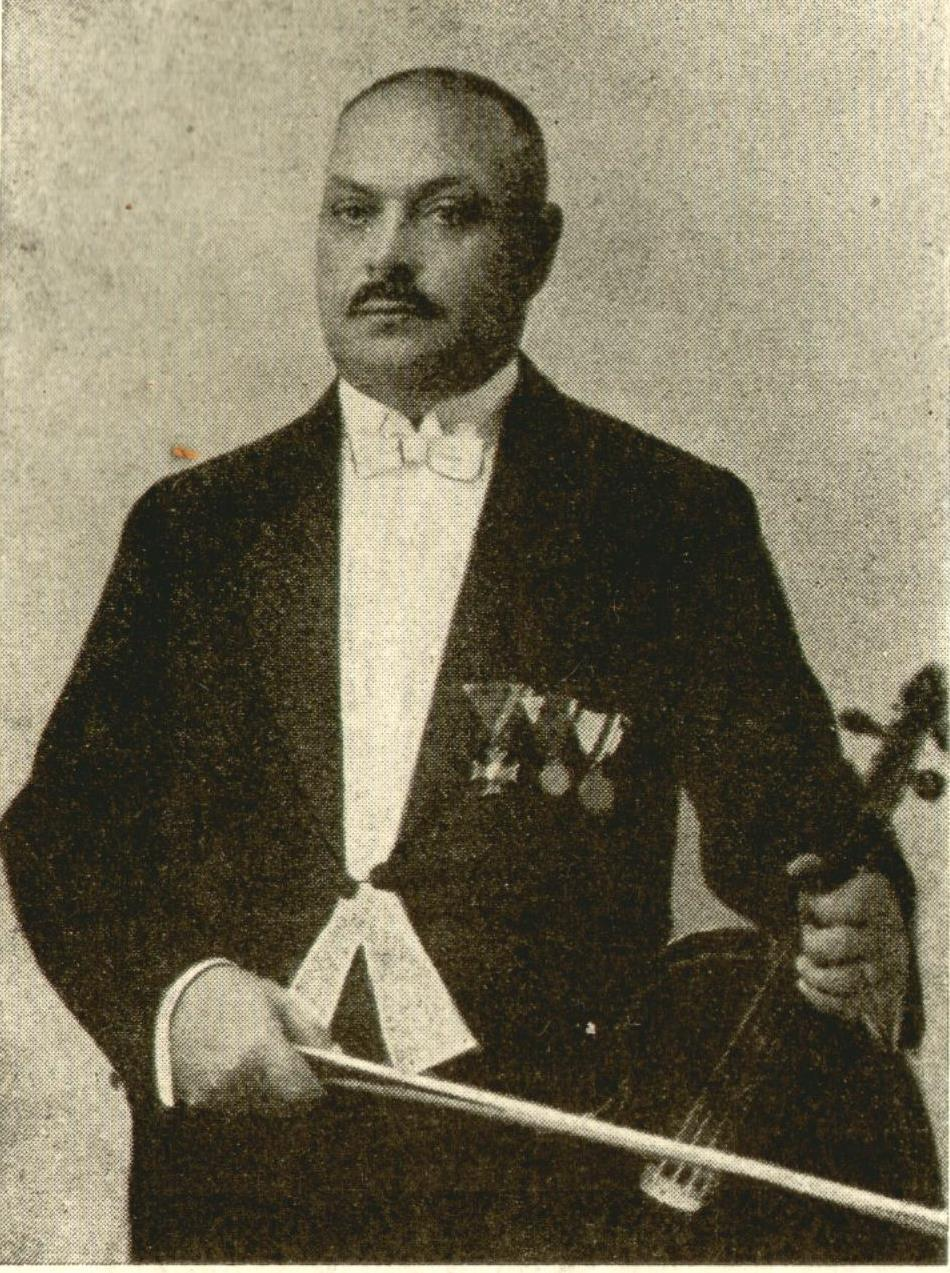
- Born: October 21, 1881; Debrecen, Hungary
- Died: June 1, 1934 (aged 52); Budapest, Hungary
- Burial place: Fiume Road Graveyard
- Occupation: Romani First Violinist
- Spouse: Annuska Radics (m. 1912; died 1925)
- Parent(s): József Bura and Rozália Síró
- Relatives: Sándor Bura

Károly Bura (October 21, 1881 – June 1, 1934) was a Romani Hungarian first violinist and activist, best known for his involvement in various associations for Romani musicians' rights in the early 20th century.

== Early years ==
Bura was born on October 21, 1881 to József Bura and Rozália Síró in Debrecen, Hungary. At four years old, his family moved to Nagyvárad, Hungary (today Oradea, Romania).

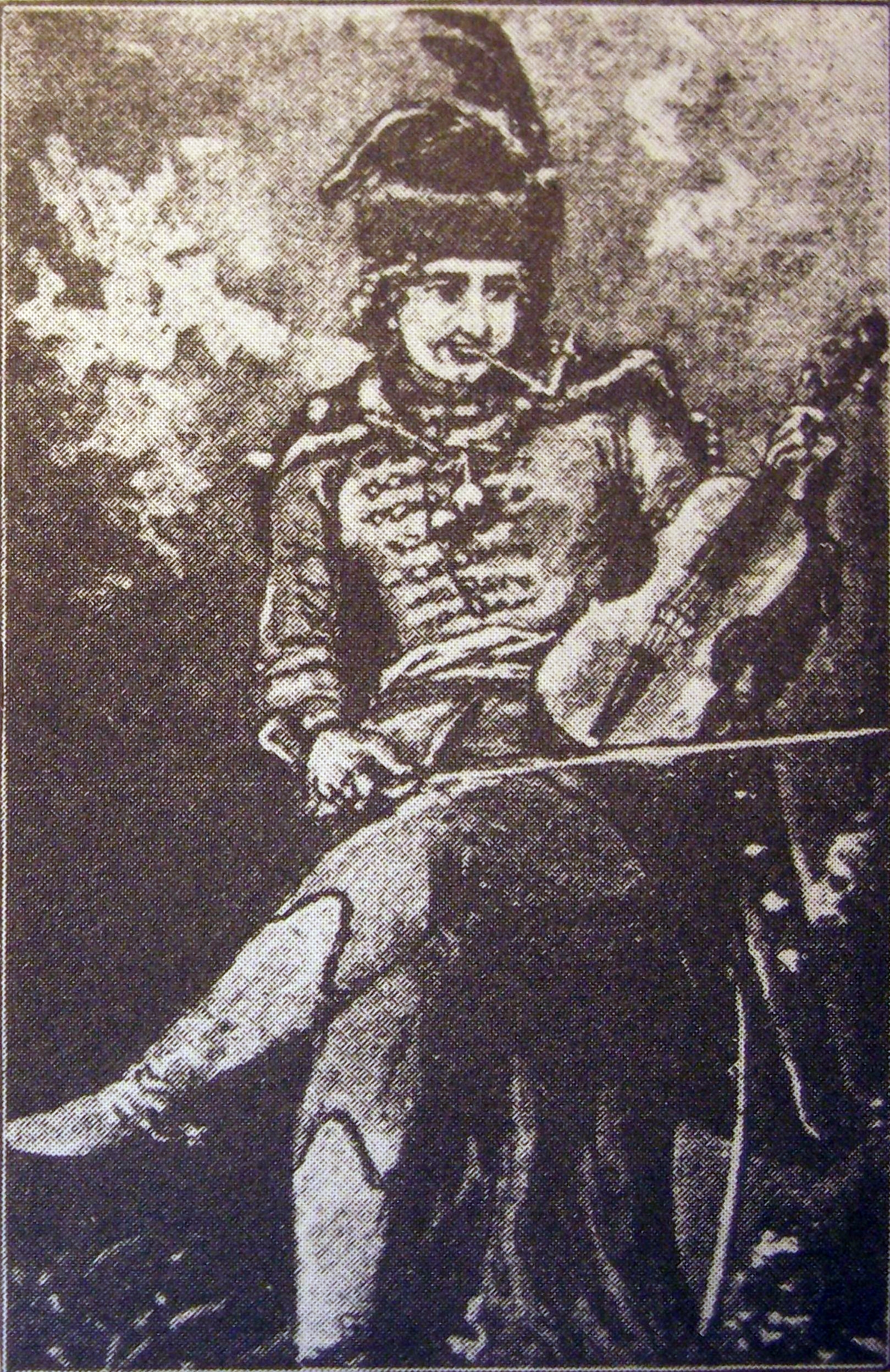
Panna Czinka, an ancestor of Bura and famous Roma first violinist from the 18th century

His father, József Bura, was a musician in many celebrated Romani orchestras, including a well known band led by Miksa Hamza. József taught his sons to play violin at home, setting them up to succeed in the Romani music scene. Bura's younger brother, Sándor Bura, eventually also led his own orchestra.

The family has further ties as Romani musicians, descending from famed 18th century first violinist Panna Czinka. Her band became famous throughout Hungary and set the stage for her ancestors to carry on her musical legacy.

== Personal life ==
=== Marriage ===
After performing in Budapest, Bura met Annuska Radics, a young woman from a prominent Romani family. They were engaged in 1911 and married in 1912. This marriage brought Bura deeper into the Romani Hungarian music circle, as Radics' family was one of the most influential Romani music families of the era. Her father, Béla Radics, and grandfather, Vilmos Radics, had a hand in the establishment of the Hungarian Gypsy Musician's Journal and Hungarian Gypsy Musicians' Association in 1908.

Annuska died at thirty-two in 1925. Bura never remarried, and he went on to travel to her grave in Budapest weekly following her death.

=== The Great War ===
Roma were no exception when it came to Hungary's military enlistment. Romani musicians often were placed in military bands, serving as regimental buglers and drummers - though this did not exempt them from casualty or capture.

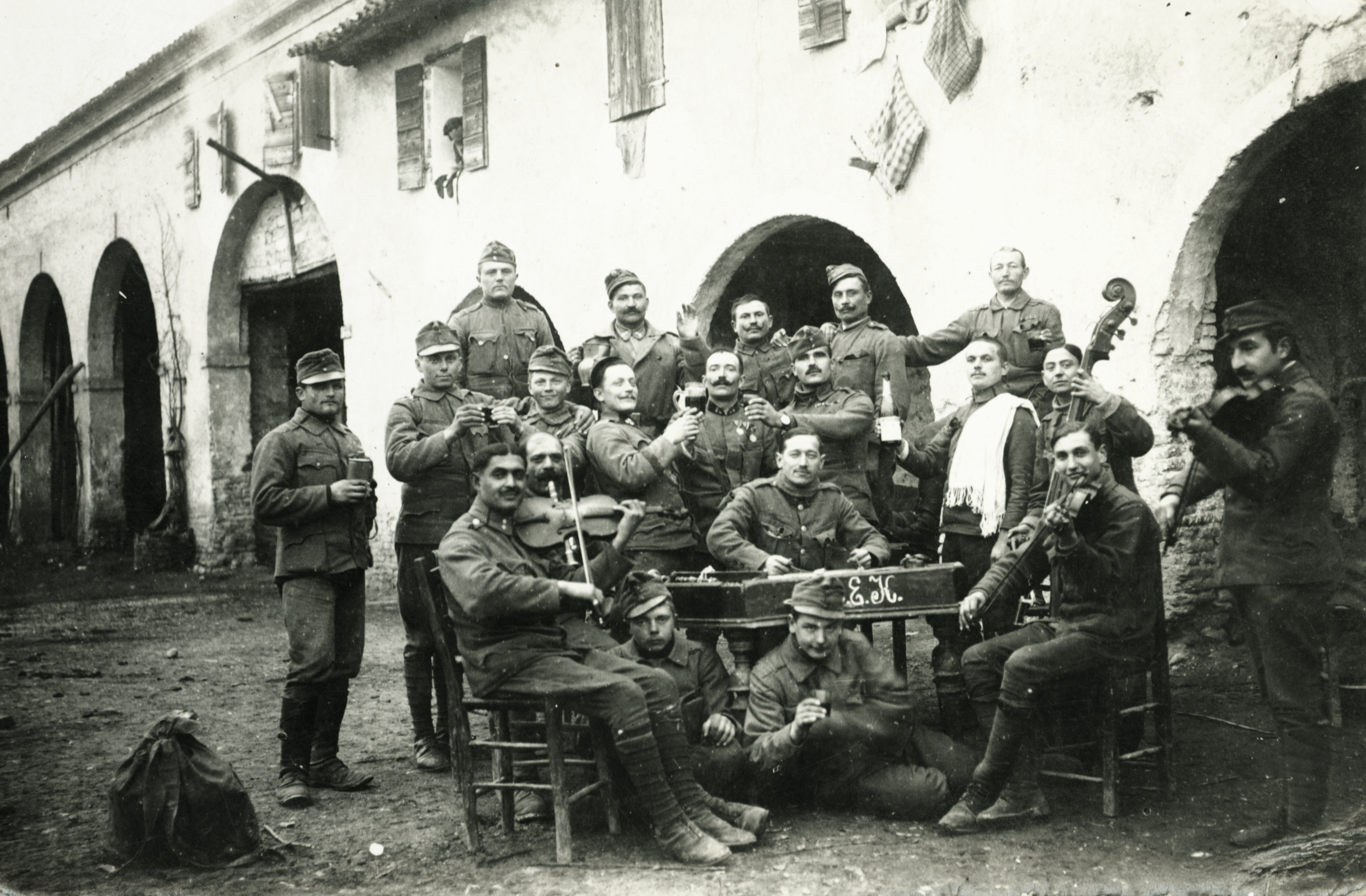
Romani musicians serving in World War I

In 1904, Bura served compulsory military service. After the outbreak of World War I, he joined the 37th Nagyvárad Infantry Regiment where he quickly became a sergeant as he formed an orchestra from the drafted Romani musicians. The band was called the "Imperial and Royal Gypsy Orchestra," dedicated to Archduke Joseph of Habsburg-Lorraine, the commanding officer of the armed forces. It was known to play at train stations to welcome new recruits or build morale for the troops on their way to the front lines.

The 37th Nagyvárad Infantry Regiment soon was deployed to the front where Bura would achieve the rank of staff sergeant and receive many decorations. In 1917, he was severely injured and taken to a hospital in Arad. He returned home to Nagyvárad after his recovery.

== Music and career ==
Thanks to his family ties and talent, Bura went on to lead a long and successful musical career. He began performing as a first violinist at age 16 in 1897. As he gained popularity, his fame became known outside Nagyvárad and he was invited to play in other cities. From 1906 and onward, Bura performed regularly for audiences in Budapest.

=== Budapest ===
In 1927, the restaurant of Budapest's Royal Hotel offered Bura a desirable job, spurring his official move to Budapest. Given that Nagyvárad became part of Romania following the Treaty of Trianon, Romani musicians in Budapest no longer considered him Hungarian—seeing him instead as unfair musical competition. Yet, he and his Romani orchestra quickly became established in Budapest. Through their performances at the Royal Hotel, they were able to perform at other prestigious restaurants and coffee houses. Budapest newspapers declared Bura a sensation, providing interviews and highlighting the adoration he received from audiences.

=== Compositions ===
It is custom in Romani society to compose and dedicate songs to influential individuals, often with the hope of receiving special opportunities or rewards. Bura created and dedicated compositions for various historical figures. In 1902, he created a piece for the crown prince Franz Ferdinand. In a local newspaper, the Nagyváradi Napló, it was noted that in return for this gift, Bura was rewarded with a note of thanks and gold tuning pegs adorned with Ferdinand's monogram. Years later, he was rewarded with a similar note of thanks from the new Hungarian King Charles IV after writing him a "Coronation Memorial March."

Later, in the early 1930s, Bura took time off from activism to focus on his music career. He composed works for state and religious dignitaries, like the "United States March" (also known as the "Hoover March"), and "Marcia Mussolini." When he traveled to Rome to perform this piece for Mussolini, he sought an audience with the Pope, who he also composed for.

== Activism ==
Over his lifetime as a musician and activist, Bura made many contributions to the Gypsy musician community. Along with serving as the president of the Hungarian Gypsy Musician’s National Association, he established the Hungarian Gypsy Musicians' Journal, founded the Bihari Music School, led strikes against the Hungarian Radio, oversaw the Gypsy Musicians' Association joining to the Hungarian Revisionist League, and assisted in the organization of The Festival of Hungarian Song.

=== Hungarian Gypsy Musicians' National Association ===
In the years following World War I, Bura's father-in-law, Béla Radics, pursued on his goals of establishing a Hungarian Gypsy Musicians' National Association to create representation for Romani musicians. The goals of the association included “the progress of financial, moral, intellectual interests”, in addition to “disseminating and developing Hungarian Gypsy musical art."

In 1924 they launched the Hungarian Gypsy Musicians' Journal, whose 1929 mission statement was:

“Our goal is the recovery of the orphaned and abandoned Gypsy musicians’ society, ruined in the storm of time, to improve its economic and social situation and to ensure its cultural and societal progress.”

It offered information including domestic and foreign tours, lawsuits, literature, history, awards, funerals, and weddings.

In 1929, elections for the association were held and Bura ran for the position of acting president. Promising reforms, management of finances, social advancements and training of the young generation of Romani musicians, he was voted in unanimously. His goals as president were to gain recognition of the harm caused by the Treaty of Trianon for Roma communities, and to enroll musicians in the national Social Security Institute. However, his primary goal was to foster Romani musical education in the midst changing trends and the rise of jazz.

=== Bihari Music School ===
As president, Bura proposed and founded the Bihari Music School, named for János Bihari. He gained the financial support of Budapest city leadership, and in 1929, the Bihari School began its first school year with 160 students and 16 staff. It taught both old and young Roma for a modest tuition, almost causing bankruptcy for the Hungarian Gypsy Musicians' National Association.

=== The Festival of Hungarian Song & Gypsy War ===
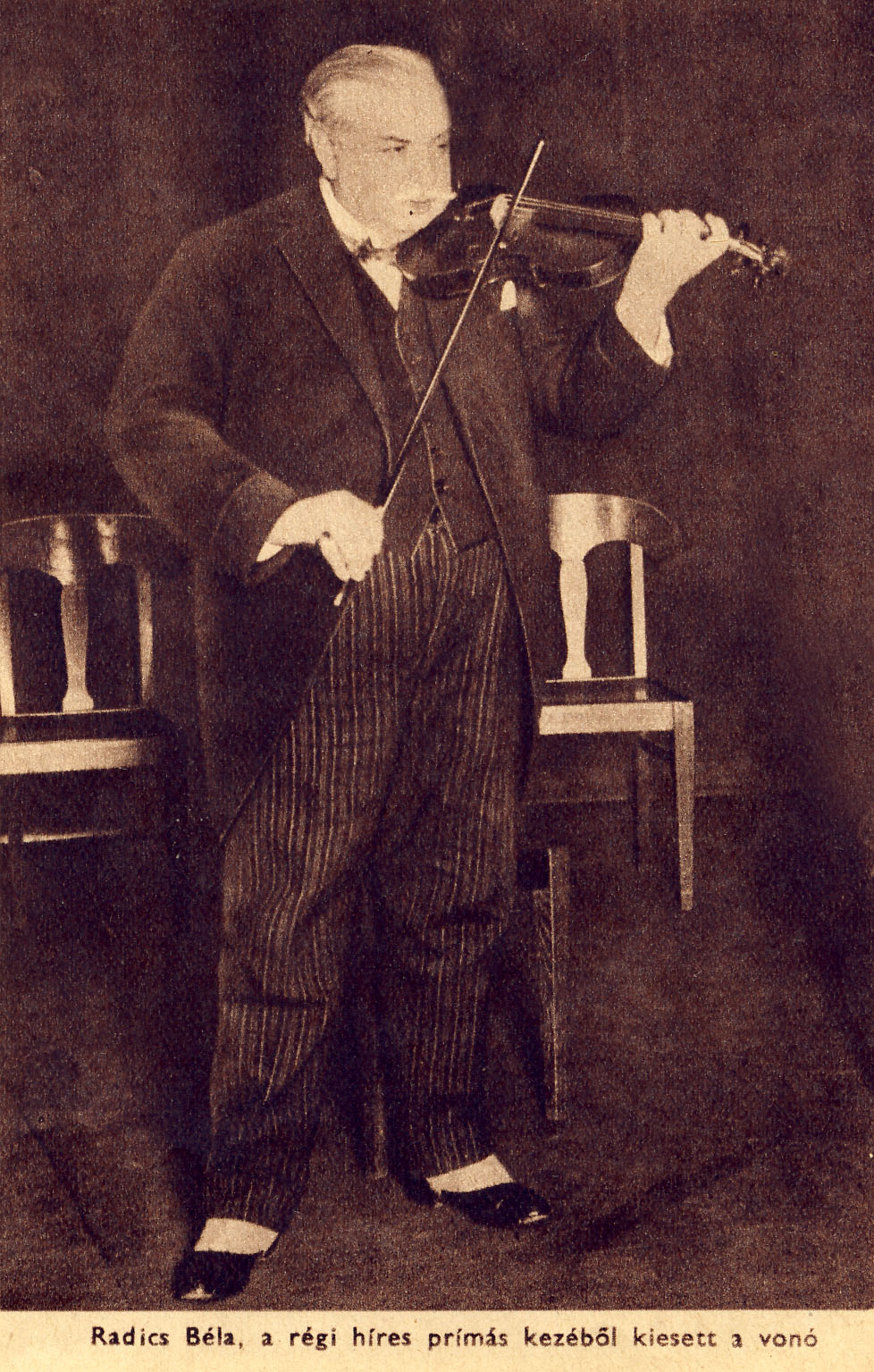
Béla Radics- Bura's father-in-law and founder of the Hungarian Gypsy Musicians' National Association

In May 1930, the Hungarian Gypsy Musicians' National Association organized a Festival of Hungarian Song to raise money for a grave memorial for Bura's father-in-law Béla Radics, who died in May 1930.

The benefit concert took place on Ascension Thursday of May 1930 at Ferencváros Football Club. It attracted 22,000 spectators and was attended by the highest levels of Hungarian society. It was an incredible success, raising more than the sufficient amount of funds.

After the festival, Bura wrote a scathing article in the Hungarian Gypsy Musicians' Journal accusing the organizer of the event, János Ilovszky, of embezzlement. He wrote:

“To this day we have not reclaimed these eight thousand pengős, the assets of the association, thus it is easy to understand that my faith in the results of the accounts have been shaken."

The accusal created a scandalous event, causing the drawing up of a lawsuit and division within the association. Eventually, August 5, 1930, a general meeting of the Hungarian Gypsy Musicians' National Association convened. Bura voiced his accusation, demanding an audit from Ilovszky. Ilovszky provided proof that the funds had been deposited since the beginning, stating that Bura's accusations stemmed from frustration over his name not being prominently featured on festival posters. The audience saw this as proof that Bura no longer prioritized Romani interests, and voted in favor of his dismissal.

Hungarian press deemed this event a "Gypsy War," and Bura was decidedly blamed for it. Unable to accept defeat, he took the musicians faithful to him and founded the Hungarian Gypsy Musician's National Patent Aid and Self-Help Association, but the initiative eventually fell apart due to a lack of funds.

=== Hungarian Radio ===
Romani music was often played by the Hungarian Radio, but in 1933, they appointed a non-Romani man in charge of choosing what was performed on the radio. The Romani musician community strongly objected to this.

Taking action in the name of the Budapest Gypsy Musicians' Association, Bura approached the Hungarian Radio with an ultimatum. It stated that Romani musicians would rather resign from radio broadcasts than allow their music to be in the hands of an amateur, asking for a Roma to be given the position. This ultimatum was rejected—the radio stating that they were not threatened by Roma on strike.

Bura became the leader of the strike, but his health was declining and he was unable to enact further resistance. The strike ended as the radio told various coffee houses to stop employing Romani musicians.

== Legacy ==
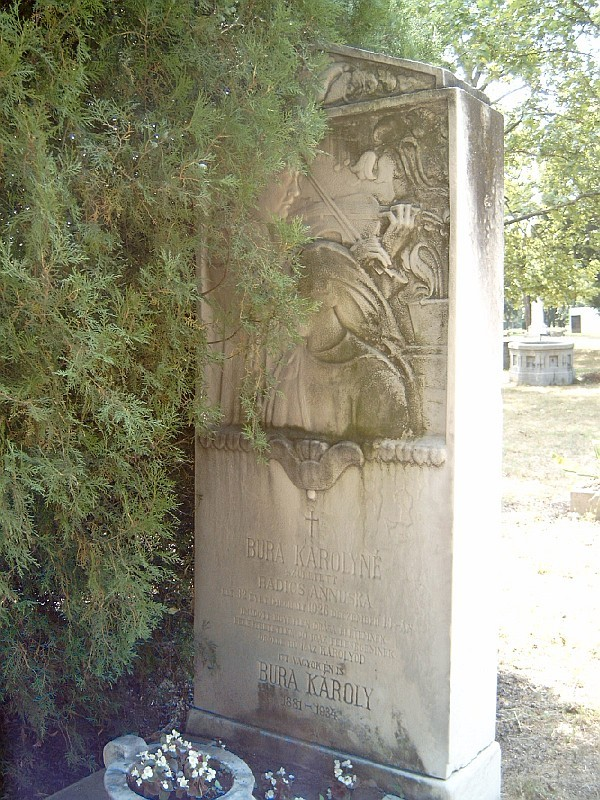
Bura's gravestone in the Fiume Road Graveyard in Budapest.

Bura began experiencing heart pain when his wife died in 1925. On June 1, 1934, he was holding afternoon practice with his orchestra on a restaurant terrace, but ended early due to his poor state of health. Doctors assessed his condition as critical, and Bura was admitted to the Royal Hungarian Railway Workers Hospital. He died at 52 years old around eleven o'clock that night, likely from cardiac issues. His will did not contain much, though his primary request was to be buried next to his wife. He left many of his belongings to his siblings, but left his apartment and many mementos to be donated to a museum. The will stated:

"My flat, in which I have collected the mementos of a lifetime I leave for the possible purpose of establishing a Gypsy museum, for with my death I desire to serve the cause of Gypsy musical life, just as I have served only it all my life.”

Sándor Bura, his brother, donated 18 of Károly’s items to the Historical Department of the Hungarian National Museum in 1935, including medals, badges, awards, and an oil painting. Károly Bura's burial occurred on June 4, 1934, and he was laid to rest in the Fiume Road Graveyard next to his wife and former father-in-law. Many people attended to pay their respects, including a 150-person orchestra that accompanied the procession and hundreds of police to ensure order. The eulogy honored him by stating:

"We, your friends, promise, here by your graveside, to not permit Hungarian song to be put in the grave with you, but in your spirit to fight for Hungarian song!"

== Identity as Romani Hungarian ==
A defining part of Bura's life lies in his identity as a Hungarian citizen with Romani descent.

=== Personal Connection ===
Following WWI, the Treaty of Trianon was signed in 1921 and saw that two-thirds of Hungary's population and territory was ceded to Czechoslovakia, Romania and Yugoslavia. Romania was given all of Partium which included Bura's hometown of Nagyvárad. This ceding would affect Bura for the rest of his life, resulting in a loss of his Hungarian identity, and spurring his ultimate move to Budapest in 1927. Additionally, he would be persecuted by Romanian authorities for years to come, and his community of Romani musicians would become increasingly impoverished due to the treaty.

Because of the strife created by the Treaty of Trianon, Bura took action, writing telegrams to people in power and involving the Hungarian Gypsy Musicians' National Association in patriotic organizations. The association joined the newly founded Hungarian Revisionist League, founded to unify revisionist associations and activities throughout Hungary.

=== History of Romani Hungarian Music ===
Romani music, now primarily found in Europe, varies in musical style across different cultures. As Roma have assimilated across the content, their music tends to reflect their location. Often, Romani music does not offer innovation or new music. Rather, they use creativity to ‘reproduce’ songs, verses and dramatic works. Roma are known to have a great ability to adapt their performance based on their audience. Therefore, some say that a Romani ensemble is just an instrument, as their audience is the real artist.

Romani Hungarian music is known to be the least ‘Roma’ out of all Romani ensembles because of its strong integration with Hungarian culture. In the 19th century, nóta became the most popular form of folk song in Hungary, and is one of a few styles that directly translate to ‘Romani Music.' Romani Hungarian music became a form of national pride and affliction, as all of Hungarian society felt closer to it than any other form of music, going as far as to call it ‘Hungarian National Music’ during the Interwar period.

For Hungarian Roma, music was a common career to pursue, but it was difficult to find success and poverty was common. There were 3,000 Roma musicians in Budapest in 1920, but 2,000 of them were unemployed. As time and technology progressed in Hungary, developments like the radio, gramophone, and jazz genre became rivals to Romani music.
