= Károly Aggházy =

Hungarian piano virtuoso and composer

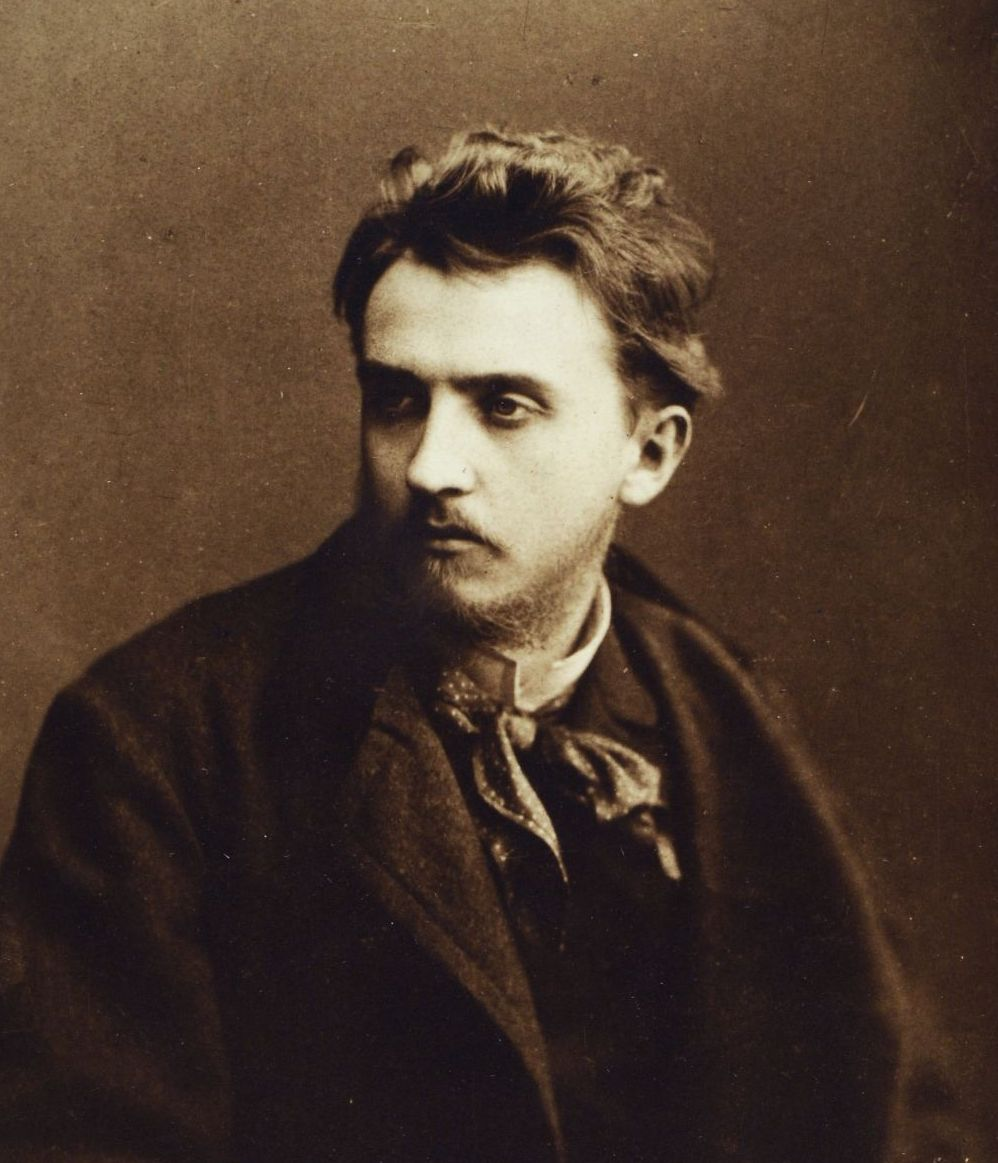
Károly Aggházy

Károly Aggházy [ˈkaːroj ˈɒkhaːzi] (30 October 1855, Budapest – 8 October 1918, Budapest) was a Hungarian piano virtuoso and composer.

Aggházy was a pupil of Robert Volkmann, Anton Bruckner, and Franz Liszt. He later taught at the National Conservatory in Budapest. Besides several operas, most notably Maritta (1895), he chiefly wrote chamber music and pieces for piano. He died in Budapest at age 62.

== Works (selection) ==
List sorted by Opus number

=== Stage music ===
- A Borzáné Marcsája (Mrs Borza's Daughter Marie), comic opera in 3 acts. Together with Jenő Hubay. Libretto by Tihané Almási Balogh. Premiered: 8 May 1880, Budapest, Volkstheater
- Szép leányok (Beautiful Girls). Incidental music by Gergely Csiky. Premiered: 4 February 1881, Budapest, Volkstheater
- A Művészet diadala (Triumph of Art), pantomime in 1 act, op. 28, Libretto: K. Pejacsevich. Composed: 1894.
- Maritta, a korsós Madonna (Maritta, the Madonna with a pint), opera in 2 acts, op. 32, Libretto: Irene K. Fuhrmann. Composed: 1895. Premiered: 14. Oktober 1897, Budapest, Hungarian Royal Opera House. The subject is taken from the book Die Klöster der Christenheit.
- A Ravennai nász (The wedding in Ravenna), opera in 2 acts. Libretto: Dezső Orbán. Composed: 1908.

=== Instrumental and vocal music ===
==== Works with Opus number ====
- Andante and scherzo for orchestra op. 1, 1878
- Tíz magyar dal (Ten Hungarian Songs) op. 5, Budapest
- Nocturne for piano in B Major op. 6, dedicated to Anna Cartwright, C. F. Kahnt, Leipzig, 1885
- Puszta Klänge, dramatic sonata, duet for piano and violin on themes from Hungarian folk music in gypsy style op. 7, Schott & Sons, Mainz, 1885
- Toccata in F Major for piano op. 8, dedicated to Kálmán Chován, C. F. Kahnt, Leipzig, 1885
- Fantasia for piano op. 10, dedicated to Robert Radecke, C. F. Kahnt, Leipzig, 1885
- Hungarian dances for piano op. 11, Harmonia, Budapest, 1885
- Small rhapsodies for piano op. 12, C.F. Kahnt, F.S.S. Hofmusikalienhandlung, Leipzig, 1884
  - Small rhapsody No. 1 in A minor for piano, C.F. Kahnt, F.S.S. Hofmusikalienhandlung, Leipzig, 1884
  - Small rhapsody No. 2 in C♯ minor for piano, C.F. Kahnt, F.S.S. Hofmusikalienhandlung, Leipzig, 1884
- Poëmes hongroise (Hungarian Poems) for piano 4 hands op. 13, Bote & Bock, Berlin, 1887
- Fantasy in the form of variations on the Christmas carol Es ist ein Ros entsprungen (Lo, How a Rose E'er Blooming) by Michael Prätorius for piano op. 14, Bote & Bock, Berlin, c. 1888
- Danse de Noces (Wedding Dance) for piano 4 hands op. 15, Harmonia, Budapest, 1889
- Moment chracteristiques (Characteristic Moments) op. 16, Bote & Bock, Berlin, 1883–1886
- Öt magyar férfinégyes (Five Hungarian Men's Quartet) op. 17, text by Sándor Petőfi and Géza Kacziány (1856–1939)
- Hungarian rondo for piano 4 hands, op. 18, No. 1, dedicated to Leopold Carl Wolf, Bote & Bock, Berlin, c. 1888
- Marcia pour piano à quatre mains op. 18 No. 2, Bote & Bock, Berlin, c. 1888
- Hungarian suite for piano four hands op. 19, Harmonia, Budapest c. 1888
- Variations on the theme "Une fiévre brulate" from the opera Richard coeur de lion by André-Ernest-Modeste Grétry for piano op. 20
- Concert etude for piano in G minor op. 21, dedicated to Franz Liszt, E. Bote & G. Bock, Berlin and Posen, 1886
- Ländlerstimmungen zum Konzertvortrag (Ländler Tunes for Recital) for piano op. 22, Harmonia, Budapest, 1889
- Five Lieder op. 23, text: Nikolaus Lenau, Heinrich Heine, Emanuel Geibel, Wilhelm Friedrich Ruperti, Rudolf Hoyos; Rózsavölgyi & Co, Budapest, 1894
- Fünf Ländler-Impromptus (Five Ländler Impromptus) op. 24, Jules Hainauer, Breslau, 1897
- String quartet in F minor op. 25, 1892
- Trois Mazurkas (Three Mazurkas) for piano op. 26, 1895, Jules Hainauer, Breslau, 1897
- Four capriccios in octaves op. 27, dedicated to István Tomka, Jules Hainauer, Breslau, 1897
- Musique de pantomime (Pantomime Music), after a poem by Countess Katinka Pejacsevics for piano op. 28, Jules Hainauer, Breslau, 1897
- Trois Pièces intimes (Three Intimate Pieces) op. 29, Jules Hainauer, Breslau, 1897
- Six Lieder for voice and piano accompaniment op. 30, text: Heinrich Heine, Roderich; dedicated to Raimund von Zur Mühlen, C. Kieslers Musikverlag, Leipzig, 1898
- Six Lieder for voice and piano op. 31, text: Heinrich Heine, Nikolaus Lenau; C. Kiesler's Musik-Verlag, Leipzig, c. 1896/1897
- Three pieces for piano op. 33
- Nyolc férfinégyes (Eight Men's Quartets) op. 34, text: Gregor Czuczor, Gyula Reviczky, Mór Jókai, Lajos Pósa; Budapest, 1904
- Magyar hangulatok (Hungarian Tunes) for piano op.35, Pesti Könyvnyomda Rt, Budapest, after 1900
- Rákóczi gyászinduló (Rákóczi Funeral March) for wind orchestra op. 36, Budapest, 1905
- Gyászhangok Rákóczi Ferenc emlékére, symphonic poem op. 37, 1905
- Three Amusements, concert etudes in sixths op. 38, dedicated to colleagues at the National Conservatorium in Budapest, Karl Rozsnyai, Budapest
- Eight two-part pieces as preliminary studies on Bach, Karl Rozsnyai, Budapest, c. 1910
- Twelve three-part pieces as preliminary studies on three-part inventions by Johann Sebastian Bach op. 40. Rózsavölgyi, Budapest
- Four piano pieces op. 41, D. Rahter, Leipzig, 1912
- In the forest for piano op. 42, Art Publication Society, St. Louis, 1913
- Piano quintet in G minor op. 43, 1912

=== Works without opus number ===
- Abendstimmung/Impression du Soir (Evening Mood) for violin and piano, dedicated to Jenő Hubay, 1881
- Cinka Panna Dala for voice and piano, Rozsnyai Károly, Budapest, publ. 1907
- La Danse de la petite sorcière (The Dance of the Little Witch) for piano, Le Figaro illustré, 1897
- Elégia (Elegy) for piano, dedicated to Aloyse Bodó, Karl Rozsnyai, Budapest, c. 1910
- Este van már/Es ist schon abend (It's Already Evening) for voice and piano, text: Gyula Vargha; Budapest
- Fantaisie ziganesque (Gypsy-esque Fantasy) for violin and piano, with Jenő Hubay, 1880
- Gavotte for musette, Karl Rozsnyai, Budapest, 1897
- In der Ferne (In the Distance) for voice with piano accompaniment, text: Ludwig Uhland; dedicated to Rose Cebrian, Herrmann Weinholtz, Berlin
- Mint a harmat for voice and piano, Harmonia, Budapest, c. 1910
- Ninon, Sérénade voice and piano, text: after Alfred de Musset, Harmonia, Budapest, 1889
- Rákóczi, symphonic poem for soprano, tenor, baritone, bass, mixed choir and orchestra, text: Gyula Kováts, 1906
- Sárosi-nota/Sárosi-Weise (Sárosi Way), Budapest, 1882
- Serenata alla Chitarra (Guitar Serenade) for piano, Herrmann Weinholtz, Berlin, c. 1884
- Soirées hongroises (Hungarian Evenings) for piano, Jules Hainauer, Breslau, 1895
- Sonata dramatique for piano and violin, c. 1885
- Valse sentimentale (Sentimental Waltz), c. 1885
- Piano quintet in G minor, 1897

== Discography ==
- 2021: Acte Préalable AP0511 – Károly Aggházy - Works for Piano (Sławomir P. Dobrzański)
