= Árpád Berczik =

Hungarian writer (1842–1919)

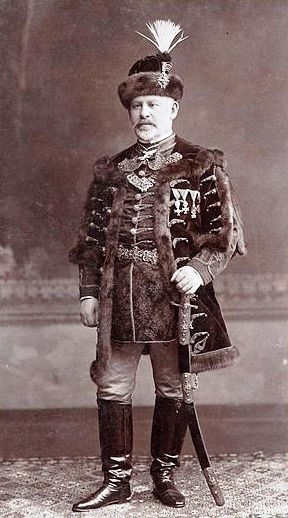
A full picture of Berczik Árpád

Berczik Árpád (8 July 1842 in Temesvár – 16 July 1919 in Budapest) was a Hungarian writer.

He studied laws and worked for the administration, Kisfaludy Társaság (1873) and Borsszem Jankó. He published his writings in publications such as Pesti Napló (1870–72), but he is mainly known for his theatrical plays.

== Works ==
- Az igmándi kispap, (1881)
- Nézd meg az anyját (Bp., 1883)
- A Protekció (Bp., 1885)
- Himfy dalai (1898)
- Színművei (I-V., 1912)
