= Kata Kalivoda =

Hungarian artist (1877–1936)

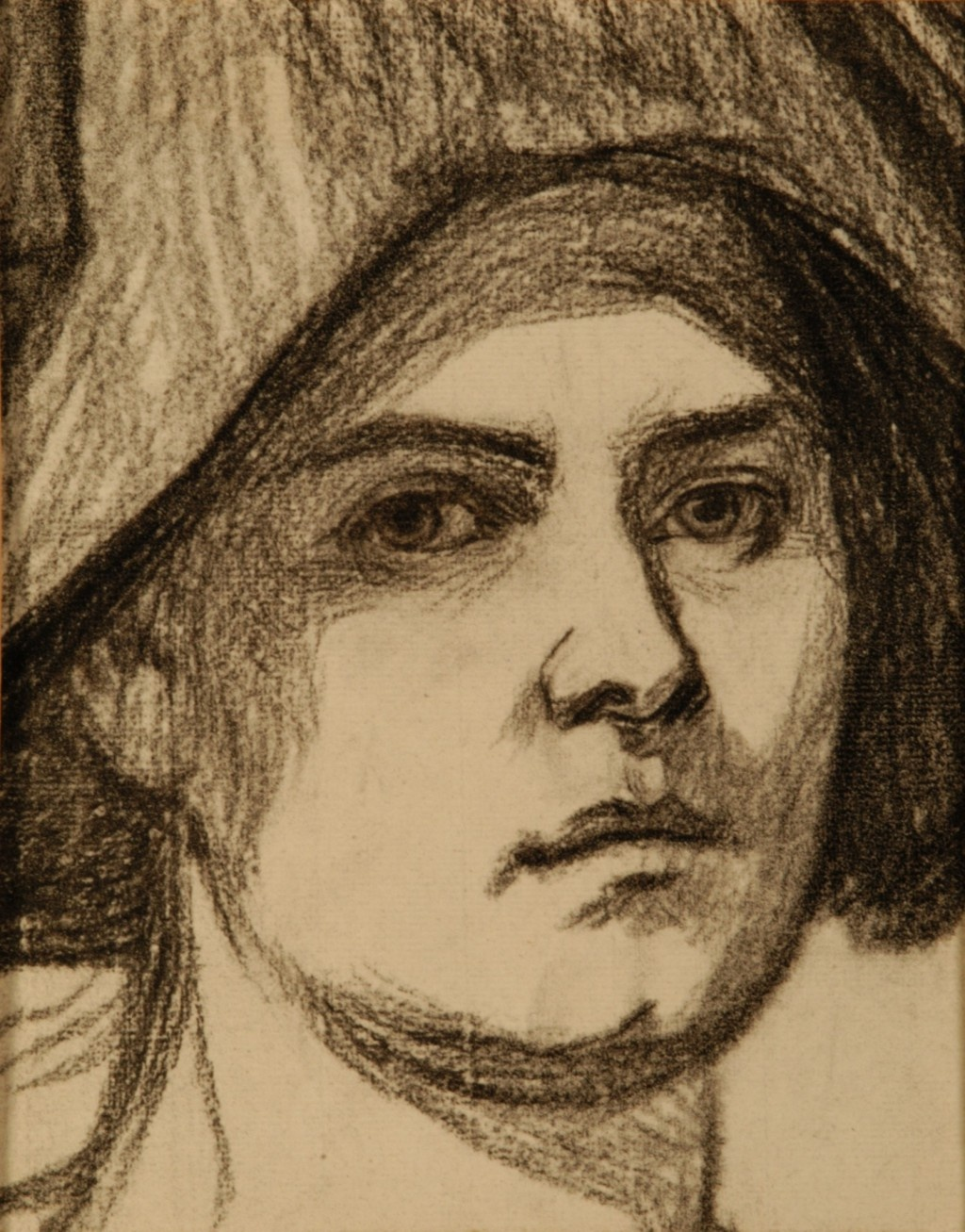
- Born: 6 April 1877; Letenye, Hungary
- Died: 11 May 1936 (aged 59); Szurdokpüspöki, Hungary
- Known for: Painting

Kata Kalivoda (1877-1936) was a Hungarian artist.

== Biography ==
Kalivoda was born on 6 April 1877 in Letenye. She studied art in Budapest at the Mintarajziskolában (School of Design) and the Női Festőiskolában (School of Women's Painting). She traveled to Munich and Paris to study. She spent time at the Artists' Colony in Nagybánya where she was taught by Simon Hollósy. Kalivoda died on 11 May 1936 in Szurdokpüspöki.

== Gallery ==
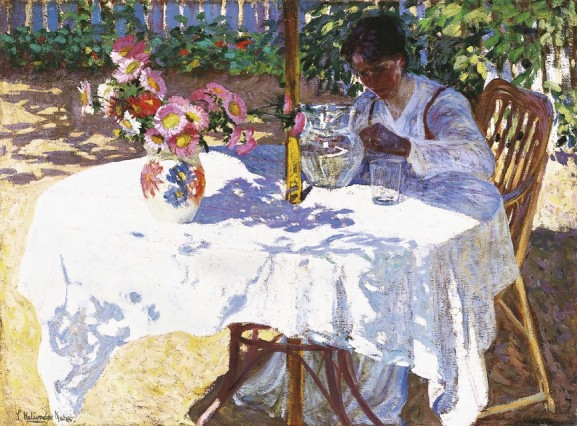
Sunlit Garden in Nagybánya, 1910

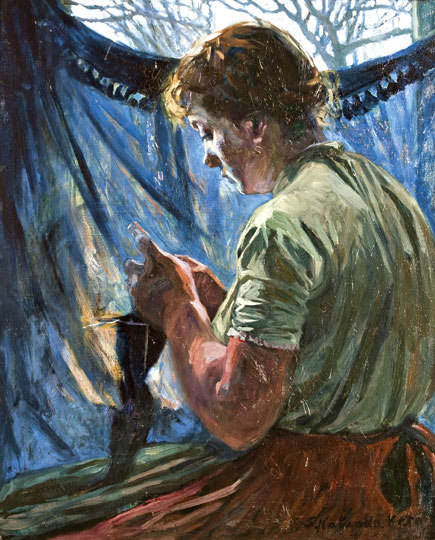
Kézimunkázó lány

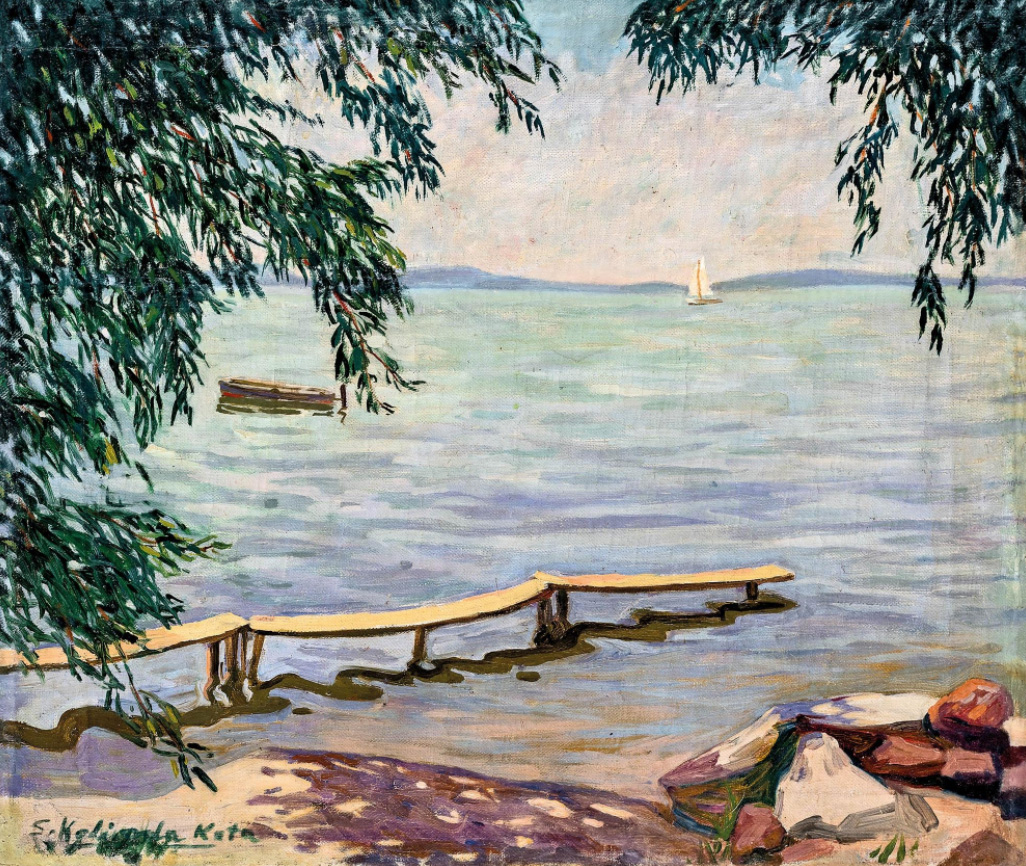
Shore of Lake Balaton
