= József Kiss (poet) =

Hungarian poet and editor

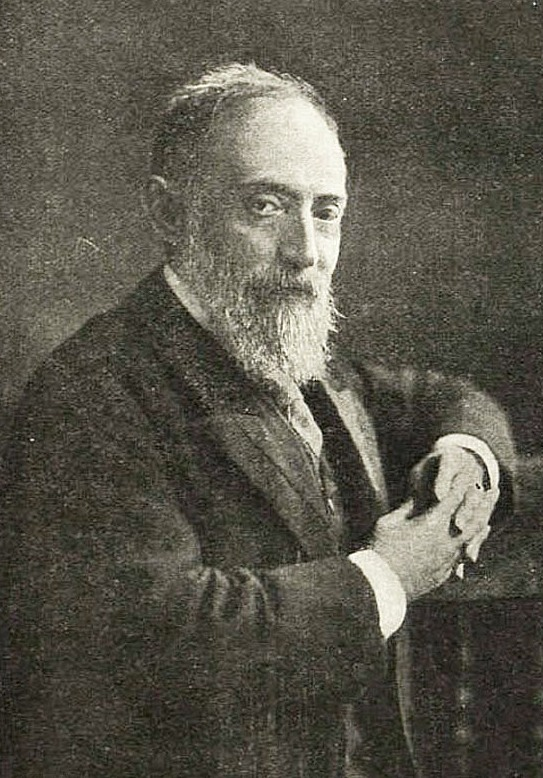
József Kiss (1890s)

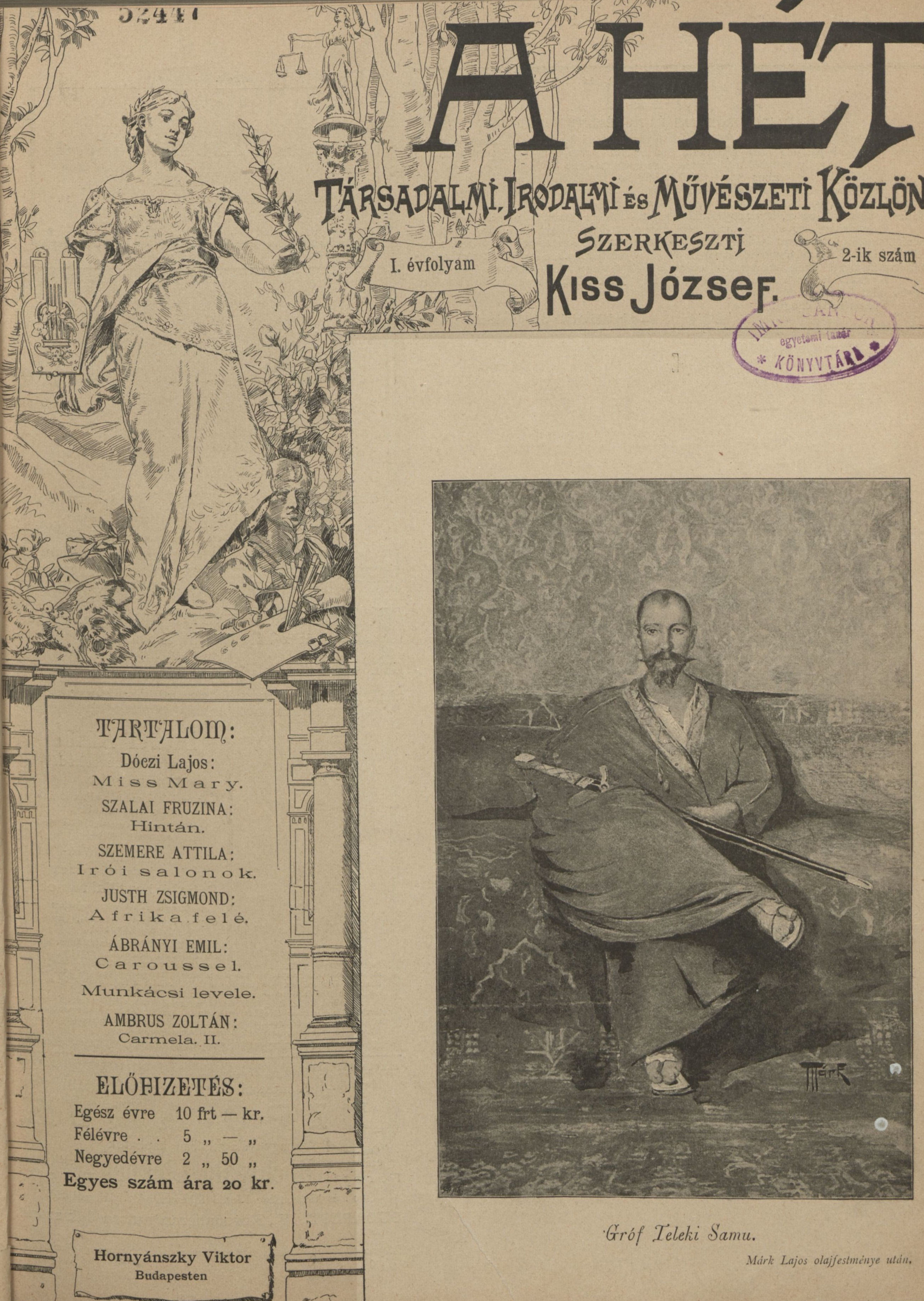
Cover from the second issue of The Week (12 January 1890)

József Kiss (30 November 1843 in Mezőcsát – 31 December 1921 in Budapest) was a Hungarian poet and editor.

== Biography ==
Kiss was born in Mezőcsát. His father, István Klein, was a poor Jewish shopkeeper. His mother was the daughter of a Jewish-Lithuanian teacher who had fled the pogroms. In 1850, the family moved to Gömör és Kishont County, where his father became a Royal tenant farmer. While there, he was introduced to literature by Sámuel Balogh, a Reformed priest. Soon, his parents decided that he should be a rabbi and sent him to study in Miskolc.

In 1856, at the age of thirteen, he fled to Vienna. He eventually returned home and enrolled at the Reformed College in Debrecen. In 1862, when he was 19, his mother died and, around the same time, his father's business failed. Kiss was forced to give up his studies and subsequently spent several years as an itinerant Hebrew teacher, in the cities of the Great Hungarian Plain. In 1867, the year that Jewish emancipation was reproclaimed, with the establishment of the constitutional monarchy of Austria-Hungary, he went to Pest and unsuccessfully appealed to the Jewish community there to support the publication of his first book of poems. He published the volume privately, as Zsidó dalok (Jewish Poems); however, it failed to gain notice.

He then took work as a proofreader at the Deutsch publishing house. From 1870 to 1873, he was the editor of the Illustrated World, a journal he had taken over from Arnold Vértesi. In 1873, he married a distant relative. The following year, he became seriously ill and wrote his novel, Budapesti rejtelmek (Secrets of Budapest) while bedridden. His first success came in 1875 with his long ballad-poem, Simon Judit, which was presented at a meeting of the Kisfaludy Society by Ferenc Toldy. As his popularity grew, so did the controversies surrounding his point of view. The journalist, Jenő Rákosi, was an especially harsh critic. Kiss also translated many of the Psalms into modern language with a contemporary perspective; he had to publish these himself due to dogmatic criticisms.

Since 1882, he had supported his literary activities by working for a French-Hungarian insurance company. When the company failed in 1889, he returned to his editing work and, in 1890, created The Week, a social and literary bulletin. In 1914, he became a member of the Kisfaludy Society.

== Sources ==
- Biography @ MEK
- Biography @ the Magyar Zsidó Lexikon
- The Week (A Hét) @ Epika
