= Ferenc Újházy =

Hungarian painter

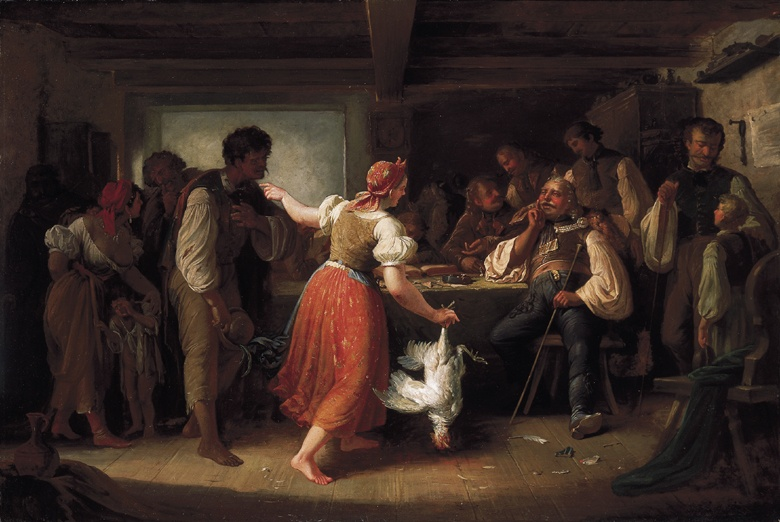
Before the Judge

Ferenc Újházy (8 December 1827, Szolnok - 7 June 1921, Budapest) was a Hungarian painter; known for landscapes with figures, genre scenes and still-lifes.

== Life and work ==
He showed artistic talent at an early age, but his parents wanted him to become a priest. In 1843, they relented; allowing him to study art in Pest. He interrupted his studies to fight as a volunteer in the Hungarian Revolution of 1848. At the Battle of Temesvár, he was wounded and taken prisoner for several months before escaping.

After recovering, he moved to Vienna to make copies of the Old Masters in the museums there and complete his studies. He worked as a drawing teacher for several years when they were complete, then returned to Pest.

His first showing took place in 1851 at an exhibition sponsored by the Pest Art Society. He would become an active member in several such societies, where he advocated for scholarships and pensions for artists. In 1867, he displayed some works at the Exposition Universelle.

A major retrospective was held in 1922. His works may be seen at the Hungarian National Gallery. He was interred at the Kerepesi Cemetery.
