= Imre Farkas (musician) =

Hungarian musician

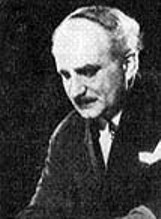
- Imre Farkas
- Born: May 1, 1879; Debrecen, Austria-Hungary
- Died: March 25, 1976 (aged 96); Budapest, Hungarian People's Republic
- Occupations: Musician, composer
- Known for: Contributions to the Nóta style

Imre Farkas (May 1, 1879 in Debrecen, Austria-Hungary – March 25, 1976 in Budapest, Hungarian People's Republic) was a 19th-century Hungarian musician, most famous for his contribution for the popular Nóta style.
