= Artúr Tölgyessy =

Hungarian landscape painter

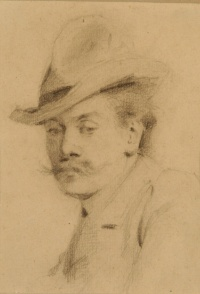
Self-portrait (c. 1900)

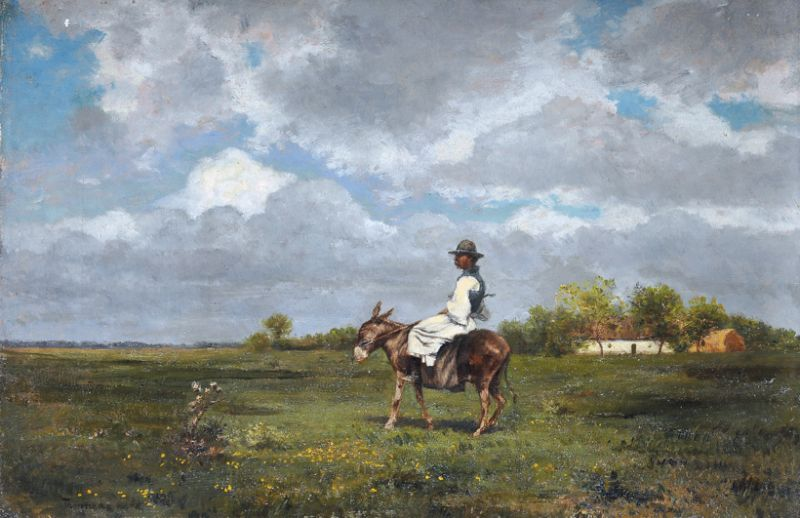
On the Way Home

Artúr Tölgyessy (1 May 1853, Szeged - 2 February 1920, Budapest) was a Hungarian landscape painter; specializing in scenes from the area around Lake Balaton.

== Life and work ==
His father, Ferenc, was a financial officer. After completing his secondary education in Budapest, he went to work for a coat-of-arms painter in Szeged. Rather than take art lessons, he copied the Old Masters at the Museum of Fine Arts in Budapest and, later, at various museums in Vienna. He did eventually enroll at the Academy of Fine Arts, but his stay there was cut short by a personal dispute with Christian Ruben, the Director. He then moved to Munich and studied with Alexander von Wagner. After that, he settled in Budapest, although he travelled extensively; to Belgium, Italy and Paris.

He also made numerous sketching tours to the Great Hungarian Plain and the region surrounding Lake Balaton. After 1875, he paid regular visits to the Szolnok Artists' Colony, as well as to Siófok, where he had a villa built in the early 1890s. He also began exhibiting in the late 1870s, in Vienna, Paris, Munich, and at the National Salon

In 1910, he participated in a large collective exhibition at the Hall of Art. Some of his works may be seen at the Hungarian National Gallery, but most remain in private collections. His "Délibábos puszta" (Fata Morgana) is probably his most familiar work. It was exhibited at the Paris Salon, together with works by Géza Mészöly, Lajos Deák Ébner and Bertalan Karlovszky, and received good reviews in Le Figaro.
