= Nóta =

Form of 19th-century Hungarian popular song

Nóta is a form of 19th-century Hungarian popular song. It is one of a number of styles collectively referred to as cigányzene, which literally means Gipsy music but is used to refer to a number of styles of Hungarian folk music that are played in a typical Gipsy musical style. Nóta includes a variety of tempi, from uptempo friss csárdás via a medium time "Palotas" to slow dramatic tempo rubato ballads.

== Literature ==
- "Zigeunermusik" (Ciganyzene) by Balint Sarosi, Budapest, 1971. (A classical on Gypsy music; available in Hungarian, German and English.)
