= Lajos Deák Ébner =

Hungarian painter

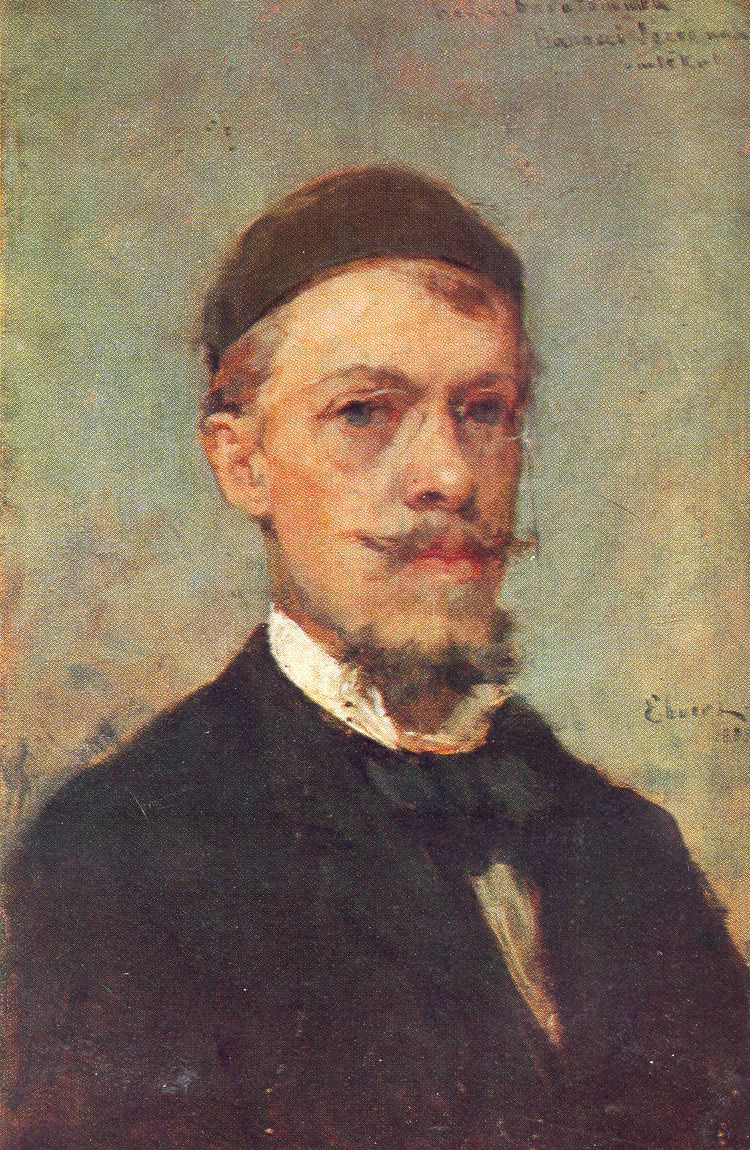
Self-portrait (1883)

Lajos Deák Ébner (18 July 1850 – 20 January 1934) was a Hungarian painter.

== Life ==
He was born in Pest, Austrian Empire. He studied in Munich and Paris, where he joined his fellow painters László Paál and Mihály Munkácsy and came under the influence of the Barbizon school. After 1874, he spent his summers at the Szolnok art colony.

Many of his paintings are realistic portrayals of life around Szolnok. From 1887 to 1922, Ébner was head of the "Budapest School of Painting for Women" (Budapesti Női Festőiskola). In 1890, he and Károly Lotz painted frescoes at Tihany Abbey. From 1895 to 1899 he executed more frescoes at the Kunsthalle Budapest. Ébner died in 1934 in Budapest.

== Selected paintings ==
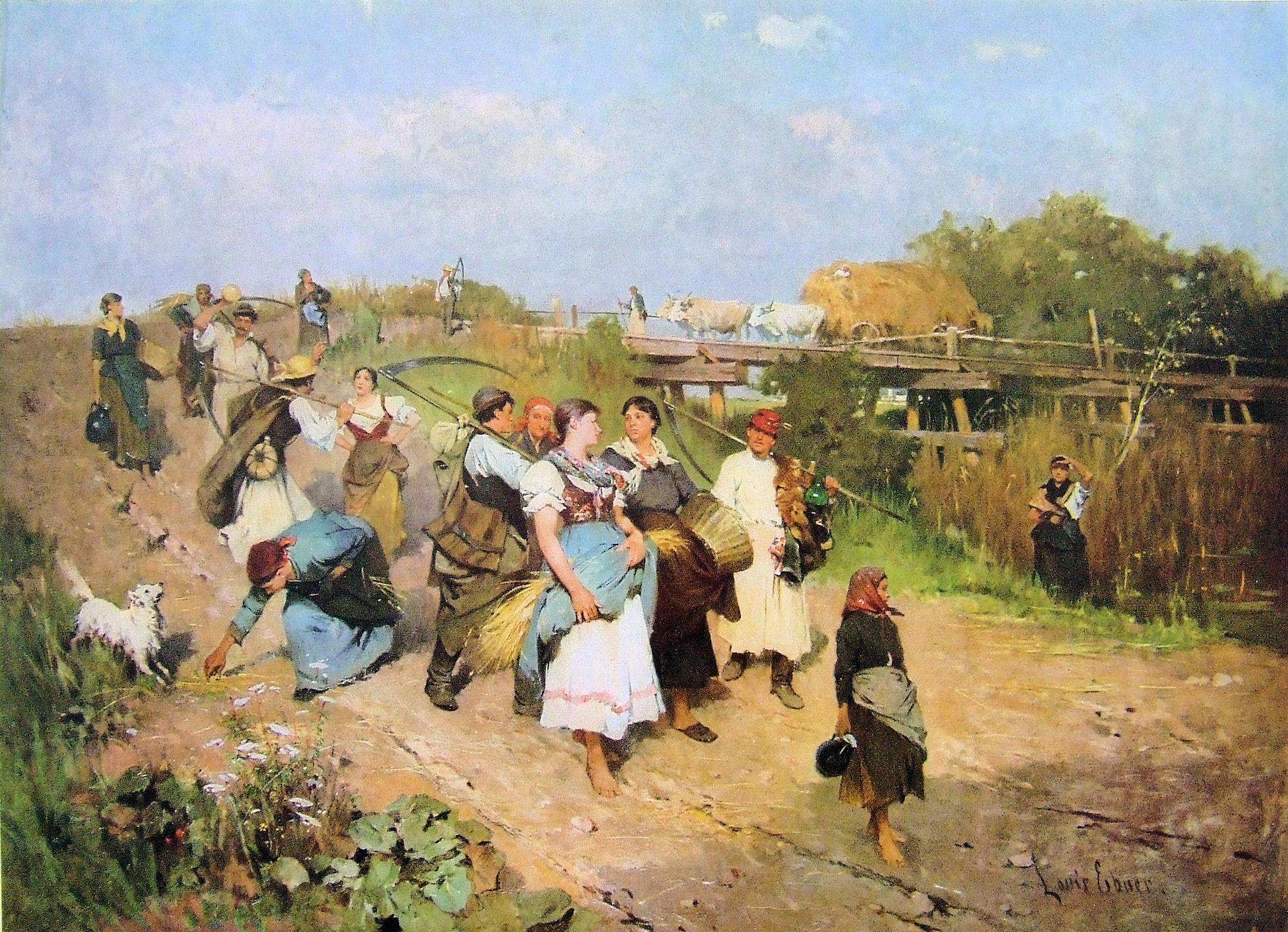
Harvesters Returning Home (1881)

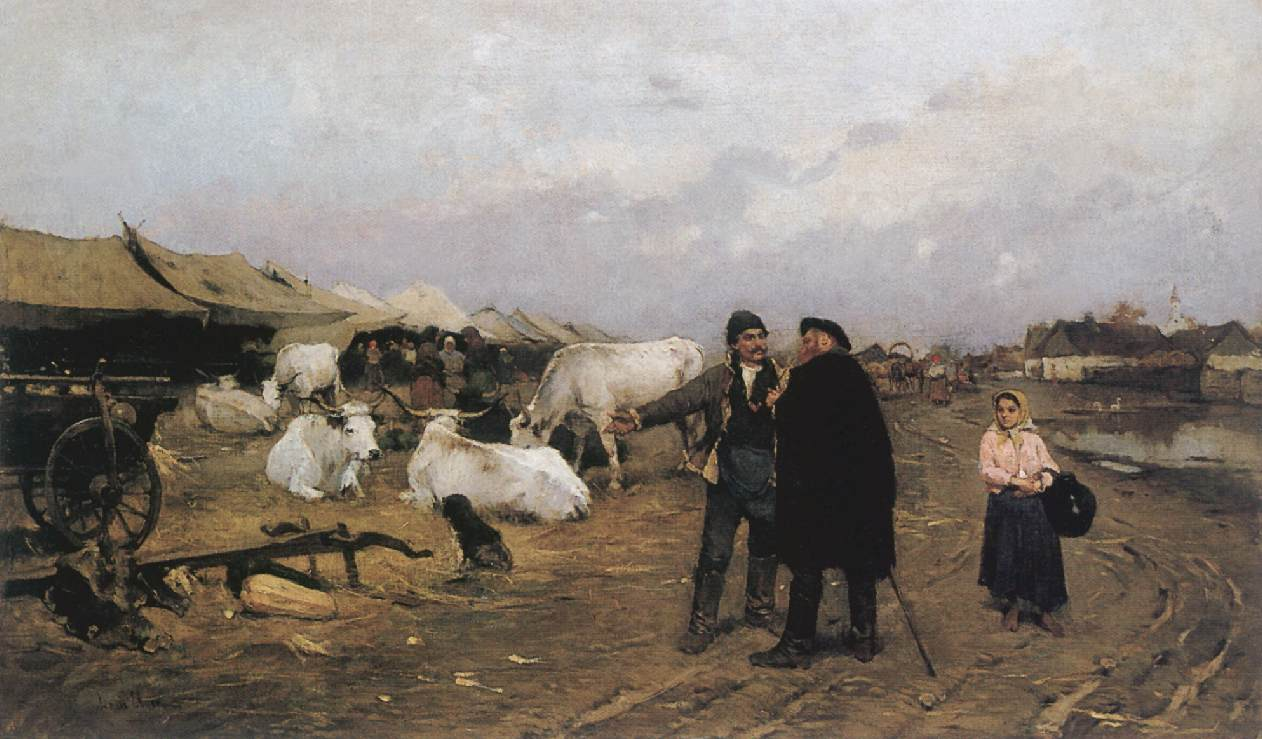
Market Scene (1880s)

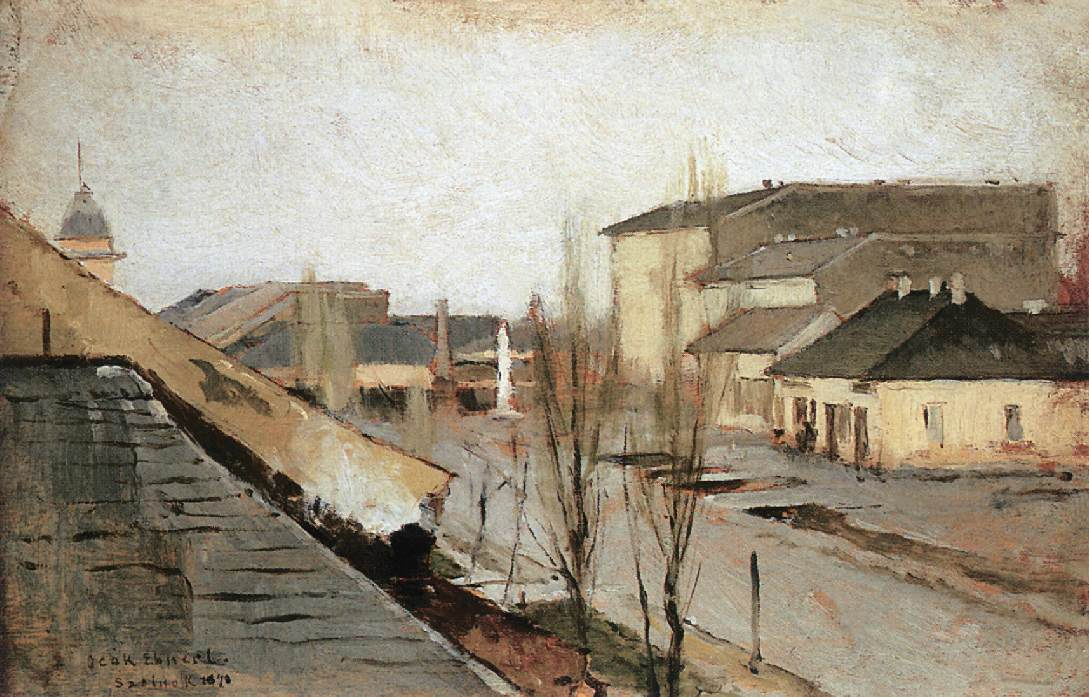
Main Square of Szolnok in the Rain (1878)

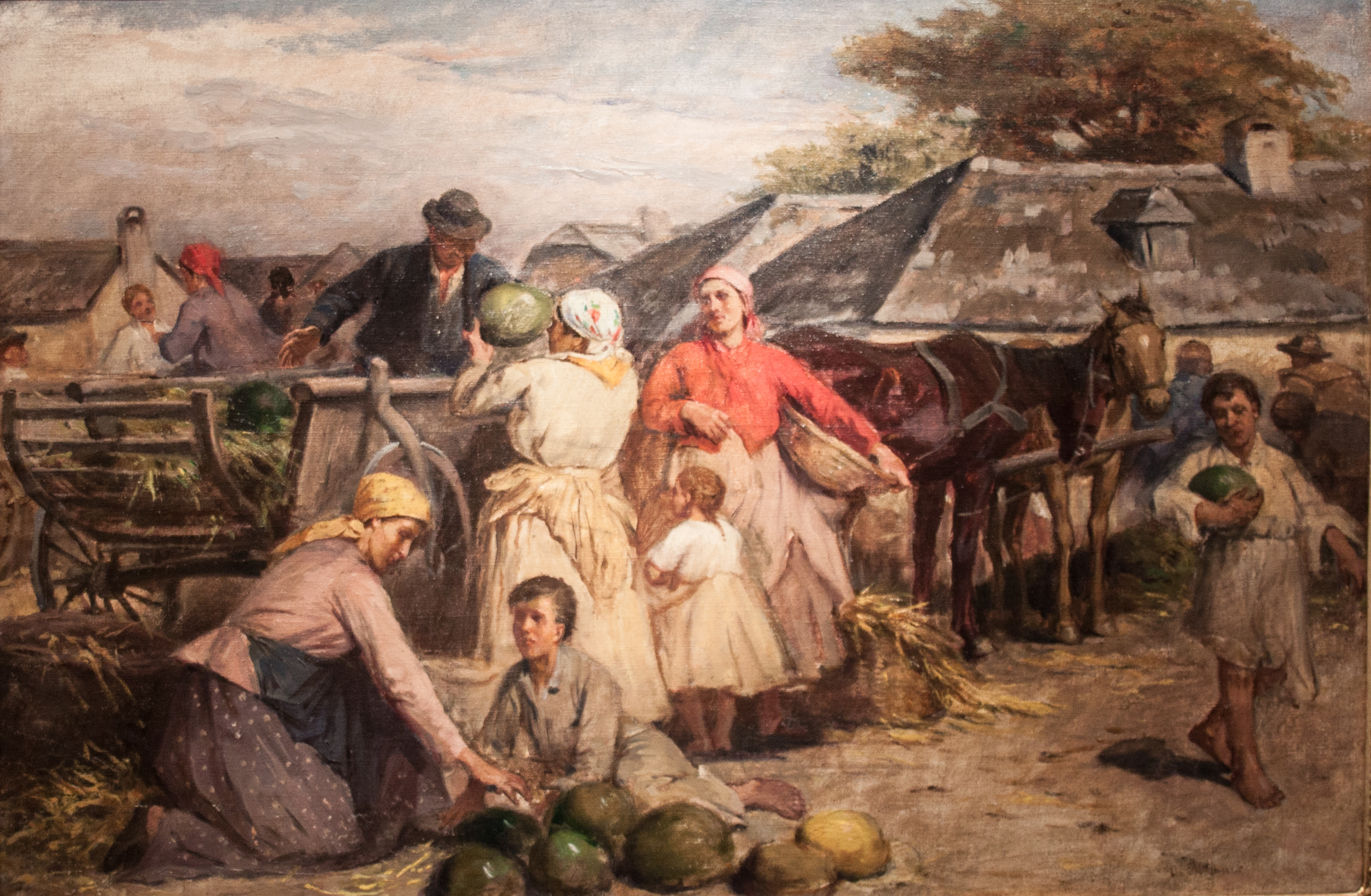
Melon Market (date unknown)
