= Thumb rest =

Device for maintaining the playing position of a wind instrument

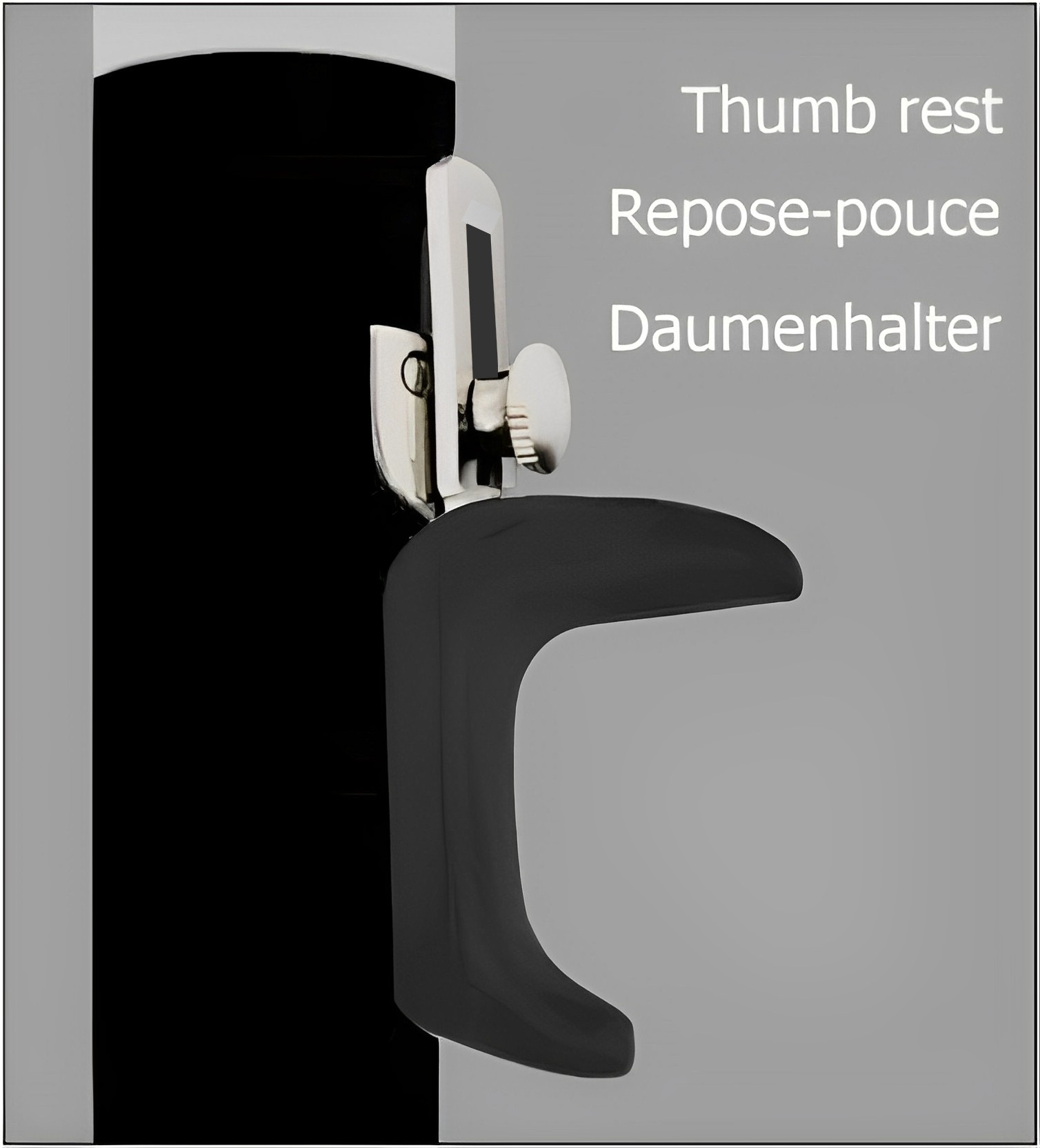
Adjustable thumb rest with rubber pad

A thumb rest is a device that helps players of certain woodwind instruments keep their thumbs in the correct position and thus facilitate playing (embouchure, posture, fingerings). Thumb rests are mainly found on clarinets, oboes, saxophones and flutes.

== History ==
Historically, woodwind instruments were first made from boxwood and fruitwood; they were relatively compact and light, and they did not have thumb rests. The need arose from about 1830 with the increase in the number of keys in wind instruments and the switch to exotic woods, especially grenadilla from Mozambique, which made the instruments heavier.

Around 1860, the co-inventor of the Boehm clarinet, Hyacinthe Klosé, made the thumb rest generally accepted in France by means of his méthode complète de clarinette, after he too had switched to making his clarinets from grenadilla.

The thumb rest was either carved from solid wood or screwed onto the body of the instrument as a metal part. The clarinetist and clarinet maker Iwan Müller is sometimes identified as the inventor of the thumb rest. Others claim that it was developed independently by various woodwind instrument makers. Before the development of the thumb rest, many clarinetists put the mouthpiece on the clarinet in such a way that the reed was on top (over-blowing instead of the under-blowing with the reed on the lower lip that is common today), because they could hold the instrument better that way.

The saxophone has had a thumb rest since its creation in 1849. The Selmer Mark VI saxophone model from Henri Selmer Paris, which revolutionised the ergonomics of this instrument when it was introduced in 1954, had an adjustable thumb rest made of plastic or metal.

The side of the thumb rest that comes into contact with the finger is usually fitted with a glued-on cork or rubber pad to protect the finger. Some musicians develop calluses in this contact area. Some thumb rests have a device that allows the use of a strap to relieve the thumb.

== Support on the bassoon ==
Instead of a thumb rest, bassoonists use a hand rest on the German bassoon (Heckel system). The French bassoon does without one.

== Thumb rests and musculoskeletal disorders ==
To counter musculoskeletal disorders (chronic pains), there are now ergonomic thumb rests that distribute the weight of the instrument over the whole thumb and/or the thumb and wrist. Some of these supports can also be combined with a strap.

== Gallery ==
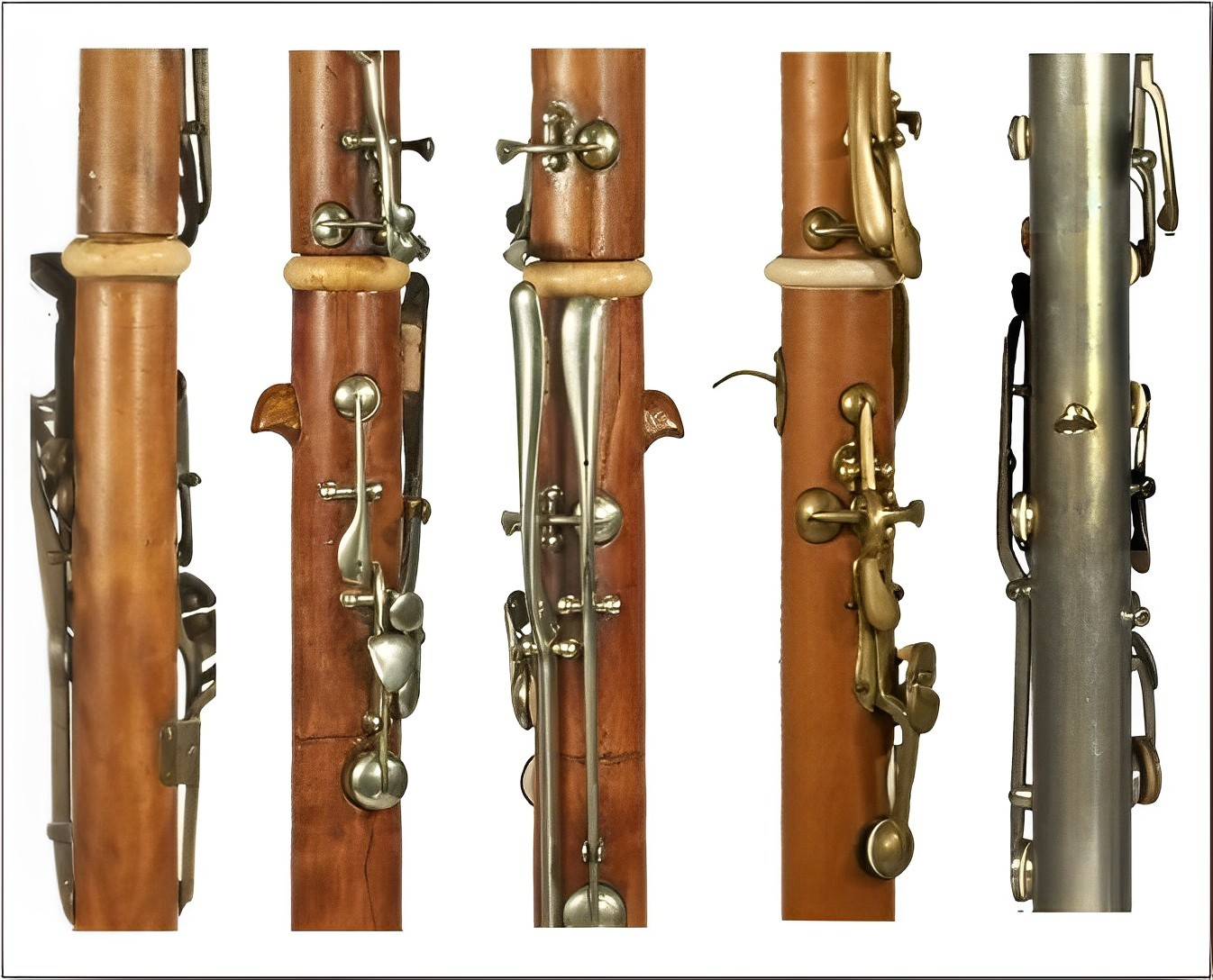
Different models of thumb rest on historical clarinets (from left): without rest, wooden rest, metal rests

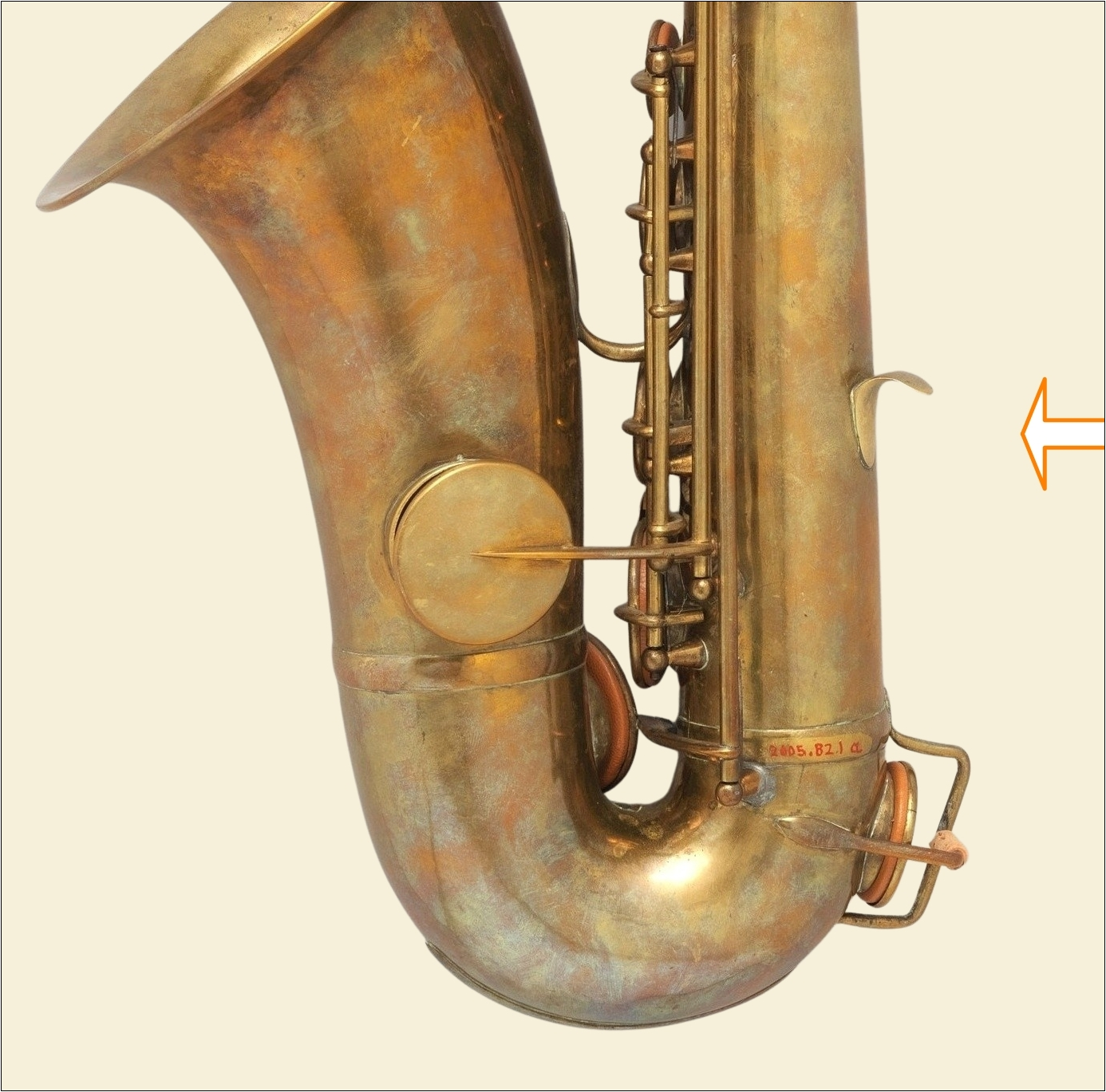
Alto saxophone by Adolphe Sax with thumb rest (1855)

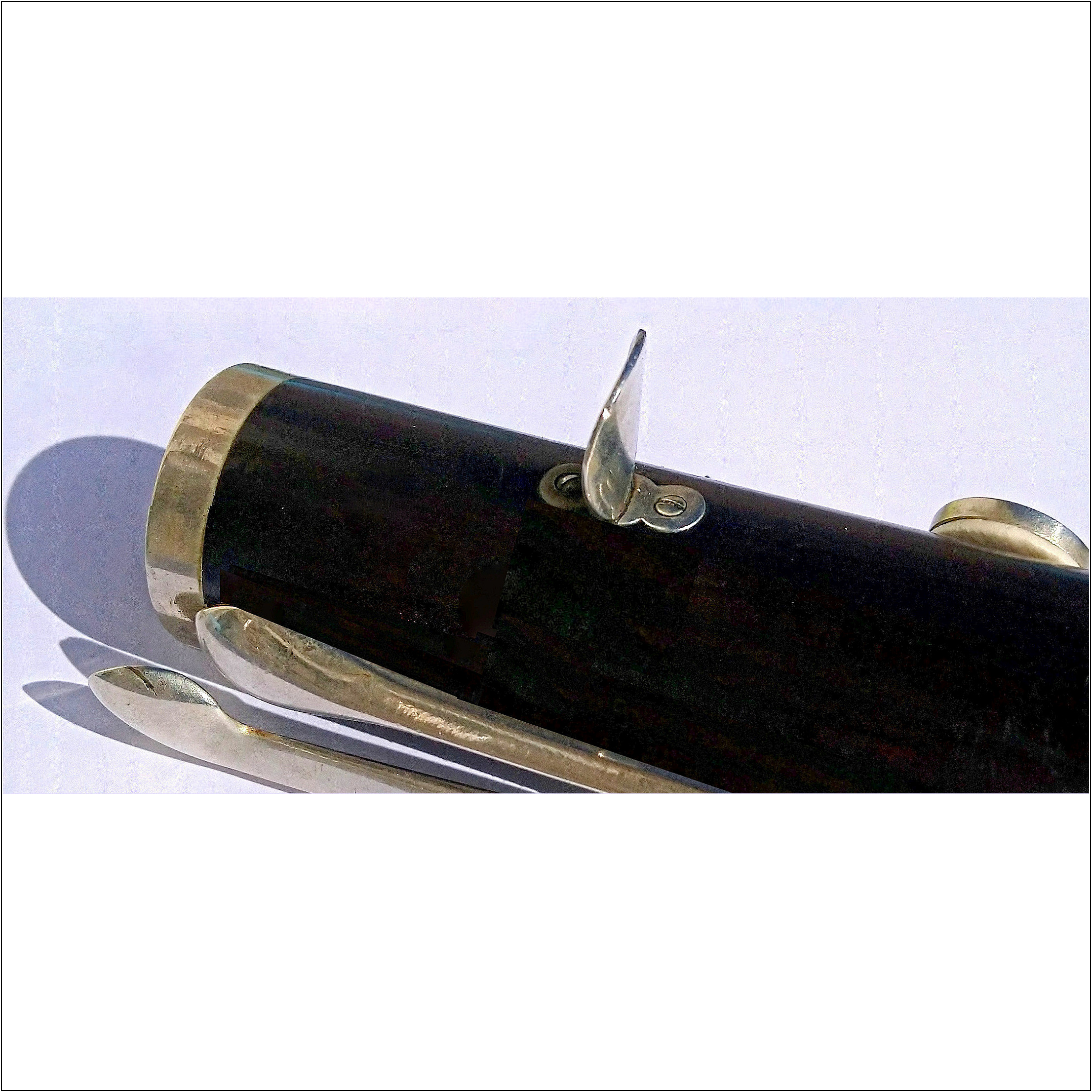
Screwed thumb rest made of nickel silver of an Albert system clarinet (ca. 1900)

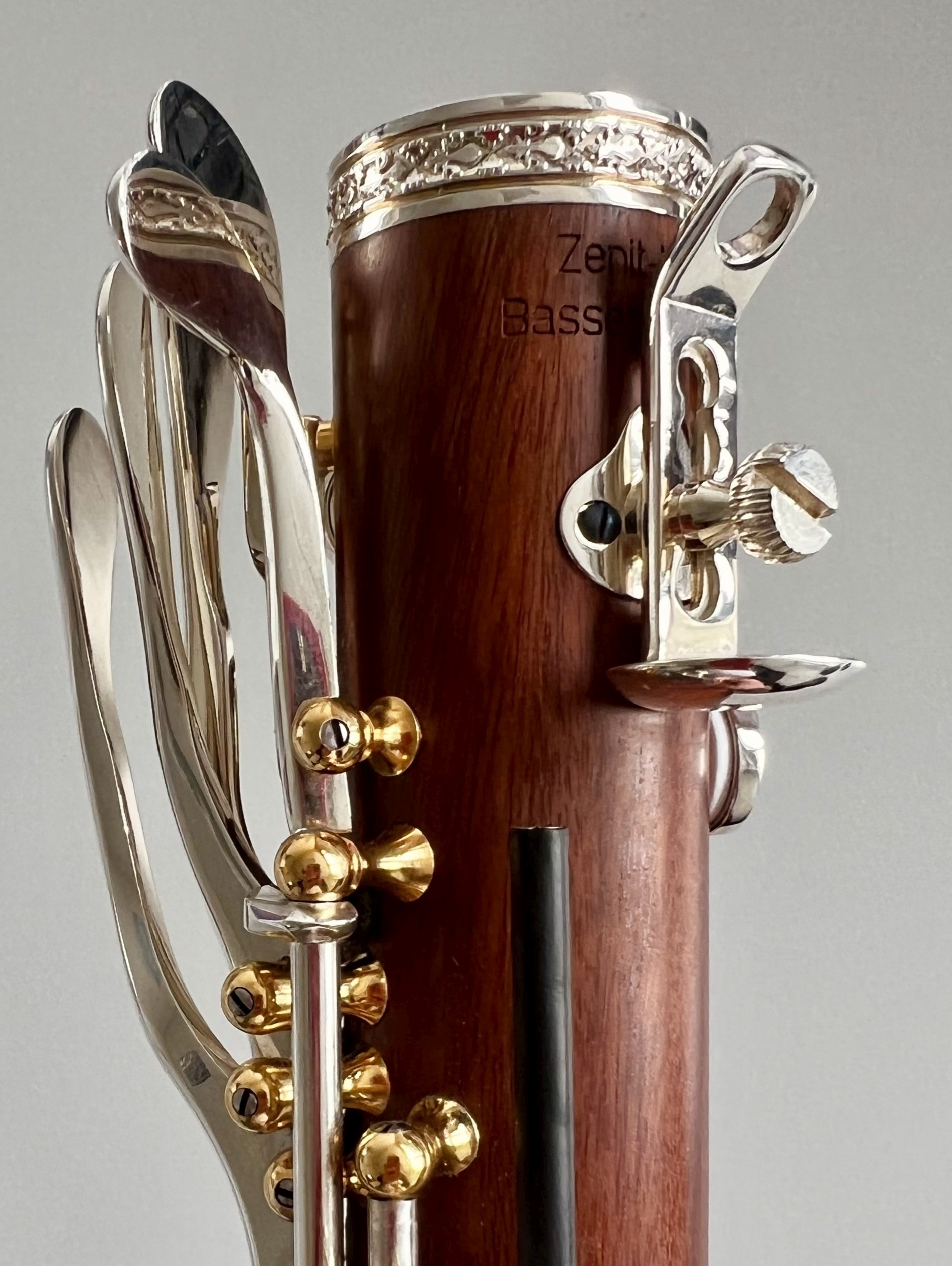
Adjustable support on a basset clarinet

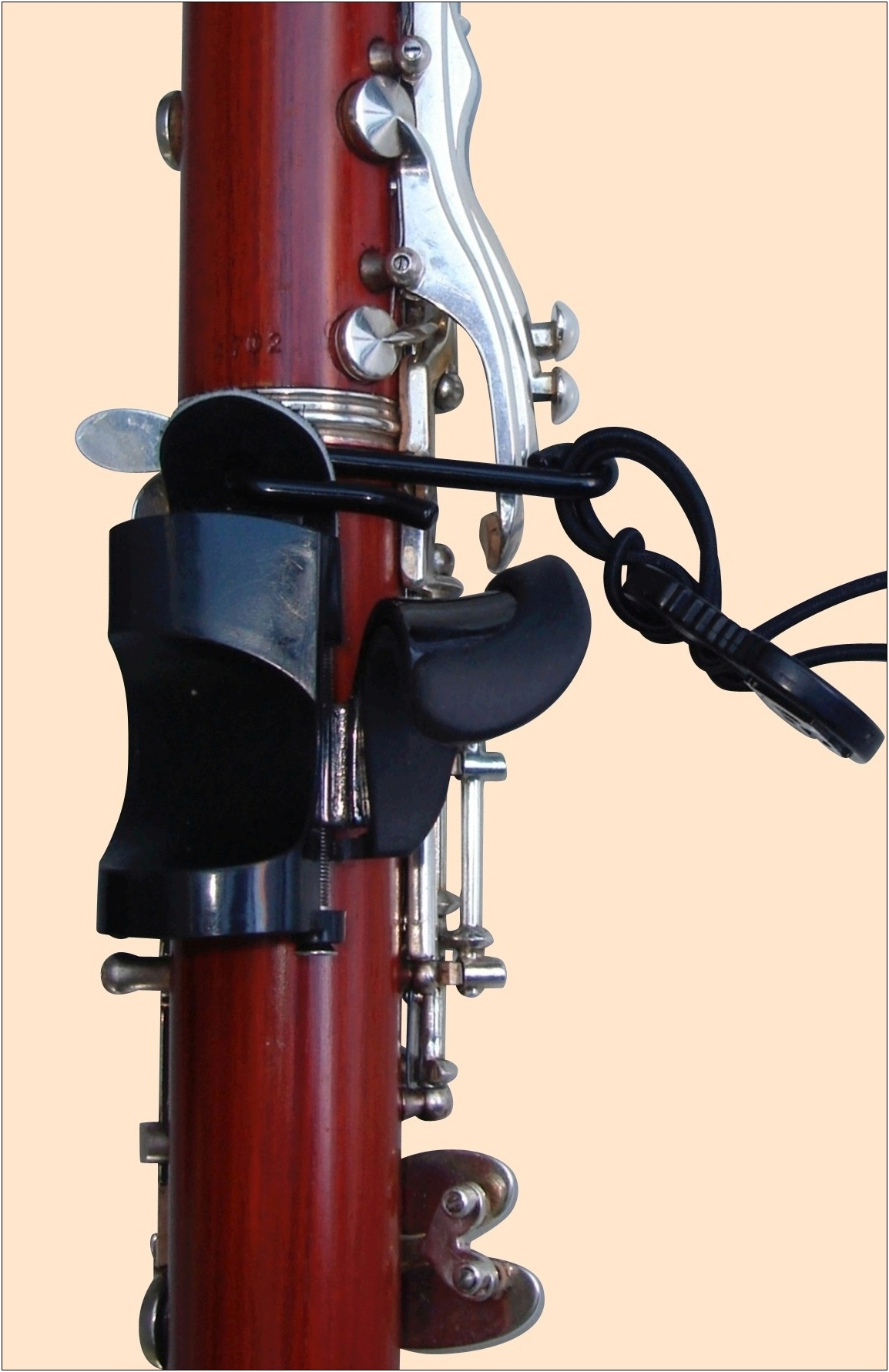
Ergonomic thumb rest Étude by Ton Kooiman, with perforated leather stripe for carrying strap

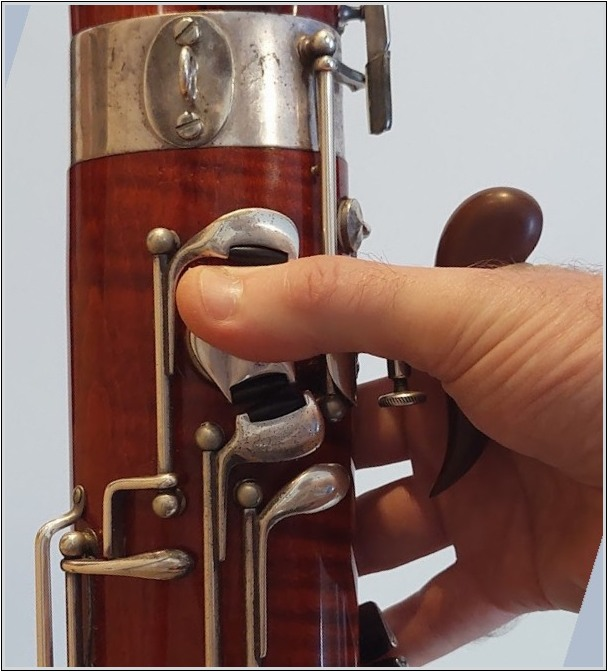
Bassoon (Heckel system) showing right hand on handrest in playing position

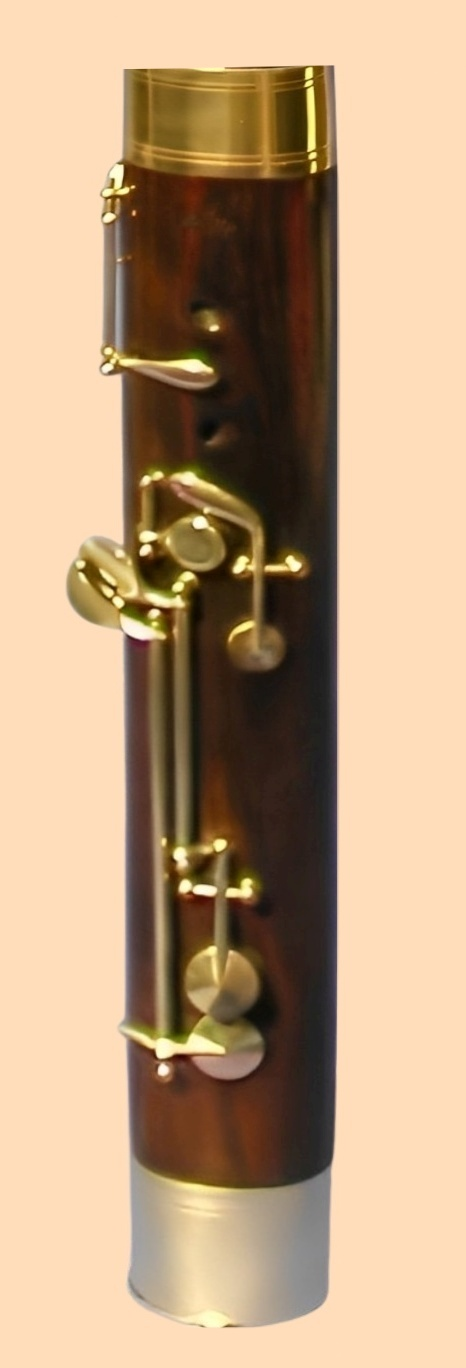
French bassoon without handrest
