= Boehm system =

System of keywork for the flute

The Boehm system is a system of keywork for the flute, created by inventor and flautist Theobald Boehm between 1831 and 1847. A similar system was later adopted by the clarinet family.

== History ==
Immediately prior to the development of the Boehm system, flutes were most commonly made of wood, with an inverse conical bore, eight keys, and tone holes (the openings where the fingers are placed to produce specific notes) that were small in size, and thus easily covered by the fingertips. Boehm's work was inspired by an 1831 concert in London, given by soloist Charles Nicholson, who, with his father in the 1820s, had introduced a flute constructed with larger tone holes than were used in previous designs. This large-holed instrument could produce greater volume of sound than other flutes, and Boehm set out to produce his own large-holed design.

In addition to large holes, Boehm provided his flute with "full venting", meaning that all keys were normally open (previously, several keys were normally closed, and opened only when the key was operated). Boehm also wanted to locate tone holes at acoustically optimal points on the body of the instrument, rather than locations conveniently covered by the player's fingers. To achieve these goals, Boehm adapted a system of axle-mounted keys with a series of "open rings" (called brille, German for "eyeglasses", as they resembled the type of eyeglass frames common during the 19th century) that were fitted around other tone holes, such that the closure of one tone hole by a finger would also close a key placed over a second hole.

In 1832 Boehm introduced a new conical-bore flute, which achieved a fair degree of success. Boehm, however, continued to look for ways to improve the instrument. Finding that an increased volume of air produced a stronger and clearer tone, he replaced the conical bore with a cylindrical bore, finding that a parabolic contraction of the bore near the embouchure hole improved the instrument's low register. He also found that optimal tone was produced when the tone holes were too large to be covered by the fingertips, and he developed a system of finger plates to cover the holes. These new flutes were at first made of silver, although Boehm later produced wooden versions.

The cylindrical Boehm flute was introduced in 1847, with the instrument gradually being adopted almost universally by professional and amateur players in Europe and around the world during the second half of the 19th century. The instrument was adopted for the performance of orchestral and chamber music, opera and theater, wind ensembles (e.g., military and civic bands), and most other music which might be loosely described as relating to "Western classical music" (including, for example, jazz). Many further refinements have been made, and countless design variations are common among flutes today (the "offset G" key, addition of the low B foot, etc.) The concepts of the Boehm system have been applied across the range of flutes available, including piccolos, alto flutes, bass flutes, and so on, as well as other wind instruments. The material of the instrument may vary (many piccolos are made of wood, some very large flutes are wooden or even made of PVC).

The flute is perhaps the oldest musical instrument, other than the human voice itself. There are very many flutes, both traversely blown and end-blown "fipple" flutes, currently produced which are not built on the Boehm model.

The fingering system for the saxophone closely resembles the Boehm system. A key system inspired by Boehm's for the clarinet family is also known as the "Boehm system", although it was developed by Hyacinthe Klosé and not Boehm himself. The Boehm system was also adapted for a small number of flageolets. Boehm did work on a system for the bassoon, and Boehm-inspired oboes have been made, but non-Boehm systems remain predominant for these instruments. The Albert system is another key system for the clarinet.
