= Rosario Mazzeo =

American musician

Rosario Mazzeo (April 5, 1911 – July 19, 1997) was an American clarinetist and clarinet system designer. He was born in Pawtucket, Rhode Island, grew up in Worcester, Massachusetts, and afterward lived in Boston, Massachusetts. He played first E-flat clarinet and later bass clarinet in the Boston Symphony Orchestra from 1933 to 1966.

Personnel manager with the Boston Symphony for much of his performance tenure, Rosario Mazzeo was also chairman of the woodwind department at the New England Conservatory of Music.

After his retirement from the BSO, he lived in Carmel, California, where he had an extensive private studio and was a faculty member at the University of California, San Francisco Conservatory of Music and Stanford University. He was the designer of the Mazzeo system of clarinet keywork.
