= Clarinet =

Single-reed woodwind instrument

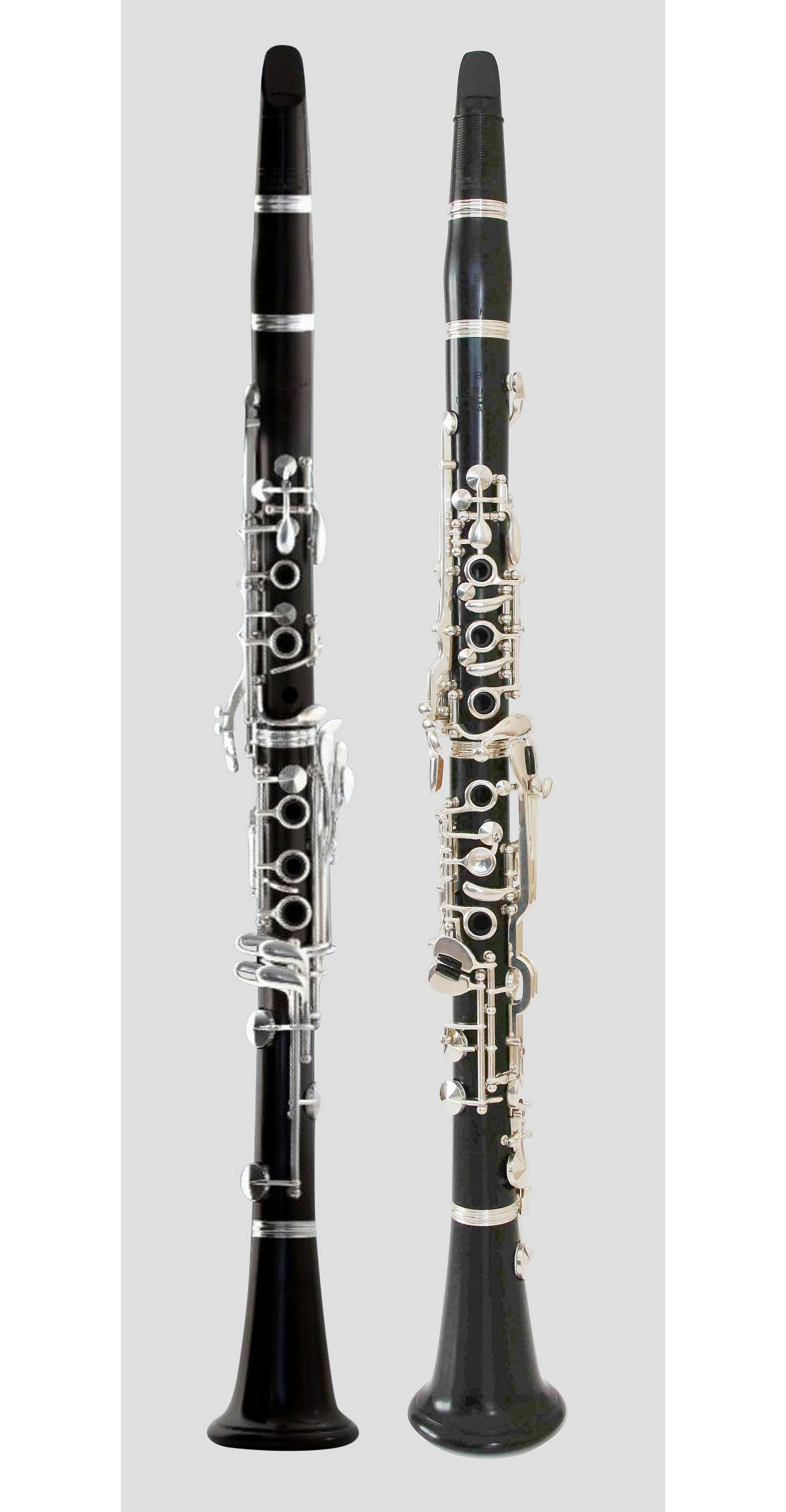
- B♭ clarinets (Boehm and Oehler fingering system)

Woodwind instrument
- Classification: Single-reed
- Hornbostel–Sachs classification: 422.211.2–71 (Single-reeded aerophone with keys)

Playing range
- All clarinets have approximately the same written range. The sounding pitch depends on what key the instrument is in. Low clarinets generally have extra keys to extend the range downward.

Related instruments
- Chalumeau; Tárogató; Heckelphone-clarinet

The clarinet is a single-reed musical instrument in the woodwind family, with a nearly cylindrical bore and a flared bell.

Clarinets comprise a family of instruments of differing sizes and pitches. The clarinet family is the largest woodwind family, ranging from the BB♭ contrabass to the A♭ piccolo. The B♭ soprano clarinet is the most common type, and is the instrument usually indicated by the word "clarinet".

German instrument maker Johann Christoph Denner is generally credited with inventing the clarinet sometime around 1700 by adding a register key to the chalumeau, an earlier single-reed instrument. Over time, additional keywork and airtight pads were added to improve the tone and playability. Today the clarinet is a standard fixture of the orchestra and concert band and is used in classical music, military bands, klezmer, jazz, and other styles.

== Etymology ==
The word "clarinet" may have entered the English language via the French clarinette (the feminine diminutive of Old French clarin), or from Provençal clarin 'oboe', originating from the Latin root clarus 'clear'. The word is related to Middle English clarion, a type of trumpet, the name of which derives from the same root.

The earliest mention of the word "clarinette" being used for the instrument dates to a 1710 order placed by the Duke of Gronsfeld for two instruments made by Jacob Denner. The English form "clarinet" is found as early as 1733, and the now-archaic "clarionet" appears from 1784 until the early 20th century.

A person who plays the clarinet is called a clarinetist (in North American English), a clarinettist (in British English), or simply a clarinet player.

== Development ==
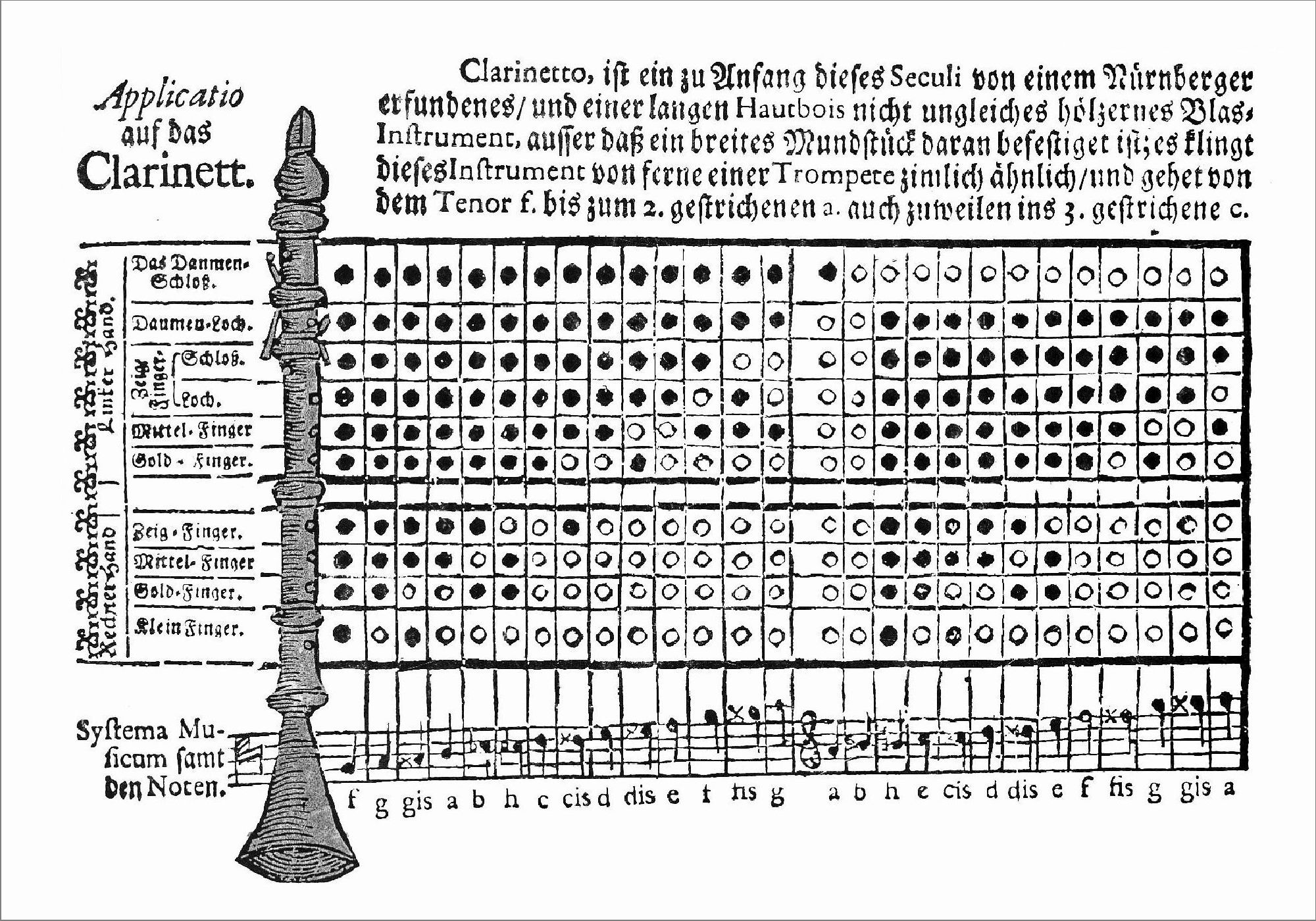
Two-key clarinet with fingering chart, from Museum musicum theoreticalo practicum, 1732

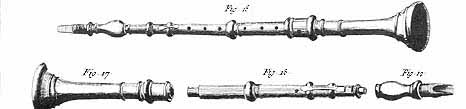
Denner clarinet

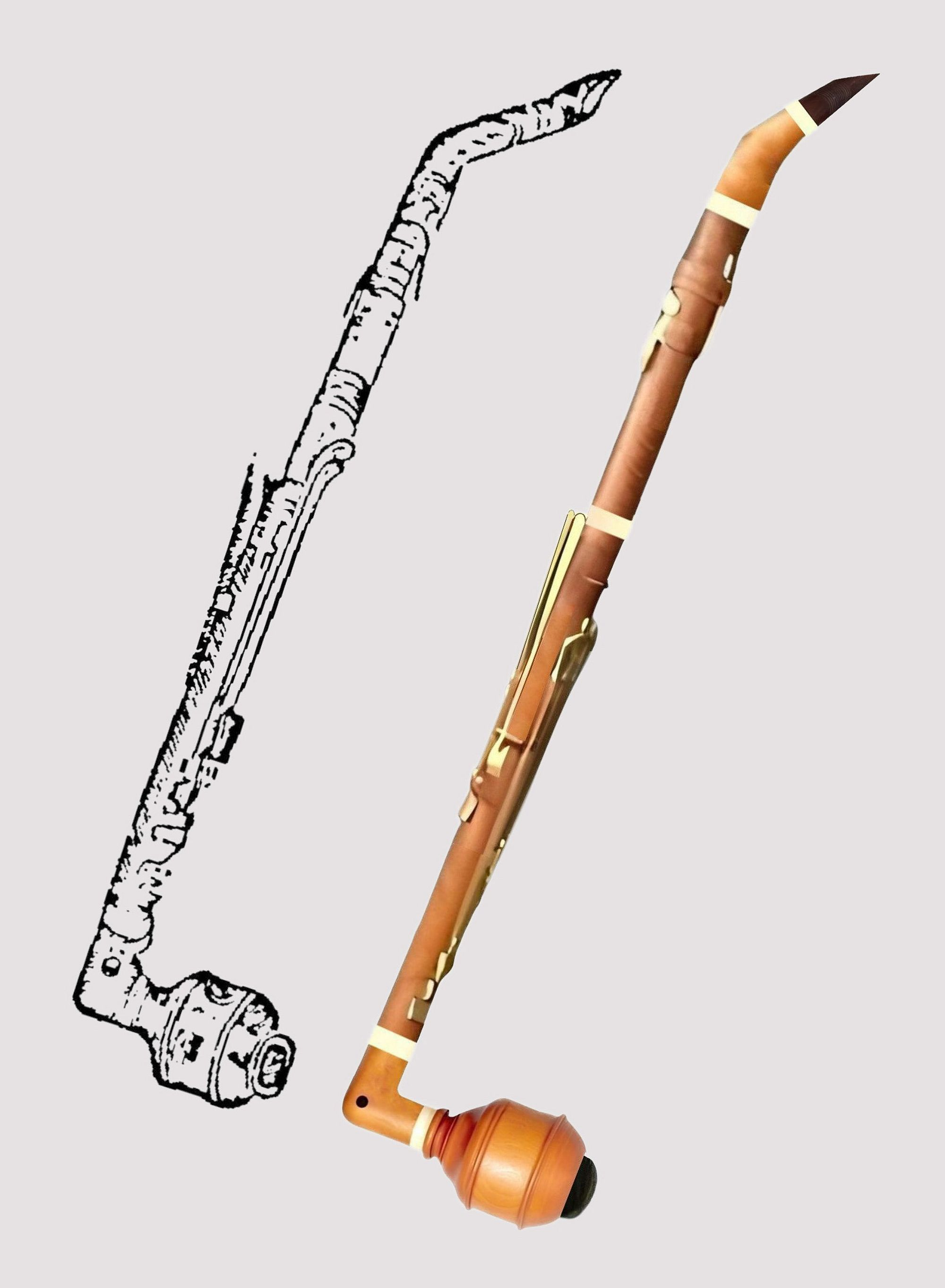
Sketch of the basset clarinet used by Anton Stadler since 1789 and a replica

The modern clarinet developed from a Baroque instrument called the chalumeau. This instrument was similar to a recorder, but with a single-reed mouthpiece and a cylindrical bore. Lacking a register key, it was played mainly in its fundamental register, with a limited range of about one and a half octaves. It had eight finger holes, like a recorder, and a written pitch range from F_{3} to G_{4}. At this time, contrary to modern practice, the reed was placed in contact with the upper lip. Around the beginning of the 18th century the German instrument maker Johann Christoph Denner (or possibly his son Jacob Denner) equipped a chalumeau in the alto register with two keys, one of which enabled access to a higher register. This second register did not begin an octave above the first, as with other woodwind instruments, but started an octave and a perfect fifth higher than the first. A second key, at the top, extended the range of the first register to A_{4} and, together with the register key, to B♭_{4}. Later, Denner lengthened the bell and provided it with a third key to extend the pitch range down to E_{3}.

After Denner's innovations, other makers added keys to improve tuning and facilitate fingerings and the chalumeau fell into disuse. The clarinet of the Classical period, as used by Mozart, typically had five keys. Mozart suggested extending the clarinet downwards by four semitones to C_{3}, which resulted in the basset clarinet that was about 18 centimetres (7.1 in) longer, made first by Theodor Lotz. In 1791 Mozart composed the Concerto for Clarinet and Orchestra in A major for this instrument, with passages ranging down to C_{3}. By the time of Beethoven (c. 1780–1820), the clarinet was a fixed member in the orchestra.

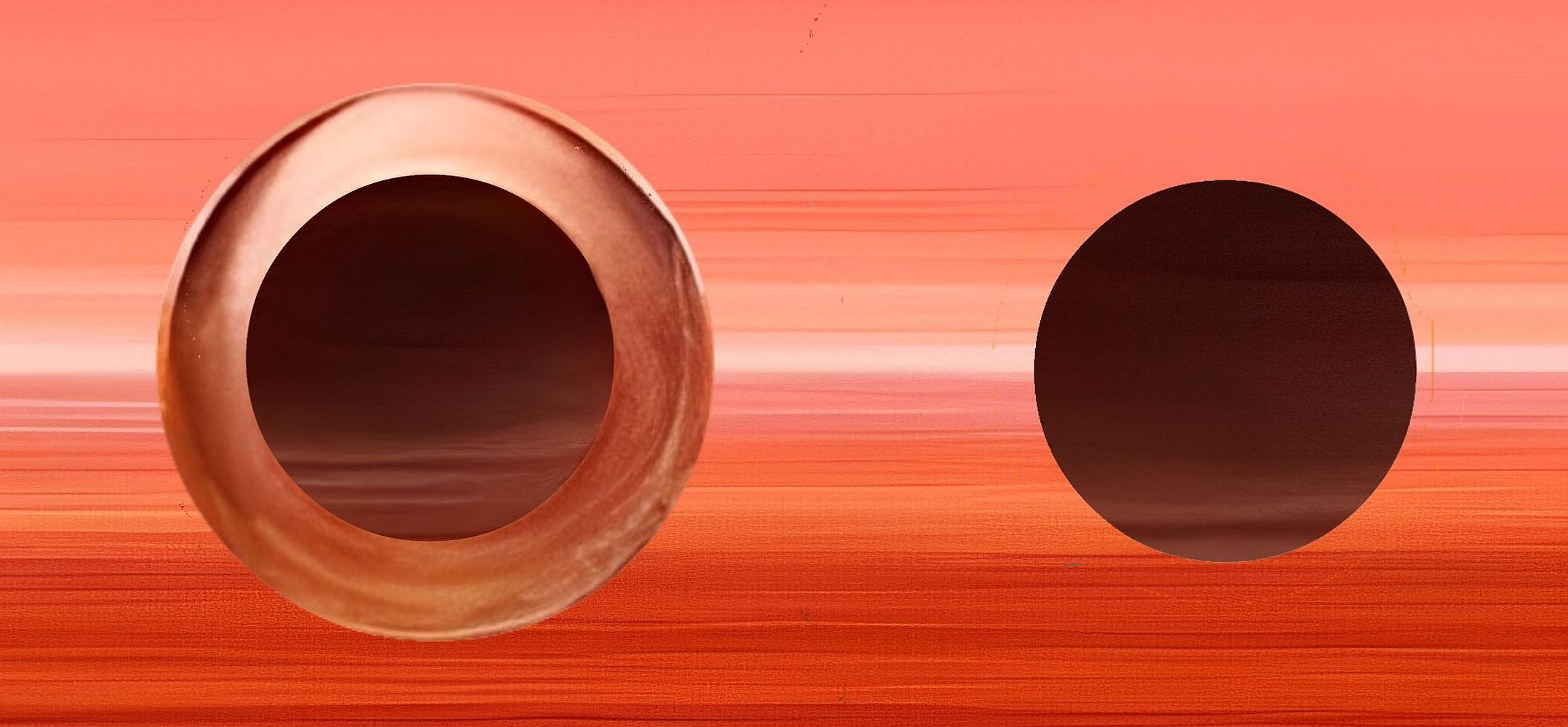
Tone holes - countersunk and straight

The number of keys was limited because their felt pads did not seal tightly. Iwan Müller invented the stuffed pad, originally made of kid leather. These in combination with countersunk tone holes sealed the keyholes sufficiently to permit the use of an increased number of keys. In 1812 Müller presented a clarinet with seven finger holes and thirteen keys, which he called "clarinet omnitonic" since it was capable of playing in all keys. It was no longer necessary to use differently tuned clarinets for different keys. Müller is also considered the inventor of the metal ligature and the thumb rest. During this period the typical embouchure also changed, orienting the mouthpiece with the reed facing downward. This was first recommended in 1782 and became standard by the 1830s.

In the late 1830s, German flute maker Theobald Böhm invented a ring and axle key system for the flute. This key system was first used on the clarinet between 1839 and 1843 by French clarinetist Hyacinthe Klosé in collaboration with instrument maker Louis Auguste Buffet. Their design introduced needle springs for the axles, and the ring keys simplified some complicated fingering patterns. The inventors called this the Boehm clarinet, although Böhm was not involved in its development and the system differed from the one used on the flute. Other key systems have been developed, many built around modifications to the basic Boehm system, including the Full Boehm, Mazzeo, McIntyre, the Benade NX, and the Reform Boehm system, which combined Boehm-system keywork with a German mouthpiece and bore.

The Albert clarinet was developed by Eugène Albert in 1848. This model was based on the Müller clarinet with some changes to keywork, and was also known as the "simple system". It included a "spectacle key" patented by Adolphe Sax and rollers to improve little-finger movement. After 1861, a "patent C sharp" key developed by Joseph Tyler was added to other clarinet models. Improved versions of Albert clarinets were built in Belgium and France for export to the UK and the US.

Around 1860, clarinettist Carl Baermann and instrument maker Georg Ottensteiner developed the patented Baermann/Ottensteiner clarinet. This instrument had new connecting levers, allowing multiple fingering options to operate some of the pads. In the early 20th century, the German clarinetist and clarinet maker Oskar Oehler presented a clarinet using similar fingerings to the Baermann instrument, with significantly more toneholes than the Böhm model. The new clarinet was called the Oehler system clarinet or German clarinet, while the Böhm clarinet has since been called the French clarinet. The French clarinet differs from the German not only in fingering but also in sound. Richard Strauss noted that "French clarinets have a flat, nasal tone, while German ones approximate the singing voice". Among modern instruments the difference is smaller, although intonation differences persist. The use of Oehler clarinets has continued in German and Austrian orchestras.

Today the Boehm system is standard everywhere except in Germany and Austria, where the Oehler clarinet is still used. Some contemporary Dixieland players continue to use Albert system clarinets. The Reform Boehm system is also popular in the Netherlands.

Clarinets with different arrangements of keys and holes

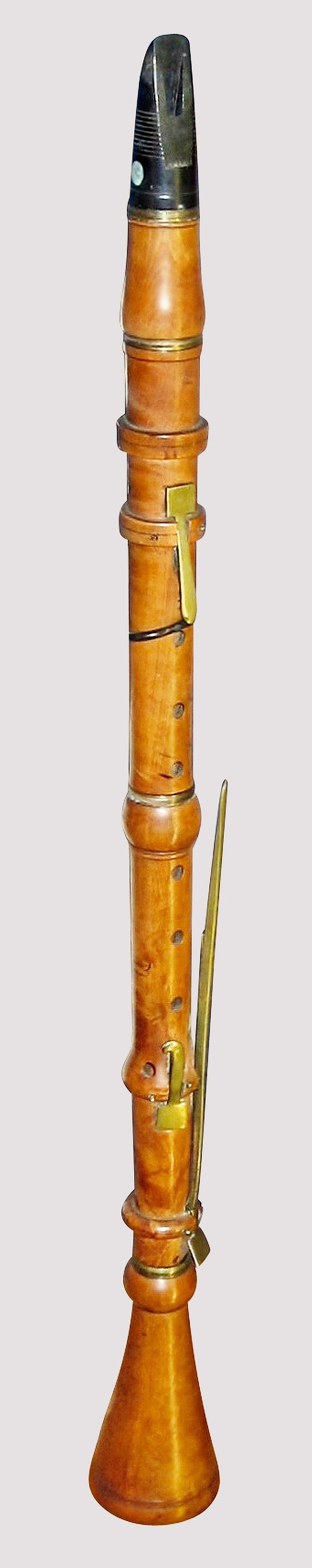
Early Clarinet with 4 keys (c. 1760)

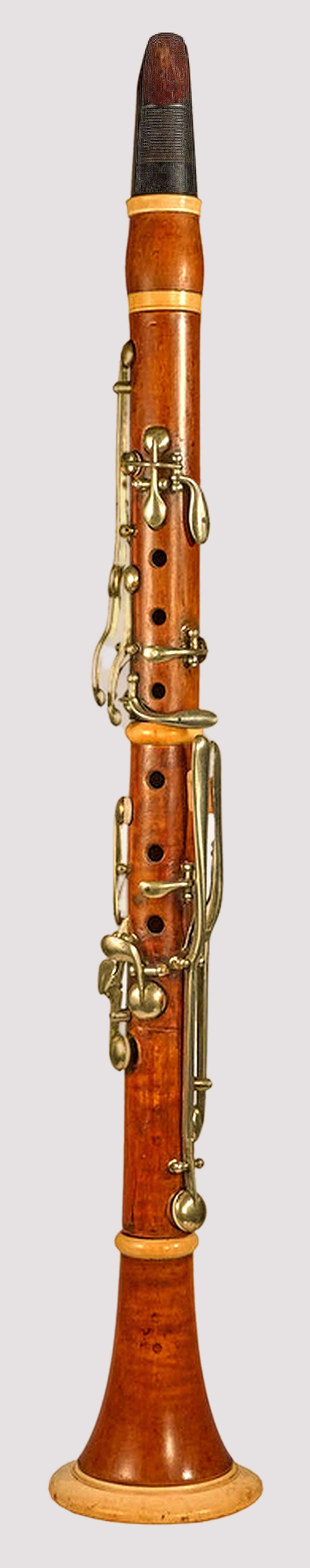
Iwan Müller clarinet with 13 keys and leather pads, developed in 1809

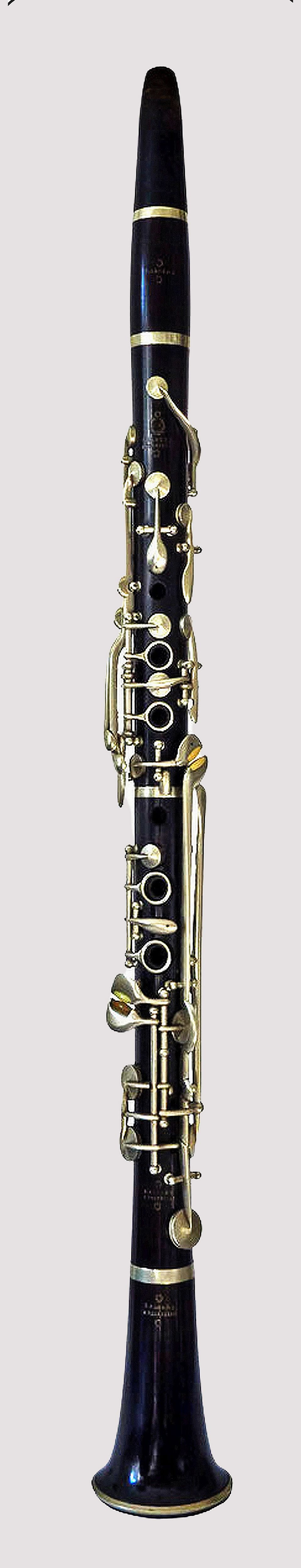
Albert clarinet designed c. 1850 by Eugène Albert, intermediate between the Müller and Oehler clarinets

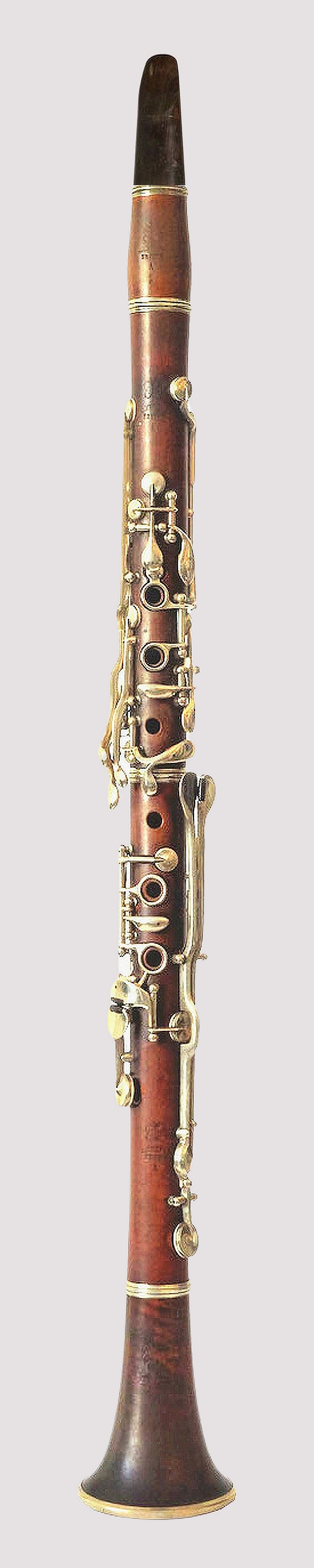
Baermann clarinet, c. 1870, intermediate between the Müller and Oehler clarinets

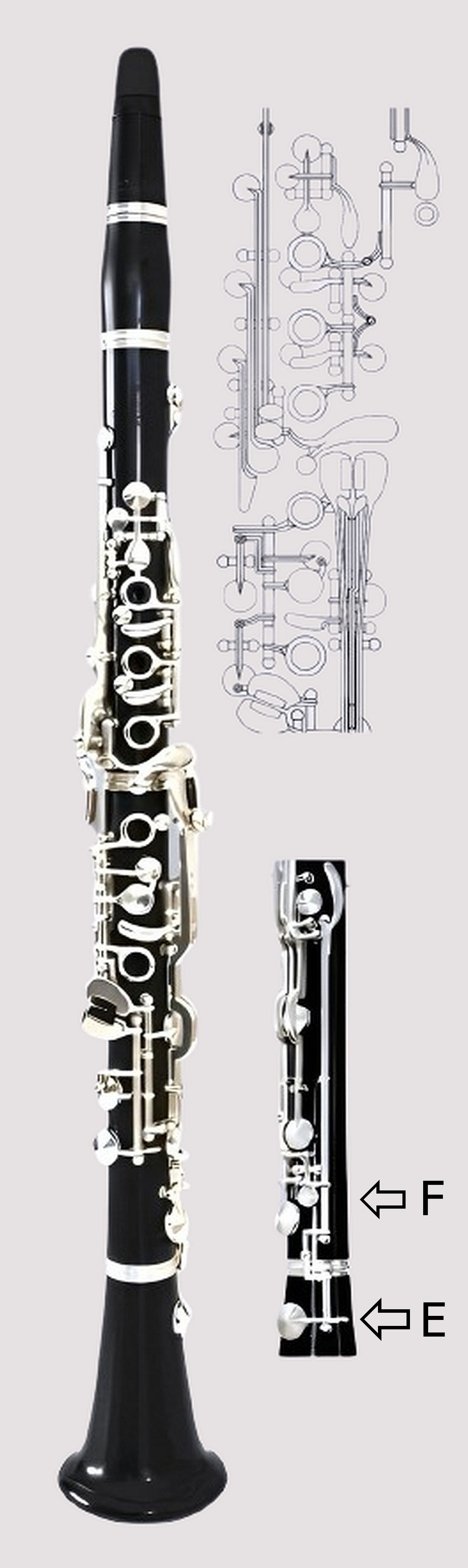
Oehler clarinet with a cover on the middle tone hole of the lower joint, dev. 1905 by Oscar Oehler, and with bell mechanism added later to improve the low E and F

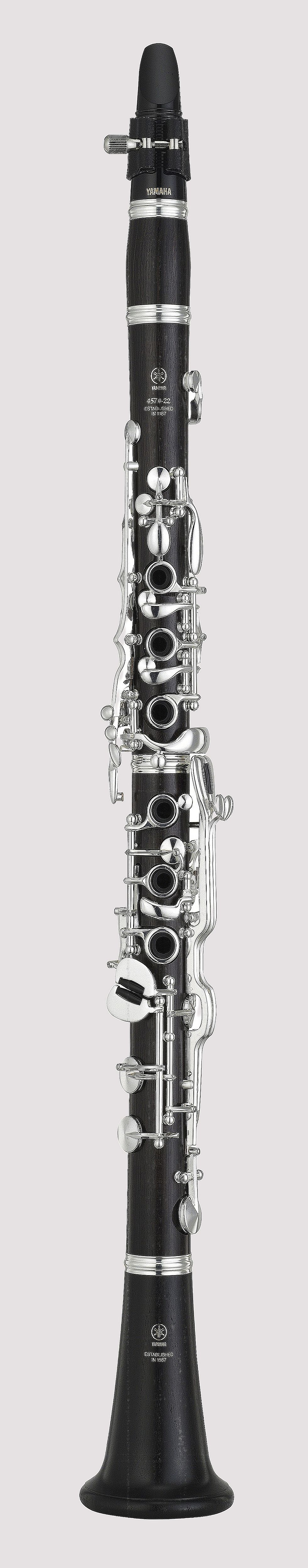
Standard German clarinet without cover or bell mechanism

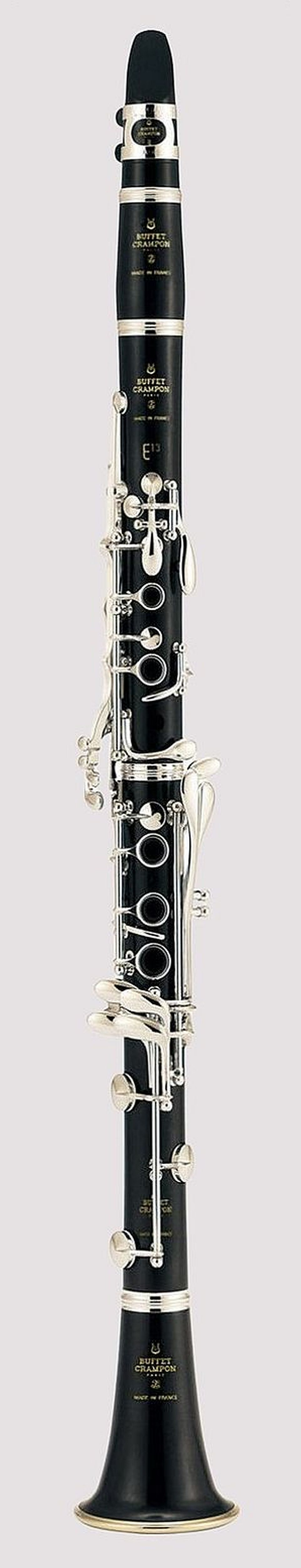
French Clarinet (Original Boehm with 17 keys and 6 rings). Developed c. 1843 by Hyacinthe Klosé and Louis Auguste Buffet

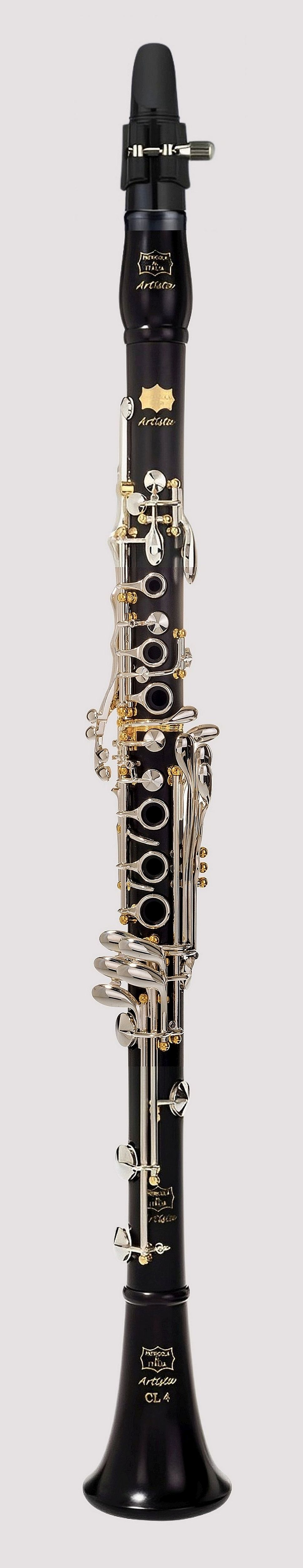
Full Boehm clarinet with 21 keys and 7 rings developed c. 1870

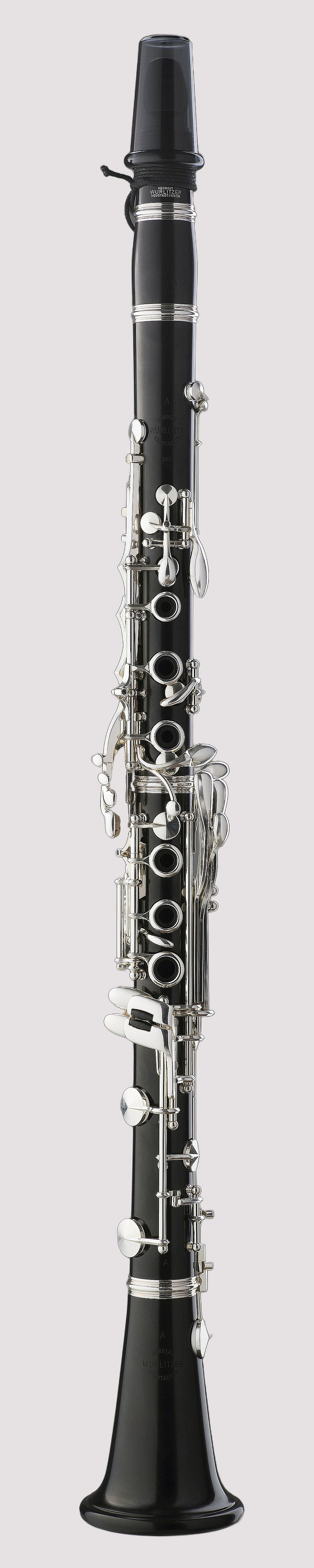
Reform Boehm clarinet with 19 keys and 7 rings, developed c. 1949 by Fritz Wurlitzer

== Acoustics ==
The clarinet's cylindrical bore is the main reason for its distinctive timbre, which varies between the three main registers (the chalumeau, clarion, and altissimo). The A and B♭ clarinets have nearly the same bore and nearly identical tonal quality, although the A typically has a slightly warmer sound. The tone of the E♭ clarinet is brighter and can be heard through loud orchestral textures. The bass clarinet has a characteristically deep, mellow sound, and the alto clarinet sounds similar to the bass, though not as dark.

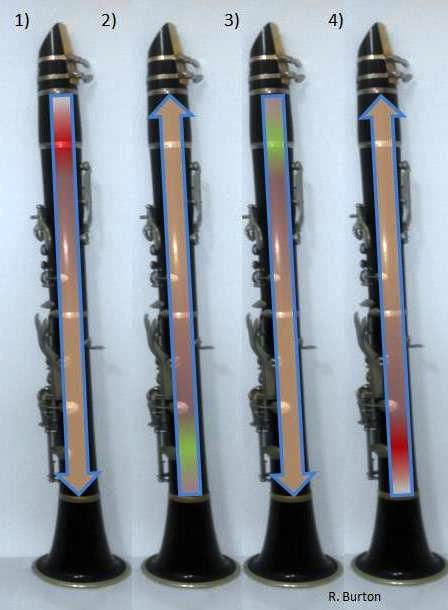
Sound wave propagation in the soprano clarinet

The production of sound by a clarinet follows these steps:

1. The mouthpiece and reed are surrounded by the player's lips, which put light, even pressure on the reed and form an airtight seal. Air is blown past the reed and down the instrument. The air rushing past the reed causes it to vibrate, in the same way wind causes a flag to flap. As air pressure increases, the reed bends farther until it hits the mouthpiece.
  The reed stays pressed against the mouthpiece until either the springiness of the reed forces it to open or a returning pressure wave hits the reed and opens it. When the reed opens, a puff of air goes through the gap and the reed swings shut again. When played loudly, the reed can spend up to 50% of the time shut. The 'puff of air' or compression wave (at around 3% greater pressure than the surrounding air) travels down the cylindrical tube and escapes where the tube opens, either at an open hole or at the end of the tube (see diagram: image 1).
2. More than a 'neutral' amount of air escapes from the instrument, which creates a slight vacuum or rarefaction in the clarinet tube. This rarefaction wave travels back up the tube (image 2).
3. The rarefaction is reflected off the sloping end wall of the clarinet mouthpiece. The opening between the reed and the mouthpiece makes very little difference to the reflection of the rarefaction wave. This is because the opening is very small compared to the size of the tube, so almost the entire wave is reflected back down the tube even if the reed is completely open at the time the wave hits (image 3).
4. When the rarefaction wave reaches the other (open) end of the tube, air rushes in to fill the slight vacuum. A little more than a 'neutral' amount of air enters the tube and causes a compression wave to travel back up the tube (image 4). Once the compression wave reaches the mouthpiece end of the tube it is reflected back down. At this point, either because the compression wave 'bumped' the reed or because of the natural vibration cycle of the reed, the gap opens and another puff of air is sent down the tube.
5. The original compression wave, now greatly reinforced by the second puff of air, travels down the tube two more times (four lengths in total) before the cycle is repeated again.

In addition to this primary compression wave, other waves, known as harmonics, are created. Harmonics are caused by factors including the imperfect wobbling and shaking of the reed, the reed sealing the mouthpiece opening for part of the wave cycle (which creates a flattened section of the sound wave), and imperfections (bumps and holes) in the bore. A wide variety of compression waves are created, but only some (primarily the odd harmonics) are reinforced. This, in combination with the cut-off frequency (where a significant drop in resonance occurs), results in the characteristic tone of the clarinet.

The bore is cylindrical for most of the tube with an inner bore diameter between 0.575 and 0.585 inches (14.6 and 14.9 mm), but there is a subtle hourglass shape, with the thinnest part below the junction between the upper and lower joint. This hourglass shape, although invisible to the naked eye, helps to correct the pitch and responsiveness of the instrument. The diameter of the bore affects the instrument's sound characteristics. The bell at the bottom of the clarinet flares out to improve the tone and tuning of the lowest notes. Modern standard clarinets are tuned to 440 to 442 Hz—concert pitch is 440 Hz—but adjusting the length of the bore can alter tuning, for example to match the pitch of a larger ensemble. Other factors that impact tuning include temperature and dynamics.

Most modern clarinets have "undercut" tone holes that improve intonation and sound. Undercutting means chamfering the bottom edge of tone holes inside the bore. Acoustically, this makes the tone hole function as if it were larger, but its main function is to allow the air column to follow the curve up through the tone hole (surface tension) instead of "blowing past" it under the increasingly directional frequencies of the upper registers. Covering or uncovering the tone holes varies the length of the pipe, changing the resonant frequencies of the enclosed air column and hence the pitch. The player moves between the chalumeau and clarion registers through use of the register key. The open register key stops the fundamental frequency from being reinforced, making the reed vibrate at three times the frequency, which produces a note a twelfth above the original note.

The fixed reed and fairly uniform diameter of the clarinet result in an acoustical performance approximating that of a cylindrical stopped pipe. Recorders use a tapered internal bore to overblow at the octave when the thumb/register hole is pinched open, while the clarinet, with its cylindrical bore, overblows at the twelfth. The low chalumeau register plays fundamentals, but the clarion (second) register plays the third harmonics, a perfect twelfth higher than the fundamentals. The first several notes of the altissimo (third) range, aided by the register key and venting with the first left-hand hole, play the fifth harmonics, a perfect twelfth plus a major sixth above the fundamentals. The fifth and seventh harmonics are also available, sounding a further sixth and fourth (a flat, diminished fifth) higher respectively; these are the notes of the altissimo register.

The lip position and pressure, shaping of the vocal tract, choice of reed and mouthpiece, amount of air pressure created, and evenness of the airflow account for most of the player's ability to control the tone of a clarinet. Their vocal tract will be shaped to resonate at frequencies associated with the tone being produced.

Vibrato, a pulsating change of pitch, is rare in classical literature; however, certain performers, such as Richard Stoltzman, use vibrato in classical music. Other effects are glissando, growling, trumpet sounds, double tongue, flutter tongue and circular breathing. Special lip-bending may be used to play microtonal intervals. There have also been efforts to create a quarter tone clarinet.

== Construction ==
=== Materials ===
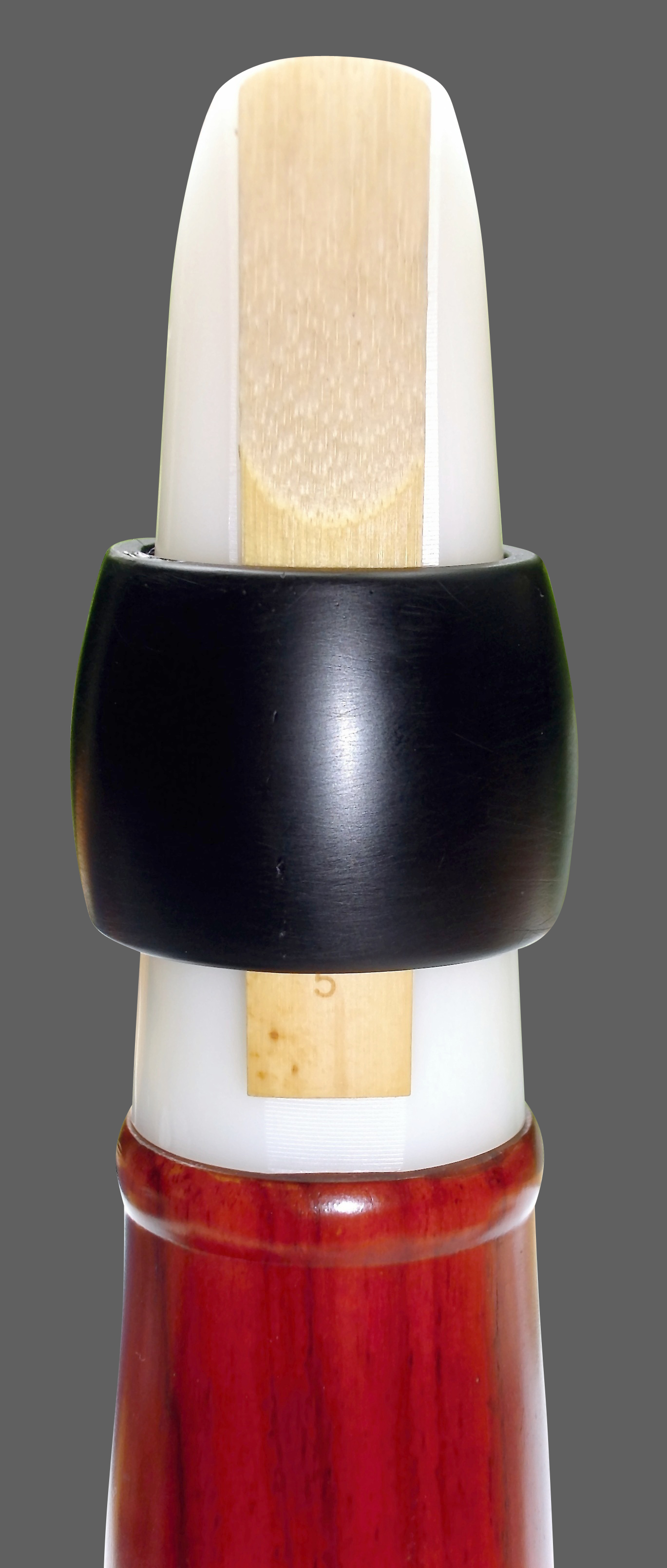
Mouthpiece with conical ring ligature, made from hard rubber, holding the reed in place

Clarinet bodies have been made from a variety of materials including wood, plastic, hard rubber or Ebonite, metal, and ivory. The vast majority of wooden clarinets are made from African blackwood (grenadilla), or, more uncommonly, Honduran rosewood, cocobolo, or mopane. Historically other woods, particularly boxwood and ebony, were used. Since the mid-20th century, clarinets (particularly student or band models) are also made from plastics, such as acrylonitrile butadiene styrene (ABS). One of the first such blends of plastic was Resonite, a term originally trademarked by Selmer. The Greenline model by Buffet Crampon is made from a composite of resin and the African blackwood powder left over from the manufacture of wooden clarinets. Metal soprano clarinets were popular in the late 19th century, particularly for military use. Metal is still used for the bodies of some contra-alto and contrabass clarinets and the necks and bells of nearly all alto and larger clarinets.

Mouthpieces are generally made of hard rubber, although some inexpensive mouthpieces may be made of plastic. Other materials such as glass, wood, ivory, and metal have also been used. Ligatures are often made of metal and tightened using one or more adjustment screws; other materials include plastic, string, or fabric.

=== Reed ===
The clarinet uses a single reed made from the cane of Arundo donax. Reeds may also be manufactured from synthetic materials. The ligature fastens the reed to the mouthpiece. When air is blown through the opening between the reed and the mouthpiece facing, the reed vibrates and produces the clarinet's sound.

Most players buy manufactured reeds, although many make adjustments to these reeds, and some make their own reeds from cane "blanks". Reeds come in varying degrees of hardness, generally indicated on a scale from one (soft) through five (hard). This numbering system is not standardized—reeds with the same number often vary in hardness across manufacturers and models. Reed and mouthpiece characteristics work together to determine ease of playability and tonal characteristics.

=== Components ===
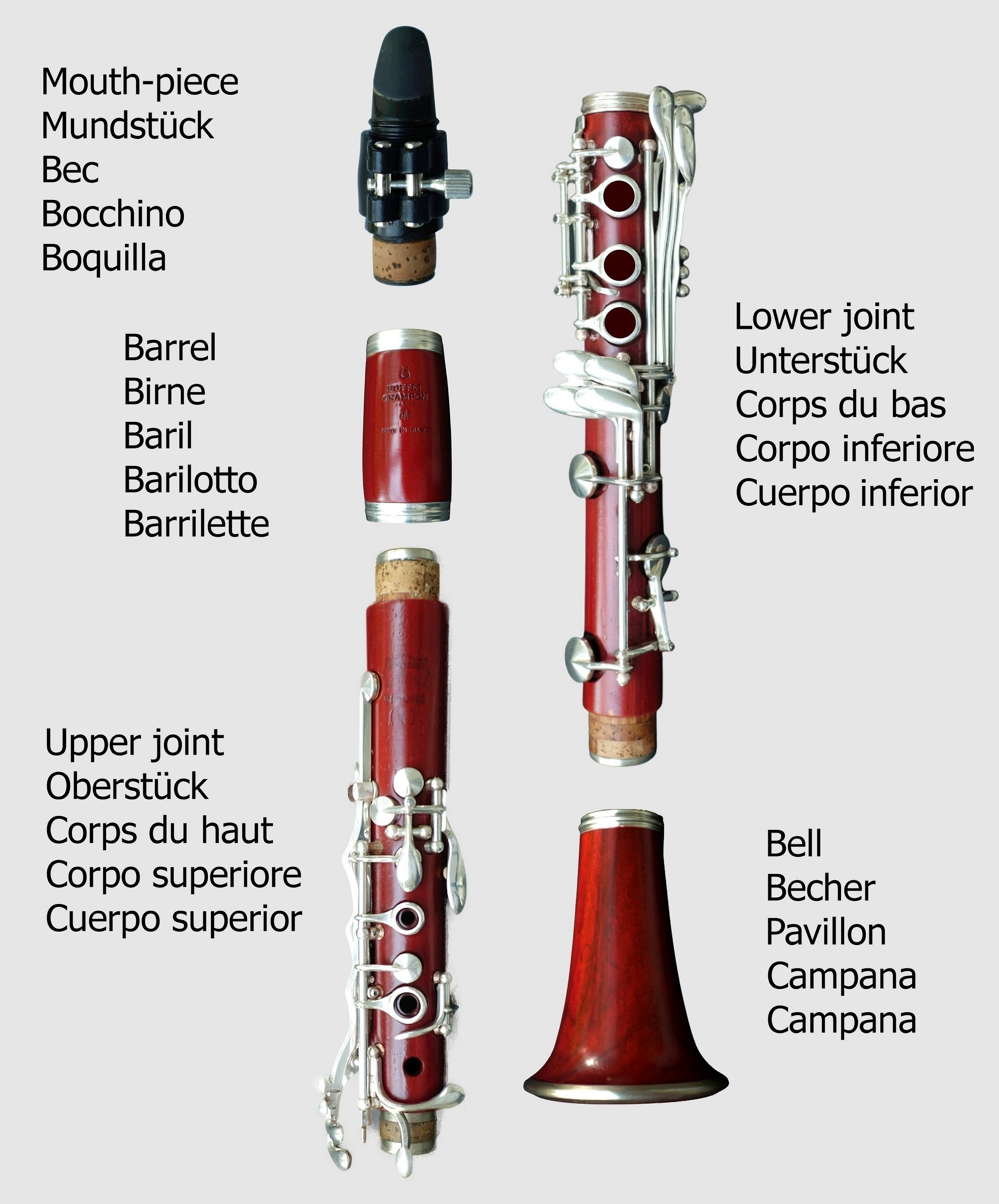
The construction of a Boehm system clarinet

The reed is attached to the mouthpiece by the ligature, and the top half-inch or so of this assembly is held in the player's mouth. In the past, string was used to bind the reed to the mouthpiece. The formation of the mouth around the mouthpiece and reed is called the embouchure. The reed is on the underside of the mouthpiece, pressing against the player's lower lip, while the top teeth normally contact the top of the mouthpiece (some players roll the upper lip under the top teeth to form what is called a 'double-lip' embouchure). Adjustments in the strength and shape of the embouchure change the tone and intonation. Players sometimes relieve the pressure on the upper teeth and inner lower lip by attaching a pad to the top of the mouthpiece or putting temporary cushioning on the lower teeth.

The mouthpiece attaches to the barrel. Tuning can be adjusted by using barrels of varying lengths or by pulling out the barrel to increase the instrument's length. On basset horns and lower clarinets, there is a curved metal neck instead of a barrel.

The main body of most clarinets has an upper joint, whose mechanism is mostly operated by the left hand, and a lower joint, mostly operated by the right hand. Some clarinets have a one-piece body. The modern soprano clarinet has numerous tone holes—seven are covered with the fingertips and the rest are operated using a set of 17 keys. The most common system of keys was named the Boehm system by its designer Hyacinthe Klosé after flute designer Theobald Boehm, but it is not the same as the Boehm system used on flutes. The other main key system is the Oehler system, which is used mostly in Germany and Austria. The related Albert system is used by some jazz, klezmer, and eastern European folk musicians. The Albert and Oehler systems are both based on the early Mueller system.

The cluster of keys at the bottom of the upper joint (protruding slightly beyond the cork of the joint) are known as the trill keys and are operated by the right hand. The entire weight of the smaller clarinets is supported by the right thumb behind the lower joint on what is called the thumb rest. Larger clarinets are supported with a neck strap or a floor peg.

Below the main body is a flared end known as the bell. The bell does not amplify the sound but improves the uniformity of the instrument's tone for the lowest notes in each register. For the other notes, the sound is produced almost entirely at the tone holes, and the bell is irrelevant. On basset horns and larger clarinets, the bell curves up and forward and is usually made of metal.

In the 1930s, some clarinets were manufactured with (filled) plateau keys, but they were expensive and had issues with sound quality. They were designed for use in cold weather (allowing gloves to be worn), for saxophone or flute players, and for players with certain physical requirements.

== Clarinet family and ranges ==
Clarinets have the largest pitch range of common woodwinds. The range of a clarinet is usually divided into three registers. The low chalumeau register extends from the notated E_{3} (C_{3} if available) to the notated B♭_{4}. The middle clarion register covers a little more than an octave (from the written B_{4} to C_{6}). The high altissimo register consists of the notes above it. The three registers have characteristically different sounds: the chalumeau is full and dark, the clarion register is brighter and sweet, like a high trumpet from a distance, and the altissimo can be piercing and sometimes shrill.

Initially, only C clarinets were available, but soon clarinets in B♭ and A and the basset horn in F and G were developed. From the 19th century to the middle of the 20th century, an extensive family of clarinets developed, from high A♭ to subcontrabass. Apart from the clarinets tuned in C (C soprano clarinet and basset clarinet in C), all clarinets are transposing instruments. The instruments above the C clarinet sound higher than notated, such as the aforementioned A♭ clarinet, a sixth higher; the longer instruments sound lower, such as the B♭ clarinet by one tone and the B♭ contrabass clarinet by two octaves and one tone.

Name	Key	Commentary	Range (written)	Range (sounding)	Sound examples played by Richard Haynes
Piccolo clarinet	A♭ (or G)	The A♭ clarinet is the highest-pitched clarinet still manufactured. It was used in 19th-century European military bands and in the on-stage banda of Italian opera, and is occasionally called for in 20th-century and contemporary orchestral and chamber works. The G was used for Schrammelmusik and is still made by German manufacturers.	E_{3} – G_{6}	C_{4} – E♭_{7}	Bartók, Scherzo for Piano and Orchestra (1905)
E♭ clarinet (Sopranino or piccolo clarinet in E♭)	E♭	The E-flat (E♭) clarinet is smaller than the more common B♭ clarinet. It has a characteristic "hard and biting" tone and is used in the orchestra when a brighter, or sometimes more comical, sound is called for. It is used in orchestras, concert bands, and marching bands, and plays a central role in clarinet choirs, carrying melodies that would be uncomfortably high for the B♭ clarinet. Solo repertoire is limited, but composers from Berlioz to Mahler have used it extensively as a solo instrument in orchestral contexts.	E_{3} – A_{6}	G_{3} – C_{7}	Ravel, Boléro (1928)
D clarinet	D	This type of clarinet was largely replaced by the E♭ clarinet. It was used in concerti by Johann Melchior Molter, in operas by Richard Wagner, and in Till Eulenspiegel by Richard Strauss. Stravinsky used both the D and E♭ clarinets in Le Sacre du Printemps.	E_{3} – A_{6}	F♯_{3} – B_{6}	
C clarinet (Soprano clarinet in C)	C	This clarinet was very common in the instrument's earliest period but its use dwindled, and by the end of the 1920s it had become practically obsolete. From the time of Mozart, many composers began to prefer the mellower lower-pitched instruments, and the timbre of the C instrument may have been considered too bright. To avoid having to carry an extra instrument that required another reed and mouthpiece, orchestral players preferred to play parts for this instrument on B♭ clarinets, transposing up a tone.	E_{3} – B♭_{6}	E_{3} – B♭_{6}	Rossini, The Barber of Seville (1816)
B♮ clarinet (Soprano clarinet in B♮)	B	Extremely rare. Used by Mozart in Idomeneo and Così fan tutte.	E_{3} – B_{6}	E♭_{3} – B♭_{6}	
B♭ clarinet (Soprano clarinet in B♭)	B♭	The B♭ clarinet is the most common type. Usually, the term "clarinet" on its own refers to this instrument.	E_{3} – C_{7}	D_{3} – B♭_{6}	Beethoven, Symphony No. 8 (1812)
A clarinet (Soprano clarinet in A)	A	The A clarinet is frequently used in orchestral and chamber music, especially of the nineteenth century.	E_{3} – C_{7}	C♯_{3} – A_{6}	Rachmaninoff, Symphony No. 2 (1907)
(Low) G clarinet (Soprano clarinet in G)	G	The G clarinet is commonly used in Turkish music.	E_{3} – C_{7}	B_{2} – G_{6}	
Basset clarinet	A (C, G, or B♭)	The basset clarinet is usually in A, though instruments have been built in C, G and B♭. It is used primarily to play Classical-era music, particularly Mozart's Clarinet Concerto. Basset clarinets with modern keywork have been built since 1951 for historically informed performances.	C_{3} – C_{7}	A_{2} – A_{6} (in A)	Mayr, Gloria Patri (played on a basset clarinet in G)
Basset horn	F (or G)	The basset horn is typically in F. Modern instruments resemble the E♭ alto clarinet but have a narrower bore closer to the B♭ clarinet. Mozart's clarinet concerto (K. 584b/621b) was originally sketched for a basset horn in G; his Requiem is "a cornerstone of the basset horn repertoire", and he included it in several operas and chamber pieces. Little other material for basset horn has been published.	C_{3} – C_{7}	F_{2} – F_{6} (in F)	Mozart, Requiem (1791)
Alto clarinet	E♭ (or F)	Sometimes referred to as the tenor clarinet in Europe, mainly used in military and concert bands and rarely in orchestras. The alto in F was used in early 19th-century military bands and was a favorite instrument of Iwan Müller before falling out of use. If called for, it is commonly substituted with the basset horn. The range is usually to the standard low E, but sometimes has keys to low E♭ or D.	E_{3} – C_{7}	G_{2} – E♭_{6} (in E♭)	
Bass clarinet	B♭	Developed in the late 18th century, the bass clarinet began featuring in orchestral music in the 1830s after its redesign by Adolphe Sax. It has since become a mainstay of the modern orchestra. It is also used in concert bands and enjoys (along with the B♭ clarinet) a considerable role in jazz, especially through jazz musician Eric Dolphy. Modern instruments have keys to at least low E♭ and usually to C.	C_{3} – C_{7}	B♭_{1} – B♭_{5}	Strauss, Don Quixote (1897)
Contra-alto clarinet (also contralto or E♭ contrabass clarinet)	E♭	The first contra-alto clarinet was made in F by the German maker Streitwolf in 1829. Modern instruments with Boehm and Oehler fingering were developed in 1950s with keys to low E♭ (sometimes C) and primarily used in concert bands and occasionally film scores.	E♭_{3} – A_{6}	G♭_{1} – C_{5}	Oren Boneh, Municipal Shuffle (2023)
Contrabass clarinet (also double-bass clarinet)	B♭	The contrabass is mainly used in clarinet ensembles and concert bands. It occasionally appears in contemporary classical music and film scores.	C_{3} – A_{6}	B♭_{0} – G_{4}	Mahler, Symphony No. 9 (1909) (Note: This work is originally scored for standard bass clarinet.)
Octocontrabass clarinet (sometimes called subcontrabass clarinet)	B♭	A prototype octocontrabass clarinet, one octave lower than the contrabass, was built by Leblanc in 1939 with keys to low D (sounding C_{0}) and survives in the Musée des Instruments à vent. In 2025, the German maker Martin Foag introduced an octocontrabass with keys to low C (sounding B♭_{−1}).	C_{3} – A_{6}	B♭_{−1} – G_{3}	

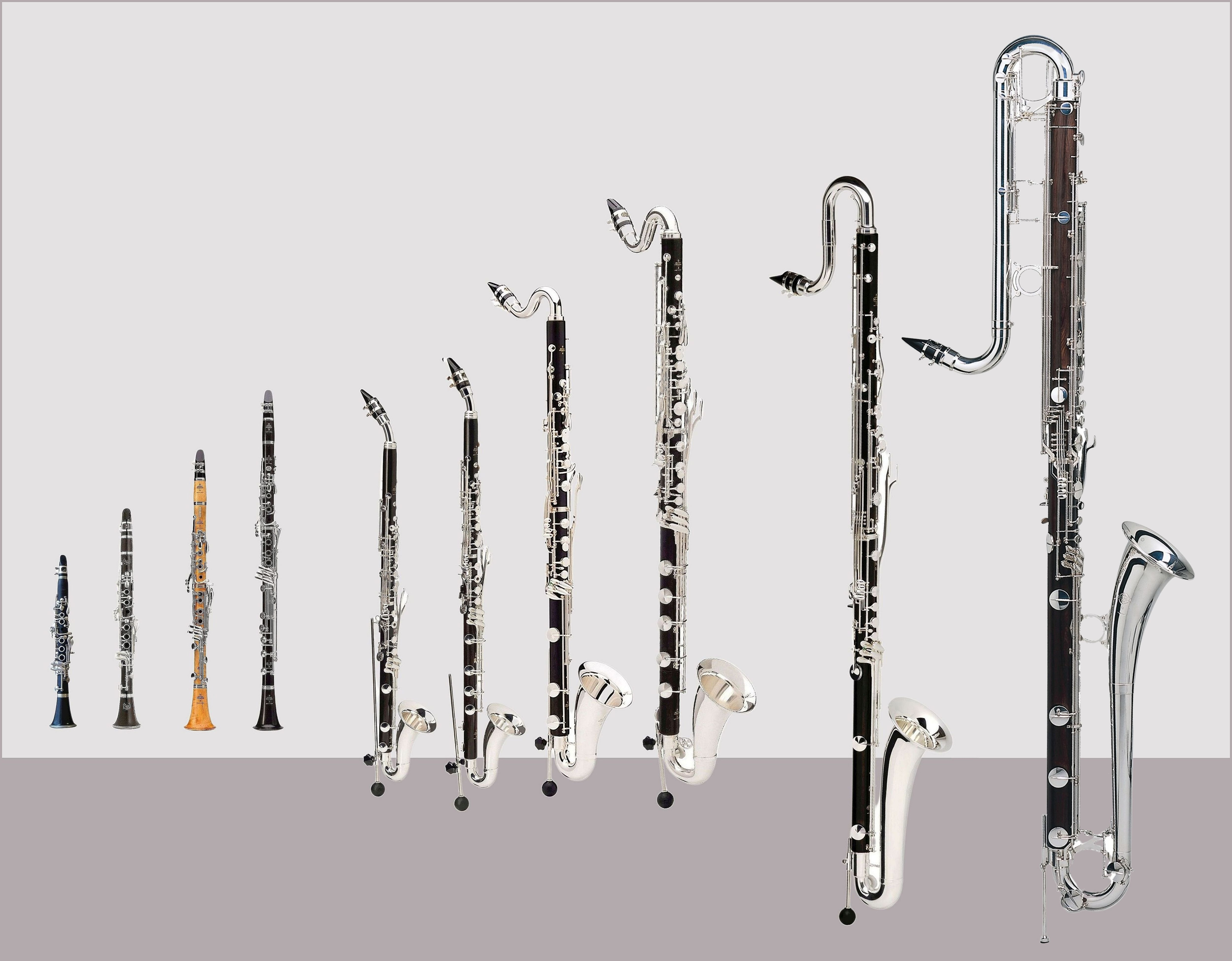
Clarinets in A♭, E♭ and B♭, basset clarinet in A, alto clarinet range to low E♭, basset horn, bass clarinet range to low E♭, bass clarinet range to low C, contra alto clarinet and contrabass clarinet

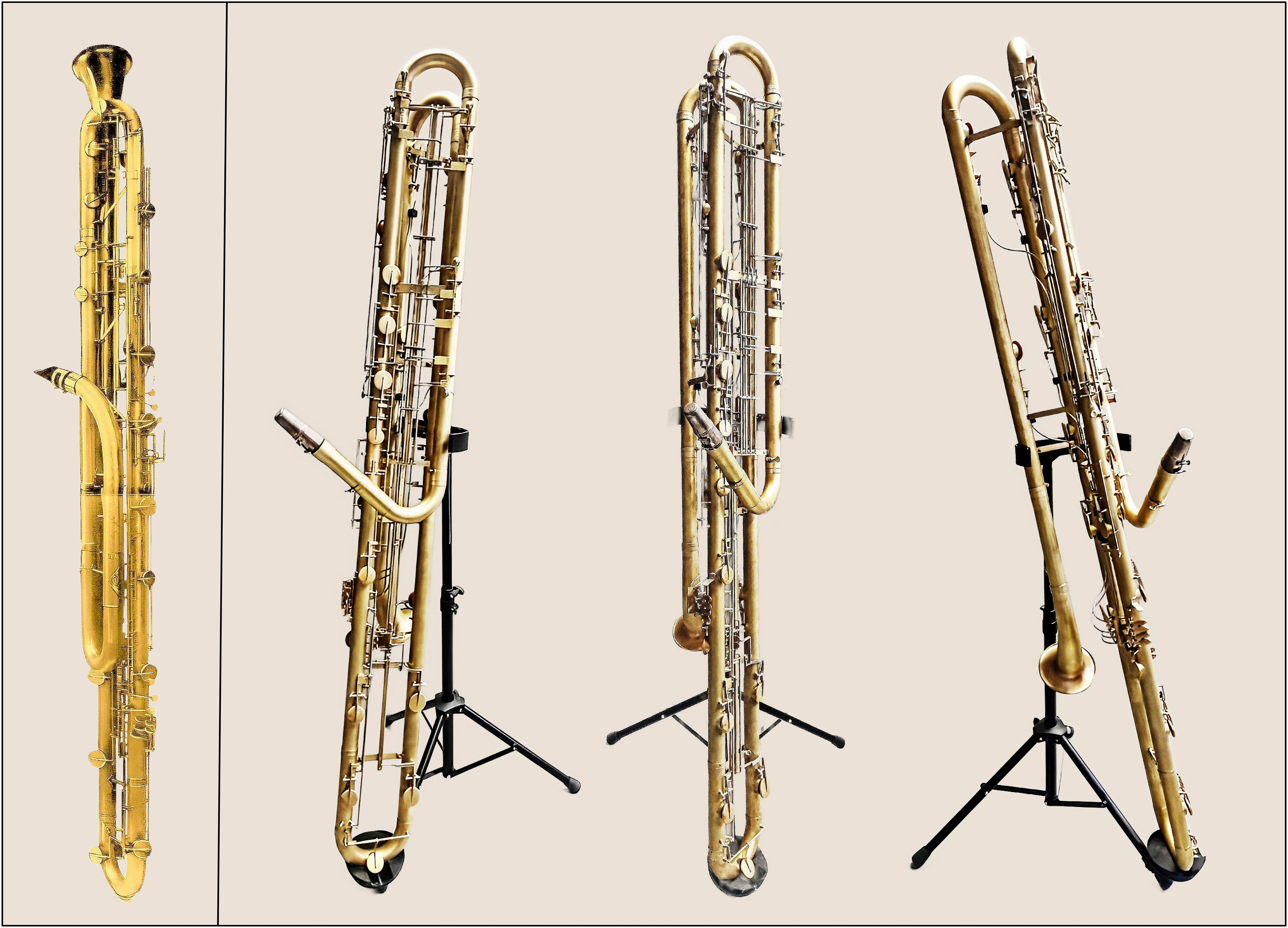
Subcontrabass clarinets by Leblanc 1939 and Foag 2025

== Performance practice ==
The modern orchestra frequently includes two clarinetists, each usually equipped with a B♭ and an A clarinet, and clarinet parts commonly alternate between the instruments. The standard of using soprano clarinets in B♭ and A has to do partly with the history of the instrument and partly with acoustics and aesthetics. Before about 1800, due to the lack of airtight pads, practical woodwinds could have only a few keys. The low (chalumeau) register of the clarinet spans a twelfth (an octave plus a perfect fifth) before overblowing, so the clarinet needs keys/holes to produce all nineteen notes in this range. This involves more keywork than on instruments that "overblow" at the octave—oboes, flutes, bassoons, and saxophones need only twelve notes before overblowing. Since clarinets with few keys cannot play chromatically, they are limited to playing in closely related keys. With the advent of airtight pads and improved key technology, more keys were added to woodwinds and the need for clarinets in multiple keys was reduced. The use of instruments in C, B♭, and A persisted, with each used as specified by the composer.

The lower-pitched clarinets sound "mellower" (less bright), and the C clarinet—the highest and brightest sounding of these three—fell out of favor as the other two could cover its range and their sound was considered better. While the clarinet in C began to fall out of general use around 1850, some composers continued to write C parts. Others employed many different clarinets, including the E♭ or D soprano clarinets, basset horn, bass clarinet, and contrabass clarinet. The practice of using different clarinets to achieve tonal variety was common in 20th-century classical music. While technical improvements and an equal-tempered scale reduced the need for two clarinets, the technical difficulty of playing in remote keys persisted, and the A has remained a standard orchestral instrument.

Common combinations involving clarinet in chamber music are:

- Clarinet and piano.
- Clarinet trio: clarinet, piano, and another instrument (for example, a string instrument).
- Clarinet quartet: three B♭ clarinets and bass clarinet; two B♭ clarinets, alto clarinet, and bass; two B♭, an E♭ alto clarinet, and a B♭ bass clarinet; sometimes four B♭ sopranos; and other possibilities such as the use of a basset horn, especially in European classical works.
- Clarinet quintet: a clarinet plus a string quartet or, in more contemporary music, a configuration of five clarinets.
- Wind quintet: flute, oboe, clarinet, bassoon, and horn.

The E♭ clarinet, B♭ clarinet, alto clarinet, bass clarinet, and contra-alto/contrabass clarinet are commonly used in concert bands, which generally have multiple B♭ clarinets; there are commonly three or even four B♭ clarinet parts with two to three players per part. The clarinet is also used in military bands; author Eric Hoeprich suggests that "it was the role of the clarinet in the military band... that ultimately provided the key to its future popularity", since it was particularly suited to the ensemble.

Clarinet choir contains many clarinets playing together, usually including several members of the clarinet family. This ensemble first emerged in 1927. The homogeneity of tone across the different members of the clarinet family produces an effect with some similarities to a human choir. Parts for non-clarinets, such as voice or French horn, are sometimes included in the repertoire.

== Repertoire ==
=== Classical ===
The clarinet evolved later than other orchestral woodwind instruments, leaving solo repertoire from the Classical period onward, but few works from the Baroque era. Examples of the first uses of clarinets include Vivaldi's 1716 oratorio Juditha triumphans with two C clarinets, and Handel's 1740 Ouverture for two clarinets and horn. In the 1750s, clarinets were introduced in the orchestra of La Pouplinière in Paris. Johann Stamitz composed the first known concerto for B♭ clarinet for the principal clarinetist of this orchestra. Johann Melchior Molter wrote six clarinet concertos for clarinet in D, the first dated to around 1742.

Clarinets appeared in the Mannheim orchestra under Stamitz and in other orchestras from 1758, but were not commonly used before the 19th century. Harmonie wind ensembles including clarinets were common from the mid-18th century. Classical composers of solo or duo concertos for this instrument included Karl Stamitz and František Xaver Pokorný. The first clarinet sonata was written in 1770 by the Neapolitan composer Gregorio Sciroli.

Larghetto from the Mozart Quintet; Vlad Weverbergh on a replica of the Stadler clarinet

Wolfgang Amadeus Mozart first used the clarinet in 1771 in his Divertimento K. 113 and later in the Paris Symphony of 1778. From Idomeneo onward, the clarinet appeared in all his operas, as well as in his symphonies and piano concertos. His chamber works for clarinet include the Gran Partita, the Clarinet Quintet, and the Kegelstatt Trio. The latter two works were written for his friend, virtuoso Anton Stadler, as was his Clarinet Concerto. Beethoven's chamber music highlights the instrument, particularly in the Quintet Op. 16, the Septet Op. 20 and Trio Op. 38.

While the Classical period often used the clarinet, the Romantic era incorporated it more as an integral part of the orchestra. The clarinet became a staple, with composers such as Schubert, Mendelssohn, Berlioz, Dvořák, Smetana, Brahms, Tchaikovsky, and Rimsky-Korsakov writing prominent clarinet passages in their orchestral works. In Romantic opera orchestration, the clarinet frequently takes on expressive, lyrical roles. The clarinet section expanded to three or more players, with some performing on auxiliary instruments such as the bass clarinet. Certain operas, such as Strauss's Elektra, require up to eight players.

Chamber music featuring the clarinet became increasingly diverse. The instrument appears in the works of Franz Schubert (Octet), Felix Mendelssohn (sonata with piano), Robert Schumann (Phantasiestücke for clarinet and piano, Märchenerzählungen with piano and viola), and Johannes Brahms (two sonatas, the Trio with cello and piano and the Clarinet Quintet for Clarinet in A and string quartet). Carl Maria von Weber wrote several major works for the clarinet, including the Clarinet Concerto No. 1 in F minor, the Clarinet Concerto No. 2 in E flat major, and the Grand Duo Concertant for clarinet and piano. However, from 1830 until 1900 "no major composer wrote a clarinet concerto, and the few concertos written for the instrument in this time period have not found a secure place in the repertoire".

The clarinet is used frequently in 20th- and 21st-century classical music. It embodies the cat in Peter and the Wolf by Sergei Prokofiev, and the symphonies of Shostakovich "provide a veritable compendium of writing for all members of the orchestral clarinet family; for him the instruments provided a toolkit for the expression of the deepest tragedy as well as the sharpest satire". Significant pieces for unaccompanied clarinet include Three Pieces (1919) by Igor Stravinsky and "L'abîme des oiseaux" from the Quatuor pour la fin du temps (1941) by Olivier Messiaen. Concertos with orchestral accompaniment from this period include those by Carl Nielsen and Aaron Copland. Sonatas were composed by Felix Draeseke, Max Reger, Arnold Bax, John Ireland, Francis Poulenc, Leonard Bernstein, and Paul Hindemith. Notable chamber works include Four Pieces by Alban Berg, Contrastes with violin and piano by Béla Bartók, The Soldier's Tale by Stravinsky, and the Suite for clarinet, violin and piano by Darius Milhaud.

=== Jazz ===
Rhapsody in Blue
The United States Marine Band's 2018 performance of the 1924 jazz band version, opening with the clarinet glissando

The clarinet was a central instrument in jazz, beginning with early jazz players in the 1910s. It remained a signature instrument of the genre through much of the big band era into the 1940s. One of the most recognizable clarinet excerpts is the virtuoso glissando that introduces the 1924 Rhapsody in Blue by George Gershwin. Swing performers such as Benny Goodman and Artie Shaw rose to prominence in the late 1930s.

Beginning in the 1940s, the clarinet faded from its prominent position in jazz. By that time, an interest in Dixieland, a revival of traditional New Orleans jazz, had begun. Pete Fountain was one of the best known performers in this genre. The clarinet's place in the jazz ensemble was usurped by the saxophone, which projects a more powerful sound and uses a less complicated fingering system. The clarinet did not entirely disappear from jazz—prominent players since the 1950s include Stan Hasselgård, Jimmy Giuffre, Eric Dolphy (on bass clarinet), Perry Robinson, and John Carter. In the US, the prominent players on the instrument since the 1980s have included Eddie Daniels, Don Byron, Marty Ehrlich, Ken Peplowski, and others playing in both traditional and contemporary styles.

=== Other genres ===
The clarinet is uncommon, but not unheard of, in rock music. Jerry Martini played clarinet on Sly and the Family Stone's 1968 hit, "Dance to the Music". The Beatles included a trio of clarinets in "When I'm Sixty-Four" from their Sgt. Pepper's Lonely Hearts Club Band album. A clarinet is prominently featured in what a Billboard reviewer termed a "Benny Goodman-flavored clarinet solo" in "Breakfast in America", the title song from the Supertramp album of the same name.

The clarinet has a significant role in vernacular music in many parts of the world. Clarinets feature prominently in klezmer music, which employs a distinctive style of playing. The popular Brazilian music style of choro uses the clarinet, as does Albanian saze and Greek kompania folk music, and Bulgarian wedding music. In Turkish folk music, the Albert system clarinet in G is often used, commonly called a "Turkish clarinet".

== See also ==
- List of clarinet concerti
- List of clarinetists
- List of clarinet makers
- Double clarinet
- International Clarinet Association
