= Woodwind instrument =

Family of musical wind instruments

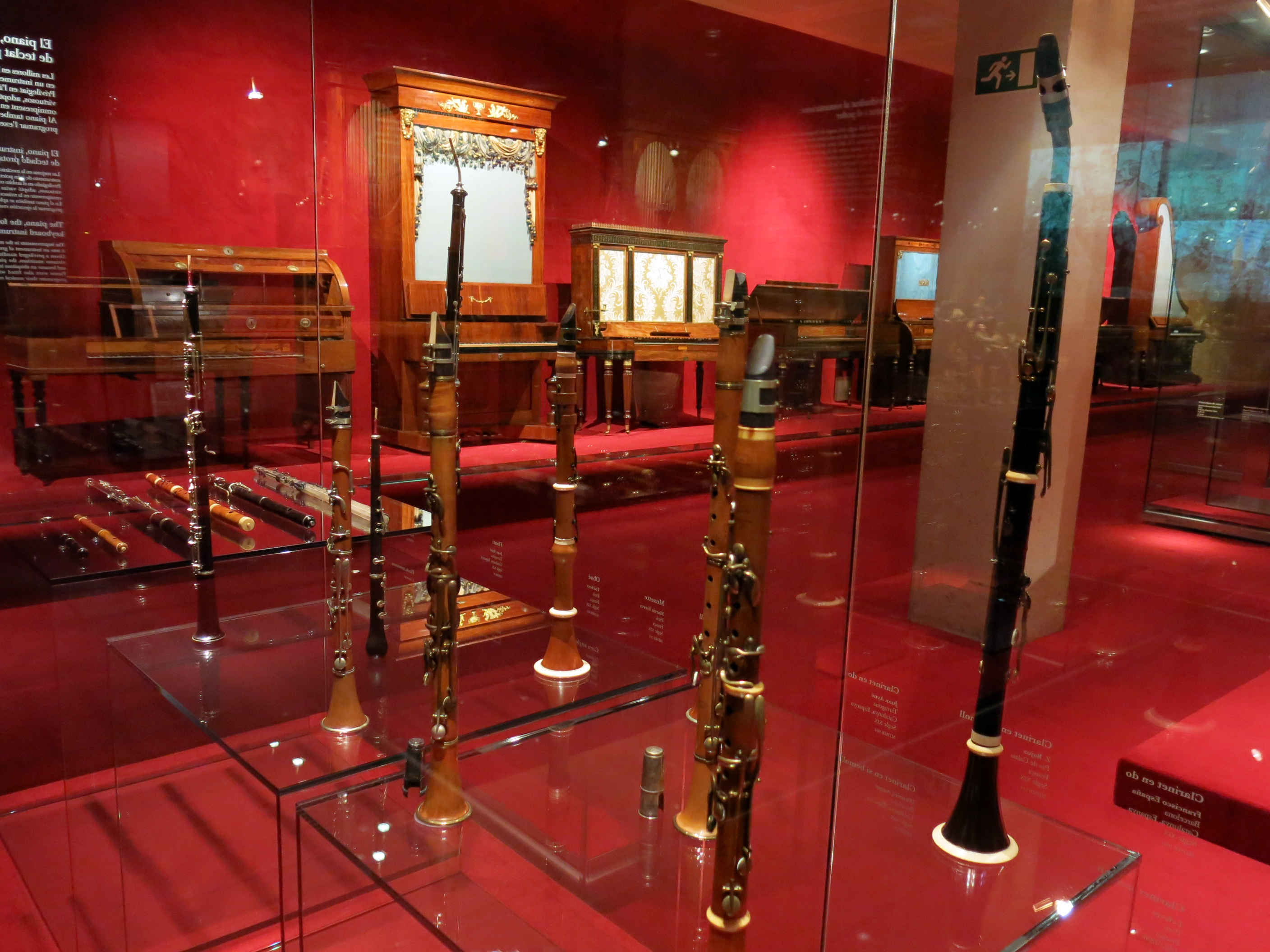
Woodwind instruments at the Museu de la Música de Barcelona.

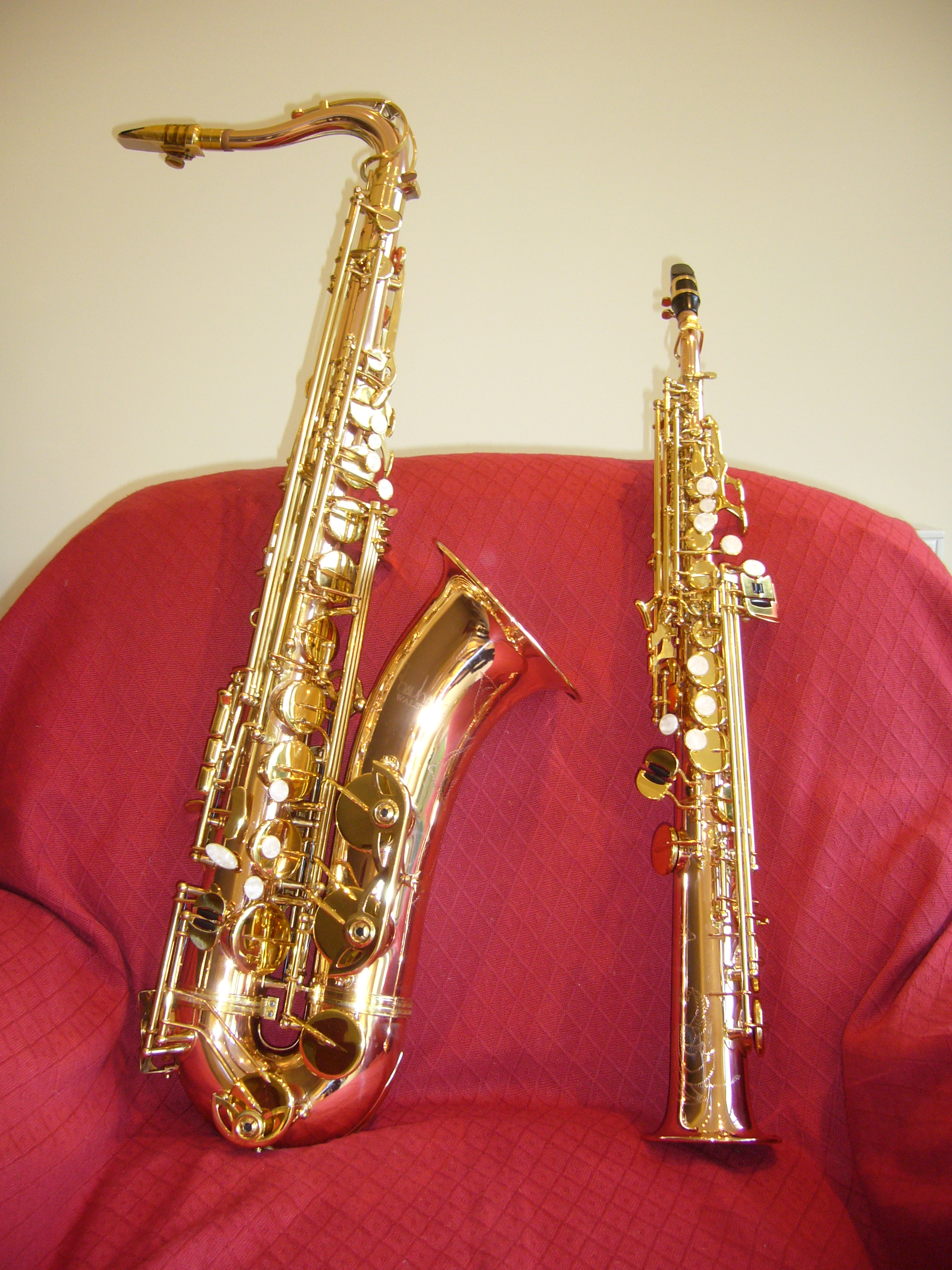
Tenor and soprano saxophones

Woodwind instruments are a family of musical instruments within the greater category of wind instruments.

Common examples include flute, clarinet, oboe, bassoon, and saxophone. There are two main types of woodwind instruments: flutes and reed instruments (otherwise called reed pipes). The main distinction between these instruments and other wind instruments is the way in which they produce sound. All woodwinds produce sound either by splitting the air blown into them on a sharp edge, such as a fipple (e.g. flute, recorder), or by the coupled oscillation of one or two reeds and an air column (e.g. clarinet, bassoon). Despite the name, a woodwind may be made of any material, not just wood. Common examples of other materials include brass, silver, cane, and other metals such as gold and platinum. The saxophone, for example, though made of brass, is considered a woodwind because it requires a reed to produce sound. Occasionally, woodwinds are made of earthen materials, especially ocarinas.

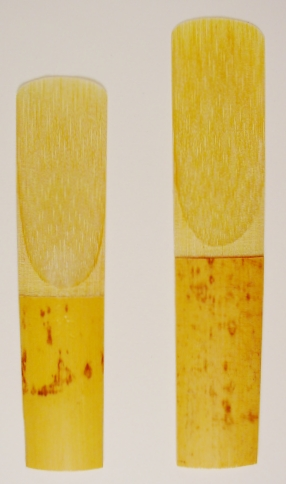
Alto and tenor saxophone reeds

== Flutes ==
Flutes produce sound by directing a focused stream of air across the edge of a hole in a cylindrical tube. The flute family can be divided into two subfamilies: open flutes and closed flutes.

To produce a sound with an open flute, the player is required to blow a stream of air across a sharp edge that then splits the airstream. This split air stream then acts upon the air column contained within the flute's hollow, causing it to vibrate and produce sound. Examples of open flutes are the transverse flute, panpipes, and shakuhachi. Ancient flutes of this variety, including bamboo flutes, were often made from tubular sections of plants such as grasses, reeds, bamboo, and hollowed-out tree branches. Later, flutes were made of metals such as tin, copper, or bronze. Modern concert flutes are usually made of high-grade metal alloys, usually containing nickel, silver, copper, or gold.

To produce a sound with a closed flute, the player is required to blow air into a duct. This duct acts as a channel, bringing the air to a sharp edge. As with the open flutes, the air is then split; this causes the column of air within the closed flute to vibrate and produce sound. Examples of this type of flute include the recorder, ocarina, and organ pipes.

== Reed instruments ==
Reed instruments produce sound by focusing air into a mouthpiece, which then causes a reed (or reeds) to vibrate. Reed pipes are divided into single-reed instruments and double-reed instruments.

Single-reed woodwinds produce sound by attaching a reed to the opening of a mouthpiece (using a ligature). When air is forced between the reed and the mouthpiece, the reed causes the air column in the instrument to vibrate and produce its unique sound. Single reed instruments include the clarinet and saxophone.

Double reed instruments use two precisely cut, small pieces of cane bound together at the base. This form of sound production has been estimated to have originated in the middle to late Neolithic period; its discovery has been attributed to the observation of wind blowing through a split rush. The finished, bound reed is inserted into the instrument and vibrates as air is forced between the two pieces (again, causing the air within the instrument to vibrate as well). This family of reed pipes is subdivided further into another two subfamilies: exposed double reed, and capped double reed instruments.

Exposed double-reed instruments are played by having the double reed directly between the player's lips. This family includes instruments such as the oboe, cor anglais (also called English horn), and bassoon, and many types of shawms throughout the world.

Capped double-reed instruments, on the other hand, have the double reed covered by a cap; the player blows through a hole in this cap that then directs the air through the reeds. This family includes the crumhorn.

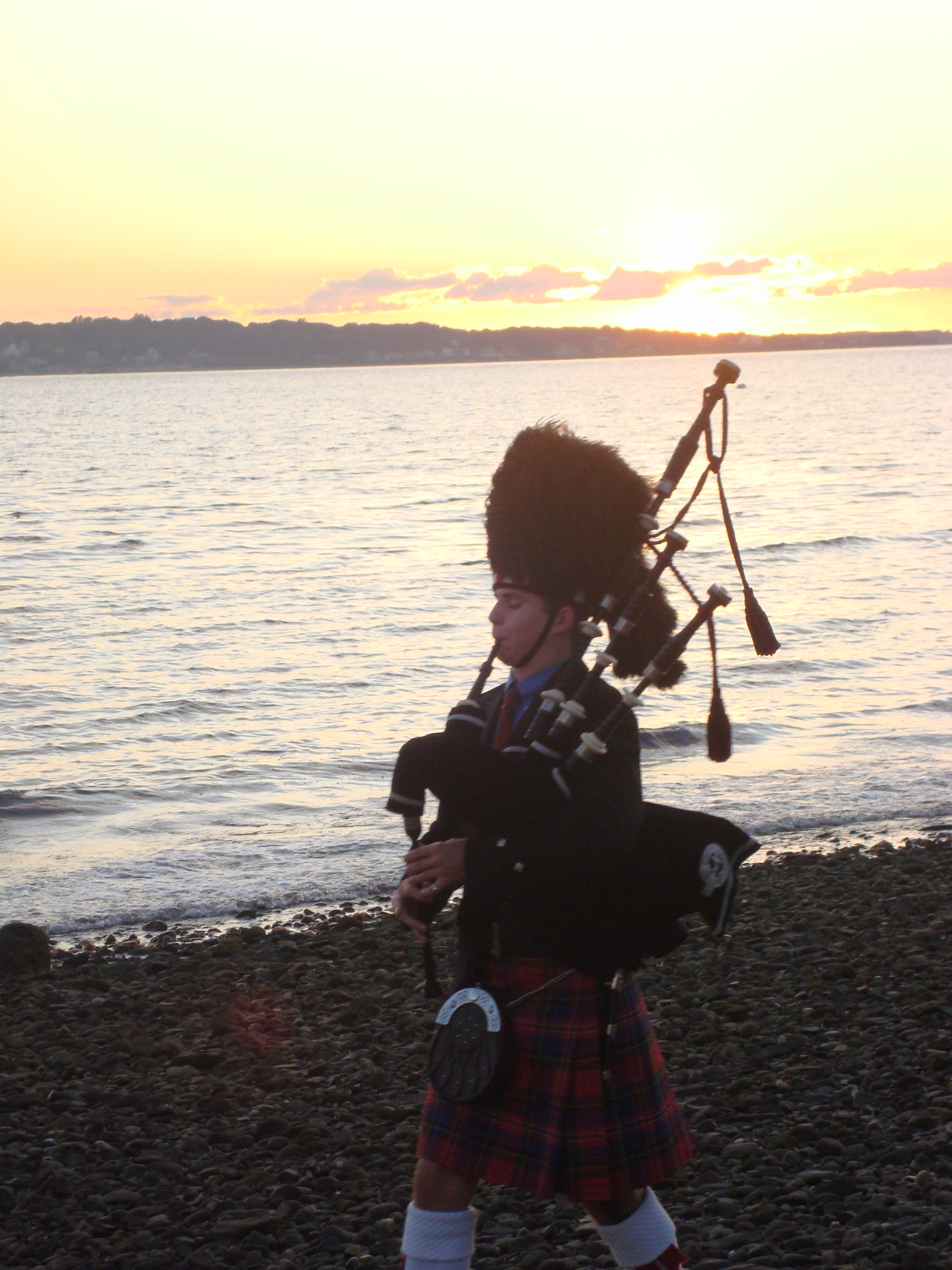
A piper playing the bagpipes in Newport, Rhode Island

Bagpipes are unique reed pipe instruments, since they use two or more double or single reeds. However, bagpipes are functionally the same as capped double reed instruments, since the reeds are never in direct contact with the player's lips.

Free reed aerophone instruments are likewise unique since sound is produced by 'free reeds' – small metal tongues arranged in rows within a metal or wooden frame. The airflow necessary for the instrument's sound is generated either by a player's breath (e.g. harmonica), or by bellows (e.g. accordion).

== Modern orchestra and concert band woodwinds ==
The modern orchestra's woodwind section typically includes flutes, oboes, clarinets, and bassoons. Supplementary instruments include piccolo, cor anglais, bass clarinet, E-flat clarinet, and contrabassoon. Saxophones are also used on occasion.

The concert band's woodwind section is typically much larger and more diverse than the orchestra's. It typically includes piccolo(s), flutes, oboes, B♭ clarinets, bass clarinet(s), bassoons, alto saxophones, tenor saxophone(s), and baritone saxophone(s). Alto and bass flutes, cor anglais, E♭ clarinet, alto clarinet or basset horn(s), contra-alto or contrabass clarinet(s), contrabassoon, and soprano and bass saxophones are also sometimes used.

== See also ==
- Brass instrument
- Wind instrument
