= Register key =

Key for higher notes on woodwind instruments

The register key is a key on woodwind instruments that is used to play in the higher registers.

== Clarinet ==
On the clarinet, the register key is used to play in the second register; that is, it raises the pitch of most first-register notes by a twelfth (19 semitones) when pressed. It is positioned above the left thumb hole and is operated by the left thumb. The same key used in combination with the left first finger key which produces the written note A_{4} (in scientific pitch notation) is used to play B♭_{4}. Some clarinets, particularly bass clarinets and lower, have separate keys, or a more complex key mechanism, to control two or three separate holes for playing B♭, for playing the lower notes of the second register, and for playing the upper notes of the second register.

The octave key is a key on the saxophone or oboe that raises the pitch of most notes by an octave when pressed, so that similar fingerings can be used for two different octaves.

== Saxophone ==
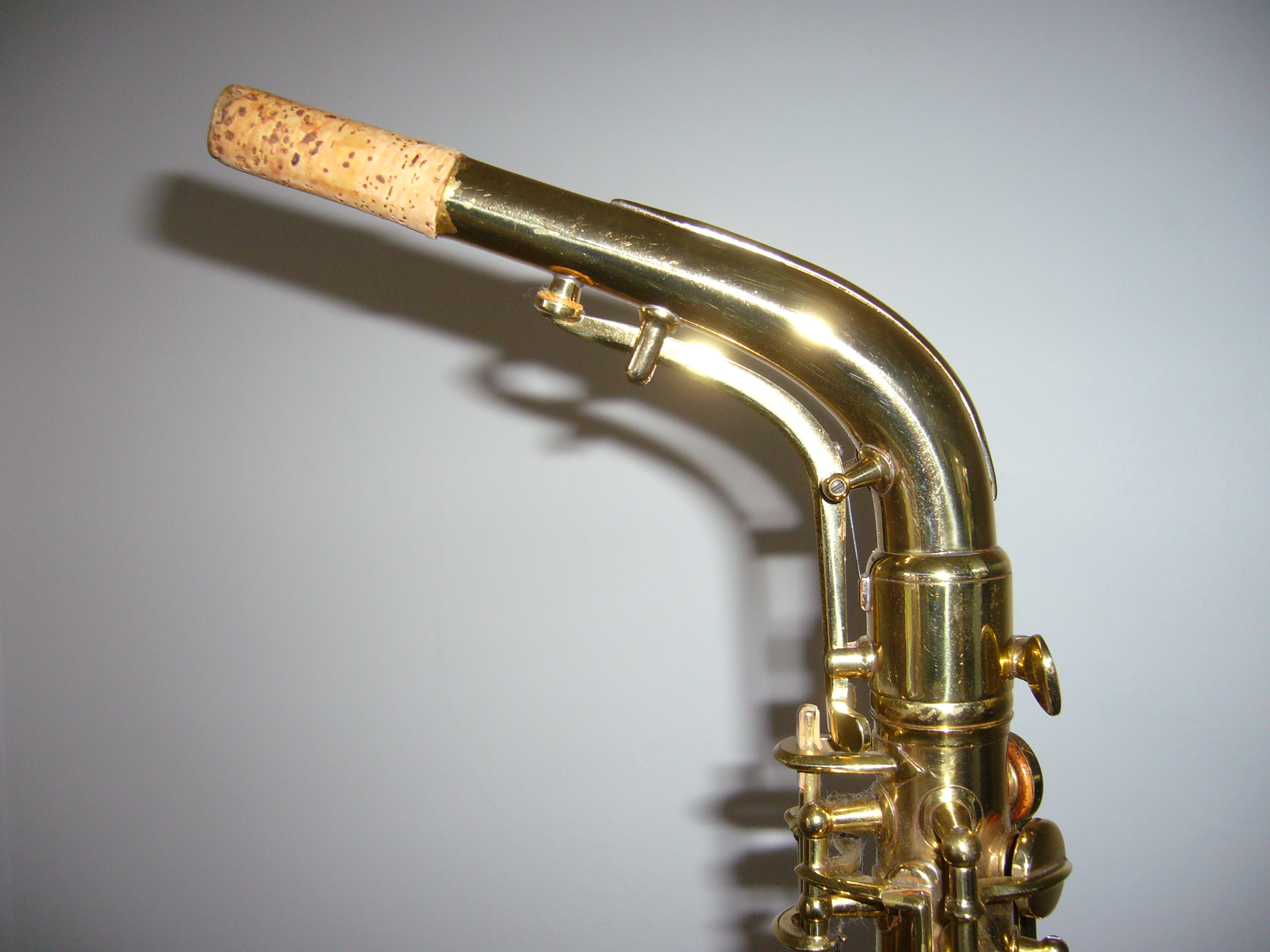
The unusual and distinctive "underslung" octave key mechanism on a Conn 6M "Lady Face" alto saxophone.

On a saxophone, the octave key is positioned next to the left-hand thumb rest. Pressing the octave key opens the top tone hole in the neck of the saxophone. Alternatively, whenever the G key is fingered, the top tone hole closes and a small tone hole is opened near the top of the body.

Some baritone saxophones, notably those made by Yamaha, also have three octave tone holes. The third one is used to prevent a rough transition from G# to A.

== Oboe ==
The modern oboe has two octave keys, sometimes three, often interconnected, the one for E5 to G#5 near the left thumb, and the one for A5 to C6 to the right of and above the front keys, depressed by the edge of the left index finger. Oboes are now available with automatic octaves. This involves extra keywork that frees the player from having to bother with an octave key at all. The bassoon has similar keys used by the left thumb, but these are usually only depressed at the attack of notes, or "flicked".

== See also ==
- Mazzeo system
