= Mazzeo system =

Key system for the clarinet

The Mazzeo system is a key system for the clarinet invented by Rosario Mazzeo in the mid-1950s, and is a modification of the Boehm system. Exclusive mass-production rights were given to the Selmer company, although only 13,000 were made. Selmer’s Mazzeo mechanism was targeted for its soprano (Bb/A) clarinets, but the firm provided at least one player with Mazzeo-enhanced Eb and bass clarinets as well.

Selmer first marketed the instrument in 1959: "Over the past 75 years, many new clarinet key Systems have been submitted to Selmer. Yet the Mazzeo system is the first we have ever placed in production. The reason: It is the first to offer realistically practical advantages for ever clarinetist. To the professional, the Mazzeo system Selmer clarinets offer increased technical fluency, improved tonal balance, more accurate intonation, and the possibility of flawless performance of passages formerly considered hopelessly awkward....To the student who from the beginning uses the Mazzeo system will benefit by more rapid development of correct embouchure and hand positions, and complete elimination of traditional clarinet throat register problems." Selmer’s early promotion included summer 1959 Tanglewood scholarships to “enable clarinet teachers to learn the teaching technique of the new Mazzeo System clarinets from their originator, Rosario Mazzeo.”

Selmer's advertising continued as late as 1975.

Many are now in museums, but some are in private collections or can be found for sale. In addition to the instruments made in France, Selmer's "Bundy" and "Signet" lines of student instruments (made in the U.S.) each included a Mazzeo model.

The differences between a Boehm system clarinet and a Mazzeo system clarinet are

- The throat B♭ using the A key and any one or combination of left-hand second or third finger or right-hand first, second, or third fingers to operate a linkage opening the third right-index-finger trill key, rather than using the inadequately vented register key to obtain that pitch; the same fingerings, minus A key, produce A; traditional (Boehm) B♭ and A fingerings are also available;
- A left-hand-thumb plateau key;
- A ringless bell with less flare.

Full and modified Mazzeo clarinets feature

- An E♭/B♭ key playable with the thumb, first, and third fingers and D♭/A♭ key on the left-hand side;
- An articulated B♭ to C♯ keys;
- An alternate left-hand A♭/E♭ key.
