= Ligature (instrument) =

Device which holds a reed onto the mouthpiece of a single-reed instrument

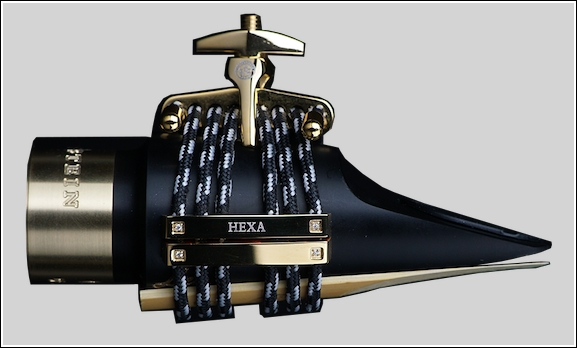
Saxophone mouthpiece with ligature (Silverstein)

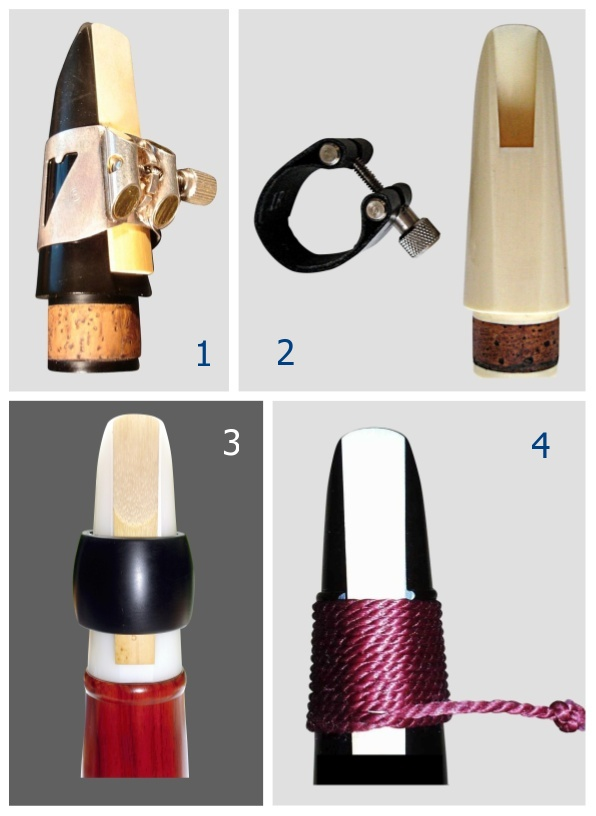
Clarinet mouthpieces with different ligatures: 1 metal ligature 2 textile ligature 3 conical ring made of hard rubber 4 reed cord (only in Germany) 1 to 3 also for saxophones

A ligature is a device which holds a reed onto the mouthpiece of a single-reed instrument such as a saxophone or clarinet. The ligature must secure the reed firmly against the table of the mouthpiece while allowing it to vibrate freely. The earliest ligatures were lengths of string wrapped over the reed and tied. Iwan Müller invented a metal ligature to replace twine. String is still used by clarinetists, especially in Germany. Modern German mouthpieces have a groove cut into the outside of the mouthpiece to facilitate wrapping with a string ligature. Some modern clarinetists even opt to use shoestring as a ligature substitute as it is more easily adjustable than string. Other modern clarinetists use electrical tape as a ligature.

A ligature must be placed properly in order to allow best performance on a reed instrument. The ligature must be placed at least halfway down the stock of the reed and the screws must not be overtightened, in order to allow free vibration and not distort the reed.

Ligatures are most commonly made out of metal and plated in nickel, silver, or gold. Ligatures are also made out of wire, wire mesh, plastic, naugahyde, heavy nylon fabric, wood, string, or leather. Ligatures fall into two general categories, depending on whether the band contacts the reed or a pressure plate, either riding the band or adjusted inward from a block mounted on the band, using a thumbscrew, is used.

Various features are incorporated into the design of ligatures to hold the reed securely while minimizing pressure distortion of the reed and allowing maximum vibration. Contact rails may be either parallel or transverse to the reed, on either a metal band or pressure plate type ligature. The contact rails may be either metal, wood, or plastic. Pressure plates may also have raised contact points, prongs, or a concave form to control contact with the reed. Some bands are designed for minimal contact with the mouthpiece, allowing even less absorption of the reed's vibrations. Nevertheless, in theory, the reed string remains the best means of fixing the reed with regard to its vibration behaviour, which is why some manufacturers have recently started to offer reed screws in which the reed is held in place with strings, usually made of rubber. With the screw, the tension of the strings can be varied, making the sound brighter or darker.
