= Albert system =

Clarinet keywork system

The Albert system refers to a system of clarinet keywork and fingering developed by Eugène Albert. In the United Kingdom, it is known as the simple system. It has been largely replaced by the Boehm system and Oehler system.

Big Band musician Jimmy Dorsey used a clarinet outfitted with the Albert system.

Albert system clarinets are still used, mainly in Belarusian, Russian, Ukrainian, Greek and Turkish folk music as well as Klezmer and Dixieland styles. Many musicians prefer the Albert system because its unkeyed tone holes make slurred notes easier to play.

The system is a derivative of the early 19th century 13-key system developed by Iwan Müller and is related to the more advanced Oehler system used by most German and Austrian clarinettists.

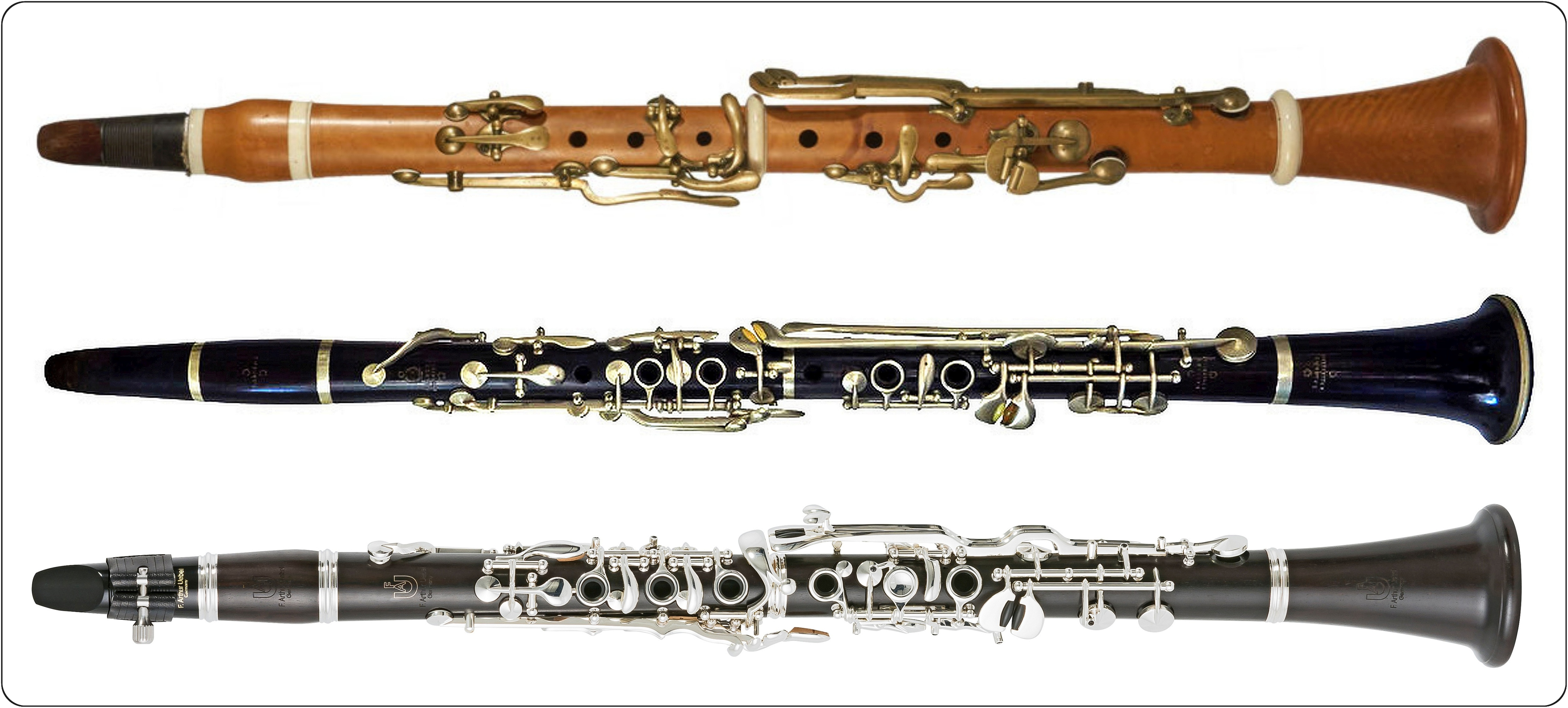
Comparison of clarinets after Iwan Müller, Eugène Albert and Oscar Oehler
