= Iwan Müller =

Russian musician and composer (1786–1854)

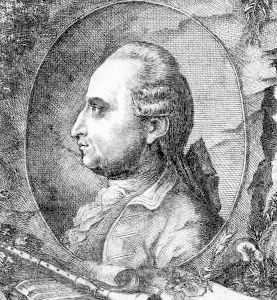
Iwan Müller

Iwan Müller, sometimes spelled Iwan Mueller (14 December 1786, Reval, Governorate of Estonia – 4 February 1854, Bückeburg), was a clarinetist, composer and inventor who at the beginning of the 19th century was responsible for a major step forward in the development of the clarinet, the air-tight pad.

== Biography ==
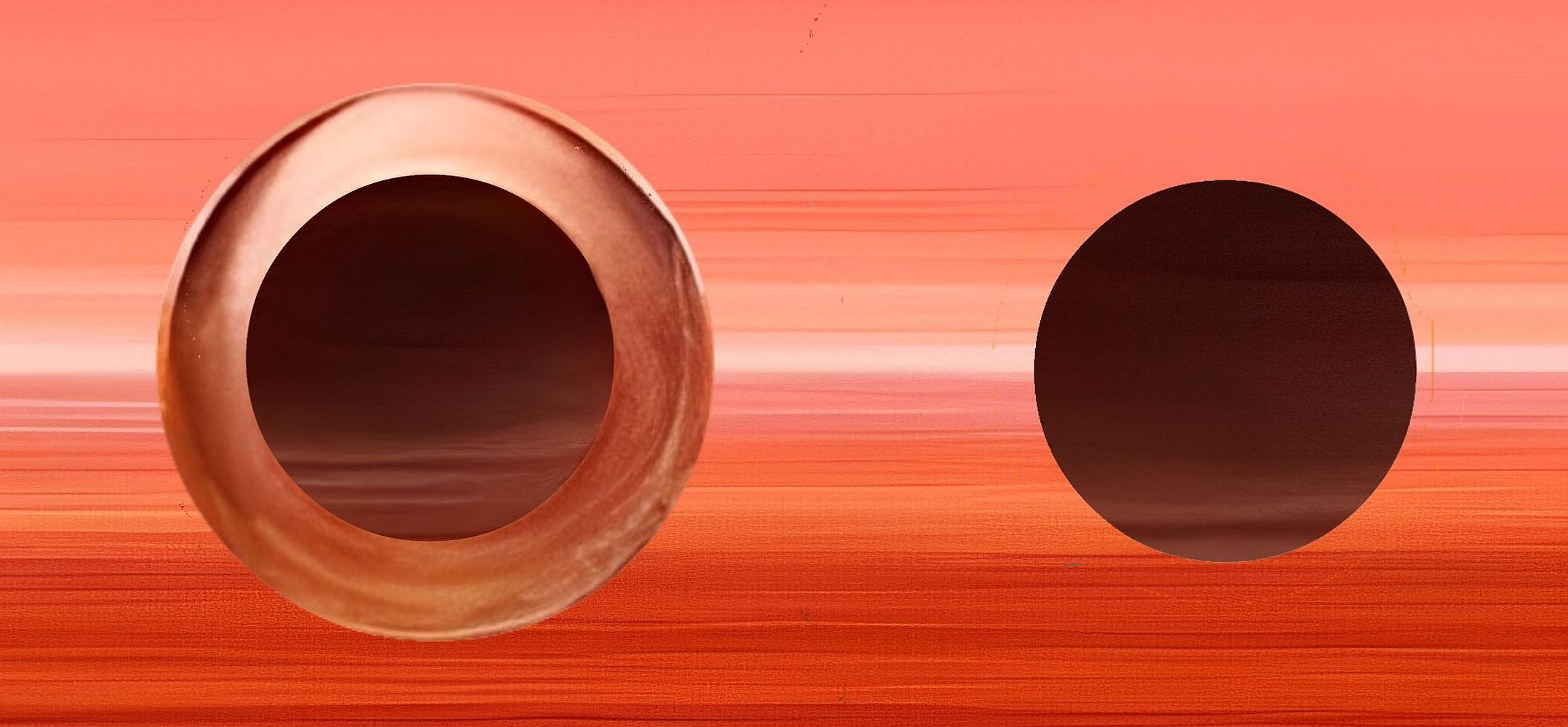
Countersunk tone hole with conical ring in comparison with a simple tone hole

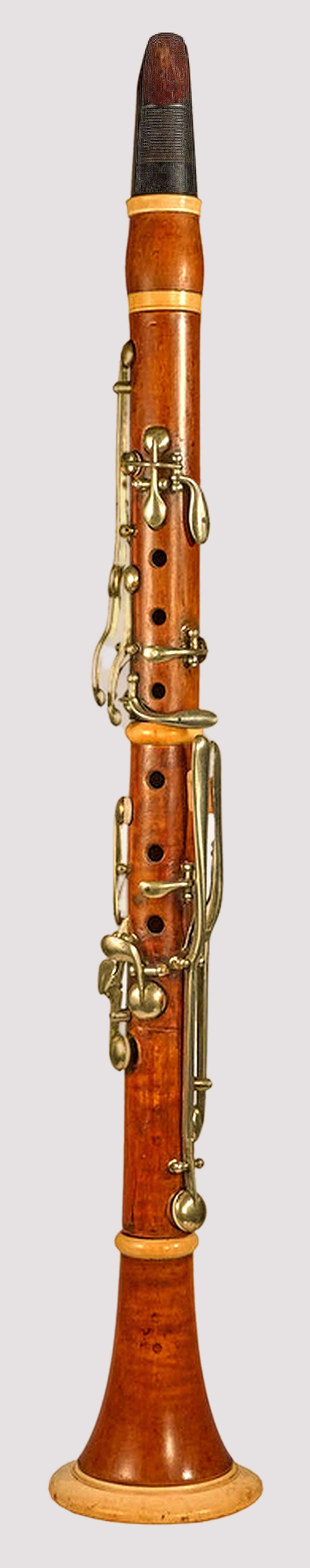
13-keyed clarinet by Iwan Müller

Müller was born in Reval (present-day Tallinn), at that time a city with a strong Baltic German community in the Governorate of Estonia, part of the Russian Empire. He became a chamber musician in Saint Petersburg before he was twenty. At the same time, he was constantly striving to improve the clarinet, with new types of keywork. At the time, the standard clarinet used flat brass plates covered in soft leather to cover the toneholes. Since these leaked air, the number of them had to be kept to a minimum, which meant that notes outside the main scale of the clarinet (accidentals) had to be obtained by complicated fingerings which were difficult to play quickly and rarely were in tune. Clarinets would have five or six keys, the bare minimum to obtain an acceptable chromatic scale.

Müller's solution was the stuffed pad, originally made of kid leather stuffed with felt. These pads would "bulge", such that in combination with countersunk tone holes (called Zwirl or twist or twister), would close the keyholes sufficiently tight to permit the use of an increased number of keys making the "clarinette omnitonique" possible.

In addition to the fingering system and felt pads, Müller is also known as the inventor of metal ligature (that replaced twine, string and wire, widely used in the past and still used today in German-speaking regions), which are used today in almost all single-reeded woodwind instruments.

Müller went on to work in Dresden, Berlin and Leipzig, where he specialized in the basset-horn, a type of low-pitched clarinet.

In 1809 Müller performed to great acclaim on a clarinet made to his own specifications. In that same year, Müller moved to Paris, gained the support of a wealthy patron, (Mr.) Marie-Pierre Petit, and started mass-producing clarinets.

In 1812 Müller presented his new 13-key clarinet with air-tight pads to the Paris Conservatoire, but they weren't impressed. Nevertheless, Müller's new clarinet with fully chromatic range became popular and became the standard clarinet for much of the 19th century. It was further developed into the Öhler system, the prevalent system in Germany today. He was also, before the famous Hyacinthe Klosé, principal clarinet at the Théâtre Italien in Paris.

== Sources ==
- "Мюллер, Иван (композитор)" . Brockhaus and Efron Encyclopedic Dictionary (in Russian). 1906.
- Weston, Pamela (2001). "Müller, Iwan". Grove Art Online.
- Pamela Weston, Clarinet Virtuosi of the Past, ISBN 0-7091-2442-2, ISBN 0-9506209-8-X
