= List of clarinet makers =

The following are lists of makers of clarinets, clarinet mouthpieces, clarinet ligatures, and clarinet reeds. Some of the following are simply brands for instruments from original equipment manufacturers.

== Companies by specialty ==
=== Clarinets ===
Brand	Piccolo	Sopranino	Soprano	Basset clarinet	Basset horn	Alto	Bass	Contra-alto	Contrabass
Amati Kraslice		E♭	C, B♭, A, G			E♭	B♭		
Backun Musical Services			B♭, A	A (also joints in A)			B♭		
E. K. Blessing			B♭						
Buffet Crampon		E♭, D	C, B♭, A	A	F	E♭	B♭	EE♭	
Benedikt Eppelsheim									BB♭
Dietz Klarinettenbau	G	E♭, D	C, B♭, A, G	B♭, A	F	E♭	B♭		
Foag Klarinetten	A♭, G	E♭, D	C, B♭, A, G	B♭, A	F	E♭	B♭	EE♭	BB♭, BBB♭ octocontrabass
Stephen Fox		E♭, D	C, B♭, A, G	C, B♭, A, G (also joints and joint conversions in C, B♭, A)	F		B♭, A (projected)		
Hanson Clarinet Company			B♭, A						
Howarth of London			B♭, A	A (joints & barrels only)					
Jupiter Band Instruments			B♭				B♭		
Leblanc (a division of The Selmer Company)			B♭			E♭	B♭	EE♭	BB♭
Leitner & Kraus		E♭, D	C, B♭, A	B♭, A	F, E♭		B♭		
Moe Custom Clarinets		E♭	B♭, A						
Orsi Instrument Company	G, A♭ (on request)	E♭	C, B♭, A, G		F (on request)	E♭	B♭		
Fratelli Patricola		E♭	C, B♭, A						
L. A. Ripamonti	A♭	E♭	C, B♭, A				B♭		BB♭
Luis Rossi		D	C, B♭, A						
W. Schreiber (division of Buffet Crampon Germany)			C, B♭, A						
Schwenk & Seggelke	G, A♭	E♭, D	C, B♭, A	B♭, A	F				
Selmer		E♭	B♭, A		F	E♭	B♭	EE♭	BB♭
F. Arthur Uebel		E♭	C, B♭, A	A			B♭;		
Herbert Wurlitzer	G	E♭, D	C, B♭, A	B♭, A	F	E♭	B♭		
Yamaha Corporation		E♭	B♭, A			E♭	B♭		

=== Mouthpieces ===
- Amati-Denak
- AW-Reeds GbR
- jj Babbitt
- Backun Mucical Services
- D'addario
- Clarke W. Fobes
- Leblanc
- Leitner & Kraus
- Selmer
- Vandoren
- Yamaha Corporation

=== Reeds ===
- AW-Reeds GbR
- D'addario
- Rico
- Vandoren

=== Ligatures ===
- Leblanc
- Vandoren
- Yamaha Corporation

=== Historical reproductions ===
- Stephen Fox
- Schwenk & Seggelke
