= Janet Ritterman =

Dame Janet Elizabeth Ritterman DBE FRSA (born 1 December 1941) is the Australian-educated former Director of the Royal College of Music in London, from 1993 to 2005.

Ritterman was educated at North Sydney Girls High School, the New South Wales State Conservatorium of Music (now Sydney Conservatorium of Music, part of the University of Sydney), the University of Durham, and King's College, London. She held academic positions in England from 1975 when she was Senior Lecturer in Music at the Middlesex Polytechnic (to 1979). Ritterman became the third Chancellor of Middlesex University on 3 July 2013.

Ritterman was appointed Dame Commander of the Order of the British Empire (DBE) for services to music in the 2002 Birthday Honours list, see 2002 Birthday Honours and List.

Cultural offices
Preceded by Michael Gough Matthews	Director of the Royal College of Music; 1993–2005	Succeeded by Colin Lawson
