= Basset clarinet =

Woodwind musical instrument

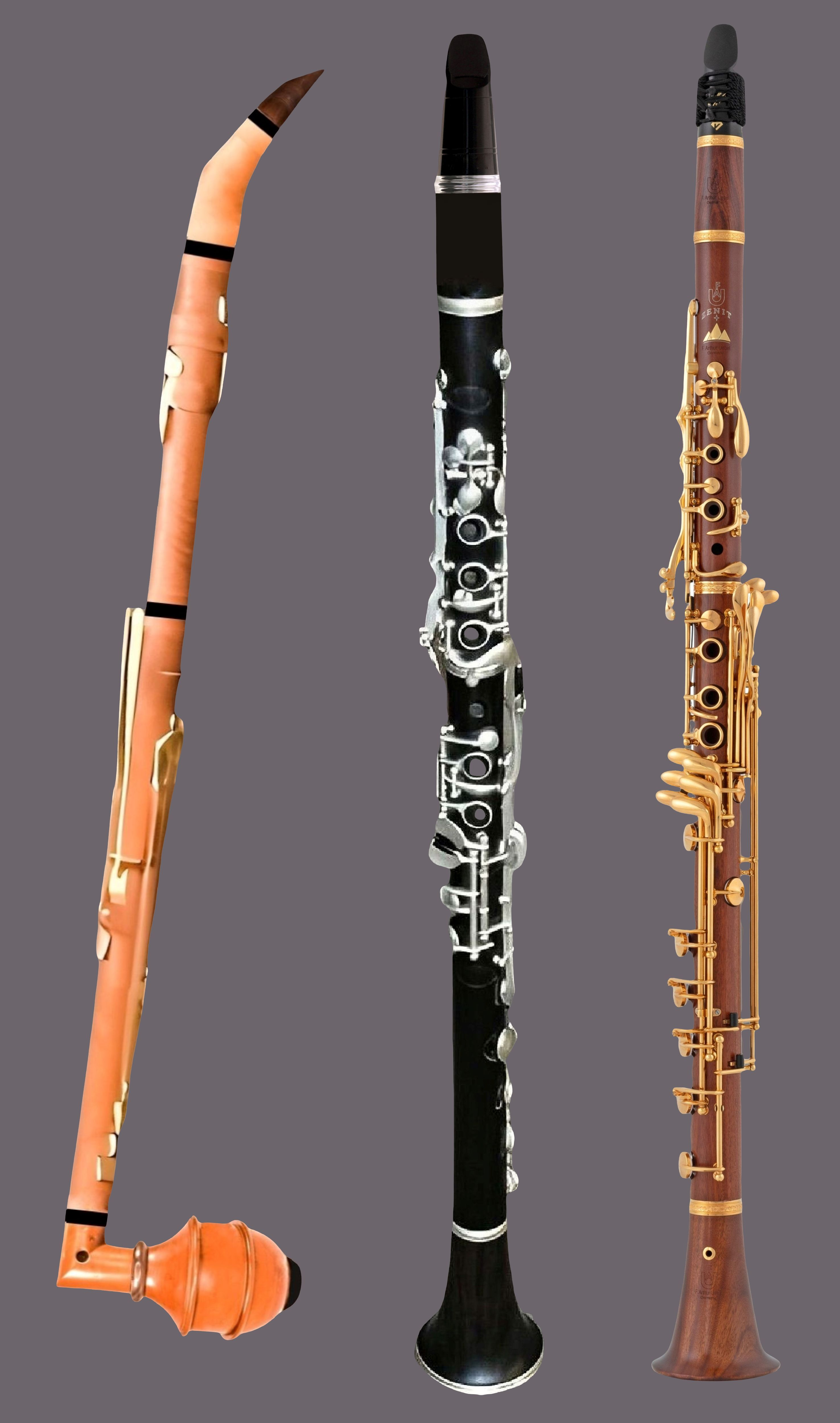
- Basset clarinet after Anton Stadler (replica), 1st modern basset clar. (1900–1950) German system, Basset clar. French System

Woodwind musical instrument
- Other names: German: Bassettklarinette, French: clarinette de basset; Italian: clarinetto di bassetto;
- Classification: Aerophon, clarinet-family
- Inventor(s): Theodor Lotz and others
- Developed: around 1770

Playing range
- basset clarinet in A written: C3-C7, sounding a minor third lower: A2-A6

Related instruments
- clarinet, clarinet d'amore, alto clarinet, basset horn

Musicians
- Sabine Meyer, Charles Neidich, Vlad Weverbergh, Sharon Kam, Martin Fröst, Shirley Brill

Builders
- Leitner & Kraus (instrument top), Schwenk & Seggelke (instruments in the middle and below), Buffet Crampon, Backun Musical Services, Stephan Fox, FAU, Wurlitzer, Gerold-Clarinets

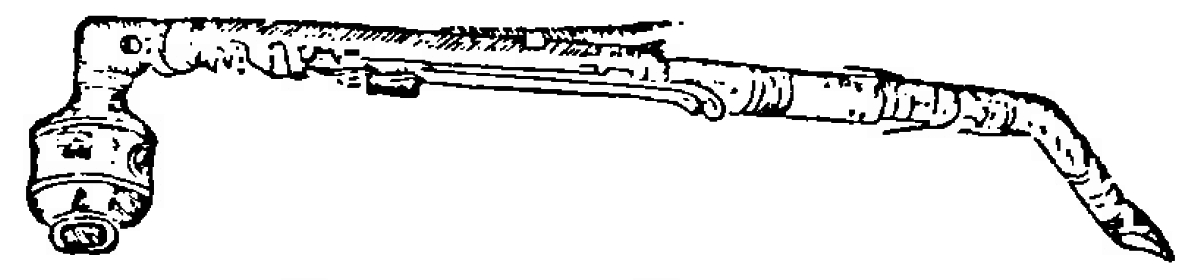
Sketch of the basset clarinet by Anton Stadler 1794

The basset clarinet is a member of the clarinet family similar to the usual soprano clarinet but longer and with additional keys to enable playing several additional lower notes. Typically a basset clarinet has keywork going to a low (written) C or B, as opposed to the standard clarinet's E or E♭. The basset clarinet is most commonly a transposing instrument in A, although basset clarinets in C and B♭ and very seldom in G also exist. The similarly named basset horn is also a clarinet with extended lower range, but is in a lower pitch (typically F); the basset horn predates, and undoubtedly inspired, the basset clarinet.

== History ==
The earliest surviving instruments in Paris and London museums date from 1770. The basset clarinet was most notably associated with the clarinet virtuoso Anton Stadler (1753–1812), a contemporary and good friend of Mozart. The instrument used by Stadler was invented and built by the Vienna K.K. court instrument maker Theodor Lotz around 1788. It has long been unclear how this instrument might have looked. In a library in Riga in 1992 programmes were found of concerts which Anton Stadler played there in 1794. Two of those programmes show an engraving of Stadler's instrument (see picture on the right). The term "basset clarinet" was in use by 1796, though it may originally have referred to the basset horn.

Mozart wrote his Clarinet Quintet in A major, K.581 and Clarinet Concerto in A Major, K.622 for this instrument; the concerto is partly based on an earlier fragment of a Concerto for Basset Horn in G, K.584b. In his penultimate opera La clemenza di Tito, Mozart assigned a basset clarinet in B♭ in the aria Parto parto, ma tu ben mio, meco ritorna in pace by Sesto (mezzo-soprano) an outstanding solo role in an approximately 8-minute dialogue with the singer, the musical climax of this act, if not the whole opera.

Because Mozart's clarinet concerto is so important, the basset clarinet is quite an interesting instrument in spite of its small applicability. For the concerto the extension must be chromatic and the shape of the Viennese basset horn is not suitable for this. On period instruments following the Riga design a low B may be obtained by closing a keyless hole on the "L" joint with the knee or thigh. Editions demonstrating and advocating the use of this note in the Clarinet Concerto KV 622 and Quintet KV 581 have been published by Craig Hill.

Despite Stadler's advocacy the instrument did not become a regular member of the orchestra. During the 19th and early 20th centuries only a few basset clarinets were produced, for performances of Mozart pieces, and no further music was written for the instrument (see under External links: Mozarts's lost clarinet). However, beginning in the mid 20th century, interest in performing on original instruments prompted the basset clarinet's revival. A few modern composers, among them Thomas Adès, Bill Sweeney, Harrison Birtwistle, Alan Hacker, Hannes Pohlit and Franklin Stover, have written works featuring basset clarinet; Joan Tower's 1988 Clarinet Concerto is written to be played on either basset or standard clarinet.

== Construction ==
The construction of a modern basset clarinet can be rectilinear, like a normal clarinet (see the two photos below right). However, the clarinet can have a bell, which is slightly upwards and forwards aligned via an angled intermediate piece (see photo above in the infobox). Charles Neidich has had a basset clarinet with modern mechanics built by Schwenk & Seggelke, which, like the Stadler clarinet, has an angled barrel and as a bell has a Liebesfuß, which he turns backwards, although one can turn it forward. The different types and directions of the bell have an influence on the sound.

== Fingering of the basset notes ==
A basset clarinet is most commonly an A-clarinet with an extension of a major third or perfect fourth down. In the case of historical instruments as well as those of the German system, the additional deep tones C, C♯, D and E♭ are fingered with the right thumb, likewise in the case of instruments of the French system made by German manufacturers (e.g. Herbert Wurlitzer and Leitner & Kraus). On the other hand, the basset clarinets of the French system of other manufacturers are equipped with two additional pushers for the small right finger for the notes D and E♭ as well as two thumb pushers for the notes C and C♯ (standard). The German manufacturer Schwenk & Seggelke offers a choice of both tuners for the French system and, as additional to the standard a pusher for the small left finger for the note D, which can then be fingered twice, see the photos below. On instruments by the Canadian manufacturer Stephen Fox, D is also pressed with the small left finger and, if available, the low B (big octave) with the small right finger, while the three other basset notes are pressed with the right thumb, see description and illustration. In 2021 the German manufacturer F. Arthur Uebel, together with the American clarinettist Ricardo Morales, developed a new Boehm basset clarinet in which the two additional pushers for the little finger on the right are not, as usual, for D and E♭, but for C♯ and E♭. For the D there is an additional pusher for the little finger on the left (as with Seggelke) and for the C a thumb key (the only one).

Particularly innovative in the German system are the four thumb pushers of the basset keys made by the Austrian manufacturer Gerold-Klarinetten, supplemented by a fifth pusher for improving the intonation of low F and E.

Fingerings of the basset tones German and French system

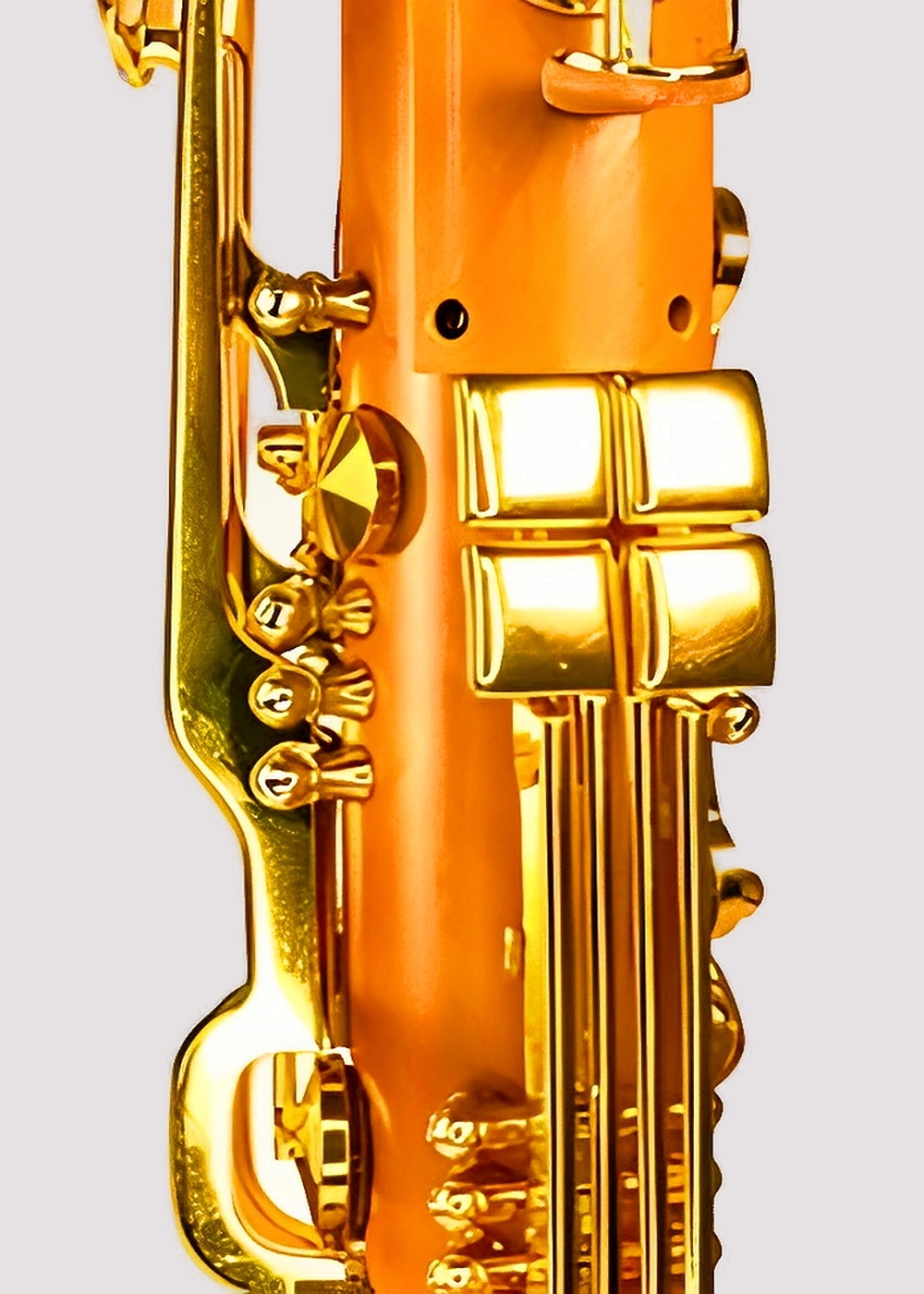
German system 4 keys (Seggelke clarinets)

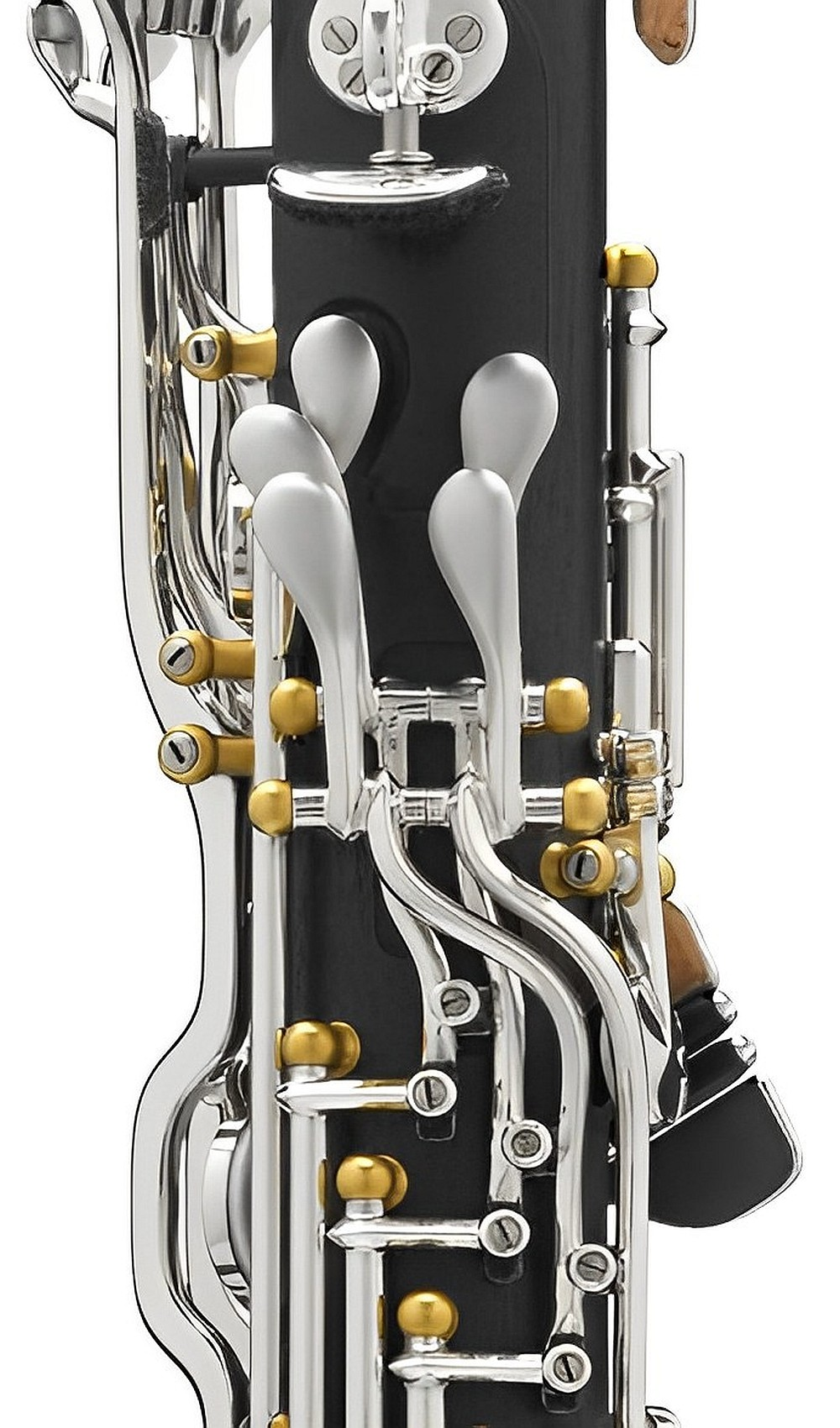
German system 5 keys (Gerold clarinets)

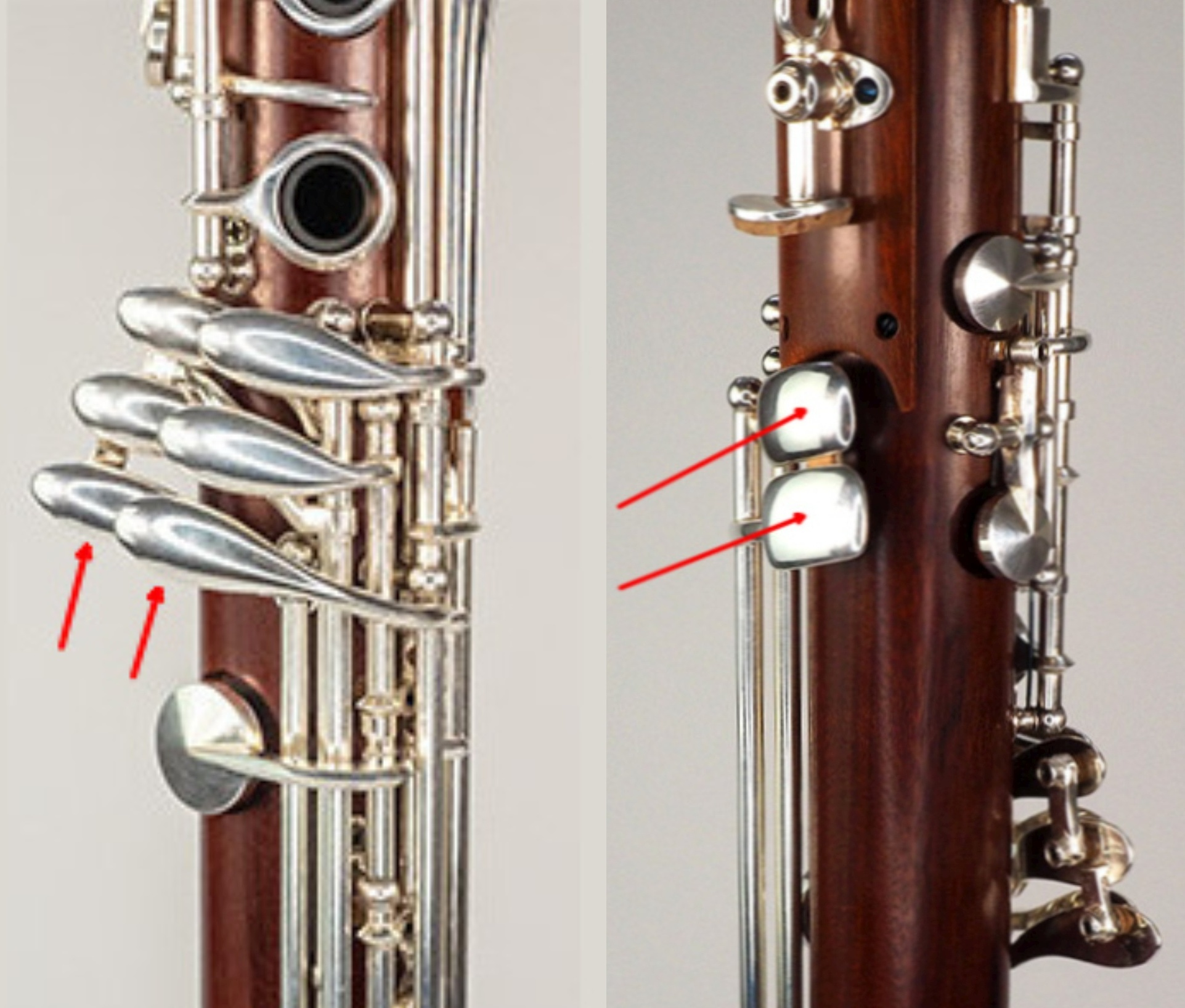
French system: 2 additional keys for the small finger on the right and 2 thumb keys (standard)

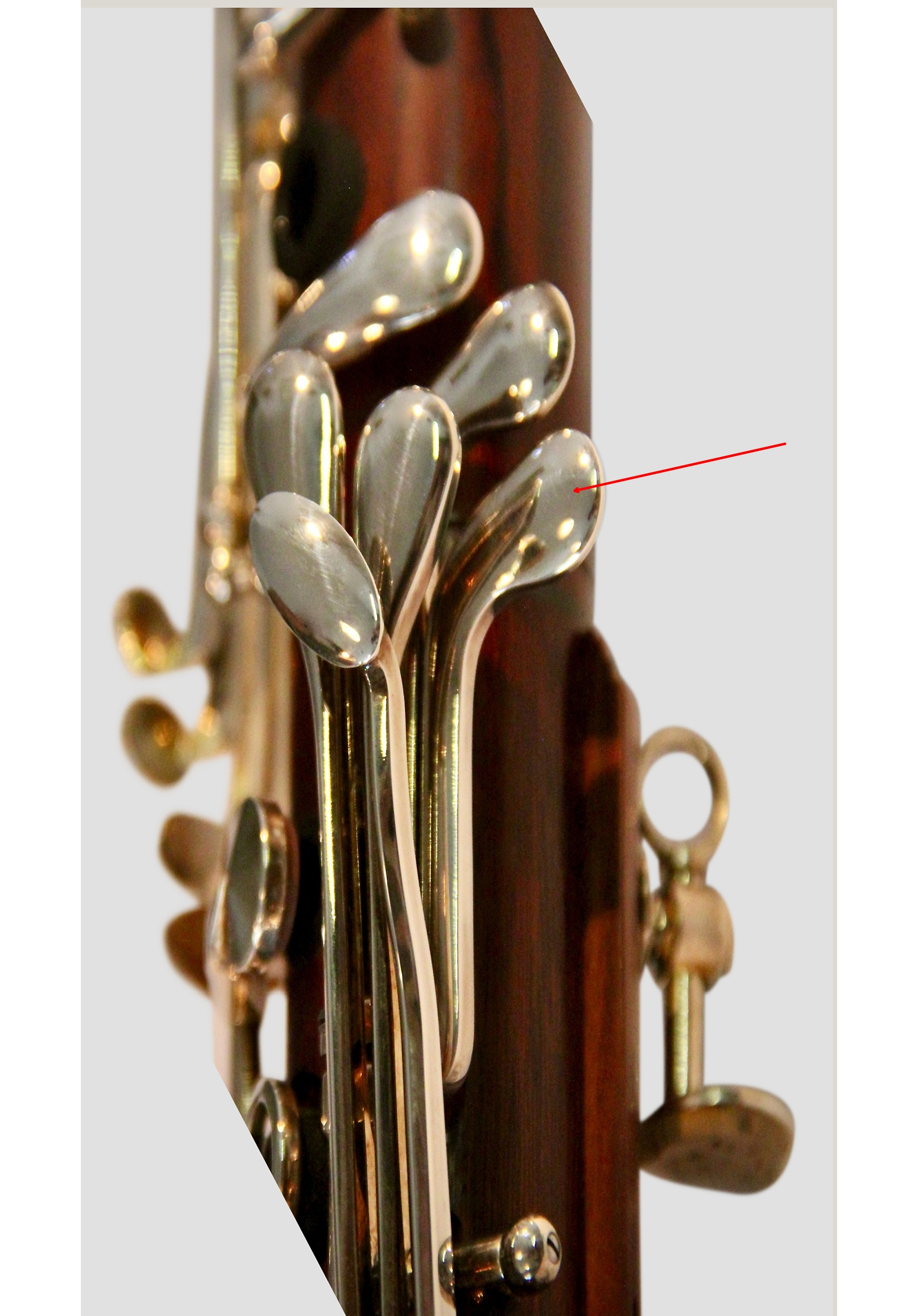
French: additional to standard a key for the small finger left (Seggelke)

== Compositions ==
From Mozart to the present there are hardly more than 60 compositions for this instrument. The most significant are the compositions already mentioned:

- W. A. Mozart: Quintet for basset clarinet, 2 violins, viola and cello in A major, K 581
- W. A. Mozart: Concerto for basset clarinet and orchestra in A major, K 622
- W. A. Mozart: Opera La Clemenza di Tito, No. 9, aria from Sesto “Parto, parto, ma tu ben mio”, for mezzo-soprano, basset clarinet in B♭ obbligato and orchestra.

Most of the other compositions were created after 1950. Compositions include:

- Concerti with solo basset clarinet: amongst others by Joan Tower (born 1938 US), Manfred Trojahn (born 1949 Germany), Helmut Eisel (born 1955 Germany), Shigeru Kan-no (born 1959 Japan), and Wim Henderickx (1962–2022 Netherlands) Basset Clarinet Concerto 'SUTRA', World premiere on March 31, 2021 with Annelien Van Wauwe.
- Pieces for basset clarinet solo: amongst others by Michiko Kawagoe (Japan), Aribert Reimann (born 1936 Germany), Ondreij Sarek (Czech Republic), Christopher M. Wicks (born 1975, US).
- Duos with basset clarinet: amongst others by Harrison Birtwistle (born 1934 England), Istvan Bozicevik (Croatia), Erika Fox (born 1936 Austria / GB), Patrick Nunn (born 1969 GB), Meinrad Schmitt (born 1935, Germany), William Sweeney (born 1950 GB) and Gary Carpenter (born 1951 GB).
- Trios with basset clarinet: amongst others by François Devienne (1759–1803 France), Helmut Eisel (born 1955 Germany).
- Quintets with basset clarinet: amongst others by Harrison Birtwistle (born 1934 GB).
- Larger chamber music ensembles with basset clarinet: amongst others by Klaus Huber (1924–2017 Swiss).
- Orchestral music and operas with basset clarinet: amongst others by Thomas Adés (born 1971 GB), W. A. Mozart (1756–1791), opera "Cosi fan tutte" aria by Ferrando (No. 24) "Ah! Io veggio", and Ferdinando Paer (1771–1839 Italy), opera "Sargino" (1803), aria "Una voca al cor mi parla".

== Makers ==
Some clarinet makers now produce basset clarinets, or extended lower joints which will convert a standard clarinet to a basset clarinet. Among makers of basset clarinets using the French (Boehm) system are Buffet Crampon, Stephen Fox, and Backun Musical Services.

Some makers of both French and German (Oehler) systems: Herbert Wurlitzer, Schwenk & Seggelke and Leitner & Kraus. A maker of the German system only: Hüyng. Makers of basset lower joints include Fox.

== Performers ==
Classical clarinetists who have recorded albums using basset clarinet include Colin Lawson, David Shifrin, Antony Pay, Sabine Meyer, Richard Haynes and Kari Kriikku. Also Martin Fröst, Sharon Kam, Shirley Brill, Annelien Van Wauwe and Sebastian Manz play the Mozart-concerto on a basset clarinet. The German clarinetist Theo Jörgensmann played free jazz on a basset clarinet as does Los Angeles based performer Vinny Golia (who also uses the basset horn in his music). The British clarinetist Thea King recorded Mozart's Quintet and Concerto, both on the basset clarinet, for Hyperion Records, coupled together on one CD. Michael Collins, who studied with Thea King, has recorded the Mozart Concerto playing a basset clarinet (Deutsche Grammophon, along with a transcription for clarinet of Beethoven's Violin Concerto). With the North Carolina Symphony on April 10, 2008, Collins premiered Elena Kats-Chernin's Ornamental Air, which takes the form of a concerto for basset clarinet. Another British player, Joy Farrall, has also recorded Mozart's Concerto and Quintet (BMG and Meridian) using a basset clarinet, alongside the Kegelstatt Trio for clarinet, viola and piano. On period instruments, Jane Booth has recorded the Mozart Quintet with the Eybler Quartet (Analekta, 2010). Working in both practice and theory, Colin Lawson's celebrated recording of Mozart's Clarinet Concerto K. 622 with the Hanover Band for Nimbus, released in 1990, complements his Cambridge Handbook to Mozart’s Clarinet Concerto published in 1996.

The American clarinetist Charles Neidich, the Italian Luca Lucchetta, the Belgian Vlad Weverbergh and the Swedish Stefan Harg, all committed to historical performance practice, play Mozart on replicas of Stadler's basset clarinet. Also in performances of Mozart's La clemenza di Tito, Sesto's aria "Parto, ma tu ben mio" increasingly uses the prescribed prominent basset clarinet in B♭ instead of a normal clarinet, as well as in concert performances of this aria at the performances of the 2017 Opera in Salzburg and 2018 in Amsterdam with the German clarinetist Florian Schuele. Australian clarinetist Richard Haynes performs on a basset clarinet d'amore (see clarinet d'amore) in G and commissions new solo and chamber works for this instrument.

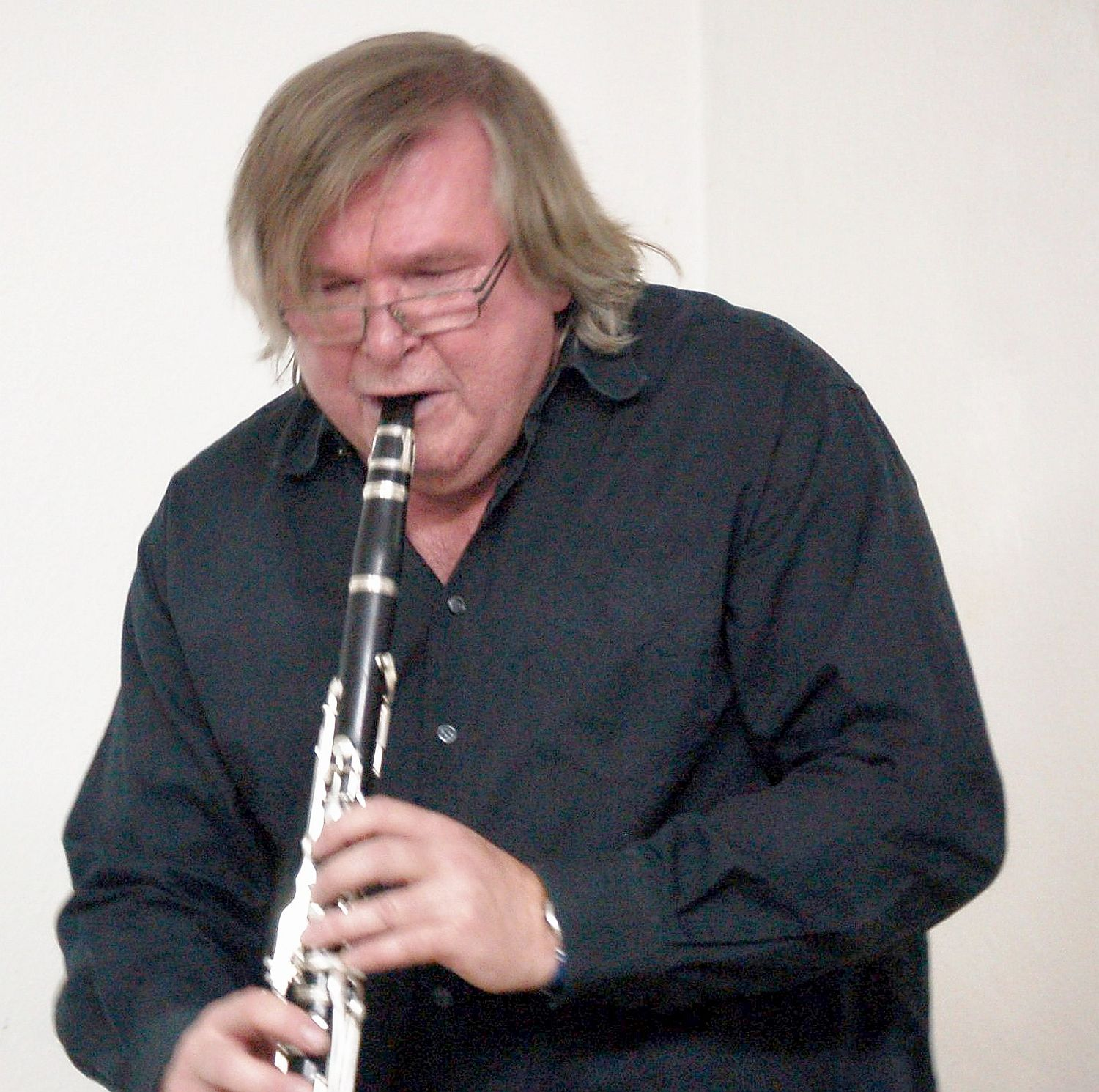
Theo Jörgensmann

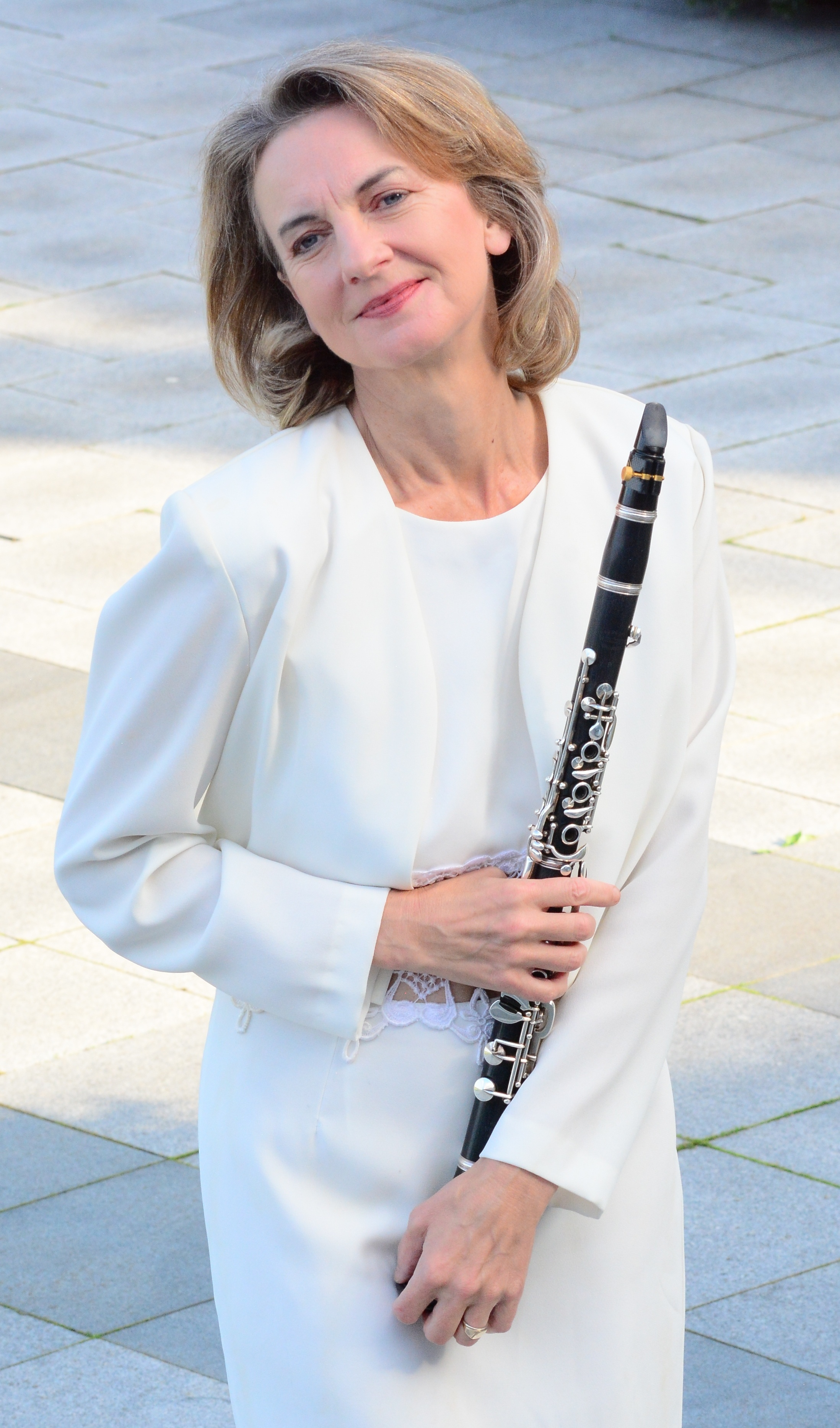
Sabine Meyer

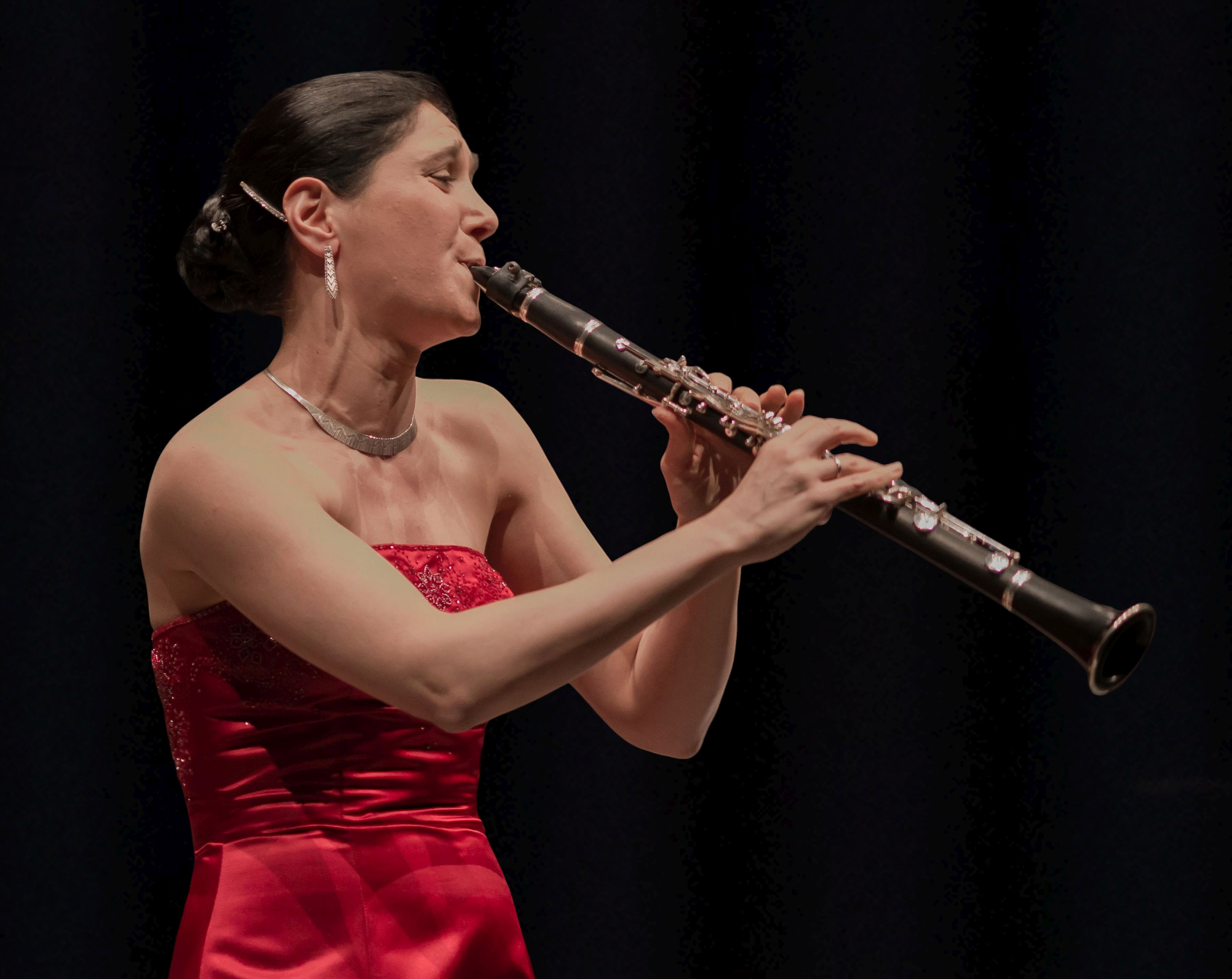
Sharon Kam

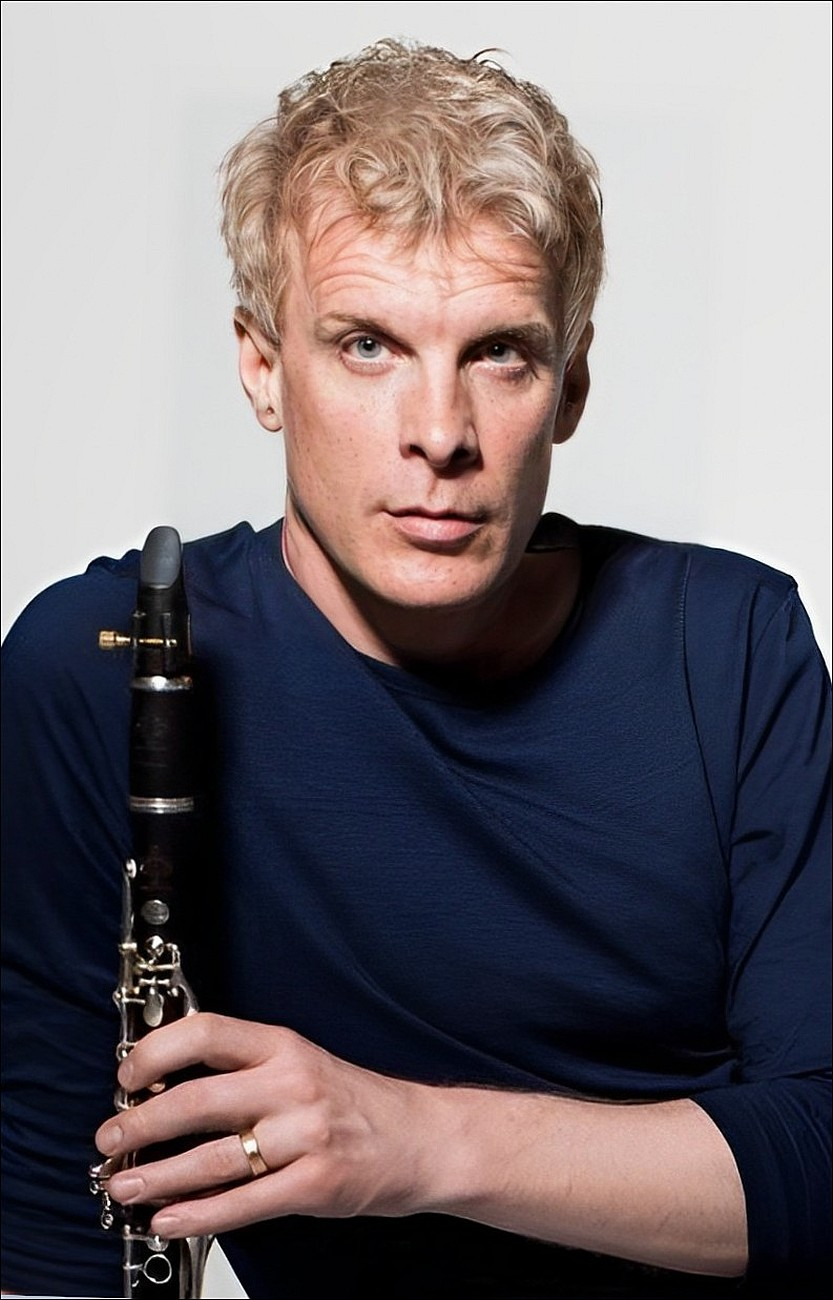
Martin Fröst

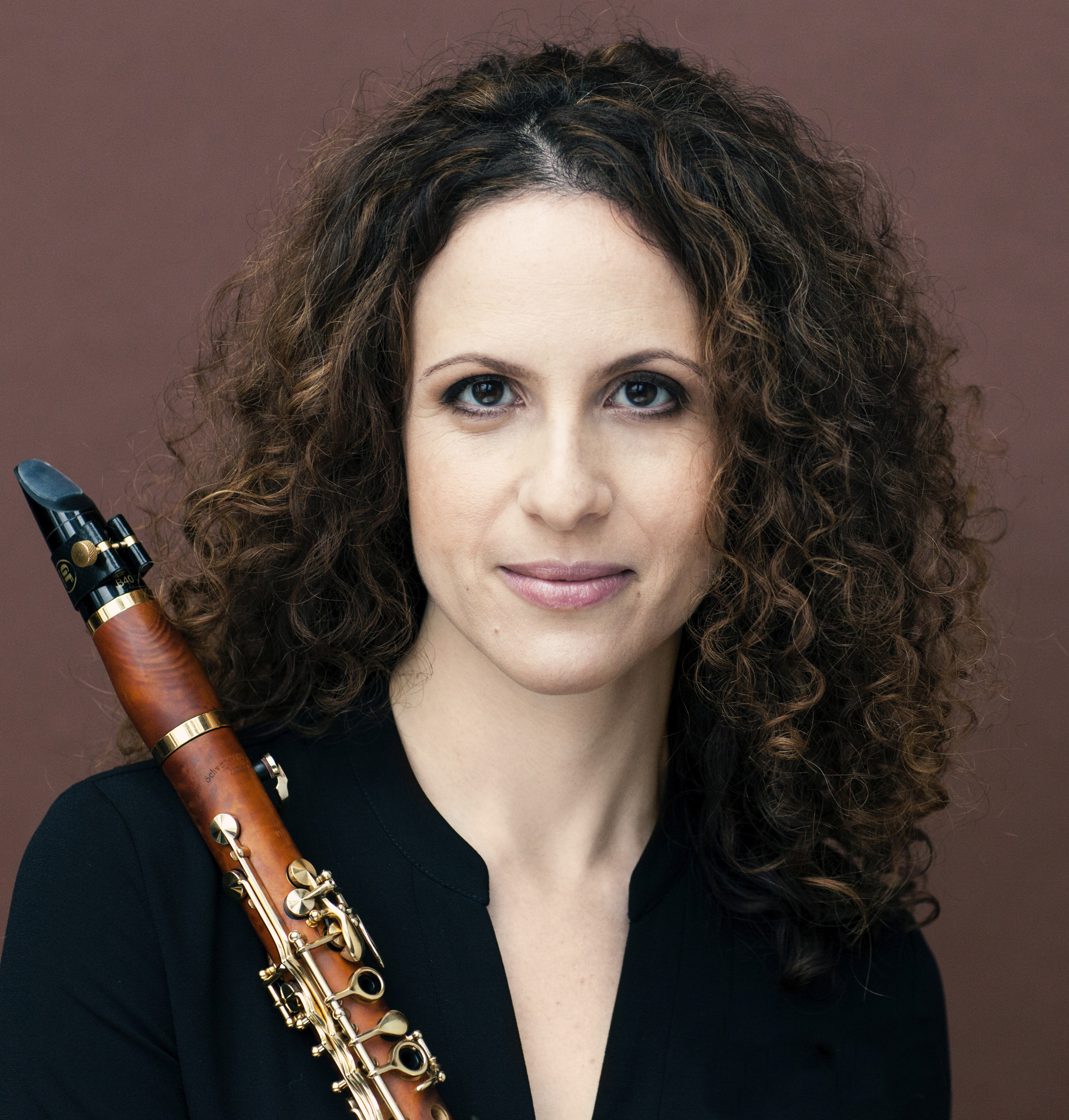
Shirley Brill

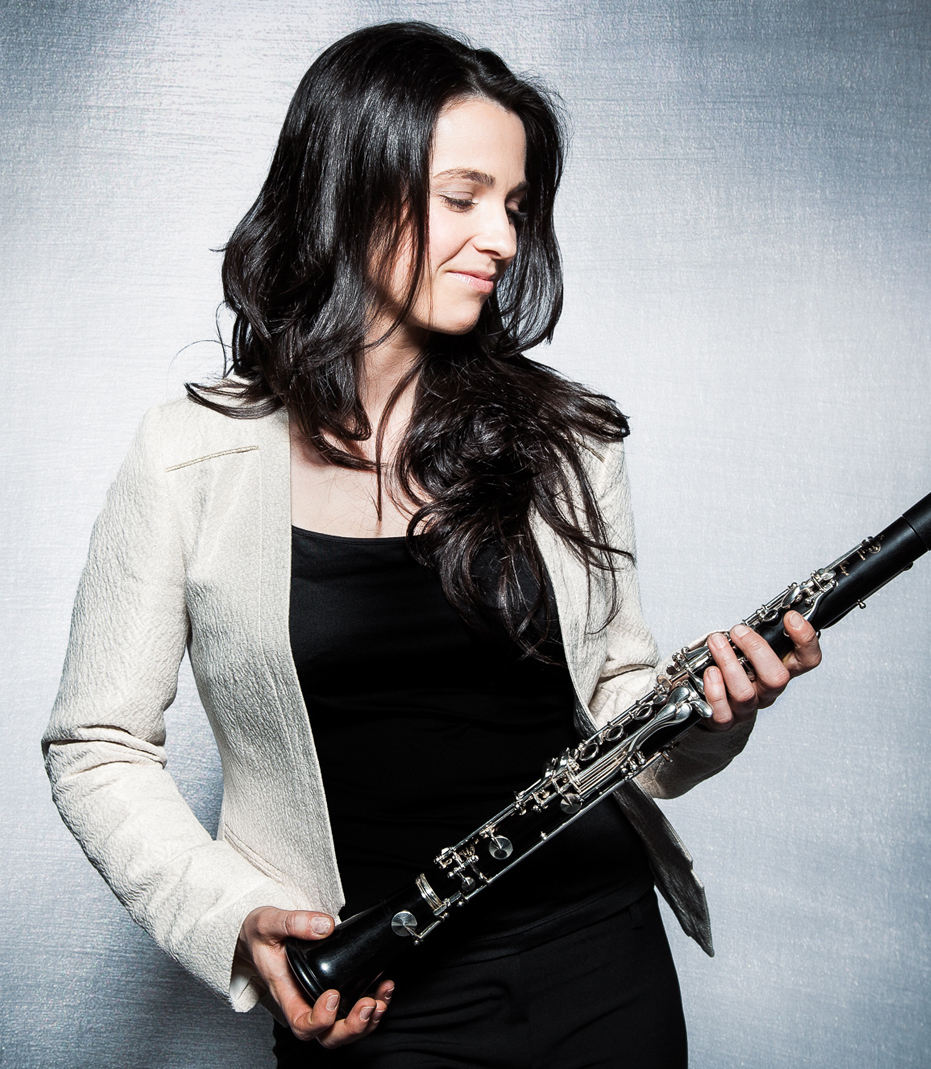
Annelien Van Wauwe

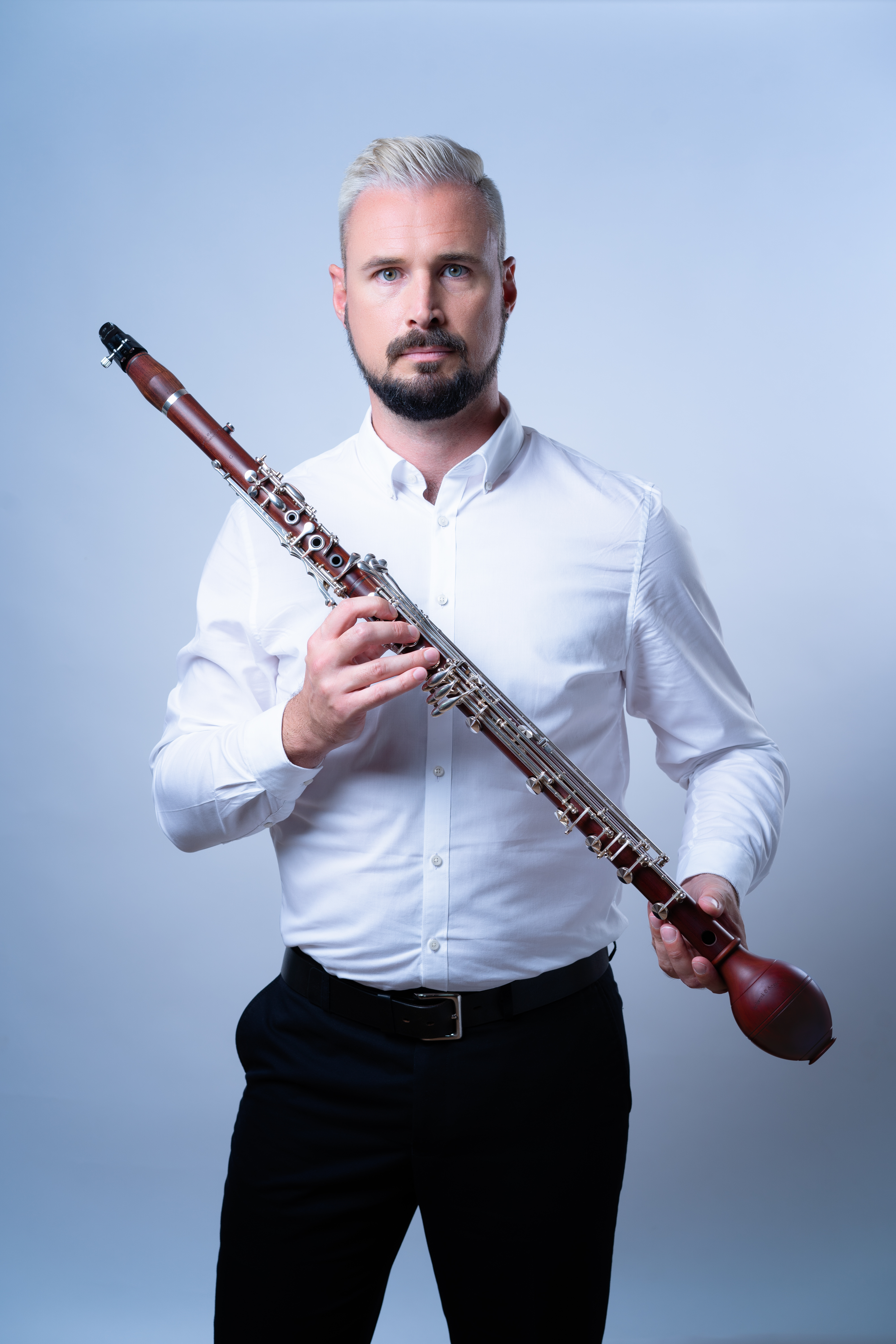
Richard Haynes

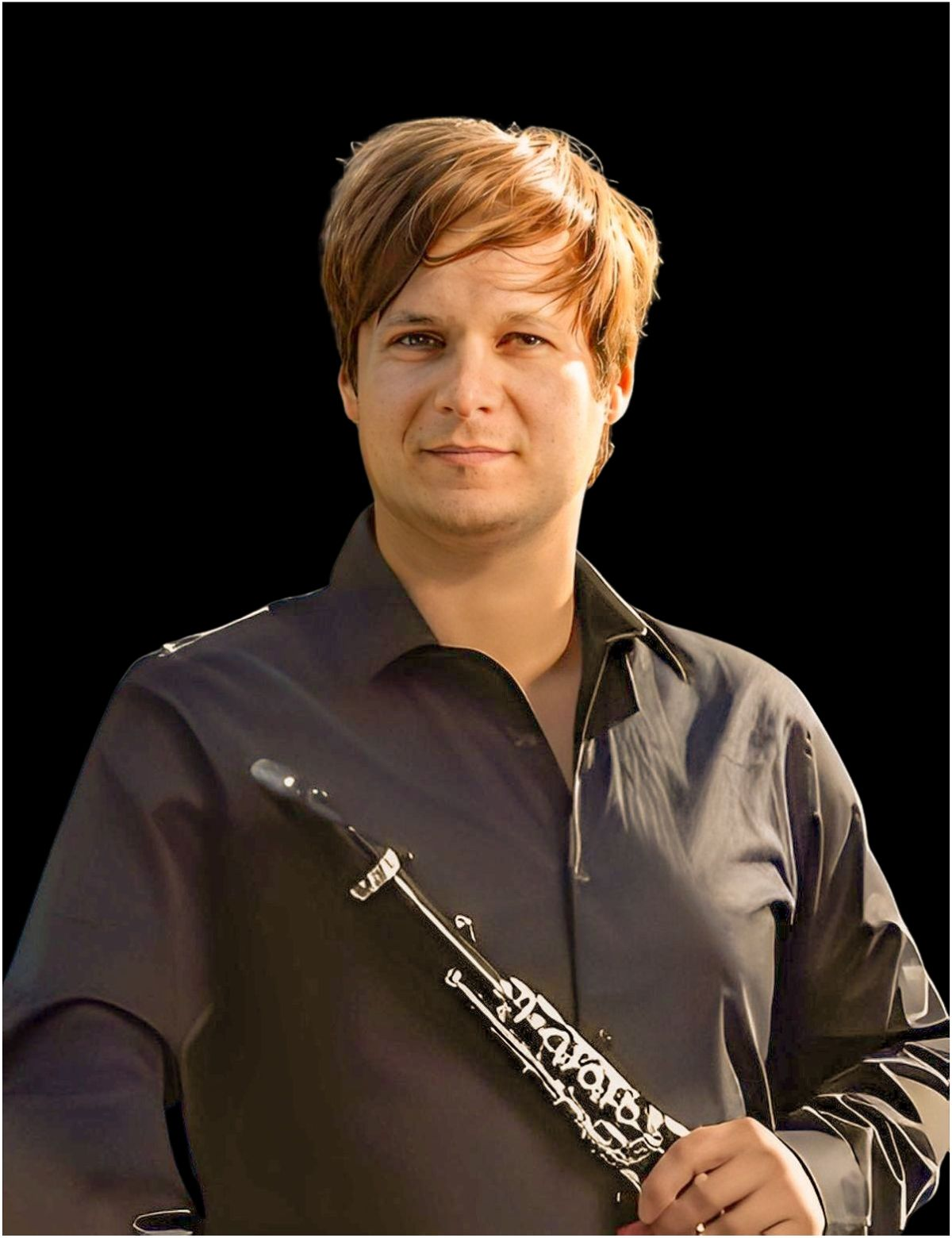
Sebastian Manz
