= Stephen Fox (clarinet maker) =

British clarinetist, saxophonist and clarinet maker

Stephen Fox is a British clarinetist, saxophonist and clarinet maker, based in Richmond Hill, Ontario, Canada.

Born in England, Fox completed a master's degree in physics at the University of Saskatchewan before earning a degree in clarinet performance. He began a career in instrument repair in 1985 and started making clarinets in 1990. Fox makes modern soprano, basset, and bass clarinets, and basset horns. In addition he makes tárogatós, and is one of only a handful of makers of reproduction historical clarinets in the world. In 2006 he introduced the world's first Bohlen-Pierce clarinets. Fox clarinets are played by Toronto Symphony Orchestra principal clarinetist Joaquin Valdepenas, Canadian big band leader Don Pierre, klezmer artist Kurt Bjorling of the band Brave Old World, Norwegian clarinetist Terje Lerstad, Binghamton University music professor Timothy Perry, Swiss multi-instrumentalist Peter A. Schmid, and many others in Europe, Japan, the United States, and Canada. Fox also teaches musical instrument making at the Musikk Instrument Akademiet in Norway. As an instrumentalist, Fox performs and records with the chamber music groups Riverdale Ensemble and Ossia.
