= A-flat clarinet =

Smallest piccolo clarinet still in current use

A♭ clarinet
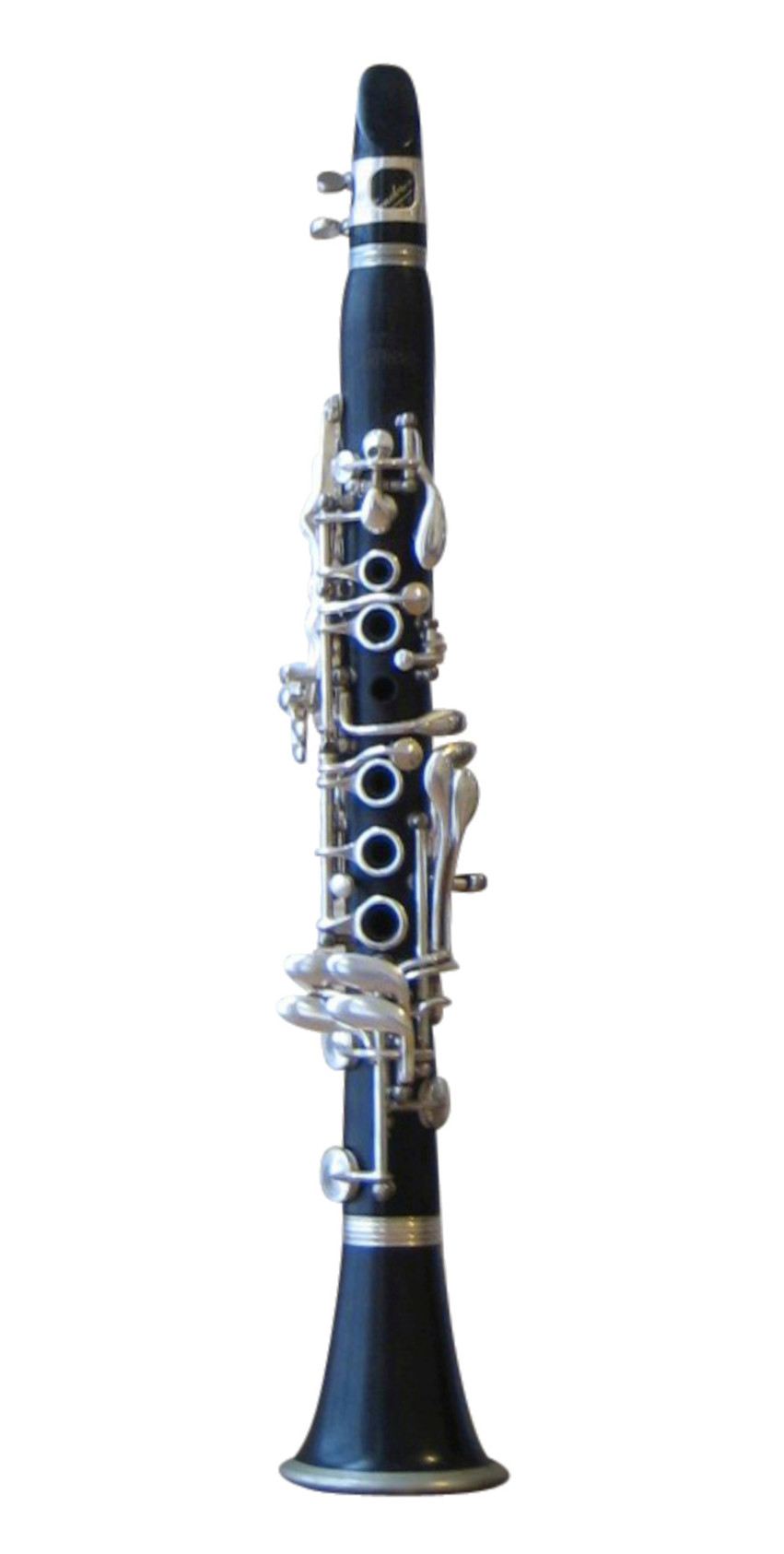

Woodwind instrument
- Classification: Wind → Woodwind → Single-reed
- Hornbostel–Sachs classification: 422.211.2–71 (Single-reeded aerophone with keys)

Playing range
- The written range E_{3}–G_{6} sounds a minor sixth higher, C_{4}–E♭_{7}

Related instruments
- B♭ clarinet; E♭ clarinet; Hot fountain pen; Soprillo; Tárogató

Musicians
- Clarinetists

Builders
- Dietz Klarinettenbau (in G only); Foag Klarinetten; Herbert Wurlitzer; Mario Corso; Orsi; Ripamonti; Schwenk & Seggelke

Sound sample
- Béla Bartók, Scherzo (excerpt) A♭ clarinet played by Richard Haynes

More articles or information
- Clarinet family

The A-flat (A♭) clarinet is the highest-pitched instrument of the clarinet family still manufactured. It is just over half the length of the common B♭ clarinet and pitched a minor seventh higher, a perfect fourth higher than the E♭ clarinet. As a transposing instrument it sounds a minor sixth higher than written, thus the lowest written note E_{3} sounds as concert C_{4} (middle C). Around the beginning of the 19th century, several small clarinets in different pitches appeared. The A♭ clarinet was adopted in European wind bands, particularly in Italy where it has appeared in Verdi's opera banda parts and survived to the present day in military bands. It is sometimes called for in contemporary classical music, in works by composers Béla Bartók and John Tavener, and in large clarinet choir works. It is manufactured by Italian makers Ripamonti, Mario Corso, and Orsi, and in Germany by Dietz Klarinettenbau (in G), Foag Klarinetten, Herbert Wurlitzer, and Schwenk & Seggelke.

== History of small clarinets ==
The clarinets pitched higher than the C clarinet are frequently taken together as a group, variously known as the "sopranino" or "piccolo" (Shackleton, Lawson), "high" or "little" (Tschaikov), or "small" (Baines, Rice) clarinets. They are known as piccolo in Italian, petite in French, and kleine in German, which are all words for small.

The group contains clarinets built in several pitches, the largest being the sopranino clarinets in D and E♭, to the smallest in high A, B♭ and C, sometimes called octave clarinets, built an octave above the more common instruments in those keys. British organologist Albert Rice in his 2017 survey counted eleven pitches of high clarinets, but noted that while the D♭ soprano and sopraninos in E and G♭ are mentioned in literature and catalogs, no known instruments in these pitches exist in museums or private collections.

Of the three highest and smallest "octave" clarinets, the A and B♭ clarinets found some use in 19th century Prussian and Russian military bands. The smallest, in C, was probably experimental, only found with simplified key work due to the tight fingering required of an instrument only 28 centimetres (11 in) long. Above the E♭ sopranino clarinet and below the octave clarinets, this leaves three small clarinets, in F, G, and A♭.

The F clarinet was used mainly in military bands from around 1780 until the mid-19th century; French composer Hector Berlioz noted in his 1843 landmark Treatise on Instrumentation that it had been all but replaced by the E♭ clarinet. British composer and musicologist Cecil Forsyth in his 1914 orchestration treatise associated the high clarinets with Austria, saying "Clarinets in (high) F, and even in (high) A♭ are occasionally used abroad. The latter instrument is regularly employed in the Austrian military bands."

The G clarinet found some brief fame in Viennese small ensembles, particularly the Schrammelmusik of 1880s Vienna, where it gained the nickname picksüsses Hölzl, possibly Viennese slang for "fabulous matchstick". The music was originally performed by a quartet of two violins (the brothers Johann and Josef Schrammel), a contraguitar, and the G clarinet played by Georg Dänzer. It was first recorded by players of the Vienna Philharmonic, with principal clarinet Richard Schönhofer playing the high G clarinet, after the original parts were found in the 1960s.

The A♭ clarinet first appeared in the early 19th century and was adopted mainly by European wind bands. It survived in military bands, particularly in Spain and Italy at least through the middle of the 20th century. In Italy, particularly in band scores, the terms sestino and occasionally settimino referred to the A♭ clarinet, the pitch being a sixth or seventh above the C or B♭ clarinets, respectively. In some manuscripts, a clarinet with the term Alafà indicated the piccolo in A♭. It has found a niche in contemporary art music and clarinet choirs, and the A♭ and G clarinets are the only sizes of clarinet higher than the E♭ sopranino still manufactured.

== Construction ==
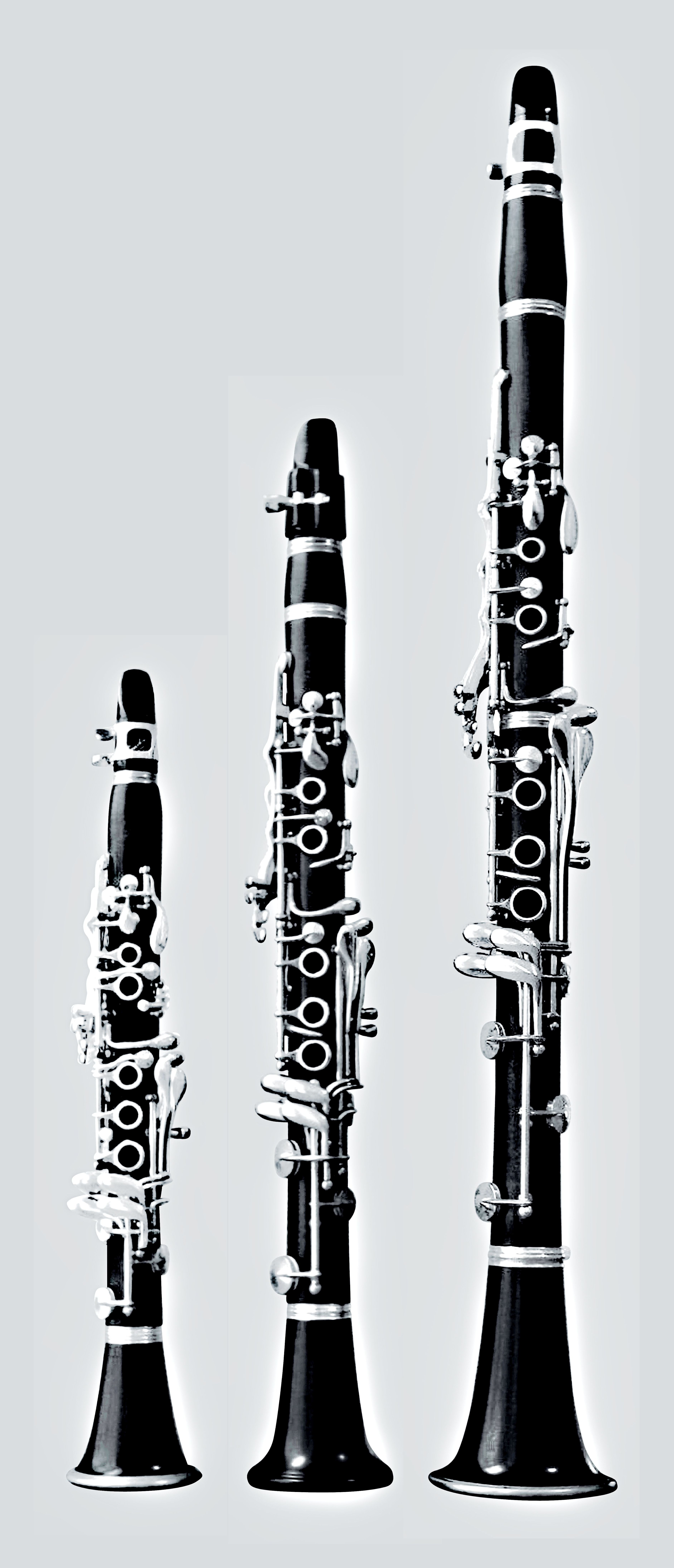
Size comparison, left to right: A♭, E♭, and B♭ clarinet

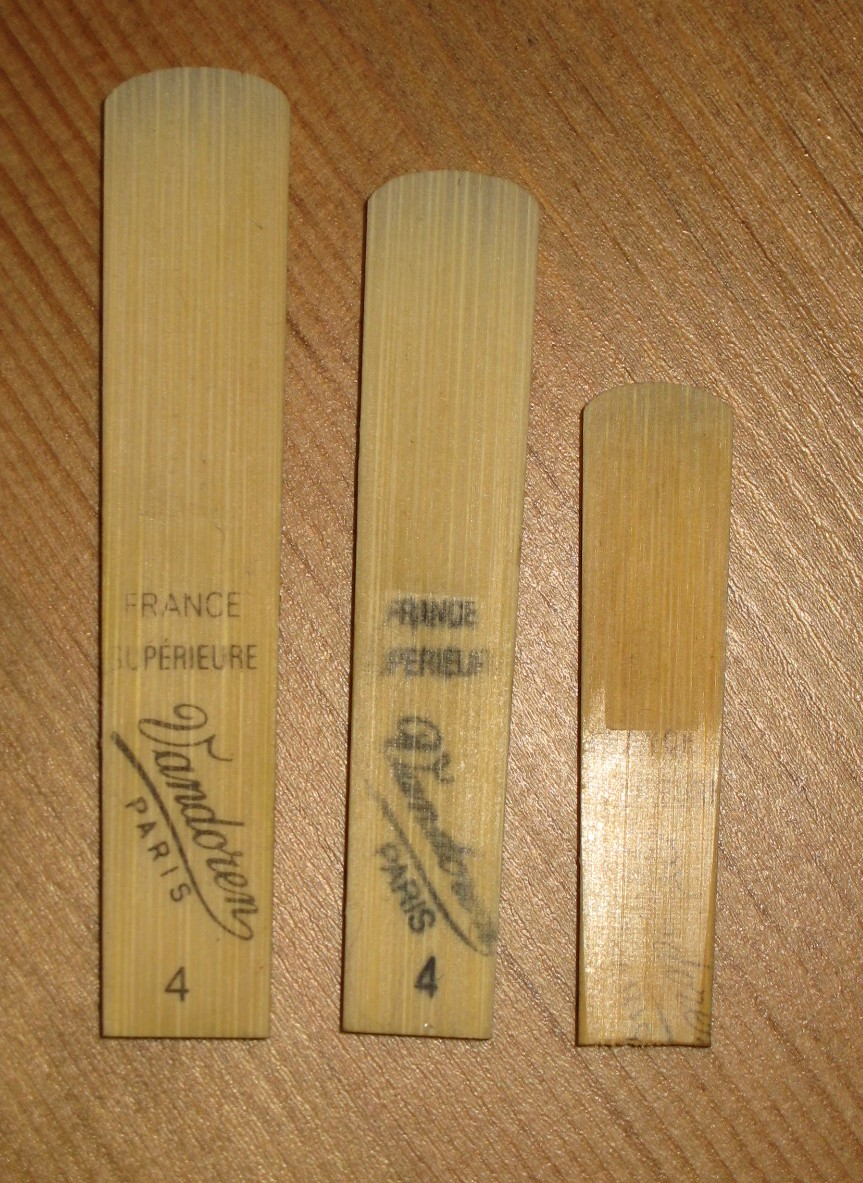
Reeds, left to right: B♭, E♭, and A♭ clarinet

The A♭ clarinet is just over half the length of the common B♭ clarinet, at around 360 millimetres (14 in) in length. Its small size requires more compact key work, and is usually constructed with a one-piece body that combines the separate upper and lower joints and the barrel found on larger clarinets. The bell and mouthpiece remain separate pieces.

Several manufacturers produce A♭ clarinets: Italian makers L. A. Ripamonti, Mario Corso, and Orsi, and in Germany, Foag Klarinetten, Herbert Wurlitzer, and Schwenk & Seggelke; German maker Dietz Klarinettenbau also produce a clarinet in G. French-American maker Leblanc made A♭ clarinets until at least the 1980s. Ripamonti, Foag, Wurlitzer and Schwenk & Seggelke produce A♭ clarinets with both German and French system key work, and the German makers also make German system G clarinets.

== Repertoire ==
The A♭ clarinet initially found its widest use in 19th century European wind and military band music. Italian opera composers wrote for the instrument in the banda (stage band) parts in their operas, for example Gaetano Donizetti's Alfredo il grande (1823), and Giuseppe Verdi's Ernani (1844), La traviata (1853), and Un ballo in maschera (1859).

The A♭ clarinet has appeared occasionally in 20th-century music. Béla Bartók wrote for it in his 1905 Scherzo for Piano and Orchestra op. 2 ("mostly in unison with the E♭ or piccolo [flute]"). Dutch composer Matthijs Vermeulen's Fourth Symphony, published in 1941, includes a part for A♭ clarinet, as does the 1969 A Celtic Requiem by English choral composer John Tavener. German avant-garde composer Hans-Joachim Hespos uses the A♭ clarinet in his 1972 large orchestral work, Interactions. Several of his chamber works also employ the A♭ clarinet; his 1978 work go also includes soprano sarrusophone, heckelphone, and tárogató. Canadian composer Samuel Andreyev includes A♭ "piccolo clarinet" in his chamber works Vérifications (2012) and Iridescent Notation (2017).

The A♭ clarinet is sometimes used in clarinet choir arrangements, including several by French-American composer Lucien Cailliet, though the instrument is often optional or cued in other voices.

== Bibliography ==
- Amore, Adriano (2018), I Clarinetti piccoli in Italia: Storia, tipologie, utilizzo e repertorio (in Italian), Turin: GEDI Gruppo Editoriale, OCLC 1124643607, Wikidata Q128213679
- Baines, Anthony (1977). Woodwind Instruments and their History (3rd ed.). New York: Dover Publications (published 1991). ISBN 978-0-486-26885-9. LCCN 91023745. OCLC 24010861. OL 1544645M. Wikidata Q115155619.
- Forsyth, Cecil (1914), Orchestration, London: Macmillan Publishers, LCCN a14002863, OCLC 408500, OL 177040M, Wikidata Q121879329
- Lawson, Colin (1995). "3. The clarinet family. Introduction: clarinets in B♭ and A". In Lawson, Colin (ed.). The Cambridge Companion to the Clarinet. Cambridge Companions. Cambridge University Press. p. 33–37. doi:10.1017/CCOL9780521470667. ISBN 978-1-139-00205-9. OL 1121104M. Wikidata Q116448371.
- Rendall, F. Geoffrey; Bate, Philip (1971). The Clarinet: Some notes upon its history and construction (3rd ed.). New York: W. W. Norton & Company. ISBN 978-0-510-36701-5. OCLC 343308. OL 5692406M. Wikidata Q115259125.
- Rice, Albert R. (March 2017). "Small Clarinets: History, Instruments, and Music". The Galpin Society Journal. 70: 135-168, 230-231. ISSN 0072-0127. JSTOR 45200834. Wikidata Q123583006.
- Shackleton, Nicholas (2001). "Clarinet: II. The clarinet of Western art music". Grove Music Online (8th ed.). Oxford University Press. doi:10.1093/gmo/9781561592630.article.52768. ISBN 978-1-56159-263-0. (subscription, Wikilibrary access, or UK public library membership required)
- Tschaikov, Basil (1995). "The high clarinets". In Lawson, Colin (ed.). The Cambridge Companion to the Clarinet. Cambridge Companions. Cambridge University Press. p. 43–56. doi:10.1017/CCOL9780521470667. ISBN 978-1-139-00205-9. OL 1121104M. Wikidata Q116448371.
