= Roberto Molinelli =

Italian composer

Roberto Molinelli (born 1963, Ancona) is an Italian composer, conductor and violist.

He has graduated with honors and won prizes in national and international competitions. His CD on Carl Reinecke's chamber music was awarded with "CD of the Month" prize on "CD Classical" magazine. As a composer, arranger and conductor he has collaborated with many Artists such as Andrea Bocelli, Sarah Brightman, Gustav Kuhn, Cecilia Gasdia, Anna Caterina Antonacci, Valeria Esposito, Andrea Griminelli, Valeria Moriconi, Federico Mondelci, Enrico Dindo, Elena Zaniboni, Danilo Rossi, Giorgio Zagnoni.

His premières have been performed by many Orchestras worldwide (Orchestra Filarmonica della Scala, La Scala Theatre, Moscow Chamber Orchestra, Ural Philharmonic Orchestra, Manchester Camerata, Norwalk Symphony Orchestra, Slovenian Radio-TV Orchestra, Orchestra Haydn Bozen, Orchestra di Padova e del Veneto, I Solisti di Pavia with Enrico Dindo, Euroradio Concerts live via satellite, Symph. Orch. of Sanremo, Orchestra Filarmonica Marchigiana, Istituzione Sinfonica Abruzzese, Orchestra di Roma e del Lazio, Symph. Orch. of Bari) in many Concert Halls (Carnegie Hall, New York City, Moscow International House of Music, Manchester Cello Festival, Brunnenhof Monaco di Baviera, Marinskij Theatre St.Petersburg, Theatre de Las Bellas Artes, Mexico City, Norwalk Concert Hall, Auditorium RadioTV Slovenia, The Presidential Symphony Orchestra Concert Hall, Ankara, Turkey).

He has also written original music for soundtracks and famous advertising campaigns (Barilla Italian pasta, broadcast in many countries from 1999 to 2007), and did collaborations with famous Italian pop music artists, among others Lucio Dalla, Angelo Branduardi, Alexia, Mario Lavezzi.

He wrote arrangements and has been the conductor at Sanremo Music Festival in two editions, 2005 and 2009, winning the special prize for the best arrangement with the song "Biancaneve" (by Mogol-Lavezzi).

He has been member and president of the jury of Sanremolab – Song Academy of Sanremo, from 2004 to 2006.

His opera "Montessoriana", dedicated to Maria Montessori on her centenary celebration 1907–2007, has been performed under his conduction in Sweden, United States of America, and in Italy, in Rome, in "Sinopoli Grand Hall" of "Auditorium Parco della Musica".

He is the artistic director for Innovation of G.Rossini Symphony Orchestra, since 2009. He is Viola Professor at the Conservatory of Parma.

== Other activities ==
In the late '80s and early '90s he developed and composed the music for Amiga games, among which, published by Proxxima Software SRL and later available also in PC version.

== Works ==
- Chanson antique, for flute, viola and harp, 1986.
- Milonga Para Astor, for viola, cello and strings orchestra, 1988.
- Tosca... tu a me una vita, io a te chieggo un istante!, fantasy-concerto from the opera Tosca by Giacomo Puccini for viola and strings orchestra, 1997.
- Movie Concerto, scenes written like a soundtrack, for viola and symphony orchestra, 1999.
- Padre nostro, for tenor and symphony orchestra, 2000.
- Leonard ouverture, for big symphony orchestra, 2000.
- Montessoriana, cantata for soprano, dramatic reading, viola, children's choir and orchestra, texts by Paolo Peretti, 2000.
- Four pictures from New York, for saxophone and symphony orchestra, 2001.
- Opus 7, n° 5, variations on a theme by Haendel, for symphony orchestra, 2001.
- Elegia per Manhattan, for viola, cello and strings orchestra, 2001.
- Cadenza, for the second concert for violin and orchestra “La campanella” by Niccolò Paganini, 2001.
- Impressioni di metà secolo, for piccolo, flute, flute in G, bass flute, 2002.
- Due cadenze, for the Concert in C minor for viola and orchestra by Johann Christian Bach, 2002.
- Once upon a memory, four season tales for armonica, bandoneon, piano narrator and symphony orchestra, 2003.
- Processo a Babbo Natale, comic opera in one act for soprano, comic bass-baritone, pop vocalist, choir and symphony orchestra, 2003.
- Twin legends, for cello and strings orchestra, 2004.
- Crystalligence, for solo cello, 2005.
- Papa Wojtyla, multimedial oratorio for soloists, rapper, dramatic reading, choir and symphony orchestra, 2006.
- Once upon a memory, for viola (plus electric viola), piano, drums and strings orchestra, 2007.
- The Lodger, original soundtrack for the silent movie by Alfred Hitchcock, 2008
- Trittico, for bandoneon and orchestra, 2009.
- Nubicuculìa, theatre music, 2009.
- Sempre caro mi è, for flute, harp, violin, cello and piano, commissioned by Parco naturale regionale del Monte San Bartolo, 2009.
- Chanson y Milonga, for harp and piano, 2009
- Preghiera ad Iside, for baritone and strings orchestra, on a text found inside the Piramid of Unas, 2009
- FJH Divertimento – on Franz Joseph Haydn's name, for symphony orchestra, commissioned by Haydn Orchestra of Bolzano and Trento, 2009
- Iconogramma, concerto in four movements for cello and symphony orchestra, 2010
- Saxwalk, for saxophone and strings orchestra, 2010
- S Come..., for accordion, bandoneon and orchestra, 2011
- Bridges, for 2 clarinets and orchestra, for Eddie Daniels and Corrado Giuffredi, 2012
- Eos, for solo cello and cellos orchestra (for Mario Brunello), 2012
- Zorn Hoffnung Gesang, for violin and symphony orchestra, for Domenico Nordio, commissioned by the International Competition "2nd of August", 2012
