= Dietz Klarinettenbau =

Clarinet manufacturer

Dietz Klarinettenbau GmbH & Co. KG
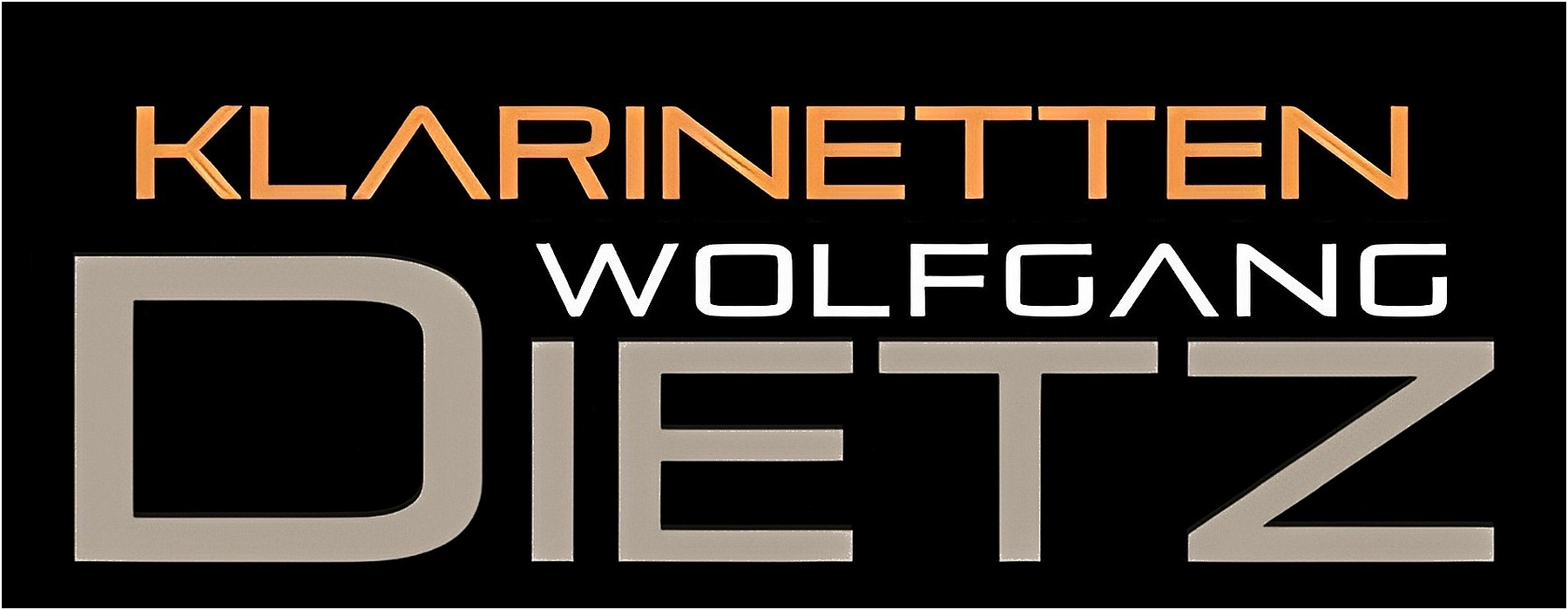
- Industry: Clarinet makers
- Founded: 1989
- Founder: Wolfgang Dietz
- Headquarters: Neustadt an der Aisch, Germany
- Key people: Wolfgang Dietz, Ludwig Dietz
- Products: clarinets
- Website: dietz-klarinetten.de

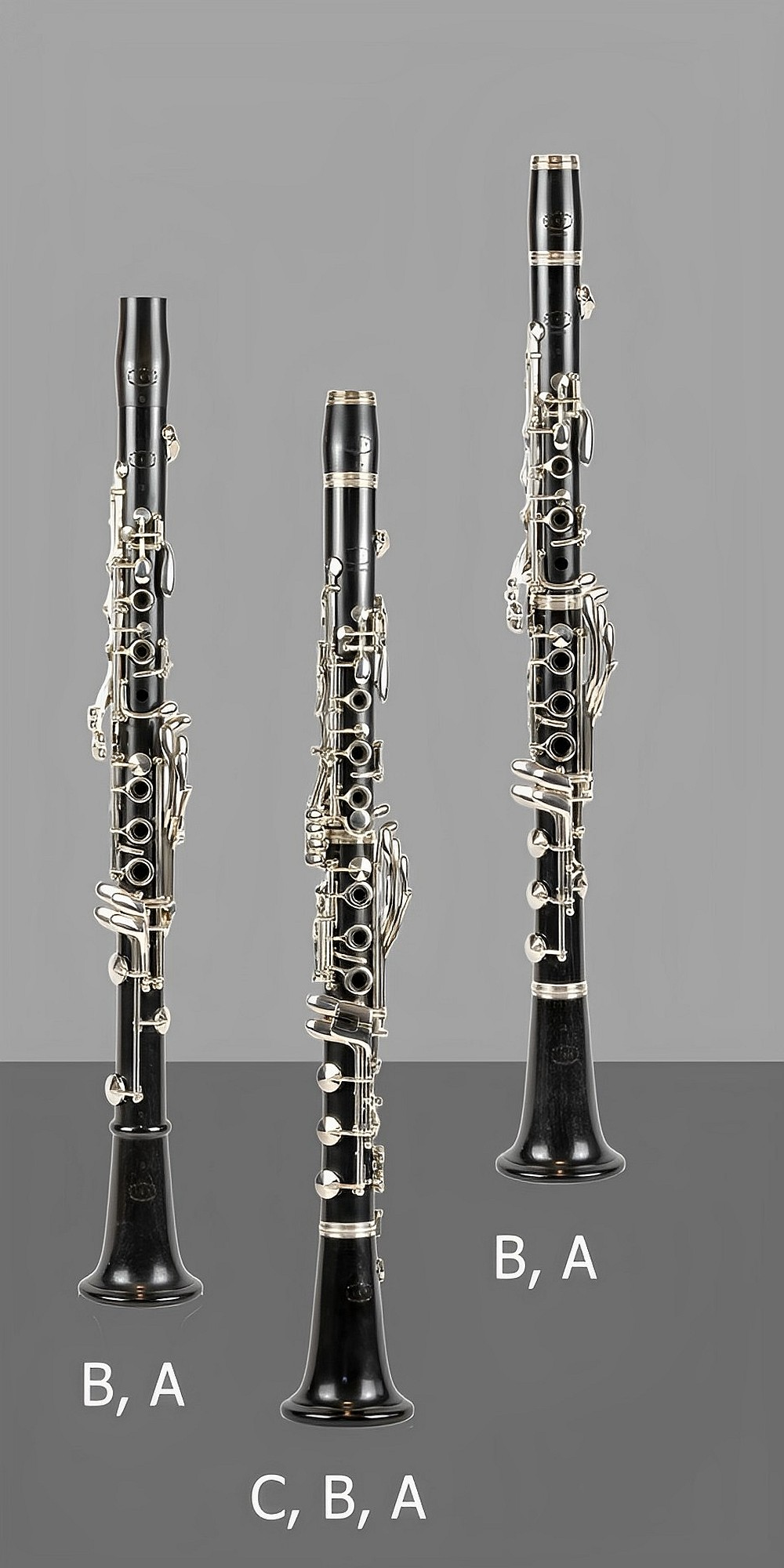
Clarinet Boehm system, Clarinet Reform Boehm system, Hybrid clarinet

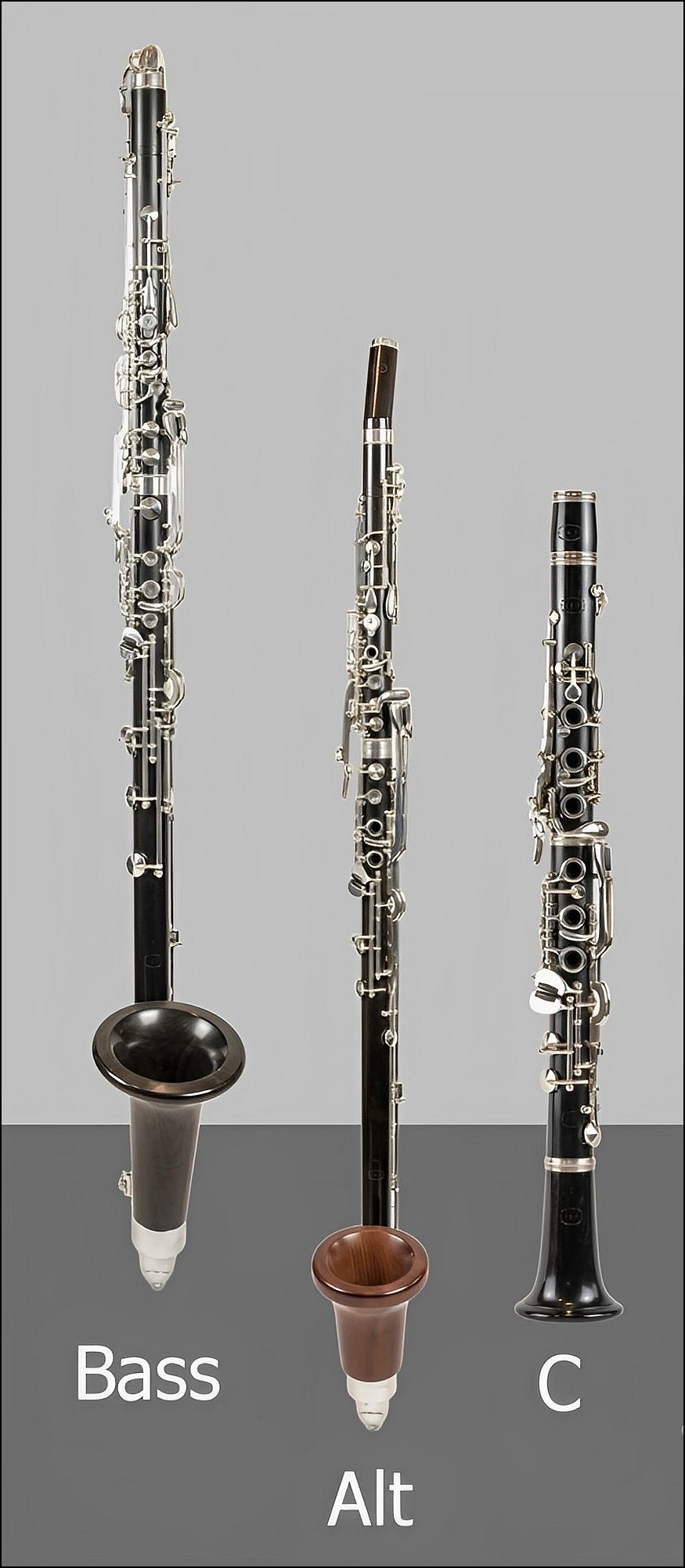
Clarinets German system: bass clarinet range to low C, E♭ alto clarinet range to low C (!), soprano clarinet in C

Dietz Klarinettenbau GmbH & Co. KG is a German clarinet manufacturer based in Neustadt an der Aisch, Bavaria.

== History ==
In 1989, the master woodwind instrument maker Wolfgang Dietz became self-employed by setting up a small workshop in his home in Neustadt an der Aisch and founded a manufactory for the production of handmade clarinets under the name Klarinetten Wolfgang Dietz. In 1999 Dietz built a new workshop next to the residential house. On 19 November 2010, the company was transformed into its current legal form with the partners Wolfgang Dietz and Ludwig Gerd Dietz, son of the founder and also a master clarinet maker. Despite the change in the company name, the clarinets produced continue to be sold under the label Klarinetten Wolfgang Dietz, and the corresponding logo has also been retained.

Neustadt an der Aisch, with its Herbert Wurlitzer, Leitner & Kraus and Dietz manufactories, can be considered the Mecca of German clarinet manufacturing.

== Products ==
Clarinets of different tunings with the German and the French fingering system (Oehler system and Böhm system) are made to order. as well as those with the Reform Boehm system and also Hybrid clarinets. Various models are available in grenadilla, mopane, cocobolo and boxwood. By default, the instruments are tuned to 442 to 443 Hz for concert pitch A, but several other tunings are available on request. Versions for left-handers can also be made. Unique in the world is an alto clarinet that reaches (notated) low C, like a basset horn.

The instruments are handcrafted with a moderate use of machinery with great care and accuracy and then approved. Each instrument is a one-off.

== Award ==
Dietz Klarinettenbau was awarded the German Musical Instrument Award 2020 in the category A clarinet (German system) for the instrument "A clarinet student model".

== Sales ==
About 70% of Dietz instruments are sold in Germany and Austria, about 20% are exported to other EU countries, and the rest all over the world. The customers are mainly students at conservatories and professional clarinettists.

== See also ==
- Boehm system
- Oehler system
