= Royal College of Music =

College in Kensington and Chelsea, England

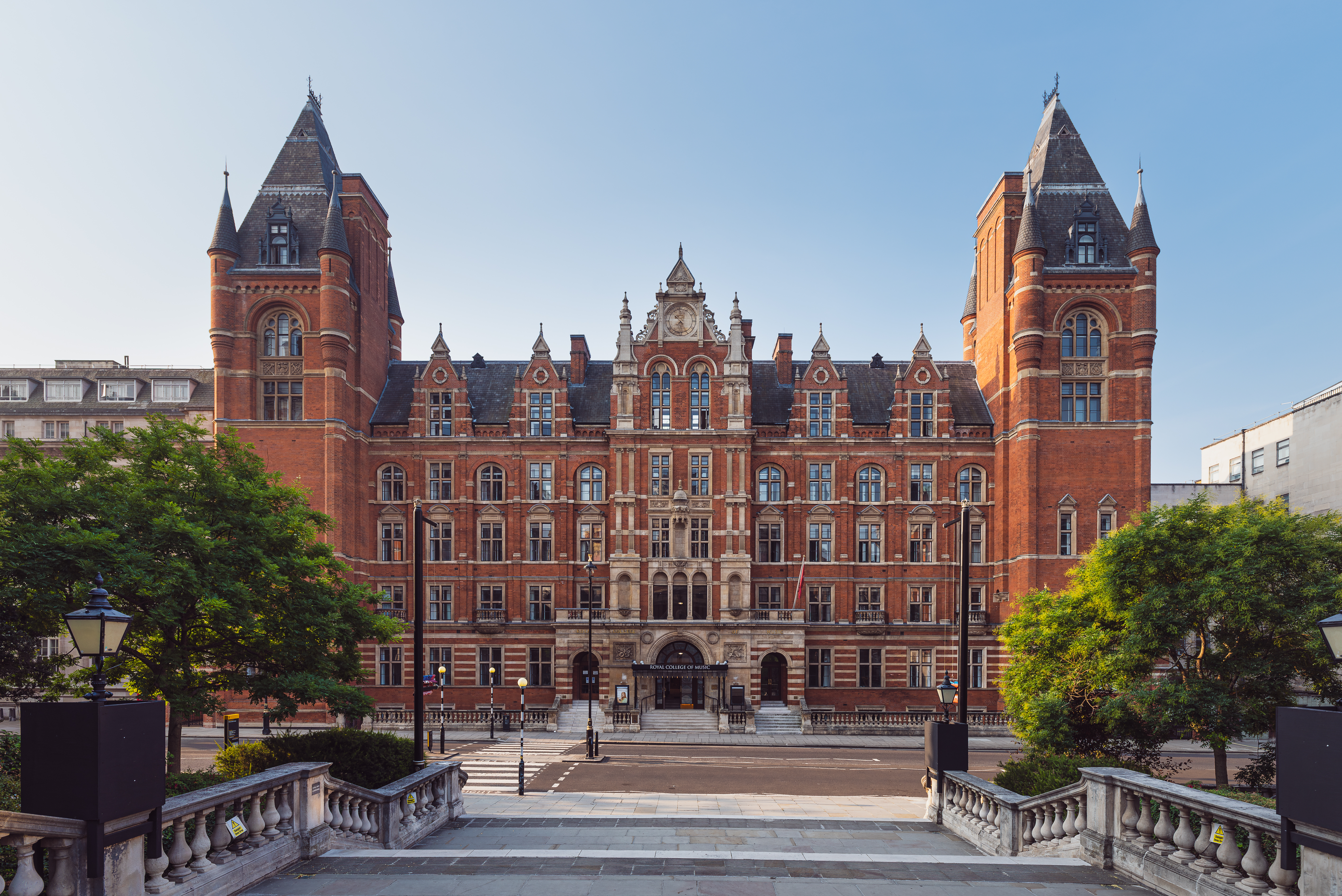
- Front façade of the Royal College of Music
- Type: Public
- Established: 1882; 144 years ago
- Affiliations: Conservatoires UK; Associated Board of the Royal Schools of Music; Universities UK
- Endowment: £52.9 million (2025)
- Budget: £43.4 million (2024/25)
- Chairman: Guy Black, Baron Black of Brentwood
- Director: James Williams
- Patron: Charles III
- Students: 995 (2024/25)
- Undergraduates: 490 (2024/25)
- Postgraduates: 505 (2024/25)
- Location: Prince Consort Road, London, England; 51°29′59″N 0°10′37″W
- Campus: Urban
- Website: rcm.ac.uk

The Royal College of Music (RCM) is a conservatoire established by royal charter in 1882, located in South Kensington, London, England. It offers training from the undergraduate to the doctoral level in all aspects of Western Music including performance, composition, conducting, music theory and history, and has trained some of the most important figures in international music life. The RCM also conducts research in performance practice and performance science.

The RCM has over 900 students from more than 50 countries, with professors who include many who are musicians with worldwide reputations.

The college is one of the four conservatories of the Associated Board of the Royal Schools of Music and a member of Conservatoires UK. Its buildings are directly opposite the Royal Albert Hall on Prince Consort Road, next to Imperial College and among the museums and cultural centres of Albertopolis.

== History ==
=== Background ===
The Royal College of Music was founded in 1883 to replace the short-lived and unsuccessful National Training School of Music (NTSM). The idea for the NTSM was initially proposed by the Prince Consort decades before the school opened. Conservatoires to train young students for a musical career had been set up in major European cities, but in London the long-established Royal Academy of Music had not supplied suitable training for professional musicians: in 1870 it was estimated that fewer than ten per cent of instrumentalists in London orchestras had studied at the academy.

The NTSM opened in 1876, in a building to the west of the Royal Albert Hall in Kensington Gore with Arthur Sullivan as its principal. Under Sullivan, a reluctant and ineffectual principal, the NTSM failed to provide a satisfactory alternative to the Royal Academy and, by 1880, a committee of examiners comprising Charles Hallé, Sir Julius Benedict, Sir Michael Costa, Henry Leslie and Otto Goldschmidt reported that the school lacked "executive cohesion". The following year Sullivan resigned and was replaced by John Stainer. The original plan was to merge the Royal Academy of Music and the National Training School of Music into a single, enhanced organisation. The NTSM agreed, but after prolonged negotiations, the Royal Academy refused to enter into the proposed scheme.

In 1881, with George Grove as a leading instigator and with the support of the Prince of Wales, a draft charter was drawn up for a successor body to the NTSM. The Royal College of Music occupied the premises previously home to the NTSM and opened there on 7 May 1883. Grove was appointed its first director. There were 50 scholars elected by competition and 42 fee-paying students.

=== Early years ===
Grove, a close friend of Sullivan, loyally maintained that the new college was a natural evolution from the NTSM. In reality, his aims were radically different from Sullivan's. In his determination that the new institution should succeed as a training ground for orchestral players, Grove had two principal allies: the violinist Henry Holmes and the composer and conductor Charles Villiers Stanford. They believed that a capable college orchestra would not only benefit instrumental students, but would give students of composition the essential chance to experience the sound of their music. The college's first intake of scholarship students included 28 who studied an orchestral instrument. The potential strength of the college orchestra, including fee-paying instrumental students, was 33 violins, five violas, six cellos, one double bass, one flute, one oboe and two horns. Grove appointed 12 professors of orchestral instruments, in addition to distinguished teachers in other musical disciplines including Jenny Lind (singing), Hubert Parry (composition), Ernst Pauer (piano), Arabella Goddard (piano) and Walter Parratt (organ).

The old premises proved restrictive and a new building was commissioned in the early 1890s on a new site in Prince Consort Road, South Kensington. The building was designed by Sir Arthur Blomfield in Flemish Mannerist style in red brick dressed with buff-coloured Welden stone. Construction began in 1892 and the building opened in May 1894. The building was largely paid for by two large donations from Samson Fox, a Yorkshire industrialist, whose statue, along with that of the Prince of Wales, stands in the entrance hall.

Grove retired at the end of 1894 and was succeeded as director by Hubert Parry.

=== Later history ===
Parry died in 1918 and was succeeded as director by Sir Hugh Allen (1919–37), Sir George Dyson (1938–52), Sir Ernest Bullock (1953–59), Sir Keith Falkner (1960–74), Sir David Willcocks (1974–84), Michael Gough Matthews(1985–93), Dame Janet Ritterman (1993–2005) and Professor Colin Lawson (2005-2024). The College's current Director is James Williams, whose tenure began in September 2024.

The College's teaching professoriate numbers over 200 musicians, including internationally known figures like Dmitri Alexeev, Martyn Brabbins, Natalie Clein, Danny Driver, Martin Gatt, Chen Jiafeng, Jakob Lindberg, Mike Lovatt, Patricia Rozario, Brindley Sherratt, Ashley Solomon, Mark-Anthony Turnage, Maxim Vengerov, Roger Vignoles, Raphael Wallfisch and Errollyn Wallen as well as principals of the major London orchestras including the London Symphony, BBC Symphony, London Philharmonic and the Philharmonia.

Since its founding in 1882, the college has been linked with the British royal family and its Patron is His Majesty King Charles III. For 40 years Queen Elizabeth the Queen Mother was president; in 1993 Charles III (then Prince of Wales) became president.

Opened in 2016, the Royal College of Music's hall of residence, Prince Consort Village, provides accommodation for more than 400 students and with acoustically treated bedrooms and dedicated practise rooms.

The college is a registered charity under English law.

== Curriculum ==
The college teaches all aspects of Western classical music from undergraduate to doctoral level. There is a junior department, where 300 children aged 8 to 18 are educated on Saturdays.

== Partnership ==
Since August 2011, RCM has been collaborating with Nanyang Academy of Fine Arts, Singapore, and now offers both undergraduate and taught postgraduate degree programmes, jointly conferred by both institutions.

== Performance venues ==
The RCM has a wide variety of concert venues including the Amaryllis Fleming Concert Hall, a 468-seat barrel-vaulted concert hall designed by Blomfield, built in 1901 and extensively restored in 2008–09. The Britten Theatre seats 400, and was opened by Queen Elizabeth II in 1986 and is used for opera, ballet, music and theatre. There is also a 150-seat recital hall dating from 1965, as well as several smaller recital rooms, including three organ-equipped Parry Rooms.

A £40 million development was completed in 2021 and the estate’s footprint was almost doubled. This included the creation of two new performance spaces: the Performance Hall which seats 140 people, and the Performance Studio which was enhanced in 2023 following a £1.89 million investment from the Arts and Humanities Research Council to incorporate state-of-the-art acoustic and visual performance simulation technologies.

== Royal College of Music Collections ==
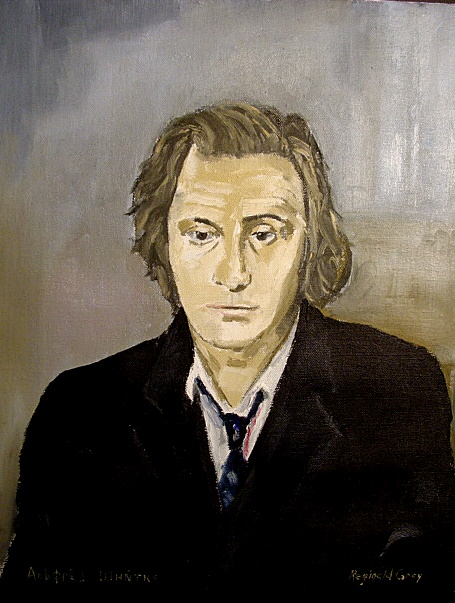
Alfred Schnittke by Reginald Gray

The Royal College of Music Museum houses over 14,000 items, representing a range of music-making activities over a period of more than five centuries. Amongst instruments housed in the museum is a clavicytherium, thought to be the world's oldest surviving keyboard instrument, and the earliest known guitar. Following a £3.6 million investment from Heritage Lottery Fund, the Museum underwent a major redevelopment in 2020–21.

Owing partly to the vision of its founders, particularly Grove, the RCM now holds significant Collection Materials, dating from the fifteenth century onwards. These include autograph manuscripts such as Anne Boleyn's Music Book, Chopin's Minute Waltz, Elgar's Cello Concerto, Haydn's String Quartet No. 48 Op. 64/1 and Mozart's Piano Concerto No. 24 in C Minor K491. More extensive collections feature the music of Herbert Howells and Frank Bridge and film scores by Stanley Myers. Among more than 300 original portraits are John Cawse's 1826 painting of Weber (the last of the composer), Haydn by Thomas Hardy (1791) and Bartolommeo Nazari's painting of Farinelli at the height of his fame. A recent addition to the collection is a portrait of the Russian composer Alfred Schnittke by Reginald Gray. 10,000 prints and photographs constitute the most substantial archive of images of musicians in the UK. The RCM's 600,000 concert programmes document concert life from 1730 to the present day. There are also more than 800 musical instruments and accessories from circa 1480 to the present.

Early RCM pupils included (clockwise from top left) Coleridge-Taylor, Holst, Vaughan Williams and Ireland

== Alumni ==
Since opening in 1882, the college has had a distinguished list of teachers and alumni, including most of the composers who brought about the "English Musical Renaissance" of the 19th and 20th centuries.

Students in the time of Stanford and Parry included Samuel Coleridge-Taylor, Gustav Holst, Ralph Vaughan Williams and John Ireland. Later alumni include Louise Alder, Sir Thomas Allen, Stanley Bate, Benjamin Britten, Dame Sarah Connolly, Colin Davis, Sir James Galway, Peggy Glanville-Hicks, Gwyneth Jones, Rowland Lee, Neville Marriner, Anna Meredith, Hugh McLean, Tarik O'Regan, Gervase de Peyer, Trevor Pinnock, Anna Russell, Dame Joan Sutherland, Mark-Anthony Turnage, Andrew Lloyd Webber, Julian Lloyd Webber, James Horner, Sir Reginald Thatcher, Michael Tippett and the guitarist John Williams.

=== Directors of the RCM ===
- Sir George Grove (1882)
- Sir Hubert Parry (1895)
- Sir Hugh Allen (1918)
- Sir George Dyson (1938)
- Sir Ernest Bullock (1953)
- Sir Keith Falkner (1960)
- Sir David Willcocks (1974)
- Michael Gough Matthews (1985)
- Dame Janet Ritterman (1993)
- Colin Lawson (2005)
- James Williams (since 2024)

== Awards ==
Awards include ARCM (Associate), LRCM (Licentiate) and FRCM (Fellow).

Each year the Royal College of Music bestows a number of honorary degrees, memberships and fellowships on individuals who have made an exceptional contribution to life at the RCM and the wider musical community.

== See also ==
- Royal College of Music war memorial
- Royal Academy of Music
- London College of Music
- Guildhall School of Music
- Royal Northern College of Music
