= Corrado Giuffredi =

Corrado Giuffredi is an Italian clarinetist. He studied at the Conservatory of Parma. Since 2003, he has been the principal clarinetist of the Orchestra della Svizzera Italiana. He is also a soloist, both in international performances and through his online presence, with videos on YouTube and other platforms.

Giuffredi performed the Italian premiere of Krzysztof Penderecki's Concerto for Clarinet and Orchestra. He teaches clarinet at the Istituto Musicale Superiore di Modena.

Corrado is a Backun Musical Services artist. He has recorded for record labels including EMI, Giuffredi Records, Arts, Foné, and Stradivarius.
