= Hanson Clarinet Company =

British musical instrument makers

Hanson Clarinet Company is a manufacturer of woodwind instruments noted for the clarinets made in its workshops in Marsden, West Yorkshire. It is the largest manufacturer of clarinets in the United Kingdom.

In May 2010, Hanson Clarinet was awarded the world’s first Forest Stewardship Council (FSC) Chain of Custody certificate for using African Blackwood in its products. Hanson Clarinets launched the world’s first FSC-certified clarinets by late 2010. The FSC-certified wood is harvested in Tanzania.
