= Michael Gough Matthews =

Matthews as director of the Royal College of Music, 1985–1993

Michael Gough Matthews (12 July 1931 – 11 April 2013) was a British pianist, teacher and musical administrator. After starting as a concert pianist he turned to teaching, spending much of his career at the Royal College of Music in London, from 1972 to 1993, the last eight years as director of the college. His time in office was marked by a successful resistance to government plans to merge the college with the Royal Academy of Music, and by the building of a new theatre for student performances.

== Life and career ==
=== Early years ===
Matthews was born in Essex, the son of Cecil Gough Matthews, a lawyer, and his wife Amelia Eleanor Mary Matthews. He showed an early talent for music and his parents encouraged his aptitude for the piano. He was educated at Chigwell School, and he won a Junior Exhibition to the Royal College of Music (RCM) when he was eight.

In 1947, when he was 15, Matthews won an open scholarship to study with Frank Merrick at the RCM. His studies were interrupted by National Service, after which he won the Hopkinson Gold Medal in 1953, his final year as a student at the college. He then studied privately with Harold Craxton. At the International Chopin Piano Competition in 1955 he won a diploma of honour, and the following year was awarded a scholarship by the Italian government, enabling him to study in Rome with Carlo Zecchi. In 1959 he received a Chopin fellowship for advanced studies, and gave a series of recitals throughout Eastern Europe. He made his Wigmore Hall debut in 1960, after which the music critic of The Times predicted a distinguished career for him. Among the composers closest to his heart were Fauré and Brahms, and he made commercial recordings of solo music by both composers.

=== Glasgow and RCM ===
Matthews found that he could not sustain a concert career because of problems with his hands. He turned to teaching, for which he proved to have a gift. In 1964 he set up and ran a junior school within the Royal Scottish Academy of Music in Glasgow, holding this post until 1971. In 1972 he returned to the RCM, where he worked for the rest of his career. Under the directorship of Sir Keith Falkner he was appointed director of the junior department, and professor of piano. After Sir David Willcocks succeeded Falkner, Matthews became registrar in 1975, and director of studies and Willcock's vice-director in 1978.

When Willcocks retired at the end of 1984, Matthews was appointed as his successor. The Times said of him that, modest and self-effacing, he was an excellent deputy to Willcocks, who had a busy performing and composing schedule, "but when he himself became director his steely determination came to the fore." In 1990 a government enquiry chaired by Lord Gowrie recommended that the RCM and the Royal Academy of Music (RAM) should merge. The RAM was initially not wholly antipathetic to the proposal, but for the RCM Matthews fought it implacably and successfully, and both institutions retained their independence.

As well as maintaining the RCM's independence, Matthews was proud of recruiting a faculty made up of the highest-quality teachers, and of the construction of the college's Britten Theatre for opera, designed by Sir Hugh Casson, which opened in 1986. As director, Matthews worked to promote the RCM abroad; he travelled widely throughout the Far East, giving master classes in, and attracting many students from, Japan, Korea and Hong Kong.

Matthews retired as director in 1993, and was appointed vice-president of the college, and later awarded an honorary DMus. The Times observed, "He continued to teach, adjudicate and to sit on the boards of many musical organisations, including the Associated Board of the Royal Schools of Music, the London International String Quartet Competition and the Comité d'Honneur Presence de l'Art Paris." He was Vice-President of the Royal College of Organists, and the National Youth Choir.

Matthews retired to Mayfield, East Sussex together with his long-term partner Patrick Burns, with whom he entered into a civil partnership in 2006, and who outlived him. Matthews died on 11 April 2013, aged 81.
