= Leitner & Kraus =

German clarinet manufacturer

Leitner & Kraus GmbH
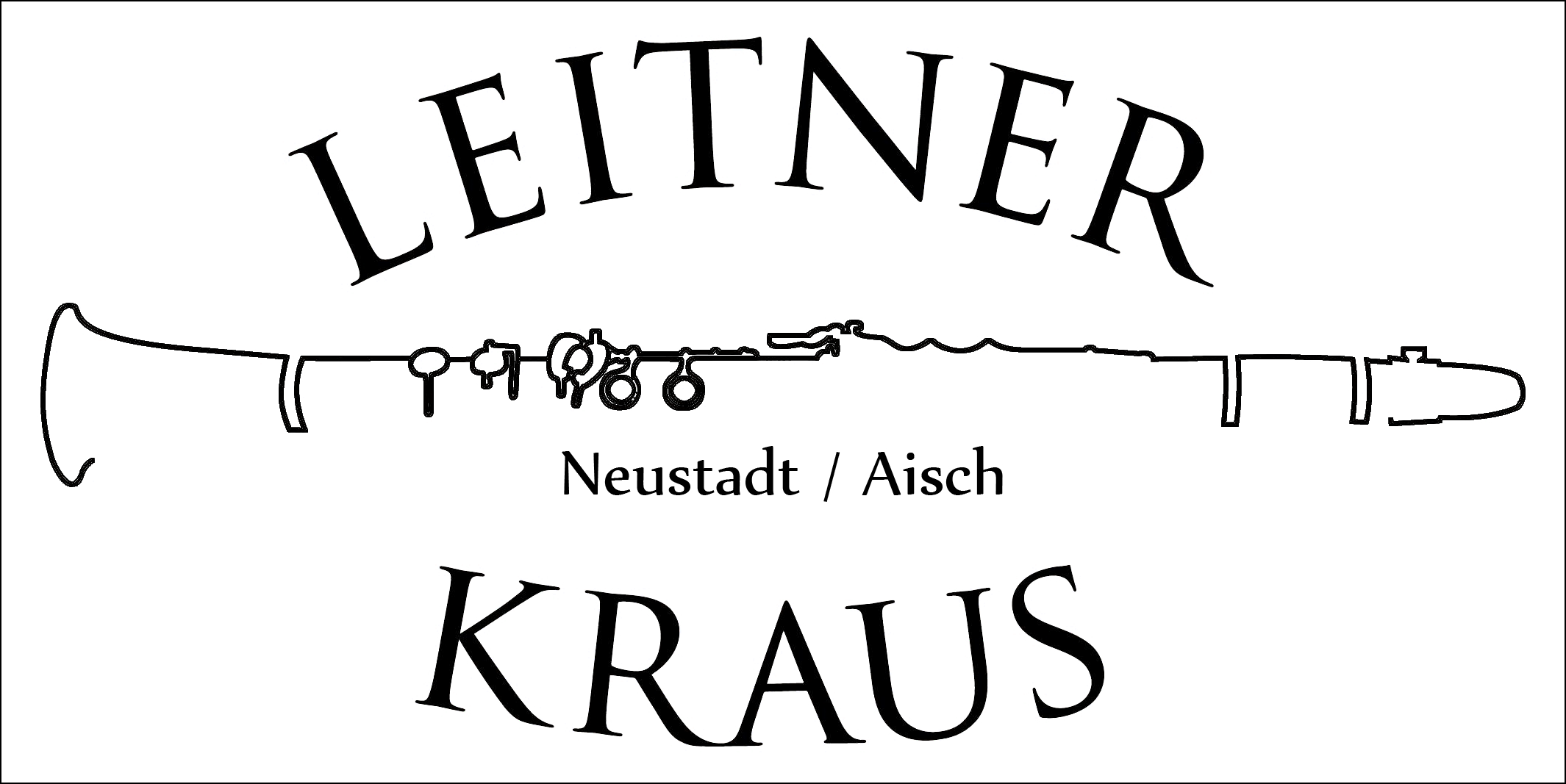
- Type: Gesellschaft mit beschränkter Haftung (Deutschland) GmbH (like Ltd.)
- Industry: Clarinet makers
- Founded: 1993
- Headquarters: Neustadt an der Aisch, Germany
- Key people: Josef Leitner and Wolfgang Kraus
- Website: https://www.leitner-kraus.de/

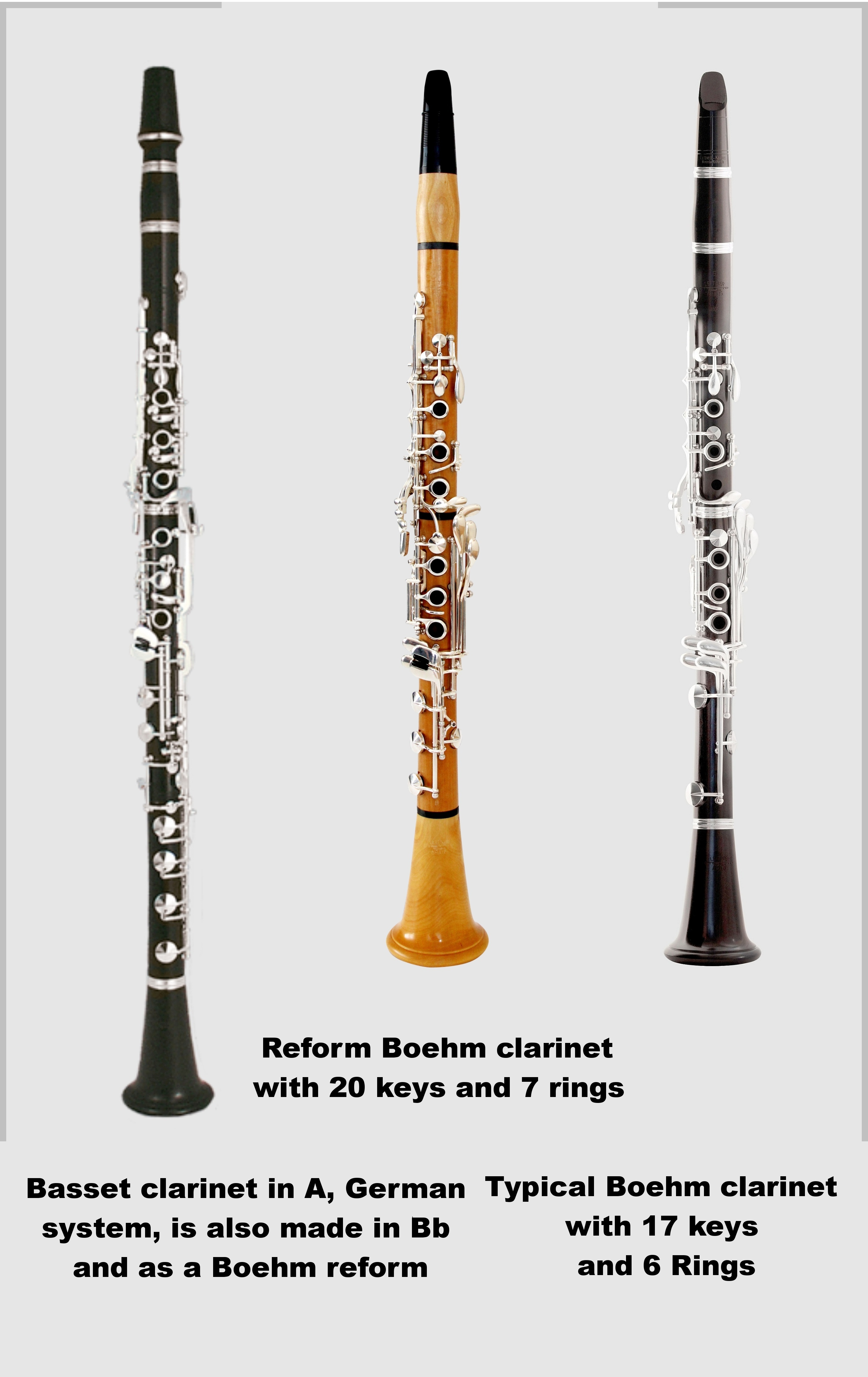

Leitner & Kraus is a German clarinet manufacturer based in Neustadt an der Aisch, Bavaria.

== Overview ==
The company was founded in 1993 by Josef Leitner and Wolfgang Kraus. In 2001 the company expanded its production and moved to new facilities. As of 2019, Leitner & Kraus employs 15 people.

== Products ==
Clarinets of different moods are produced with the German and the French fingering system as well as those with the Reform Boehm system. With German system (Oehler) 10 models in Bb and A, of which one is a Viennese model with further bore, three models in C, and four in D and high-Es are offered. The lower section is covered by three basset horns in F and three long bass clarinets ranging to low-C. With the French system (Boehm) the company manufactures four models in Bb and A, with the reform Boehm system six models in Bb and A, a Bassett clarinet in Bb and A and three models in C, D and Es, as well as a basset horn in F. The instruments are made to order, using grenadilla wood, on special request also from cocobolo.

For the German models the company developed a new patented A-Bb-Enhancement. For the Bb-Clarinet with German System, Model 250, the company received the 2016 German Musical Instrument Award.

While some clarinet makers dispense with the production of mouthpieces, Leitner & Kraus devotes special attention to this important part and offers a configurator for the right choice of mouthpiece on its website. There are mouthpieces for German and French clarinets, with different track lengths and web openings, made of “Zelltec”, a composite material, and of "cast wood" (linea verde), a material developed by the company.

The instruments of Leitner & Kraus are mainly sold in Germany. 20 to 25% of the production is spread over several European countries, the US and China.
