= Soprano clarinet =

Member of the clarinet family

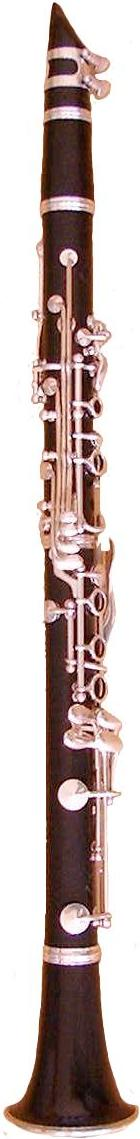

Woodwind instrument
- Classification: Wind; Woodwind; Single-reed

Playing range
- Written: E₃ to C₇ Sounding: D₃ to B♭₆

Related instruments
- Piccolo clarinet; Basset clarinet; Clarinet d'amore; Basset horn; Alto clarinet; Bass clarinet

Musicians
- See list of clarinetists

A soprano clarinet is a clarinet that is higher in register than the basset horn or alto clarinet. The unmodified word clarinet usually refers to the B♭ clarinet, which is by far the most common type. The term soprano also applies to the clarinets in A and C, and even the low G clarinet—rare in Western music but popular in the folk music of Turkey—which sounds a whole tone lower than the A. Some writers reserve a separate category of sopranino clarinets for the E♭ and D clarinets, while some regarded them as soprano clarinets. All have a written range from the E below middle C to about the C three octaves above middle C, with the sounding pitches determined by the particular instrument's transposition.

Orchestral composers largely write for soprano clarinets in B♭ and A. Clarinets in C were used likewise from the Classical era until about 1910. Wolfgang Amadeus Mozart also called for clarinets in B♮ when writing in keys with many sharps (e.g. the E major arias in Idomeneo and Così fan tutte), but this became obsolete far sooner. There have also been soprano clarinets in C, A, and B♭ with curved barrels and bells marketed under the names Saxonette, Claribel, and Clariphon.

Shackleton lists also obsolete "sopranino" clarinets in (high) G, F, and E, and soprano clarinets in B♮ and A♭.

== Contemporary works for clarinet in C ==
- Richard Barrett: knospend-gespaltener for solo clarinet in C
- James Erber: Strange Moments of Intimacy for solo clarinet in C
