= Colin Lawson =

British clarinettist, scholar, and broadcaster

Colin Lawson CBE FRCM
- Born: Colin James Lawson; 24 July 1949 (age 77); Saltburn-by-the-Sea, North Yorkshire, England
- Genres: Classical
- Occupations: Musician, scholar, broadcaster
- Instrument: Clarinet

Colin James Lawson CBE FRCM (born 24 July 1949) is a British clarinettist, scholar, and broadcaster.

== Life and career ==
He was born in Saltburn-by-the-Sea and educated at Bradford Grammar School. A pupil of Thea King, Lawson was a member of the National Youth Orchestra of Great Britain during his teenage years. He subsequently read music at Keble College, Oxford. Postgraduate studies in music at the University of Birmingham saw Lawson awarded an MA in 1972 for his study of the clarinet in eighteenth-century repertoire. His pioneering doctoral research into the chalumeau was completed at the University of Aberdeen in 1976. In 2000, in recognition of his work across theory and practice, Lawson received a DMus from the University of London. In 2015, celebrating Lawson's pre-eminence in performance studies, the University of Sheffield awarded him an HonDMus. In December 2025 Lawson was awarded an HonDMus by the Royal College of Music.

Following academic positions in Aberdeen and Sheffield, Lawson was appointed to the Chair of Performance Studies at Goldsmiths, University of London in 1998. Between 2001 and 2005 he was Pro-Vice Chancellor and Dean of the London College of Music & Media at Thames Valley University (now the University of West London). Between July 2005 and August 2024 he was Director of the Royal College of Music, London. He continues his association with the institution as the holder of a Personal Chair in Historical Performance, and was appointed an RCM Vice-President in 2024.

Lawson is internationally recognised as a performer of chalumeaux and historical clarinets, having held principal positions with leading British period orchestras, notably The Hanover Band, The English Concert and the London Classical Players, with whom he recorded extensively and toured world-wide. Described as 'a brilliant, absolutely world-class player' (Westdeutsche Allgemeine Zeitung) and ‘the doyen of period clarinettists’ (BBC Music Magazine), he has appeared as soloist in many international venues, including London's major concert halls and New York's Lincoln Center for the Performing Arts and Carnegie Hall. His extensive discography comprises concertos by Fasch, Hook, Mahon, Mozart, Spohr, Telemann, Vivaldi and Weber, as well as a considerable variety of chamber and orchestral music. Among more recent recordings are two discs of sonatas by Xavier Lefèvre and a highly acclaimed CD of the Mozart Clarinet Quintet and other fragments.

Lawson has an especially close association with Mozart’s Clarinet Concerto K622, which he performs regularly on both modern and historical instruments. In addition to directing performances of the work, he has played it in collaboration with conductors such as Roy Goodman, Christopher Hogwood, Roger Norrington and Joshua Rifkin. Lawson’s Cambridge Handbook to Mozart’s Clarinet Concerto (1996) examines the work’s genesis, composition and construction, as well as the career of the dedicatee Anton Stadler and his innovative basset clarinet. His first monograph, The Chalumeau in Eighteenth-Century Music, was published in 1981 by UMI Research Press, and remains the most extensive study of the instrument and its repertoire. Amongst later publications for Cambridge University Press are The Cambridge Companion to the Clarinet (1995), a Cambridge Handbook to Brahms’s Clarinet Quintet (1998) and The Cambridge Companion to the Orchestra (2003). With Robin Stowell he initiated the series of Cambridge Handbooks to the Historical Performance of Music, including their joint introductory volume (1999) as well as his own volume on the early clarinet (2000). The Cambridge History of Musical Performance edited by Lawson and Stowell was published in February 2012. Their most recent volume, The Cambridge Encyclopedia of Historical Performance in Music, was published in September 2018. In 2019 the volume was recognised as an "outstanding work of music reference", winning IAML's C.B. Oldman Award. His most recent publication is the jointly edited volume for Routledge entitled Inside the Contemporary Conservatoire: Perspectives from the Royal College of Music, London. In presenting fresh perspectives on the work of music conservatoires today, the volume takes the RCM's three founding principles of access, advocacy, and excellence as its point of departure.

In the Queen's 2016 Birthday Honours Lawson was appointed Commander of the Order of the British Empire (CBE) for services to music and music education.
