= Backun Musical Services =

Manufacturer of clarinets

Backun Musical Services Ltd.
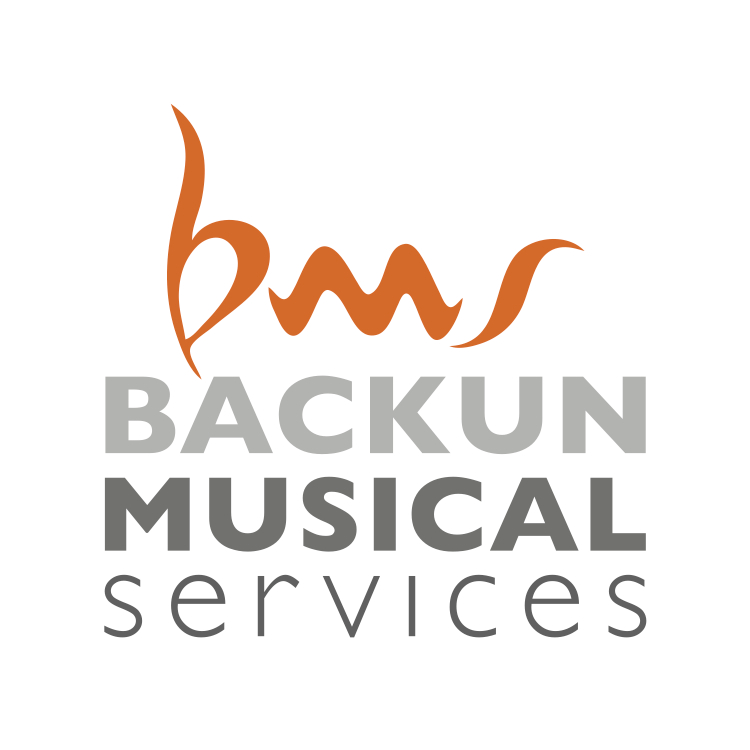
- Genre: instrument makers
- Founded: 2000 by Morrie Backun
- Headquarters: Burnaby, British Columbia Canada
- Key people: Morrie Backun, Joel Jaffe
- Products: Clarinets and Accessories
- Number of employees: estimated 70–80
- Website: https://backunmusical.com/

Backun Musical Services Ltd. (BMS) is a Canadian manufacturer of clarinets in bass, B♭ and A and accessories, based in Burnaby, British Columbia.

== History ==
In 2000 clarinetist and entrepreneur Morrie Backun opened a small repair shop for woodwind instruments with two employees. After having been commissioned by J. Wesley (Wes) Foster, Principal Clarinet of the Vancouver Symphony Orchestra to overhaul one of his clarinets, Backun was unable to complete the project, as the original barrel of the instrument was missing. After consulting with Foster, Backun set out to make a barrel from cocobolo wood (Dalbergia retusa), which became the first Backun Barrel. After a short period of making only barrels, Backun then set out to design a clarinet bell in 2001 and mouthpieces in 2004. Gaining international renown for clarinet barrels, bells and mouthpieces, in addition to designing and modifying clarinets by other makers, Backun was approached by Conn-Selmer, which had in 2004 acquired the clarinet maker Leblanc, to redesign and develop their line of clarinets. His first complete clarinet in B♭, which was distributed by Leblanc and Conn-Selmer under the label "Leblanc by Backun".

During the partnership with Conn-Selmer and Leblanc from 2006 to 2010, Backun developed new clarinets and continued to develop accessories for international distribution, which expanded the Backun brand around the world. After the end of the engagement with Conn-Selmer, Backun launched his first custom clarinets at the 2011 NAMM Show; these instruments were of exceptional high quality for professional clarinetists. As the company grew, Backun built a modern factory in Burnaby, near Vancouver, equipped with the latest CNC machinery and design equipment, including 3D printers and scanners.

In 2012 15 employees produced 30–40 clarinets monthly and thousands of accessories, largely industrially. According to Morrie Backun, the numbers in 2013 would be more than twice as high. To ensure the necessary higher sales, Backun subsequently worked on expanding its international dealer network.

In January 2017, the Eastman Music Company made a significant investment in Backun, acquiring partial ownership of Backun Musical Services. This investment allowed both companies to grow significantly in the clarinet market. As of November 2019, an estimated 50 production employees produce a considerably higher number of instruments and accessories per month, with the brand's global impact being felt throughout the band and orchestra community.

Clarinetists, including Jarrod Butler and David Shifrin have played clarinets from Backun. Some have also been involved in the development of individual instruments and / or accessories.

== Products ==
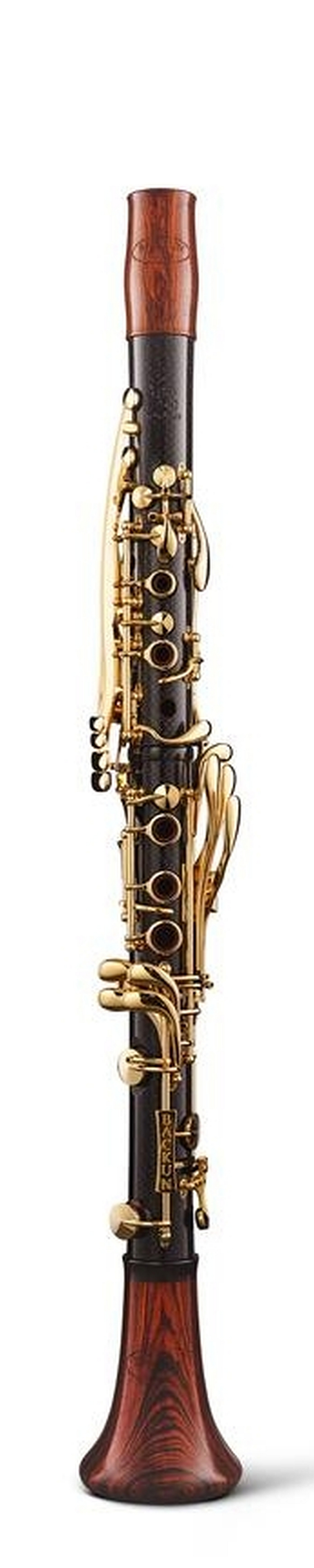
Carbon Clarinet with barrel and bell from cocobolo

Backun produces only clarinets with French fingering system (Boehm) and so far only the most common clarinets in B♭ and A. The A clarinet, Lumière model (top model), is also available as a basset clarinet. An existing Lumiere can be turned into a basset clarinet with a separately available basset lower joint.

The following clarinets are in the program:

1. Student model Alpha in B♭ made of synthetic ABS material with 17 keys and 6 rings plus optional Eb lever, with nickel- or silver-plated mechanism

2. Student model Beta in B♭ made of grenadilla (Dalbergia melanoxylon) wood, with 17 keys and 6 rings plus optional Eb lever, with nickel- or silver-plated mechanism

3. Intermediate model Protégé in B♭, optionally made of Grenadilla or Cocobolo, with 17 keys, 6 rings plus optional Eb lever, silver- or gold-plated

4. Professional model Q Series in B♭ and A made of Grenadilla with 17 keys, 6 rings plus optional Eb-lever, silver-plated
As a special limited edition Q Series in B♭ and A made of Cocobolo, like Nr. 5 with 18 keys and 6 rings including Eb lever, gold-plated for certain markets

5. Two custom models Lumière and MoBa in B♭ and A, optionally made of Grenadilla or Cocobolo, with 18 keys, 6 rings plus Eb-lever, with silver- or gold-plated mechanism. A small extra key at the bottom of the lower joint (like the Tosca by Buffet Crampon) enhances the intonation of low-F. Backun was and remains the first company to offer a Low F Vent mechanism as standard on all custom clarinets. The two models differ in appearance, as well as bore and tonehole design, given that Backun designed the Lumiere to meet the needs of players looking for more vibrant and sweeter tone than the MoBa, which is considered to be dark and powerful. Both the Lumière and MoBa models in Cocobolo are offered at a considerable extra cost as Super Series sets, in such a way that the clarinets are made entirely from the same single five foot piece of wood, and therefore has the same grain structure throughout from the B♭ down through the A.

6. Custom model CG Carbon Clarinet in B♭ and A with 18 keys, 6 rings and Eb-lever (CG are the initials of the Italian clarinettist Corrado Giuffredi). These clarinets have a patented carbon fibre outer shell on the upper and lower joints bonded to a wood core of either Grenadilla or Cocobolo. The hard-pressed with the wood core coating to prevent cracks and increase the life, but also leads to a different sound. The surface is black-mottled; barrel and bell are made of grenadilla or cocobolo for tonal reasons.

Backun utilizes a uniform design across its product line, incorporating specific barrel and bell features in both student and professional models.

The company sells its instruments directly and through a worldwide dealer network. The current prices for the mentioned models are shown on the website. The prices at the dealers are consistently cheaper.

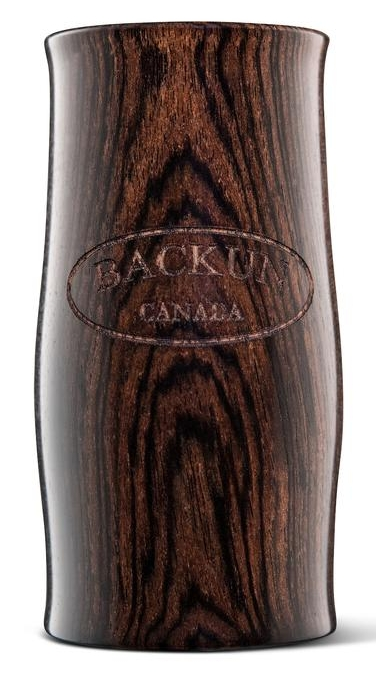
Barrel Lumiere

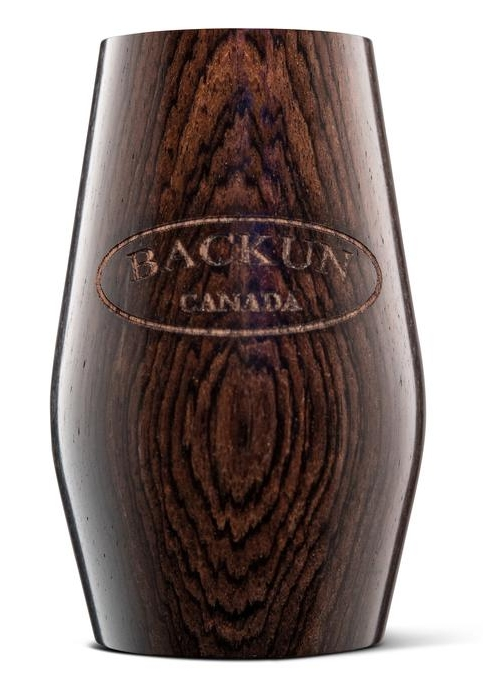
Barrel Fatboy

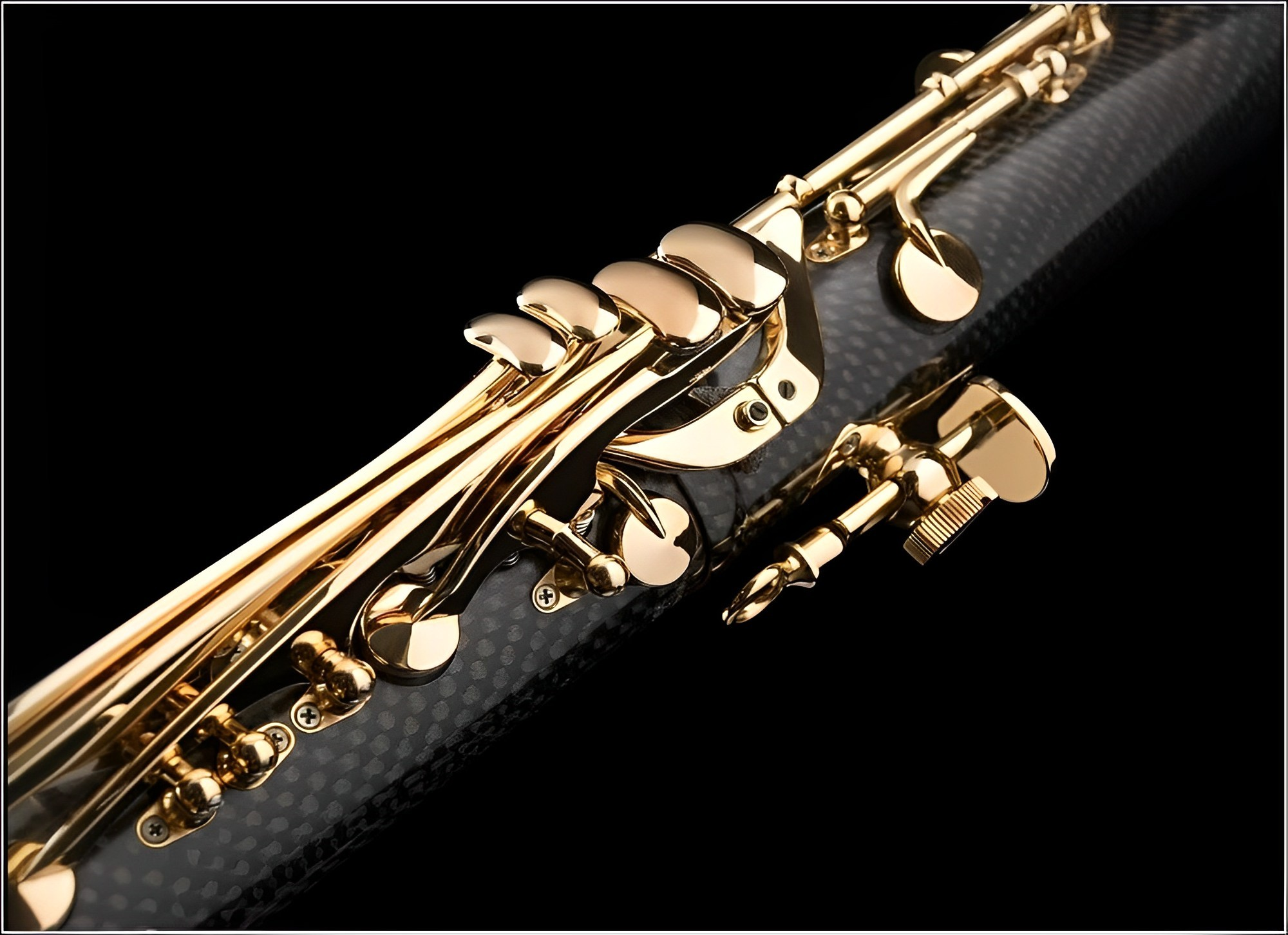
Carbon clarinet gold-plated, detail

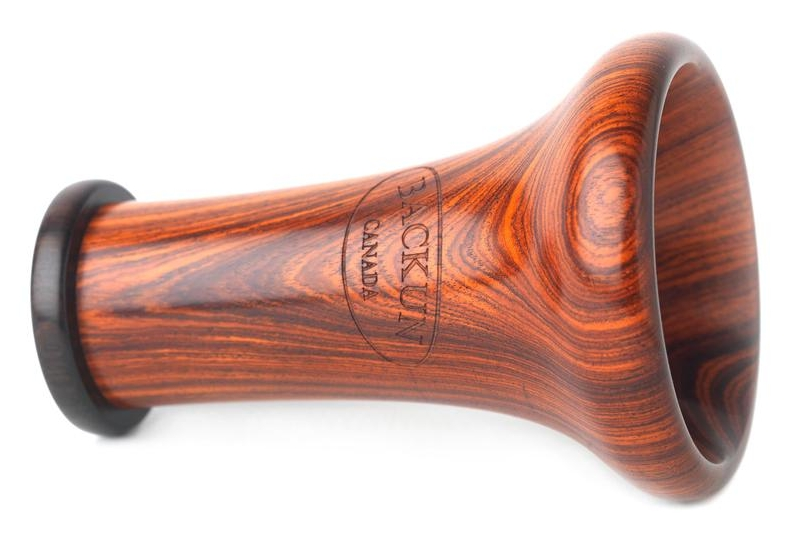
Wooden Bell for Clarinet
