= Harmonie =

Small 18th century wind ensemble

A Harmonie is an ensemble of wind instruments (usually about five to eight players) employed by an aristocratic patron, particularly during the Classical era of the 18th century. The Harmonie would be employed for outdoor or recreational music, or as a wind section of an orchestra. Music composed for Harmonie is often called Harmoniemusik.

== Terminology ==
Horace Fitzpatrick writes:

From about 1756 onward the Emperor [in Vienna] and the Austrian nobles kept house bands called Harmonien, usually made of pairs of oboes, horns, bassoons, and after about 1770, clarinets. These wind groups formed part of the household musical staff, and provided serenade for banquets and garden parties. Joseph II kept a crack Harmonie for his private delectation, drawn from the principal wind players of the Imperial opera. His successor Franz II carried on this practice.

According to Haydn biographer Rosemary Hughes:

"Feldharmonie" or simply "Harmonie," was the wind band, maintained by most noblemen even when they could not afford a larger orchestra, for performing at hunting parties and other outdoor entertainments.

Roger Hellyer, writing in the Grove Dictionary notes that while the Harmonie generally had an aristocratic patron, the same music was sometimes also played by street musicians. A letter by Wolfgang Amadeus Mozart to his father Leopold (3 November 1781) noted that street musicians had serenaded him with his own composition, the wind serenade K. 375.

In English, the word "Harmonie" exists only as a technical term of historical musicology. In other European languages, such as Dutch, French and German, the term may also refer to a modern wind band.

=== "Harmonie" as wind section ===
The aristocrats who employed a Harmonie would often also maintain a small orchestra, numerically dominated by, or consisting entirely of, the string section. When members of the Harmonie participated in performances with such orchestras, it became possible for the composer to enrich the musical texture with wind parts, without increasing the payroll cost of his patron. Thus, "Harmonie" came also to designate the wind section of a small orchestra. Of this practice, Fitzpatrick writes, "It was [Franz II's Harmonie] who made up the wind section in Beethoven's orchestra of 1800 [at the premiere of the composer's First Symphony]."

Joseph Haydn's Mass in B flat major, (H. 22/14, 1802) is nicknamed the "Harmoniemesse", because (unlike the other masses Haydn wrote during this time) it includes parts for a whole wind section, thanks to the recent reinstatement of these instruments in the musical establishment of Prince Nikolaus Esterházy II.

=== Music arranged for Harmonie ===
The 18th-century German expression "auf Harmonie setzen" (lit.: set onto Harmonie) means arranging a piece of music for performance by a Harmonie. For instance Der Messias, Mozart's arrangement of Handel's Messiah, included that several movements became "auf Harmonie gesetzt".

== History ==
During the historical period of the Harmonie, the ensemble gradually grew in size. Hellyer (2006) suggests that during the early period, in the 1750s, a Harmonie could consist of just five instruments (two oboes, two horns, and one bassoon), though a second bassoon could be included as well. The Harmonie compositions of Haydn and Mozart (see below) all use at least six instruments.

A later expansion of the Harmonie can be traced with the accession of Joseph II to the throne of the Austrian Empire in 1780. Joseph expanded music-making at his court in a number of ways, including the introduction of a Harmonie, as noted above. This Harmonie consisted of eight players, with two clarinets added to the traditional two oboes, two horns, and two bassoons. Other nobles then followed the Emperor's lead.

The Emperor's Harmonie included some distinguished players, notably the clarinettist Anton Stadler, who was the inspiration for a number of important works by Mozart. It also included Anton's younger brother Johann, as well as the oboist Johann Went, a composer of over 80 works for Harmonie, and oboist/composer Josef Triebensee.

The Harmonie continued as a lively musical tradition until the Napoleonic Wars forced aristocrats to retrench financially, cutting down on the number of musicians they employed. The tradition had been largely abandoned by the mid-1830s.

== Examples of Harmonie music ==
Beethoven: Octet in E♭ major for 2 oboes, 2 clarinets, 2 horns and 2 bassoons, Op. 103
1. Allegro

2. Andante

3. Menuetto

4. Presto
Performed by the Soni Ventorum Wind Quintet with other artists

Some of Joseph Haydn's early works, called divertimenti or Feldpartien, were written for the Harmonie of his first full-time employer, Count Morzin around 1760. Haydn became Vice-Kapellmeister for the Prince Paul Anton Esterházy in 1761, which was the same year that the Prince established a six-member Harmonie; Hellyer suggests that some of Haydn's early works for Harmonie were intended for this ensemble.

Mozart also wrote for Harmonie. As a teenager traveling in Italy, he wrote the early Divertimenti K. 186 and K. 166 (1773); see Divertimenti for ten winds (Mozart). He wrote further divertimenti between 1775 and 1777, while working at the Salzburg court (K. 213, 240, 252, 253, 270).

Some time after his move to Vienna (1781), Mozart wrote his most extended work for Harmonie, the Serenade in B flat, K. 361 (a.k.a. Gran Partita). This is for an amplified wind ensemble of 13 instruments (two oboes, two clarinets, two basset horns, four (French) horns, two bassoons, and a string bass). His E flat serenade of 1781, K. 375, is written for a Harmonie consisting of clarinets, bassoons and horns, curiously mismatching what the new Emperor had arranged as his Harmonie; Hellyer suggests Mozart, who was seeking a job at court at the time, was misinformed. Mozart later revised the work to include two oboe parts.

Perhaps the weightiest of all music for Harmonie is Mozart's Serenade No. 12 for winds in C minor, K. 388, written in 1782 for Joseph II's eight-player Harmonie. Hellyer calls it "a curiously sombre and powerful work which often conveys a mood of dramatic intensity totally alien to the informal background music normally associated with the serenade type."

At the banquet in the finale of Don Giovanni, Mozart has a "Harmonie" perform parts from Una cosa rara by Vicente Martín y Soler, I due litiganti by Giuseppe Sarti and the aria "Non più andrai" from his own The Marriage of Figaro. The scoring is for the full eight-part Harmonie, two each of oboes, clarinets, bassoons, and horns.

== See also ==
- Divertimenti for ten winds (Mozart)
- Serenade No. 10 (Mozart)
- Serenade No. 11 (Mozart)
- Serenade No. 12 (Mozart)
- Octet (Beethoven)
- Serenade for Wind Instruments (Dvořák)
- Petite Symphonie (Gounod)
