= Anton Stadler =

Musical artist (1753–1812)

Anton Paul Stadler
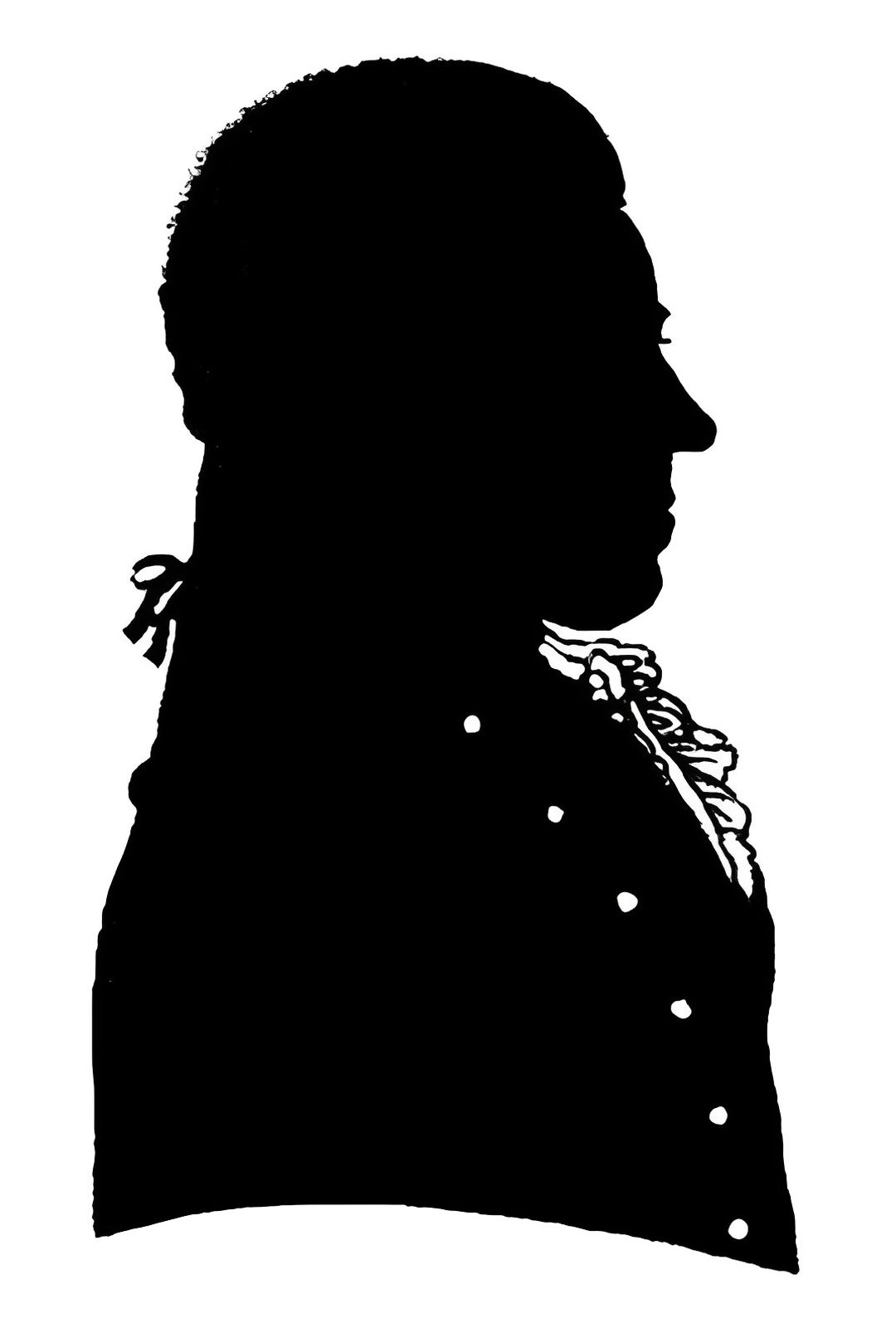
- Silhouette of Anton Stadler

Background information
- Born: 28 June 1753
- Died: 15 June 1812 (aged 58)
- Genre: Classical
- Occupation: Musician
- Instrument: Clarinet

Anton Paul Stadler (28 June 1753, in Bruck an der Leitha – 15 June 1812, in Vienna) was an Austrian clarinet and basset horn player for whom Wolfgang Amadeus Mozart wrote, amongst others, both his Clarinet Quintet (K 581) and Clarinet Concerto (K 622). Stadler's name is inextricably linked to Mozart's compositions for these two instruments.

== Early life and career ==
Stadler was born in 1753 in a small town near Vienna; in 1756 his family moved into the city where his brother Johann was born. Even though both became famous as clarinet and basset horn players, the Journal des Luxus und der Moden described Anton in 1801 as 'a great artist on many wind instruments', and in a letter to Ignatz von Beecke, applying for a position in the Wallerstein orchestra (6 November 1781), Anton himself writes that they 'can also play a little violin and viol'. In the same letter he stated that both he and his brother 'could supplement orchestral skills with duets, concertos, wind octets and basset horn trios', the latter together with Raymund Griesbacher.

A concert on 21 March 1773 at the Kärntnertortheater, of which a programme survived, appears to mark the first public appearance of the two brothers in Vienna; further recorded appearances include a concert on 19 December 1775 and two concerts (12 and 14 March 1780) in which they took part in a concerto for five winds by Joseph Starzer. Pamela Poulin writes:

Until 1782 Anton and Johann held various positions. According to the open account books of the imperial court of 1779 they were hired by the court on a per-service basis. A concert programme of 12 March identifies the brothers as being in the service of Count Carl of Palm. As of October 1780 Anton was employed by the Piaristen religious order of Maria Treu as a 'manorial musician'. In 1781 Anton was in the service of count Dimitri Galizin. In the same year Kaiser Joseph II designated their services as 'indispensable'.

== Stadler and Mozart ==
Mozart's first encounter with Stadler may have been around 1781, following his own move to Vienna. In October 1781 he wrote of the first performance of the sextet version of his E-flat Serenade K 375: "The six gentlemen who executed it are poor beggars who, however, play quite well together, particularly the first clarinet and the two horns." On 8 February 1782 the Stadlers were invited to join the orchestra of the Viennese imperial court, and the following year they were members of the emperor's Harmonie, in which Stadler played second clarinet. Stadler's evident preoccupation with the clarion register(the middle register a clarinet can be played at) is significant in view of Mozart's subsequent exploitation of its idiomatic potential.

The earliest documented evidence of Mozart's connection with Stadler dates from a year or two later. The clarinetist's playing evoked the following response in Johann Friedrich Schink's Litterarische Fragmente:

My thanks to you, brave virtuoso! I have never heard the like of what you contrived with your instrument. Never should I have thought that a clarinet could be capable of imitating the human voice as it was imitated by you. Indeed, your instrument has so soft and lovely a tone that no one can resist it – and I have one, dear Virtuoso; let me thank you. I heard music for wind instruments today, too, by Herr Mozart, in four movements, viz. four horns, two oboes, two bassoons, two clarinets, two basset horns, a double bass, and at each instrument sat a master – oh, what a glorious effect it made – glorious and great, excellent and sublime!

Schink here clearly refers to a performance of Mozart's Serenade for thirteen instruments K 361/370a, which probably formed part of Stadler's benefit concert at the National Court Theatre advertised in the Wienerblättchen of 22 March 1784: "Herr Stadler senior, in present service of His Majesty the Emperor, will hold a musical concert for his own benefit, at which will be given, among other well chosen pieces, a great wind piece of a very special kind composed by Herr Mozart." Barely more than a week after this first documented performance came the première of Mozart's Piano Quintet K 452 on 1 April, which included parts for both composer and clarinettist.

The arrival in Vienna of the Bohemian players Anton David and Vincent Springer proved an important catalyst for Mozart's basset horn writing. They had already generated considerable publicity as early as 1782, when their performance at Ludwigslust 'on largely unknown instruments which they call basset horns' was cited by C.F. Cramer the following year. Mozart's espousal of the basset horn really began in earnest in late 1783 when he produced over a period of two years thirteen works for that instrument:

- the Notturni K 436, 437, 438, 439 and 346/439a
- 25 pieces for three basset horns K 439b
- the Masonic funeral music K 477/479a
- the Adagio in B-flat K 411/484a for two clarinets and three basset horns
- the Adagio in F K 410/484d for two basset horns and bassoon
- a fragment of a Quintet in B-flat for keyboard, oboe, clarinet, basset horn and bassoon (K 452a)
- a fragment of an Allegro assai in B-flat for two clarinets and three basset horns (K 484b), possibly linked to K 411/484a
- a fragment of an Adagio in F for clarinet and three basset horns (K 484c), possibly linked to K 580a
- a fragment of an Allegro in F (K 484e), possibly for basset horn

The latter dates from the end of 1785. This remarkable activity was undoubtedly brought about by the availability of four excellent clarinet and basset horn players – the Stadlers, David and Springer – who in combination must have inspired the scoring of Mozart's Serenade K 361/370a, in addition to more ritualistic works such as the Adagio K 411/484a. Indeed, the basset horn came to be associated with Masonic ritual, for which its special character was ideally suited, and Anton Stadler was admitted to the 'Zum Palmbaum' ('Palm Tree') lodge on 27 September 1785. On 20 October of that year he and Mozart performed at a benefit concert (to pay for David's and Springer's journey home) organised by the Palm Tree and Three Eagles lodges of the Viennese Masonic order, and on 17 November Mozart's most important piece of Masonic music, the Maurerische Trauermusik K 477/479a, was performed during a Lodge of Sorrows for the deaths of two Brothers, Georg August, Duke of Mecklenburg-Strelitz, and Franz, Count Esterhazy of Galántha. For this piece Mozart used an extraordinary and fortuitous collection of musicians: the clarinet part was probably intended for Stadler and the contrabassoon part for Theodor Lotz. The initial scoring also included a single basset horn, but two more were added by Mozart, presumably to allow the participation of David and Springer. Stadler and Mozart appeared again at another benefit concert for the Bohemian pair at the Crowned Hope Lodge on 15 December 1785, for which the items included 'A Parthie [suite] composed by Brother Stadler for six wind instruments, for which the Hon. Brother Locz [sic] will play the great octave bassoon'; Stadler's Partita is no longer extant. Significantly, Mozart wrote nothing further for the basset horn after this concert until 1788, when he produced a piano concerto fragment (K 537b) and the Canzonetta K 549.

Mozart's Clarinet Trio K 498 was written for the pianist Francesca von Jacquin and must have been first played at the family house, with the participation of Stadler and the composer himself. It undoubtedly reflects the favourite techniques and idioms of each of the players, including Stadler's proficiency in the chalumeau register, as illustrated by accompaniment figuration and melodic figures including that part of the compass.

Mozart's opera La clemenza di Tito (K 621) was first heard in Prague on 6 September 1791. Although the orchestra was that of the Estates Theatre, Stadler travelled to Prague with Mozart, who included two arias with major solos for him: Sesto's "Parto, parto", which has a large basset clarinet solo, and Vitellia's "Non più di fiori", which has a basset horn solo of equal prominence.

Although the eloquence of Mozart's clarinet writing for Stadler testifies to a remarkable musical relationship, surviving evidence of their personal friendship remains fragmentary. In any case, Mozart's nickname for the clarinettist reveals a shared sense of humour; 'Notschibinitschibi' is a combination of two words – 'Notschibi' meaning a poor booby or miser and 'Nitschibi' a young man of follies. Still, much evidence remains to show that Stadler was at best irresponsible, and at worst, conniving. Constanze Mozart's sister, Sophie Haibel, recounted to Georg Nikolaus von Nissen how Stadler stole from Mozart, and a letter from Constanze to the publisher Johann André suggests that she and others held no high opinion of him. Furthermore, although Theodor Lotz made Stadler's basset clarinets (see below), Stadler later attributed their invention to himself, taking advantage of Lotz's premature death in 1792, only six months after Mozart's. Stadler never paid for the instruments, nor for K 622, which Nissen claims was commissioned from Mozart. It is distressing to see to what extent Mozart involved Stadler in his personal life and finances, considering how often the composer himself was in debt.

== Stadler and the basset clarinet ==
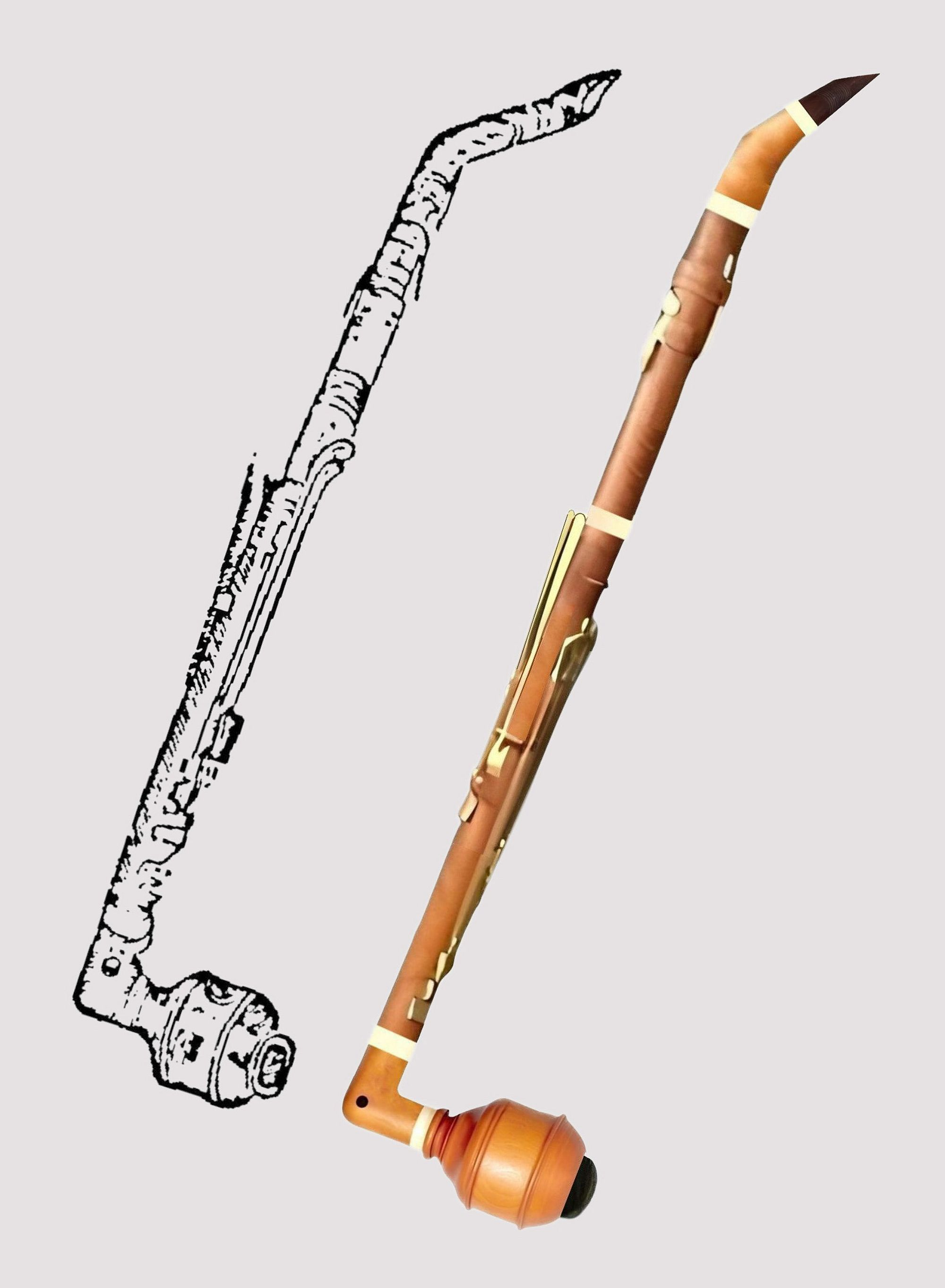
Sketch of Stadler's basset clarinet; some clarinetists turn the bell forwards (towards the audience).

A surviving programme for a concert on 20 February 1788 documents an important milestone in the history of Stadler and Mozart, heralding the arrival of a newly extended clarinet. It announces a concert at the Hoftheater at which

Herr Stadler the elder, in the service of his majesty the Kaiser, will play a concerto on the Bass-Klarinet and a variation on the Bass-Klarinet, an instrument of new invention and manufacture of the court instrument maker Theodor Loz [sic]; this instrument has two more tones than the normal clarinet.

Stadler's instrument is now known as a basset clarinet, a term coined by Jiři Kratochvil to reflect its kinship with the basset horn and to avoid confusion with the bass clarinet, whose orchestral career developed only during the 19th century. As for the variations advertised in Stadler's 1788 programme, a number of works have so far been identified, including Variations on different favourite themes and ten variations on You must not take amiss with me. A possible candidate for the other clarinet work might be another of Stadler's compositions, or perhaps a B-flat major Concerto attributed to Joseph Michl.

The "two more tones than the normal clarinet [the compass of which ends at low e]" mentioned in the concert programme can, however, not easily be unambiguously identified. The Lotz basset clarinet must be associated with Mozart's Quintet fragment in B-flat K 516c, 93 bars of a movement which in 1828 Nissen believed to have been originally complete. Basset notes occur only from bar 55, d then occurring 7 times, occasioning notation in the bass clef an octave below pitch, as in Mozart's basset horn writing. Similarly, the second clarinet part of Ferrando's aria 'Ah lo veggio' from Così fan tutte descends to d on a total of 7 occasions. Mozart's avoidance of the tonic c has led some writers to assume that d and e-flat were the extra notes on Lotz's instrument, but the obvious parallel with the basset horn makes c and d much more likely: Robert D. Levin reconstructed K 516c and believes that the missing portion must have contained several examples of low c.

It was for this extended clarinet that the Clarinet Concerto and possibly the Quintet for Clarinet and Strings were written. A concerto in D major for basset clarinet was written for Stadler by Franz Xaver Süssmayr, which remains as two incomplete manuscripts. It is now thought that the clarinet concerti by Joseph Leopold Eybler and Leopold Kozeluch were also written for Anton Stadler.

== Later life and career ==
In a letter to Constanze from October 1791 Mozart writes of completing the final movement of K 622 ('Stadler's Rondo') and Stadler set out on a concert tour that lasted about four years, during which time he visited at least nine cities, performing more than a dozen times:

- Prague, 16 October 1791
- Berlin, 31 January and 23 March 1792
- Warsaw, 4 May and 11 September 1792
- Vilniu, 1793
- Riga, 27 February 5 and 21 March 1794
- St Petersburg, 13 May 1794
- Lübeck, 16 and 27 September 1794
- Hamburg, 29 November and 20 December 1794
- Hannover, 12 September 1795

Making use of his status as a Royal Imperial Court Musician from Vienna he presumably also gave lessons. Reviews of Stadler's playing are generally flattering, such as comments in the Berlin Musikalisches Wochenblatt of 1792, where he is described as 'brilliant and accomplished; he also has acquired a precision which shows his confidence'.

By 1796 Stadler had returned to Vienna, taking up his post alongside his brother, and starting composing works for basset horn and clarinet, a number of which were published. In 1798 the Viennese composer Joseph Leopold Eybler complete a clarinet concerto, very probably for Anton Stadler, a fine three-movement work with a full orchestra complete with Harmonie (including clarinets), trumpets and timpani, in which the tutti sections demonstrate Eybler's fine compositional technique. In the concerto manuscript, two versions of the solo part are written on separate staves: they vary in their technical demands and it seems a player may have found the upper line too difficult (most of the passage work lies in the extreme high register, up to a^{3}) and persuaded the composer to make a simplified version.

Stadler was invited by a Hungarian count, Georg Festitics, to help organize a school of music in Keszthely near the Plattensee. The result, Stadler's 50-page Musick Plan of 1800, represents a thoughtful and organized side of Stadler one might not have suspected to exist (the original is preserved in the National Hungarian Library in Budapest). The document, based on a set of questions provided by the count, recommends a rigorous education, combining performance, music theory and composition with schooling in a broad range of subjects. Examples of Stadler's priorities include study of the violin, singing and piano (also requiring students to learn to tune a piano), a 'general education' (because otherwise one becomes a 'half thing'), as well as an understanding of the psychology of performance. He also has wise words on how to behave in the profession, suggesting instrumentalists 'not to drown out singers, not hold back or press forward in tempo, not publicly censure another's chance mistake, nor ridicule their colleagues'. A list of repertoire and theoretical texts is found at the end of the document, and includes mention of a forthcoming method for the clarinet, to be written by Stadler himself. The Musick Plan serves to habilitate Stadler's reputation, at least partially.

After his four-year tour he left his wife for a young seamstress, Friederika Kabel, with whom he remained for the rest of his life. No doubt he spent money irresponsibly and continued to incur debts. He died of emaciation and was buried on 17 June 1812 on the old Catholic cemetery in Matzleinsdorf.

== Works ==
The following list was compiled by Albert Rice.

For clarinet:

- Trois caprices pour la clarinette seule (published in Vienna ca. 1808 and dedicated to Count Johann Esterházy, Master of the Crowned Hope Lodge and a clarinet student of Stadler's)
- Trois fantaisies ou potpourris pour la clarinette seule (published in Vienna ca. 1809)
- Variations sur différents themes favorites (Variations on different favourite themes) pour la clarinette seule (published in Vienna ca. 1810)
- Six Duettinos progressives pour 2 Clarinettes (published in Vienna ca. 1808)
- 6 Duettinos concertantes pour 2 clarinettes (published in Vienna)
- 12 ländlerische Tänze für 2 Clarinettes (lost)
- 10 Variations über "Müsst ma nix in übel aufnehma" (You must not take amiss with me) für Clarinette (lost)

For basset horn:

- 18 Terzetten für 3 Bassetthörner. A notable recording is that by the Trio di Bassetto (Jean-Claude Veilhan, Eric Lorho & Jean-Louis Gauch) on period basset horns in F by L. Verjat (Paris) after A. Kirst (Potsdam) & Gilles Thomé (Paris) after R. Griesbacher (Vienna); K617 K617060 (1995).

For czakan:

- 6 Duettinos pour 2 Csákans ou csákan et Violon (nos. 1 and 2 published in Vienna in 1808)
- 7 Variations pour Csákan (published in Vienna ca. 1812)
- 7 Variations pour Csákan (published in Vienna ca. 1812)
- 9 Variations über "Müsst ma nix in übel aufnehma" für Csákan (lost)
- 3 Caprices pour Csákan ou Flûte double (lost)

For wind ensemble:

- 2 Märsche (lost)
- 12 deutsche Tänze mit Trios (lost)
