= List of compositions by Anton Diabelli =

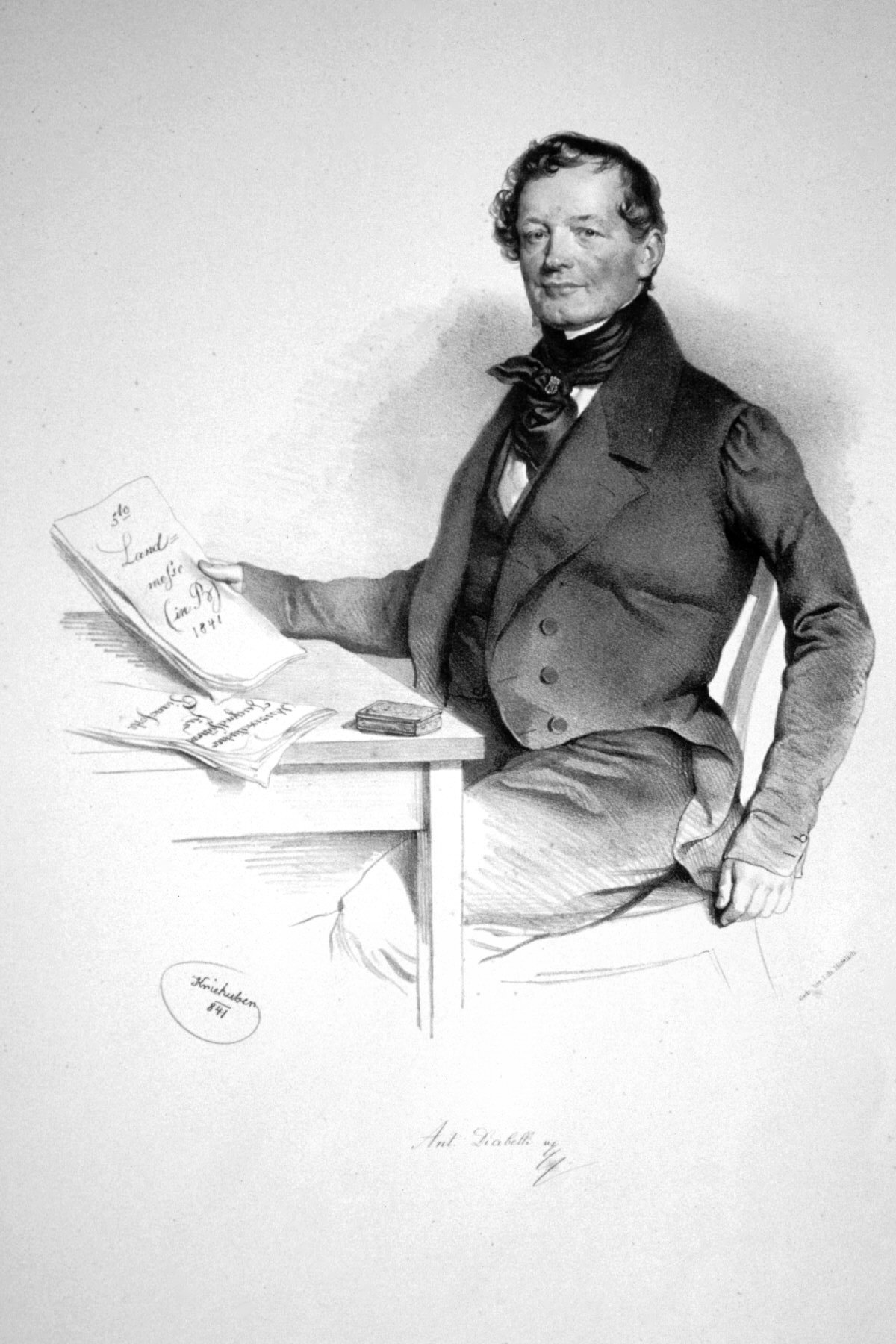
Anton Diabelli, lithograph by Josef Kriehuber, 1841

This is a list of compositions by Anton Diabelli.

== Music for piano ==
=== Two hands ===
- The First Lessons on the Piano, Op. 125
- Le bouquetier, Op. 151
- 100 Cadenzas, Op. 154
- Sonatinas, Op. 168
- Allegretto in C major
- Glorreiche Rückkehr Franz des Allgeliebten
- 2 Potpourris aus "Rigoletto"
- Waterloo Tänze

=== Four hands ===
- Melodic Practice Pieces, Op. 149
- Sonatas, Op. 32, Op. 33, Op. 37, Op. 38, Op. 54, Op. 58, Op. 60, and Op. 73
- 2 Cute Sonatas and Military Rondo, Op. 150
- "The Friends Of The Children"; six easy sonatinas, Op. 163
- Sonatinas, Op. 24, Op. 50, Op. 53, Op. 85, Op. 117 and Op. 152

== Music for guitar ==
=== One guitar ===
- Funeral March for the Death of Michael Haydn, Op. 20 PDF
- Sonata in C major, Op. 29, No. 1
- Sonata in A major, Op. 29, No. 2
- Sonata in F major, Op. 29, No. 3
- Recital Piece for Amateurs, Op. 39
- Two Rondos and Two Fugues, Op. 46
- 10 Light Pieces, Op. 89
- 7 Preludes, Op. 103 (before 1829) PDF
- Gran Variazioni sopra la cavatina dell’ Opera Tancredi, Op. 104
- 12 Light Ländler, Op. 121
- 12 Country Dances, Op. 127
- Apollo am Damentoilette PDF
- Amusements pour les Dames PDF
- 24 Light Old-Vienna Ländler
- 5 Viennese Dances
- 4 Rondinos

=== Two guitars ===
- Orpheus, Op. 12 PDF
  - Romance (La Sentinelle)
  - Romance (Partant pour la Syrie)
  - Romance (Vous me quittez)
  - Russiches Volklied (Schöne Minka ich muss scheiden)
  - Melodie (Im Arm der Liebe ruht sichs so wohl)
  - Melodie (An Alexis send' ich dich)
  - Melodie (Nimm diess kleine Angedenken)
- Variations on a Favorite Theme, Op. 57
- Serenade No. 3, Op. 63 PDF
- 4th Serenade, Op. 96
- Great Serenade, Op. 100
- Cycle On "La Gazza Ladra" By Rossini

=== Three guitars ===
- Trio in F major, Op. 62

=== Guitar and piano ===
- 3 Pieces for guitar and fortepiano, Op. 10
- Sonatina, Op. 68 and Op. 70 (or for violin and piano)
- Sonata, Op. 71
- Variations sur un theme favori de Rode, Op. 97
- Grande Sonate brillante, Op. 102
- 4 Leichte und angenehme Rondino, Op. 140
- 6 Ecossaises
- Pezzi Facili
- Andante con Espressione

=== Guitar and other instruments ===
- Serenade for flute and guitar, Op. 99
- Serenata Concertante for flute or violin and viola or guitar, Op. 105
- Notturno for csakan, viola & guitar, Op. 123
- Notturno, for clarinet & guitar
- Duo in A major for violin and guitar
- Duo in D major for violin and guitar
- 6 Original Austrian Folk Songs for csakan and guitar
- 3 pieces for flute and guitar
- Potpourri No. 1 from the Favorite Works of Beethoven for flute (or violin) & guitar
- Trio for 2 violins and guitar

=== Guitar and voice ===
- 4 Songs
  1. Music
  2. Homage
  3. Memory
  4. People's Destiny

== Music for voice ==
- "Sechs charakteristische Gesänge", Op. 91 for Voice, Flute and Guitar
- "Lieder der Liebe und Zärtlichkeit", Op. 98 for Voice, Flute and Guitar
- "Gesänge Für Herz und Gefühl", Op. 101 for Voice, Flute and Guitar
- Country Mass in E-flat major for Solos, Chorus, and Orchestra, Op. 107
- Pastoral Mass in F major for Solos, Chorus, and Orchestra, Op. 147
- Mass in C major for Chorus, Two trumpets, Two Violins, and Figured Bass
- Mass in B major with A "Jubilate Deo" Offertory for Chorus, Two Violins, and Figured Bass
- Mass in G major for Solos, Chorus, and Orchestra
- "Jubilate Deo Omnis Terra" for Chorus, Two Violins, and Figured Bass
- "Puer Natus Est Nobis"; gradual for chorus and orchestra
- "Angelus Ad Pastores"; motet for soprano, chorus, and orchestra
- "Prope Est Dominus" for Chorus, Strings, and Organ, Op. 166
- "Cantate Domino" for Chorus, Two Violins, and Figured Bass
- "The Mayor Election" for Five Male Voices and Strings
- "In te Domine speravi", for chorus, orchestra
- "Virgo Maria", for chorus, orchestra & organ

== Miscellaneous ==
- Grand Cello Sonata, Op. 92
- Heroic Music for 6 trumpets and timpani
- 12 Processional Fanfares for trumpet & timpani
- Rossini Waltzes of Favorite Themes from "The Barber of Seville," for 2 violins & double bass
- 6 Walzer für den Karneval, for 2 violins and double bass
- Viennese Dance for orchestra
