= K213 =

K213 or K-213 may refer to:

- K-213 (Kansas highway), a former state highway in Kansas
- HMS Poppy (K213), a former UK Royal Navy ship
- Divertimento No. 8 for winds in F major by Mozart, K.213
