= Ungerberg Bunker Complex =

Austrian Cold War bunker in Eastern Austria

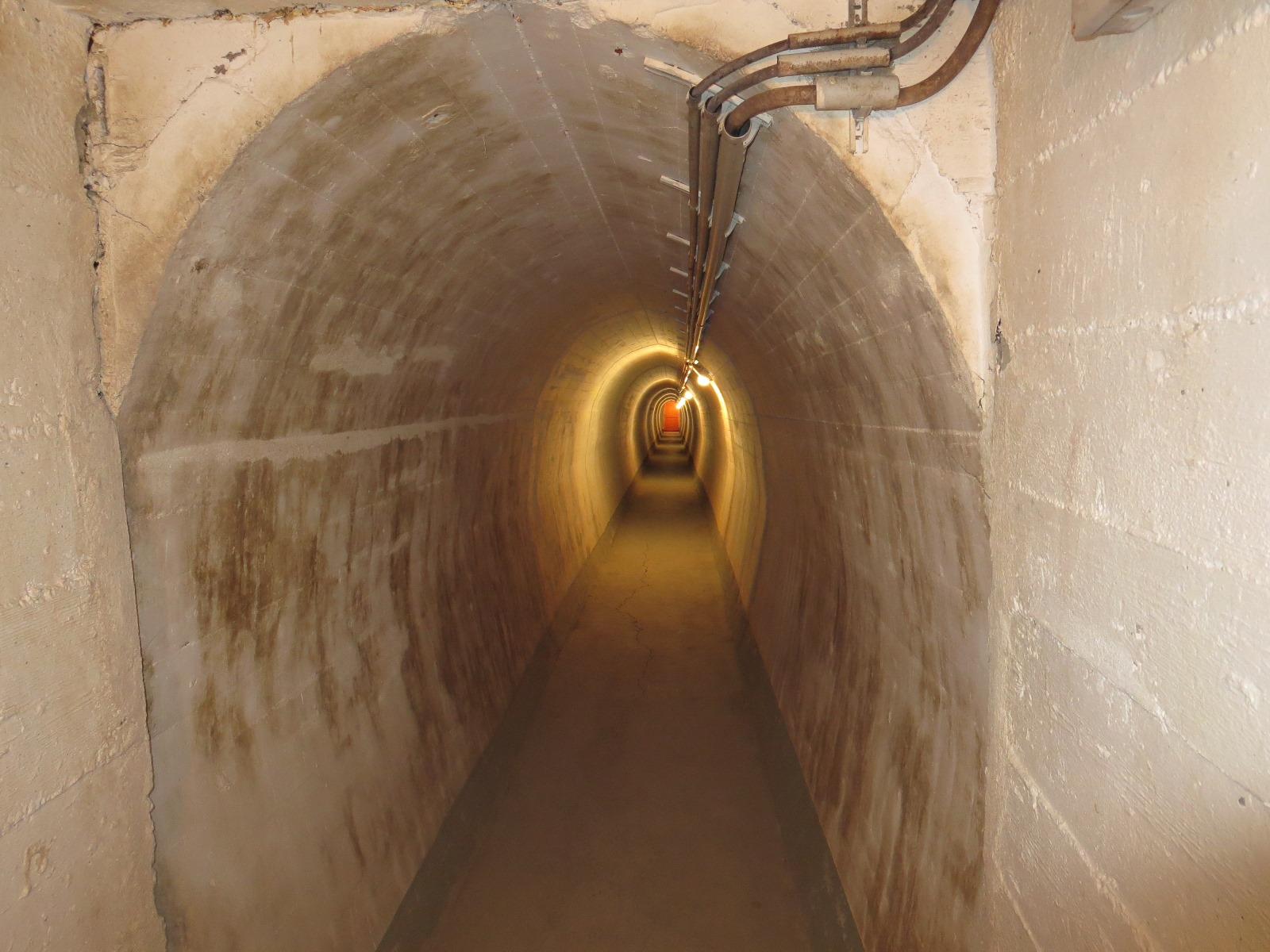
A heavily reinforced concrete tunnel in the bunker complex.

The Ungerberg Bunker Complex is an Austrian fortification located in Bruckneudorf, Austria, 30 minutes east of Vienna, the capital of Austria. The bunker is designated U3, and is part of the Schleinzer Wall which was meant to stop a Soviet invasion. Today the bunker is a museum.

== Description ==
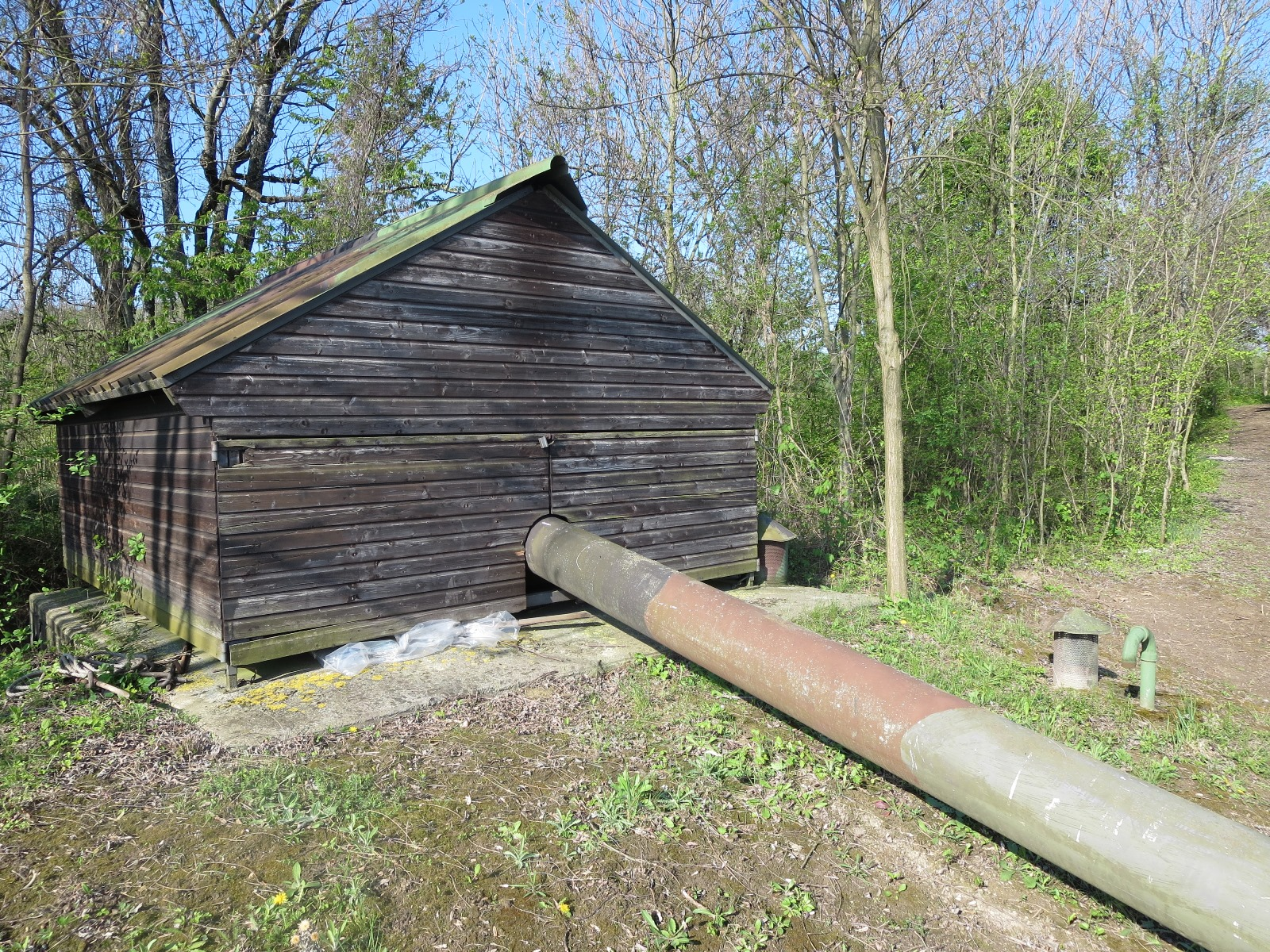
A covered Centurion tank turret with its fake covering.

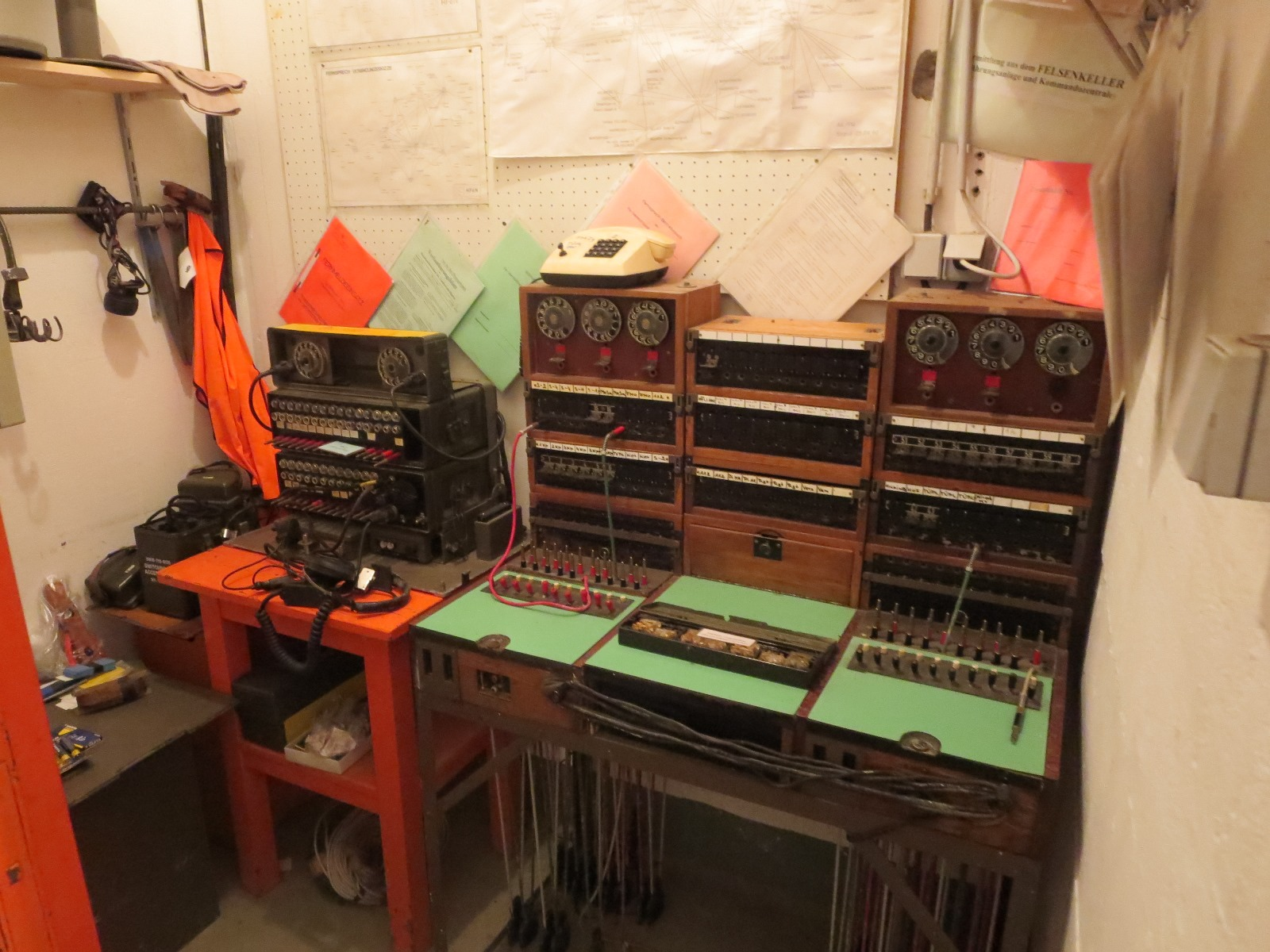
The restored telephone room.

The Ungerberg Bunker Complex was crewed by 40 men, which were accommodated within the bunker. The bunker is the 3rd largest bunker in Austria today. The bunker was equipped with 2 Centurion Tank turrets, a 10.5 cm 18/40 howitzer, an armored machine gun dome, and an observation dome. The Centurion tank turrets were emplaced in steel-concrete mounts, and were covered by fake buildings. These buildings were made to fold down and provide the turret complete mobility. These types of tank turrets with the fake buildings are also commonly found in Switzerland. The armored MG dome was armed with a Nazi German MG 42, but the gun was rechambered with a 7.62×51mm NATO cartridge. Beside the heavy armament, the bunker was also meant to withstand heavy artillery, as the walls were 2.5m of concrete with steel reinforcements. The bunker was also equipped with a medical room, niches in the walls for coffins, a telephone room, accommodations for the men occupying the bunker, a generator, and a kitchen and storeroom. The storeroom was large enough to feed 45 men for 25 days.

== History ==
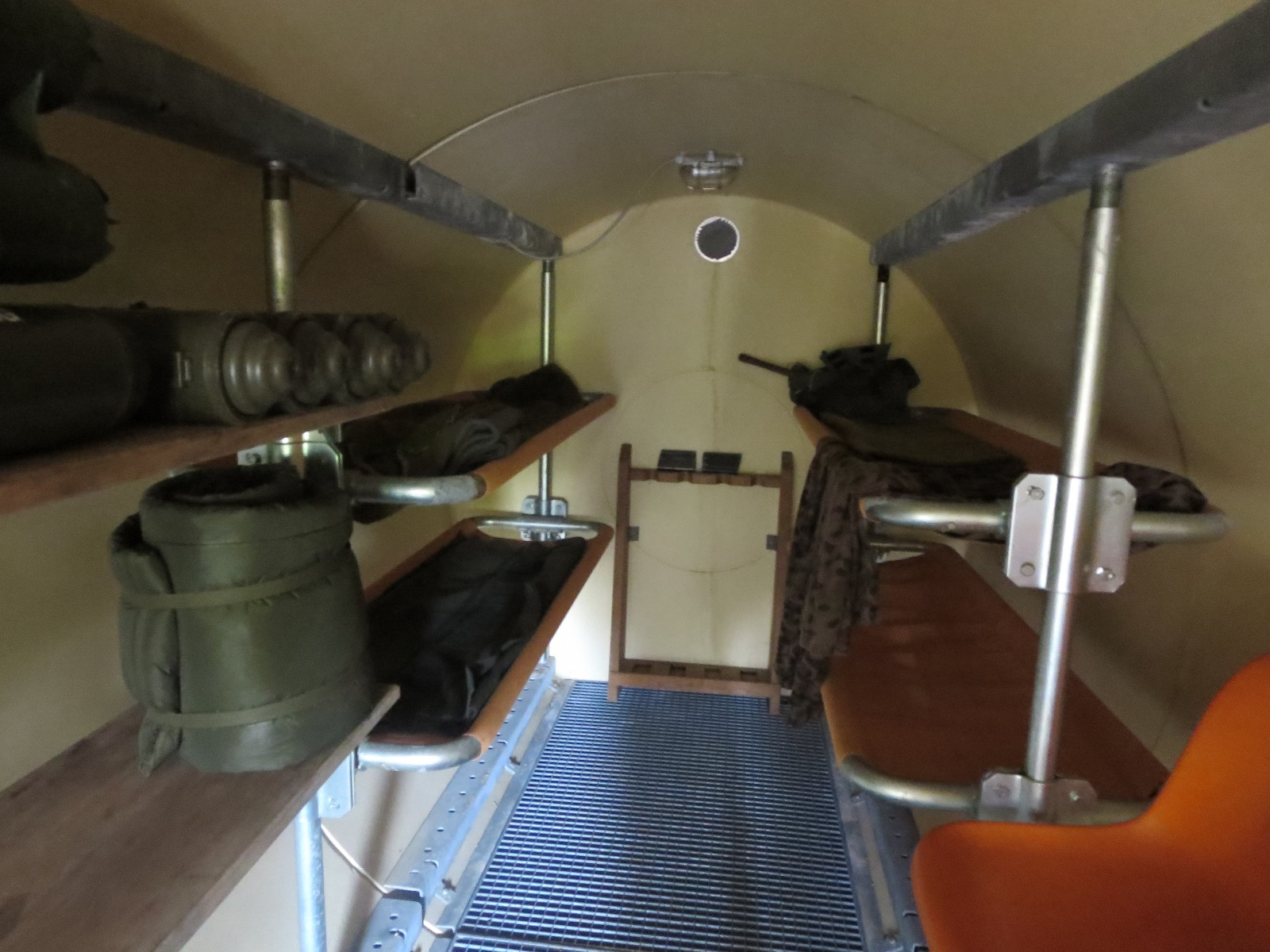
Part of the museum. the bunker complex has been completely restored to the way it was when it was built in the early 1960s.

The Ungerberg Bunker Complex was constructed between 1960 and 1964. The bunker is part of the Schleinzer Wall, named after the Minister of Defense between 1961 and 1964, Karl Schleinzer. The bunker was constructed to prevent a Soviet armored attack down the B10 highway which leads to Vienna, the capital of Austria. The bunker was considered the first line of defense against an attack from the east, so it was kept highly secret. The bunker was kept so secret that many locals didn't know it existed until it was decommissioned in 1993. After the fall of the Iron Curtain in the early 1990s, the Ungerberg Bunker Complex was decommissioned. It sat dormant for a few years, occasionally being used by hunters or by the Austrian army during maneuvers. Since Sept. 21, 2014, the bunker complex has been a branch museum of the Army History Museum/Military Historical Institute.

== See also ==
- Nauders roadblock
- Wurzen Pass
- Austrian Armed Forces
