= Divertimenti for six winds (Mozart) =

1770s works by Wolfgang Amadeus Mozart

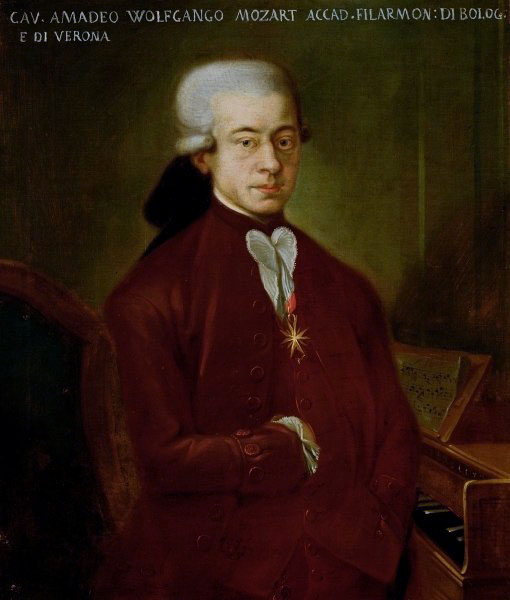
1777 portrait of Mozart

The Divertimenti in F major (K. 213), B♭ major (K. 240), E♭ major (K. 252/240a), F major (K. 253), and B♭ major (K. 270) are five companion compositions for pairs of oboes, horns and bassoons by Wolfgang Amadeus Mozart.

== Background ==
The five wind sextets K. 213, 240, 252/240a, 253, and 270 have historically been regarded as a series of five Tafelmusik (dinner music) works for the Salzburg court. In relation to this, the periodicity in the datings of January and July/August of the years 1775 to 1777, present on the autographs of four of them, is striking. If it is true that the pieces were written as Tafelmusik for the Archbishop of Salzburg, Hieronymus von Colloredo, then there must have been specific and regularly recurring events every winter and summer accounting for this pattern; so far, though, none have been found. Even though in the Anstellungsdekret für Joseph Fiala [the decree of appointment for Joseph Fiala, currently in the Salzburg State Archives], issued by the Archbishop on 1 November 1778, one reads

According to which we most graciously receive and welcome the supplicant into our service, subject to his good conduct, as first oboist, in order that the same, both in the Cathedral and at Court or elsewhere as we may require him, should participate diligently in the music and once again bring the wind instruments to that condition which they formerly had, so that they can perform at our command music with wind instruments at table ...

no documents containing definite groups of musicians or concrete commissions for music have been found. The two summer datings of July and August could perhaps be linked to the semester holidays at the university at which time the students were responsible for the Finalmusik played at the summer residence of the Prince Archbishop, amongst others. For the two January dates, however, possible occasions of this kind have not been identified.

The sequences of keys within the group of five is also striking: F major/B♭ major/E♭ major for K. 213, 240 and 252/240a, and F major/B♭ major for K. 253 and 270. This two-fold occurrence of adjacent keys in the circle of fifths suitable for wind instruments may have been conceived with something of a pedagogical intention, most likely by Leopold Mozart. The apparent absence of an additional divertimento in E♭ major to complete a set of six (the usual number needed for publication) led early musicologists, including Alfred Einstein, to believe that the Divertimento in E♭ major K. 289/271g was also part of the set, but the latter's authenticity is now in considerable doubt (see below). Within the five works the sequence of keys throughout the movements is quite regular. The slow movements (in K. 252/240a this would be the Polonaise) are in either the dominant or subdominant key, while all the others are in the principal key. The Trios of the Menuetti are in the subdominant key, except for that of K. 240 which is the related minor key.

The designation divertimento found on each of the autographs is in Leopold Mozart's hand. This and the fact that he numbered the pieces from I to V is a strong indication that he wanted to have the pieces printed. The five divertimenti were, however, never published during the Mozarts' lifetimes, perhaps due to the missing sixth piece. After Mozart's death, Georg Nikolaus von Nissen changed the numbering fixed by Leopold and placed one of the divertimenti for ten winds, K. 166/159d, in front of the sextets. Apparently, Johann Anton André was not misled by this and he published a very carefully prepared set of parts in the original order in 1801.

The Neue Mozart-Ausgabe (NMA) states that the five sextets have been underestimated in both the literature and musical practice: they are seldom performed in concert programs and the relevant literature usually mentions them only briefly without any detailed examination. This underestimation is most likely mainly due to the notion that, as mere "table music", the divertimenti are musically too superficial to deserve the attention the rest of Mozart's oeuvre does. Taking into account the restricted technical capabilities of the wind instruments featured here, these divertimenti can stand comparison with the Italian string quartets from the point of view of both compositional technique and richness of invention. The rich palette of tone colours associated with the oboes, horns and bassoons actually gives these works a particular sound not found in the works for strings. Roger Hellyer notes that "these divertimenti are also formally unconventional. Not one of them had the standard five movements. The third begins with a slow movement, an aria for the first oboe, while the fourth, limited to three movements only, opens with a theme with six variations wherein Mozart delighted in exploiting the full range of tonal possibilities of his ensemble".

These five divertimenti clearly comprise the second stage in Mozart's development as a composer of wind music, the first consisting of the two divertimenti for ten winds (K. 186/159b and 166/159d), and the third of the large-scale serenades, K. 361/370a, 375, and 388/384a, written in Vienna. The slightly gauche effects of K. 186/159b and 166/159d, in which writing in thirds or sixths prevails, have been replaced in these five sextets by a greater mastery of the material which shows itself mainly in the considerably more developed independence of the six voices. Indeed, the first bassoon has been freed from its part as an additional bass instrument and has been transformed into a second solo voice.

== Divertimento in F major, K. 213 ==
The autograph is preserved in the Jagiellonian Library in Kraków and is dated July 1775. The work consists of the following four movements:

1. Allegro spiritoso
2. Andante
3. Menuetto with Trio
4. Contredanse en Rondeau (Molto allegro)

This first sextet is the least sophisticated of the set. The Allegro spiritoso is in sonata form but the development section is quite brief. The subsequent Andante has a ternary structure and sees the first oboe paired with the first bassoon, and the second oboe briefly with the second bassoon. The Trio is a Ländler. The most important feature of the final Contredanse en Rondeau are the horns which are given the opportunity to shine as soloists on several occasions.

== Divertimento in B♭ major, K. 240 ==
The autograph is preserved in the Jagiellonian Library in Kraków and is dated January 1776. The work consists of the following four movements:

1. Allegro
2. Andante grazioso
3. Menuetto with Trio
4. Allegro

The opening Allegro is more elaborate than the corresponding movement in K. 213 with a fuller second subject and a recapitulation starting in the middle of the first subject; the formal repetition of the opening statement is reserved for the very end of the movement. The Menuetto is quite striking due to the droning second oboe during the opening statement and the dotted rhythms the different voices seem to be teasing each other with during the repeat of this statement. The Allegro finale is in sonata form and more rhythmic than melodic, save for the gentle C minor second subject first presented by the first oboe and then repeated, an octave lower, by the first bassoon. According to the explicit indication in the autograph the horns in K. 240 are corni alti in B [high horns in B♭].

== Divertimento in E♭ major, K. 252/240a ==
The autograph is preserved in the Jagiellonian Library in Kraków and is undated; Wolfgang Plath deduced a date "probably between January and August 1776" placing it somewhere between K. 240 and 253, but its date of composition cannot be fixed more precisely than this, even with the help of calligraphic examination. The work consists of the following four movements:

1. Andante
2. Menuetto with Trio
3. Polonaise (Andante)
4. Presto assai

The third divertimento in the series sets itself apart from the other four by opening with a lazy Andante in 6/8 time with an unusual number of dynamic marks. In the Menuetto the first horn is prominently brought to the foreground; the subsequent Trio is in the solemn key of A♭ major. Polonaises rarely occur in Mozart's music (an exception is a movement in the fifth divertimento of K. 439b, for three basset horns); in K. 252/240a the dance has an unusual swagger and a very brief coda. The brilliant Presto assai is based on the Austria tune Die Katze lasst das Mausen nicht.

== Divertimento in F major, K. 253 ==
The autograph is preserved in the Jagiellonian Library in Kraków and is dated August 1776. The work consists of the following three movements:

1. Thema mit 6 Variationen (Andante-Adagio-Allegretto)
2. Menuetto with Trio
3. Allegro assai

The syncopated Andante theme of the initial movement could be a creation of Mozart himself and in the subsequent variations the composer entrusts solo tasks to all three pairs of instruments, including the horns. In the first, the first oboe present a broken-down version of the theme with limited contributions of second oboe and first bassoon. The second has the theme in the first oboe supported by a dialogue between second oboe and second bassoon in triplets. In the third, first oboe and first bassoon present the melody in octaves, while the fourth combines both oboes and both horns in the reworked theme with both bassoons in frantic 32nd-note figurations below. The fifth is the customary Adagio variation displaying a legato line and great clarity. The sixth constitutes the reprise of the Andante theme but played Allegretto: at the end of the fifth variation the autograph mentions variatio 6:^{ta} il thema ma allegretto. The calm Trio contrasts the more noble and expressive Menuetto. The ternary Allegro assai opens with a bold unisono statement and closes with a coda.

== Divertimento in B♭ major, K. 270 ==
The autograph is preserved in the Jagiellonian Library in Kraków and is dated January 1777. The work consists of the following four movements:

1. Allegro molto
2. Andantino
3. Menuetto (Moderato) with Trio
4. Presto

The fifth and final divertimento is the most sophisticated of the set. The Allegro molto is in full sonata form with a development section and a varied repeat in the recapitulation. The Andantino is a gavotte with a tiny but delightful three-beat canonic episode between first oboe and second bassoon at the beginning; the coda features four bars of Alberti-bass accompaniment for the first horn bringing the latter to prominence. The Menuetto carries the specific indication of moderato and features a peculiar hiccup in the second bar; the Trio is a Ländler. The Presto is an uncompromising 3/8 gigue featuring a brief moment of glory for the first bassoon in the coda. Although the explicit indication is missing from the autograph the horns in K. 270 are corni alti in B [high horns in B♭].

== Divertimento in E♭ major, K. 289/271g ==
K. 289/271g comes down to us only via parts and score copies, all dating from the second half of the 19th century and attributed to Mozart, but no autograph is known. Based on its structure, however, it is highly unlikely that it was actually composed by Mozart: the decidedly incompetent writing including many consecutive fifths and octaves, sometimes involving even the outer parts, the constant motion in parallel thirds and comparative lack of imagination in the use of the horns, speaks against the authenticity of the piece. The NMA presents it as a work of dubious authenticity, and, most likely for this reason, it is generally not included in performances or recordings of the set of five.

== Notable recordings ==
- Ensemble Zefiro: Alfredo Bernardini and Paolo Grazzi on 2-key period oboes by Bernardini & Ceccolini (1994) after Grundmann & Floth (Dresden, ca. 1790), Raul Diaz and Dileno Baldin on natural horns by Paxman (1985) after Raoux (Paris, ca. 1800) and by A. Jungwirth (1991) after Courtois (Paris, ca. 1820), and Alberto Grazzi and Josep Borras on period bassoons by Prudent Thierrot (Paris, ca. 1770) and Rust (Lyon, ca. 1790); Auvidis Astree E 8529 (1995).
