= Josef Triebensee =

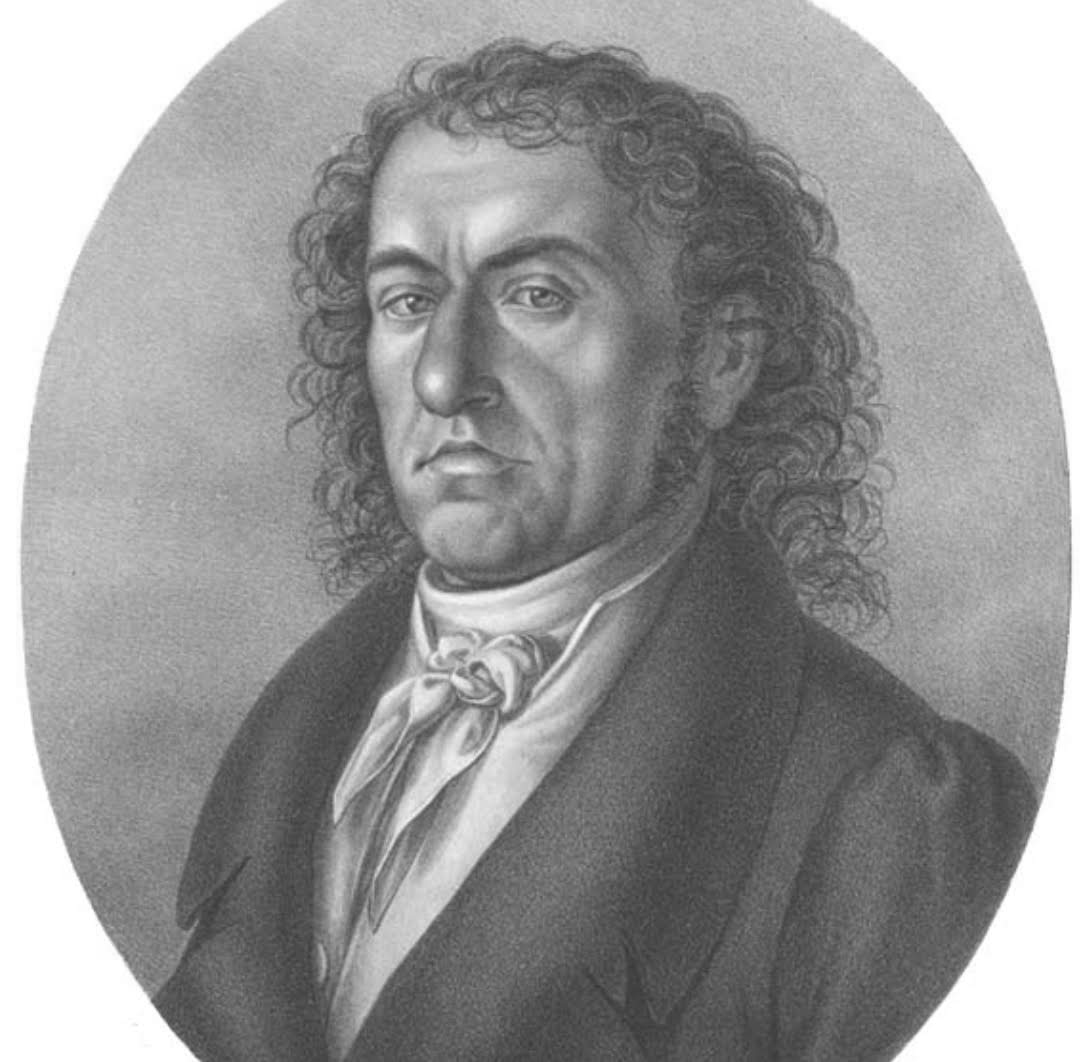
Triebensee portrait

Josef Triebensee (also written Trübensee; 21 November 1772 – 22 April 1846) was a Czech-Austrian composer and oboist.

== Life ==
Triebensee was born on 21 November 1772 in Třeboň in Bohemia. He studied composition with Johann Georg Albrechtsberger and oboe with his father, Georg Triebensee (1746–1813) who served in the private orchestra of Prince Schwarzenberg, and then from 1782 to 1806 as first oboist of the Austrian Emperor's Harmonie (wind band). Concurrently, he also served as principal oboist at the Burgtheater in Vienna with Johann Went playing 2nd oboe. Josef II had basically poached the principal oboe, principal cor anglais and principal bassoonist from the Schwarzenberg Harmonie (founded 1771) to head up his own Harmonie.

Triebensee was the second oboist, with Olivier Hue, at the Theater auf der Wieden in Vienna in 1791 when he played in the premiere of Mozart's Die Zauberflöte—explaining the peculiar difficulty of the second oboe parts in that work. He then became second oboist at the Kärntnertortheater in 1793 moving up to 1st oboe in 1794. He was also 1st Oboe in Prince Liechtenstein's Harmonie at Feldsberg, and in 1796 became its Kapellmeister.

In 1796, Triebensee played 2nd oboe to his father who was on 1st oboe playing in the National Theatre Orchestra in Vienna. The Jahrbuch de Tonkunst in Wien und Prag declared "The Triebensees in the National Theatre Orchestra, father and son, are two great Artistes on the Oboe, which they also play with a most soulful feeling. The son has also written some beautiful compositions, principally for Harmonie music."

In 1809, Triebensee left Prince Lichtenstein's Harmonie when it was disbanded. In 1811, he joined the private orchestra of Count Hunyady, whilst also working as a theatre composer in Brno. From 1816 to his retirement in 1836, he was director of the Prague Opera, where he succeeded composer Carl Maria von Weber. Unlike Weber, his operas found little success. In this period he often played as soloist in the concerts of the Tonkünstler Societät.

In January 1816, Triebensee performed his own 'Variations on the beloved melody "Redoute Deutschen" for Oboe and Orchestra. From 1817 until his retirement in 1836, he was appointed senior Professor of Singing at Prague Conservatory. In 1816, Triebensee succeeded Weber as Director of Prague Opera, a position that he held until his retirement in 1836. He died in Prague on 22 April 1846.

Triebensee's most important compositions were two sets of Harmoniemusik, the second appearing in 32 installments of ten or more movements. He wrote 12 comic operas for Vienna and Prague as well as vocal, orchestral, and chamber works.

== Compositions ==
=== Works for Winds ===
Chamber music

- Grande Sonate for piano and violin (C. F. Whistling p.318
- Sonate pour le Piano-Forte. Composée et dediée à Son Altesse Mademoiselle La Princesse Julis de Sulkowsky published in 2020 by Musica Aeterna Verlag/ Germany (http://www.musica-aeterna.de/Katalog.htm)
- 1790–96 Trio in F major, for two oboes and alto oboe [English horn]
- 1790–96 Trio in C major, for two oboes and alto oboe
- 1790–96 Trio in B♭ major, for two oboes and alto oboe
- 1790–96 Variations on Hadyn's symphony nr. 94 „mit dem Paukenschlag“, for two oboes and alto oboe
- 3 Oboe Quartets for Oboe and String Trio
- Grand Sonata for Oboe and Piano
- Gran Quintuor, for piano, clarinet, alto oboe, basset horn, and bassoon
- Quintetto. In F : a Clavicembalo, Oboa, Violino, Viola e Violoncello(A-Wien Mus.Hs.11409 Mus)
- Quintett in Eb 1799 for strings (A-Wien S.m. 11517)

Menuetto con Variazioni in F

- Variace na Mozartovo téma
- 6 Variationen über das tyroler Alpenlied for piano, violin and guitar (AMZ 1811, Intelligenzblatt)

=== Arrangements for Harmonie ensemble ===
- Joseph Haydn (1732–1809): Symphony in G major - "Oxford" (Nr. 92), arranged for 9-part harmonie.
  1. Adagio / Allegro spirituoso
  2. Adagio
  3. Menuetto, Allegretto
  4. Presto
- Wolfgang Amadeus Mozart (1756–1791): Don Giovanni, Overture and arias for harmonie (2 ob, 2 cl, 2 hn, 2 bsn, cbsn (ad lib.))
  1. Ouvertura
  2. Introduzione. Notte e giorno faticar
  3. Madamina, il catalogo è questo
  4. Giovinette che fate all' amore
  5. Dalla sua pace
  6. Fin ch'han dal vino
  7. Batti, Batti, o bel Masetto
  8. Presto presto pria ch'ei venga
- Wolfgang Amadeus Mozart (1756–1791): La clemenza di Tito, Overture and aria for harmonie
  1. Overture
  2. Deh prendi un dolce amplesso
  3. Marcia
  4. Del piu sublime soglio
- Wolfgang Amadeus Mozart (1756–1791): Cosi fan tutte, for harmonie
- Luigi Cherubini (1760–1842): - overture and arias from the opera Medea for wind octet
- Franz Schubert (1797–1828): music for the romantic play "Rosamunde, Princess of Cyprus" Helmina von Chezy D 797, arranged for harmonie.
- 1805 Treurmars, for wind octet
- Concertino, for fortepiano, wind octet (2 ob, 2 cl, 2 hn, 2 bsn) and contrabassoon
  1. Adagio - Allegro Molto
  2. Menuetto
  3. Andante con vars
  4. Menuetto
  5. Rondo
- Partita in B♭ major, for wind octet and trumpet
  1. Adagio - Allegro Moderato
  2. Andante
  3. Menuetto
  4. Allegro con moto
- Partita in E♭ major, for wind octet
  1. Allegro Vivace
  2. Andante
  3. Menuetto
  4. Rondo
- Partita in D minor, for wind octet
- Suite in B♭ major
- Suite in E♭ major
- Partitta in Dis (E♭ major) (Musica Aeterna Verlag)
- Variations on an Original March
- Menuetto Con Variazioni in F on a theme from Mozart's Don Giovanni, for wind octet

=== Instrumental music ===
- Konzert für die Oboe (Allgemeines Intelligenzblatt der Stadt Nürnberg p. 818)
- Double Concerto for violin and oboe (AMZ 1824, No. 26)

=== Vocal music ===
- Die Höhle auf dem Lorenzberge zu Prag im Herbste 1792 : Lied for voice and piano (A-Wien Mus.Hs.33215 Mus)
- Gebet der Armen für Ihre Wohltäter, for 5 soloists and choir (AMZ 1824, No. 26)
- Cantata Acis und Galathea for choir and winds (AMZ 1824, No. 8)

=== Stage works ===
==== Operas ====
| Year | Title | acts | première | libretto |
|---|---|---|---|---|
| 1798 | Die Liebe macht kurzen Prozess (or: Heirat auf gewisse Art); (with Matthäus Stegmayer, Joseph Wölfl, Franz Anton Hoffmeister, Joh. B. Henneberg, Franz Xaver Süßmayr and Jakob Haibel) | 2 | March 26, 1798, Vienna, Theater auf der Wieden | Joachim Perinet |
| 1798 | Jägerfreude. Eine kleine Kantate in zwey Abtheilungen. Widmung: Fürst Alois von Liechtenstein Wien 1798 | 2 | | Matthäus Stegmayer (Schauspieler) |
| 1799 | Der rote Geist im Donnergebirge (2 cd act composed by Ignaz Ritter von Seyfried) | 2 | June 5, 1799, Vienna, Theater auf der Wieden | Matthäus Stegmayer |
| 1820 | Divoká honba - Die wilde Jagd | | March 8, 1820, Prague, State Opera (Stavovské divadlo) | Sebastian Willibald Schiessler |
| 1820–1821 | Manželé podle módy - Die Ehemänner nach der Mode | 3 | January 31, 1821, Prague, State Opera (Stavovské divadlo) | J. von Seyfried |
| 1823 | Telemach na ostrově Ogygisa - Telemach auf der Insel Ogygia | 2 | January 10, 1824, Prague, State Theatre (Stavovské divadlo) | K.J. Schikaneder |
