= Divertimenti for ten winds (Mozart) =

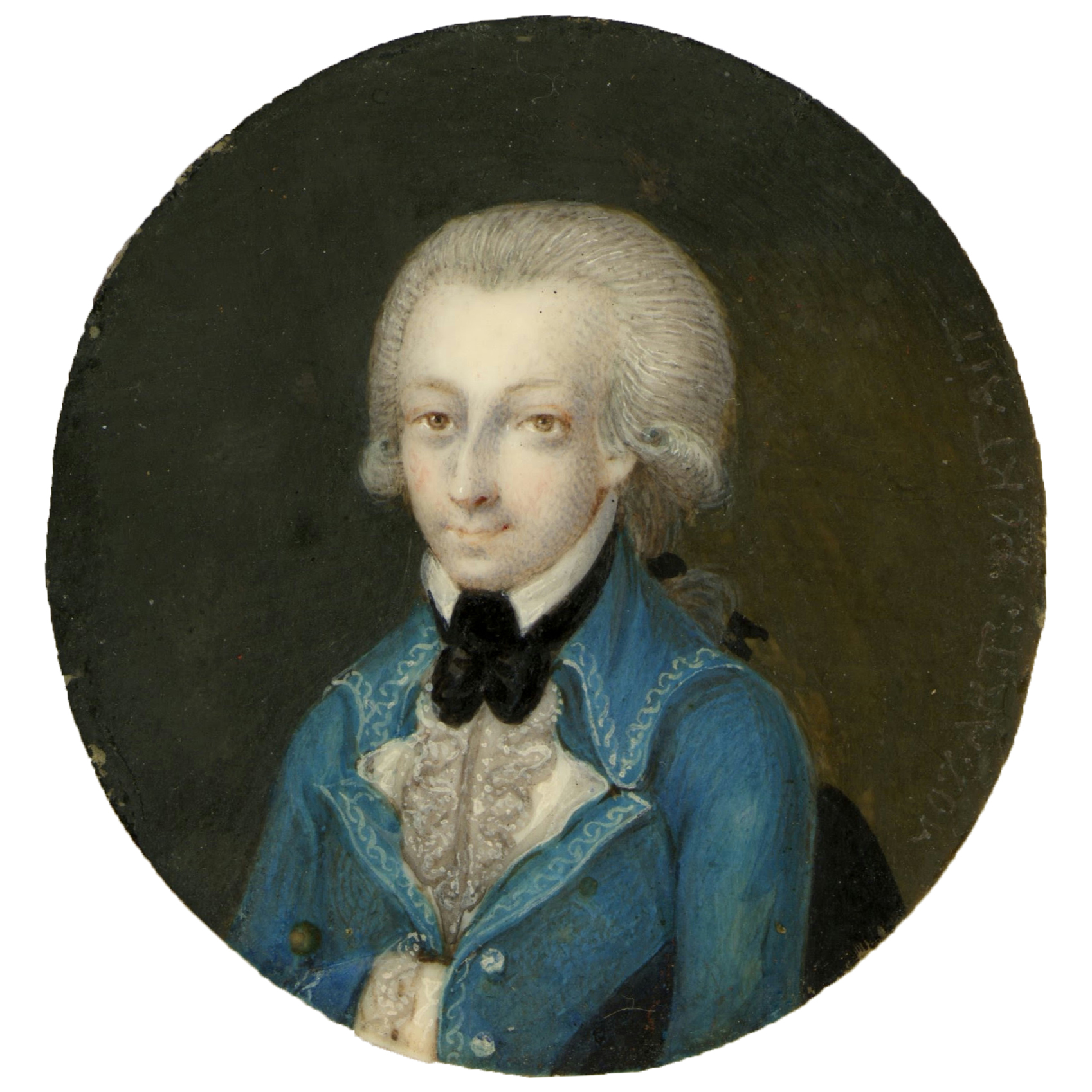
1773 miniature of Mozart

The divertimenti in B♭ major, K 186/159b, and E♭ major, K 166/159d, are two companion compositions for pairs of oboes, English horns, clarinets, horns and bassoons by Wolfgang Amadeus Mozart.

== Background ==
It is not known whether these were commissioned works nor, if so, who commissioned them: both Wyzewa & St. Foix and Einstein assume an anonymous Milanese patron (possibly an amateur musician) to be involved. They based this conclusion on the notion that no clarinets were available in Salzburg at that time and that Mozart must have brought back the pieces from his third and last Italian journey during the winter of 1772-73. This notion, which was first asserted by Otto Jahn and then rather carelessly propagated by many scholars, has been put in considerable doubt by Kurt Birsak's research, which revealed that clarinets were mentioned in an Aufsatz und Specification deren Spielleithen nothbetärftigen Instrumenten in französischem Thon [Essay and Specifications of the Instruments in the French Pitch required by Military Bandsmen] from 1769. However, Colin Lawson asserts that the writing for clarinet in K 166/159d (and to a lesser extent in K 186/159b) is incompatible with what would be expected from clarinettists in a mere military wind band, thereby adding credence to the theory that the works were inspired by an ensemble outside Salzburg. Indeed, in K 186/159b, the first of the two works, the clarinets are treated very often in the same way as the horns, providing pedal points and filling out the harmony without being given the opportunity for solo work, while the majority of the musical and lyrical statements are made by the oboes and English horns; in K 166/159d, on the other hand, the clarinets have become far more independent and are often given the upper voices, sometimes acting as a true pair of soloists accompanied only by the bass.

The Neue Mozart Ausgabe (NMA) suggests that the works might have been commissioned by Grand Duke Leopold I of Tuscany, with whom Mozart unsuccessfully applied for employment. It has also been pointed out that the unusual scoring, most importantly the use of two English horns (Mozart had used them before only in the second version of the Divertimento K 113, also composed in Milan, and in La finta semplice, and after only in Il rè pastore), strongly suggests a commission conceived for an already existing ensemble outside Salzburg. Unfortunately, the fact that the autograph of K 166/159d explicitly mentions Salzburg does not make unravelling the genesis of these works easier.

That the two pieces are companions is clear not only from the instrumentation but also from their structure: after the opening Allegro follow a Menuetto, a central Andante, an Adagio (thereby deviating from the more common sequence of two Menuetti encompassing the Andante) and a final Allegro structured as a Rondo. Although formally for ten winds, both divertimenti display a quite economical use of the ten instruments, considering that there are usually not more than two to three genuinely independent parts: oboes are often paired in thirds and combined with English horns likewise paired but playing an octave lower. Clarinets are often combined with oboes in sixths and the two bassoons always play in unison. The horns are confined to providing pedal notes or completing the chords, but in K 166/159d they do get a couple of opportunities to shine as a pair of soloists in typical horn calls. Further evidence for the kinship comes from the fact that in both pieces Mozart quotes from the ballet sketches Le gelosie del Seraglio K 135a (see below), now confirmed to have been composed by Joseph Starzer.

These two divertimenti clearly comprise the first stage in Mozart's development as a composer of wind music, the second consisting of the five divertimenti for six winds (K 213, 240, 252/240a, 253 and 270), and the third of the large-scale serenades, K 361/370a, 375, and 388/384a, written in Vienna. K 186/159b and 166/159d display a considerably lighter, more recreational and perhaps even more casual spirit than the later works, true to the interpretation of the term divertimento.

== Divertimento in B♭ major, K 186/159b ==
The autograph is preserved in the State Library Berlin – Prussian Cultural Heritage (Music Department) and is undated. The work consists of the following five movements:

1. Allegro assai
2. Menuetto with Trio
3. Andante
4. Adagio
5. Allegro

The rather straightforward opening Allegro assai is a Ländler that functions as an Intrada to the rest of the work. Originally, Mozart had a different Trio in mind, one written for two oboes and bassoon, but this was crossed out and replaced with another featuring a dialogue between the oboes and the English horns, supported by the bass; the original is available in the NMA. The theme of the final Allegro is identical to no. 31 in K 135a (see above). Although the explicit indication is missing from the autograph the horns in K 186/159b are corni alti in B [high horns in B♭].

== Divertimento in E♭ major, K 166/159d ==
The autograph is preserved in the Biblioteka Jagiellońska Kraków and is dated 24 March 1773. The work consists of the following five movements:

1. Allegro
2. Menuetto with Trio and Coda
3. Andante grazioso
4. Adagio
5. Allegro

The opening Allegro features an exposition which is immediately followed by a recapitulation in varied harmony. The Trio is a true trio in that it is scored for the two English horns with bass only. The main theme of the Andante grazioso, an almost literal transcription of an operatic sinfonia by Giovanni Paisiello, is performed by the first oboe and first English horn an octave lower, supported by the bass. The Adagio is thematically linked to No. 30 in K 135a (see above) and generates a peculiar atmosphere with its long notes, legato line and great clarity. The final Allegro is a boisterous contredanse.

== Notable recordings ==
- Ensemble Zefiro: Paolo Grazzi on a 2-key period oboe by Bernardini & Ceccolini (1994) after Grundmann & Floth (Dresden, ca. 1790), Andrea Mion on a period oboe by M. Ponseele (1993) after H. Grenser, Alfredo Bernardini on a period English horn by Bernardini & Everts (1988) after Floth, Alessandro Piqué on a period English horn by O. Cortet (1986) after Floth, Lorenzo Coppola on a period clarinet by D. Bangham (1991) after H. Grenser (Dresden, ca. 1800), Daniele Latini on a period clarinet by D. Bangham (1992) after H. Grenser (Dresden, ca. 1800), Raul Diaz on a natural horn by Paxman (1985) after Raoux (Paris, ca. 1800), Dileno Baldin on a natural horn by A. Jungwirth (1992) after Courtois (Paris, ca. 1800), Alberto Grazzi on a period bassoon by H. Grenser (ca. 1790) and Josep Borras on a period bassoon by Rust (Lyon, ca. 1790); Auvidis Astree E 8573 (1996, K 186/159b) and E 8605 (1997, K 166/159d).
