= Bruck an der Leitha =

- Municipality
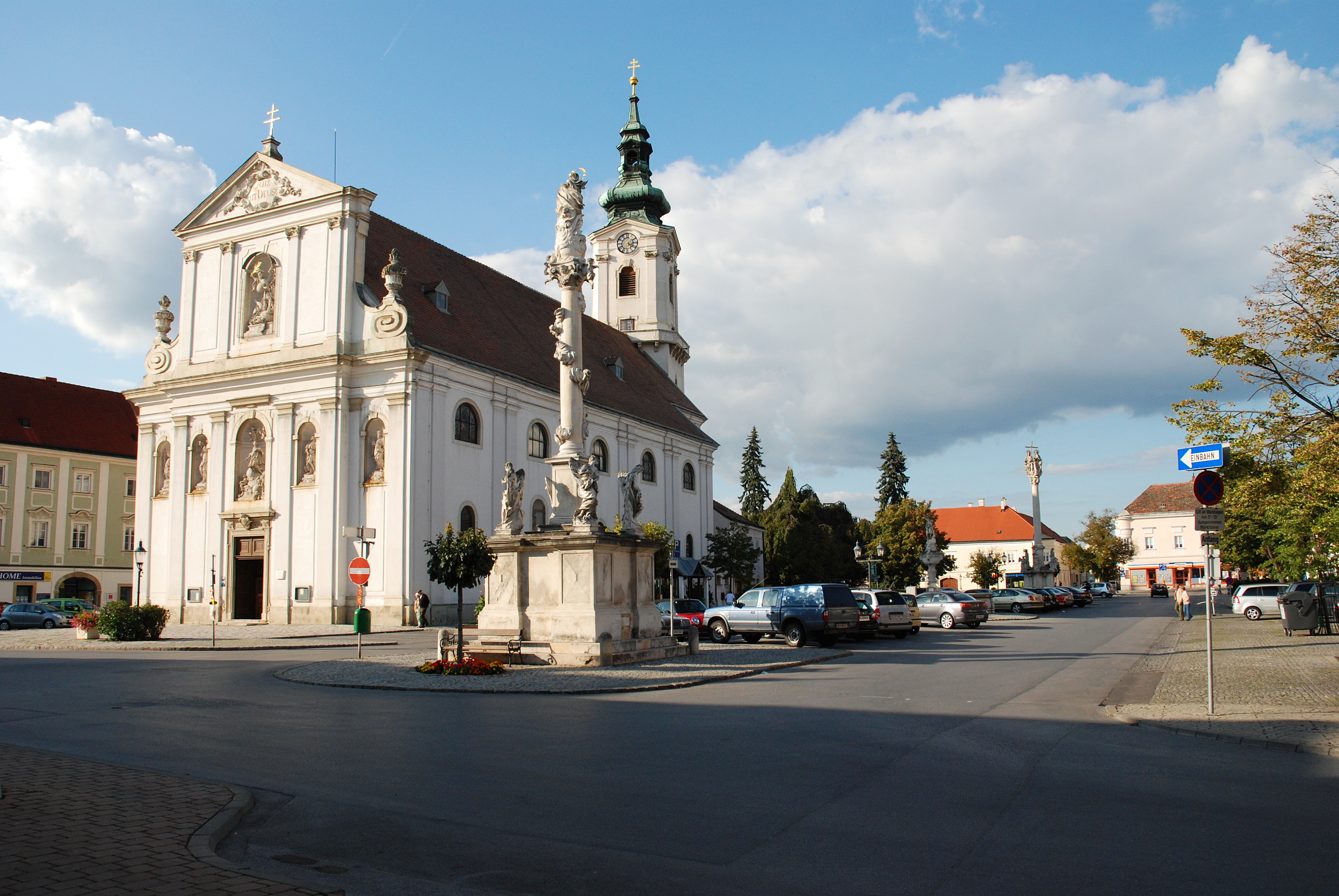
- Main square with the parish church

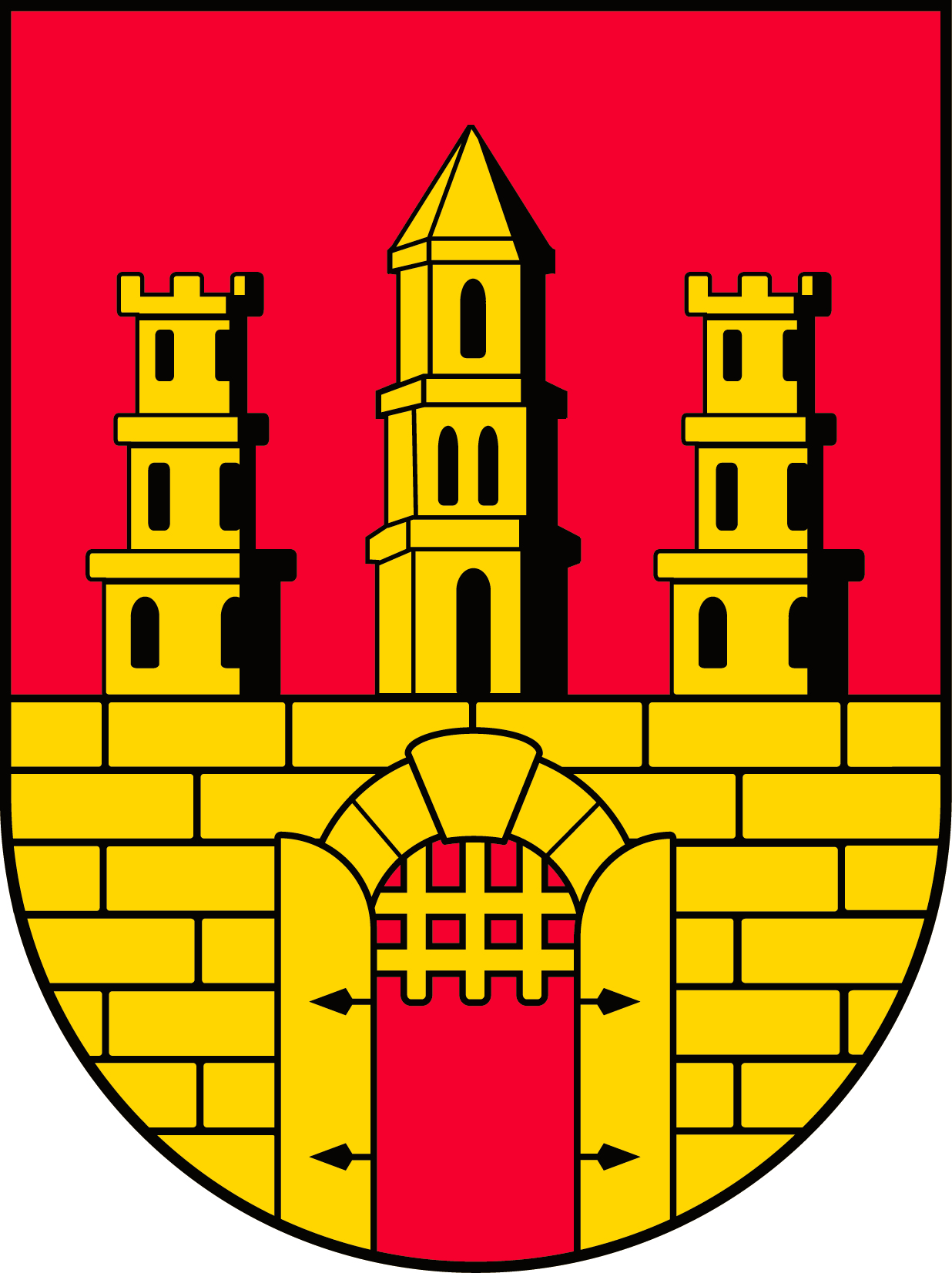
- Coat of arms

- Location within Austria
- Coordinates: 48°1′N 16°46′E
- Country: Austria
- State: Lower Austria
- District: Bruck an der Leitha

Government
  - Mayor: Gerhard Weil (SPÖ)

Area
  - Total: 23.69 km^{2} (9.15 sq mi)
- Elevation: 156 m (512 ft)

Population (2016-01-01)
  - Total: 7,887
  - Density: 332.9/km^{2} (862.3/sq mi)
- Time zone: UTC+1 (CET)
  - Summer (DST): UTC+2 (CEST)
- Postal code: 2460
- Area code: +43 02 162
- Website: www.bruckleitha.at

Bruck an der Leitha (Central Bavarian: Bruck aun da Leitha; 'Bridge on the Leitha') is a town in the Austrian state of Lower Austria on the border of Burgenland, marked by the Leitha river. In 2018 it had a population of around 8,000.

== History ==
In and around Bruck parts of Neolithic tools were found, which makes it likely that there was a settlement there at that time. In Roman time, there was the crossing of two major roads, one of them being the Amber Road, the other a link to the Via Militaris. The important Roman army camp Carnuntum was located only ten miles northeast of Bruck at the Amber Road. In Bruck a Roman fortification is said to have been at the place of "Schloss Prugg" (castle of Duke Harrach), of which one part still is named Roman Tower (though being built in the Middle Ages).

After the end of the Roman Empire, the first traces of new settlement date from around 900. Graves from this time show Hungarian and later Francian/Bavarian influence. In 1074 the settlement is first documented as "Aschirichesprucca" and elevated to the status of a city in 1239. During the 13th century Bruck was rebuilt according to a rectangular street-scheme north-east of the old settlement.

Though quite strongly fortified since, Bruck never played an important role in a military conflict. In the long period of wars with the Turkish Empire the fortifications were already outdated, so Bruck did not even try to resist Turkish troops when they approached Vienna in 1529 and 1683 (Siege of Vienna). Therefore, Bruck was not destroyed (unlike other towns like Hainburg).

After this period, Bruck prospered and became an important center of wine production and trade. In the Napoleonic Wars Bruck was a center of maneuvers for the Austrian army, which it remained during the 19th century. In 1867 an important permanent military base was erected. After the end of World War I in 1918 the Austro-Hungarian Empire broke up. Most of Bruck belonged to Austria, but the military base and the main railway station was situated on the Hungarian side of the border (this part of Bruck is called Bruckneudorf).

This border, symbolised by the river Leitha, separated the Austrian Empire from the Kingdom of Hungary (Cisleithania and Transleithania).

In 1921, when the western parts of Hungary were integrated to Austrian territory under the name of "Burgenland", Bruck remained divided between the provinces of Lower Austria and Burgenland. Bruck an der Leitha became the capital of the same-named district. Despite the important military base neighbouring Bruck, the town was not much affected by World War II. Today, Bruck has about 7300 inhabitants and still is the administrative center of the district. Important sights are the city walls from the 13th century, the Baroque church and the old castle, Schloss Prugg, of the Dukes of Harrach.

Today, the town is prospering in the energy department. It has nearby a large wind farm (possibly 60MW), which generates all the electricity for the town. In fact, the wind farm produces more energy than the town consumes, so the town profits off it through energy sales.

== Subdivisions ==
- Bruck an der Leitha: 14,78 km^{2}
- Schloss Prugg (de): 0,71 km^{2}
- Wilfleinsdorf (de): 8,32 km^{2}

== Notable people ==
- Otto Tschadek (de)
- Oskar Helmer (de)
- Johann-Nepomuk Kral
- Leopold Petznek (de)
- Josef Ernst Köpplinger (de)
- Alfred Anton Ruscher, Österreichischer Eisenbahnpionier der k.k. Staatsbahnen (de)
- Anton Stadler, clarinettist (de)
- Johann Stadler, clarinettist
- Johannes Huber, doctor, theologian (de)
- Karl Oppitzhauser, racing driver

== Twin towns – sister cities ==
Bruck an der Leitha is twinned with Bruckmühl, Germany, since 1974.

== See also ==
- Bruck·neudorf (there is the Bruck an der Leitha station), now Neusiedl am See District, Burgenland
- Transleithania
