= Bruckneudorf =

- Municipality
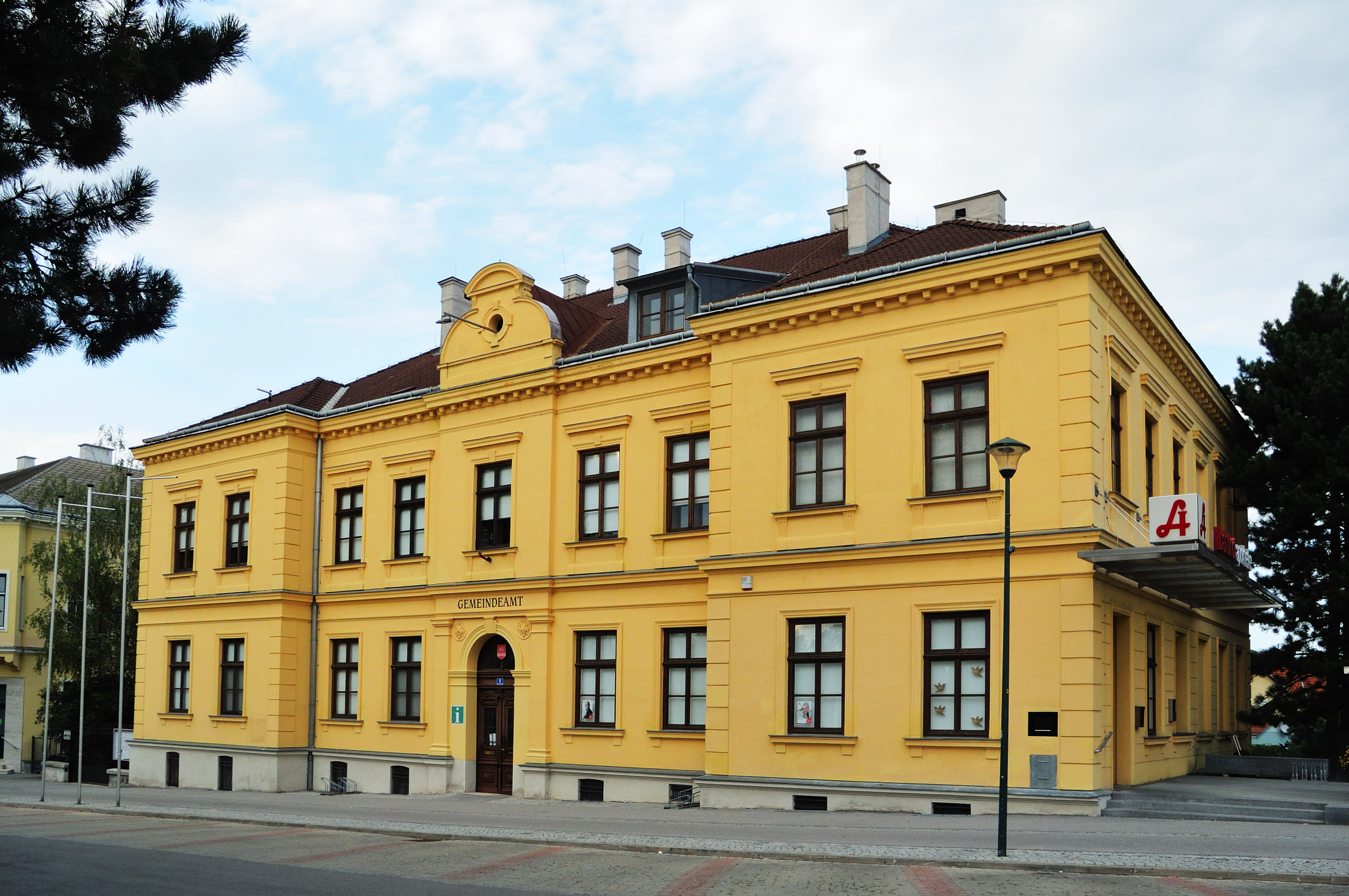
- Municipal office

- Coat of arms

- Location within Austria
- Coordinates: 48°1′N 16°46′E
- Country: Austria
- State: Burgenland
- District: Neusiedl am See

Government
  - Mayor: Gerhard Dreiszker (SPÖ)

Area
  - Total: 36.67 km^{2} (14.16 sq mi)
- Elevation: 150 m (490 ft)

Population (2018-01-01)
  - Total: 3,026
  - Density: 82.52/km^{2} (213.7/sq mi)
- Time zone: UTC+1 (CET)
  - Summer (DST): UTC+2 (CEST)
- Postal code: 2460
- Area code: 02162
- Website: bruckneudorf.eu

Bruckneudorf (Hungarian: Királyhida) is a small town in the district of Neusiedl am See in the federal state of Burgenland in Austria, neighbouring Bruck an der Leitha ("Leitha Bridge"). Its name means bridge new village, whereas the Hungarian version means royal bridge, and the royal refers to King Francis I. Historically and geographically, Bruckneudorf represents the extension of the Austrian town of Bruck an der Leitha over the Austrian border into Hungary. This border, symbolised by the river Leitha, separated the Austrian Empire from the Kingdom of Hungary (Cisleithania and Transleithania). Its main current national significance derives from the Bruckneudorf military exercise ground of the Austrian federal army. Currently it is also the site of Bruck an der Leitha railway station, an important railway station near the borders with Hungary and Slovakia, a stop for nearly all the international trains that pass through it.

== History ==
Together with the rest of Burgenland, the municipality was in Hungary (under the name of German West Hungary) until 1920/21. From 1898, although a largely German speaking area, it was required to take the Hungarian name of Királyhida as part of the Hungarian language policy of the national government in Budapest. After World War I, under the treaties of St. Germain and Trianon, German West Hungary was transferred to Austria (see History of Burgenland). In Roman times the area was already densely populated, and Villa Bruckneudorf, one of the most important Roman villas to be discovered in Eastern Austria, is a few kilometres to the east.

The Imperial Park (Kaiserpark) has the only memorial of the Emperor Francis Joseph I in modern Austrian territory which describes him by his other title of King of Hungary.

A chapter in The Good Soldier Švejk, which deals with the relationship between the Hungarian community and other nationalities in Austria-Hungary, is set in this town. In the 1960s, during the height of the Cold War, the Ungerberg Bunker Complex was constructed to defend the route to Vienna against a possible Soviet attack. The bunker now operates as part of the Army History Museum/Military Historical Institute, as a branch museum.

== Climate ==
Climate data for Bruckneudorf (1981–2010)
Month	Jan	Feb	Mar	Apr	May	Jun	Jul	Aug	Sep	Oct	Nov	Dec	Year
Record high °C (°F)	19.2 (66.6)	19.2 (66.6)	25.4 (77.7)	27.2 (81.0)	33.0 (91.4)	36.4 (97.5)	39.0 (102.2)	37.8 (100.0)	32.4 (90.3)	28.0 (82.4)	21.2 (70.2)	17.9 (64.2)	39.0 (102.2)
Mean daily maximum °C (°F)	2.1 (35.8)	4.5 (40.1)	9.8 (49.6)	16.0 (60.8)	21.2 (70.2)	24.2 (75.6)	27.1 (80.8)	26.6 (79.9)	21.2 (70.2)	14.8 (58.6)	7.6 (45.7)	2.8 (37.0)	14.8 (58.6)
Daily mean °C (°F)	−0.5 (31.1)	1.0 (33.8)	5.1 (41.2)	10.4 (50.7)	15.4 (59.7)	18.4 (65.1)	20.8 (69.4)	20.4 (68.7)	15.7 (60.3)	10.3 (50.5)	4.8 (40.6)	0.5 (32.9)	10.2 (50.4)
Mean daily minimum °C (°F)	−2.6 (27.3)	−1.6 (29.1)	2.0 (35.6)	6.1 (43.0)	10.7 (51.3)	13.6 (56.5)	15.8 (60.4)	15.7 (60.3)	11.9 (53.4)	7.2 (45.0)	2.5 (36.5)	−1.4 (29.5)	6.7 (44.1)
Record low °C (°F)	−21.6 (−6.9)	−19.6 (−3.3)	−16.5 (2.3)	−3.0 (26.6)	0.8 (33.4)	4.8 (40.6)	6.0 (42.8)	6.6 (43.9)	3.0 (37.4)	−5.8 (21.6)	−11.0 (12.2)	−19.1 (−2.4)	−21.6 (−6.9)
Average precipitation mm (inches)	28 (1.1)	27 (1.1)	38 (1.5)	35 (1.4)	60 (2.4)	70 (2.8)	63 (2.5)	64 (2.5)	57 (2.2)	39 (1.5)	45 (1.8)	40 (1.6)	566 (22.3)
Average snowfall cm (inches)	14 (5.5)	14 (5.5)	7 (2.8)	1 (0.4)	0 (0)	0 (0)	0 (0)	0 (0)	0 (0)	0 (0)	7 (2.8)	13 (5.1)	57 (22)
Average relative humidity (%) (at 14:00)	75.5	65.7	55.9	47.5	49.4	49.9	45.2	45.7	53.4	61.1	73.9	79.5	58.6
Source: Central Institute for Meteorology and Geodynamics

Climate data for Bruckneudorf (1971–2000)
Month	Jan	Feb	Mar	Apr	May	Jun	Jul	Aug	Sep	Oct	Nov	Dec	Year
Record high °C (°F)	16.0 (60.8)	19.0 (66.2)	25.4 (77.7)	27.2 (81.0)	31.2 (88.2)	37.0 (98.6)	36.8 (98.2)	38.0 (100.4)	32.4 (90.3)	26.0 (78.8)	20.0 (68.0)	17.9 (64.2)	38.0 (100.4)
Mean daily maximum °C (°F)	2.0 (35.6)	4.4 (39.9)	9.9 (49.8)	15.2 (59.4)	20.8 (69.4)	23.7 (74.7)	26.3 (79.3)	26.2 (79.2)	21.1 (70.0)	14.8 (58.6)	7.1 (44.8)	3.3 (37.9)	14.6 (58.3)
Daily mean °C (°F)	−0.8 (30.6)	0.8 (33.4)	5.0 (41.0)	9.6 (49.3)	14.8 (58.6)	17.8 (64.0)	20.0 (68.0)	19.8 (67.6)	15.3 (59.5)	9.8 (49.6)	3.9 (39.0)	0.7 (33.3)	9.7 (49.5)
Mean daily minimum °C (°F)	−2.9 (26.8)	−1.7 (28.9)	1.7 (35.1)	5.4 (41.7)	9.9 (49.8)	12.8 (55.0)	14.7 (58.5)	13.8 (56.8)	11.3 (52.3)	6.6 (43.9)	1.7 (35.1)	−1.2 (29.8)	6.1 (43.0)
Record low °C (°F)	−21.6 (−6.9)	−19.6 (−3.3)	−16.5 (2.3)	−3.0 (26.6)	−1.0 (30.2)	3.0 (37.4)	6.0 (42.8)	4.4 (39.9)	2.0 (35.6)	−6.0 (21.2)	−11.0 (12.2)	−19.1 (−2.4)	−21.6 (−6.9)
Average precipitation mm (inches)	30.8 (1.21)	27.4 (1.08)	34.8 (1.37)	39.2 (1.54)	56.6 (2.23)	67.5 (2.66)	63.7 (2.51)	55.4 (2.18)	51.6 (2.03)	36.7 (1.44)	47.7 (1.88)	38.4 (1.51)	549.8 (21.65)
Average snowfall cm (inches)	13.6 (5.4)	12.1 (4.8)	6.9 (2.7)	0.9 (0.4)	0.0 (0.0)	0.0 (0.0)	0.0 (0.0)	0.0 (0.0)	0.0 (0.0)	0.0 (0.0)	8.6 (3.4)	15.2 (6.0)	57.3 (22.6)
Average precipitation days (≥ 1.0 mm)	6.3	6.3	6.8	6.6	7.5	9.0	7.9	7.1	6.1	5.7	8.1	7.4	84.8
Average relative humidity (%) (at 14:00)	76.9	67.6	56.1	49.0	48.8	50.8	45.5	45.4	52.7	58.7	73.9	78.5	58.7
Source: Central Institute for Meteorology and Geodynamics

== Population ==
Historical population
Year	Pop.	±%
1869	792	—
1880	764	−3.5%
1890	912	+19.4%
1900	1,283	+40.7%
1910	1,571	+22.4%
1923	1,548	−1.5%
1934	2,174	+40.4%
1939	1,932	−11.1%
1951	1,746	−9.6%
1961	1,830	+4.8%
1971	1,694	−7.4%
1981	1,853	+9.4%
1991	1,947	+5.1%
2001	2,609	+34.0%
2011	2,755	+5.6%

== Economy and infrastructure ==
The Bruckneudorf Military Training Area run by the Bundesheer is nationally important.

=== Transport ===
Rail: Bruck an der Leitha railway station is an important transport hub on the Austrian Eastern Railway and of great importance for Bruckneudorf.
