= Nauders roadblock =

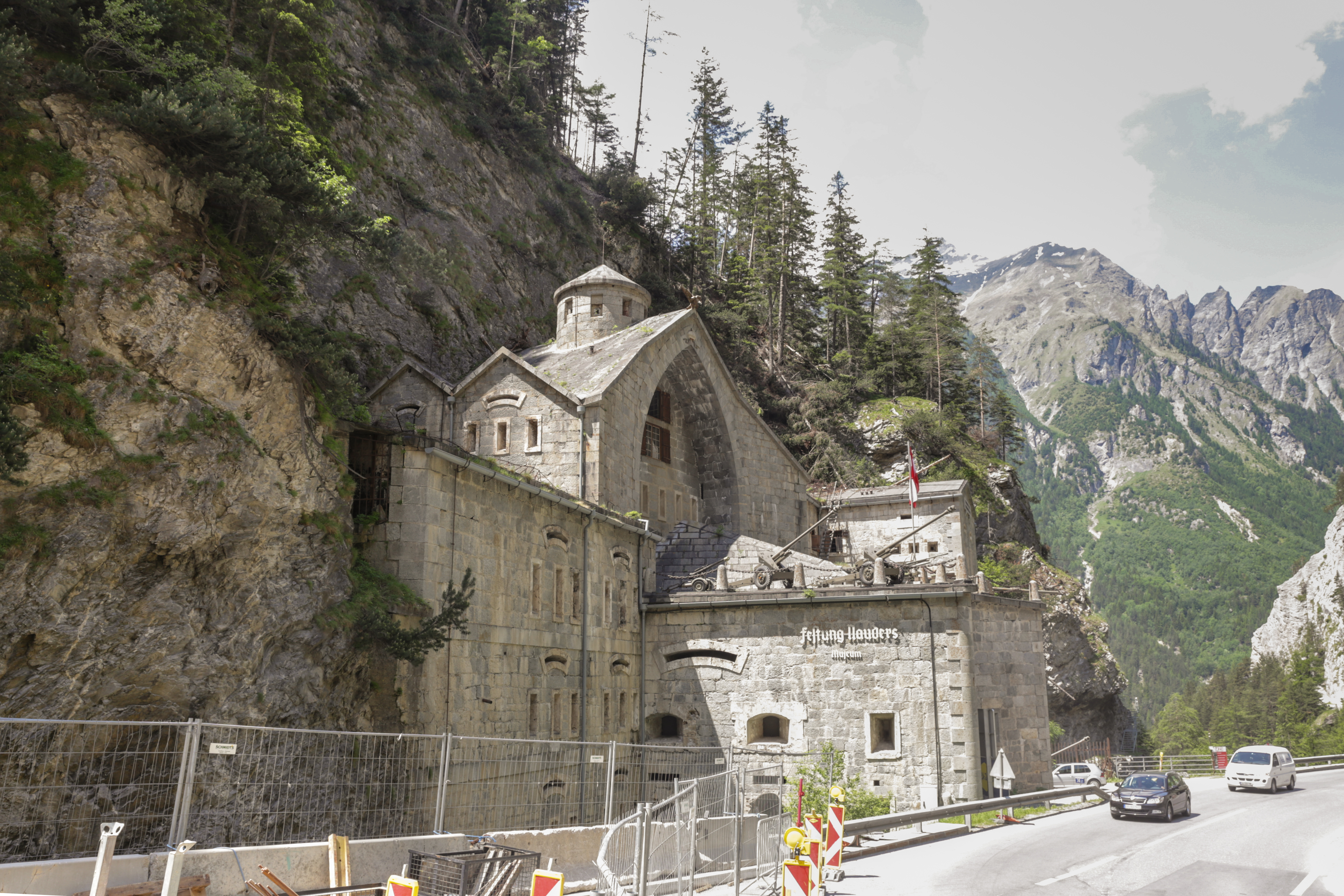
Fort Nauders as of 2015.

Fort Nauders is a 19th century Austro-Hungarian roadblock built 4 km (2.5 mi) northwest of the Tyrolean town of Nauders. The fort was built between 1834 and 1840 to guard the Reschen and Finstermünz passes, in addition to the Upper Inn Valley and Vorarlberg. Fort Nauders was built on top of a medieval defensive wall, called the “Nikalas” wall. It was designed by Austrian architect Franz von Scholl and built under 2 Austro-Hungarian emperors, Franz I, and Ferdinand I. The fort is the lesser known of the early alpine barrages and sometimes is called Fort Finstermünz, named after the pass of the same name.

The fort is part of the first Austro-Hungarian fortifications built to protect Tyrol from Lombardy and the Engadin. The five-story structure is built mainly of stone, and the fort became obsolete with the advent of heavier artillery and rifled weapons. The fort was augmented by 8 M94 8 cm (3.14 in) casemate cannons, and has rifle and cannon embrasures covering the road. The fort has 70 rooms and has barracks built up to 20 m (66 ft) into the rock. Fort Nauders, in addition to being built into the rock, has a stream running in front of it, making assaulting the fort challenging, and only opening the fort to damage on the exterior. The steep rock walls that the fort is built into narrow attack from either the north or south. The positioning of the fort hid it from view to anyone coming up from the south, thus achieving surprise on any advancing troops. Additionally, the positioning of the artillery in the fort and the lanes of attack would make assault on the fort costly and the natural rock protection prevented the fort from being struck by artillery.

== World War I ==
Fort Nauders was, for the last time, after serving in wars in 1848, 1859, 1866, activated and armed at the outbreak of hostilities in May 1915. Fort Nauders had seen and served in every war of Italian independence. Despite being activated, the war never reached Nauders.

== Post-war ==
Fort Nauders has been well preserved, because it has never seen combat. Today, the fort is a museum and houses the Panzermuseum across the road.
