= Johann Stadler =

Johann Nepomuk Stadler (6 May 1755, Bruck an der Leitha – 2 May 1804, Vienna) was an Austrian clarinet and basset horn player and younger brother of the clarinet player Anton Stadler.

Like his more famous brother Anton, Johann Nepomuk Stadler started out as an employee of the Russian ambassador in Vienna, Dmitry Mikhaylovich Galitzine (1721–1793). In February 1782 Emperor Joseph II, who did not want the Stadler brothers to leave Vienna, issued a special decree to have them hired as members of the Vienna Court Orchestra, where Johann Nepumuk Stadler played first clarinet to his brother's second. Along with his brother, he made an acquaintance with Mozart. In 1801 Ludwig van Beethoven wrote the basset horn part in his ballet The Creatures of Prometheus op. 43 especially for Johann Stadler.
