= Csakan =

Woodwind instrument

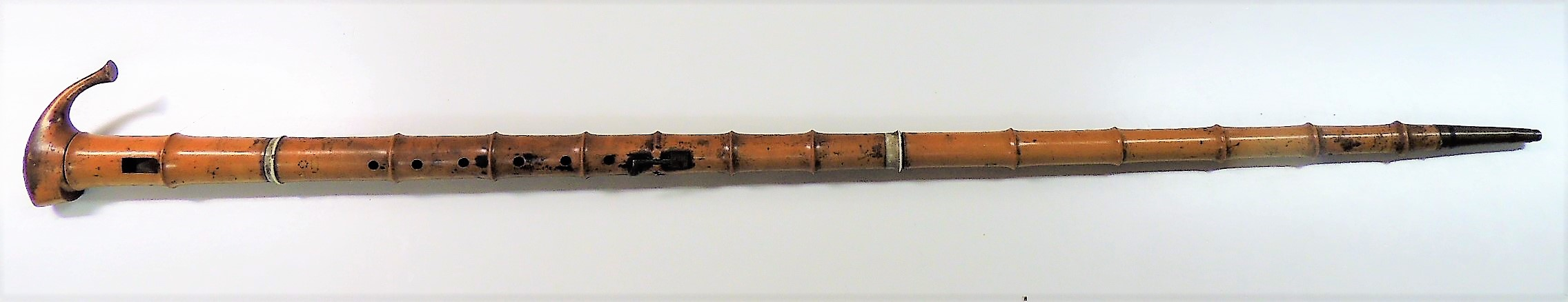
- A csakan in the Österreichisches Blasmusikmuseum in Oberwölz, Styria, Austria.

Woodwind
- Other names: Czakan, Csákány, Tsákány, Flûte douce
- Classification: Wind; Woodwind; Aerophone
- Hornbostel–Sachs classification: 421.221.12 (Flute with internal duct and finger holes)
- Inventor: Anton Heberle?
- Developed: c.1806 from the recorder and Eastern European folk flutes

Playing range
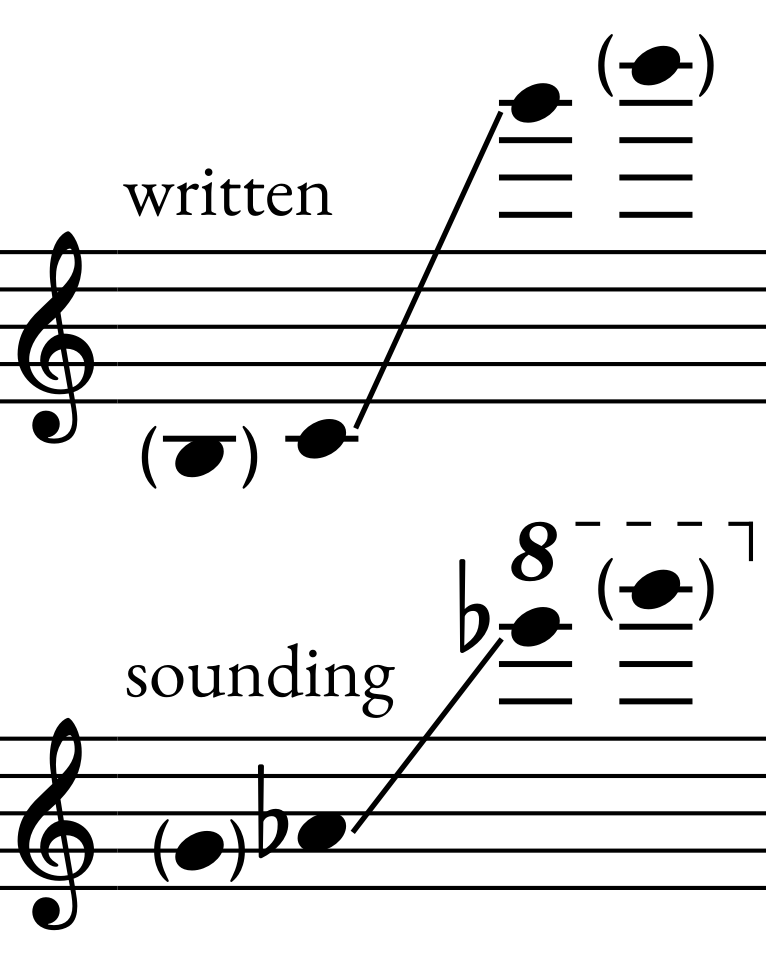
- Written and sounding ranges of the csakan Notated: (B_{3})C_{4}–G_{6}(B_{6}) Sounding: (G_{4})A-flat_{4}–E-flat_{7}(G_{7})

Related instruments
- Recorder; Flageolet

The csakan is a type of woodwind instrument that was popular in Austria-Hungary in the 19th century.

A type of duct flute, the csakan was originally a recorder crafted in the shape of a walking stick with a mouthpiece in the handle, reflecting the design of Hungarian war hammers which had been converted into flutes. From the 1820s, a new design appeared, which was in the shape of an oboe or clarinet.

The csakan is a transposing instrument in A-flat although it could also be considered a transposing instrument in A when used with guitars which were almost always tuned a semitone down when accompanying the csakan. Modern manufacturers refer to it as "the Romantic recorder".

Octaving is achieved on the csakan in the same manner as the recorder, that is by partially opening the thumb hole to allow it to act as a register vent. However, csakans were sometimes equipped with a removable bushing for the thumbhole which would create the correct opening size with the thumb removed from the hole. This necessitates the use of overblown fingerings for C♯_{5} and D_{5} which would otherwise be produced from the thumb hole.

== History ==
In the early 19th century, walking sticks with purposes other than walking aids were fashionable throughout the dual monarchy. This included various items such as telescopes, candlesticks and swords as well as musical instruments. While the walking stick versions of other instruments could simply play the existing repertoire, the walking stick recorder found itself with its own repertoire as the regular recorder was no longer being composed for.

According to concert announcements from 1810, Anton Heberle was the inventor of the instrument. Heberle was also the first to perform on it publicly, in a concert in Pest on 18 February 1807. The earliest design of the csakan was either keyless or only equipped with a single key used for playing D♯ (as on the traverso) but by about 1820, an additional 6 keys (for G♯, F, F♯, B♭, low C♯, and a trill key for B-C) had been added. This 7-keyed csakan was referred to as a "complicirte csakan" (sophisticated csakan). Some later csakans had up to 13 keys and a range extending up an additional third with the addition of a special key.

Franz Schöllnast, a csakan maker from Bratislava, reported at the time that the csakan was most popular amongst amateur musicians who desired a cheap and easy to play instrument. There were a handful of professional players, most notably the oboist Ernst Krähmer who was described as being able to "diminish and swell the notes, up to an almost unbelievable loudness" suggesting that techniques had been developed to overcome the change of pitch that occurs when increasing or decreasing the breath pressure on fipple flutes.

During the course of the 19th century, it appears that some recorders by 18th century makers were converted for use as csakans as evidenced by surviving instruments by Denner and Staub with added keys and thumb hole bushings added to the aforementioned Denner as well as a recorder by Gahn.

The csakan continued to be played until around the turn of the 20th century as evidenced by methods by Krähmer (1870), Köhler (1880) and Barth (1910). Around this time, a new instrument referred to as the Vogtland Csakan, Schulcsakan, Schulflöte or Wiener Flageolet came into popularity as a school instrument. These were usually equipped with 6 keys and had 7 finger holes and a thumb hole but were pitched in C. They are more closely related to the English flageolet than to the csakan. These were quickly overtaken in popularity by the newly rediscovered and much cheaper soprano recorder.

== Repertoire ==
There are an estimated 400–500 surviving works for the csakan by many different composers. Heberle and Krähmer were the most prolific composers for the csakan with most other composers only publishing a small handful of works. Heberle was the first to publish music for the instrument, Scala für den Ungarischen Csakan. Much of the repertoire consists of arrangements of works for other instruments such as sonatas by Beethoven, waltzes by Johann Strauss II and various pieces extracted from popular operas of the time.

=== Selection of works ===
==== For unaccompanied csakan ====
- Anton Heberle's Sonate Brillante
- Anton Heberle's Fantasie
- Ernst Krähmer's 12 Original-Ländler, op. 17
- Ernst Krähmer's arrangements of Johann Strauss II Galoppe und Walzer

==== For csakan and piano or guitar ====
- Ernst Krähmer's Rondeau Hongrois, op. 28
- Joseph Gebauer's Sonate, op. 17
- August Eberhard Müller's arrangement of Carl Maria von Weber's Rondo, op. 39

==== For csakan and strings ====
- Anton Heberle's Andante con variazioni
- Karl Scholl's Quartetto
- Wilhelm Klingenbrunner's 12 Walzer, op. 47

==== For csakan and orchestra ====
- Anton Heberle's Concertino
- Ernst Krähmer's Concert Polonaise, op. 5

== Prominent csakan players ==
- Anton Heberle
- Ernst Krähmer (1795–1837)
- Hugo Reyne (born 1961)
- Nik Tarasov

== Makers of csakans ==
Csakan makers
Name	Location	Years active	Comments
Blessner, August	Budapest	1806–1854	
Carl, Georg Franz	Nuremberg	1825–1846	
Doke, Carl	Linz	1810–?	Also his son Alois
Fritsche, Carl August	Dresden	1803–1809	
Gohin, Henri	Paris	1978–	
Hammig, Friedrich	Vienna	1791–1823	
Hell, Ferdinand	Brno, Vienna	1830–1869	
Hofman, Elmar	Germany	?	First maker to copy csakans in the 20th century
Gebrüder Hoyer	Vienna	1831–1853	
Hulsens, Guido	Coulonges	1975–	Copies of Ziegler
Knechtl, Sebastian	Vienna	1842–1873	
Kobliczek, Peter	Germany	?	Recorders in A-flat for playing csakan repertoire
Koch, Stephan	Vienna	1807–1866	Also his son Stephan Jr.
Merklein, Johann Baptist	Vienna	1799–1852	
Mollenhauer, Bernhard	Fulda	1961–	Copies of Ziegler
Mollenhauer, Johann Andreas	Fulda	1822–1870	
Muss, Franz	Vienna	1864–1903	
Gebrüder Placht	Schönbach, Vienna, Budapest	1825–1925	
Schöllnast, Franz	Bratislava	1811–1882	Also his son Johann
Schweffer, Heinrich	Graz	c.1850–1900	
Uhlmann, Johann Tobias	Vienna	1810–1838	
Unglerth, Simon	Ljubljana	1798–1854	
Winckler, Johann Gottlieb	Leipzig	c.1790–1837	
Wenner, Martin	Singen	?-	Copies of Ziegler
Ziegler, Johann	Vienna	1821–1895	Also his son Johann Baptist
