= Serenade No. 11 (Mozart) =

Composition by Wolfgang Amadeus Mozart

- by W. A. Mozart
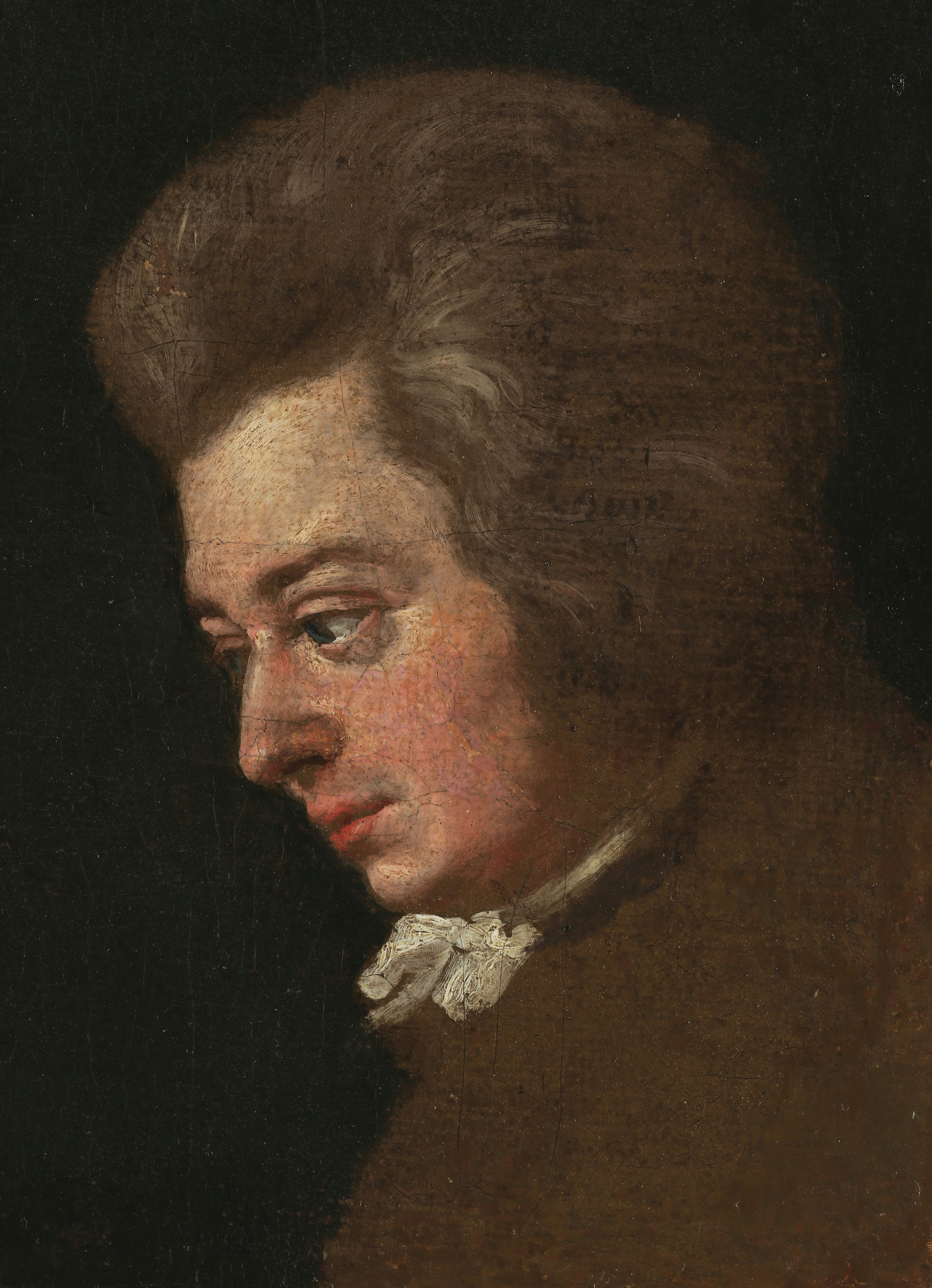
- Detail of Lange's 1782–83 Mozart portrait
- Key: E♭ major
- Catalogue: K. 375
- Occasion: St. Theresa's Day
- Composed: October 1781
- Performed: 15 October 1781
- Duration: ca. 25 minutes
- Movements: 5
- Scoring: two oboes (in revised version); two clarinets; two horns; two bassoons

The Serenade No. 11 for winds in E♭ major, K. 375, was written by Wolfgang Amadeus Mozart in October 1781 for St Theresa's day on 15 October.

Serenade K. 375 for eight instruments
I. Allegro maestoso

II. Menuetto

III. Adagio

IV. Menuetto

V. Allegro
Performed by the Soni Ventorum Wind Quintet with additional artists

The original version of the serenade is scored for six players: 2 clarinets, 2 horns, and 2 bassoons. Mozart later revised the score to add parts for two oboes.

It has five movements:

1. Allegro maestoso
2. Menuetto I
3. Adagio
4. Menuetto II
5. Finale: Allegro
