= Friedrich Arthur Uebel =

German woodwind instrument maker (1888–1963)

- Born: 6 August 1888; Gopplasgrün, Germany
- Died: 31 August 1963 (aged 75); Markneukirchen, Germany
- Occupation: Clarinet maker
- Years active: 1908–1963
- Notable work: Oehler system, under the trade mark FAU

Friedrich Arthur Uebel (6 August 1888 – 31 August 1963) was a German woodwind instrument maker. He was owner of the clarinet manufacturer, F. Arthur Uebel.

== Biography ==
Friedrich Arthur Uebel was the second son of the woodwind instrument maker, Friedrich Gustav Uebel. On 2 September 1936, he founded his own workshop in Markneukirchen, Saxony having previously learned clarinet making with his father and having completed in 1911 a traineeship with Oskar Oehler in Berlin with whom he worked closely until Oehler's death on 1 October 1936. He took over Oehler's customer base, continued to make clarinets using the Oehler system and registered the trademark FAU in the same year. Although the main focus was on building clarinets of the German system, the company also made Boehm and Reform Boehm clarinets.

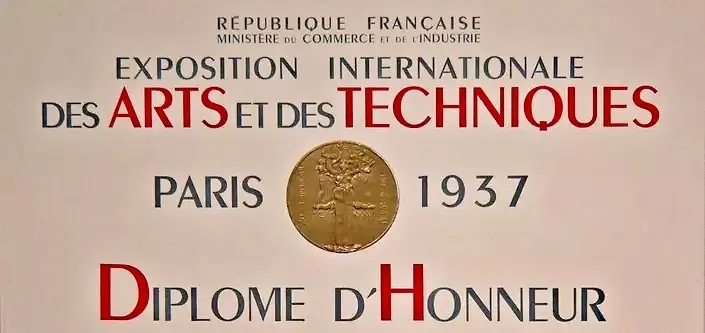

F. Arthur Uebel's manufacture was considered the most important German clarinet workshop in the second third of the 20th century and in the direct succession of Oskar Oehler, and was honoured with a "diplôme d'honneur" for a newly made bass clarinet and a clarinet at the 1937 Paris World Exhibition. The most important expert in the company was the tuner Max Schnabel (1893–1979). Numerous respected clarinettists played on clarinets by F. Arthur Uebel.

The cooperation with these and other artists resulted in some remarkable improvements of the mechanics of the Oehler clarinet, some of which became the standard for professional clarinets, and in a clarinet model that set the standard for decades and is still held in high esteem today, the theatre model 702, an original Oehler clarinet, additionally equipped with all the mechanical improvements developed by Uebel and with hand-forged and extra-strong silver-plated keys.

At its peak, Uebel employed 40 people, mostly men, and made about 400 clarinets a year. The most popular instruments were the student model 520 with 14 keys and four rings, but especially the more sophisticated model 620 with 19 keys and six rings without the above-mentioned improvements. With the death of Friedrich Arthur Uebel in 1963, the period of this manufactory ended with a serial number of about 17,000. Well-kept instruments from the time before Uebel's death are still sought after as second-hand instruments today. A well-preserved Theatermodel 702 fetches the highest prices.

== Legacy ==
In 2010, the manufacture of high-quality German and French system clarinets under the FAU label continued with the foundation of the company F. Arthur Uebel GmbH by Jürgen Stölzel from Wiesbaden, and the establishment of a new production facility in Markneukirchen.
