= Boehm system (clarinet) =

Clarinet keywork system developed circa 1840

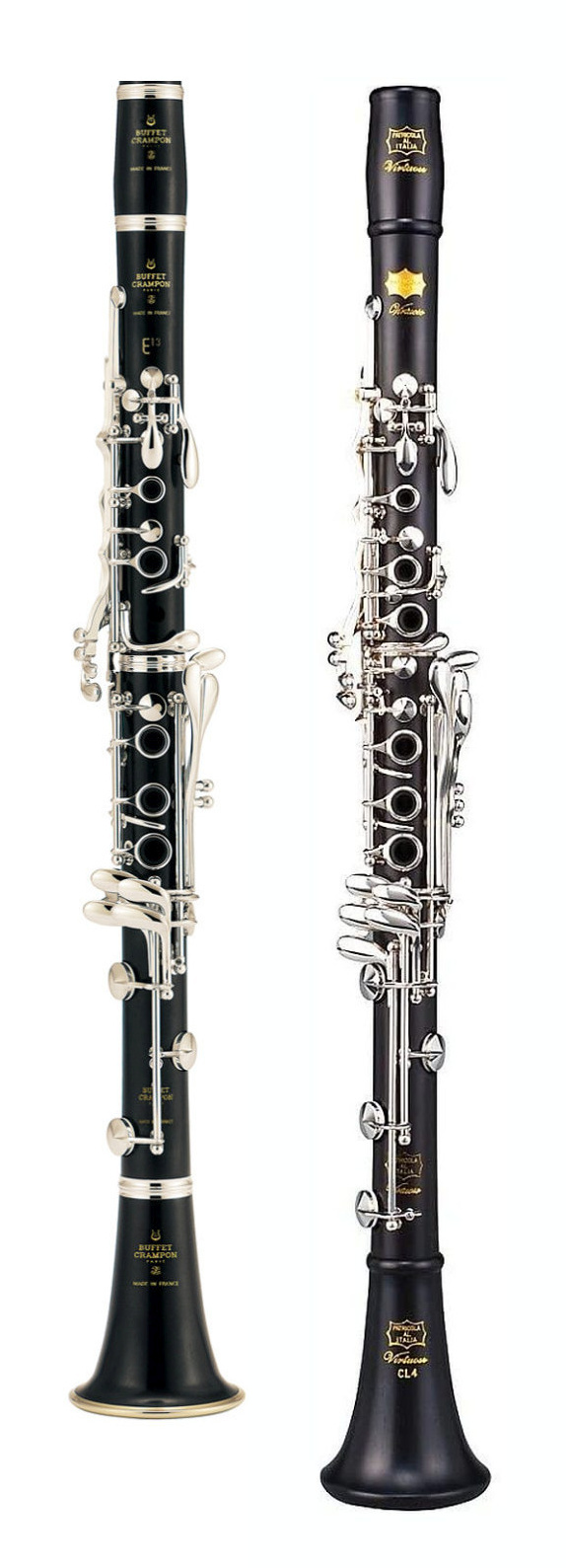
1. Boehm Clarinet with 17 keys and 6 rings; 2. Full-Boehm clarinet, range to E flat, with 20 keys, 7 rings and left E-flat-lever

The Boehm system for the clarinet is a system of clarinet keywork, developed between 1839 and 1843 by Hyacinthe Klosé and Auguste Buffet jeune. The name is somewhat deceptive; the system was inspired by Theobald Boehm's system for the flute, but necessarily differs from it, since the clarinet overblows at the twelfth rather than the flute's octave. Boehm himself was not involved in its development.

Klosé and Buffet took the standard soprano clarinet, adapted the ring and axle keywork system to correct serious intonation issues on both the upper and lower joints of the instrument, and added duplicate keys for the left and right little fingers, simplifying several difficult articulations throughout the range of the instrument.

The Boehm clarinet was initially most successful in France—it was nearly the only type of clarinet used in France by the end of the 1870s—but it started replacing the Albert system clarinet and its descendants in Belgium, Italy, and America in the 1870s and—following the example of Manuel Gómez, a prominent clarinettist in London who used the Boehm system and the Full Boehm system clarinet—in England in the 1890s. By the early twentieth century, virtually all clarinets used by performers outside of Germany, Austria, and Russia were of the Boehm system or one of its derivatives. The only alteration to Klosé and Buffet's clarinet that has wide currency is the Full Boehm system clarinet which was introduced by Buffet in the 1870s.

== Development ==
The clarinet was an inelegant instrument in the early 19th century despite the eight keys it had acquired. In 1812, Iwan Müller remodeled the instrument and raised the number of keys to 13. Other makers made small improvements to Müller's design, but the Boehm system clarinet represented the first complete redesign of the key system after Müller.

=== Changes ===
The ring keys Boehm created for his flute gave other instrument inventors the means to devise logical fingering systems that allowed for more physical agility. Ring keys and needle springs were the two major features adapted for Klosé and Buffet's new design. However, they did not incorporate Boehm's concept of full venting. Ring keys virtually eliminated the problems of cross-fingerings. These rings surround the tone holes so that when a finger covers the tone hole it also pushes a metal ring down to a level flush with the top of the hole. The ring, in turn, is connected to a long axle (borrowed directly from Boehm's flute), which then causes another hole located elsewhere on the instrument to be covered by a padded key. As an original invention for the clarinette à anneaux mobiles, Buffet utilized needle springs in order to control the opening and closing of keys mounted on axles. Needle springs are mounted on posts screwed directly into the wooden body of the clarinet and are used for all keys other than those with extremely short pivoting axles, which continue to make use of simple leaf springs attached longitudinally to the underside of each separate key. This is the method of operation of the keys on pre-Boehm woodwind instruments.

=== Results ===
The acoustics, tone, and technique of the Boehm system clarinet are decidedly different from the pre-Boehm clarinet. Shackleton writes, "In particular, it is easy to perceive that the pre-Boehm clarinet, with rather small tone holes spaced about 2 cm apart, should have very different characteristics from the Boehm instrument carrying tone holes every centimeter or so." The tone of individual notes and intonation of the scale depend on the precise relationship between the resonances. For example, if the second prominent resonance is not exactly an octave plus a fifth above the fundamental, the resonance will not be properly built and will therefore result in a less vibrant tone. The tone of the Boehm system clarinet is more open than its predecessors' veiled tone. Fork- and cross-fingerings create a greater number of closed holes—another cause of the pre-Boehm clarinet's dull tone. Due to the advancements in keywork, the Boehm system clarinet does not rely on many such fingerings, allowing for more open holes and a more vibrant tone that forgoes the unique color of the pre-Boehm clarinet. Furthermore, Boehm keying advancements notably improved the technical facility of its players. Boehm system clarinetists became able to play using more sequential fingering patterns, therefore improving the accuracy of fast passages.

=== Photos ===
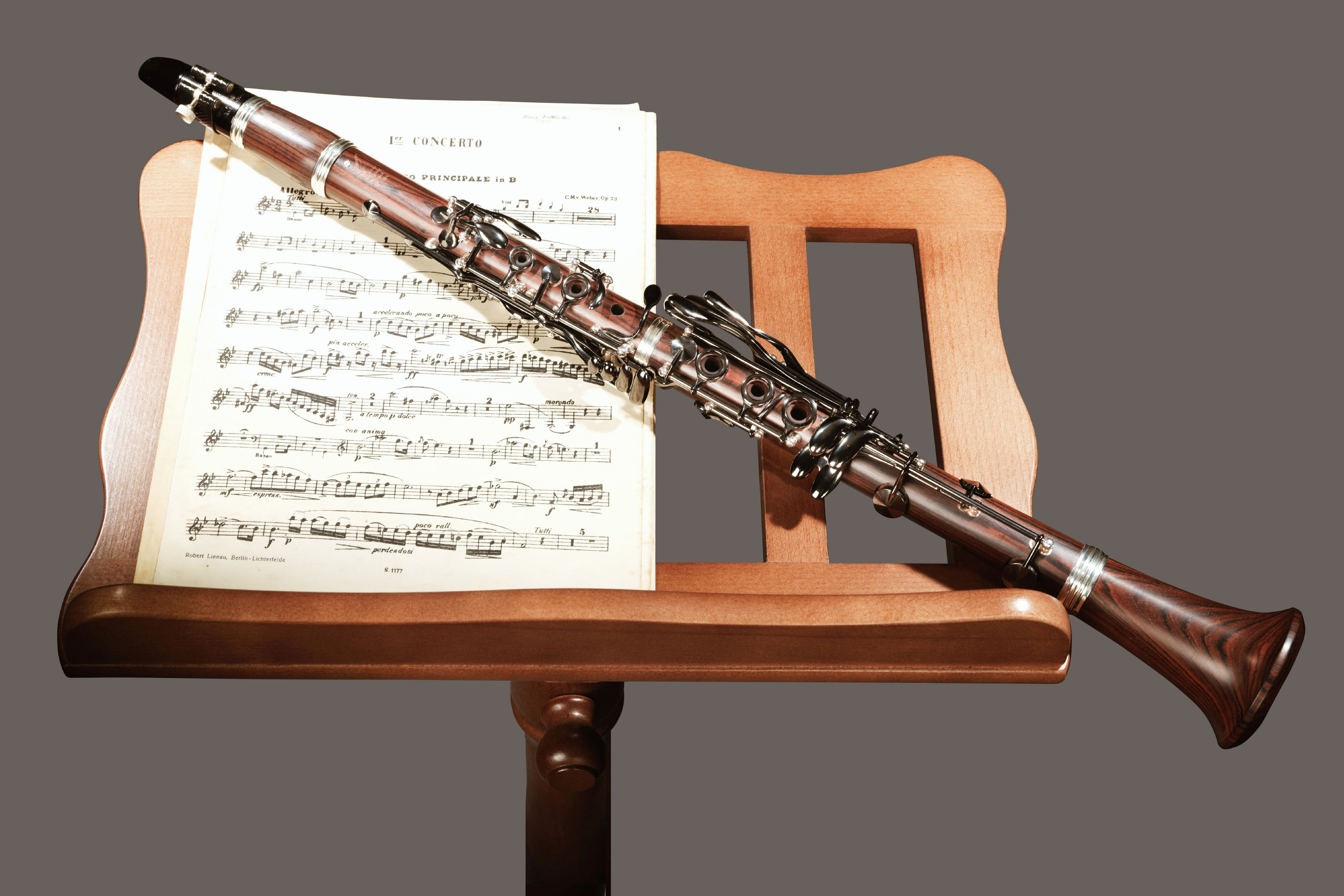
Boehm clarinet on music stand

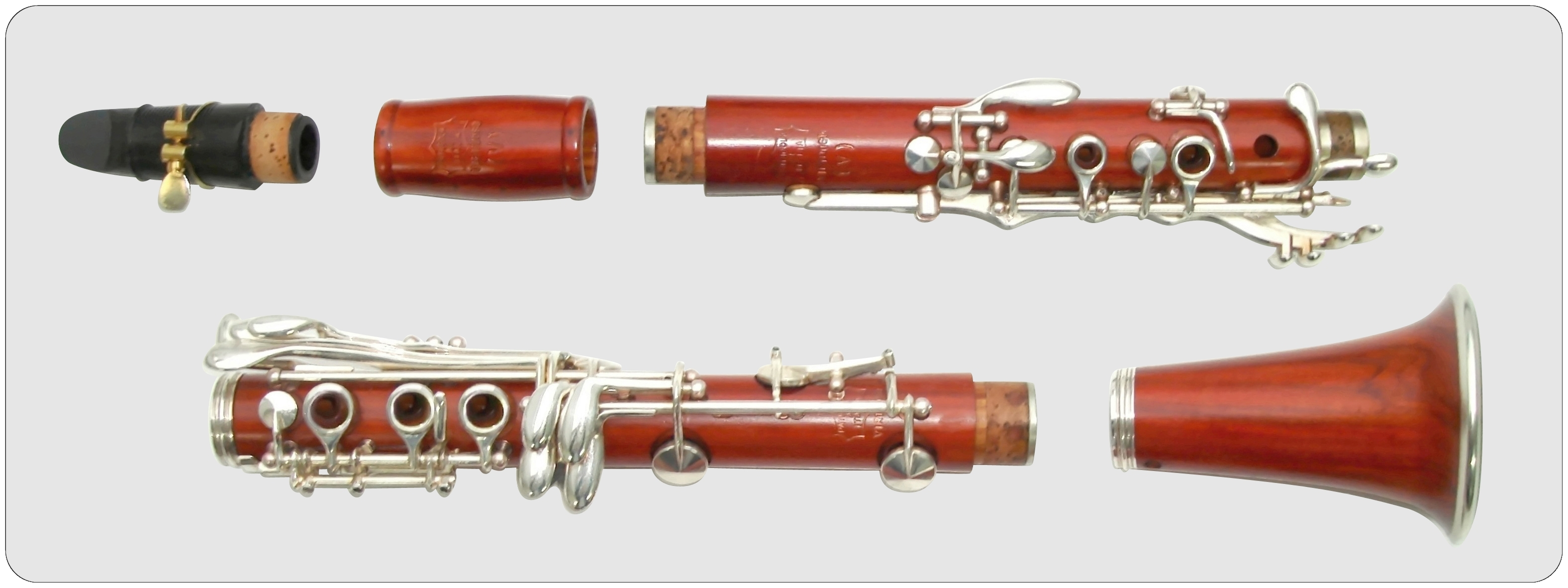
Mouthpiece, barrel, upper joint, lower joint, bell

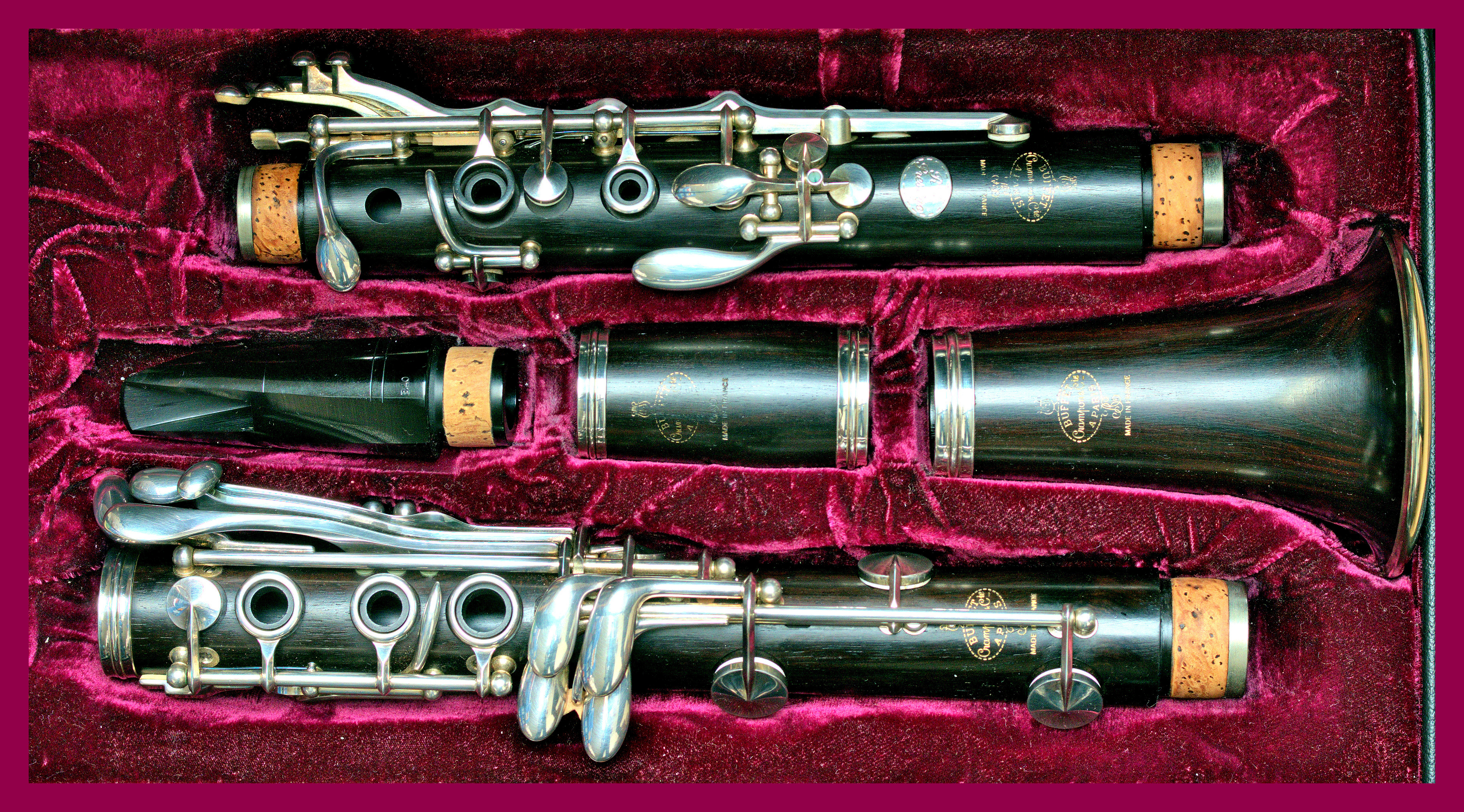
Components in case

== Full Boehm clarinet ==
The Full Boehm system clarinet is the only extensively accepted modification of Klosé and Buffet's 1843 design, though its added complexity, weight, and cost have kept it from supplanting the latter altogether. It features four improvements creating an even more streamlined fingering system. The first improvement was to include a seventh ring on the instrument; adding a cross-fingered E flat’/B flat’’ to the range, much like that of the modern saxophone. Next, an articulated C sharp’/G sharp’’ key was added; permitting a B/C sharp’ and F sharp’’/G sharp’’ trill to be made in nearly perfect pitch with a much simpler fingering pattern. A low E flat key was also added because it is a note that did not exist on previous clarinets and it is required by some composers. The addition of the E flat key is also convenient when A clarinet parts must be transposed at sight on the B flat instrument, so that the former's lowest note, (written) E (often called for because it is part of any clarinet system's practical range) may be played on the latter as (written) E flat. Finally, an alternate A flat/E flat’’ key for the left hand fourth finger was added, allowing more efficient fingering of certain passages.

== Other modified Boehm systems ==
Numerous other attempts have been made to create new clarinet key systems based on the Boehm system. None has achieved substantial acceptance, though some are still in use by a few musicians.

=== Mazzeo system ===
The Mazzeo system was invented by Rosario Mazzeo in the 1950s. Its main feature is a linkage operated by any one of the right-hand ring-key fingers which opens the third right-index-finger trill key for playing the throat B flat, instead of using the register key, thereby avoiding the tonal compromise that comes from using the tiny register key hole for venting B flat.

=== McIntyre system ===
The McIntyre system was patented on 9 January 1962 by Robert and Thomas McIntyre of Naugatuck, Connecticut. They developed a new mechanism for control of the throat notes (A flat, A, and B flat) using only the left hand rings, allowing these notes to be played without the need to move the position of the left hand. There are only three trill keys, rather than the standard Boehm system's four, for the right first finger. Otherwise the fingerings are the same as in the standard Boehm system.

The McIntyres produced and sold clarinets using their system, but faced an uphill battle in marketing them. Other than the need for the clarinetist to learn the new throat fingerings, the main drawbacks to the system were the weight and complexity of the mechanism. Lacking funds to work on improvements, the McIntyres tried to interest a major clarinet manufacturer in the system but were unable to reach an agreement, and production of the instrument ceased.

=== NX system ===
The NX system was developed by acoustician and clarinetist Arthur Benade from the 1970s until his death in 1987. The NX clarinet has a distinct bore shape. In addition, differences from the standard Boehm system include: separate holes for the register key and for throat B flat, operated by a single left thumb key via an automatic mechanism; elimination of some redundant tone holes, with some resulting changes in fingering; and modifications of tone hole spacings, tone hole depths, and key pad heights to minimize turbulence in the bore.

Canadian clarinet maker Stephen Fox has done further research along Benade's lines, and now offers custom built NX system clarinets for sale.

=== Bohlen–Pierce system ===
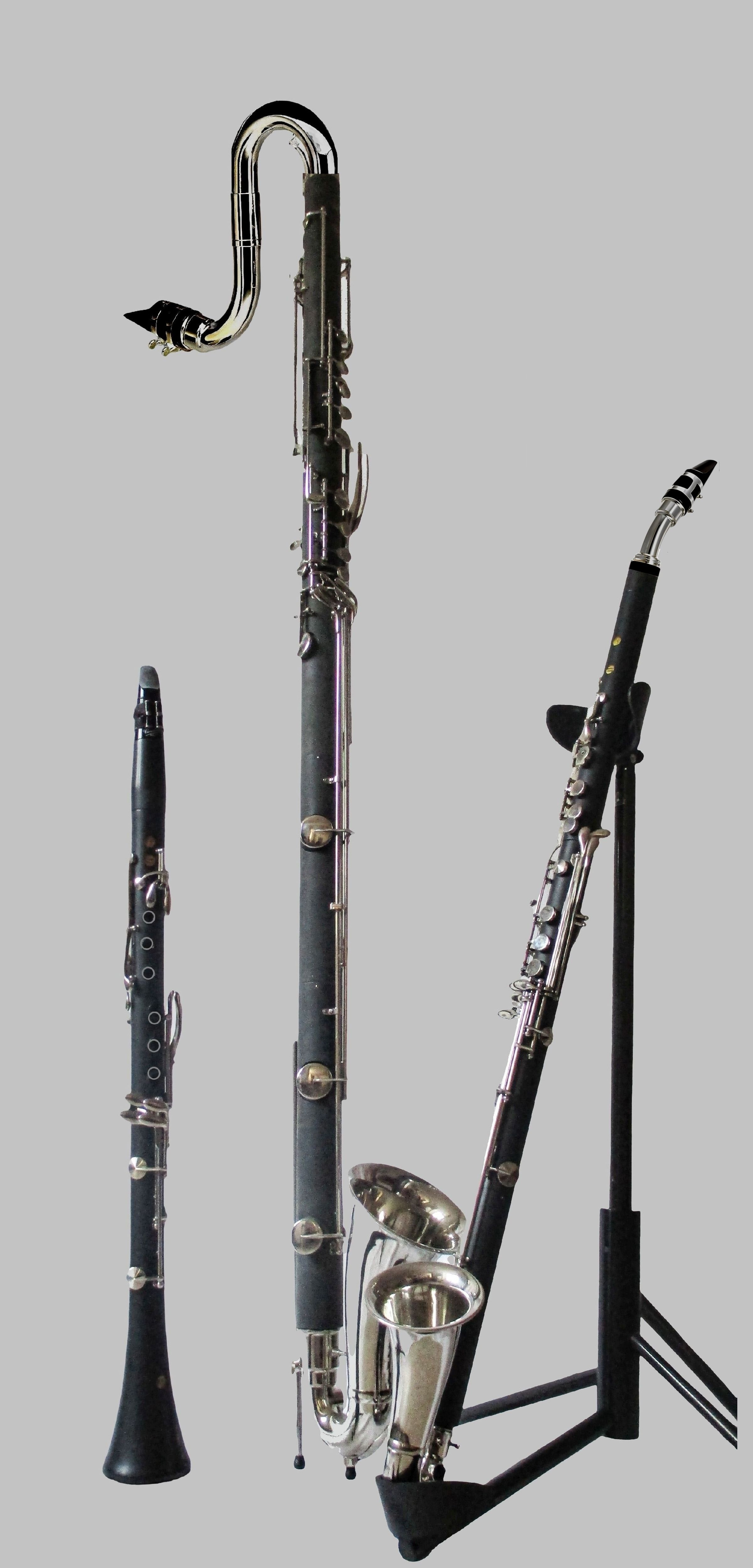
Bohlen–Pierce clarinet family: soprano, contra(bass) and tenor

The Bohlen–Pierce scale is a tone scale which divides the duodecimal into thirteen instead of twelve degrees, creating new soundscapes and listening experiences in the field of contemporary music. It can be relalised on aerophones with a cylindrical bore, such as clarinets and pan flutes, but also on metallophones and glockenspiels. A first concert with Bohlen–Pierce clarinets took place on 20 March 2008 at the University of Guelph, Ontario, Canada, followed by a concert on 13 June 2008 at the Hochschule für Musik und Theater Hamburg. The fingering system of the extremely rare Bohlen–Pierce clarinet is based on the Boehm system (clarinet), but has fewer keys.

=== Reform-Boehm system ===
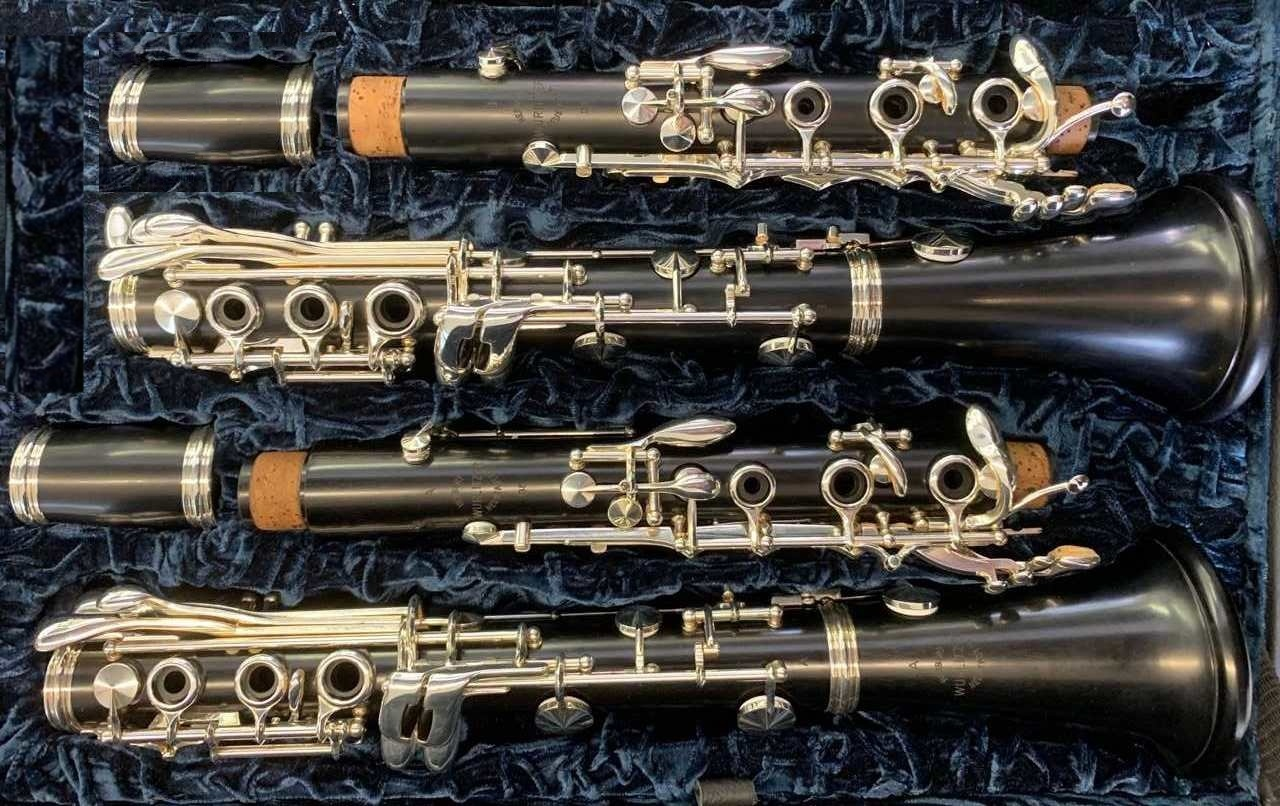
Reform Boehm clarinets

The Wurlitzer Reform Boehm system was developed around the middle of the 20th century by Fritz Wurlitzer, and Reform Boehm clarinets are currently made by "Herbert Wurlitzer Manufaktur für Holzblasinstrumente GmbH" in Neustadt an der Aisch and some other clarinet makers in Germany. The system combines the bore characteristics of Oehler system clarinets with Boehm fingerings. Differences between this system and standard Boehm in actual use include different altissimo fingerings, a smaller hand position, and greater bore resistance requiring more air to play.

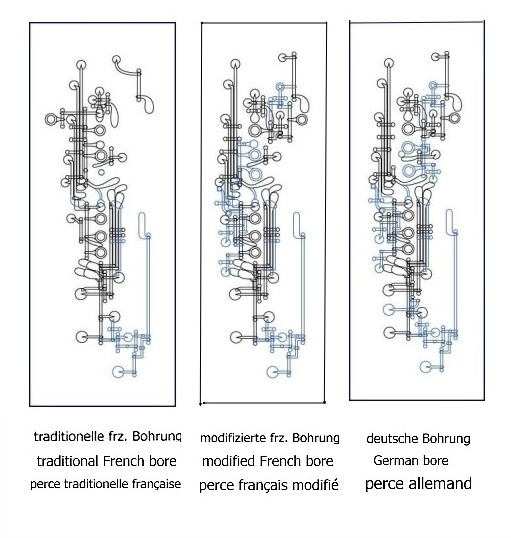
Configurators for the mechanical equipment of a modern Boehm clarinet with different bores in a modular design (options marked in blue)

=== Boehm clarinets in a modular design – Improvements by German clarinet makers ===
Not the big French manufacturers, but the relatively small German manufacturers offer Boehm clarinets optionally with additional mechanisms, which either improve the intonation or make it easier for the player to play certain passages through new redundant handles. First of all, these are the five mechanisms that Fritz Wurlitzer has developed for his Reform Boehm clarinet, but which can also be installed on normal Boehm clarinets. In order to avoid repetition, reference is made to the main article Reform Boehm system (Development, 2nd section). Other improvements:

6. A mechanism for a better change from low E to low F# or from B4 to C#5, which can also be used for the execution of corresponding trills.

7. B3/C#4 and F#5/G#5 trills

8. An additional resonance key on the right side of the lower joint to improve the sound of Bb3 and the F#5 (Acton mechanism)

9. In the case of a Boehm clarinet with a German bore, German rings can also be mounted on the upper joint instead of the French one (struck on the left side). This makes the connection of the rings on the upper and lower joint by a bridge on the right side obsolete.

Clarinets of this type are built at the highest quality level at appropriate prices. International soloists such as Charles Neidich, Shirley Brill and Richard Haynes have had such instruments made.

=== Outlook ===
In the medium term, the production of Full Boehm, Reform Boehm and Benade-NX clarinets is likely to be phased out. On the one hand, the industrially produced relatively inexpensive standard Boehm clarinets remained, one or the other top model perhaps still equipped with one or two extra keys, and on the other hand, the particularly high-quality soloist instruments individually made according to the wishes of the clarinetist by German and Austrian manufactories.
