= F. Arthur Uebel =

German manufacturer of clarinets

F. Arthur Uebel GmbH
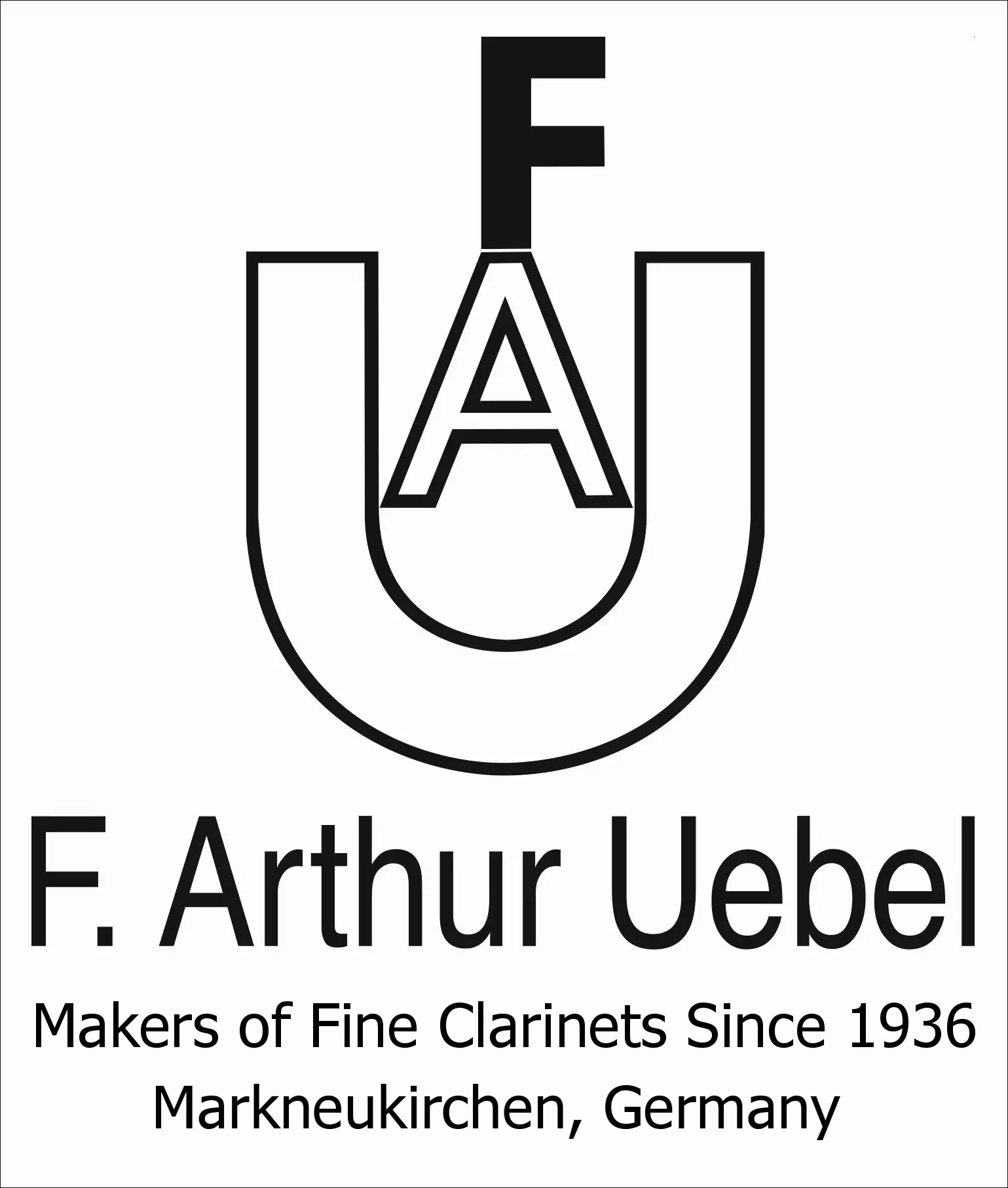

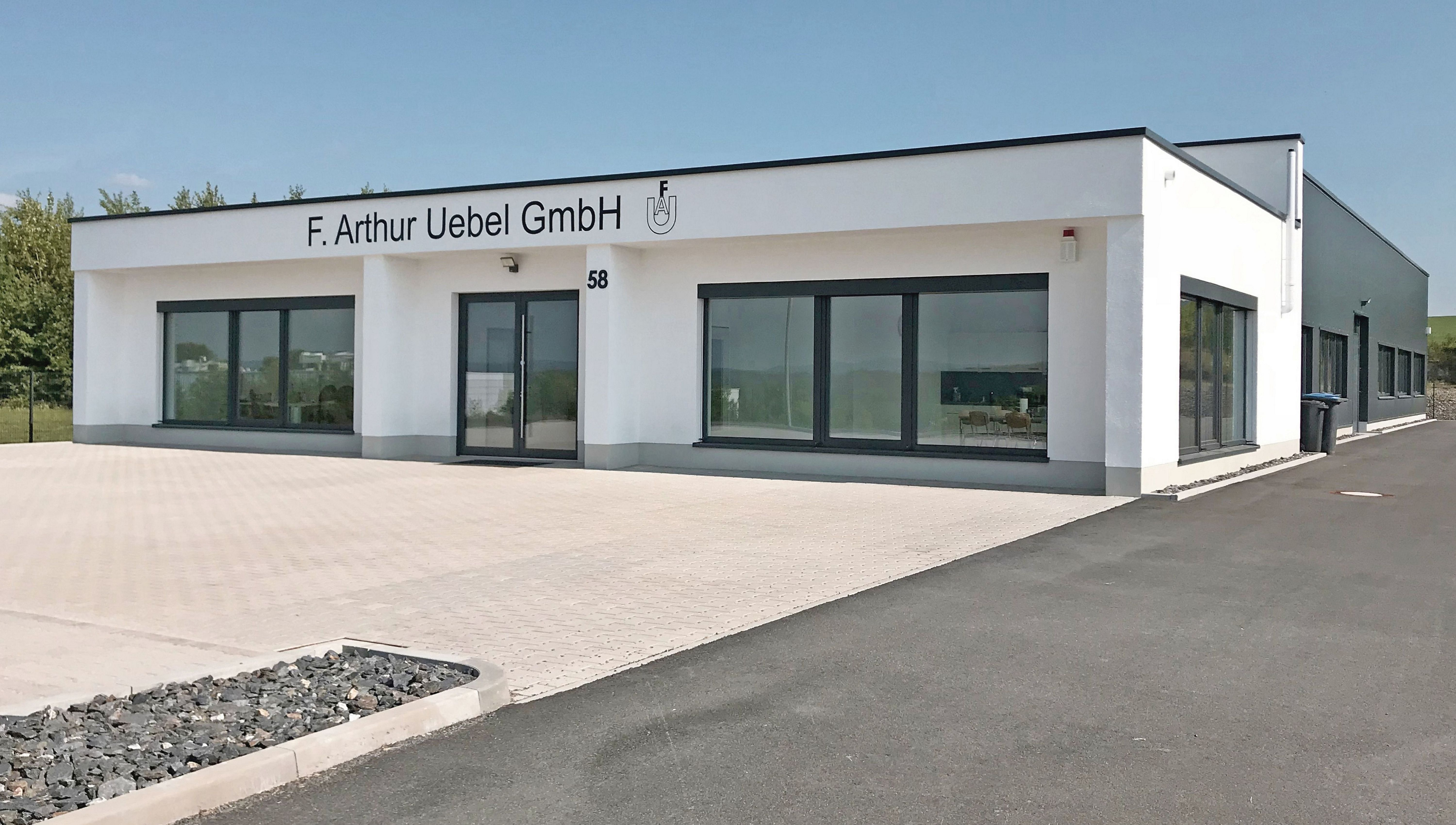
- New building (office and workshop) 2017
- Company type: Gesellschaft mit beschränkter Haftung (GmbH) (Germany)
- Industry: Manufacture of woodwind instruments
- Founded: 30 April 2010
- Headquarters: Wiesbaden, Branch office Markneukirchen
- Key people: Jürgen Stoelzel, Wiesbaden
- Products: Clarinets
- Website: en.uebel-klarinetten.de

The company F. Arthur Uebel GmbH (FAU) is a German manufacturer of clarinets with headquarters in Wiesbaden and production facilities in Markneukirchen (Saxony).

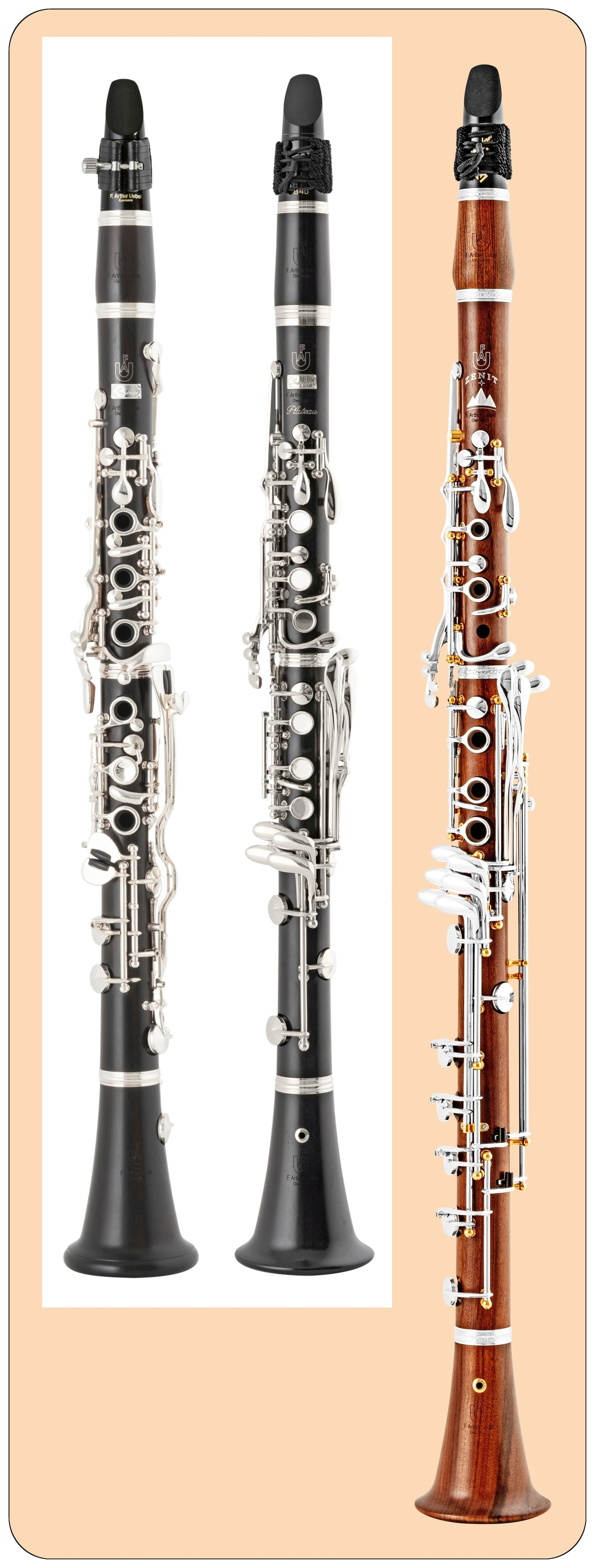
Clarinet Superior (german), Plateau-clarinet in B♭ (french) and basset clarinet in A (french)

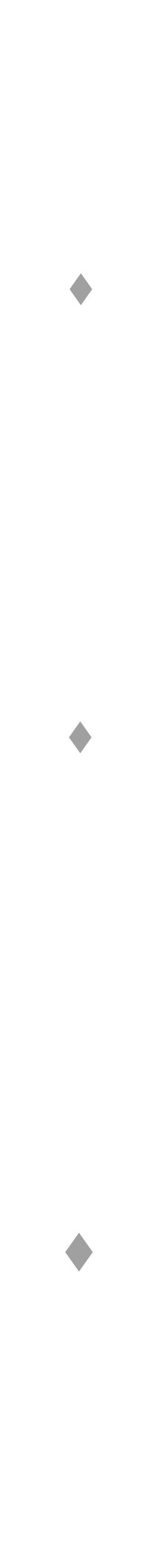

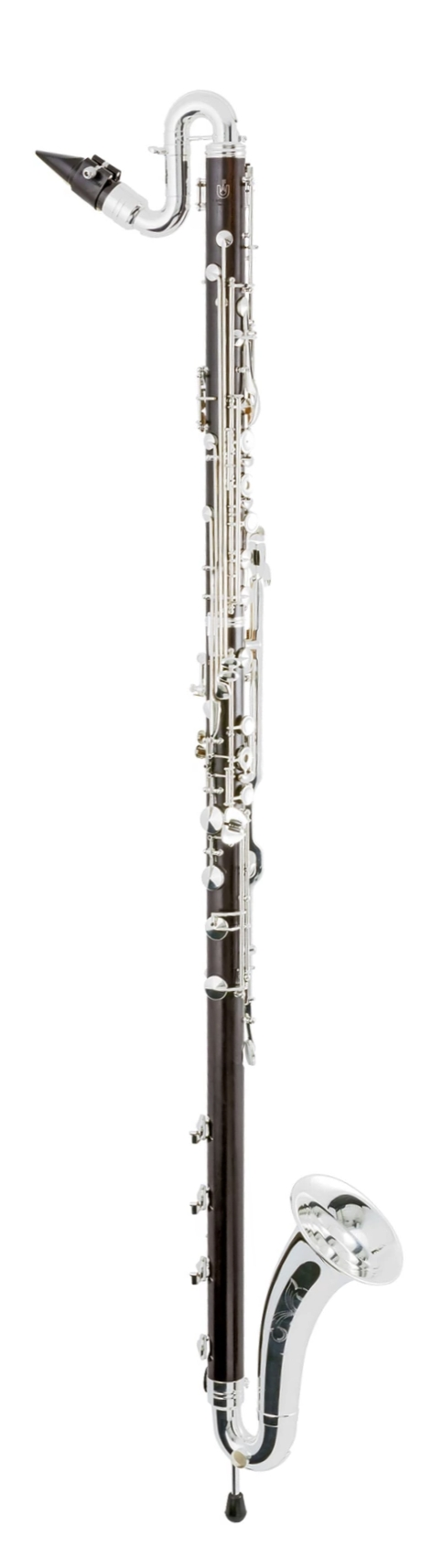
Bass clarinet, german

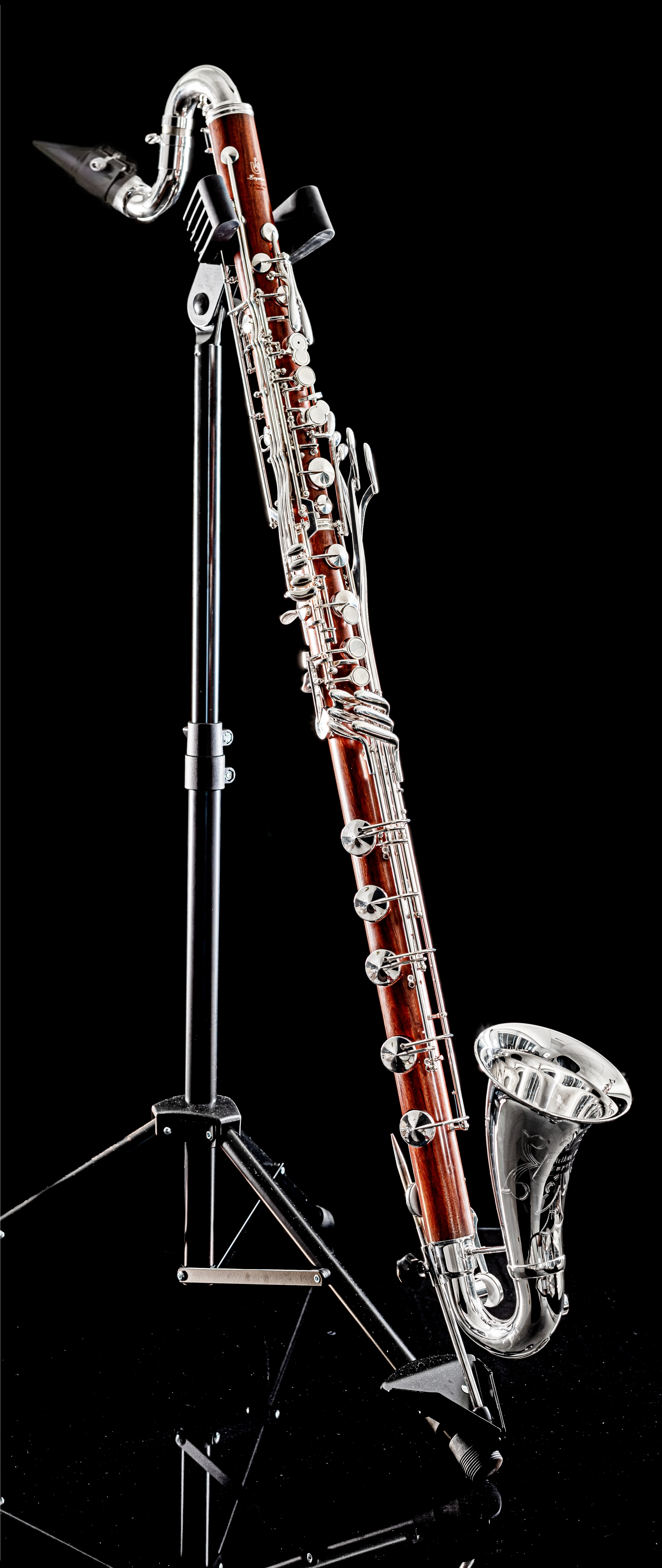
Bass clarinet, french

== History ==
The company, founded in 2010, sees itself in the tradition of the clarinet manufacture founded on 2 September 1936 by Friedrich Arthur Uebel (1888–1963) in 1936 in Markneukirchen. The latter was the son of the woodwind instrument maker Friedrich Gustav Uebel (1855-1915) and had learned the craft of clarinet making in his father's workshop. In 1911, he completed a traineeship with the clarinetist and clarinet maker Oskar Oehler (1858-1936) in Berlin, with whom he worked closely until Oehler's death on 1 October 1936, which meant that he was able to take over Oehler's customer base. He built high-quality instruments for professional clarinettists in addition to cheaper models. Although the main focus was on building Oehler clarinets, the company also made Boehm and Reform Boehm clarinets. He had already registered the trademark FAU in 1936.

In 1984, the factory was nationalised and merged with other wind instrument manufacturer. After the Peaceful Revolution, the company was privatised in 1990 and the production of Uebel clarinets continued as a dependent part of the business. In 2005, for economic reasons, the production of Uebel clarinets in Markneukirchen was discontinued.

In the course of the liquidation, the music wholesaler Arnold Stölzel GmbH in Wiesbaden, managing director Jürgen Stölzel, acquired the rights to the name as well as the design and production documents in 2005 and then, also with the help of former Uebel employees, had a very modern production facility built in China, where Uebel clarinets were prefabricated from around mid-2006 under the direction of a German master clarinet maker and from materials supplied by Germany, which were then finished in Wiesbaden and distributed. In 2010 Jürgen Stölzel founded the current company in Wiesbaden with a branch in Markneukirchen and set up a workshop there, where Uebel clarinets are also again manufactured. In 2017, the company moved to a newly built production facility with an office extension in the Markneukirchen industrial park.

The company manufactures clarinets with German and French system (Oehler / Boehm) as well as accessories. The product line of Boehm clarinets has been greatly expanded in recent years.

== Products ==
All clarinet models are made of grenadilla with silver-plated machine heads, the higher-priced ones also of mopane with silver-plated or gold-plated machine heads or with gold-plated pillars and otherwise silver machine heads. The keys are made partly of vacuum casting and partly of nickel silver and are completely fitted by an instrument maker. The instruments are manufactured in Germany and in China, whereby the final assembly or regulation always takes place in Germany (Markneukirchen or Wiesbaden).

With the German system, four soloist models are offered in B♭ tunings, one of which is an Austrian model (Vienna) and one of which is also available as an A clarinet. Furthermore, two standard models in B♭ and A and one in E♭ are produced, as well as three beginner models in B♭, one in C and one in low G, and finally a professional bass clarinet reaching down to low C.

With the French system there are seven professional instruments in B♭ and A, one of them also as a basset clarinet in A and another also as a C and as an E♭ clarinet and as basset horn, besides – as a special feature – a plateau (capped) clarinet in B♭. Then three standard models in B♭ and a bass clarinet reaching down to low C are offered.

== Artists ==
Well-known F. A. Uebel players include: Giora Feidman, Alexander von Hagke, Ricardo Morales, Danny Goldman, Evgeny Petrov, Nicholas Carpenter, Björn Nyman, Danila Yankovsky, David Rowden, Gerald Kraxberger, Thomas Watmough, Thorsten Skringer, Giovanni Bertoni, Mitchel Berick and Michael Kirby.
