= Herbert Wurlitzer =

German clarinet manufacturer

Herbert Wurlitzer Manufaktur für Holzblasinstrumente GmbH
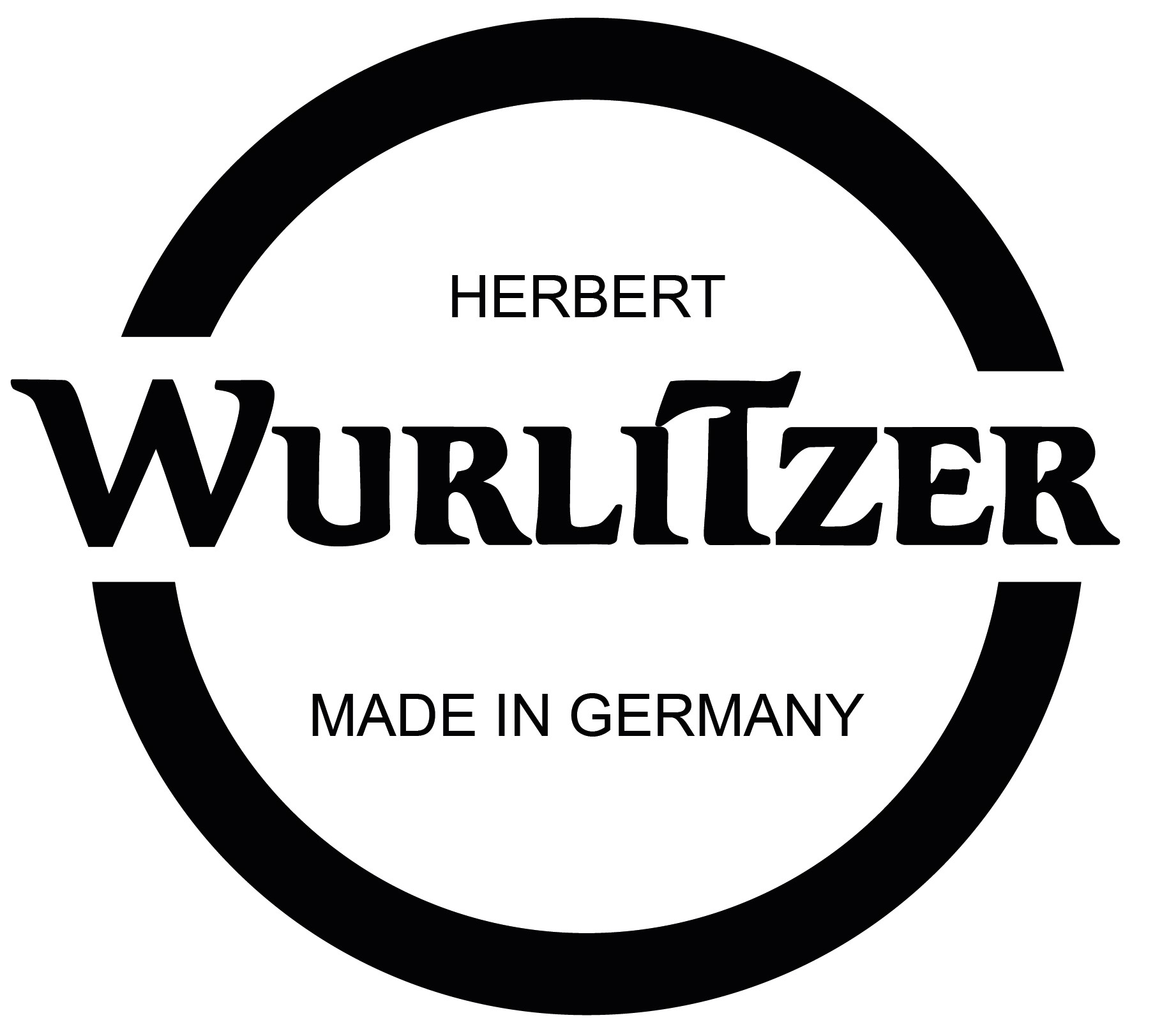

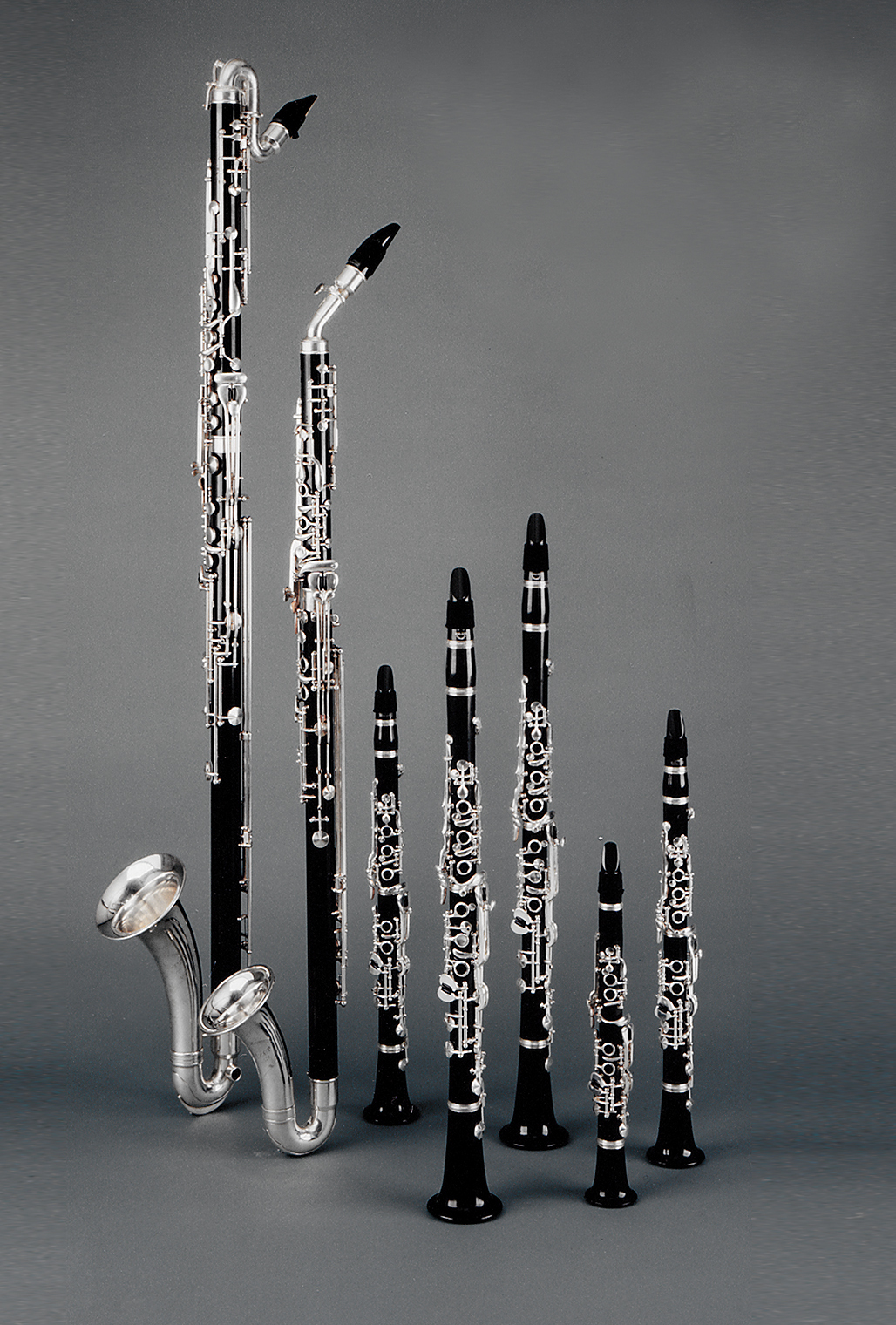
- Bass clarinet, Basset horn, clarinets in D, B♭, A, high G + E♭, Basset clarinet in A (German system / Oehler)
- Genre: instrument makers
- Founded: 1959 by Herbert Wurlitzer
- Headquarters: Neustadt an der Aisch Germany
- Key people: Fritz-Ulrich Wurlitzer, Bernd Wurlitzer
- Products: Clarinets, the whole family in Oehler system and Reform Boehm system
- Number of employees: 20
- Website: Wurlitzer clarinets

The company Herbert Wurlitzer Manufaktur für Holzblasinstrumente GmbH is a German clarinet manufacturer based in Neustadt an der Aisch, Bavaria with a second production site in Markneukirchen, Saxony. It was founded in 1959 by Herbert Wurlitzer. His father Fritz Wurlitzer operated since the 1930s in Erlbach, now a district of Markneukirchen, a manufactory for the production of clarinets. The company W. Wurlitzer makes clarinets with German System (Oehler fingering system) and with the "Reform Boehm system", developed by Fritz Wurlitzer in the late 1940s, an instrument with Boehm fingering system and the sound of an Oehler Clarinet.

== Biography ==
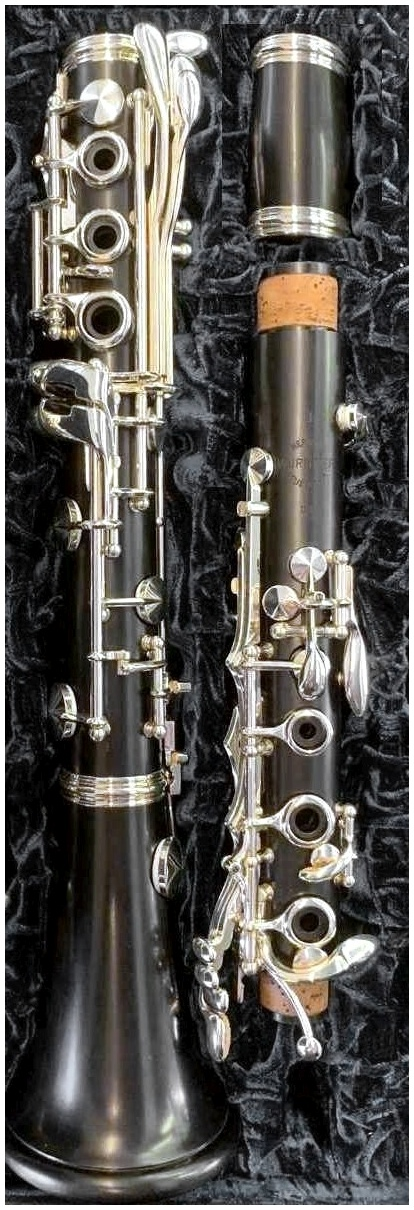
Reform Boehm clarinet in B♭

Herbert Wurlitzer escaped from East Germany in 1959 with his family into the Federal Republic of Germany. Here he built a manufactory for the production of clarinets, as he had learned from his father in Erlbach, Vogtland.

He managed the company until his death in 1989 together with his wife Ruth Wurlitzer. Ruth Wurlitzer continued the business together with Bernd Wurlitzer, her son-in-law as commercial director and her son Frank-Ulrich as artistic director. Since the death of Ruth in September 2014 the company is run only by Frank-Ulrich and Bernd Wurlitzer.

== The enterprise ==
The extensive family Wurlitzer (there is also an American branch) has been manufacturing musical instruments for several generations.

The company Herbert Wurlitzer was initially located in Bubenreuth / Bavaria and moved its headquarters in 1964 to Neustadt an der Aisch. In 1992, the company built another production site in Markneukirchen, where numerous musical instrument makers are based. In this context, it also took over the former workshop of Fritz Wurlitzer, which was integrated into the new production after some time.

The company produces almost all clarinets of the clarinet family (with the exception of the very rare double bass clarinet and the contralto clarinet). All instruments are made only of wood, mainly grenadilla wood, but also cocobolo and boxwood are available. They are made exclusively to order individually. Herbert Wurlitzer acquired with his company a significant position nationally and internationally.The main exporting countries are the Netherlands, Italy, Spain and Japan. There was and still is a low distribution in the USA.

Wurlitzer clarinets are represented in Germany and some other countries in numerous cultural orchestras.
