= Buffet family =

The Buffet family was a family of French musical instrument makers.

== Denis Buffet-Auger ==
Denis Buffet-Auger, born Denis Buffet, was born 28 July 1783 in La Couture, near Dreux into a family of woodturners. He became known as Buffet-Auger after his marriage to Marie-Anne Auger. In 1825 he set up a workshop in Paris making instruments, a business that was to become the Buffet Crampon company, still in operation and one of the foremost manufacturers of woodwind instruments. Jean Louis Buffet was his son. Denis Buffet-Auger died on 24 Sep 1841 in Paris.

== Auguste Buffet jeune ==
Auguste Buffet jeune (full name Louis-Auguste Buffet) was born 6 August 1789 in La Couture, a younger brother of Denis Buffet-Auger. Auguste was making musical instruments in La Couture by 1813, but by 1830 had moved his workshop to Paris. In the 1830s he designed and built two new bass clarinets, developed an improved Boehm system flute (with flutist Victor Coche), and, with H.E. Klosé, invented the so-called Boehm system clarinet, the system still most commonly in use outside of Germany, Austria, and Russia for clarinets. In the early 1840s, with P.J.R. Soler, he developed a Boehm system oboe; this, however, was less successful. Louis-Auguste Buffet was his son. Auguste Buffet jeune died on 30 Sep 1864 in Anet.

== Jean Louis Buffet ==
Jean Louis Buffet, also known as Jean Louis Buffet-Crampon, was born 18 July 1813 in La Couture, son of Denis Buffet-Auger. By about 1830 he had begun to work at the musical instrument manufacturing firm established by his father, and at the latter's death in 1841 he took over the company. Buffet married Zoë Crampon in 1836, and by 1844 his firm was known as Buffet Crampon. He died in Paris on 17 April 1865.

== Louis Auguste Buffet ==
Louis Auguste Buffet was born 15 July 1816 in Anet, son of Auguste Buffet jeune. By 1845 Auguste (as Louis Auguste called himself) was working in his father's workshop in Paris. Between 1859 and 1862 he was awarded several patents relating to woodwind instrument making, and in 1864, when his father died, he took over operation of the business. He died on 7 April 1884 in Paris.
