= Ernst Heinrich Roth =

German luthier (1877–1948)

Ernst Heinrich Roth (1877–1948), also often referred to as Ernst Heinrich Roth I to distinguish him from later family members of the same name, was a German luthier and master of a large and successful violin-making workshop in the East German town of Markneukirchen, near the current border with the Czech Republic. He was the most important and distinguished figure in a whole dynasty of Roth luthiers active in Germany over many generations and to this day.

== Early life ==
Roth's father, the violin-maker Gustav Robert Roth, founded a violin shop in Markneukirchen in 1873. Ernst Heinrich was born there in 1877 and learned to play the violin, viola, cello, piano and trumpet. He had perfect pitch and absorbed an excellent sense of craftsmanship in his father's workshop. He travelled extensively to violin makers in Italy, Austria, Hungary, Russia and France in order to perfect his art.

== Career ==
In 1902, at the age of 25 and together with his cousin Gustav August Ficker, Ernst Heinrich Roth started his own violin-making business, where over the years he worked in conjunction with apprentices, many of whom went on to become well-known violin makers in their own right. The exact extent of Ernst Heinrich Roth's involvement in the making of his instruments has long been a topic for debate, but it is now generally believed that the best instruments were made mainly by Roth himself. The instruments of the Ernst Heinrich Roth workshop were soon in demand all over Europe.

Ernst Heinrich Roth had two sons: Gustav Albert and Ernst Heinrich II. Albert Roth learnt the luthier trade from his father. Ernst Heinrich Roth II, on the other hand, received a training in commerce and in 1921 settled in the United States, where he founded a trading company, Scherl & Roth. It is through this company that many Roth instruments, bows and other merchandise came onto the North American market, where quite a number of them, from different periods and of very uneven quality, can be found to this day. As a matter of fact, quality Roth instruments from the most sought-after period (see below) are, to this day, harder to find in Germany than in the United States. This goes some way towards explaining the fact that, generally speaking, Roth instruments are better known in the US than in their original country of provenance.

In addition to violins, the Roth workshop also manufactured other string instruments (among them, famously, a 1927 double bass owned and played by American jazz bassist Charles Mingus). The Roth company continued successfully in Markneukirchen until the beginning of the Third Reich. From that time onwards, the political climate prohibited the sale of fine instruments to countries unfriendly towards Nazi Germany, and the labour force had to be reduced as a consequence. Nevertheless, some instruments, though of lesser quality, continued to be produced after 1933 and throughout the war years, in difficult circumstances and without the collaboration of Roth's son Albert, who was drafted into the army from the very beginning of the war. During these trying years, Ernst Heinrich Roth was left to continue the business alone except for the help of a couple of elderly colleagues.

In 1945 Albert Roth returned from the war and efforts were made to rekindle the business, but due to restrictions trading out of the Soviet-occupied zone, this proved difficult. Ernst Heinrich Roth I died in Markneukirchen in 1948.

Albert Roth took over the management of the business, but the company was liquidated by court order on account of a breach of regulations. Albert Roth then decided to move to Bubenreuth in the municipality of Erlangen, in the newly founded Federal Republic of Germany, and in April 1953 the company started trading again from there. Soon the Roth company was once more supplying instruments to Europe and the USA. Albert Roth died in 1961.

After Albert's death, his son Ernst Heinrich Roth III, having learned the violin-making trade at the technical college in Bubenreuth from 1953 to 1955 and been awarded the master craftsman's certificate in 1961, was in charge of the management. Business expanded and new markets were developed in the Far East. Since 1985 Wilhelm Roth, the son of Ernst Heinrich III, has been active in the company, having trained at the renowned violin-making college in Mittenwald. At the moment the Ernst Heinrich Roth company is managed by Ernst Heinrich Roth III and Wilhelm Roth. A branch office in Markneukirchen represents the company in the town where it originated. In addition to producing new instruments, the company can authenticate vintage Ernst Heinrich Roth instruments from their company records (www.roth-violins.de).

== Appraisal ==
An E. H. Roth violin, Guarneri copy, Markneukirchen 1930

It was a policy of the Roth workshop in the days of Ernst Heinrich I to manufacture different grades of instruments for different budgets. For this reason, but also due to the size of the workshop's production and the many decades of its operation, the quality of Roth violins varies greatly, ranging from poor to outstanding. Therefore, expertise in the field is essential in order to identify the highest grade Roth instruments.

The finest Roth instruments are often described as beautifully crafted with a strong, resonant tone. Instruments made between the 1920s and around 1933 are widely considered among the most desirable. During this period, Roth violins were played and appreciated by notable artists such as Eugène Ysaÿe, Henri Marteau, and Mischa Mischakoff.

Many experts attribute the highest-quality instruments of this era primarily to the work of Ernst Heinrich Roth himself, particularly those bearing his hand signature. These instruments were typically modeled after early 18th-century Cremonese designs, most commonly Stradivari and Guarneri del Gesù, though examples inspired by Amati and Ruggieri also exist.

These instruments are distinguished by the quality of their materials, including fine-grained spruce for the top and strongly flamed maple for the back. Their oil varnish, often a red-brown color over a warm golden ground, and their carefully shaped f-holes are also frequently noted. Combined with a rich, focused tone and clear projecting overtones, these characteristics have contributed to their reputation as capable orchestral and solo instruments.

In addition to their musical qualities, well-preserved examples have attracted attention from collectors, with auction results reflecting growing interest (for example, a Roth cello sold for US $17,250 at Tarisio New York in November 2005).

While some instruments from later periods and from other members of the family have been known to be of above-average quality, none reached anywhere near the level attained by the best instruments of the aforementioned period.

== Labels ==
An Ernst Heinrich Roth label, as they appeared on the instruments made from the mid-1920s to the mid-1930s

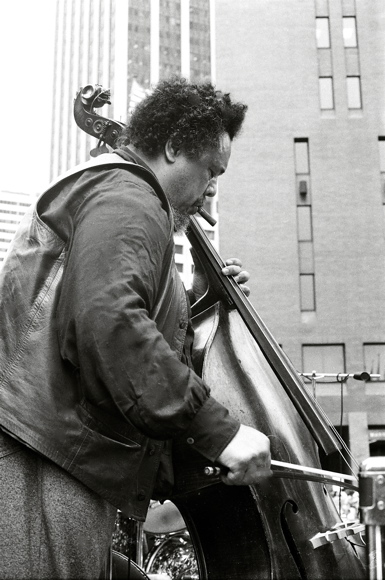
American jazz bassist Charles Mingus playing his 1927 Roth bass (1976)

The labels of the mid 20s to early 30s were usually printed in cursive script saying:

Ernst Heinrich Roth

Markneukirchen 19(--)

Reproduction of

Antonius Stradivarius

Cremona 17(--)

or

Ernst Heinrich Roth

Markneukirchen 19(--)

Reproduction of

Josef Guarnerius

Cremona 17(--)

Note: The first name is sometimes mistakenly read as 'Erush'. It is written in old German running writing and is definitely meant to be 'Ernst'. The word 'Germany' is also often printed on the label in purple or black ink. In addition to the label, there is usually an oval-shaped brand stamp inside the instrument reading: Ernst Heinrich Roth / Markneukirchen, followed by a serial number.

== Gradations ==
The following are the standard gradations as listed in the 1920s Roth catalogues - the closer to the top of the list, the higher the quality of the violin:

- XIR: copy of either Stradivari or Guarneri, often made to order for specific well-known artists (look for an extra label inside the violin stating the commissioner's name) and always hand-signed across the main label by Roth himself (a guarantee of highest grade Roth instruments)

- XR: copy of Stradivari 1725

- IXR: copy of Guarneri 1736

- VIIIR: copy of Stradivari 1724

- VIIR: copy of Stradivari 1722

- VIR: copy of Guarneri 1732

- VR: copy of Ruggieri

- IVR: copy of Stradivari 1718

- IIIR: copy of Amati

- IIR: copy of Guarneri 1734

- IR: copy of Stradivari 1714
