= Reform Boehm system =

System of keywork for the clarinet

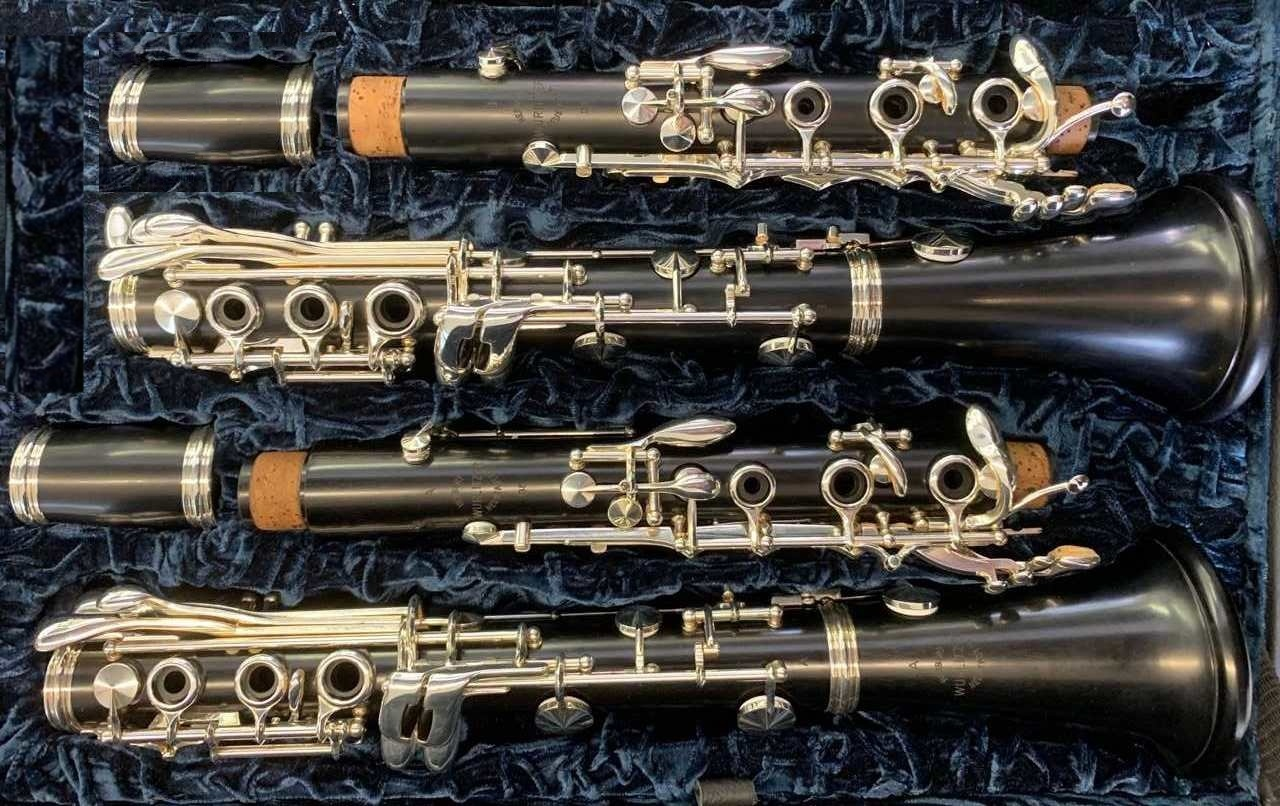
Wurlitzer Reform Boehm clarinets in B♭ and A with additional mechanisms

The Reform Boehm system is a fingering system for the clarinet based on the Boehm system. It was developed to produce clarinets with the Boehm keywork but with a sound similar to a German clarinet.

== Development ==
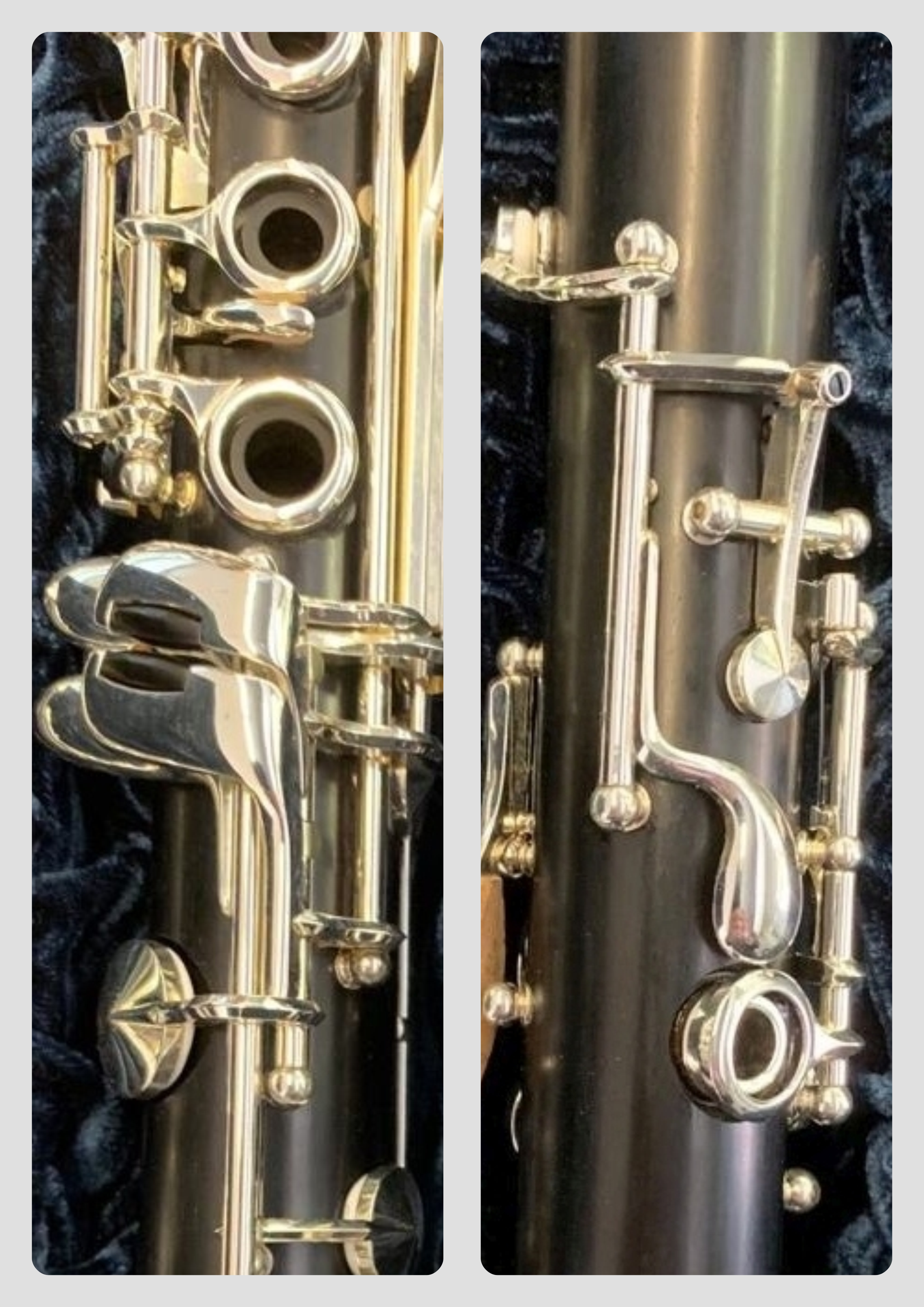
1. roller connection
2. register key with B♭-improvement

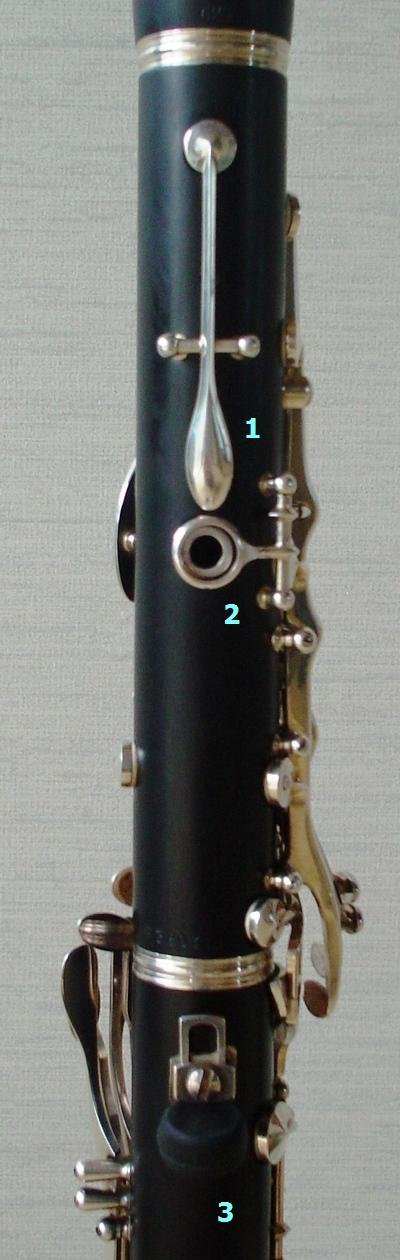
Boehm register key

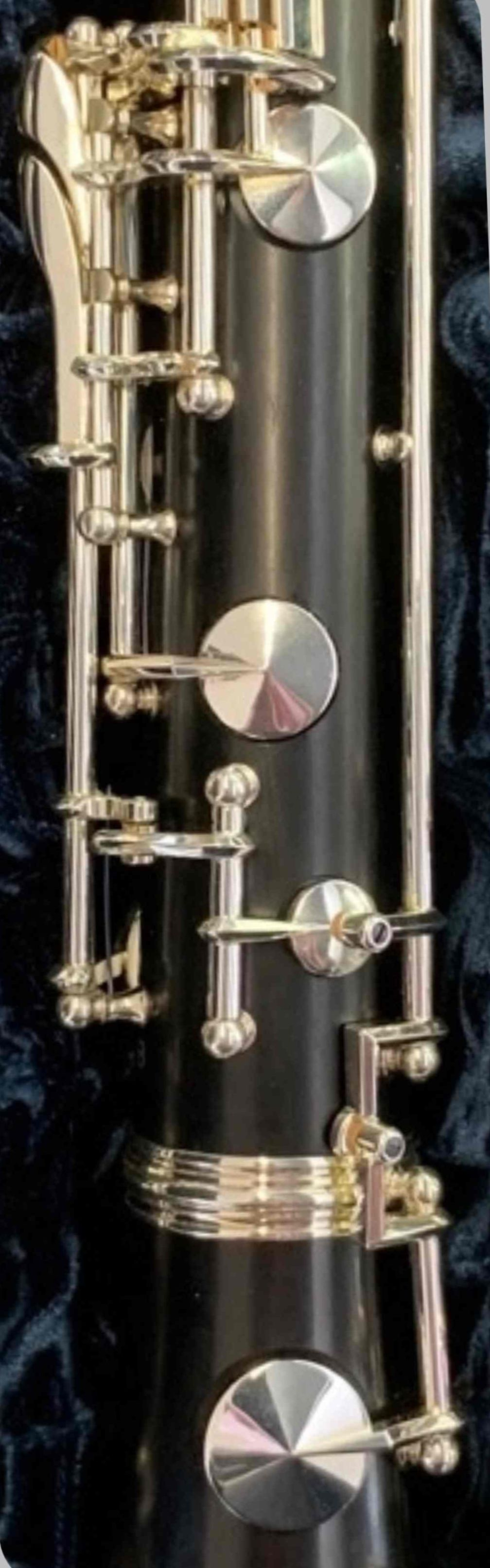
deep E/F improvement

Reform Boehm clarinet in B♭ (or A), details

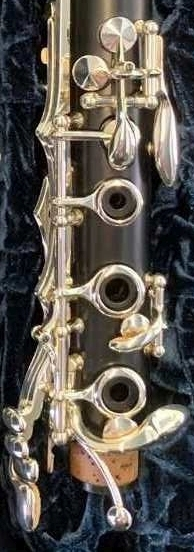
3rd ring on the upper joint and key for C(♯) / G(♯) with extension for the right index finger

The Reform Boehm system was invented by German clarinetist Ernst Schmidt (1870–1954), who used the original Boehm system as early as 1895. Schmidt made changes to the Boehm clarinet based on scientific and mathematical principles. The new instrument had rollers between two little-finger keys in the right hand, and a modified bore that produced a different sound character. Schmidt named the instrument the "Reform Boehm clarinet". In the second half of the 1940s, master clarinet maker Fritz Wurlitzer, based in Erlbach, (Note: Now a district of Markneukirchen.) Vogtland / Saxony, built a clarinet with Schmidt's instructions. They had collaborated earlier in producing the Schmidt-Kolbe clarinet, a variant of the German clarinet. Both modified a clarinet with the Boehm fingering system to sound like an Oehler (German) clarinet. Wurlitzer built a Boehm clarinet with less taper, which impaired the intonation, but compensated for this by shortening the lower joint by a few millimeters and offsetting the lower tone holes. He also fitted it with a German-style mouthpiece. In 1949 he sent the first Reform Boehm clarinet to a clarinetist of the Concertgebouw Orchestra in Amsterdam.

A Reform Boehm clarinet looks similar to an original Boehm clarinet, although some brands or models exhibit some of these differences:

1. The right-hand little finger C and E♭ keys have rollers as on a German clarinet.
2. The register key is like the key on German clarinets, with the corresponding tone hole on the left side.
3. There is a ring on the upper joint tone hole for the C. This can be found on some Boehm clarinets, but is not common.
4. There is a G♯ key for the right index finger.
5. There is an improved low E/F key.

== Current level of popularity ==
Initially Reform Boehm clarinets were built only by Fritz Wurlitzer, and later by his son Herbert Wurlitzer, followed by other manufacturers in Germany (Leitner & Kraus, Wolfgang Dietz, Harald Hüyng) and Japan (Yamaha). Major French instrument producers were not interested in the Reform Boehm clarinets. Most customers were clarinetists in the Netherlands, Spain, Italy and Japan. Instruments from the GDR were used in the Eastern Bloc until 1990. Distribution in the United States has always been low.

Manufacturers sold fewer Reform Boehm clarinets than German system clarinets, possibly due to the relatively high price of the instrument and a smaller market. Yamaha discontinued production several years ago. As of 2019 The production of these instruments was declining, but they are still made by various German manufacturers. Instead of Reform Boehm clarinets "it has recently become increasingly evident that more and more professional clarinetists, in collaboration with instrument makers, are developing individual instruments constructed for the needs of the musicians, based either on the German or the French system." Working with the basic ideas of Fritz Wurlitzer, the Canadian manufacturer Stephen Fox has developed clarinets in B♭ and A, wanting "to blend the focus and cleanness of the German sound with the brilliance and projection of the French clarinet, with superior intonation." Their development is based on a Buffet R13 clarinet and a Reform Boehm clarinet by Herbert Wurlitzer.

Producers of Boehm clarinets have adopted new drilling techniques, and the sound of a modern Boehm clarinet is not far away from that of the Reform Boehm clarinet or that of a German clarinet.
