= Arnold Voigt =

Arnold Voigt (1864 - 1952) was a stringed instrument maker and luthier of the 19th to 20th century. He was born in Markneukirchen, and worked there from 1890 till his death. During that time, he made copies of Stradivari and other types of Cremonese violins.

He was a student of Heinrich Theodor Heberlein, who he studied under for six years. He was the first of the Voigt family to settle in England (from 1885 and 1890) and some of his stringed instruments, especially his violins, were made there. In 1890, he returned to and settled in Markneukirchen.

The family of Voigt is largely associated with the London-based firm of that name, but it is true that the Voigt family never really gave up its German roots. This was truly a large family - the French authority René Vannes lists no less than 43 violin makers of that name. Arnold Voigt (1864 - 1952), who was a student of Heberlein, in fact spent merely 5 years in London - from 1885 to 1890. For the rest, he lived and worked in his birth city - Markneukirchen, where he also died. He was prolific in his output as violinmaker, but Henly also calls him "an expert bow maker. Faithful representations of celebrated models worked with an artistic eye."
