= Fritz Wurlitzer =

German clarinet maker

- Born: 21 December 1888; Erlbach
- Died: 5 April 1984 (aged 95); Markneukirchen
- Occupation: Clarinet maker
- Known for: Reform Boehm clarinet

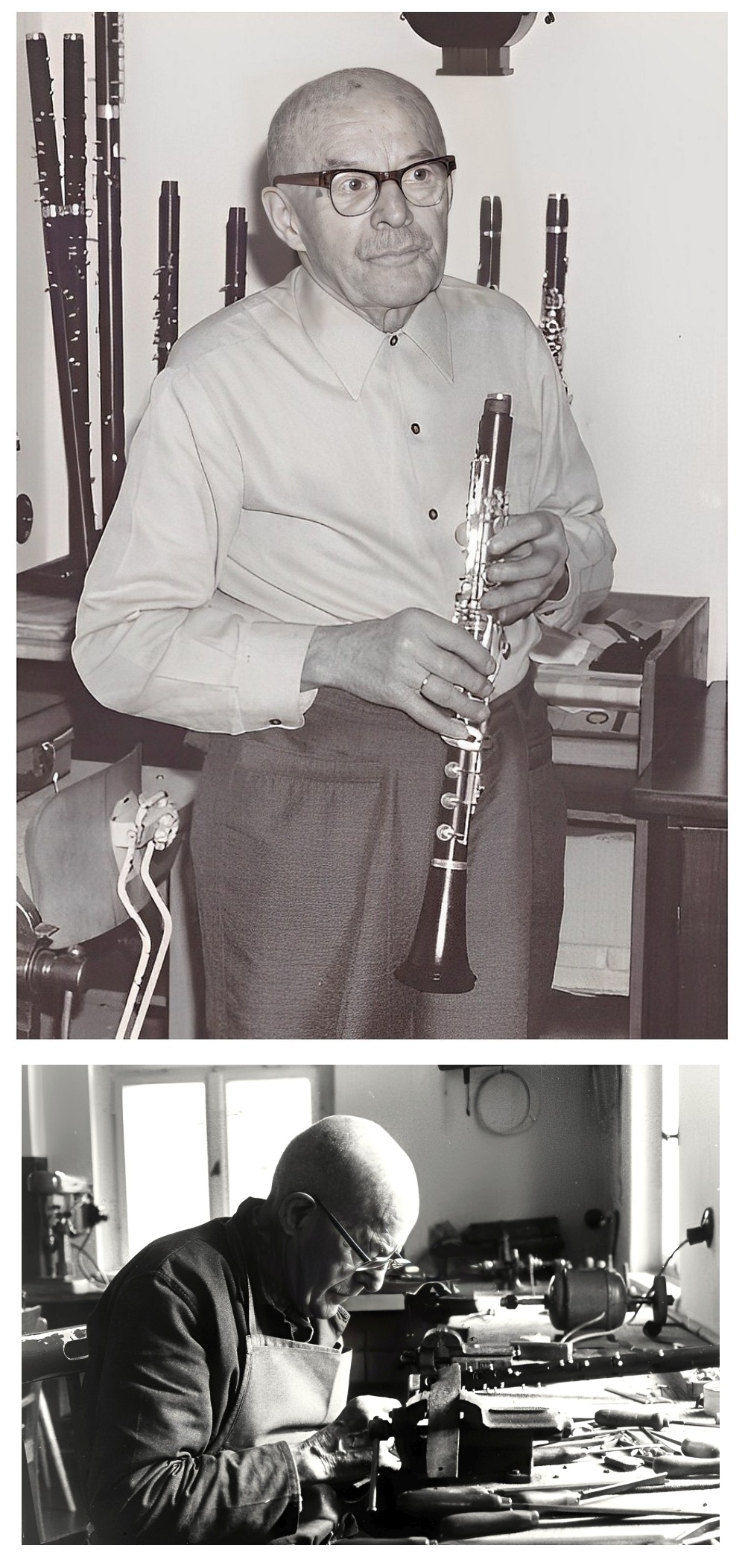
Fritz Wurlitzer in his workshop in the 1970s

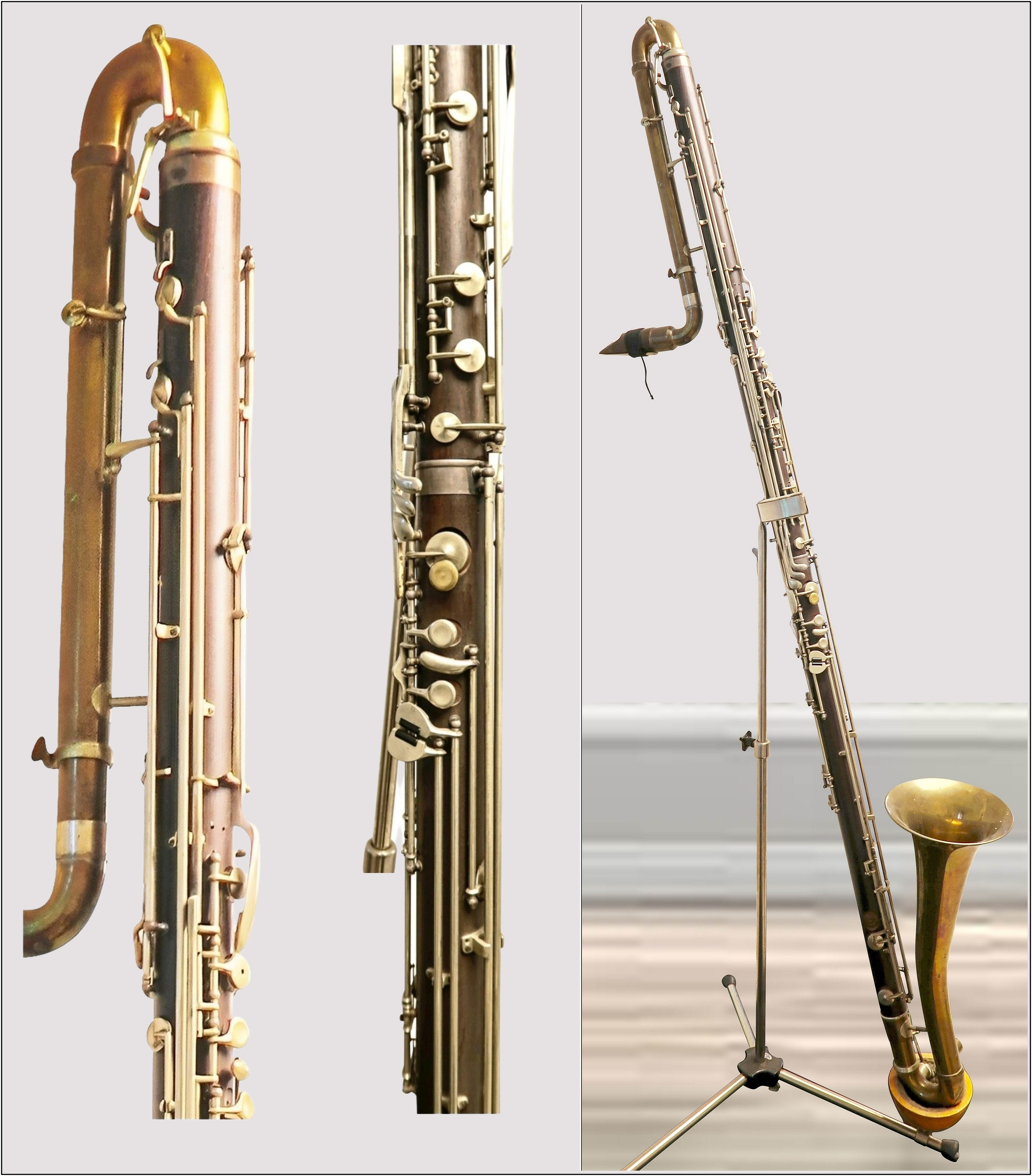
Wurlitzer double bass clarinet

Fritz Ulrich Wurlitzer (21 December 1888 – 5 or 9 April 1984) was a German clarinet maker, based in Erlbach in Vogtland, Saxony. He developed the Reform Boehm clarinet and made improvements to the Schmidt-Kolbe clarinet and the German bass clarinet.

== History ==
Fritz Wurlitzer came from a family that had been active in musical instrument making for generations. His father Paul Oskar Wurlitzer made clarinets and other woodwind instruments in his workshop in Erlbach. At the same time, Fritz Wurlitzer, after years of apprenticeship and travelling, opened his own workshop in 1929, also in Erlbach, for the manufacture of various woodwind instruments. From 1935, after moving into new premises, he successfully concentrated on the construction of clarinets with up to ten employees. A catalogue published in 1956 shows an extensive programme of clarinets of different systems.

In 1946, Wurlitzer joined the Migma Musikinstrumenten-Handwerker-Genossenschaft (Musical Instrument Craftsmen Cooperative), Markneukirchen, from which he left again in 1980 due to his age. In this way, he escaped nationalization. However, the state set the prices for their services and products. In addition, the craftsmen and the other self-employed in the GDR were taxed so heavily that their net income was hardly higher than the general wage level of the working people. The fact that the name and brand and also the level of quality were preserved was due to the craftsmen's ethos of the master craftsmen, who pursued their ideal without any significant economic advantages.

From the beginning of the 1970s, the number of Wurlitzer's journeymen gradually declined until the last employee left in 1976. But even then he continued to work occasionally in his workshop until the age of 90.

== Achievements ==
Fritz Wurlitzer's most important development was the improvement of the German bass clarinet, which was distinguished above all by its precise intonation and sonorous sound and was played in many renowned orchestras. He also made the very rare bass clarinets in A.

In the 1970s, he also developed a contrabass clarinet, of which, only one prototype was built.

Another special achievement is considered to be the production over many years of the Schmidt-Kolbe-clarinet, after the Mannheim clarinettist and inventor of this instrument Ernst Schmidt had fallen out with his clarinet maker Louis Kolbe, Altenburg, in the mid-1930s. Schmidt and Wurlitzer reworked the instrument once more before Wurlitzer began making this type of clarinet in 1937. The production of this clarinet unfortunately also came to an end with the end of his professional career, although this variant of the German system was superior in several respects to the Oehler clarinet and was played by renowned soloists. Today it can only be purchased second-hand.

Fritz Wurlitzer became internationally known through the development of the Reform Boehm clarinet. He drew on the work of Schmidt, a clarinettist who had already switched to the Boehm system in 1895. Schmidt had made changes to the Boehm clarinet according to scientific and mathematical principles, which led to a revised instrument that was distinguished externally by rollers between the two upper keys for the right little finger, but above all by a modified bore with a different sound character, which he called the "Reform Boehm Clarinet". However, this instrument only came onto the market after Fritz Wurlitzer continued Schmidt's work in the second half of the 1940s and modified a Boehm clarinet, while retaining the fingering system, so that its sound largely corresponded to that of the historical and thus also the Oehler clarinet. In 1949 he was able to hand over the first clarinet made in this way to a clarinettist of the Concertgebouw Orchestra in Amsterdam, for which he retained the name Reform-Böhm clarinet.

== Succession ==
His son Herbert Wurlitzer fled with his family to West Germany in 1959, where he established a manufactory to build clarinets of the Oehler system and the Reform-Böhm system, with which he gained a reputation and market leadership in Germany over the years due to the quality of his instruments, and also became known in other countries with his Reform Boehm clarinets. The company, which has been under the management of his son Frank-Ulrich and son-in-law Bernd Wurlitzer since the death of Herbert Wurlitzer's wife Ruth in 2014, established a branch in Markneukirchen with a second production facility after the Peaceful Revolution in 1992, into which Fritz Wurlitzer's former workshop was also integrated.
