= Oehler system =

System of keywork for the clarinet

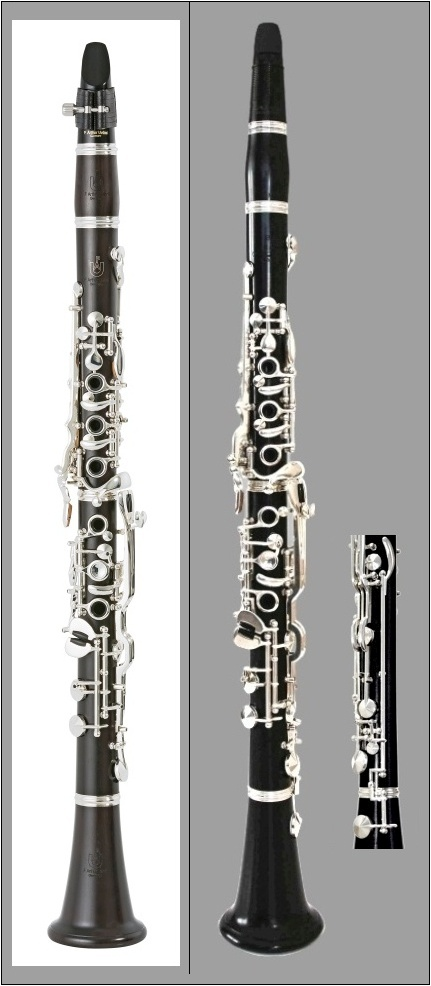
Oehler-system clarinet and Full-Oehler clarinet with bell mechanism to correct low E and F

The Oehler system (also spelled Öhler) is a system for clarinet keys developed by Oskar Oehler. Based on the Müller system clarinet, the system adds tone holes to correct intonation and acoustic deficiencies, notably of the alternately-fingered notes B♭ and F. The system has more keys than the Böhm system, up to 27 in the Voll-Oehler system (full Oehler system). It also has a narrower bore and a longer, narrower mouthpiece leading to a slightly different sound. It is used mostly in Germany and Austria. Major developments include the patent C♯, low E-F correction, fork-F/B♭ correction and fork B♭ correction. Fingering charts can be found for example in this reference.

In the case of finger systems for the clarinet, which are based on the Oehler system, one speaks today mostly of the German system, and of finger systems that are based on the Boehm system (clarinet), of the French system.

== Oehler system clarinet makers ==
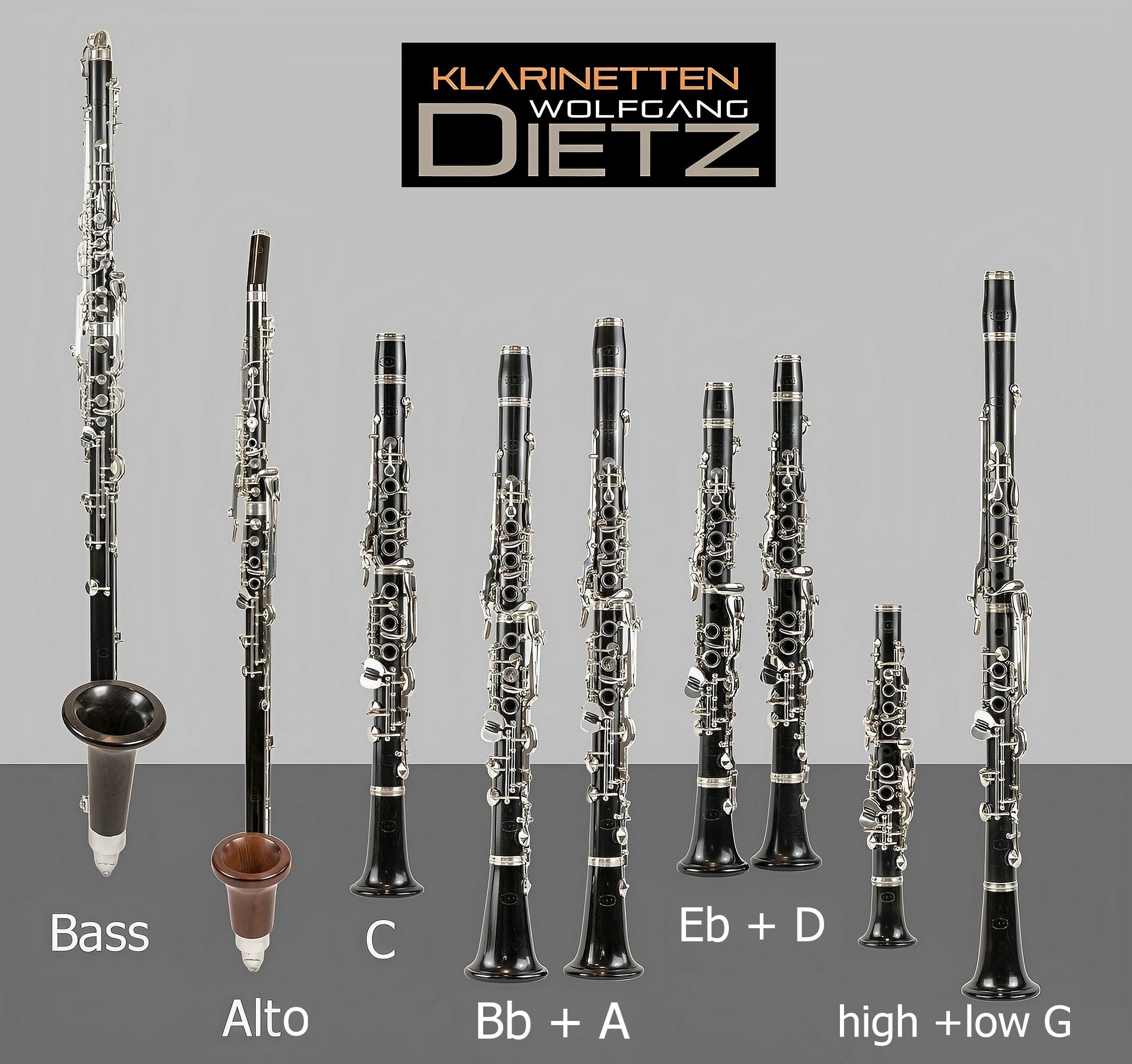
9 clarinets Oehler system

Oskar Oehler had three students: Friedrich Arthur Uebel, Ludwig Warschewski and K.F. Todt. Uebel and Todt are legendary clarinet makers in Germany, while Warschewski moved to Stockholm and became the solo clarinetist of Stockholm Philharmonic. Warschewski bought semi-finished Uebel clarinets and worked on the bore and mechanics. His clarinets are used by famous clarinetists like Dieter Klöcker. Uebel clarinets were used by Karl Leister when he first joined the Berlin Philharmonic; later he changed to Herbert Wurlitzer Clarinets made before the 1970s sounded very much like the Uebel clarinets while the bigger bore gave them better intonation. After the 1970s, Wurlitzer made some modifications to their design. Wurlitzer clarinets are now used in the great majority of German orchestras. They are very expensive, but some Wurlitzer apprentices are producing similar clarinets for less. Other Oehler clarinet manufacturers include Yamaha, Schreiber, Meinel, Schwenk & Seggelke, Dietz Klarinettenbau and F. Arthur Uebel.
