= Markneukirchen =

- Town
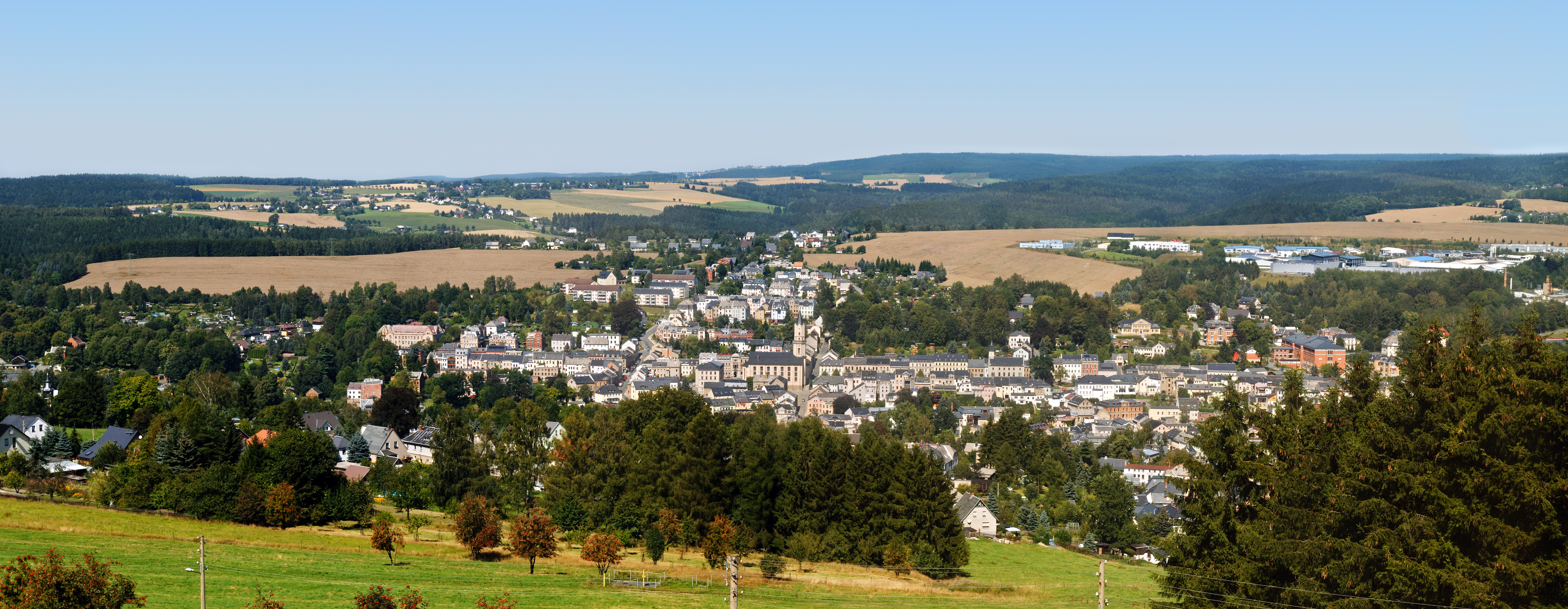

- Coat of arms

- Location of Markneukirchen within Vogtlandkreis district
- Interactive map of Markneukirchen
- Location within Germany Location within Saxony
- Coordinates: 50°19′N 12°19′E
- Country: Germany
- State: Saxony
- District: Vogtlandkreis

Government
  - Mayor (2022–29): Toni Meinel

Area
  - Total: 69.06 km^{2} (26.66 sq mi)
- Elevation: 504 m (1,654 ft)

Population (2025-12-31)
  - Total: 6,951
  - Density: 100.7/km^{2} (260.7/sq mi)
- Time zone: UTC+01:00 (CET)
  - Summer (DST): UTC+02:00 (CEST)
- Postal codes: 08258
- Dialling codes: 037422
- Vehicle registration: V, AE, OVL, PL, RC
- Website: www.markneukirchen.de/

Markneukirchen (German pronunciation: [ˌmaʁk.nɔʏˈkɪʁçn̩]) is a town in the Vogtlandkreis district, in Saxony, Germany, close to the Czech border. It lies in the Elster Mountains (part of the Fichtel Mountains), 24 km (14.9 mi) southeast of Plauen, and 14 km (8.7 mi) northeast of Aš (Czech Republic).

Markneukirchen is the main town of the small musical instrument-making region Musikwinkel, known for four centuries for high quality brass, woodwind and string instruments. Within this small locality, 113 different enterprises are involved in making musical instruments. They rely on traditional methods but sell all over the world.

The town is home to the Museum of Musical Instruments founded in 1883 by Paul Otto Apian-Bennewitz. It hosts an annual International Instrumental Competition and master classes. Since 1993 the competition has been a member of the World Federation of International Music Competitions. Arnold Voigt worked in the town for most of his life.

== History ==
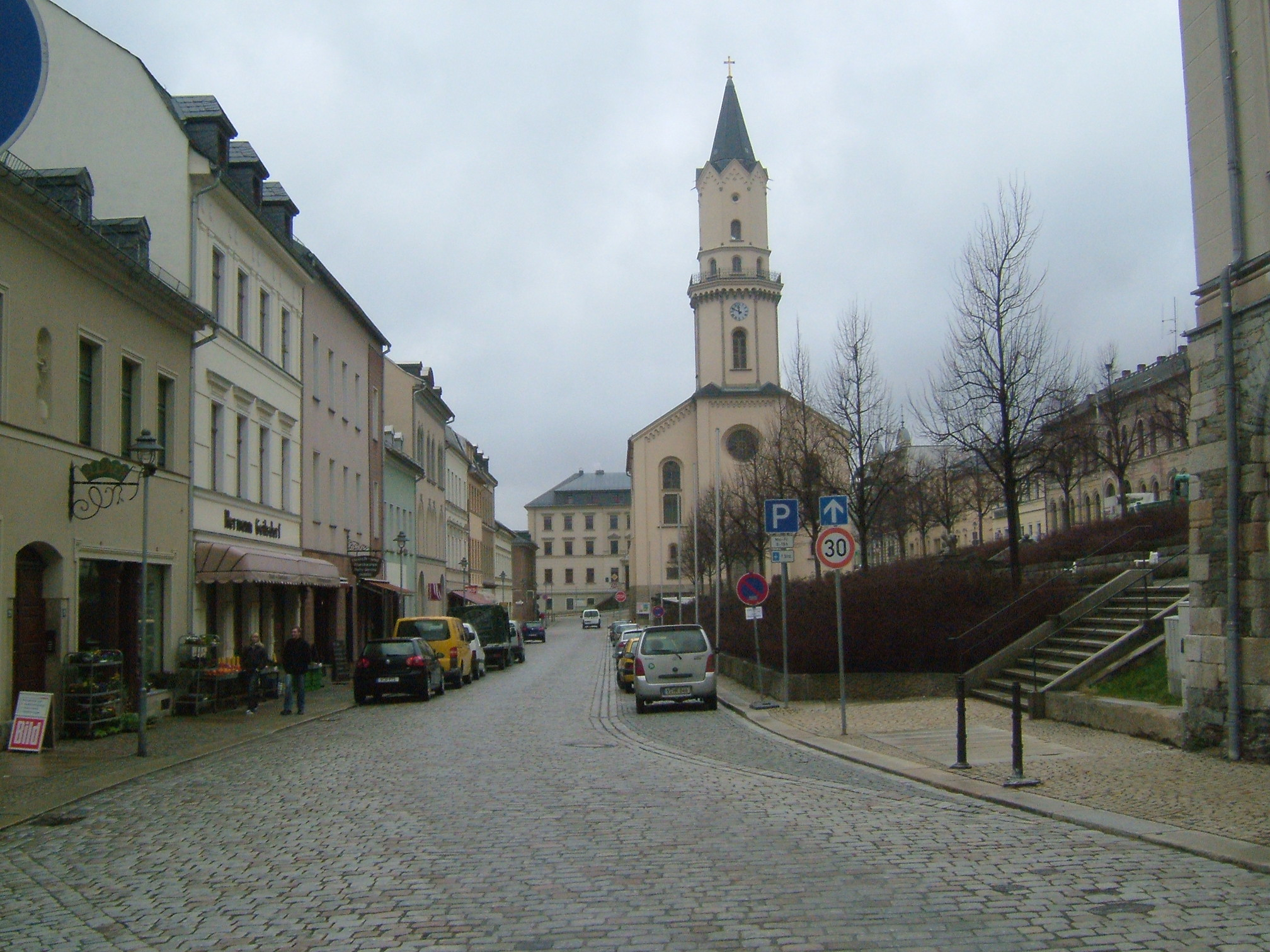
Town center

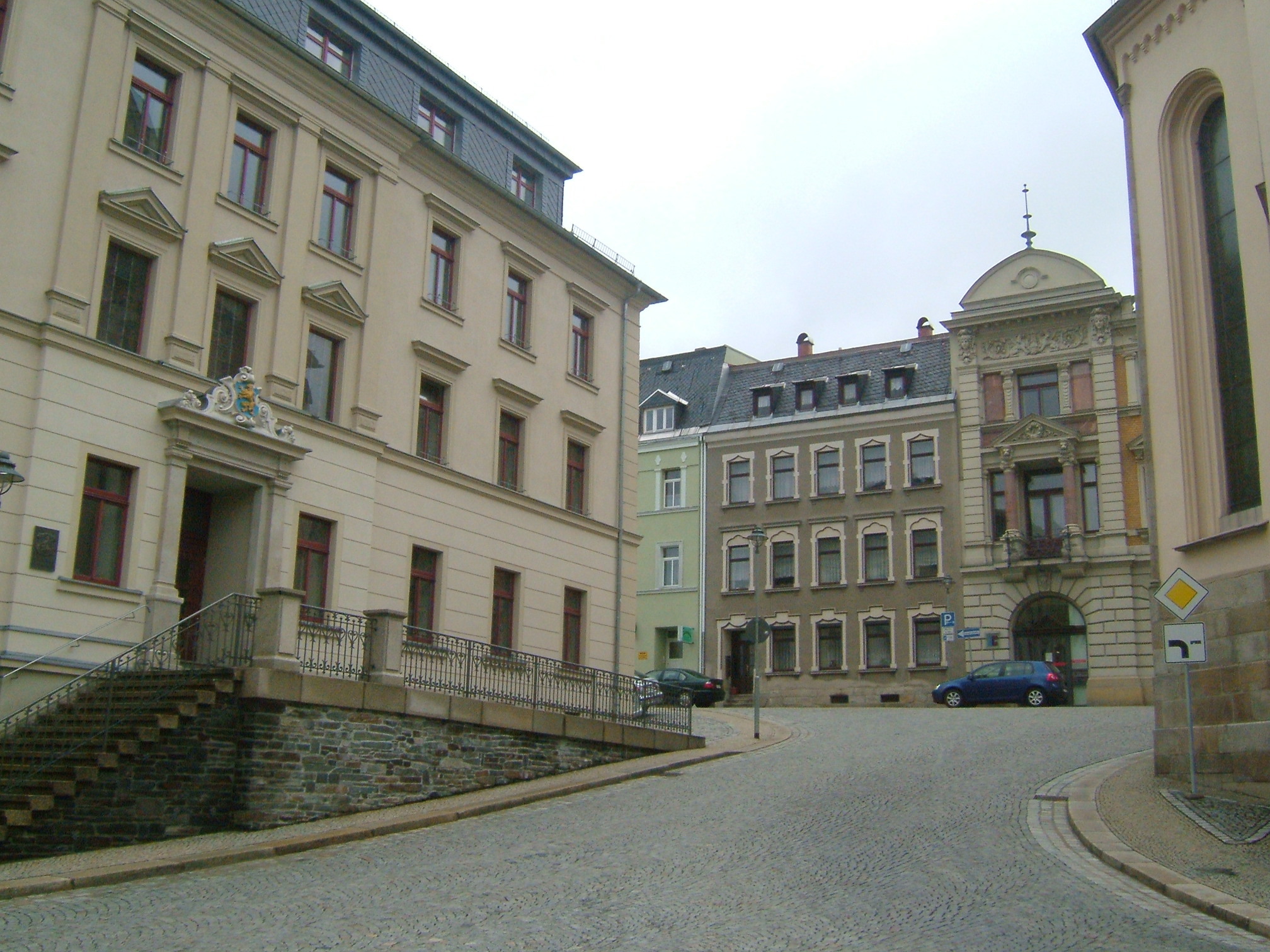
City hall

Nothaft: In the 13th century, the new village was established and took the name of the local Egerland nobility: Albertus Nothaft de Wildstein, who was occupying the area and moving in families from Bayern and Oberpfalz. In a deed from a century later, 1378, it was referred to as Nuwenkirchen dictum Nothaft.

Around 1274 the name was first recorded as Neukirchen (new church). The new church building was mentioned in a deed from Klosters Waldsassen, as Chunradus de Newenkirchen.

In 1357 (Nuenkirchin) and 1360 (stat) the place gained a market with the same rights as the neighbouring towns of Adorf und Oelsnitz. The market was founded by Vögte von Plauen (either Heinrich der Ältere or Heinrich der Lange), who used it to establish a higher place in the pecking order, in their struggle with the Wettiner dynasty.

The town's instrument-making history stems from the 17th century arrival of a group of Protestants fleeing religious persecution across the border in Bohemia. Among them were some who already practised the instrument trade. By the 1900s, 80 percent of the world's musical instruments were made in this small town.

The present spelling Markneukirchen, that is Mark without a t, was fixed in 1858 by royal decree from Dresden, so it would not be confused with other Neukirchens.

Under communist rule, the businesses in the town were reorganised collectively. The state managed trade with the outside world, and decided a production schedule for the instrument makers at the start of each year, rendering it a useful foreign-exchange income.

=== Local government reorganisation ===
In 1994 Wohlhausen and Breitenfeld were subsumed into Markneukirchen (on January and 1 March, respectively), and Landwüst joined in 1999. Erlbach became part of Markneukirchen in 2014.

=== Population ===
- 1796: (251 houses)
- 1801: 1151 (261 houses)
- 1815: 1602
- 1830: 1561
- 1834: 2330
- 1871: 4157
- 1890: 6652
- 1910: 8959
- 1925: 8821
- 1939: 8303
- 1946: 8903
- 1960: 8776
- 1964: 8576
- 1971: 8264
- 2003: 7196
- 2004: 7128

=== Coat of arms ===
The arms share with Plauen und Adorf the motif of the Plauen Vögte, that is a left-facing lion with doubled tail and aggressive tongue.

=== Partner towns ===
- Heusweiler (Saarland)

=== Museums ===
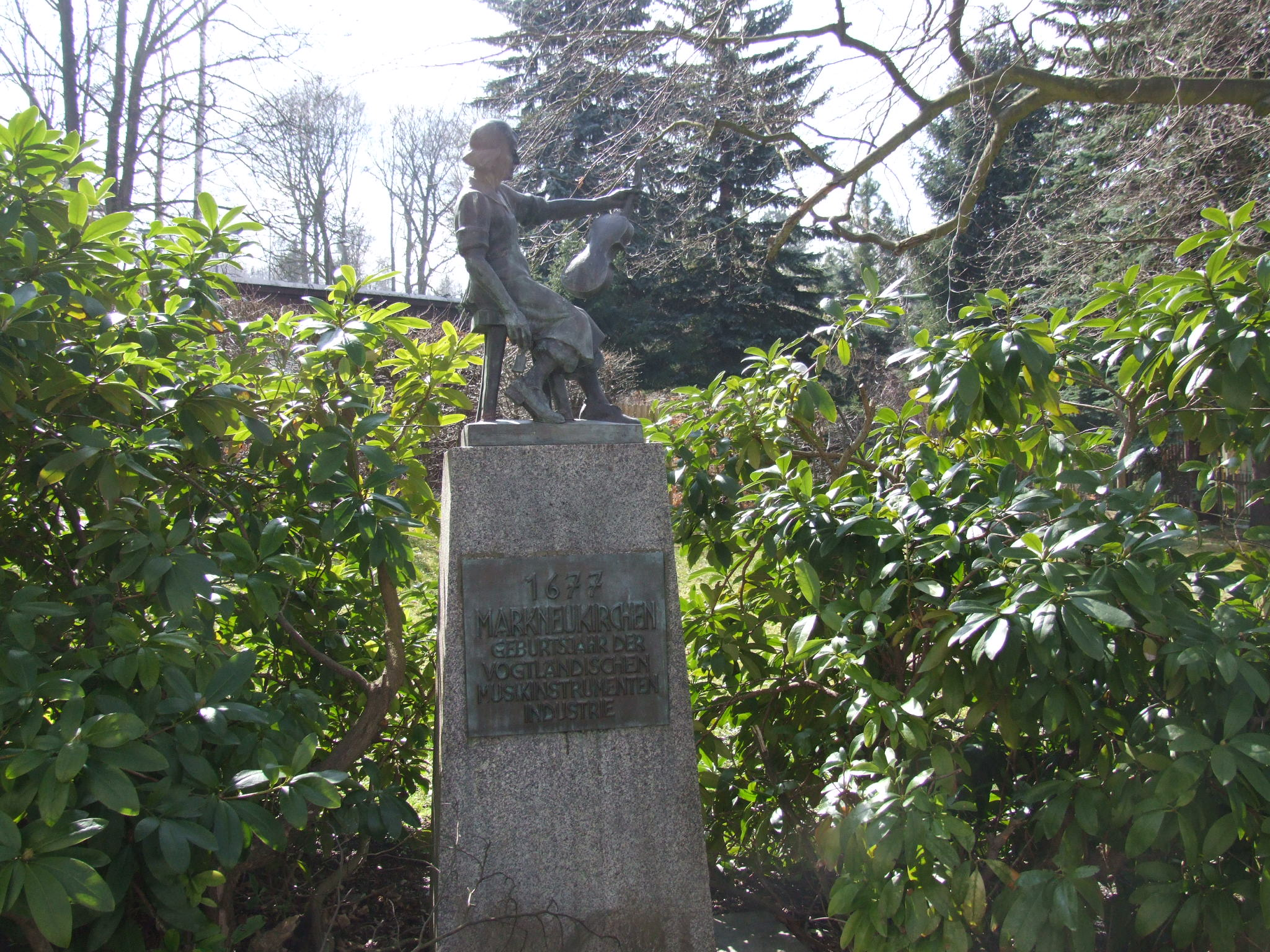
The Musical Instrument Museum, statue in the garden

- The Musical Instrument Museum of Markneukirchen was founded in 1883 by Paul Otto Apian-Bennewitz a teacher and organist. At that time the manufacture of orchestral instruments was expanding due to increased trade with many European countries and with the United States. He envisaged a teaching collection of European and ethnic instruments. The collection now comprises more than 3,100 items from Europe, Asia, Africa, America and Australia. The core collection consists of instruments from the immediate area that document the development of instruments from the 17th century to the present day. In the last 60 years, three million people have visited the museum in the Paulus-Schlösschen, a late baroque town house.

=== Public transport ===
Markneukirchen's first railway station was on the Chemnitz-Aue-Adorf Line near Siebenbrunn. In 1909 the Stichbahn railway from Siebenbrunn to Erlbach opened with a station near the post office and in the town centre. This closed in 1975 and Siebenbrunn on the Vogtlandbahn became the nearest station again.

== Education ==
- The Villa Merz offers a Studiengang Musikinstrumentenbau Markneukirchen validated through the Westsächsischen Hochschule Zwickau (FH) (Fachbereich Angewandte Kunst Schneeberg).
- The Gymnasium Markneukirchen has a strong musical tradition.
- The Musikschule Reinhold Glier offers music course to all- and provides training that leads to membership of the towns numerous ensembles, orchestra and choirs such as the Symphonie, Blasorchester der Stadt, the Handwerkerorchester Migma, the Jugendblas- and Symphonieorchester.

== Notable people ==
- Christian Friedrich Martin (1793–1873), American guitar maker, born and trained in Markneukirchen
- Ernst Heinrich Roth (1877–1948), violin maker

== Literature ==
- Crasselt, Friedrich August: Versuch einer Chronik von Markneukirchen im K. Sächs. Voigtlande. Entworfen von Friedrich August Crasselt, d.Z. Diaconus daselbst, Schneeberg 1821.
- Eichler, Heidrun/Stadtlander, Gert (Red.): Musikinstrumenten-Museum Markneukirchen. Hg. von der Sächsischen Landesstelle für Museumswesen, Berlin/München 2000 (Sächsische Museen, Bd. 9). (ISBN 3-422-03077-8)
- Hellriegel, Franz Wilhelm Rudolf: Chronik von Markneukirchen, Zwickau 1913.
- Erich Wild: Geschichte von Markneukirchen. Stadt und Kirchspiel, Plauen 1925 (Beilageheft zur 34. Jahresschrift 1925 des Vereins für vogtländische Geschichte und Altertumskunde).
- Ernst Heinrich Roth, Geigenbauer. Seine Geigern von 1920 bis 1930 sind besonders weltweit gesucht.
