= 1926 in art =

Events from the year 1926 in art.

== Events ==
- Marcel Duchamp's The Bride Stripped Bare by Her Bachelors, Even is accidentally broken.
- Marjorie Watson-Williams moves to Paris and adopts the name Paule Vézelay.

== Awards ==
- Archibald Prize: W B McInnes – Silk and Lace

== Works ==
- Max Beckmann – Quappi in Blue
- H. Chalton Bradshaw with bronzes by Gilbert Ledward – Guards Memorial, London
- Alexander Calder – Cirque Calder (wire sculpture)
- Alexander Stirling Calder – Shakespeare Memorial, Philadelphia, Pennsylvania
- Salvador Dalí – The Basket of Bread
- Charles T. Diamond with relief by John Paulding – Astoria Victory Monument, Astoria, Oregon
- Edwin Dickinson – The Cello Player
- Max Ernst
  - The Blessed Virgin Chastises the Infant Jesus before Three Witnesses: A.B., P.E. and the Artist
  - The Dove was Right
- Alberto Giacometti – Spoon Woman
- Dora Gordine – Chinese Head (Chia-Chu Chang: The Chinese Philosopher) (bronze)
- Hannah Höch – Love
- Frida Kahlo – Self-portrait in a Velvet Dress
- Ernst Ludwig Kirchner – The Bridge near Wiesen
- René Magritte
  - The Difficult Crossing (first version)
  - The Musings of a Solitary Walker
- Georges Malkine – Nuit d'Amour
- John Marin - Related to Downtown New York, Movement No. 2 (The Black Sun)
- Henri Matisse – Yellow Odalisque (first version)
- Joan Miró – Dog Barking at the Moon
- Haig Patigian – Statue of Abraham Lincoln (bronze, San Francisco)
- Dod Procter – Morning
- John Bulloch Souter – The Breakdown

== Births ==
- 3 January – Felicitas Kuhn, Austrian illustrator (d. 2022)
- 13 January – Craigie Aitchison, Scottish painter (d. 2009)
- 17 January – Robert Filliou, French Fluxus artist (d. 1987)
- 18 January – Roy Kiyooka, Canadian photographer, artist and poet (d. 1994)
- 24 January – Ruth Asawa, American sculptor (d. 2013)
- 1 February – Vivian Maier, American street photographer (d. 2009)
- 6 April – Gil Kane, Latvian-born cartoonist (d. 2000)
- 10 April – Gustav Metzger, German-Jewish born British creator of auto-destructive art and activist (d. 2017)
- 26 April – Michael Mathias Prechtl, German illustrator (d. 2003)
- 25 May – David Wynne, English figure sculpture (d. 2014)
- 6 May – Edward Clark, American abstract expressionist painter (d. 2019)
- 13 June
  - Satoru Abe, American sculptor and painter (d. 2025)
  - George Booth, American cartoonist (d. 2022)
- 9 July - Jaroslav Bejček, Czech painter, graphic artist, sculptor. and illustrator (d. 1986)
- 3 August – David Johnson, American photographer (d. 2024)
- 8 August
  - Arturo García Bustos, Mexican painter (d. 2017)
  - William Foley, American illustrator (d. 2020)
- 14 August – René Goscinny, French comic book author, editor and humorist (d. 1977)
- 10 September – Beryl Cook, English naïve painter (d. 2008)
- 25 September – Sonia Gechtoff, American painter (d. 2018)
- 6 October – Petar Omčikus, Serbian artist (d. 2019)
- 25 October – Ismail Gulgee, Pakistani painter (d. 2007)
- 3 November – Paul Rebeyrolle, French painter (d. 2005)
- 5 November – John Berger, English art critic, novelist and painter (d. 2017)
- 9 November – Raymond Hains, French artist and photographer (d. 2005)
- 10 December – Leon Kossoff, English painter (d. 2019)

== Deaths ==
- January 15 – Eugeniusz Zak, Polish painter (b. 1884)
- February 4 – Adolphe Willette, French illustrator (b. 1857)
- April 1 – Charles Angrand, French neo-Impressionist painter (b. 1854)
- June 14 – Mary Cassatt, American painter (b. 1844)
- July 17 – Maximilian Liebenwein, Austro-German painter and illustrator (b. 1869)
- July 24 – T. C. Steele, American Impressionist painter (b. 1847)
- August 25 – Thomas Moran, American painter of the Hudson River School (b. 1837)
- September 28 – Helen Allingham, English watercolour painter and illustrator (b. 1848)
- October 5 – Dorothy Tennant, English painter (b. 1855)
- October 16 – Ignacy Korwin-Milewski, Polish art collector (b. 1846)
- October 24 – Charles Marion Russell, American "cowboy artist" (b. 1864)
- December 5 – Claude Monet, French Impressionist painter (b. 1840)

== See also ==
- 1926 in fine arts of the Soviet Union
