= Caroline Broadhead =

English artist, jewellery designer and installation artist

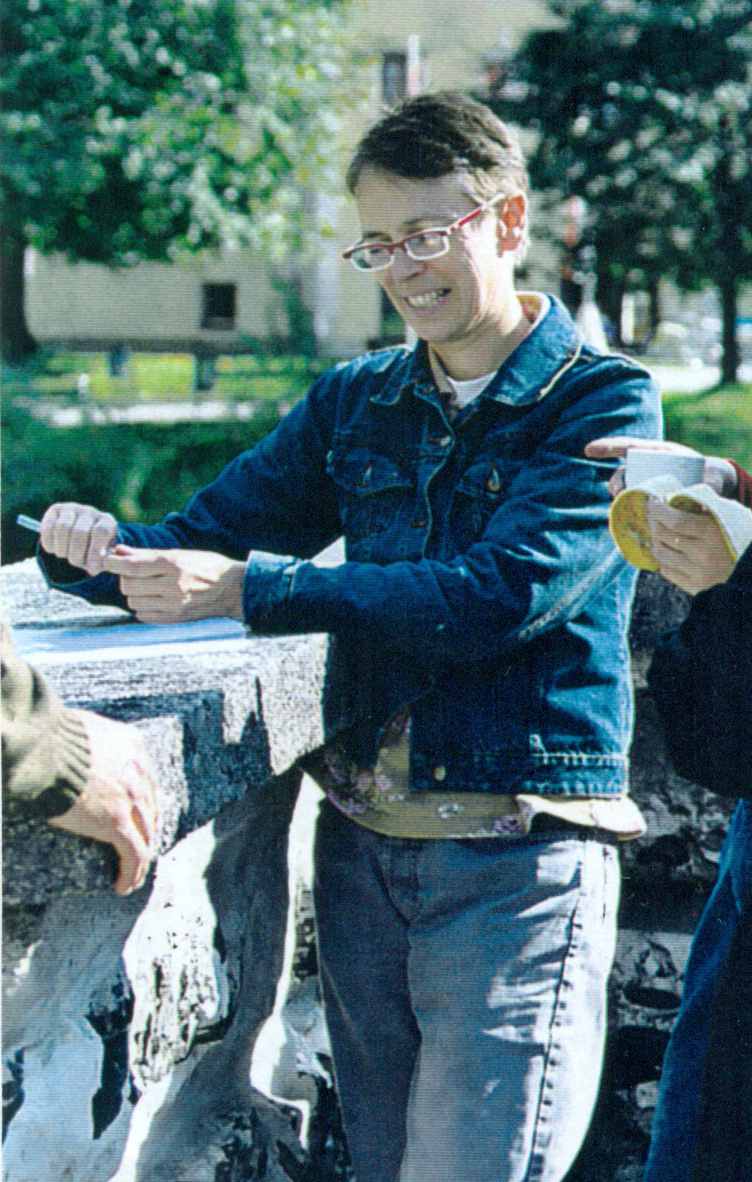
- Broadhead in 2002
- Born: 1950 (age 75–76); Leeds, West Yorkshire, England
- Education: Leicester College of Art; Central School of Art and Design
- Known for: Jewellery, textiles, furniture
- Website: Official website

Caroline Broadhead (born 1950) is an English multidisciplinary artist, jewellery designer and installation artist. Using a diversity of materials to create art pieces such as jewellery, textiles and furniture, she explores the "interface between a person and an object, the sense of touch, movement and change." She joined the Jewellery Design programme at Central Saint Martins in 2009 and became Programme Director of Jewellery and Textiles in 2012. She retired from teaching in 2018.

== Early life ==
Born in Leeds in 1950, Broadhead completed a foundation course at Leicester College of Art in 1969 and a Diploma in Jewellery Design in 1972 at Central School of Art and Design. Her first experience making jewellery was in a ceramics class at school.

== Career ==
After finishing university in 1972, Broadhead shared a workshop space in Covent Garden with two former classmates. She began teaching part-time at Middlesex University to support herself financially so she could focus on freely creating. She also launched a jewellery line, C&N, with Nuala Jamison. Broadhead started out designing unusual jewellery but, while in Amsterdam on a Crafts Council bursary, made her first garment, a top with extremely long sleeves, in 1982. She developed an interest in "things that come into contact with or represent the body: shadows, clothing, [and] chairs" and expanded her exhibition types to include large-scale installations. She has worked with choreographers such as Rosemary Lee to capture movement and fluidity in her artwork. In 2007, she was an artist-in-residence at Pilchuck Glass School and became the lead of the BA Jewellery Design course at Central Saint Martins in 2009 and the Programme Director of Jewellery and Textiles in 2012. She retired from teaching in 2018.

In 2012, she and her daughter Maisie recreated classic paintings in a collection called Taking the Chair, which featured Broadhead's chairs.

Broadhead's work has been displayed in a range of galleries, museums, and other venues, including Bath Abbey, Arnolfini, The Hepworth Wakefield, National Gallery of Victoria, Stedelijk Museum, National Museum of Modern Art, Kyoto, Victoria and Albert Museum, Museum of Arts and Design, Institute of Contemporary Arts, Painted Bride Art Center, Middlesbrough Institute of Modern Art, CODA Museum and the Marsden Woo Gallery. In 2019, she held a retrospective exhibition at Lethaby Gallery, which showcased work she created from the 1970s to 2017. In 2023, she curated the Schmuck exhibition at the International Crafts Fair during Munich Jewellery Week.

== Selected exhibitions ==
- 1997: The Waiting Game at Upnor Castle with Angela Woodhouse
- 2005: Breathing Space at St Mary's Church
- 2006: Proposal for Space at the Victoria and Albert Museum
- 2007: Interrupted Gaze at Barrett Marsden Gallery
- 2014/2015: Finding at Foundling Museum
- 2015: Second Hand, First Hand at Marsden Woo Gallery with Maria Militsi
- 2019: ReFrame at Manchester Art Gallery with Maisie Broadbent
- 2023: Pearls at Atta Gallery with Saint Martens colleagues Lin Cheung, Melanie Georgacopoulos, Maria Militsi and Frances Wadsworth Jones

== Awards ==
- 1973: Crafts Council Grant to Craftsmen award
- 1997: Jerwood Prize for Applied Arts: Textiles
- 2004: Textiles International Open
- 2017: Goldsmiths' Craft & Design Council Lifetime Achievement Award

== Personal life ==
Broadhead has twin daughters, Maisie and Zoë, who are an artist and a nurse, respectively. Her great-uncle was John Bulloch Souter, painter of The Breakdown.
