= Hot fountain pen =

Small single-reed woodwind instrument

Woodwind instrument
- Classification: Aerophone; Single-reed
- Hornbostel–Sachs classification: 422.211.2 (Single reed with cylindrical bore and fingerholes)
- Developed: 1920s

Related instruments
- chalumeau; xaphoon; octave clarinet

Musicians
- Adrian Rollini; Laurie Payne

Builders
- Keith Prowse & Co.

The hot fountain pen, or red-hot fountain pen, is a small keyless single-reed woodwind instrument similar to a xaphoon, popularised in the 1920s and 30s by the jazz saxophonist Adrian Rollini. It was first introduced by the saxophonist Jimmy Dorsey in his jazz band The California Ramblers in the mid-1920s, where Rollini, a fellow band member, encountered and adopted it. Rollini, who introduced several other instruments to jazz including the bass saxophone, couesnophone ("goofus"), and vibraphone, named it from his friendship with Neil Waterman, a musician from the wealthy New York family that owned the Waterman Pen Company.

The instrument Rollini performed on was pitched in E♭ and about 27 centimetres (10½ inches) in length. He made at least two models for sale, in original E♭ and a slightly larger model in C. These were made in ebonite by the London instrument manufacturer Keith, Prowse & Co. and first advertised c. 1928 in Melody Maker, a British weekly music magazine.

Only a small number of instruments were made up until the mid-20th century, featuring mainly on recordings by Rollini and the jazz violinist Joe Venuti. Its only other significant proponent was the English musician Laurie Payne. In museums, one instrument survives in the Bate Collection of Musical Instruments at the University of Oxford.

== Bibliography ==
- van Delden, Ate (2020). Adrian Rollini: The Life and Music of a Jazz Rambler. Jackson: University Press of Mississippi. ISBN 978-1-4968-2515-5. LCCN 2019021692. OCLC 1126216273. Wikidata Q130746122.
