= Greg Kelsey =

Actors and entertainer

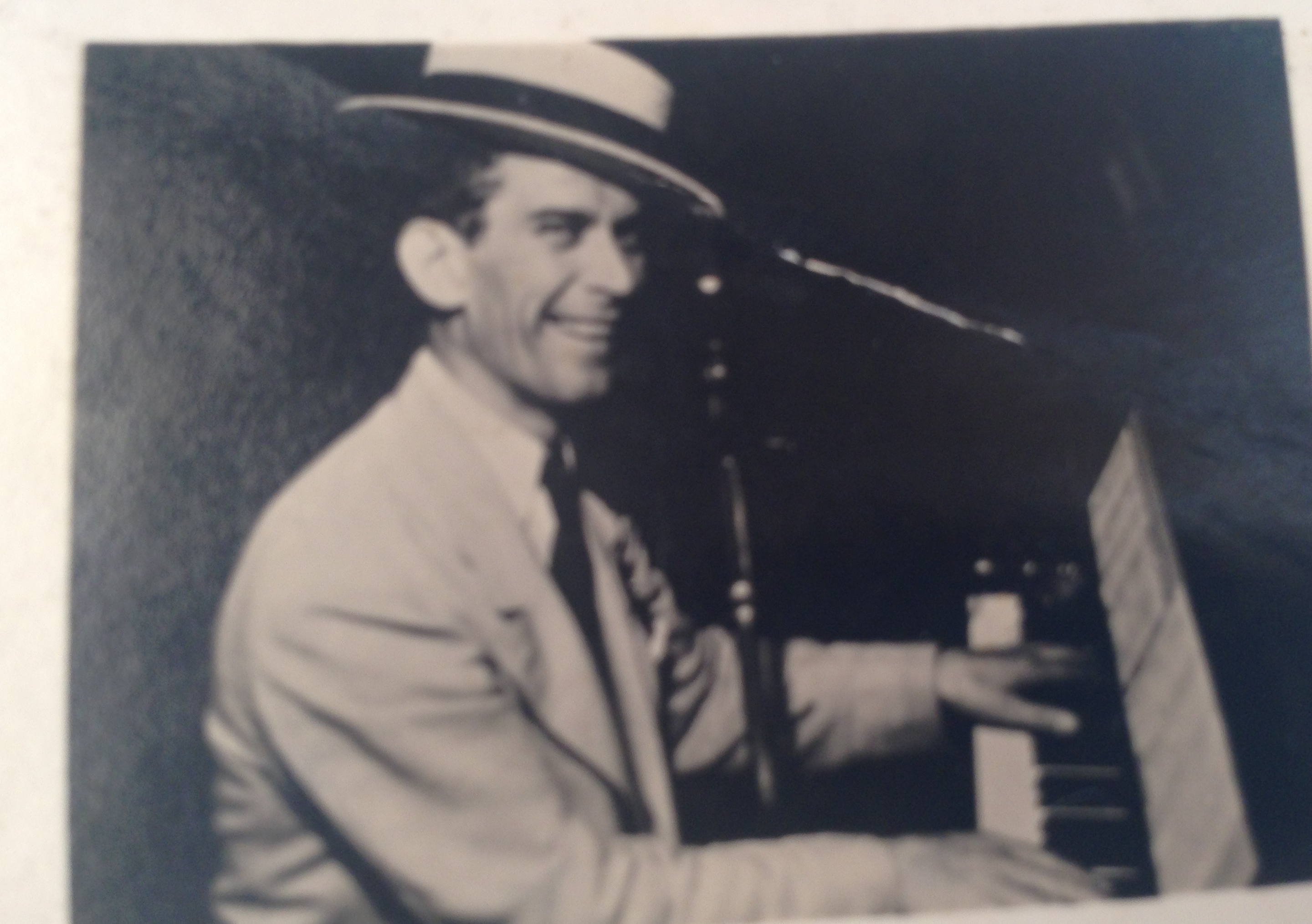
Kelsey in New York in the 1930s.

William Gregory Kelsall (1893–1967), known by the stage name Greg Kelsey, was an English born actor and entertainer who gained fame in the US in the 1930s and 1940s.

== Early life and education ==
William Gregory Kelsall, known to family and friends as "Greg," was born in Stoke-on-Trent on 6 January 1893. He was the eldest son of William Kelsall (b. 1870) and Emma Kelsall (née Bowcock, b. 1867). His father William Kelsall was a professional vocalist and was subsequently to emigrate to Canada and New York to become an actor, taking the name of William Calvert.

Greg was educated at St. Mary's Catholic Primary School in Leek, Staffordshire and took his first turn at acting under the tutelage of the nuns at the school. His first job after leaving school was as a potters warehouse assistant and he lived at 70 Lime Street Stoke-on-Trent.

He married May Harper in 1913, shortly before emigrating on his own to Canada.

== Career ==
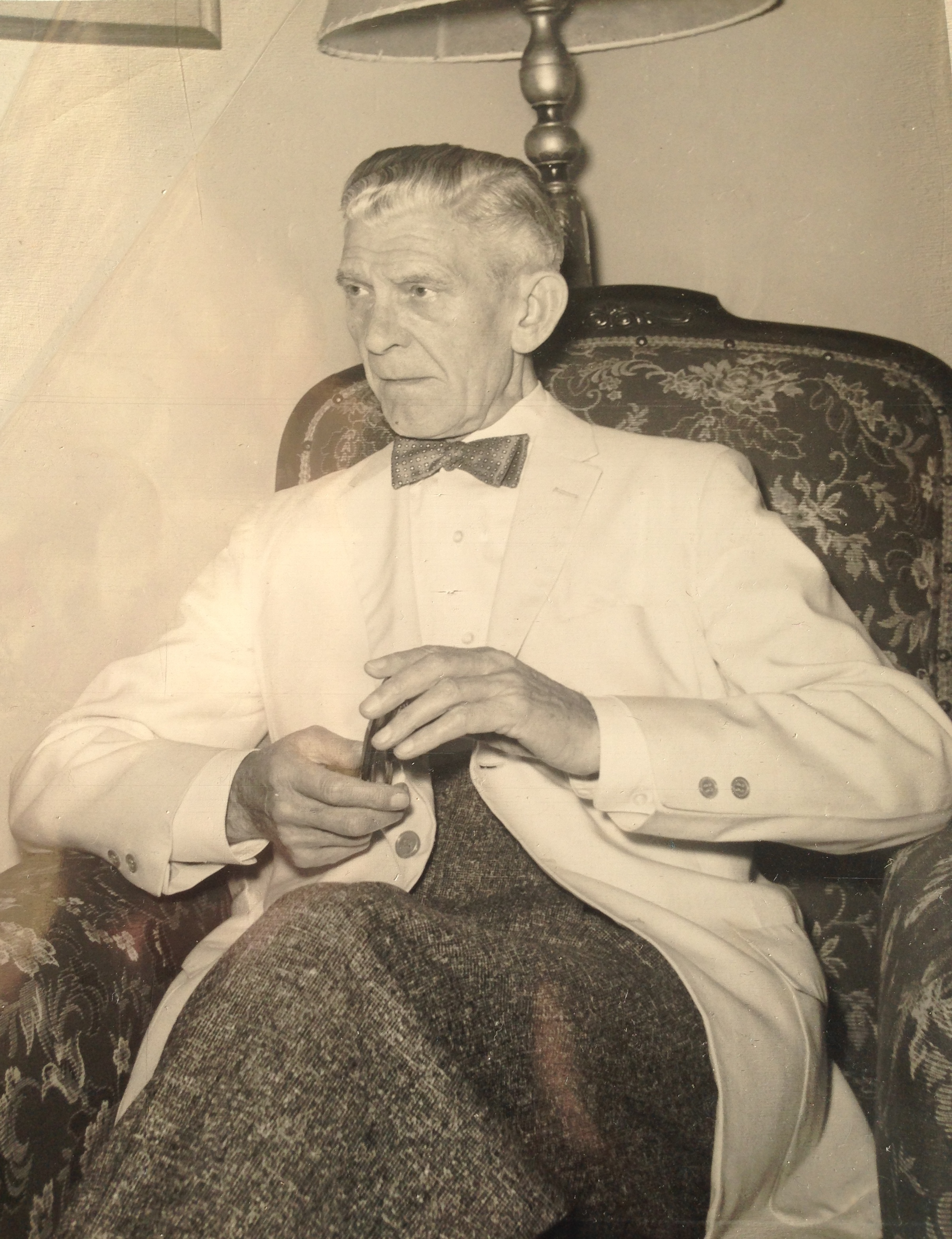
Kelsey in the 1950s

Kelsall departed for North America from Liverpool on 8 May 1913 aboard "the Corsican" steamship, aged only 20 years. His occupation was listed as "labourer". The ship was bound for Montréal in Québec.

After working initially in manual labour, Kelsall was introduced through his father to Mr Henry Duffy, one of America's leading producers, whose company he joined at Montréal. He was then trained under Henry Dixey, a famous international comedian of the American stage. Around this time, he began to be known by his pseudonym "Greg Kelsey". After that he went into partnership, with his act being known as O'Neill and Kelsey. He left Canada in April 1925 via Niagara Falls with his wife and two children, destined for the New York Stage.

Upon arrival in New York in 1925, Kelsey received an offer came from Shubert Theatre (New York City) and as a result he signed a contract to play in the noted musical Blossom Time opposite Eugene Leontivich wife of Gregory Ratoff, the Metro Goldwyn Mayer Director.

Kelsey hit hard times during the Great Depression in the early 1930s. He was affected, as were many others, by the closure of a number of the Broadway shows. He was reputed to be working as a singing waiter in 1932 and was living away from home which was then at City Island, Bronx. As USA recovered under President Franklin D. Roosevelt Kelsey returned to the Broadway stage. Between 1934 and 1946 he entertained President Roosevelt, broadcast with Bing Crosby and the Easy Access and made pictures in Hollywood. He was by this point under the management of Charles Colligan, patron of the Barclay Club of Barnstable, Massachusetts.

Kelsey was called up to serve in the US Army in 1942 in World War II. His theatrical skills were put to good use as he received seven citations from the American Congress for work during the War. He appeared in special shows with such people as Bob Hope, Una Plokin, sisters Vaughan-de-Leith and other prominent stars of the day.

After the war he performed in the long-running stage hit "The Gay Nineties" which became one of the early television shows The Gay Nineties Revue.

During his career, Kelsey cultivated friendships with world renowned personalities on the screen including Jimmy Durante, Peter Lorre, Fred Allen, Jim Lurle Junior (star of the 1940s radio show "Can you Top this?"), Jack Whiting, William Cargan, Eddie Dowling and Harry Donnelly (writer of the song "Hink-a-dink-a-do", Jimmy Durante's theme song).

He returned to England in 1945 and then in 1947 to visit family and to explore various offers in the nascent television industry. It is not clear whether he took up any of these offers. The last remaining record of his work was the publication of a play called "Check your Hat" in 1951.

== Death ==
Kelsey died on 2 July 1967 at Memorial Hospital, New York. He is buried in Holy Cross Cemetery North Arlington.

== Legacy ==
Kelsey's daughter Ena Kelsall married prominent Big Band jazz musician Arthur Rollini, brother of Adrian Rollini.
