= Jazz Age =

American period in the 1920s and 1930s

- 1920s–1930s
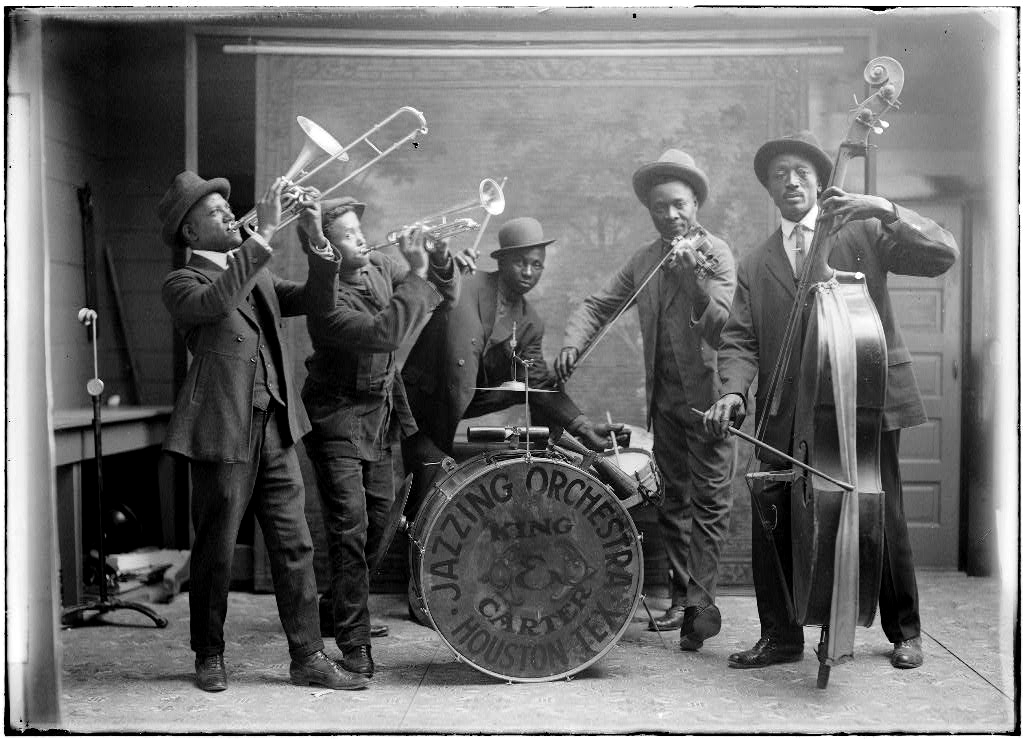
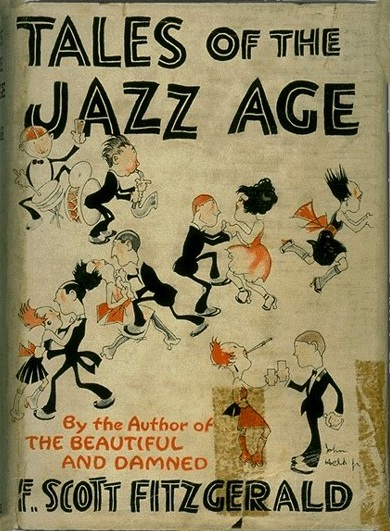
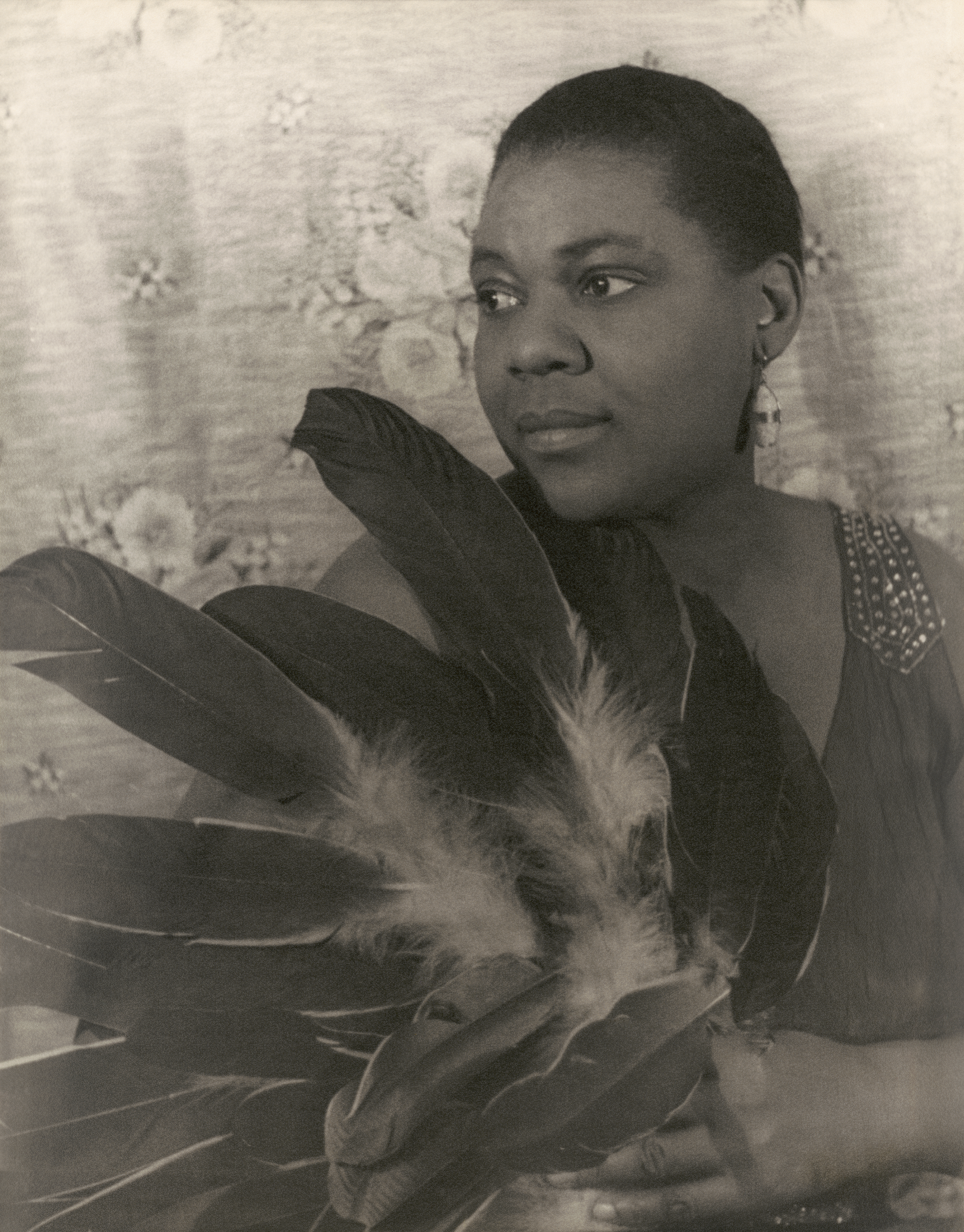
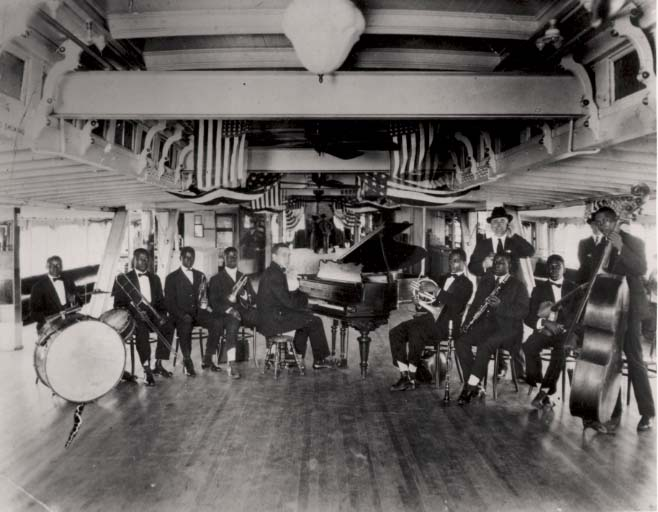
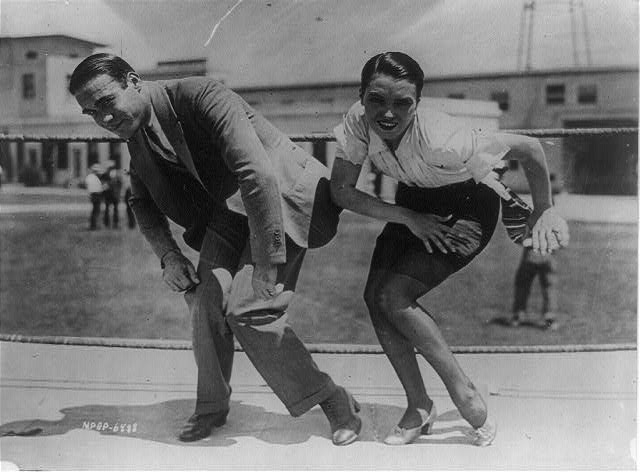
- Clockwise from top: King & Carter Jazzing Orchestra (1921); Bessie Smith (1936); Dancing the Charleston (1925); Fate Marable's New Orleans Band (c. 1918); Tales of the Jazz Age (1922)
- Location: United States
- Including: Roaring Twenties; Prohibition era; Great Depression

The Jazz Age was a period from 1920 to the early 1930s in which jazz music and dance styles gained worldwide popularity. The Jazz Age's cultural repercussions were primarily felt in the United States, the birthplace of jazz. Originating in New Orleans as mainly sourced from the culture of African Americans, jazz played a significant part in wider cultural changes in this period, and its influence on popular culture continued long afterwards.

The Jazz Age is often referred to in conjunction with the Roaring Twenties, and overlapped in significant cross-cultural ways with the Prohibition era. The movement was largely affected by the introduction of radios nationwide. During this time, the Jazz Age was intertwined with the developing youth culture. The movement would also help in introducing jazz culture to Europe. The Jazz Age ends before the Swing era.

== Background ==
The term jazz age was in popular usage prior to 1920. In 1922, American writer F. Scott Fitzgerald further popularized the term with the publication of his short story collection Tales of the Jazz Age.

=== Jazz music ===
Jazz is a music genre that originated in the Black-American communities of New Orleans, Louisiana, in the late 19th and early 20th centuries, and developed from roots in blues and ragtime. New Orleans provided a cultural humus in which jazz could germinate because it was a port city with many cultures and beliefs intertwined. In New Orleans, people of different cultures and races often lived close together which allowed for cultural interaction which facilitated the development of the active musical environment of the city. In New Orleans, the development of jazz was influenced by Creole music, ragtime, and blues.

Jazz is seen by many as "America's classical music". The earliest Jazz styles, which emerged in New Orleans, Chicago, and New York in the early 1920s, are sometimes referred to as "dixieland jazz". In the 1920s, jazz became recognized as a major form of musical expression. It then emerged in the form of independent traditional and popular musical styles, all linked by the common bonds of Black-American and European-American musical parentage with a performance orientation. From African traditions, jazz derived its rhythm, "blues", and traditions of playing or singing in one's own expressive way. From European traditions, jazz derived its harmony and instruments.

Louis Armstrong brought the improvisational solo to the forefront of a piece, replacing the original polyphonic ensemble style of New Orleans jazz. Jazz is generally characterized by swing and blue notes, call and response vocals, polyrhythms and improvisation.

=== Prohibition ===
Prohibition in the United States was a nationwide constitutional ban on the production, importation, transportation, and sale of alcoholic beverages from 1920 to 1933. In the 1920s, the laws were widely disregarded, and tax revenues were lost. Well-organized criminal gangs took control of the beer and liquor supply for many cities, unleashing a crime wave that shocked the U.S. This prohibition was taken advantage of by gangsters such as Al Capone, and approximately $60 million (equivalent to $1,343.75 million in 2025) in illegal alcohol was smuggled across the borders of Canada and the United States. The resulting illicit speakeasies that grew from this era became lively venues of the "Jazz Age", hosting popular music that included current dance songs, novelty songs and show tunes.

By the late 1920s, a new opposition mobilized across the U.S. Anti-prohibitionists, or "wets", attacked prohibition as causing crime, lowering local revenues, and imposing rural Protestant religious values on urban America. Prohibition ended with the ratification of the Twenty-first Amendment, which repealed the Eighteenth Amendment on December 5, 1933. Some states continued statewide prohibition, marking one of the latter stages of the Progressive Era.

=== Speakeasies ===
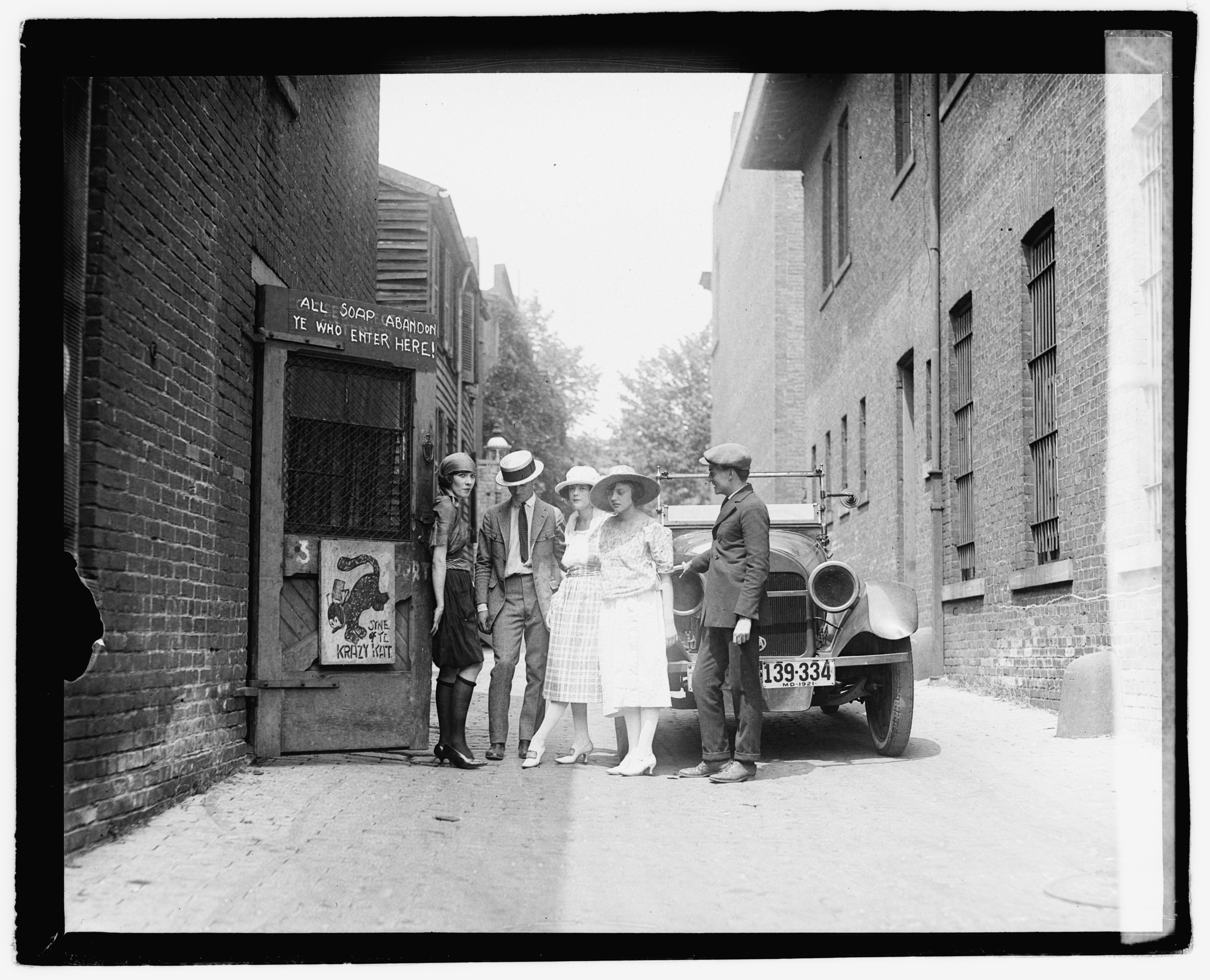
Several patrons and a flapper await the opening of the Krazy Kat Klub in 1921, a speakeasy located in Washington, D.C.

Formed as a result of the eighteenth amendment, speakeasies were places (often owned by organized criminals) where customers could drink alcohol and relax or speakeasy. Jazz was played in these speakeasies as a countercultural type of music to fit in with the illicit environment and events going on. Jazz artists were therefore hired to play at speakeasies. Al Capone, the famous organized crime leader, gave jazz musicians previously living in poverty a steady and professional income. Thaddeus Russell, in A Renegade History of the United States, states: "The singer Ethel Waters fondly recalled that Capone treated her 'with respect, applause, deference, and paid in full.'" Also from A Renegade History of the United States, "The pianist Earl Hines remembered that 'Scarface [Al Capone] got along well with musicians. He liked to come into a club with his henchmen and have the band play his requests. He was very free with $100 tips." The illegal culture of speakeasies led to what was known as 'black and tan' clubs which had multiracial crowds.

There were many speakeasies, especially in Chicago and New York City. New York City had, at the height of Prohibition, 32,000 speakeasies. At speakeasies, both payoffs and mechanisms for hiding alcohol were used. Charlie Burns, in recalling his ownership of several speakeasies employed these strategies as a way to preserve his and Jack Kriendler's illegal clubs. This includes forming relationships with local police. Mechanisms that a trusted engineer created include one that when a button was pushed, tongue blocks under shelves of liquor would drop, making the shelves drop back and liquor bottles fall down a chute, break, and drain the alcohol through rocks and sand. An alarm also went off if the button was pushed to alert customers of a raid. Another mechanism used by Burns was a wine cellar with a thick door flush with the wall. It had a small, almost unnoticeable hole for a rod to be pushed in to activate a lock and open the door.

=== Rum running/bootlegging ===
As to where speakeasies obtained alcohol, there were rum runners and bootleggers. Rum running, in this case, was the organized smuggling of liquor by land or sea into the U.S. Decent foreign liquor was high-end alcohol during prohibition, and William McCoy had some of the best of it. Bill McCoy was in the rum-running business, and at certain points of time was ranked among the best. To avoid being caught, he sold liquor just outside the territorial waters of the United States. Buyers would come to him to pick up his booze as a precaution for McCoy. McCoy's liquor specialty was selling high-quality whiskey without diluting the alcohol. Bootlegging was making and or smuggling alcohol around the U.S. As selling the alcohol could make plenty of money, there are several major ways this was done. One strategy used by Frankie Yale and the Genna brothers gang (both involved in organized crime) was to give poor Italian Americans alcohol stills to make alcohol for them at $15 per day's work. Another strategy was to buy liquor from rumrunners. Racketeers would also buy closed breweries and distilleries and hire former employees to make alcohol. Johnny Torrio partnered with two other mobsters and legitimate brewer Joseph Stenson to make illegal beer in a total of nine breweries. Finally, some racketeers stole industrial grain alcohol and redistilled it to sell in speakeasies.

== History ==
From 1919, Kid Ory's Original Creole Jazz Band of musicians from New Orleans played in San Francisco and Los Angeles, where in 1922 they became the first black jazz band of New Orleans origin to make recordings. The year also saw the first recording by Bessie Smith, the most famous of the 1920s blues singers. Chicago, meanwhile, was the main center developing the new "Hot Jazz", where King Oliver joined Bill Johnson. Bix Beiderbecke formed The Wolverines in 1924.

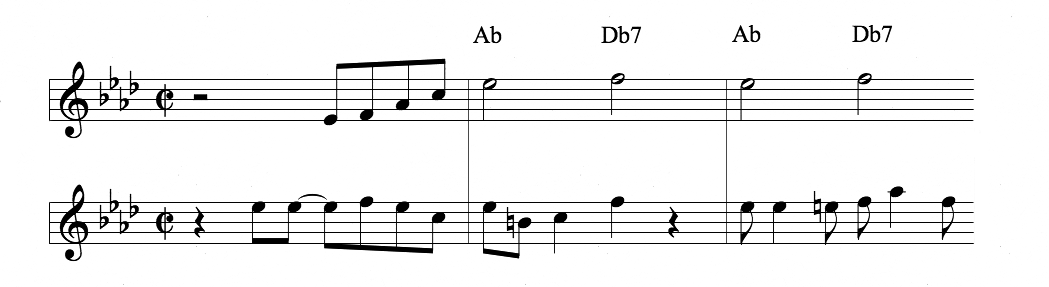
Top: excerpt from the straight melody of "Mandy, Make Up Your Mind" by George W. Meyer & Arthur Johnston. Bottom: corresponding solo excerpt by Louis Armstrong (1924).

The same year, Louis Armstrong joined the Fletcher Henderson dance band as featured soloist, leaving in 1925. The original New Orleans style was polyphonic, with theme variation and simultaneous collective improvisation. Armstrong was a master of his hometown style, but by the time he joined Henderson's band, he was already a trailblazer in a new phase of jazz, with its emphasis on arrangements and soloists. Armstrong's solos went well beyond the theme-improvisation concept, and extemporized on chords, rather than melodies. According to Schuller, by comparison, the solos by Armstrong's bandmates (including a young Coleman Hawkins), sounded "stiff, stodgy," with "jerky rhythms and a grey undistinguished tone quality." The following example shows a short excerpt of the straight melody of "Mandy, Make Up Your Mind" by George W. Meyer and Arthur Johnston (top), compared with Armstrong's solo improvisations (below) (recorded 1924). (The example approximates Armstrong's solo, as it does not convey his use of swing.)

Armstrong's solos were a significant factor in making jazz a true 20th-century language. After leaving Henderson's group, Armstrong formed his virtuosic Hot Five band, which included instrumentalist's Kid Ory (trombone), Johnny Dodds (clarinet), Johnny St. Cyr (banjo), and wife Lil on piano, where he popularized scat singing.

"Rhapsody in Blue"
The United States Marine Band's 2018 performance of George Gershwin's "Rhapsody in Blue". F. Scott Fitzgerald asserted that the song idealized the youthful zeitgeist of the Jazz Age.

Jelly Roll Morton recorded with the New Orleans Rhythm Kings in an early mixed-race collaboration, then in 1926 formed his Red Hot Peppers. There was a larger market for jazzy dance music played by white orchestras, such as Jean Goldkette's orchestra and Paul Whiteman's orchestra. In 1924, Whiteman commissioned Gershwin's Rhapsody in Blue, premiered by Whiteman's Orchestra. Writer F. Scott Fitzgerald opined that Rhapsody in Blue idealized the youthful zeitgeist of the Jazz Age. By the mid-1920s, Whiteman was the most popular bandleader in the U.S. His success was based on a "rhetoric of domestication" according to which he had elevated and rendered valuable a previously inchoate kind of music. Other influential large ensembles included Fletcher Henderson's band, Duke Ellington's band (which opened an influential residency at the Cotton Club in 1927) in New York, and Earl Hines' Band in Chicago (who opened in The Grand Terrace Cafe there in 1928). All significantly influenced the development of big band-style swing jazz. By 1930, the New Orleans-style ensemble was a relic, and jazz belonged to the world.

Several musicians grew up in musical families, where a family member would often teach how to read and play music. Included in this group was the bandleader Guy Lombardo, who collaborated with his brothers Carmen and Lebert in Canada to form the Royal Canadians Orchestra in the early 1920s. By 1929 their "sweet" big band appeared regularly at the landmark Roosevelt Hotel in New York City and later in 1959 at the Waldorf-Astoria Hotel, where they entertained audiences nationwide for decades with a velvety-smooth interpretation of the "sweetest music this side of heaven". Despite Benny Goodman's claim that "sweet" music was a "weak sister" as compared to the "real music" of America, Lombardo's band enjoyed widespread popularity which crossed racial divides and was even praised by Louis Armstrong as one of his favorites.

Some musicians, like Pops Foster, learned on homemade instruments.

Urban radio stations played African-American jazz more frequently than suburban stations, due to the concentration of African Americans in urban areas such as New York and Chicago. Younger demographics popularized the black-originated dances such as the Charleston as part of the immense cultural shift the popularity of jazz music generated.

Jazz aimed to cultivate empathy by initially challenging established norms and those who adhered to them, before captivating them with its ethereal and enchanting allure. It sought to blur the societal divides of race, class, and political allegiance, as illustrated in James Baldwin's renowned short story, "Sonny's Blues," where the transformative power of jazz unites two estranged brothers through the deeply emotive melodies played by Sonny. In Fitzgerald's works and beyond, jazz acted as a leveling influence, fostering a degree of equality within both literature and society.

In 1925, The Great Gatsby epitomized this phase of Fitzgerald's career, capturing the romanticism and superficial charm of the "Jazz Age." This era started with the conclusion of World War I, the onset of women's suffrage, and Prohibition, and ultimately crumbled with the Great Crash of 1929.

=== Swing in the 1930s ===
The 1930s belonged to popular swing big bands, in which some virtuoso soloists became as famous as the band leaders. Key figures in developing the "big" jazz band included bandleaders and arrangers Count Basie, Cab Calloway, Jimmy and Tommy Dorsey, Duke Ellington, Benny Goodman, Fletcher Henderson, Earl Hines, Harry James, Jimmie Lunceford, Glenn Miller and Artie Shaw. Although it was a collective sound, swing also offered individual musicians a chance to "solo" and improvise melodic, thematic solos which could at times be complex "important" music.

Over time, social strictures regarding racial segregation began to relax in America: white bandleaders began to recruit black musicians and black bandleaders recruit white ones. In the mid-1930s, Benny Goodman hired pianist Teddy Wilson, vibraphonist Lionel Hampton and guitarist Charlie Christian to join small groups. In the 1930s, Kansas City Jazz as exemplified by tenor saxophonist Lester Young marked the transition from big bands to the bebop influence of the 1940s. An early 1940s style known as "jumping the blues" or jump blues used small combos, uptempo music and blues chord progressions, drawing on boogie-woogie from the 1930s.

== Radio ==
The introduction of large-scale radio broadcasts enabled the rapid national spread of jazz in 1932. The radio was described as the "sound factory." Radio made it possible for millions to hear music for free — especially people who never attended expensive, distant big city clubs. These broadcasts originated from clubs in leading centers such as New York, Chicago, Kansas City, and Los Angeles. There were two categories of live music on the radio: concert music and big band dance music. The concert music was known as "potter palm" and was concert music by amateurs, usually volunteers. Big band dance music is played by professionals and was featured in remote broadcasts from nightclubs, dance halls, and ballrooms.

Musicologist Charles Hamm described three types of jazz music at the time: black music for black audiences, black music for white audiences, and white music for white audiences. Jazz artists like Louis Armstrong originally received very little airtime because most stations preferred to play the music of white American jazz singers. Other jazz vocalists include Bessie Smith and Florence Mills. In urban areas, such as Chicago and New York, African-American jazz was played on the radio more often than in the suburbs. Big-band jazz, like that of James Reese Europe and Fletcher Henderson in New York, attracted large radio audiences.

Several "sweet jazz" dance orchestras also achieved national recognition in big band remote broadcasts including: Guy Lombardo's Royal Canadian Orchestra, at New York City's Roosevelt Hotel (1929) and at the Waldorf-Astoria Hotel (1959), and Shep Fields's Rippling Rhythm Orchestra at Chicago's landmark Palmer House Hotel (1936), New York City's "Star-light Roof" in the Waldorf-Astoria Hotel (1937), and the Copacabana nightclub.

== Elements and influences ==
=== Youth ===
Young people in the 1920s used the influence of jazz to rebel against the traditional culture of previous generations. This youth rebellion of the 1920s included such things as flapper fashions, women who smoked cigarettes in public, a willingness to talk about sex freely, and radio concerts. Dances like the Charleston, developed by African Americans, suddenly became popular among the youth. Traditionalists were aghast at what they considered the breakdown of morality. Some urban middle-class African Americans perceived jazz as "devil's music", and believed the improvised rhythms and sounds were promoting promiscuity.

Jazz served as a platform for rebellion on multiple fronts. In dance halls, jazz clubs, and speakeasies, women found refuge from societal norms that confined them to conventional roles. These spaces offered them more freedom in their speech, attire, and behavior. Reflecting the prevalent Freudian psychology of the 1920s, jazz promoted "childlike" behavior, with frequenters known as Flappers often called "Jazz Babies." The uninhibited and spontaneous nature of jazz encouraged primal and sensual expression. As the older generation dismissed jazz, it became a vehicle for young women (and men) to challenge the values of their parents and grandparents.

=== Role of women ===
With women's suffrage—the right for women to vote—at its peak with the ratification of the Nineteenth Amendment on August 18, 1920, and the entrance of the free-spirited flapper, women began to take on a larger role in society and culture. With women now taking part in the work force after the end of the First World War there were now many more possibilities for women in terms of social life and entertainment. Ideas such as equality and open sexuality were very popular during the time and women seemed to capitalize on these ideas during this period. The 1920s saw the emergence of many famous women musicians, including Bessie Smith. Bessie Smith gained attention because she was not only a great singer but also an African-American woman as well as an icon in the LGBTQ+ community. Throughout her musical career she was unapologetically herself, expressing the struggles of the Black working class, addressing issues such as poverty, racism, and sexism alongside themes of love and female sexuality in her lyrics. She has grown through the ages to be one of the most well respected singers of all time and inspired later performers such as Billie Holiday.

Lovie Austin (1887–1972) was a Chicago-based bandleader, session musician (piano), composer, singer, and arranger during the 1920s classic blues era. She and Lil Hardin Armstrong often are ranked as two of the best female jazz blues piano players of the period.

Piano player Lil Hardin Armstrong was originally a member of King Oliver's band with Louis, and went on to play piano in her husband's band the Hot Five and then his next group called the Hot Seven. It was not until the 1930s and 1940s that many women jazz singers, such as Bessie Smith and Billie Holiday, were recognized as successful artists in the music world. Another famous female vocalist who attained stardom at the tail-end of the Jazz Age was Ella Fitzgerald, one of the more popular female jazz singers in the United States for more than half a century and later dubbed "The First Lady of Song". She worked with all the jazz greats of the era, including Chick Webb, Duke Ellington, Count Basie, and Benny Goodman. These women were persistent in striving to make their names known in the music industry and to lead the way for many more women artists to come.

=== Influence of middle-class white Americans ===
The birth of jazz is credited to African Americans. But it was modified to become socially acceptable to middle-class white Americans. Those critical of jazz saw it as music from people with no training or skill. White performers were used as a vehicle for the popularization of jazz music in America. Although jazz was taken over by the white middle-class population, it facilitated the mesh of African American traditions and ideals with white middle-class society.

=== Beginnings of European jazz ===
By the 1920s jazz had spread around the world. According to The New York Times in 1922:

Jazz latitude is marked as indelibly on the globe as the heavy line of the equator. It runs from Broadway along Main Street to San Francisco: to the Hawaiian Islands, which it has lyricized to fame; to Japan, where it is hurriedly adopted as some new Western culture; to the Philippines, where it is royally welcomed back as its own; to China where the mandarins and even the coolies look upon it as a helpful sign that the Occident at last knows what is music; to Siam, where the barbaric tunes strike a kindred note and come home to roost; to India, where the natives receive it dubiously, while the colonists seize upon it avidly; to the East Indies, where it holds sway in its elementary form — ragtime; to Egypt, where it sounds so curiously familiar and where it has set Cairo dance mad; to Palestine, where it is looked upon as an inevitable and necessary evil along with liberation; across the Mediterranean, where all ships and all shores have been inoculated with the germ; to Monte Carlo and the Riviera, where the jazz idea has been adopted as its own enfant-chéri; to Paris, which has its special versions of jazz; to London, which long has sworn to shake off the fever, but still is jazzing; and back again to Tinpan Alley, where each day, nay, each hour, adds some new inspiration that will slowly but surely meander along jazz latitude.

As only a limited number of American jazz records were released in Europe, European jazz traces many of its roots to American artists such as James Reese Europe, Paul Whiteman, Mike Danzi and Lonnie Johnson, who visited Europe during and after World War I. It was their live performances which inspired European audiences' interest in jazz, as well as the interest in all things American (and therefore exotic) which accompanied the economic and political woes of Europe during this time. The beginnings of a distinct European style of jazz began to emerge in this interwar period.

British jazz began with a tour by the Original Dixieland Jazz Band in 1919. In 1926, Fred Elizalde and His Cambridge Undergraduates began broadcasting on the BBC. Thereafter jazz became an important element in many leading dance orchestras, and jazz instrumentalists became numerous. Very soon, the resulting music craze in the United Kingdom led to a moral panic in which the threat of jazz to society was exemplified by Scottish artist John Bulloch Souter's controversial 1926 painting The Breakdown. The painting has been described as embodying the fears of Western civilization towards jazz music, and the painting was later destroyed by its author to placate critics who insisted the work should be burned.

The European style of jazz entered full swing in France with the Quintette du Hot Club de France, which began in 1934. Much of this French jazz was a combination of African-American jazz and the symphonic styles in which French musicians were well-trained; in this, it is easy to see the inspiration taken from Paul Whiteman since his style was also a fusion of the two. Belgian guitarist Django Reinhardt popularized gypsy jazz, a mix of 1930s American swing, French dance hall "musette", and Eastern European folk with a languid, seductive feel; the main instruments were steel-stringed guitar, violin, and double bass. Solos pass from one player to another as guitar and bass form the rhythm section. Some researchers believe Eddie Lang and Joe Venuti pioneered the guitar-violin partnership characteristic of the genre which was brought to France after they had been heard live or on Okeh Records in the late 1920s.

=== South African jazz ===
After the discovery of natural resources which boosted the country's economy during the late 19th century and early 20th century, South Africa became urbanised rapidly after its formation in 1910 with Black people leaving their native rural villages to go and work in the city/town in order to earn an income.

Due to discriminative laws that forbade black people from living in the suburbs and owning property, most of them ended up living in slums which became townships. In these slums, shebeens were opened by black women with the purpose of selling home-made, Traditional African beer (locally known as 'Umqombothi') in order to earn an income.

Eventually, these shebeens would provide a nightlife for black people who were living in these slums. During this period in the early 20th century, American jazz was introduced on South African radios, and it became the most popular style of music in the urban areas of South Africa. The biggest consumer of jazz music was the newly black urban class in these shebeens based on the slums of South Africa. Therefore, jazz got fused with African Traditional Music and a new style/genre was formed called Marabi.

In the 1940s, the genre had taken the country by storm, and by the 1950s, another style of South African jazz was formed called Kwela with an addition of the modern or traditional pennywhistle. South African jazz has created many stars of which some became famous worldwide e.g. Miriam Makeba, Hugh Masekela.

== Criticism of the movement ==
During this period, jazz began to get a reputation as being immoral, and many members of the older generations saw it as threatening the old cultural values and promoting the new decadent values of the Roaring Twenties. Professor Henry van Dyke of Princeton University wrote: "[I]t is not music at all. It's merely an irritation of the nerves of hearing, a sensual teasing of the strings of physical passion." The media also spoke ill of it. The New York Times in the 1920s intimated that jazz was responsible for the decline of Western civilization and of the quality of Italian tenors, a poor trade balance with Hungary, a classical musician's fatal heart attack, and frightening bears in Siberia.

=== Classical music ===
As jazz flourished, American elites who preferred classical music sought to expand the listenership of their favored genre, hoping that jazz would not become mainstream. Conversely, jazz became an influence on composers as diverse as George Gershwin and Herbert Howells.
