= Arthur Rollini =

American jazz musician

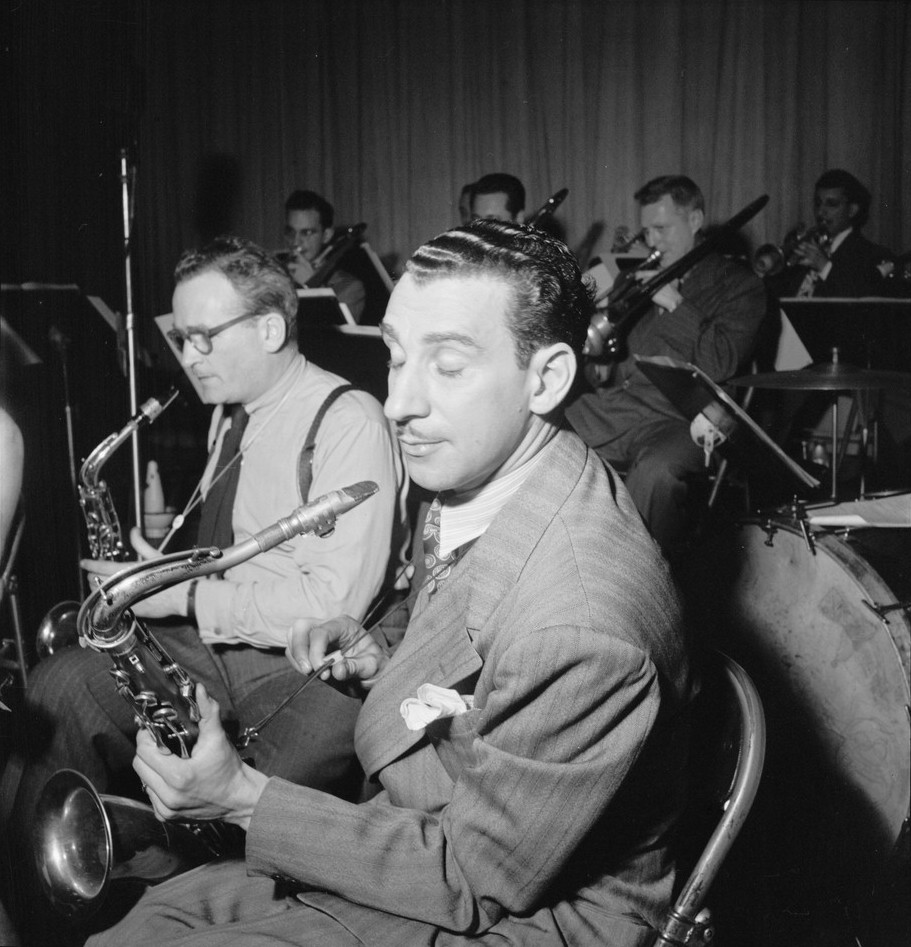
Arthur Rollini (foreground), Sidney Stoneburn and Vernon Brown, c. 1947

Arthur Francis Rollini (February 13, 1912 – December 30, 1993) was an American jazz musician who played the tenor saxophone, flute and clarinet. His nickname was "Schneeze".

== Early life ==
Born in New York City, Rollini came from an Italian descent musical family and grew up in Larchmont, New York. Multi-instrumentalist Adrian Rollini was his older brother.

== Career ==
In 1929, Rollini played in England for Fred Elizalde and worked for the California Ramblers and big band pioneer Paul Whiteman.

From 1934 to 1939, he was a member of the Benny Goodman Orchestra. The highlight of that period was a breakout performance for big band jazz at Carnegie Hall in 1938. He worked with Richard Himber and from 1941–1942 with Will Bradley. From 1943 to 1958, he worked as a studio musician for the American Broadcasting Company.

Rollini's work can be found on recordings with the bands of Wingy Manone, Adrian Rollini (1933–34), Benny Goodman, Joe Venuti (1935), Lionel Hampton (1937), Harry James (1938), Louis Armstrong (1945) and Brad Gowans (1946). In 1939, he starred in an Allstar band of Goodman, Bunny Berigan and Jack Teagarden with ("Blue Lu").

In 1987, Rollini published his autobiography Thirty Years with the Big Bands.

== Personal life ==
Rollini met Ena Kelsall, daughter of actor and entertainer Greg Kelsey, in 1932. They married on November 25, 1935. They had a daughter Adrienne in 1938 and a son Arthur Jr. in 1941.

== Sources ==
- Bohländer, Carlo; Holler, Karl Heinz; Pfarr, Christian (2000). Reclams Jazzführer. Reclam. ISBN 978-3-15-010464-4.
- Feather, Leonard; Gitler, Ira (November 18, 1999). The Biographical Encyclopedia of Jazz. Oxford University Press, USA. ISBN 978-0-19-972907-4.
- Rollini, Arthur (November 1, 1995). Thirty Years with the Big Bands. A&C Black. ISBN 978-1-871478-40-2.
