= Adrian Rollini =

American jazz multi-instrumentalist (1903–1956)

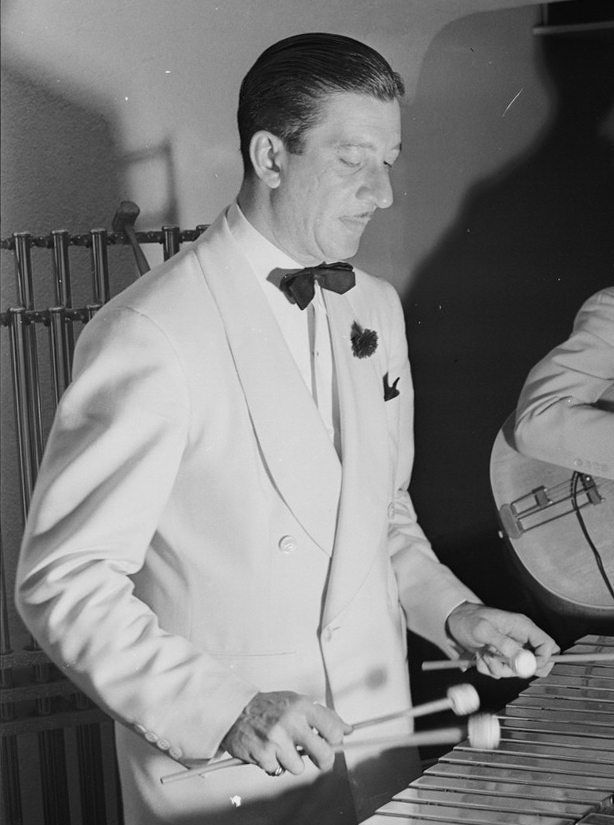

Background information
- Born: Adrian Francis Rollini; June 28, 1903; New York City, U.S.
- Died: May 15, 1956 (aged 52) Homestead, Florida, U.S.
- Genre: Jazz
- Occupation: Musician
- Instruments: Vibraphone; bass saxophone; piano
- Years active: 1922–1955

Adrian Francis Rollini (June 28, 1903 – May 15, 1956) was an American jazz multi-instrumentalist who primarily played the bass saxophone, piano, and vibraphone. He is also known for playing novelty instruments such as the couesnophone (or goofus*), a free-reed instrument resembling a saxophone, and the hot fountain pen, a sort of keyless miniature clarinet.

As a leader, his major recordings included "You've Got Everything" (1933), "Savage Serenade" (1933) and "Got The Jitters" (1934) "A Thousand Good Nights" (1934) on Vocalion, "Davenport Blues", "Nothing But Notes", "Tap Room Swing", "Jitters", "Riverboat Shuffle" (1934) on Decca, and "Small Fry" (1938) on Columbia.

== Early life ==
Adrian Rollini was born in New York City on June 28 1903. Some sources will date 1904, but his brother Arthur Rollini, as well as Social Security Administration records, cite the earlier year. Of French and Swiss extraction, Ferdinand and Adele (née Augenti) Rollini, the original family name had been changed to "Rollini" by his grandfather, after a move to Italy during one of Europe's many wars. Arthur Rollini played tenor saxophone with Benny Goodman from 1934 to 1939 (and later with Will Bradley). Growing up in Larchmont, New York, Adrian showed musical ability early on and began to take piano lessons at the age of two. Considered a child prodigy, he played a fifteen-minute recital at the Waldorf Astoria Hotel at the age of four. Rollini continued with music and, by age 14, he was leading his group composed of neighborhood boys, in which he doubled on piano and xylophone.

Rollini left high school in his third year. He cut piano rolls for the Aeolian company on their Mel-O-Dee label and the Republic brand in Philadelphia. When he was 16, he joined Arthur Hand's California Ramblers. Rollini was equally skilled at piano, drums, xylophone, and bass saxophone, which gained him the respect of Hand, who transferred the band to Rollini when he later retired from the music field. According to his brother Arthur, Adrian mastered the bass saxophone in a matter of weeks.

== Career ==
In 1921 banjoist Ray Kitchenman formed the California Ramblers. Rollini, together with Red Nichols, Jimmy Dorsey, Tommy Dorsey, was one of the most important members of the band. The Ramblers were one of the most prolific recording groups in the 1920s and recorded under different aliases. So we find Rollini with many other groups – The Little Ramblers (starting in 1924), The Goofus Five (most prominently 1926–27), The Golden Gate Orchestra. During his work with these groups he developed his distinctive style of saxophone playing. Rollini's swing and impetus are quite evident; "Clementine (From New Orleans)", "Vo-Do-Do-De-O Blues", and "And Then I Forget" are among some of the best recordings that not only typify the era but showcase the prominence and power that Rollini brought to the table. During this time, he managed to lay down hundreds of sessions with names like Annette Hanshaw, Cliff Edwards (Ukulele Ike), Joe Venuti, Miff Mole, and Red Nichols to name a few. Some of his best work appears on the sides he cut with Bix Beiderbecke (scattered throughout the 1920s, Rollini's great bass sax solos were on scores of records, and were usually outstanding). He also recorded and worked with Roger Wolfe Kahn, Frank Trumbauer, and Red Nichols.

In 1927 he participate in numerous recording sessions and also gained the job of heading up the talent roster for the opening of the Club New Yorker. It was a short-lived organization, a Who's-Who of 1920s jazz, including Bix Beiderbecke, Eddie Lang, Joe Venuti, Frank Signorelli and Frankie Trumbauer. Salary demands began to rise, and the club had its shortcomings, which proved a bad combination in the end, and the arrangement only lasted for some 3 weeks. It was not long until other talents would be seeking his name. From across the Atlantic, Fred Elizalde, a young London-based band leader was leading a band at the Savoy Hotel, and he was looking for the best American jazzmen to spice up his already hot sound. He found Rollini, as well as Chelsea Quealey, Bobby Davis, Tommy Felline and Jack Russin. Rollini submitted his resignation to the Ramblers (where he was replaced by bass saxist Spencer Clark and later by bassist-tubist Ward Lay), and agreed to join Elizalde, along with fellow Ramblers Quealey, Felline, Russin, and (later) Davis, in 1927, and stayed until September 1928. Once he returned to America he also began to write, working with Robbins Music Corporation—some of his compositions would include "Preparation", "On Edge", "Nonchalance", "Lightly and Politely", "Gliding Ghost", and "Au Revoir".

He continued to work, recording with such artists as Bert Lown, Lee Morse, The Dorsey Brothers, Ben Selvin and Jack Teagarden into the depression of the 30s. However, the early 30s saw a shift in musical ideas—away from the "hot", two-beat feel and towards a more staid, conservative sound, and Rollini adapted. In 1932–33 he was part of a short-lived experiment with the Bert Lown band using two bass saxophones, Spencer Clark in the rhythm section and Rollini himself as the fourth sax in the reed team.

In 1933, he formed the Adrian Rollini Orchestra (a studio group assembled for recording), which appeared on Perfect, Vocalion, Melotone, Banner, and Romeo labels. While Rollini did manage to assemble some great talent (for example Bunny Berigan, Benny Goodman and Jack Teagarden), these records were more commercial in comparison to his earlier work. Several examples have solo work and proto-swing elements, but on the whole the records were meant to sell current pop tunes. (Several sides have Rollini on bass sax only to switch to vibraphone during the song.) At this time Rollini also appeared as a vibraphonist with Richard Himber's radio orchestra, playing a strictly secondary role in the large, string-oriented ensemble.

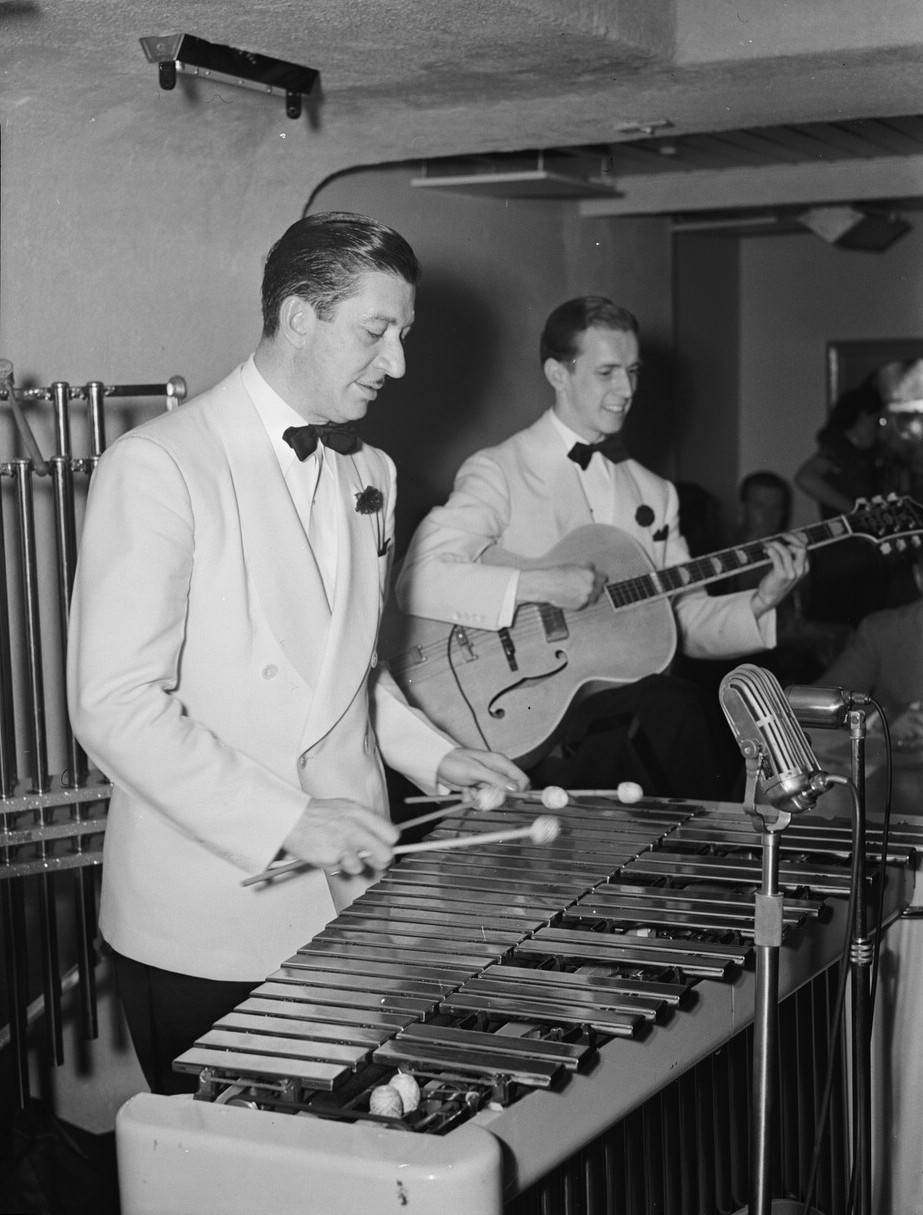
Rollini (left) with Allen Hanlon c. 1946–48

Adrian Rollini was part of several musical groups, including the Adrian Rollini Quintette, the Adrian Rollini Trio (primarily in the late 1930s), and Adrian and his Tap Room Gang, which was based in the Hotel President at 234 West 48th Street in New York City. During the early swing era, starting in 1935, he managed Adrian's Tap Room, which was located inside the hotel, as well as leading the small band of 6-8 players. He also owned Whitby Grill, which was situated on West 45th Street. Both establishments were indicative of his inseparability from his professional and social life. His clientele in each club was mostly composed of musicians who were on holiday. Rollini was also featured on the radio, working with artists such as Kate Smith. As if he did not have enough going for him, he ventured into yet another phase of his musical career and opened a store for the sale and repair of musical instruments. The store, known as White Way Musical Products, was located at 1887 Broadway. Rollini strongly believed that the artist playing the instrument knows more about it than the maker who is only concerned with the mechanics. The shop was a hot spot for autograph hounds who trolled the shop in search of famous band leaders. Rollini also frequented the Georgian Room and the Piccadilly Circus Bar, both located in the Piccadilly Hotel. He also began recording for Master and Muzak.

During this time, a gradual shift occurred in Rollini's focus from the bass sax to the vibraphone. This was not so much that Rollini was giving up on the bass saxophone or his abilities, but popular tastes had rendered the instrument unmarketable after the hot jazz era of the 1920s. Rollini recorded on bass sax for the last time in 1938.

He went on to play hotels, as well as arranging and writing songs behind the scenes, collaborating with such names as Vaughan Monroe. However, once the big band era got underway he did not make any major recordings and this period in his life represents the last of his work with the exception of some minor appearance and jam sessions. He can be seen in the 1938 short entitled "Auld Lang Syne", starring James Cagney, and "Melody Masters: Swing Style" (1939). He also did a brief tour in the late 1940s in which he came to the Majestic Theater in downtown Dallas, among other cities.

In his spare time, Rollini considered himself a "waterbug", and was proud of it. He owned a 21-foot Chris Craft speedboat and a Chris Craft cruiser, sleeping four. After an exhaustive career, he made his last recording with his trio in the early 1950s and then turned his attention fully to the hotel business. He later relocated to Florida and opened the Eden Roc Hotel in September 1955. He also ran the Driftwood Inn at Tavernier Key. Rollini loved sport-fishing, and his Driftwood offered deep-sea fishing charters. After Rollini's death, it appears his wife Dixie left Florida. The remains of the old Driftwood Inn were completely destroyed in a hurricane that rocked the Florida Keys in 1960.

== Death and legacy ==
Rollini died on May 15, 1956 at the age of 52. The true cause of his death is debated. A brief article in the British magazine Melody Maker says that his brother, Arthur Rollini, was "trying to solve the mystery" regarding his death. Adrian was found lying in a blood-splattered car with one of his feet almost severed. Rollini claimed he had fallen, but the police looked into the possibility of foul play. After being sent to the James Archer Smith Hospital of Homestead, Florida, he died 18 days later. His death was reported as being caused by pneumonia and complications to the liver.

Coroner Frederick J. Spencer, author of Jazz and Death: Medical Profiles of Jazz Greats, later analyzed Rollini's death and argued Rollini died of mercury poisoning. During his stay in the hospital, he had developed a resistance to feeding. A glass tube weighted with mercury had been inserted into his stomach and broke, exposing Rollini to the toxic element. In an alternate account, clarinetist Kenny Davern, a friend of Rollini, stated in a video interview that Rollini was murdered in a mob-related hit as a result of his gambling debts. Jazz historian Al Rose, a friend and neighbor of Rollini, said that it was speculated that he may have been killed for robbing other people's lobster pots.

After his death, jazz discographer Brian Rust presented a memorial program on the World of Jazz series hosted by BBC Light Programme on June 8 of that year. In 1998, Adrian Rollini was inducted into the Big Band and Jazz Hall of Fame. He was survived by his wife, Dorothy "Dixie" Rollini who later died in 1977.

== Discography as leader/coleader ==
- 1923–26 - Varsity Eight (Timeless Historical, 2000) Actually a California Ramblers alias
- 1924–27 - Adrian Rollini and the Golden Gate Orchestra 1924–1927: Their Hottest Titles Recorded for the Pathé and Plaza Labels (Timeless Historical, 2006). Another California Ramblers alias
- 1924-25 - The Goofus Five, (Timeless Historical, 1998) Another California Ramblers alias
- 1926-27 - The Goofus Five, (Timeless Historical, 1998) Another California Ramblers alias
- 1925-28 - The California Ramblers (Timeless Historical, 1998)
- 1924-27 - The Little Ramblers (Timeless Historical, 1997)
- 1925-00 - California Ramblers on Edison (Retrieval, 2011)
- 1929–34 - Adrian Rollini 1929–34 (2xCD) (Jazz Oracle, 2005) The first CD Reissued as Adrian Rollini as a Sideman, Volume 1: 1929–1933 (Jazz Oracle, 2006)
- 1934-38 - Adrian Rollini 1934–1938 (Retrieval, 2004)
- 1937-38 - Adrian Rollini 1937–1938 (Retrieval, 2005)
- 1936–47 - Adrian Rollini Trio, Quartet and Quintet, (Vintage Music Productions, 2005)
- 1938-40 - His Quintet, His Trio (CoolNote, )
- 1949 - Adrian Rollini Trio (Mercury, 1950)

=== Anthologies ===
Duplicates the above titles

- 1926-35 - Bouncin' in Rhythm, (Pavilion Recs., 1995) reissued as Tap Room Swing, (ASV Living Era, 2002) (compilation under Trumbauer, Beiderbecke, Venuti-Lang, Elhizalde, & Rollini band names)
- 1934-38 - Swing Low (Affinity, 1992)

== Bibliography ==
- Rollini, Arthur (1987). Thirty Years with the Big Bands. Palgrave Macmillan. ISBN 978-13490-9430-1. OCLC 671565332.
- van Delden, Ate (2020). Adrian Rollini: The Life and Music of a Jazz Rambler. University Press of Mississippi. ISBN 978-1-496-82515-5. OCLC 1130367097.
