= Chelsea Quealey =

American jazz trumpeter (1905–1950)

- Born: Chelsea Ellsworth Quealey; March 12, 1905; Sandy Hook, Connecticut, U.S.
- Died: May 6, 1950 (aged 44) Las Vegas, Nevada, U.S.
- Genres: Jazz
- Occupation: Musician
- Instrument: Trumpet
- Formerly of: California Ramblers

Chelsea Ellsworth Quealey (March 12, 1905 in Sandy Hook, Connecticut – May 6, 1950 in Las Vegas, Nevada) was an American jazz trumpeter.

Quealey began as a reedist but eventually settled on trumpet, playing with Jan Garber in 1925 and the California Ramblers in 1926-27. Between 1927 and 1929 he played in England, on recordings with Fred Elizalde and also in Bert Firman's band. Upon his return to the U.S. he worked with Don Voorhees, Paul Whiteman, and Ben Pollack in the early 1930s, and later in the decade with Isham Jones (1935–36), Red McKenzie, Joe Marsala, Frankie Trumbauer (1937), and Bob Zurke (1939-40). In the early and middle 1940s he played Dixieland jazz at Nick's in New York City. In 1946 he moved to California, where he essentially retired due to heart problems.
