= Xaphoon =

Woodwind musical instrument

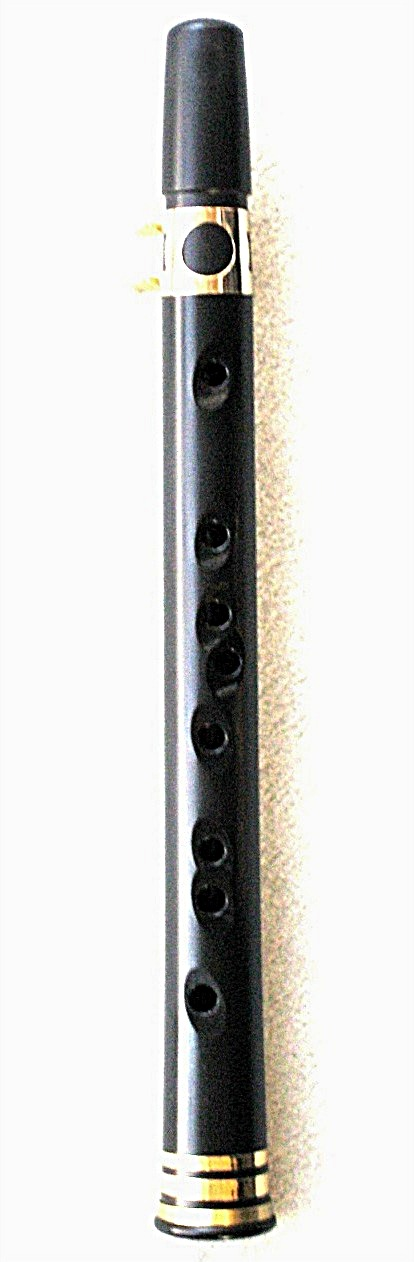

Woodwind instrument
- Classification: Aerophone; Wind; Woodwind; Single-reed
- Hornbostel–Sachs classification: 422.211.2 (Single reed with cylindrical bore and fingerholes)
- Inventor: Brian L. Wittman
- Developed: 1972

Playing range

Related instruments
- Saxophone; Clarinet; Hot fountain pen

Builders
- Maui Xaphoon

The xaphoon (/zæˈfuːn/ zaf-OON) is a chromatic keyless single-reed woodwind instrument invented in 1972, and a registered trademark of its inventor, Brian Lee Wittman. It has a closed cylindrical bore and a very slightly flared bell. The xaphoon has a full chromatic range of two octaves, and overblows at the twelfth like the clarinet.

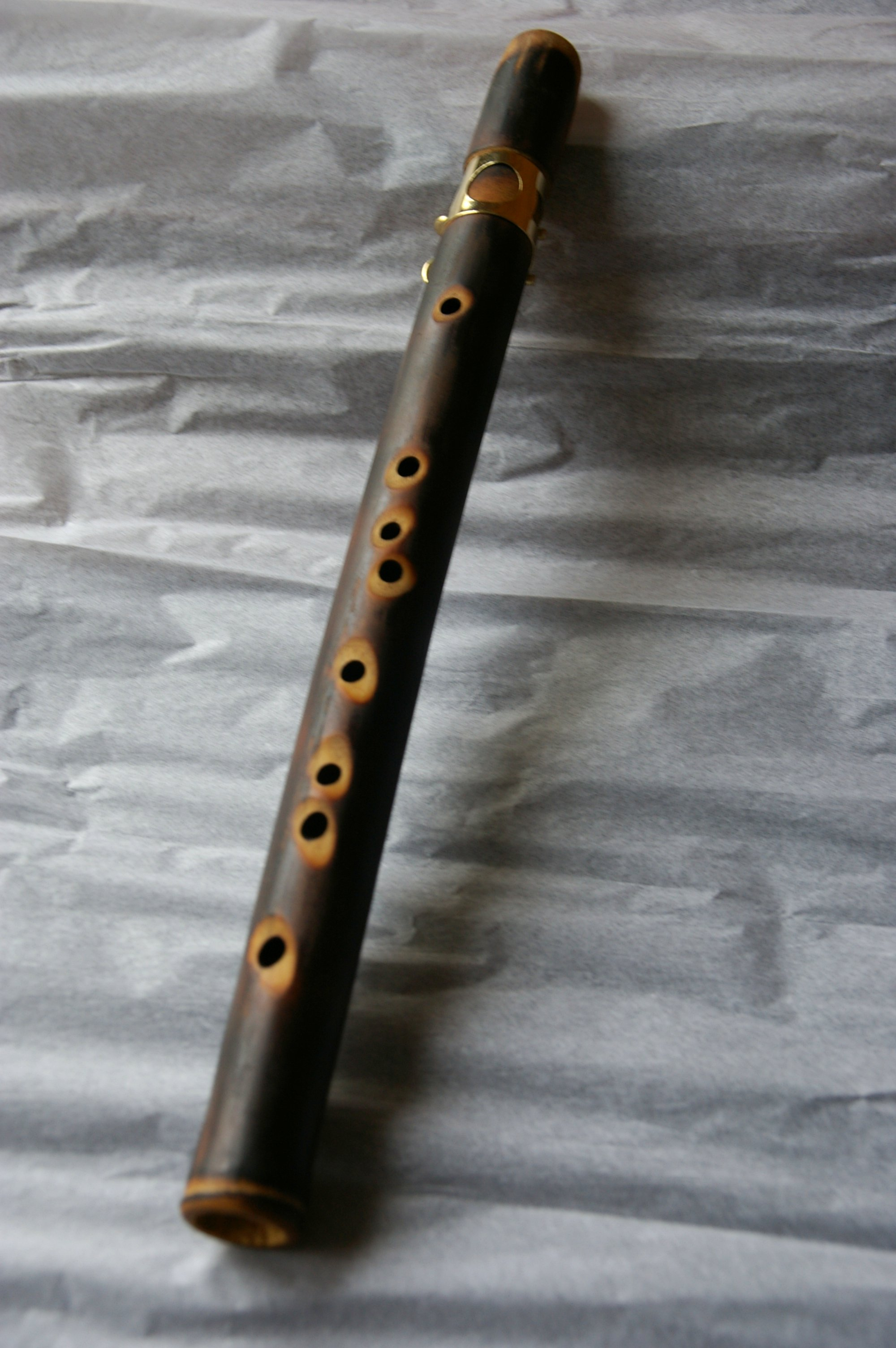
A B♭ Xaphoon from Maui

== History ==
The first xaphoon, made out of bamboo in 1972, was a spontaneous effort by Brian Wittman, a saxophonist and multi-instrumentalist from Hawaii, to create an instrument for a young child who liked the sound of the saxophone. After failing to get a satisfactory sound out of an improvised bamboo flute, Wittman cut a mouthpiece opening and attached a tenor sax reed to it. Wittman was impressed by the sound of the simple instrument. After playing it at performances, other musicians were curious and asked him to make more; thus he refined the instrument, patented it, and started to manufacture and sell it.

== Overview ==
The xaphoon's tone sounds like a clarinet or a saxophone, and is suitable for playing music in similar genres such as jazz or klezmer, although it has also been used to play music of other traditions. It uses a standard tenor saxophone reed. The xaphoon has nine tone holes: eight holes in front, and one hole in back for the left thumb, superficially resembling those of a recorder. The xaphoon's fingerings, however, are significantly different from those of either a saxophone or recorder.

The most common instrument, in C, is 12.5 inches or 32 cm long. Due to having a closed bore instead of an open bore like a recorder, its range is an octave below recorders of comparable length; for example, the soprano recorder's lowest note is C5, while the C xaphoon's is one octave lower at C4. The standard range is two octaves, although experienced players are able to extend the range of the larger sized instruments above that. Due to its short length and large finger-hole size, the pitch of individual notes can be raised and lowered easily, making the xaphoon equally well-suited to play Turkish, Middle Eastern, and other musical scales outside the European tradition. The xaphoon is similar to the chalumeau, a European keyless single-reed instrument that was the ancestor of the clarinet, and has a comparable range. Although it has a complete chromatic scale, the maker considers it a primarily diatonic instrument, capable of playing well in a small number of keys.

== Materials and makers ==
The xaphoon has been made commercially available by Brian Wittman since 1975; Wittman still makes approximately 1500 bamboo instruments per year by hand at his home on the island of Maui, Hawaii, using local bamboo selected from the forests of the eastern end of the island. The xaphoon is available from Maui Xaphoon (Brian Wittman's company) in the keys of C, B♭, D, and G (as well as any other key via special order).

Due to its popularity, it became impossible to fulfill all orders manually using bamboo, and thus in the spring of 2000, a molded ABS version of the xaphoon following Wittman's patented design was introduced. These instruments are made under license by Indiana Plastics in Elkhart, Indiana, and are marketed under the trade name Xaphoon Pocket Sax. Currently, it is available in the key of C, with its lowest tone middle C. The instrument is sturdy, and the reed can be protected by a cap when not played. By 2010, a total of approximately 60,000 Xaphoons and 60,000 Pocket Saxes had been made.

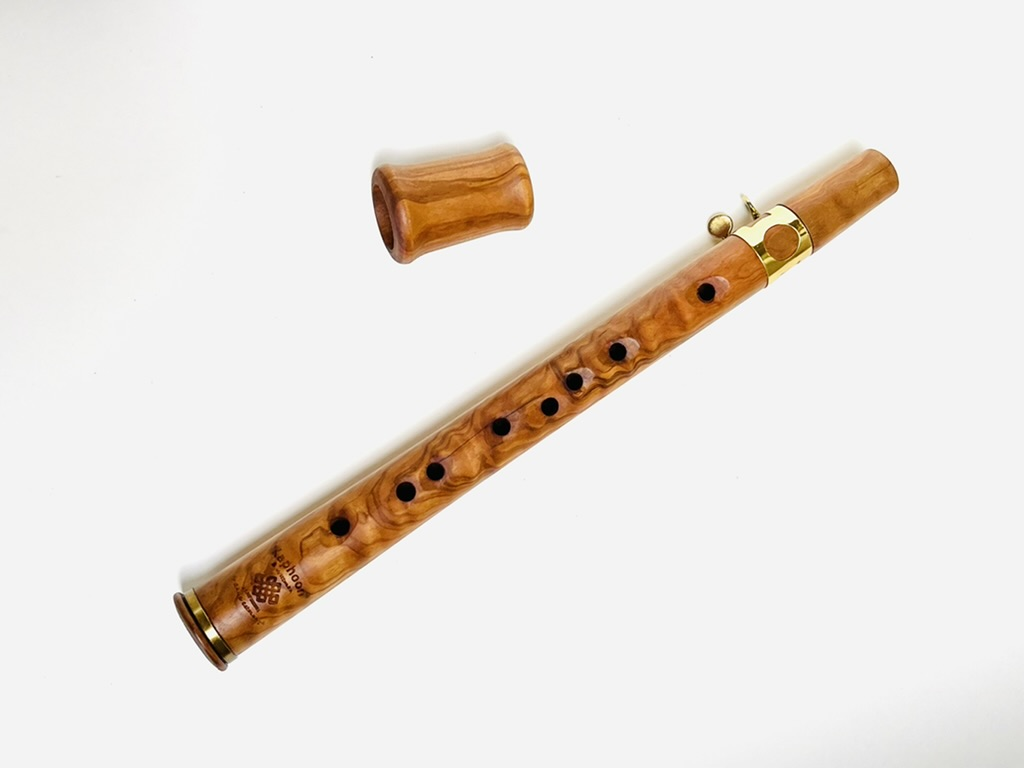
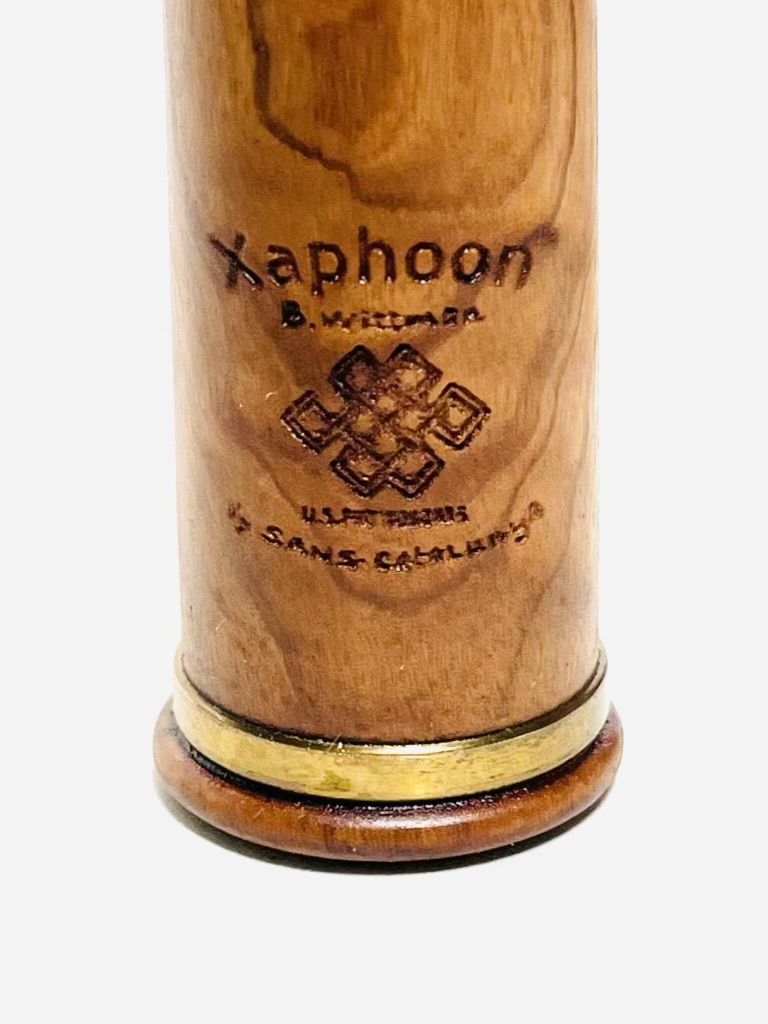
Xaphoon de Catalunya

In the spring of 2012, Wittman began a collaboration with Francesc Sans Sastre, a long-established luthier in Sant Jaume de Llierca, Spain, to produce hand-made wooden xaphoons in strict accordance with the original xaphoon design. These oak and olive wood xaphoons are sold under the name "Xaphoon de Catalunya".

While the word "xaphoon" is often used to denote any type of small keyless single-reed woodwind instrument, the term remains a registered trade name. Only instruments produced by Brian Wittman (Maui Xaphoon), Indiana Plastics (Xaphoon Pocket Sax), or Sans Luthier (Xaphoon de Catalunya) are allowed to use the xaphoon trademark.

== See also ==
- Chalumeau
- Clarinet
- Saxophone
- Hot fountain pen
- Venova
