= Couesnophone =

Free-reed musical instrument

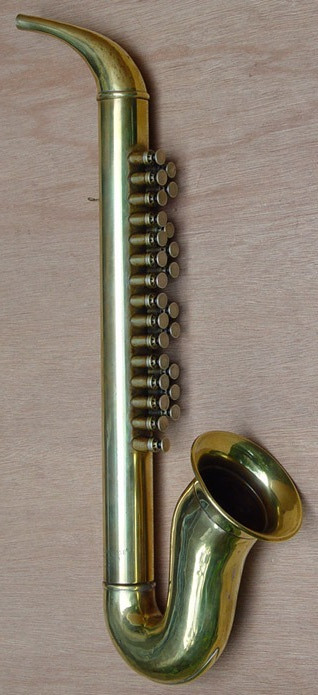
Couesnophone by French manufacturer Couesnon

The couesnophone, also known as the goofus or queenophone, is a free-reed musical instrument in a saxophone shape, patented by French instrument manufacturer Couesnon in 1924. Its reeds vibrate when the desired keys are activated and the player blows through a tube. It has been described as a type of mouth-blown accordion, with a sound somewhere between that of a harmonica and an accordion.

== Construction ==
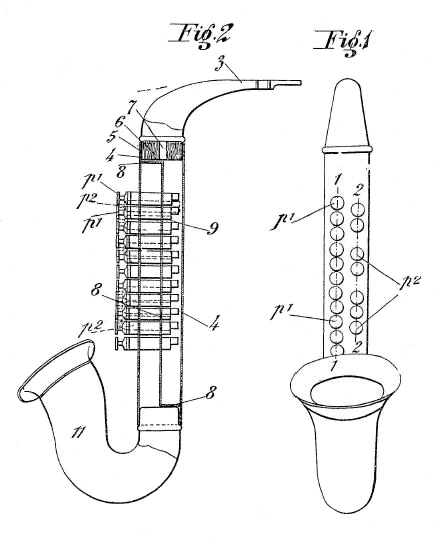
Illustration from French manufacturer Couesnon's 1924 patent

Couesnon was awarded patent no. 569294 for an instrument that was described as a saxophone jouet (lit. 'toy saxophone'). Unlike the saxophone, the couesnophone is a polyphonic instrument with a set of single reeds, one for each of the notes produced, similar to a melodica. The keys are set in a keyboard with a layout similar to that of the early Hohner melodicas, in parallel rows corresponding to the white and black keys of a piano. Its rubber mouthpiece allows the horn be held and played vertically like a saxophone, or horizontally like a flute or melodica.

== Performers ==
The couesnophone was introduced into jazz and America by bass saxophonist and vibraphonist Adrian Rollini, though he is sometimes credited with its invention. The term "goofus" might have been coined by jazz musicians such as Rollini, or Ed Kirkeby, because it is easier to pronounce.

Recordings with Rollini on goofus include The Little Ramblers' "Deep Elm"; The Goofus Five's "Everybody Love My Baby" and "Oh! How I Love My Darling"; the Varsity Eight's "How I Love That Girl", "Doo Wacka Doo", "Oh! Mabel", "Happy (Watchin' All the Clouds Roll By)", "Ain't My Baby Grand?", and "I Ain't Got Nobody to Love"; and Joe Venuti and the Eddie Lang Blue Five's "Raggin' the Scale". Don Redman played the goofus on "You'll Never Get to Heaven With Those Eyes", "A New Kind of Man (With a New Kind of Love for Me)", and "Cold Mammas (Burn Me Up)".
