= Fred Elizalde =

Spanish Filipino pianist, composer, conductor and bandleader (1907 - 1979)

- Born: Federico Elizalde y Díaz-Moreu; December 12, 1907; Manila, Philippine Islands
- Died: January 16, 1979 (aged 71); Manila, Philippines
- Education: Madrid Royal Conservatory; Stanford University
- Relatives: Joaquín Miguel Elizalde (brother); Manolo Elizalde (brother)
- Musical career
- Genres: Classical, jazz, dance band
- Occupations: Musician, composer, conductor, bandleader
- Instrument: Piano
- Years active: 1926–1974

Federico "Fred" Elizalde y Díaz-Moreu (December 12, 1907 – January 16, 1979) was a Filipino classical and jazz pianist, composer, conductor, and bandleader, influential in the British dance band era.

== Early life and education ==
Elizalde was born in Manila, Philippines, to Spanish Filipino parents José Joaquín Elizalde y Aicinena (the Philippine-born son of immigrant-merchant Joaquín Marcelino Elizalde e Yrisarry of Elizondo, Navarre, Spain, and of Carmen Díaz-Moreu e Yrissary (another Philippine-born Spaniard, daughter of the Spanish admiral Emilio Díaz-Moreu.. His paternal grandfather, Joaquín Marcelino Elizalde e Yrisarry, emigrated to the Philippines from Elizondo, Navarre. He was a brother of diplomat Joaquín Miguel, polo players Juan Miguel and Ángel, businessman Manuel, and Carmen.

At age seven he moved to Spain and entered the Madrid Royal Conservatory, winning the first prize in piano at age 14. He then studied at St. Joseph's College, London and went to study law at Stanford University in the 1920s. His musical interests prevailed and he left the university. He took composition lessons under Ernst Bloch at Stanford, and gave up law temporarily for music, leaving the school in 1926.

== Career ==
=== Quinquaginta Band ===
Upon leaving university, Elizalde embarked on a career as a jazz bandleader, leading the Stanford University Band at the Biltmore Hotel in Los Angeles, while he studied composition. He recorded with the Cinderella Roof Orchestra in 1926, then returned to England, where he entered Cambridge University in the autumn as a law student. This lasted only a year; soon after reaching England, Elizalde formed a new band, the Quinquaginta Band, which became successful and influential on the development of British jazz music in the late 1920s.

Elizalde playing his piano solo "Rhythm Step", 1927, London

Elizalde criticized British dance music for its Viennese qualities, and sought to bring more American principles of rhythm to the British scene. He recorded with his band in 1927 under several ensemble names for Brunswick and Decca, including the Cambridge Undergraduates. In his run at the Savoy Hotel in London, his band featured many of the best players in early British jazz, including Jack Jackson, as well as Americans such as Chelsea Quealey, Fud Livingston, Adrian Rollini, and Arthur Rollini. In December 1928, he released a short film Christmas Party, filmed in the DeForest Phonofilm sound-on-film process.

The band was voted best popular dance orchestra in Melody Maker in 1928, but older guests at the Savoy were offended by his music, and controversial broadcasts over the BBC did not help his case. In July 1929, his contract expired and was not renewed." In the same period, Elizalde composed works which melded jazz and European concert music elements, including "The Heart of a Nigger" (1927; produced in 1928 by Sergei Diaghilev) and "Bataclan" (1929).

In 1928, he visited Germany and became closely associated with Siegfried Wagner. He also conducted orchestras in Germany, Belgium and the Netherlands. In 1928, he wrote the music for Pola Negri's final silent film, The Way of Lost Souls (1929; a.k.a. The Woman He Scorned).

=== Conductor and composer ===
Elizalde broke up his band in 1929, after a poorly received tour in Scotland and the onset of the Great Depression, which necessitated the return home of many of his American sidemen. He led a new group at the Duchess Theater in London in 1930, but later that year returned to Manila to accept a position as conductor of the Manila Symphony Orchestra. By now he had received his parents' permission to devote himself entirely to music (he was still only 23). He conducted in the 1930s in Biarritz, Paris, and Madrid, and recorded for the last time in 1933 on a brief return trip to Britain. His symphonic poems Jota, Spiritual and Moods were written in these years. In 1931-33 he was in Paris, where he was closely associated with Maurice Ravel and Darius Milhaud, and conducted the first performances of some of Milhaud's works. In 1932 he composed some songs for Conchita Supervía and incidental music for La pajara pinta by Rafael Alberti.

While in Spain, Elizalde studied under and spent much time with Manuel de Falla, who always regarded him as one of his best interpreters. On one occasion he conducted Falla's Harpsichord Concerto with the composer at the keyboard. He also set to music Titeres de Cachiporra and Don Perlimplin by Federico García Lorca, with whom he was also closely associated. In 1935 he was named as Spanish delegate to the Maggio Musicale Fiorentino. In 1936 he conducted his Sinfonia Concertante for piano and orchestra, with Leopoldo Querol as soloist.

At the outbreak of the Spanish Civil War in 1936, he returned from France to enroll in the Requeti troops of Navarre, a Basque regiment on the Nationalist side. He was wounded and decorated during the war. He first emigrated to Manila then moved to France, where he lived under confinement in a house near Bayonne under the German occupation.

During this time he composed extensively, his works including:

- an opera on the life of Paul Gauguin, to a libretto by Théophile Briant; it was broadcast in 1948 by Radiodiffusion Française to celebrate the centenary of Gauguin's birth
- a violin concerto; Ginette Neveu gave its premiere in Paris in 1944, and Christian Ferras gave its London premiere under the direction of Gaston Poulet, in the presence of the composer, and made the world premiere recording on November 7, 1947, when he was aged only 14
- a string quartet, and
- a piano concerto, premiered by Leopoldo Querol in 1947 in Paris; Elizalde himself played the piano concerto at Besançon with the Colonne Orchestra under Gaston Poulet, and again with the London Symphony Orchestra (LSO) in the Albert Hall.

In 1948, he returned once more to Manila, where he again conducted the Manila Symphony Orchestra, founded the Manila Little Symphony Orchestra, and became president of the Manila Broadcasting Company. He did some conducting in Japan, and led the London Symphony Orchestra at the Royal Festival Hall during the Festival of Britain in 1951, but otherwise did little work outside the Philippines through until his 1974 retirement.

He and Bob Stewart had a music show on Philippine television, The Maestro and Uncle Bob (GMA, 1978–1979).

== Personal life ==
Outside of music, Elizalde was a sharpshooter who won gold medals as captain of the Philippines shooting team in the 1954 Asiad.

=== Death ===
Elizalde died in Manila on January 16, 1976, at the age of 71.
