= Catherine Tackley =

British musicologist

Catherine Jane Tackley (born Catherine Jane Parsonage) is a musicologist and academic. She holds a PhD from City, University London (awarded in 2002) and then worked at Leeds College of Music. She was appointed to a lectureship in music at the Open University in 2008; promotions to senior lecturer and professor followed in 2011 and April 2016, before she was appointed professor of music at the University of Liverpool in August 2016. She is interested in historical and critical musicology with a focus on jazz and popular music. She has also worked on maritime music in Britain and the Atlantic.

== Selected publications ==
- The Evolution of Jazz in Britain, 1880–1935 (Ashgate, 2005).
- Benny Goodman's Famous 1938 Carnegie Hall Jazz Concert (Oxford University Press, 2012).
- (Edited with Jason Toynbee and Mark Doffman) Black British Jazz: Routes, Ownership and Performance, Ashgate Popular and Folk Music series (Routledge, 2016).
