= The Breakdown =

1926 painting by John Bulloch Souter

- 1962 reconstruction of the lost 1926 original. (Full Image)
- Artist: John Bulloch Souter
- Year: 1926
- Medium: Oil on canvas
- Subject: Marita Ross (nude model)
- Dimensions: 51 cm × 53.5 cm (20 in × 21.1 in)
- Condition: Lost (Destroyed)

The Breakdown was a 1926 painting by Scottish artist John Bulloch Souter (1890–1972) which stirred controversy in the United Kingdom during the Jazz Age. The work depicted a black jazz musician playing the saxophone while a naked white woman dances, as if in a trance.

Amid outrage in the British press, the painting was withdrawn from the Royal Academy Summer Exhibition in 1926 after one week at the request of the British Colonial Office as the subject matter "was considered to be obnoxious to British subjects living abroad in daily contact with a coloured population".

The painting was then destroyed by its author and his wife, but Souter preserved his preparatory drawings and made a reconstructed version in 1962, one decade before his death. The painting has been described as embodying the fears of Western civilization towards jazz music.

== Description and themes ==
In Souter's painting, a negro jazz musician is in full white tie evening dress with a top hat; he sits on a cast down and shattered classical statue of Minerva, the goddess of virginity and traditional values. Nearby, an androgynous female dancer – a flapper with short bobbed hair – has her eyes are closed, as if she is in a trance. Her hastily discarded lingerie and green leather shoes are scattered on the ground, with just one green earring visible. A flesh-colored stocking lies draped over the statue's broken arm.

The musician's race and instrument signifies that he is playing jazz music. He is black and the woman is white, playing on contemporaneous concerns about the popularity of (predominantly black) jazz music to the (predominantly white) British public, and the perceived threat posed by hypersexualised and exoticised black men to white women. However, according to critic Karl Toepfer, "the musician gazes not at the woman but out toward the spectator, and the implication is that jazz and dance together allow man and woman to cross racial barriers and form a new and mysteriously intimate (or trusting) sort of couple, each immersed in separate aspirations."

Souter's stated intention was to "illustrate the tendency nowadays for Jazz's influence to permeate our daily lives", and to "suggest the fascination exercised by the primitive and savage upon the over-civilised". The title of his painting was a twin reference to both "a musical breakdown," in which a jazz musician has the freedom to express their own improvised statement, and "a societal breakdown" in which women in British society could express a similar freedom now that gender roles had been redefined.

== Reception ==
=== Popular enthusiasm ===
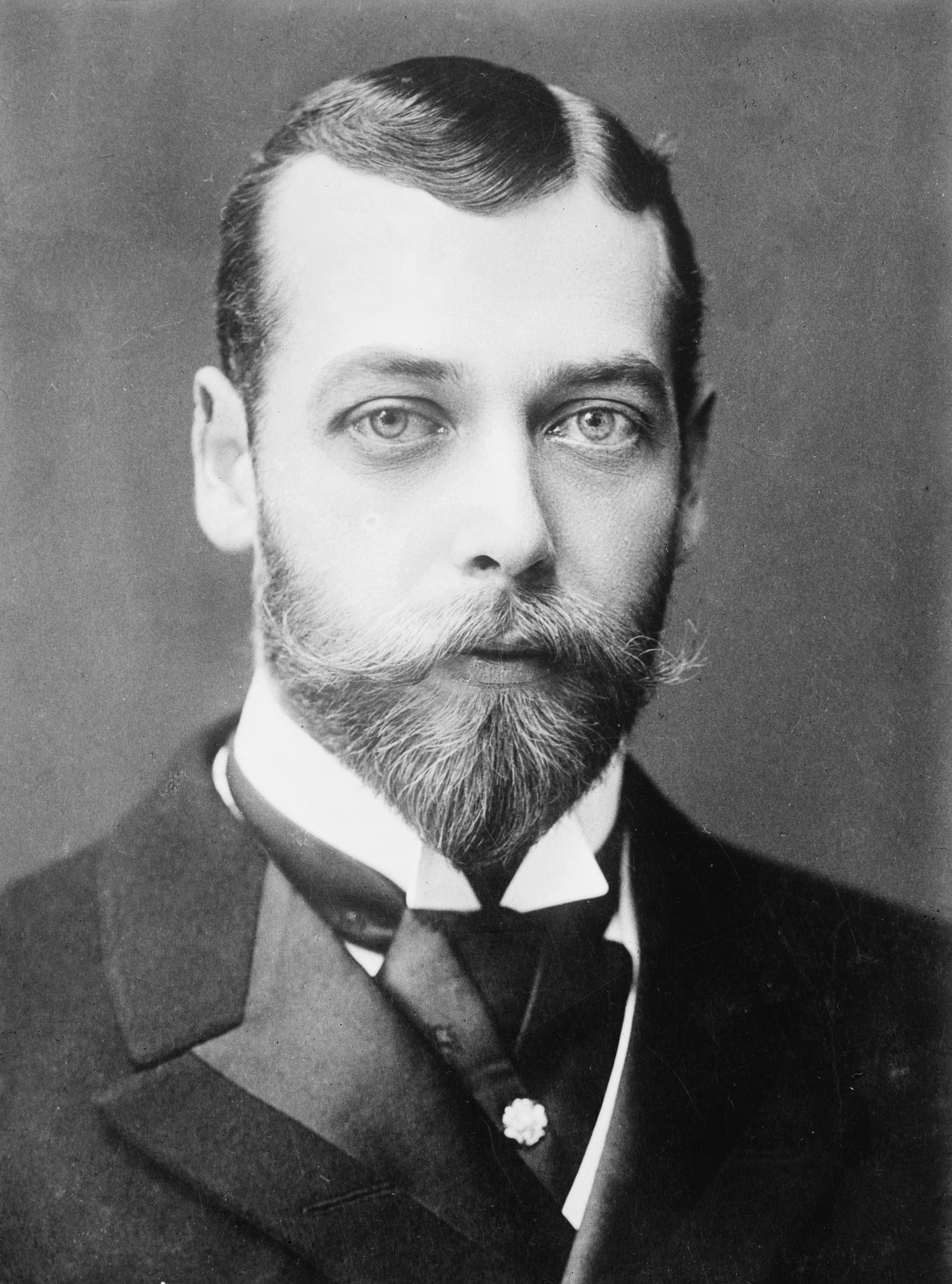
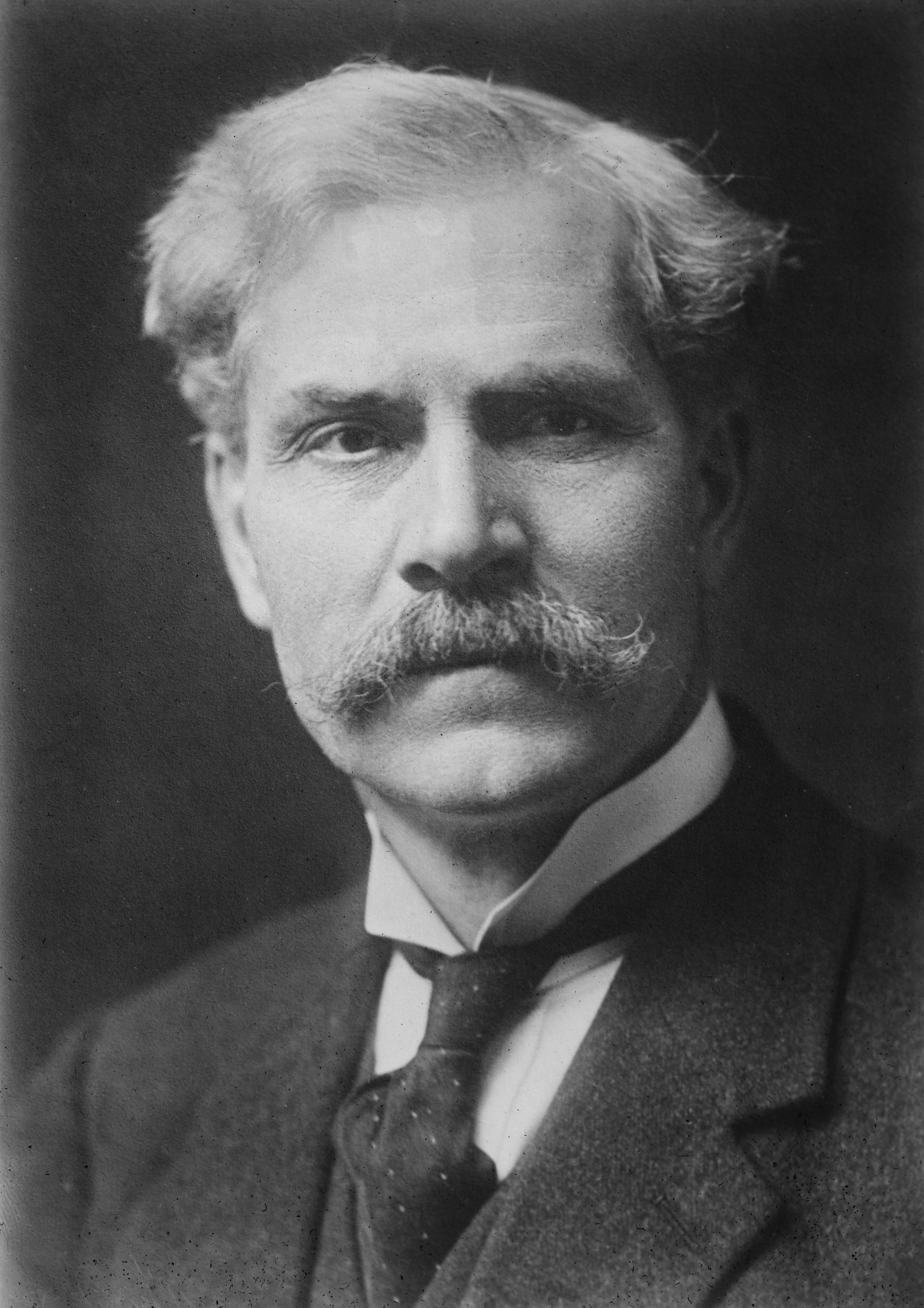
George V and future British Prime Minister Ramsay MacDonald were among many notables who viewed the painting at its exhibition.

The painting was exhibited at the Royal Academy Summer Exhibition starting on 3 May 1926, the day before the start of the 1926 General Strike. The painting was viewed by King George V, British statesman Ramsay MacDonald, the Countess Baldwin of Bewdley, Lady Cynthia Asquith, Dame Lloyd George, and other notable personages. Initially, Frank Dicksee, the President of the Royal Academy, praised Souter's piece as "a work of great promise by executed with a considerable degree of excellence". According to Catherine Tackley, professor of music at the University of Liverpool, "the reaction to the painting epitomise[d] the response to this new jazz music" with "huge popular enthusiasm" mixed with "an undercurrent of suspicion that this was a dangerous new art form subverting decent society."

Ultimately, at the request of the Colonial Office, which considered the painting "to be obnoxious to British subjects living abroad in daily contact with a coloured population", the painting was removed after merely five days and replaced by an uncontroversial portrait of Lady Diana Manners by James Jebusa Shannon. Despite its removal, word of Souter's painting had already spread, and crowds of excited visitors thronged to the exhibition only to search the walls in vain for the sequestered work. Explanations by the exhibition's attendants did little to convince disappointed audiences that it had been withdrawn upon "the request of the Colonial Office who disapproved, from the Colonial standpoint, of the subject—a negro playing jazz for a nude white dancer." The only remaining evidence that the painting had been exhibited was a photograph of the work displayed in the front hall.

=== Press condemnation ===
The work was widely condemned in British newspapers and periodicals and its exhibition quickly became controversial. In an early edition of the Melody Maker, a British weekly music magazine, London-born critic Edgar Jackson demanded the painting be encindered:

"Breakdown" is not only a picture entirely nude of the respect due to the chastity and morality of the younger generation but in the degradation it implies to modern white woman there is the perversive danger to the community and the best thing that could happen to it is to have it ... burnt!

The world press likewise fixated upon the painting. In the United States of America, a journalist for The New York Times assailed the work as "this year's problem picture." After conceding that "as a protest against the jazz age, the picture seems undoubtedly effective," the Times journalist nevertheless opined that the work would excite needless controversy and should not have been exhibited. Similarly, Boston Evening Transcript criticised the work under the headline "A Racial Outrage" and claimed the painting was designed "to horrify decent people". Likewise, in South Africa, the Cape Argus deemed the work to be a "problem picture ... Negro Supersedes Minerva".

== Destruction ==
Following outrage by the press and the painting's withdrawal from exhibition, Souter and his wife Christian Grace Reid destroyed his original 1926 painting, but Souter kept his preparatory drawings. For decades the work was only known from a photograph published in the exhibition catalogue but, towards the end of his life, Souter made a second version in the 1960s. A charcoal study was acquired by the Aberdeen Art Gallery in 2016, with funding from the Scottish National Fund for Acquisitions.

== Legacy and influence ==
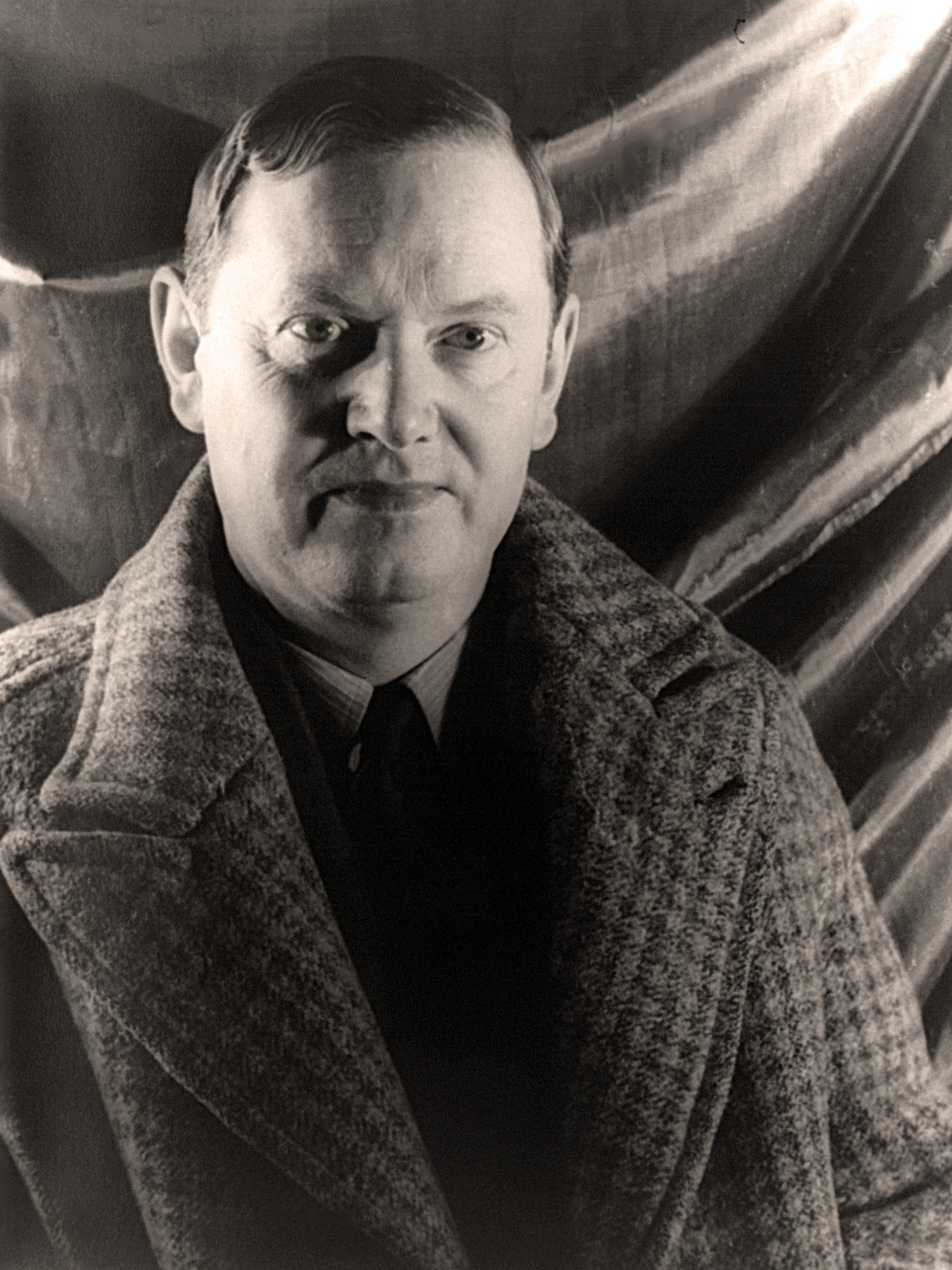
Author Evelyn Waugh purportedly attended the exhibition and the painting inspired a later novel.

English writer Evelyn Waugh attended the exhibition in its first week. The controversy over the painting may have inspired him to include a mixed-race relationship between his fictional characters of the white Margot and black Chokey in his 1928 novel Decline and Fall.

According to Gemma Romain, a historian and researcher focusing on black history in Britain, Souter's now-destroyed Jazz Age work retains considerable legacy as a landmark in British culture:

"Although the original work no longer exists, the removal of The Breakdown from the walls of Burlington House was a significant moment in the history of the Academy Summer Exhibition and inter-war Britain. It provoked much discussion in relation to art and race, and ideas of British 'decline' and the concurrent General Strike, while revealing that other institutions of the British establishment, such as the Colonial Office, could exercise their influence at the Academy to remove exhibits from public view."

== Bibliography ==
- Blake, Jody (1999). Le Tumulte Noir: Modernist Art and Popular Entertainment in Jazz-Age Paris, 1900-1930. Pennsylvania State University Press. pp. 89–90. ISBN 978-0-271-01753-2.
- "Distinguished Crowd at London Art Exhibit: Ramsay MacDonald Views Portrait of Himself — Mrs. Baldwin Sees One of Premier". The New York Times. New York. 1 May 1926. p. 2.
- "John Bulloch Souter" (PDF). Rendezvous Gallery. Archived from the original (PDF) on 24 April 2018.
- Kennedy, Maev (24 January 2018). "Racist undertones of Britain's Jazz Age explored in exhibition". The Guardian.
- McKay, George (2005). Circular Breathing: The Cultural Politics of Jazz in Britain. Duke University Press. pp. 121–122. ISBN 978-0-8223-8728-2.
- McKay, George (26 January 2018). "Jazz, Race and J.B. Souter's 'The Breakdown' (1926)".
- "Our London Letter: Souter Picture Banned from Academy. Offence Taken in the Colonies". The North-China Herald. 19 June 1926.
- Parsonage, Catherine (2007). Wynn, Neil A. (ed.). Cross the Water Blues: African American Music in Europe. Jackson: University Press of Mississippi. p. 95. ISBN 978-1-60473-547-5.
- Romain, Gemma (30 May 2018). "1926 Interwar London and Race". The Royal Academy Summer Exhibition: A Chronicle, 1769–2018. Paul Mellon Centre for Studies in British Art.
- Shearer, Carly (24 April 2018). "The Threat of Jazz: John Bulloch Souter's The Breakdown". Lyon & Turnbull.
- "Souter, John 'Jack' Bulloch". Suffolk Artists.
- "Study for 'The Breakdown'". Aberdeen Art Gallery & Museums Collections.
- Tackley, Catherine (2018). Rhythm & Reaction: The Age of Jazz in Britain (PDF). London: Two Temple Place. pp. 9–10.
- Tackley, Catherine (2005). The Evolution of Jazz in Britain, 1880-1935. London and New York: Routledge. p. 188. ISBN 978-1-351-54475-7.
- Toepfer, Karl Eric (1997). Empire of Ecstasy: Nudity and Movement in German Body Culture, 1910-1935. Berkeley: University of California Press. pp. 320, 364. ISBN 978-0-520-91827-6.
- Waugh, Evelyn (2001) [1928]. Bradshaw, David (ed.). Decline and Fall: A Novel of Many Manners. London: Penguin Modern Classics. p. xxi. ISBN 978-0-14-118090-8.
