= William Foley (artist) =

American painter (1926–2020)

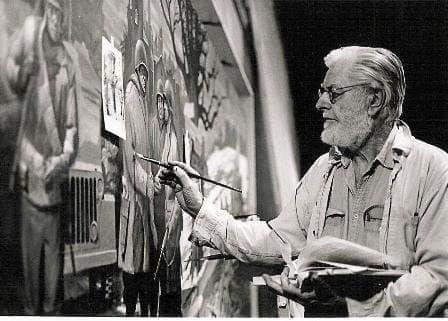
- Born: William Arthur Foley Jr. August 8, 1926; Edgewater, New Jersey, U.S.
- Died: April 18, 2020 (aged 93); Dallas, Texas, U.S.
- Known for: Sketch Artist, Author, Muralist
- Notable work: 94th Mural, Visions From A Foxhole
- Spouse: Nadia Foley (m. 1993)
- Awards: WWII Victory Medal -- visionsfromafoxhole.webs.com -->

William Arthur Foley Jr. (August 8, 1926 – April 18, 2020) was an American painter, sketch artist, muralist, and author whose work focused on his personal experience during World War II. At the age of eighteen, Foley fought on the front lines of the Battle of The Bulge in the 94th Infantry Division as a rifleman. As he fought he began sketching his experiences daily. These sketches later transformed into paintings after the war and would later form the basis for his career and reputation as an artist and author. He died in April 2020 at the age of 93.

== Biography ==
During World War II, Foley was a rifleman in the 302nd infantry regiment of the 94th Infantry Division “Ghost Corps” under General George Patton, whose campaign was focused on getting past the Siegfried Line, and also participated in the Battle of the Bulge. As an eighteen-year-old, Foley began drawing sketches of events on the battlefield in a sketchbook he carried with him. These sketches were preserved in part because they were able to be stashed in a cardboard tube that previously held a mortar shell. Later, he also drew some war scenes from memory. Foley went on to work commercially as an illustrator and traveled around the world exhibiting his work while accepting commissions of many artwork projects. Mr. Foley was survived by his wife Nadia Curto Foley, children, William A. Foley III and Irene Zitzner.

== Major works ==
Some of Foley's work has been featured at the National Guard Militia Museum of New Jersey, National World War II Museum, and the Pritzker Military Library. The exhibit at the latter contains over 40 of his works, including pencil and ink sketches as well as oil paintings. In 2003, Foley finished 94th Mural to honor the 94th Infantry Division, which is displayed at the Massachusetts State House in Boston.

Foley's memoir Visions from a Foxhole: A Rifleman in Patton's Ghost Corps was published in 2007. It includes several accounts from wartime, focusing on the actions and accounts on the battlefield rather than the larger context of the war. He notes that victories on the battlefield were not a cause for celebration, and expresses his understanding of soldiers who deserted their posts, given the difficulties of war. Foley's account of the war has been described as "one of the most outstanding memoirs in recent memory", in particular his descriptions of Germany, which are compared to landscapes as described by Dante Alighieri.

== Published works ==
- Visions from a Foxhole: A Rifleman in Patton's Ghost Corps Novato, Calif.: Presidio Press, 2013. ISBN 0-307-41765-4OCLC 869464995
