= Yellow Odalisque =

Two paintings by Henri Matisse

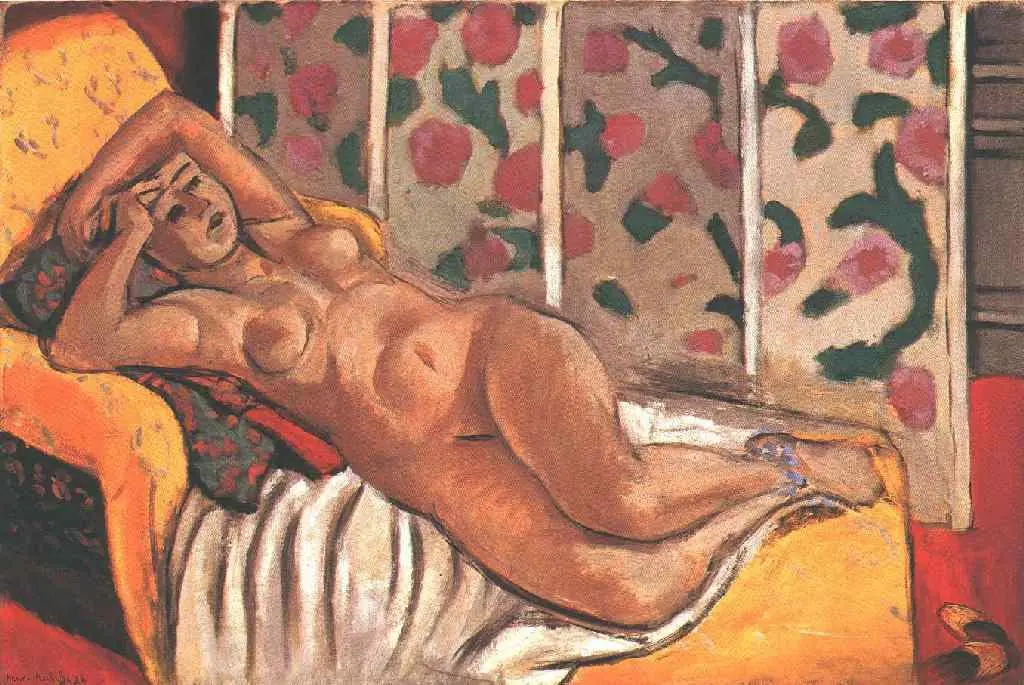
Nude on a Yellow Sofa, 1926, Henri Matisse

Yellow Odalisque is the title of two paintings by Henri Matisse which feature odalisques:

- From 1926, at the National Gallery of Canada, Ottawa; also known as Nude on a Yellow Sofa
- From 1937, at the Philadelphia Museum of Art, Philadelphia

== See also ==
- List of works by Henri Matisse
