= Cirque Calder =

Sculpture by Alexander Calder

- Artist: Alexander Calder
- Year: 1926–1931
- Type: sculpture
- Dimensions: 137.2 cm × 239.4 cm × 239.4 cm (54.0 in × 94.3 in × 94.3 in)
- Location: Whitney Museum, New York, New York
- Owner: Whitney Museum

Cirque Calder is an artistic rendering and performance of a circus created by the American artist Alexander Calder through the late 1920s. It involves wire models rigged to perform the various functions of the circus performers they represent, from contortionists to sword eaters to lion tamers. The models are composed of diverse materials, most notably wire, fabric, and wood. During his time in Paris, Calder began improvising circus shows. During the performance, he would narrate in French.

The Cirque Calder is part of the permanent collection of the Whitney Museum in New York City. From October 18, 2025 – March 9, 2026, the Whitney exhibited it in High Wire: Calder’s Circus at 100 to celebrate the centennial of the work.

== Historical background ==
Calder largely produced and performed his circus while living in Paris where he moved in 1926 with the earliest iteration of the project already underway. Calder attended the Ringling Brothers and Barnum and Bailey's Circus at Madison Square Garden on assignment for the National Police Gazette. From this visit, he produced a line drawing titled Seeing the Circus with "Sandy" Calder which was published on May 23, 1925. After the initial assignment he spent another two weeks with the circus at their winter grounds in Sarasota, Florida. When Calder was first in Paris, he produced a couple of animal toys for the Gould Manufacturing Company based in Oshkosh, Wisconsin which can be seen as a precursor to his circus project.

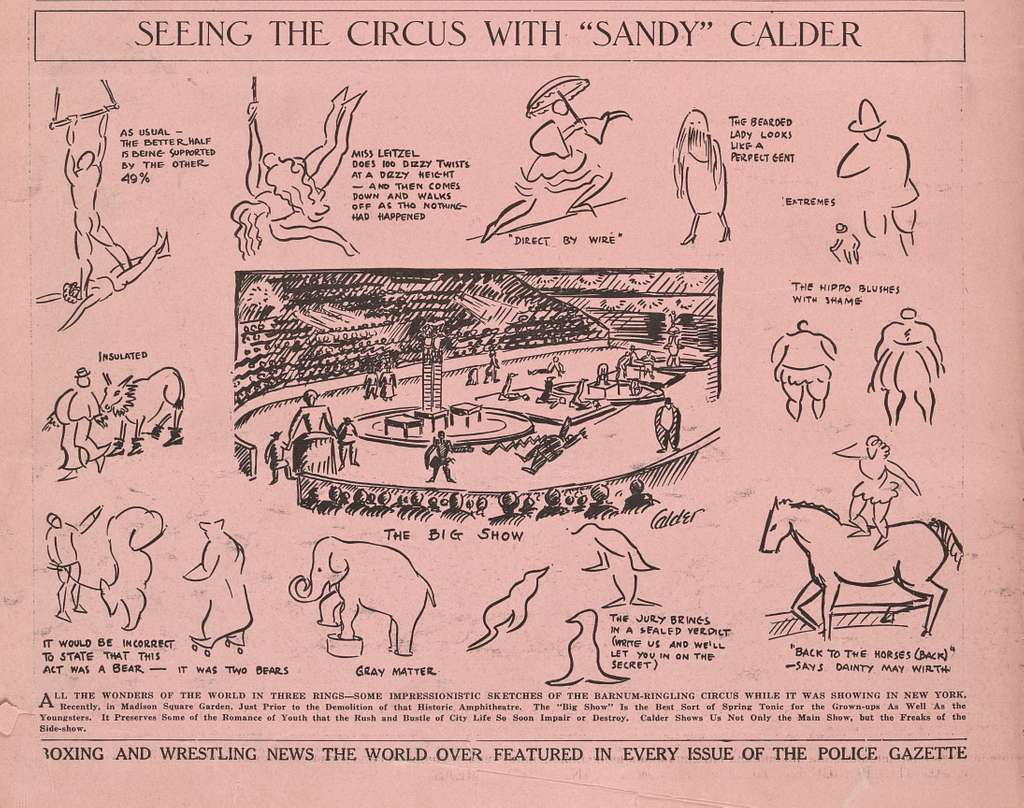
Seeing the Circus with "Sandy" Calder. Alexander Calder's Circus Drawings for the National Police Gazette.

The Cirque Calder is more performance than sculpture and during its development Calder would perform it frequently from 1926 through the mid-1930s and with less frequency thereafter. With the continued performance of the circus, there was development over time of the creation as Calder worked on it, on such addition being a net added under the trapeze. The performances of Cirque Calder involved Calder seated or kneeling on the floor, manipulating his figures in their acts and narrating and introducing them almost as the ringleader. During the performances, an assistant (in the later years his wife took this role) would control the musical accompaniment from a victrola. Performances were often held in Calder's own apartment or those of friends or artists studios and would be rather intimate, casual events. At times, viewers would even have to bring their own seating to the performances.

Many people were present for the numerous performances of the Cirque Calder, including in 1927 a group of circus performers and Le Grand-Chabrier, a circus critic who then wrote a rave review of the performance for Commoedia. Often other artists were present at Calder's performances including, Joan Miró, Piet Mondrian, Marcel Duchamp, Jean Arp, and Isamu Noguchi.

After five years of development Calder kept the project in five suitcases, and it was in five suitcases that the Cirque Calder arrived to the Whitney Museum ahead of the 1972 exhibition.

== Subject and material ==
Cirque Calder was not intended as a static sculptural work of art. Before being shown in a museum exhibition in the 1960s, the only way the objects of the Cirque Calder were seen were while in performance as Calder put them in motion. When the circus first came to the Whitney for exhibition, there were a number of unknown elements and the museum now counts 337 circus elements in their catalog. Figures in the circus were primarily made of readily found materials including wire, cloth, yarn, and cork and are mostly about six inches tall.

For the performances, Calder would make printed flyers and invitations and at times he would serve peanuts, have makeshift bleachers, and a spotlight on the ring.

Some of Calder's circus performers were based on real circus performers from both French and American circuses that Calder had seen. Although after study of the Cirque Calder and working with real acrobats and models, it has been determined that some of the actions performed by Calder's figures are not possible in real life.

Calder's acrobats have lead weights on their feet to be able to attach and be brought across the tightropes. The pony can be attached to a wire armature that allows it to gallop around the ring. Calder's pegasus with the dogs at the wheels of the chariot was based after Madame Bradna's circus act. Some of the elements and performers in the Cirque Calder appear in multiple acts, such as the horse which was used in the cowgirl act, the cowboy act, and the lady bareback rider act.

While the Cirque Calder is an early work in Calder's oeuvre, the central elements of the circus are movement and materiality, much like his later mobile work for which he is most known.

== Calder's declining interest ==
Despite Cirque Calder becoming one of Calder's most well known works, the artist already "wished to be done" with it as early as 1930. In a letter written to his parents in May 1930, Calder wrote of plans to "shut up the [circus]", as "it hinders my work". Calder's attention was moving elsewhere in the early 1930s, and, as 1940 approached, the frequency of Cirque Calder performances had decreased. As the 1950s began, Calder found the physical exertion required to perform the circus increasingly taxing, especially given his large frame.

== Sale to Whitney Museum ==
Upon Calder's death in 1976, his estate had to sell the Cirque Calder to settle the taxes. Having been on loan to the Whitney by the artist from 1970, a fundraising effort was made for the museum to permanently acquire the work in 1983. In fifteen days, the museum was able to raise a million dollars to keep the circus, and it has been in their collection and under their care ever since.

== Major exhibitions ==
- Calder's Circus curated by Robert Doty at the Whitney Museum of American Art. April 21-June 11, 1972.
- Alexander Calder: The Paris Years, 1926-1933 at the Whitney Museum of American Art. October 16, 2008 – February 15, 2009.
- High Wire: Calder's Circus at 100 as the Whitney Museum of American Art. October 18, 2025 – March 9, 2026.

== Films ==
- Jean Painleve, a French photographer recorded a 1950s performance of the Cirque Calder.
- Carlos Vilardebó, a Franco-Portuguese director, filmed the final circus activation in 1961.

== See also ==
- List of Alexander Calder public works

== Bibliography ==
- Calder, Alexander. An Autobiography With Pictures. HarperCollins, ISBN 0-06-853268-7.
