= The Bridge near Wiesen =

1926 painting by Ernst Ludwig Kirchner

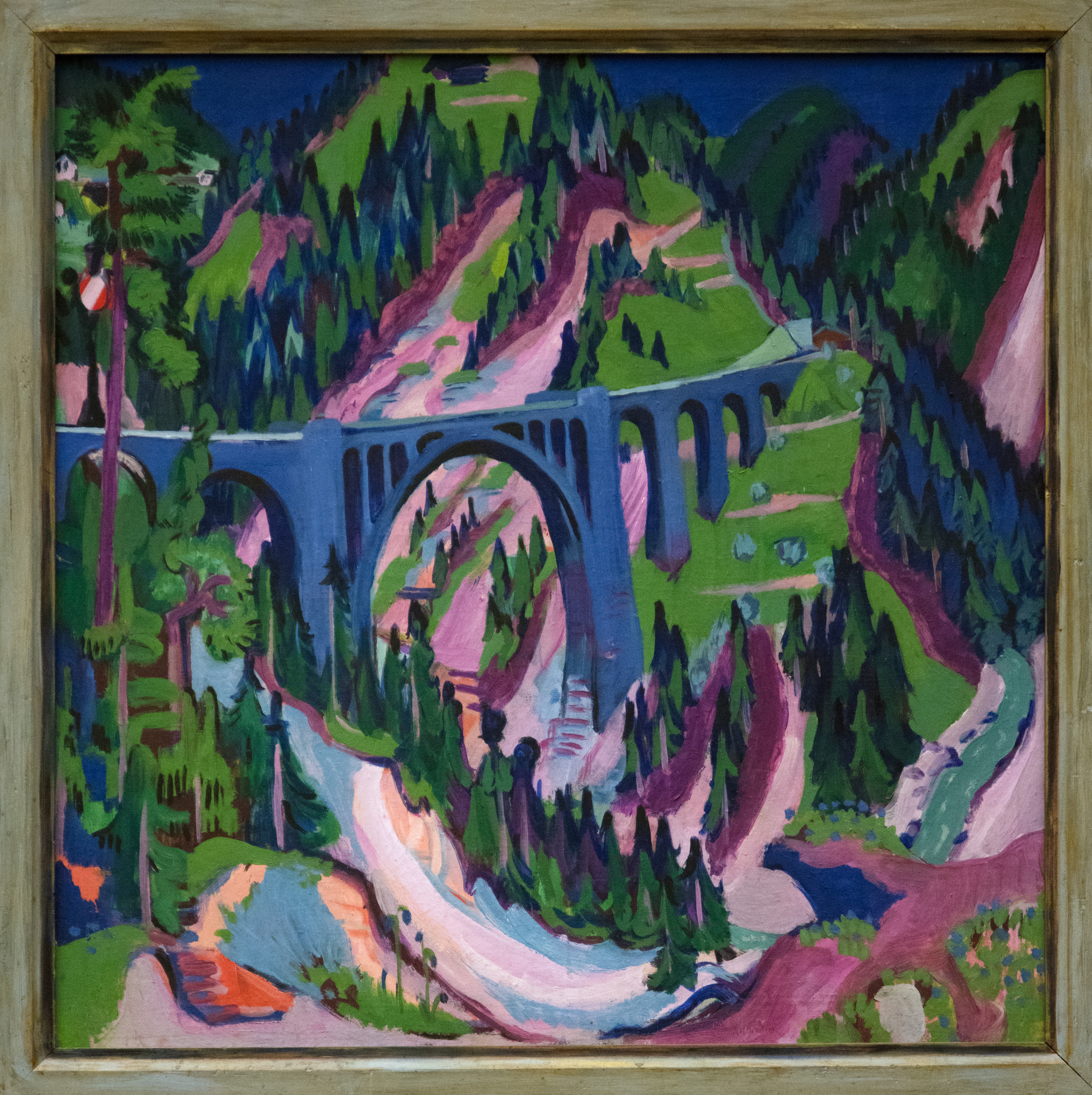
- Artist: Ernst Ludwig Kirchner
- Year: 1926
- Medium: Oil on canvas
- Dimensions: 120 cm × 120 cm (47 in × 47 in)
- Location: Kirchner Museum Davos, Davos

The Bridge near Wiesen, also known as The Bridge at Wiesen, is an oil-on-canvas painting by the German painter Ernst Ludwig Kirchner, from 1926. It depicts the Wiesen Viaduct, south of Davos, in Switzerland. It is signed on the bottom right of the center and is dated '26' on the back. The painting is held at the Kirchner Museum Davos.

== History and description ==
In the years 1925/1926, a stylistic change started to appear in Kirchner's work. In his depictions of people he tried more abstract approaches, while in his landscapes he pursued a precise representationalism without formal experiments such as the distortions painted earlier.

It is not known for how long Kirchner worked on this painting and when he began the preparatory work. However, a draft sketch of the painting, which Kirchner made as earlier as 1924, has survived. This preparatory drawing was donated to the Kirchner Museum Davos from a private collection in Hamburg.

The center of the painting depicts the railway viaduct of the Rhaetian Railway over the Landwasser river near Davos-Wiesen, a well-known structure of Alpine railway architecture. The structure had been completed in 1909, so it was still quite new when the painting was made. Kirchner depicts a view of the viaduct as seen from the south. Compared to Kirchner's earlier depictions of buildings and structures, which often showed distorted proportions and perspectives, this image is closer to reality. In his depiction, Kirchner pays attention to the lines of the bridge and precisely reproduces the parabolic construction of the main arch and the semicircular formation of the smaller arches. The colors of the picture do not correspond to reality, but to Kirchner's artistic conception.

A red and white railway signal can be seen above the bridge on the left side of the painting, a so-called Hippsche turning disc. The signal was left as a memorial where its shown here, even after it was decommissioned in 1987, perhaps because Kirchner had immortalized it in this painting.

While Kirchner, who had also a degree in architecture, initially focused on the landscape and its components, over the years the architecture there increasingly became part of the content of the painting, from which the current work is a typical example.

== Provenance ==
In 1933, at the instigation of the art-loving Landammann Erhard Branger, the municipality of Davos acquired the painting Rathaus Davos Platz, directly from Kirchner, after lengthy purchase negotiations, and despite some resistance from the population. The artist not only gave the community a considerable discount on the originally estimated purchase price, but also offered it the current painting.

The Bridge at Wiesen hung with two other paintings by Kirchner at Branger's office in Davos town hall, since the Summer of until he left office in 1936. The whereabouts of the painting in the following decades are unclear. In the 1960s it was open to public view and housed unprotected in the premises of the Davos Tourist Office. Since the late 1960s the painting was exhibited in numerous art museums in European cities and in the United States. The insurance value of the painting increased steadily over time.

In 1982, it was donated to the collection of the Kirchner Museum in Davos, where it still hangs.
