= John Bulloch Souter =

British painter (1890–1972)

John "Jack" Bulloch Souter
- Born: 4 June 1890; Aberdeen, Scotland
- Died: 10 May 1972 (aged 81)
- Education: Elsie Cruikshank (mother); Gray's School of Art
- Known for: Painting, drawing, sculpture
- Notable work: The Breakdown (1926); The Fortune Teller

John "Jack" Bulloch Souter (4 June 1890 – 10 May 1972), also known as J.B. Souter, was a Scottish painter, sculptor, and illustrator, best known for his Jazz Age-themed work The Breakdown.

== Biography ==
Born in Aberdeen in northeast Scotland, he was a skilled pupil at Ferryhill School, then Gray's School of Art, and then the Allan Fraser School in Arbroath. He won the Byrne Travelling Scholarship awarded by the Scottish Education Department which enabled him to comfortably tour the European continent. During this continental tour, he was purportedly much impressed by Diego Velázquez, Johannes Vermeer, and Jean-Baptiste-Siméon Chardin.

Following the outbreak of World War I, Souter served in the Gordon Highlanders and the Royal Army Medical Corps. Upon returning to civilian life, he married Christian Grace Reid and relocated to London. During the post-war period, he garnered a reputation as a talented portraitist, and his many subjects included such personalities as Gladys Cooper, Ivor Novello, and Fay Compton.

Souter exhibited his creations at Redfern Gallery, the Fine Art Society, Royal Scottish Academy and the Royal Academy's Summer Exhibition where his notorious painting The Breakdown was exhibited in 1926 to great controversy. Within days of its exhibition, the British Colonial office contacted the Royal Academy and demanded the immediate removal of the picture as a perceived threat to the British Empire. Following negative attacks in the national and world press, Souter's wife convinced him to destroy the painting—his greatest work—which he reluctantly assented to do, but he clandestinely retained his preparatory drawings.

Amid the chaos and nightly bombing of World War II, he labored in the Censorship Department as a translator but spent the majority of his time restoring paintings at Windsor Castle. In 1952, he retired to Aberdeen where ten years later, despite his failing eyesight, he drew upon his earlier sketches to reconstruct his original work The Breakdown nearly thirty years after its destruction. Souter remained in Aberdeen until his death in 1972.
