= The California Ramblers =

American jazz group

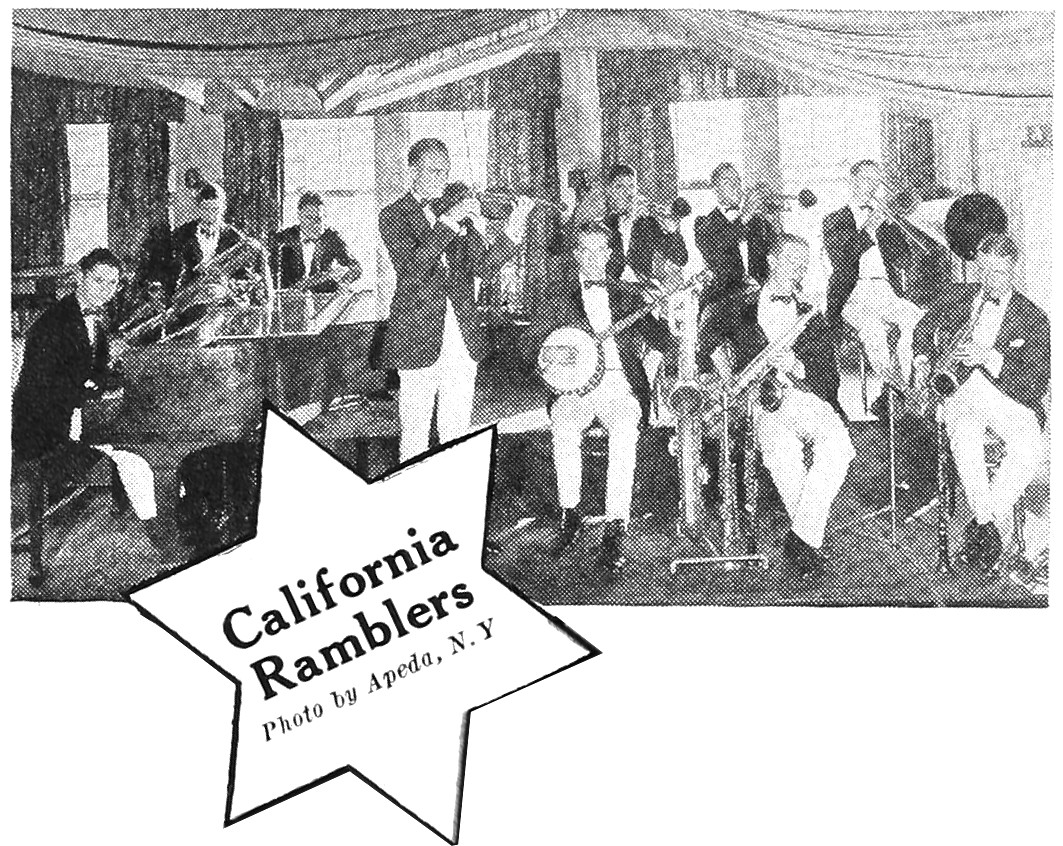
- The California Ramblers, photographed in 1925

Background information
- Genres: Jazz
- Years active: 1921 — 1937
- Labels: Columbia Records; Regal Records (1921); Puritan Records; Paramount Records; Vocalion Records; Okeh Records; Famous Records; Triangle Records; Actuelle Records; Apex Records; Operaphone Records; Beeda Records; Disques Francis Salabert; Bell Records (1920); Gennett Records; Maxsa Records; The Winner Records; Banner Records; Perfect Records; Edison Records; Needle Type Record; Bluebird Records; Variety Records; Regal Zonophone Records; Berlin Phonoworks; Blue Amberol Records; Pathé Records
- Past members: Red Nichols; Jimmy Dorsey; Tommy Dorsey; Adrian Rollini; Ray Kitchenman; Ed Kirkeby

The California Ramblers were an American jazz group that recorded hundreds of songs for many different record labels throughout the 1920s. Four members of the band –Red Nichols, Jimmy Dorsey, Tommy Dorsey, and Adrian Rollini - went on to front big bands in later decades.

The band was formed in 1921 by banjoist Ray Kitchenman. Its members were from Ohio but chose the name California Ramblers. The band was instantly successful and were one of the most prolific recording groups in the 1920s.

In late 1924 the Ramblers signed a contract with Columbia Records and then, in conjunction with their manager Ed Kirkeby, agreed to waive all royalties to Columbia for the right to record for other companies under pseudonyms. They recorded for nearly every independent label in the U.S., Canada, and the UK, using over 100 unique aliases, including The Golden Gate Orchestra, Varsity Eight, Stokers of Hades, and The Goofus Washboards.

The ensemble was reactivated in the late 1970s and 1980s, this time under Dick Sudhalter's managership.
