= Fadno =

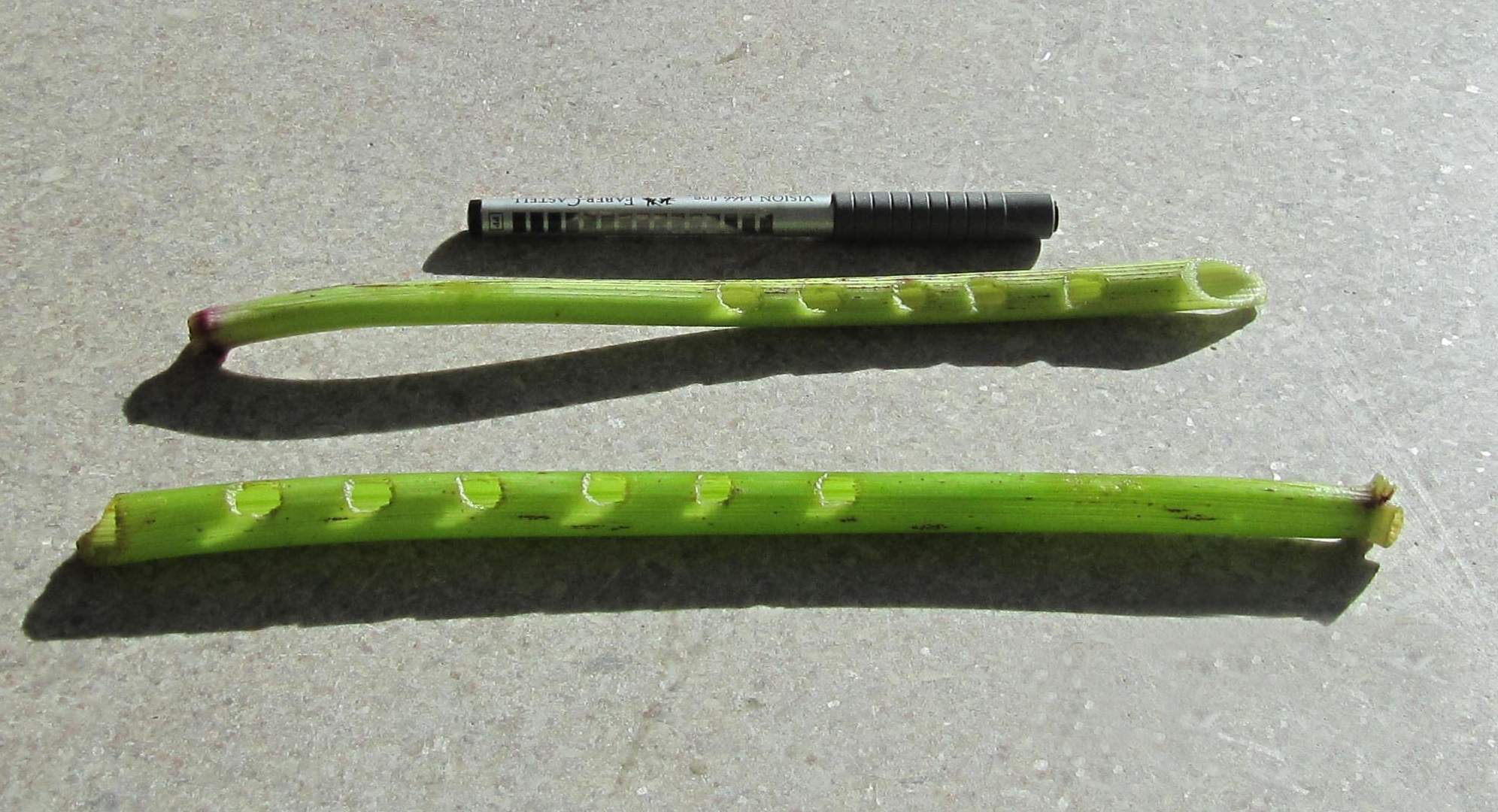
- A picture of 2 fadnos.

Woodwind instrument
- Classification: aerophone
- Hornbostel–Sachs classification: 422.211.2 (single-reed aerophone with cylindrical bore and fingerholes)

Related instruments
- arghul, bülban, clarinet, diplica, dili tuiduk, dozaleh, cifte, launeddas, mijwiz, mock trumpet, pilili, Reclam de xeremies, sipsi, zammara, zummara

Fadno is a reed instrument and domestic flute of the Sami people of Scandinavia, made from Angelica archangelica. The instrument features a reed and three to six (generally four) fingerholes and appears to have no parallels among the surrounding Scandinavian peoples.

== Characteristics ==
The instrument is made from a 15–30 cm length of the angelica plant (fadno, the term for one-year-old angelica), from which the instrument derives its name. The instrument's reed categorized as an "idioglottic concussion reed", meaning the reed is fashioned from the tube itself. Fadnos were played with Sami drums together with joik.
