= Mock trumpet =

Single-reed woodwind instrument

Woodwind instrument
- Classification: aerophone
- Hornbostel–Sachs classification: 422.211.2 (single-reed aerophone with cylindrical bore and fingerholes)

Related instruments
- arghul, bülban, clarinet, diplica, dili tuiduk, dozaleh, Chalumeau, cifte, launeddas, mijwiz, pilili, Reclam de xeremies, sipsi, zammara, zummara

The mock trumpet is a single-reed woodwind instrument popular during the second half of the seventeenth century, especially in England. By the 1720s, the mock trumpet was documented in use in the New World.

The mock trumpet predated the chalumeau and may be one of the primary predecessors of both the chalumeau and clarinet. Thurston Dart wrote that the mock trumpet was the name for the chalumeau in England, and that music was published for it in 1698.

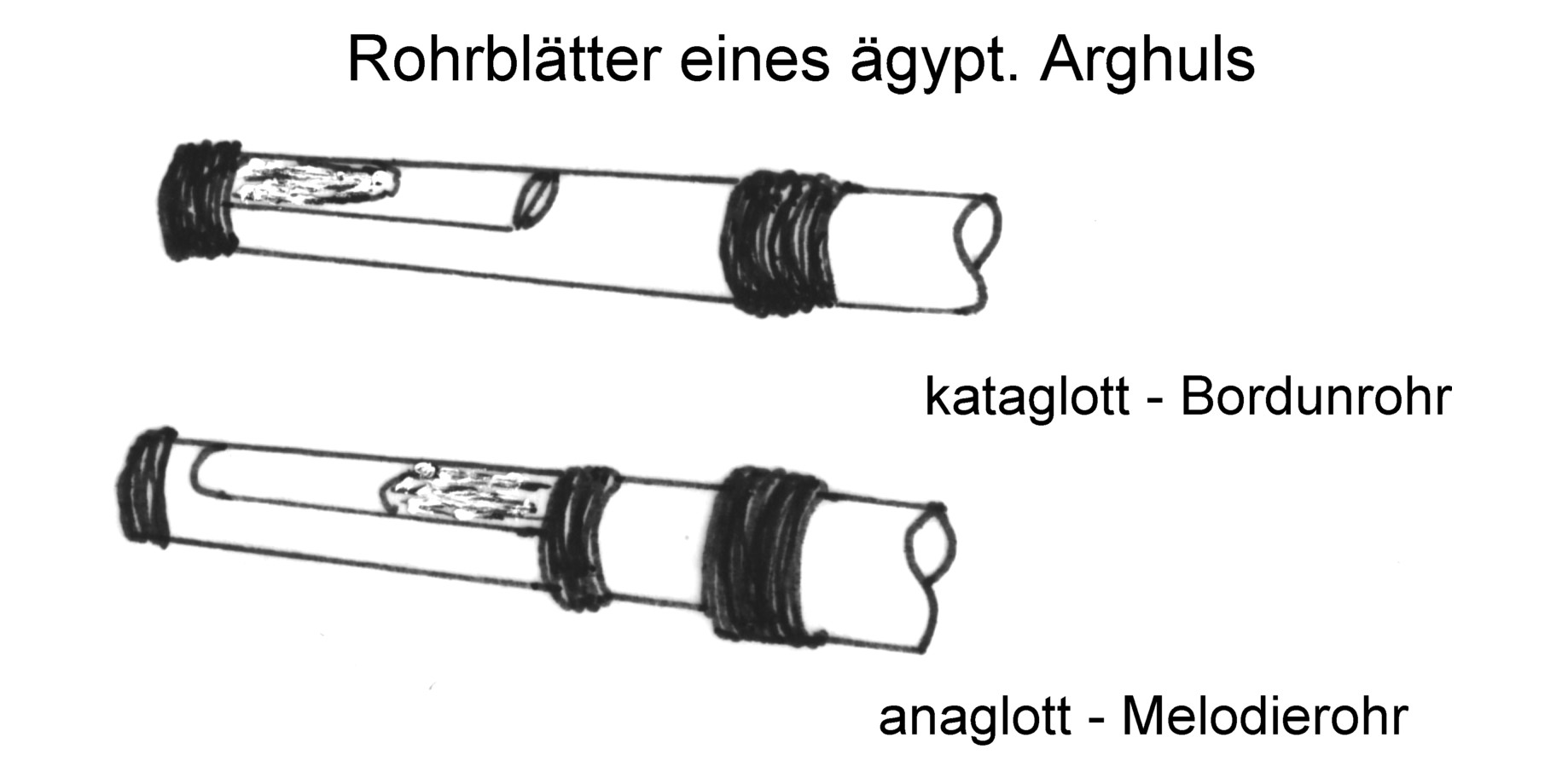
Drawings of idioglot reeds from an arghul, which used both kinds. These are tubular single reeds in which the reed is still part of the reed stem. Also used in bagpipes. Reeds can be split from middle upward (kataglott, the reed hangs down) and from top downward (anaglott, the reed stands up).

Mock trumpets are keyless reed-pipes, closed on one end by the natural joint of the cane and wrapped in leather. The reed is idioglottal, meaning that it is a tongue cut but not detached from the reed itself. The reed was placed on the upper side of the instrument and vibrated against the upper lip; the pipe had six tone holes on top and one in the back. Early chalumeaux used idioglot reeds, as shown in the debate as to whether to install reeds up or down. Rice said the idioglot reed was installed with the split going from the top downward (anaglott).

Documented music for the mock trumpet primarily includes tutors and method books, indicating that this was an instrument studied in the Western Classical tradition.

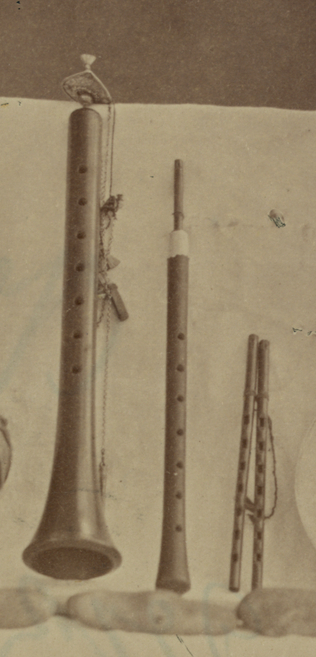
Example of an idioglotic reed pipe with a wooden body (center instrument), Central Asia, circa 1869. From the left: zurna, bülban and dozaleh.

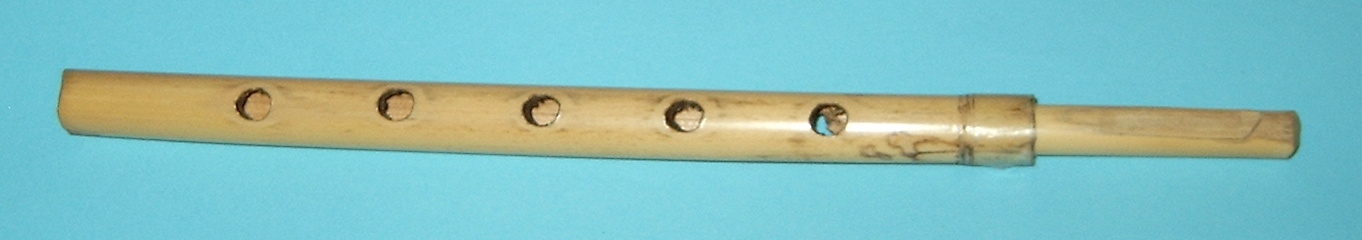
Example of an idioglot reed in a reed body, the sipsi.

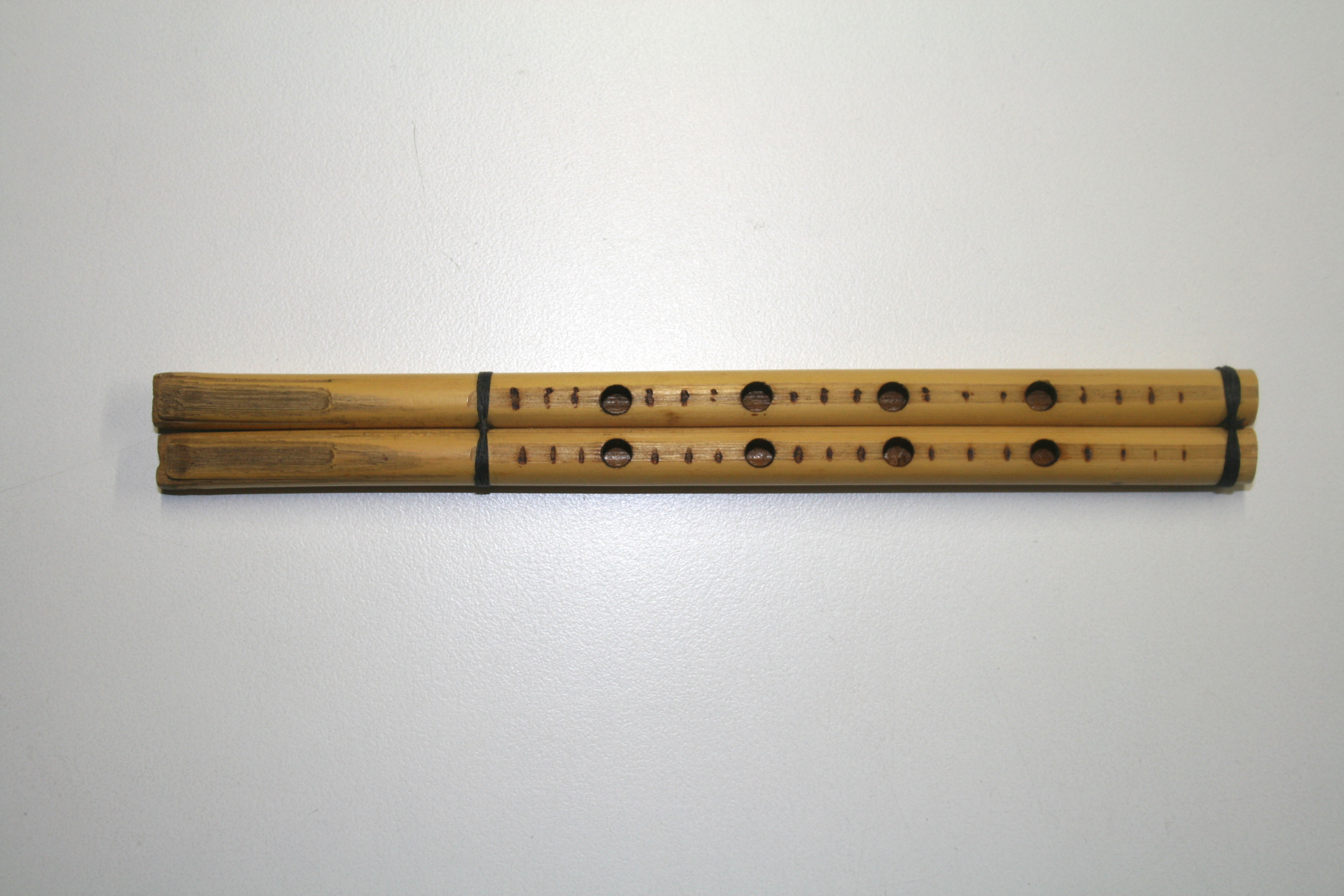
Reed pipes in which the idioglot reeds were carved into the same reed as the rest of the pipe. Reclam de xeremies.

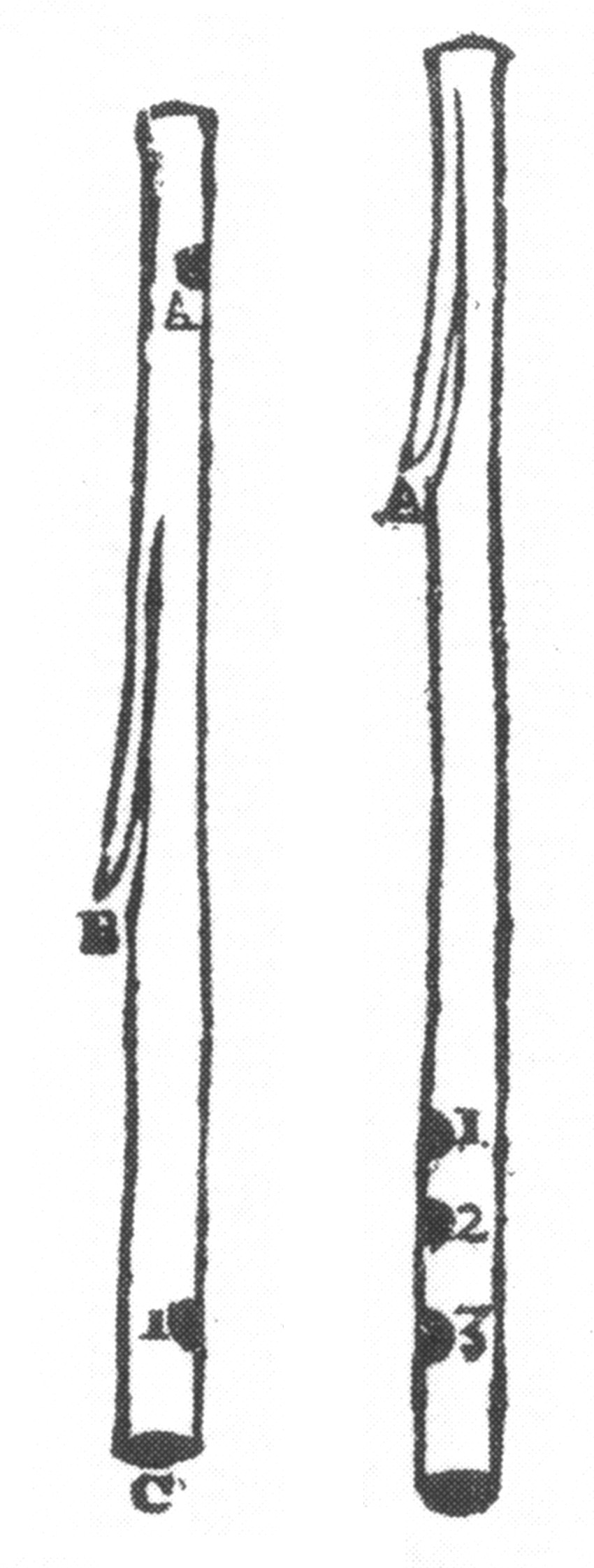
Marin Mersenne's illustration of a chalumeau made from wheat stalks, split to create an idioglot reed.

== Tuning ==
The instrument as played in England was in the key of G. Content from The Fourth Compleat Book for the Mock Trumpet, "published between November 1706 and October 1708" showed the available notes to be G_{4}, A_{4}, B_{4}, C_{5}, D_{5}, E_{5}, F_{5}, G_{5}. (Converted to scientific pitch notation.) While this is almost a diatonic scale in G major, it would need an F^{#} for that. Rather this is C major, with the music included written in that scale.
