= Chalumeau =

Woodwind instrument; predecessor of modern clarinet

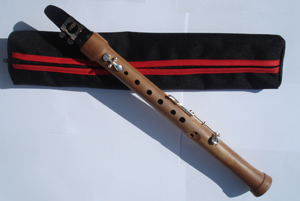
- A Modern School Chalumeau

Woodwind instrument
- Classification: aerophone
- Hornbostel–Sachs classification: 422.211.2 (single-reed aerophone with cylindrical bore and fingerholes)
- Developed: from earliest single-reed instruments, in which the sounding-reed and fingerholes were cut into the plant stem. In late 17th, early 18th century became a detached single-reed mounted on an instrument body of wood.

Related instruments
- heteroglot reed: clarinet idioglott reed: arghul, diplica, dili tuiduk, dozaleh, cifte, launeddas, mijwiz, pilili, Reclam de xeremies, sipsi, zammara, zummara

Sound sample

The chalumeau (English: /ˈʃæləmoʊ/; French: [ʃa.ly.mo]; plural chalumeaux) is a single-reed woodwind instrument of the late baroque and early classical eras. The chalumeau is a folk instrument that is the predecessor to the modern-day clarinet. It has a cylindrical bore with eight tone holes (seven in front and one in back for the thumb) and a broad mouthpiece with a single heteroglot reed (i.e. separate, not a continuous part of the instrument's body) made of cane. Similar to the clarinet, the chalumeau overblows a twelfth.

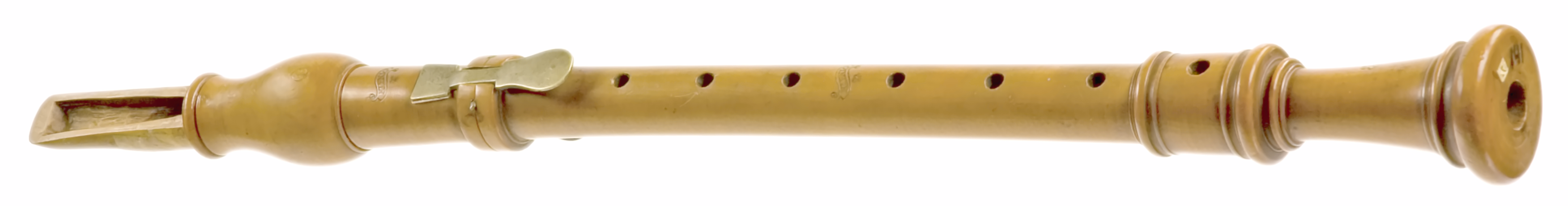
Chalumeau by Klenig (early 1700s), M141 Scenkonstmuseet, Stockholm. NB: There is no reed on this instrument.

== History ==
The range of chalumeaux including bass, tenor, alto, and soprano examples.

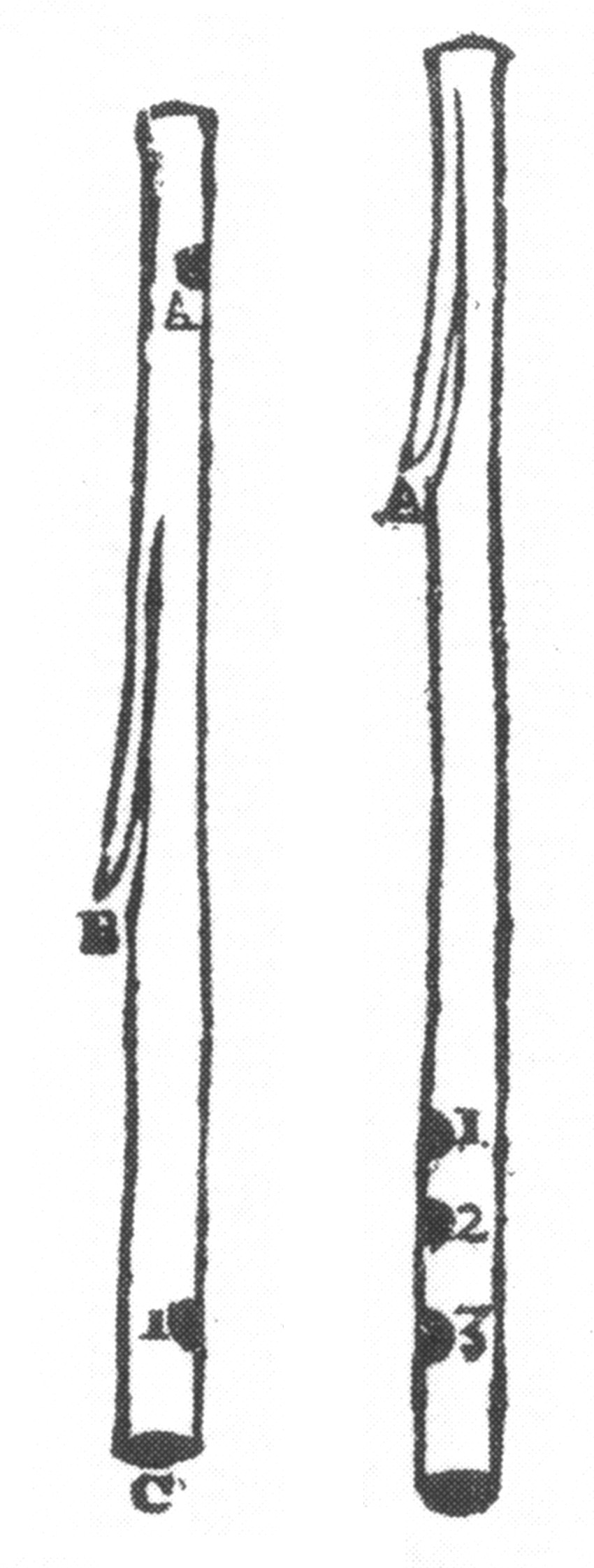
Chalumeau, illustrated in Marin Mersenne's Dictionary of 1636. These are stalks of wheat with attached (idioglott) reeds and fingerholes in the plant's stem.

The word chalumeau first begins to appear in writing during the 1630s, but may have been in use as early as the twelfth century. Several French dictionaries in the sixteenth century use the word to refer to various types of simple, idioglot reed-pipes all with tone holes. The heteroglot style reed (detached from the reed-plant's sidewall) was later adopted in the seventeenth and into the eighteenth centuries. These single-pipe instruments probably evolved from earlier multiple-pipe instruments through the abandonment of the drone tube. (See Similar instruments, below. The etymology is discussed in detail at Shawm#Etymology.)

The use of the chalumeau originated in France and later spread to Germany by the late seventeenth century. By 1700, the chalumeau was an established instrument on the European musical scene. Around this time, well-known Nuremberg instrument maker Johann Christoph (J.C.) Denner made improvements to the chalumeau, eventually developing it into the Baroque clarinet. The chalumeau is distinguished by two keys (thought to be added by Denner), which cover tone holes drilled diametrically to each other. The position of these tone holes prohibits the instrument from overblowing, limiting its range to only twelve notes. In order to counteract the limited range, multiple sizes of chalumeau were produced ranging from bass to soprano.

Over a period of about 20 years, the clarinet became distinguishable from the chalumeau due to a number of structural improvements. The first and most important development was the displacement of the rear key up towards the mouthpiece. Denner also reduced the size of the hole and inserted a small tube to facilitate overblowing, greatly increasing the range of the instrument to nearly three octaves. The instrument was also lengthened to increase accuracy of tuning, the recorder-like foot joint of the chalumeau was replaced by a bell similar to the oboe, and a key on the lower joint was eventually added to sound a b’. This new instrument eventually became the Baroque clarinet and specialized in the higher clarino register, as opposed to the lower chalumeau register. In its early development, the clarinet could not be tuned across the range of the instrument, so the chalumeau was still used for music in the lower range. Later developments in the key work allowed better intonation throughout the range of the clarinet, and the chalumeau register on the clarinet eventually rendered the chalumeau itself superfluous. The limited range and modest strength of sound compared with the clarinet made the chalumeau increasingly impractical. By 1800, the chalumeau had disappeared from the repertoire entirely and the clarinet was well-established on the European musical scene.

These improvements are attributed to J.C. Denner, but may have also been an invention of his son Jacob Denner who was trained by his father. Another son, Johann David, also was an instrument builder who succeeded his father in his workshop in 1607, and appears to have continued using J.C. Denner's maker's stamp; an extant tenor chalumeau made circa 1730 is attributed to him. The Denners were among the few instrument builders known to produce both chalumeaux and clarinets. Another was Philip Borkens of Amsterdam.

== Music for the chalumeau ==
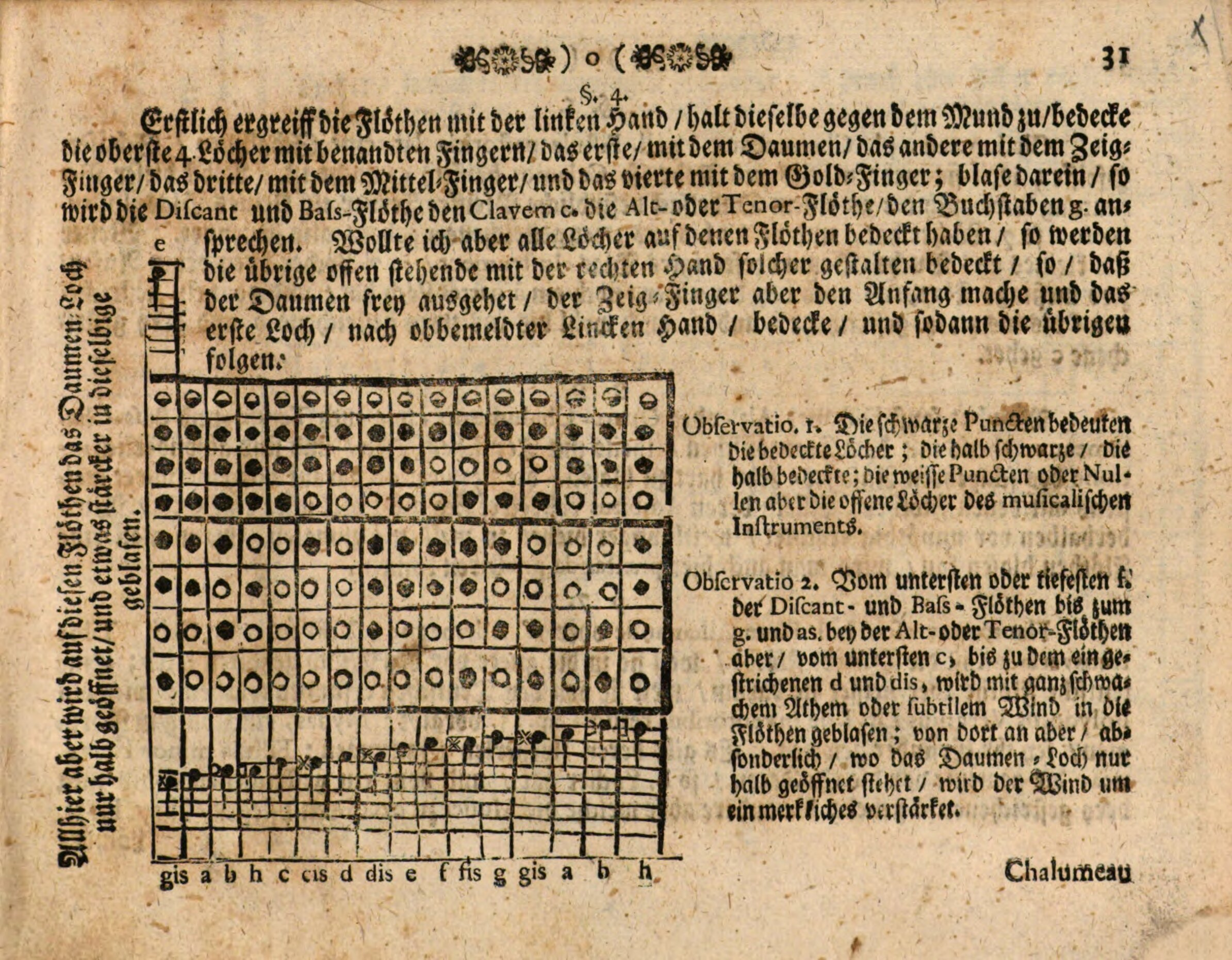
Fingering chart for the upper register of a keyless chalumeau, from Museum musicum theoreticalo practicum, 1732.

Composers initially favored the chalumeau, but the clarinet soon overtook it in repertoire and ubiquity. Estienne Roger in Amsterdam published a set of duets for two chalumeaux in 1706 (prior to the first duets for clarinet). And in 1716, the same publisher released six volumes of duets for chalumeaux. In the first decades of the eighteenth century, the chalumeau was especially popular in the Habsburg court, as evidenced by chalumeau parts in over forty operas and oratorios, and the Denners had many orders for chalumeaux from royalty all over Europe. Composers Fux, the Bononcini brothers, Zelenka, de Rossi, Vivaldi, Telemann and Hasse wrote for the chalumeau but chalumeau parts were not common in the second half of the century. Graupner wrote extensively for all sizes of chalumeaux and featured the instrument, often in groups of two or three, in numerous Ouverture-Suites, Concertos, Church Cantatas and Trio Sonatas. During the brief revival of chalumeau after 1760, Florian Gassmann included a chalumeau part in two pieces, and chalumeau parts were included in several ballets in the 1770s. But later renditions of these pieces transposed the chalumeau parts to clarinet or flute. The chalumeau was often included in music dictionaries until the early nineteenth century.

== Timbre and tone ==
The chalumeau sounds much lower than one might expect, due to the acoustical nature of a cylindrical stopped pipe. It has an intimate, cantabile-like quality – as opposed to the trumpet-like sound of the Baroque clarinet – and is very similar to the sound of speaking.

== Historical and modern chalumeaux ==
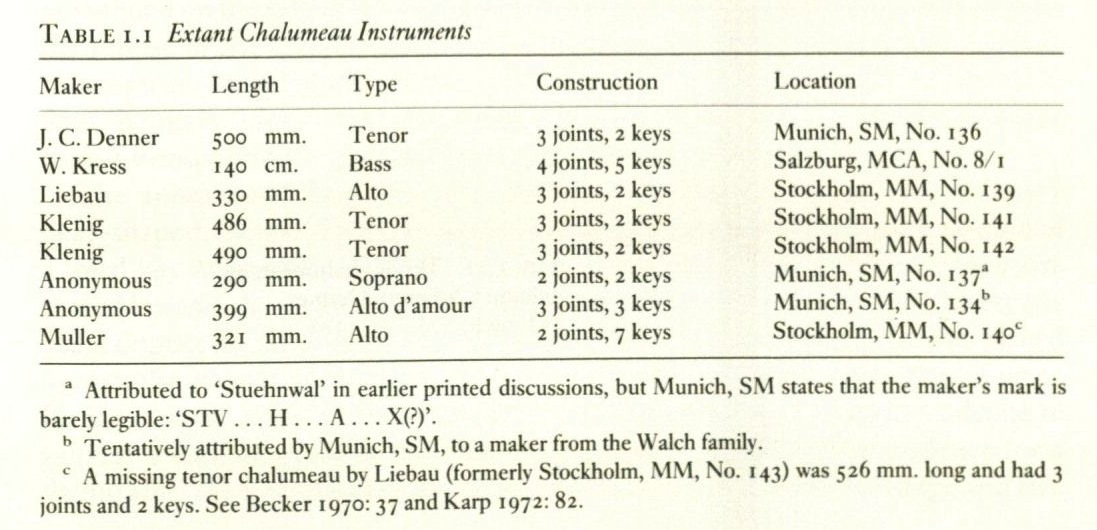
Chart of the eight historical chalumeaux that are still in existence today.

About ten original chalumeaux are extant, but modern craftsmen produce replicas based on these original instruments. Of the original instruments, most are made of boxwood and all feature two keys placed opposite each other to be played by the thumb and first finger of the left hand. The mouthpieces of these instruments usually have the reed placed on top so that it vibrates against the upper lip when played. The surviving chalumeaux were made between the beginning of the eighteenth century and about 1740 by instrument makers including Johann David Denner (attributed, using J.C. Denner's stamp), W. Kress, Thomas and Mathias Stubenwoll (attributed), Johann Heinrich Eichentopf, Liebau, Klenig, and Johann Müller (attributed). Of these instruments, there is one soprano and one bass chalumeau, one basset soprano, several tenor and alto chalumeaux, and one rare alto d’amour (aka mezzo-soprano chalumeau). The alto d’amour has a bulbous bell like its rare contemporary the clarinet d'amore (aka "mezzo-soprano clarinet") and the modern-day English horn.

Present day makers of replica chalumeaux include Peter van der Poel, Andreas Schöni, R. Tutz, François Masson, and Guntram Wolf. Other makers, including Tupian, Hahl, and Kunath, produce modern adaptations of the chalumeau.

== Similar instruments ==
Similar single-reed folk instruments with single, cylindrical tubes are found in many Arabic and European cultures throughout history. Examples include the albogue, alboka, diplica, hornpipe, pibgorn, and sipsi.

In England, by 1698 a similar instrument was known as the mock trumpet. The mock trumpet predated the chalumeau and may be one of the primary predecessors of both the chalumeau and clarinet.

A similar instrument called the xaphoon (also called "Maui bamboo sax" or "pocket sax") was developed by Hawaiian craftsman Brian Wittman, though the Xaphoon uses a tenor sax reed and the mouthpiece is round, rather than beaked like typical clarinet mouthpieces. A similar instrument called the venova was created and sold by Yamaha Corporation in 2017. The Shanrya company produces an instrument called the clarionet, which is basically a keyless chalemeau made from modern materials, which uses a standard clarinet mouthpiece.

== Notes ==
The name 'chalumeau' is used by European organ-builders to denote an eight-foot short-resonator organ stop used for color effects. This was first encountered in the organ of the Frauenkirche at Dresden and was built by celebrated organ builder Gottfried Silbermann between 1732 and 1736. Silbermann was so pleased with the sound of this new invention that he included it in most of his later organs.
