= Reed aerophone =

Class of musical instruments

Reed aerophones is one of the categories of musical instruments found in the Hornbostel-Sachs system of musical instrument classification. In order to produce sound with these aerophones, the player's breath is directed against a lamella or pair of lamellae which periodically interrupt the airflow and cause the air to be set in motion.

422 Reed aerophones

422.1 Double reed instruments - There are two lamellae which beat against one another.

422.11 (Single) oboes.

422.111 With cylindrical bore.

422.111.1 Without fingerholes.

422.111.2 With fingerholes.

- Duduk
- Piri

422.112 With conical bore.

- Bassoon
- Hne
- Oboe
  - Cor anglais
  - Oboe d'amore
  - Bagpipes
- Shawm
- Taepyeongso

422.12 Sets of oboes.

422.121 With cylindrical bore.
422.122 With conical bore.

422.2 Single reed instruments - The pipe has a single 'reed' consisting of a percussion lamella.

422.21 (Single) clarinets.

422.211 With cylindrical bore.

422.211.1 Without fingerholes.

422.211.2 With fingerholes.

- Albogue
- Alboka
- Arghul
- Chalumeau
- Clarinet
  - Piccolo (or sopranino, or octave) clarinet
  - Soprano clarinet (including E-flat clarinet)
  - Basset clarinet
  - Clarinette d'amour
  - Basset horn
  - Alto clarinet
  - Bass clarinet
  - Contra-alto clarinet
  - Contrabass clarinet
  - Octocontra-alto clarinet
  - Octocontrabass clarinet
- Diplica
- Hornpipe
- Pibgorn
- Saxonette
- Sipsi
- Xaphoon
- Zhaleika

422.212 With conical bore.

422.21.1 Without fingerholes

- Sneng (end-blown version)

422.21.2 With fingerholes

- Heckel-clarina
- Heckelphone-clarinet
- Octavin
- Saxophone
  - Soprillo
  - Sopranino saxophone
  - Soprano saxophone
  - Mezzo-soprano saxophone
  - Alto saxophone
  - Tenor saxophone
  - C melody saxophone
  - Baritone saxophone
  - Bass saxophone
  - Contrabass saxophone
  - Subcontrabass saxophone
  - Tubax
- Sneng (side blown version)
- Tárogató (after 1890)

422.22 Sets of clarinets.

- Aulochrome
- Double clarinet
- Launeddas
- Mijwiz

422.3 Reedpipes with free reeds - The reed vibrates through [at] a closely fitted frame. There must be fingerholes, otherwise the instrument belongs to the free reeds 412.13.

422.31 Single pipes with free reed.

- Bawu

422.32 Double pipes with free reeds.

- Hulusi
