= Bülban =

Historical musical instrument

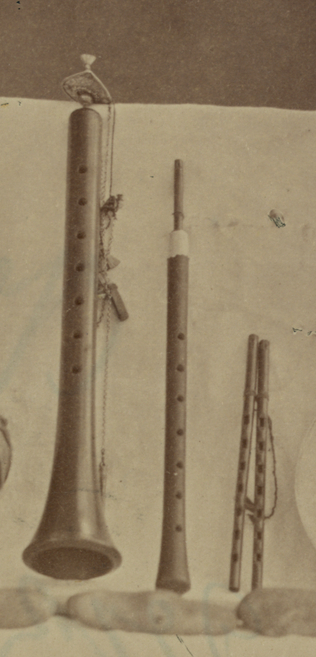
- From left: zurna, bülban, and koşnai, Russian Turkestan 1865 to 1872. Tubular reed split from top downward.

Woodwind instrument
- Classification: aerophone
- Hornbostel–Sachs classification: 422.211.2 (single-reed aerophone with cylindrical bore and fingerholes)

Related instruments
- arghul, clarinet, diplica, dili tuiduk, dozaleh, cifte, fadno, launeddas, mijwiz, mock trumpet, pilili, Reclam de xeremies, sipsi, zammara, zummara

The bülban is a historical musical instrument from the Caucasus, Middle East and Central Asia. It was a reed pipe, with an apricot wood body and tipped with a tubular single-reed. It had 7 fingerholes and a thumbhole and played a diatonic scale from E♭1 to E♭3. By half-covering fingerholes, it could play a chromatic scale. The instrument has been documented in Azerbaijan, and one can be seen in a photo from the mid-19th-century Russian Turkestan.

The body of the bülban is about 280 mm long. The reed's diameter is 5mm wide. The bore of the instrument is very narrow, and the bell at the bottom has a small hole for the air to flow through.

The instrument is very similar to the Georgian pilili, with the same style of reed tip, though the Georgian instrument now uses bamboo. The reed tip is the same as the sümsü (or sipsi) and tulum (an Azerbaijani bagpipe). Other instruments using these tips include the dili tuiduk reed pipe and the ghoshmeh.

The instrument declined in Azerbaijan in the 15th century and is nearly forgotten. However, in a period of cultural recovery, the instrument has received some attention by being documented.

The instrument is still played, according to a 2004 source, in Khorezm, Uzbekistan, where it is called bulaman, balaman or balaban. That last name, balaban, is more widely used however for another kind of double-reed instrument.

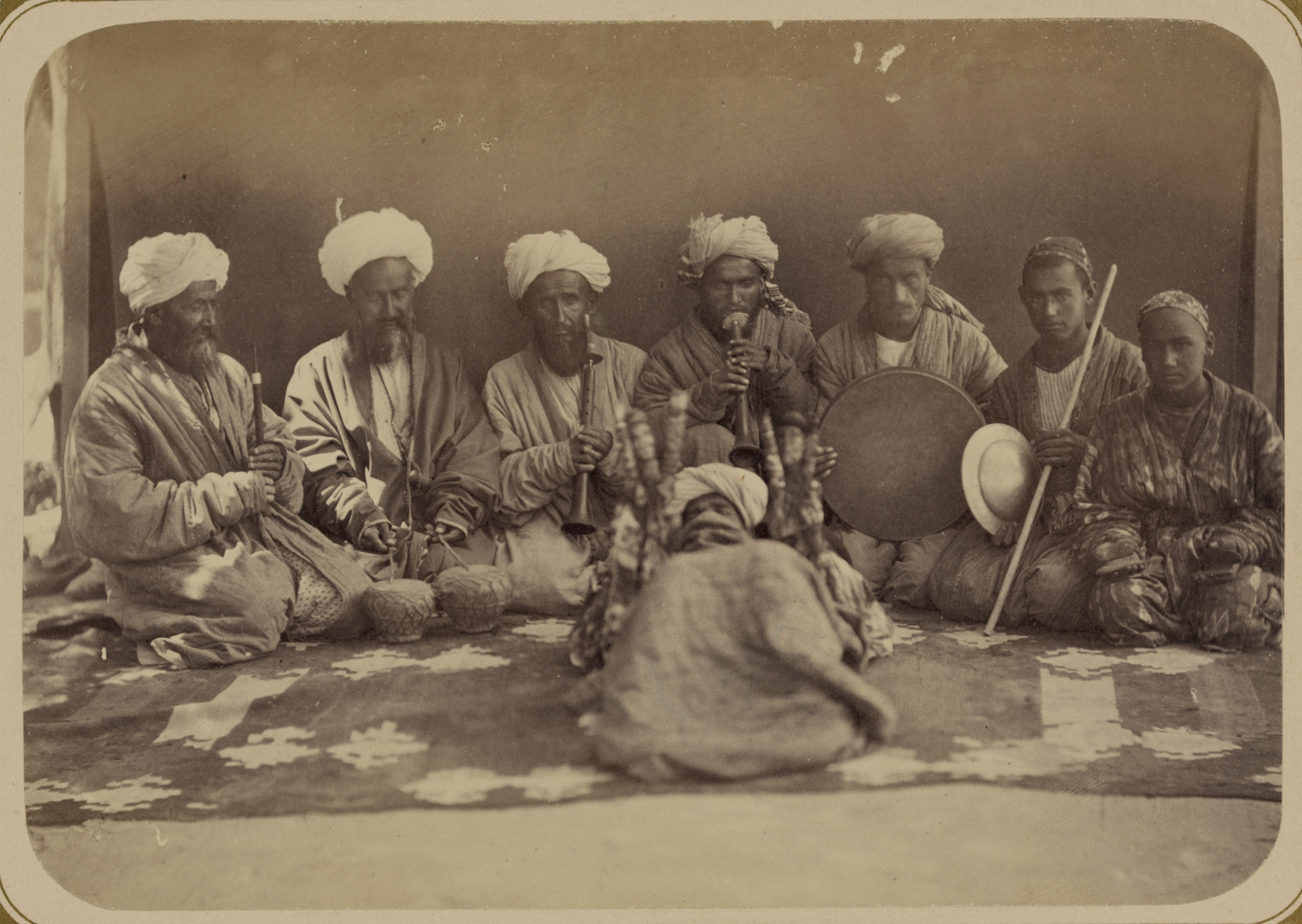
Musicians from Russian Turkestan. Instruments from the left bülban, nagara drums, 2 zurnas, daf, sanj, qairaqs.

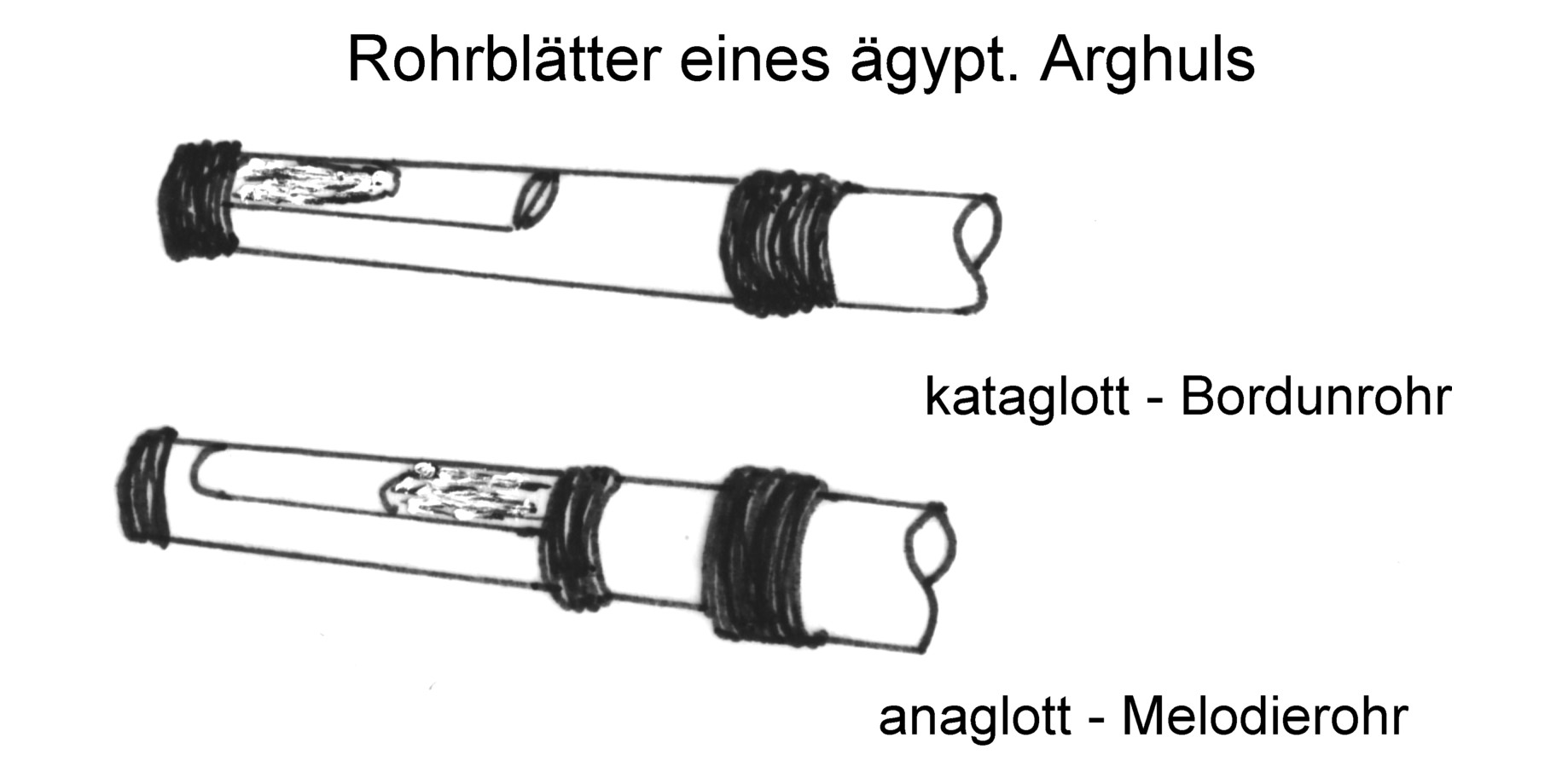
Drawings of Tubular single reeds. Tubular body is the same style as used in bülban. Reeds above split from middle upward and from top downward.

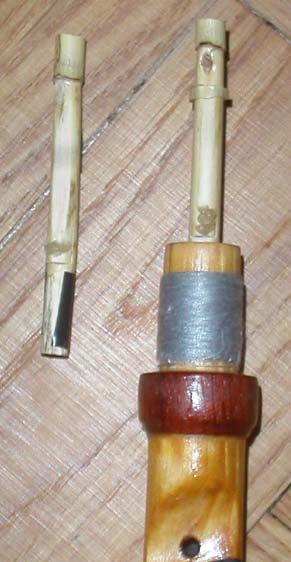
Tubular single reed from a Swedish bagpipe.

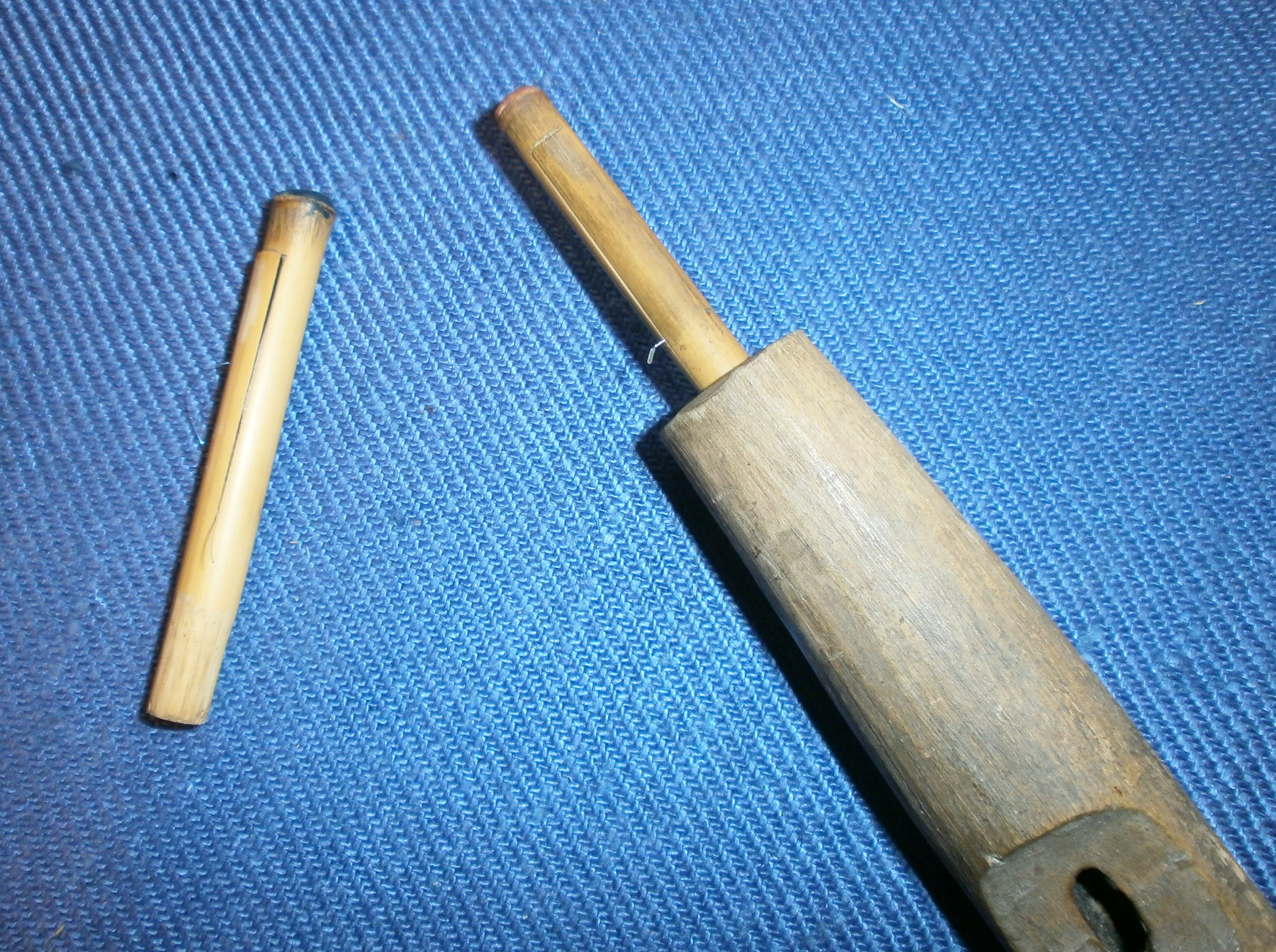
Tubular single reeds from a Swedish bagpipe. Similar to the reed in the bülban

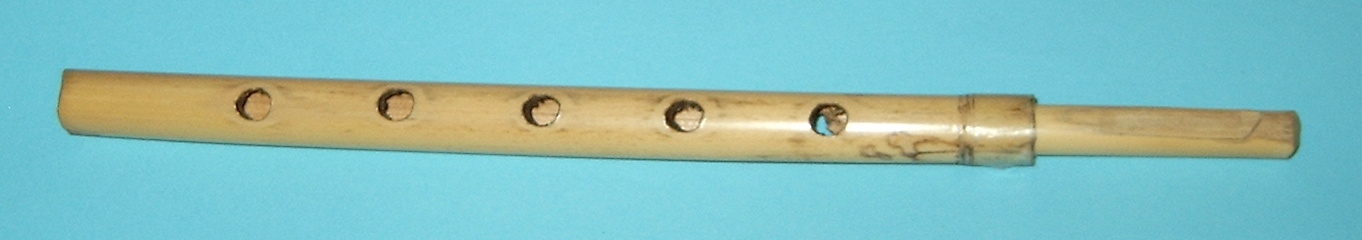
Sipsi reed pipe. Tubular single-reed is split from top downward.
