= Mr. Charles =

Mr. Charles, also known as Monsieur Charle and Charles the Hungarian (fl. 1734–1755) was a travelling musician known for his performance tours of England with his wife and son. He also performed at the Smock Alley Theatre in Dublin, where an account of a 1742 performance is preserved in the Dublin Mercury showing that he performed several works by Handel as well as works by Hasse and others, including some composed by Charles himself. His identity is uncertain. Variously reported to be of French or Hungarian origin, he has been tentatively identified as Charles (or Carlo) Vernsberg, a horn player who was a member of the Royal Society of Musicians.

Charles first appeared in London in 1734. He performed on the French horn, clarinet, and chalumeau. He is considered one of the first clarinetists to perform in the UK. In addition to performing, Charles taught music in London and Dublin and worked as a theatre impresario in Bristol.

Charles was also a composer although few of his works survive. Twelve of his duos for French Horns are preserved in a 1754 publication called Apollo’s Cabinet, or the Muses Delight.

His last known concert was in 1755.
