= Dilli tuiduk =

Turkmen musical instrument

Woodwind instrument
- Other names: Dilli düdük, Dilli tuyduk, dili tüidük, dilli tüidük, dili tuiduk
- Classification: single-reed aerophone
- Hornbostel–Sachs classification: 422.211.2 (single reed instrument with cylindrical bore and fingerholes)

Related instruments
- arghul, bülban, clarinet, diplica, dozaleh, cifte, launeddas, mijwiz, pilili, sipsi, zammara, zummara

The dilli tuiduk is a Turkmen musical instrument in the clarinet-family that uses a single reed to produce the instrument's sound. It is used mainly in Turkmen folk music.

The woodwind instrument is also transcribed dilli düdük, dilli tuyduk , dili tüidük, dilli tüidük, dili tuiduk, and дилли туйдук.

== Construction ==
The instrument has a body made from the stem of a bulrush, and a reed cut into the tube at the top (a split that forms a flexible edge that vibrates when blown).

A variant was photographed (bülban) in 1869–1872, in which the bulrush body has been replaced by a carved wooden body. The split reed was retained as a tip, the same style of mouthpiece as on the ghoshmeh.

Dilli-tuiduk come in two kinds. In one, the reed end of the instrument is closed and in the other it is open. A reed is cut in the upper part of the pipe and 3 or 4 finger holes are cut on the upper part, at intervals of some 5-6mm. Its range is a 6th or 7th, from about fa in the first octave to re or mi in the second. Some sounds have to be made by overblowing or by partly exposing the finger holes. The dilli-tuiduk makes a penetrating sound and is used to play tunes of Turkmen folk songs. Versions of song tunes in the form of ditties for the dilli-tuiduk start in a long drawn-out sound going into the main melody.

== See also ==
- Sipsi, related instrument
