= Diplica =

Balkan single-reed instrument

- Diplica

Woodwind instrument
- Classification: single-reed aerophone
- Hornbostel–Sachs classification: 422.211.2 (single reed instrument with cylindrical bore and fingerholes)

Related instruments
- arghul, bülban, clarinet, dili tuiduk, dozaleh, cifte, launeddas, mijwiz, pilili, sipsi, zammara, zummara

Diplica or diplice is a single-reed instrument from the Balkans, which has been playing in different forms through many parts of Croatia, but now survives mainly in the Baranya region.

Diplicas are double clarinets. The widespread practice of playing wind instruments in pairs led to the development of the double, or even triple or quadruple, clarinets. Most were double clarinets, with two tubes of reed firmly tied or glued together in a parallel position where one of the tubes functions as a drone. Instruments of this kind can be traced back to approximately 2700 BCE in Egypt, where they were originally called ‘memet’. During the Old Kingdom in Egypt (2778-2723 BCE), memets were depicted on the reliefs of seven tombs at Saqqarra, six tombs at Giza, and the pyramids of Queen Khentkaus. Double-clarinets are particularly important in Arab countries, but have spread throughout the Mediterranean region, India, Sardinia, and South America.

The diplica has a traditional mouth horn that holds an idioglot reed and two pipes carved from one piece of wood. The pipe has a few (usually five) finger holes drilled into it. It is usually in the key of E, although it can be made in C, D, or F.

== Sources ==
- "Diplica" — Croatian Traditional Instruments by Stjepan Večković
