= Pilili =

Reed wind instrument

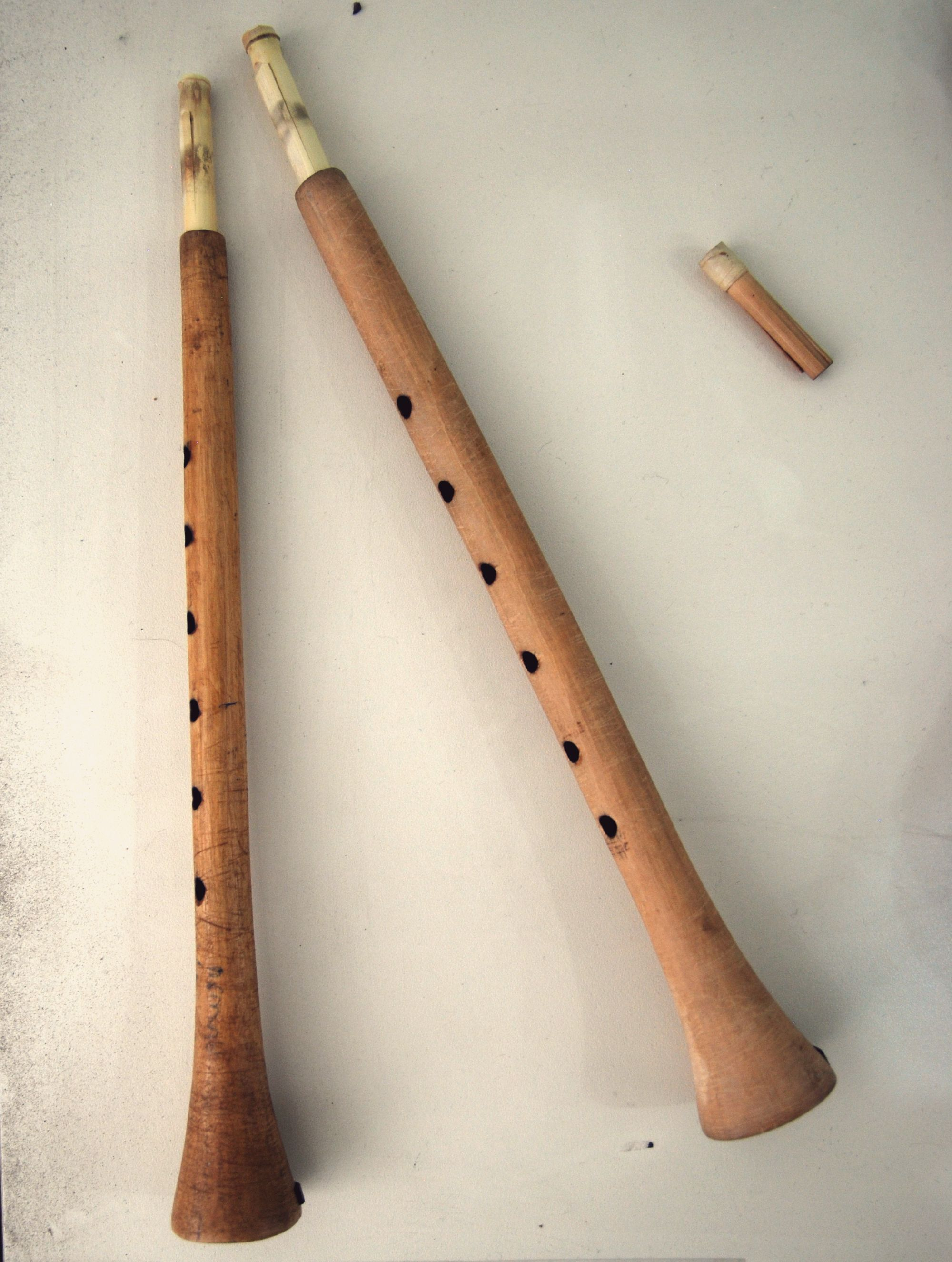
- Pilili

Woodwind instrument
- Classification: single-reed aerophone
- Hornbostel–Sachs classification: 422.211.2 (single reed instrument with cylindrical bore and fingerholes)

Related instruments
- arghul, bülban, clarinet, diplica, dili tuiduk, dozaleh, cifte, launeddas, mijwiz, sipsi, zammara, zummara

Pilili is a reed wind instrument in Adjara, west Georgia. It is a pipe of 25-30cm in length with 5-7 keys.

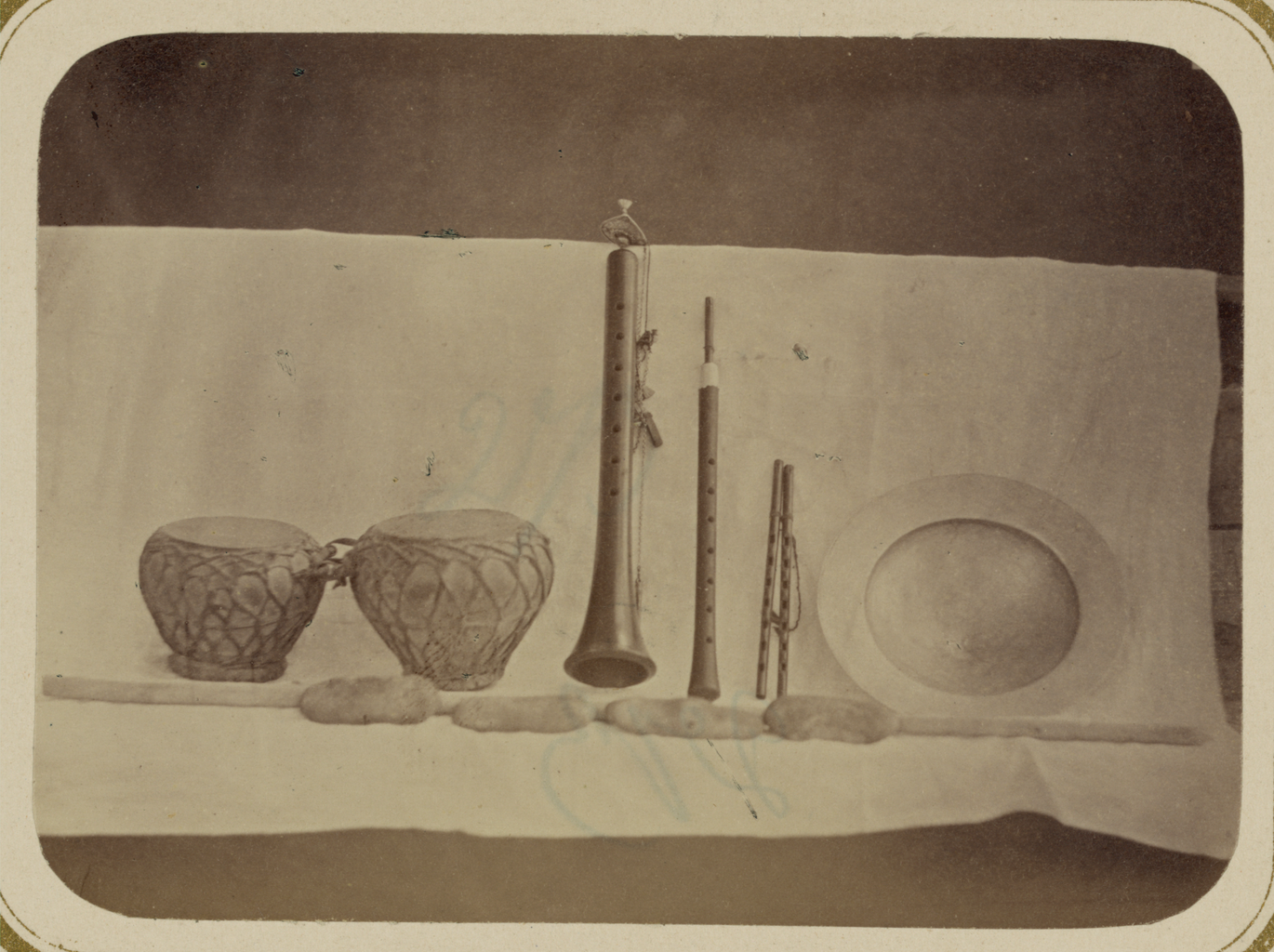
Instruments from Russian Turkestan, 1869-1872...from left: nagaras, sorna, bülban, ghoshmeh, tas. The unknown reed-tipped pipe bears close resemblance to the Pilili.

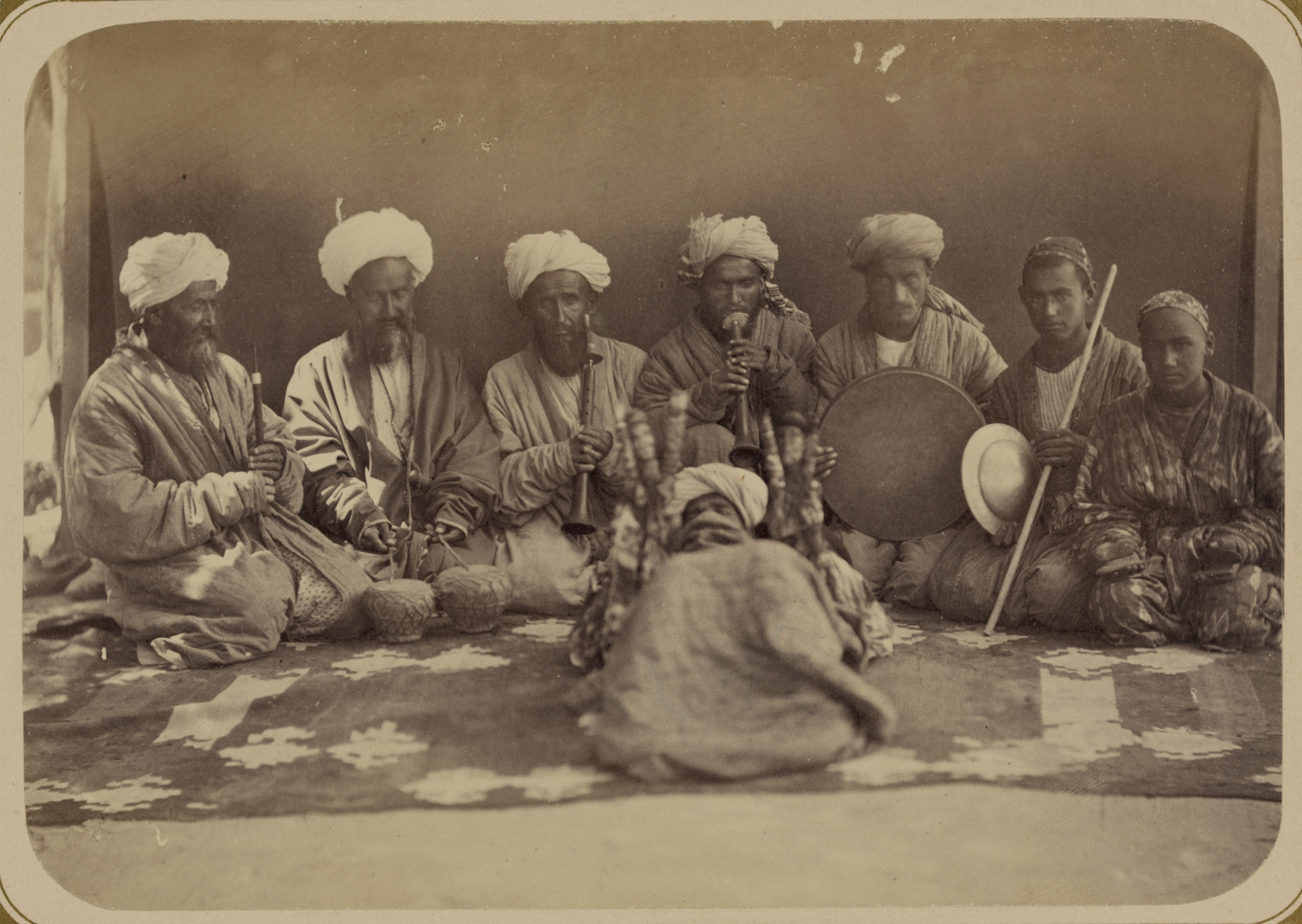
Troop of Tajik or Uzbek musicians from Russian Turkestan. Musician on far left has pilili-like instrument.

== Description ==
The main parts of the pilili are the trunk and the mouthpiece. The stem or trunk is a tube about 25-30 cm long, on which 5-7 holes are made. The mouthpiece is a small tube, the length of which depends on the desired sound. It has a split in its sidewall, creating a reed that makes sound when a musician blows through the top tip.

The stem of the pilili is made from Tkemli (Prunus cerasifera plum tree) or Didgula (Sambucus nigra) wood. In ancient times, tsipil (the tip) was also made from didgula wood, but today is made from bamboo. The tone of the pilili is diatonic, and it has a chromatic range of one octave.

== See also ==
- Sipsi
