= Arghul =

Traditional Middle Eastern woodwind instrument

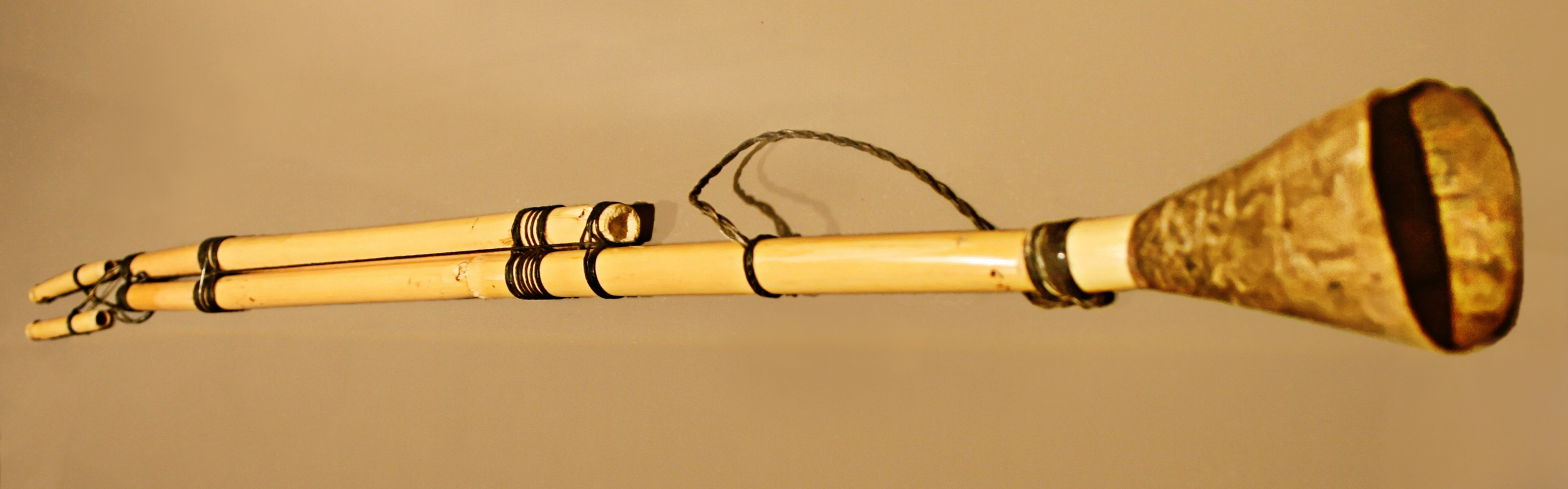
- Arghul with bell attached.

Woodwind instrument
- Classification: single-reed aerophone
- Hornbostel–Sachs classification: 422.211.2 (single reed instrument with cylindrical bore and fingerholes)

Related instruments
- bülban, clarinet, diplica, dili tuiduk, dozaleh, cifte, launeddas, mijwiz, pilili, Reclam de xeremies, sipsi, zammara, zummara

The arghul (Arabic: أرغول or يرغول), also spelled argul, arghoul, arghool, argol, or yarghul, is a musical instrument in the reed family. It has been used since ancient Egyptian and Ancient Levantine civilizations(such as the Canaanites) times and is still used as a traditional instrument in Egypt, Palestine, Syria, Lebanon and Jordan.

== Basic characteristics ==
(From Edward William Lane's An Account of the Manners and Customs of the Modern Egyptians.)
Modern Arghul, 3 ft. 2½ in. long.

The arghul is a double-pipe, Single-reed woodwind instrument that consists of two tubes: a melody pipe with between five and seven holes and a longer drone (Arabic ardiyya, "ground") pipe. Its tone is similar to that of a clarinet, although a bit more reed-like. Unlike the similar mijwiz, the arghul has fingering holes on only one of the instrument's pipes (the melody pipe), and the drone pipe has a detachable length that allows the player to alter the pitch of the drone.

In the illustration above all three lengths are shown in use. An arghul belonging to the collection of the Conservatoire Royal at Brussels, described by Victor Mahillon in his catalogue (No. 113), gives the following scale: —

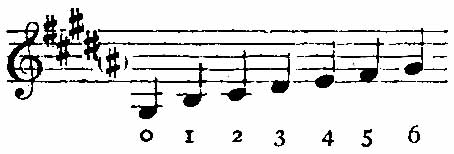
Short Pipe.	Drone Pipe.
Holes uncovered.	Without additional joint. / With shortest additional joint. / With shortest and medium additional joints. / With longest additional joint.

Arghuls are used in Egypt, Palestine and Levantine nations as an accompaniment to belly dancing, Dabke, and other types of Arabic musical performances. Circular breathing is an important part of the playing of the instrument.

There are three varieties of arghuls: the small arghul (arghoul alasghar), the medium arghul (arghoul alsoghayr), and the large arghul (arghoul alkebir).

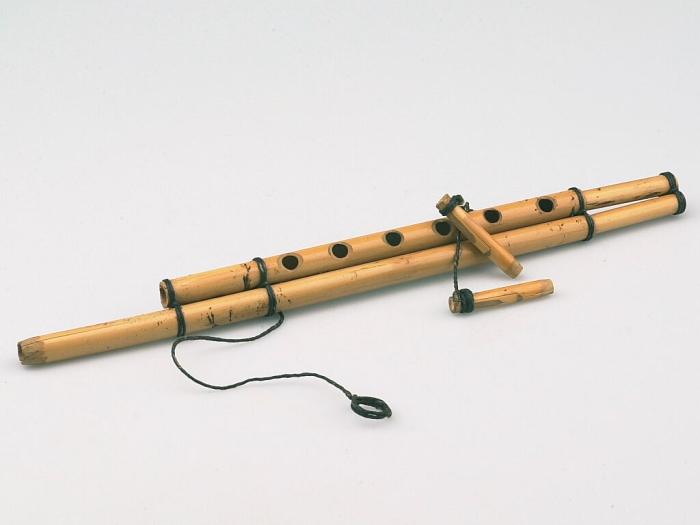
Egyptian arghul collected before 1939 in the Wereld Museum in Belgium.

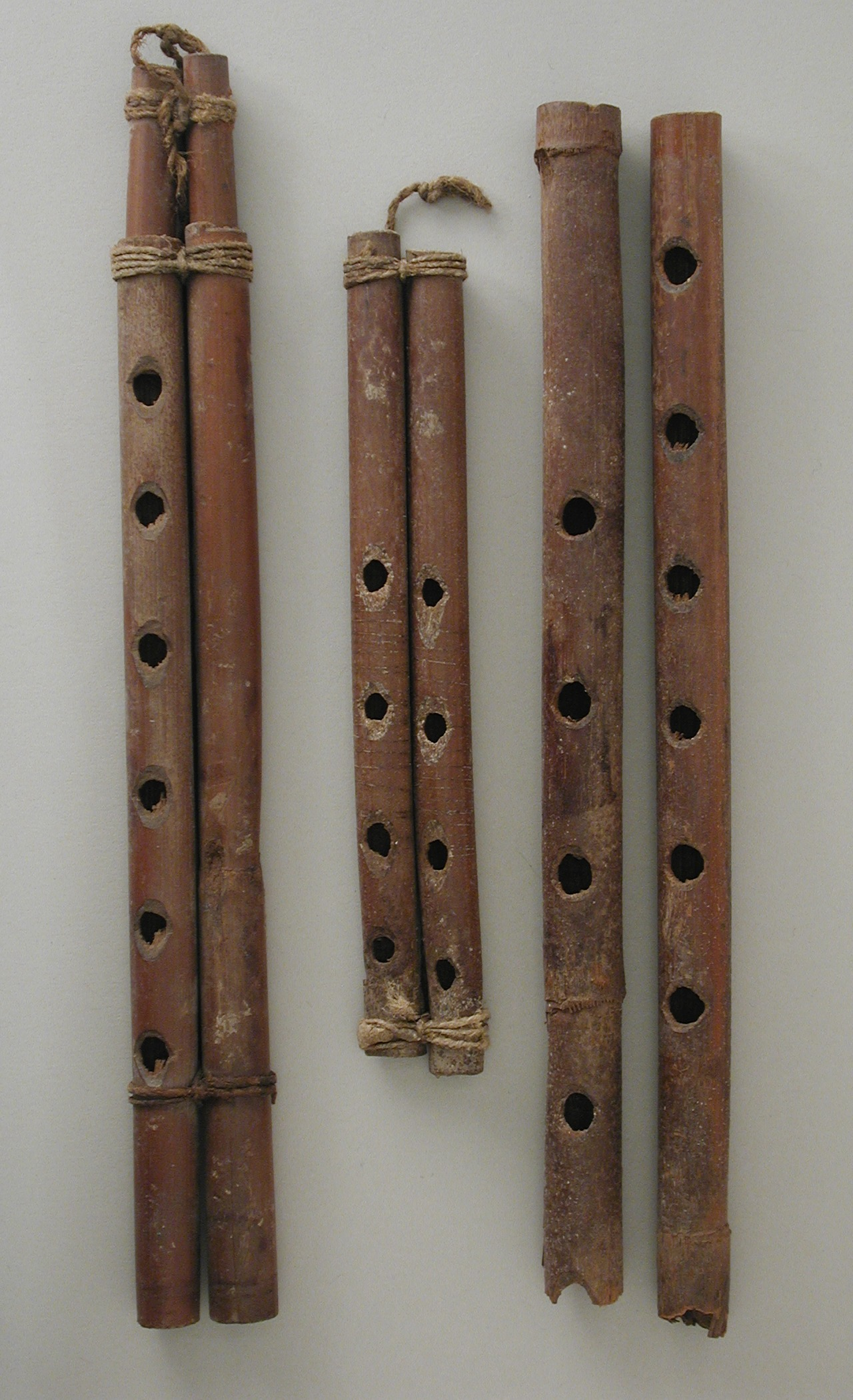
Egypt 1537 - 31 BCE. Instrument from ancient Egypt found in a tomb.

== Çifte ==
Çifte is a Turkish folk instrument of the wind type. It is made by tying two reed pipes side by side. Two small reed pieces which produce the sound are added to the ends of both reeds. These two small reeds are taken into the mouth cavity and it is played by blowing the air into both at the same time.

There are two çifte types known as Demli Çifte and Demsiz Çifte. In demli çifte one of the reeds does not have any pitch keys and it just produces a drone. There are melody keys on the other reed and the main melody is played through them.

Çifte is also known as Argun, Argul, Kargın or Zambır at different regions.

In Turkish, the word "çifte" also refers to a double-barreled shotgun, no doubt because of the barrels' resemblance to the wind instrument.

== Dozaleh ==
See main article: Dozaleh

The dozaleh is one of the old folk wind instruments of Iran which is used in mirth celebrations. Abu Nasr Farabi had called it Mezmarol-Mosana or Mozdavadg [mozdavej] ("married"). The dozaleh has a sound like Ney-anbān [neianbAn] (bagpipe), but to some extent more clear and lower. It is played in Khorasan [xorAsAn], Kermanshah [KermAnSAh], and mostly in Iran. In some different dialects it is called Zanbooreh [zanbureh].

== See also ==
- Aulos
- Launeddas
- Mijwiz
