= Sipsi =

Woodwind musical instrument

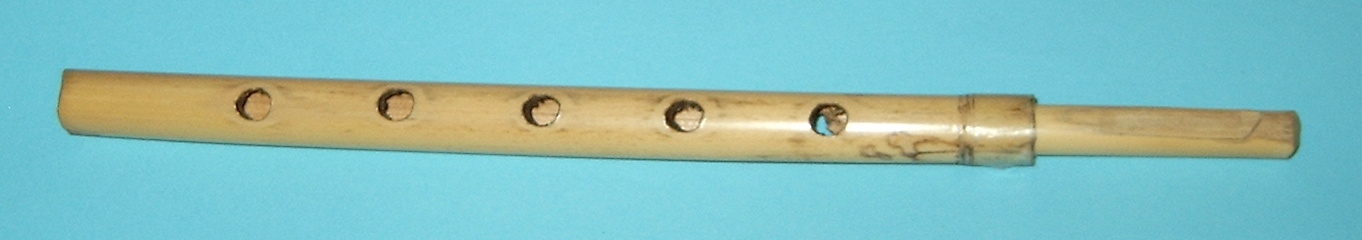
- Sipsi made of bamboo

Woodwind instrument
- Classification: single-reed aerophone
- Hornbostel–Sachs classification: 422.211.2 (single-reed instrument with cylindrical bore and fingerholes)

Playing range
- 1.5 octaves

Related instruments
- arghul, bülban, clarinet, diplica, dili tuiduk, dozaleh, cifte, launeddas, mijwiz, pilili, zammara, zummara

Musicians
- Hüseyin DEMİR, Ali Teken, Hayri Dev

The sipsi (pronounced [sipˈsi]) is a clarinet-like, single-reed instrument used mainly in folk music and native to the Aegean region of Turkey. The word sipsi is possibly onomatopoeic. The sipsi can be made of bone, wood, or reed, though the reed variant is most common. Its size varies from region to region, but it generally contains five finger holes in the front, and one finger hole in the back.

The sipsi is one of many reed instruments in Turkey used to play lead melodies in instrumental folk music. It is generally played in the Western part in the Aegean Region of Turkey. Most folk tunes played in this area with the sipsi are in 9/8 time.

== Playing ==
The timbre of the sipsi is similar to that of the Irish bagpipe. Players of the sipsi employ the circular breathing method, in which air is breathed through the nose while it is being pumped out of stored air in the cheeks. This breathing method is used to form an uninterrupted sound.

To tune the sipsi, one must wrap a thread around the bottom of the reed, which is placed into the main body of the instrument. Adjusting the reed with the string is the way to tune. The instrument's range is greater than its six finger holes would suggest, the upper registers can be attained by particular approach to breathing.

== See also ==
- Clarinet
- Diplica
- Dili tuiduk
- Turkish folk music
