= Launeddas =

Sardinian woodwind instrument made of three pipes

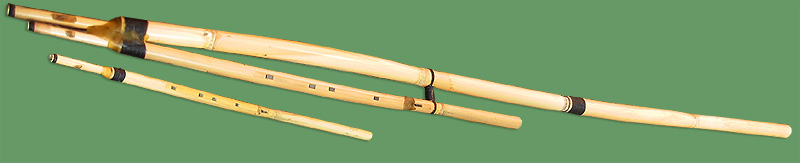

Woodwind instrument
- Classification: Single-reed aerophone
- Hornbostel–Sachs classification: 422.211.2 (single reed instrument with cylindrical bore and fingerholes)

Related instruments
- Arghul, bülban, clarinet, diplica, dili tuiduk, dozaleh, cifte, mijwiz, pilili, sipsi, triple pipes, zammara, zummara

The launeddas (also called Sardinian triple clarinet) are a traditional Sardinian woodwind instrument made of three pipes, each of which has an idioglot single reed. They are a polyphonic instrument, with one of the pipes functioning as a drone and the other two playing the melody in thirds and sixths.

Predecessors of the launeddas are found throughout Northern Africa and the Middle East. In 2700 BCE, the Egyptian reed pipes were originally called "memet"; during the Old Kingdom of Egypt (2778–2723 BCE), memets were depicted on the reliefs of seven tombs at Saqqara, six tombs at Giza, and the pyramids of Queen Khentkaus.

The Sardinian launeddas themselves are an ancient instrument, being traced back to at least the eighth century BCE, as is testified during the Nuragic civilization by an ithyphallic bronze statuette found in Ittiri. The launeddas are still played today during religious ceremonies and dances (su ballu in Sardinian language). Distinctively, they are played using extensive variations on a few melodic phrases, and a single piece can last over an hour, producing some of the "most elemental and resonant (sounds) in European music".

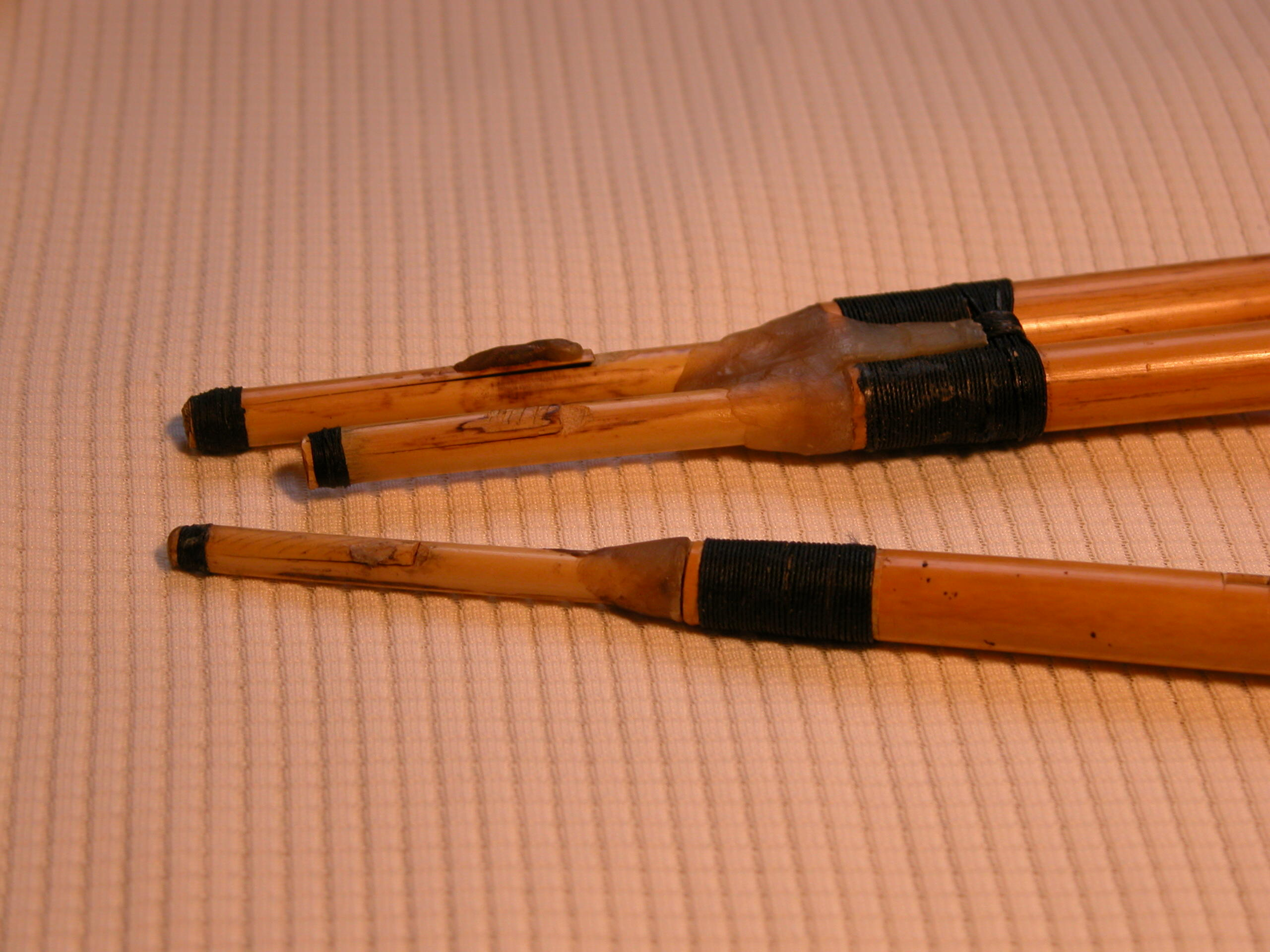
Closeup of the reeds of the launeddas

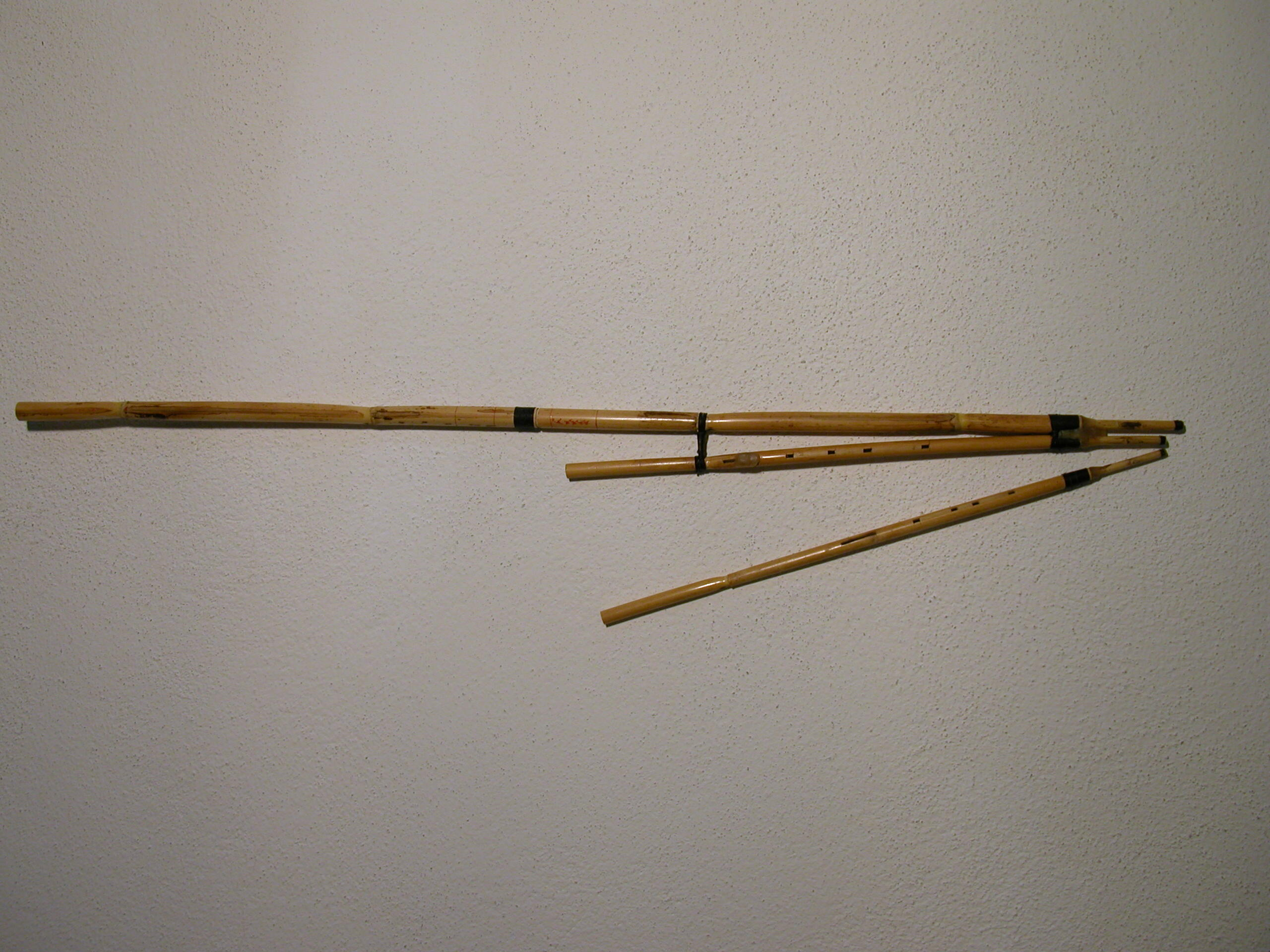
Laundedas separated for the left and right hands

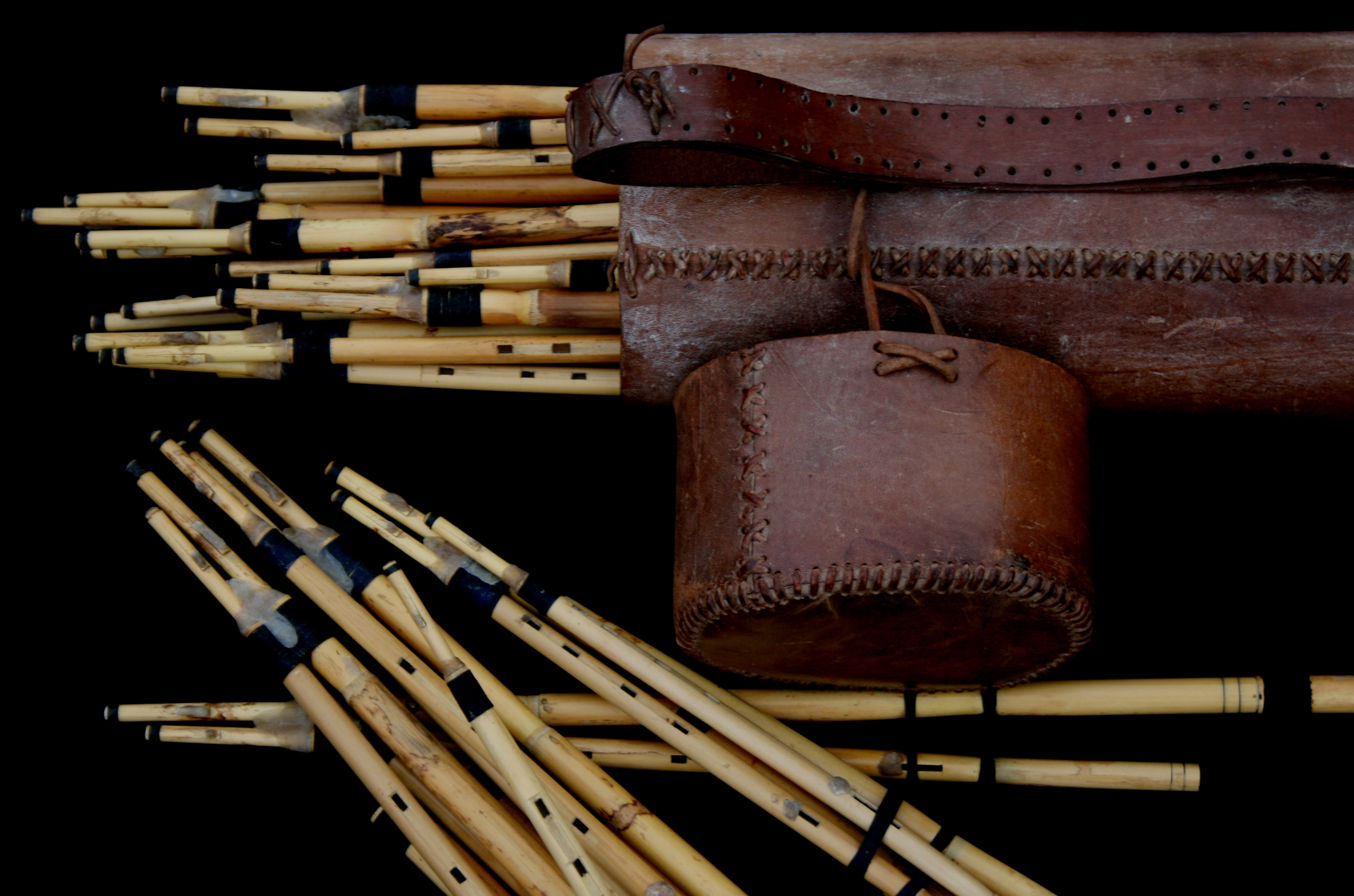
A variety of launeddas

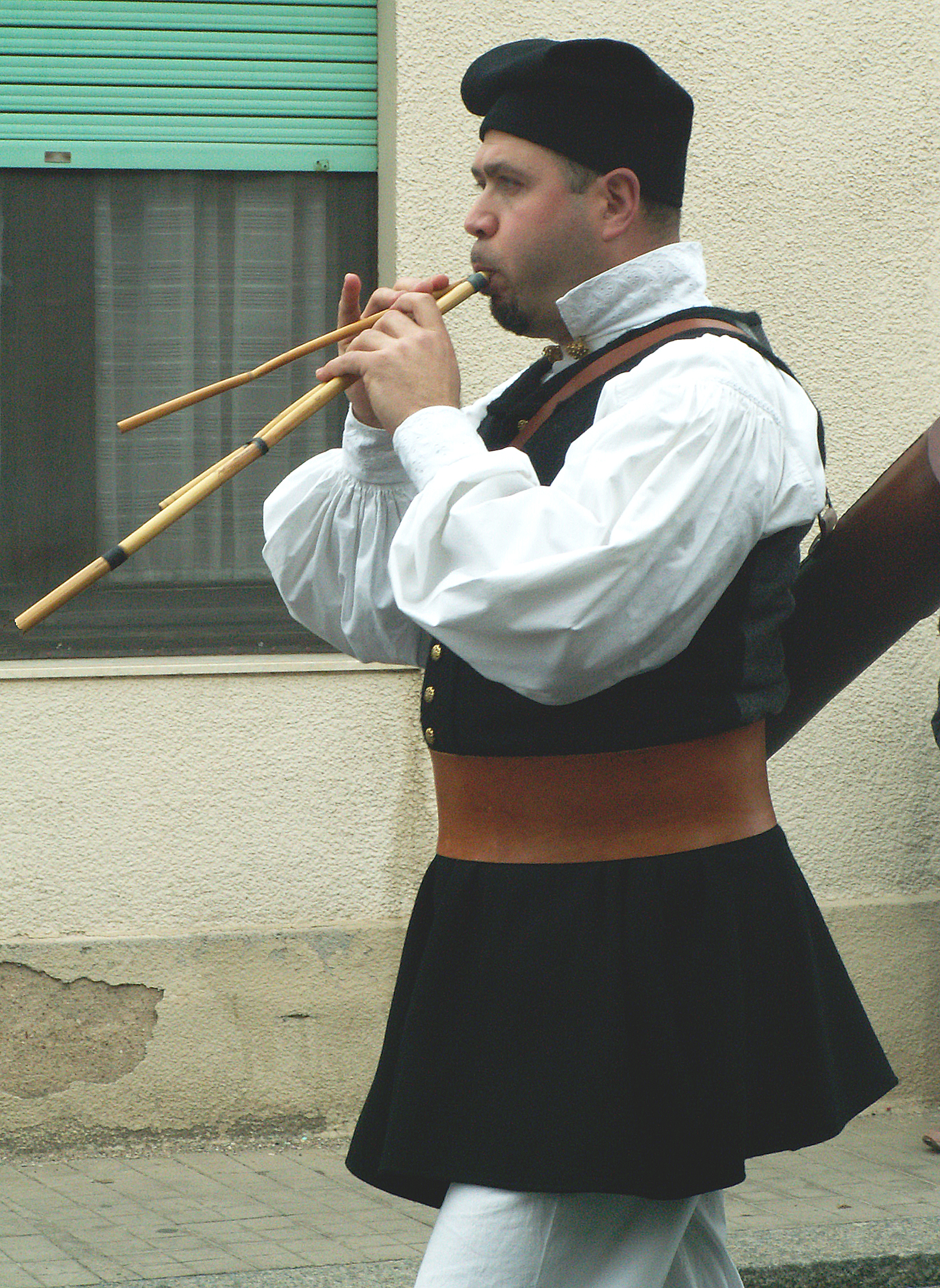
A Sardinian man in traditional clothing playing the launeddas

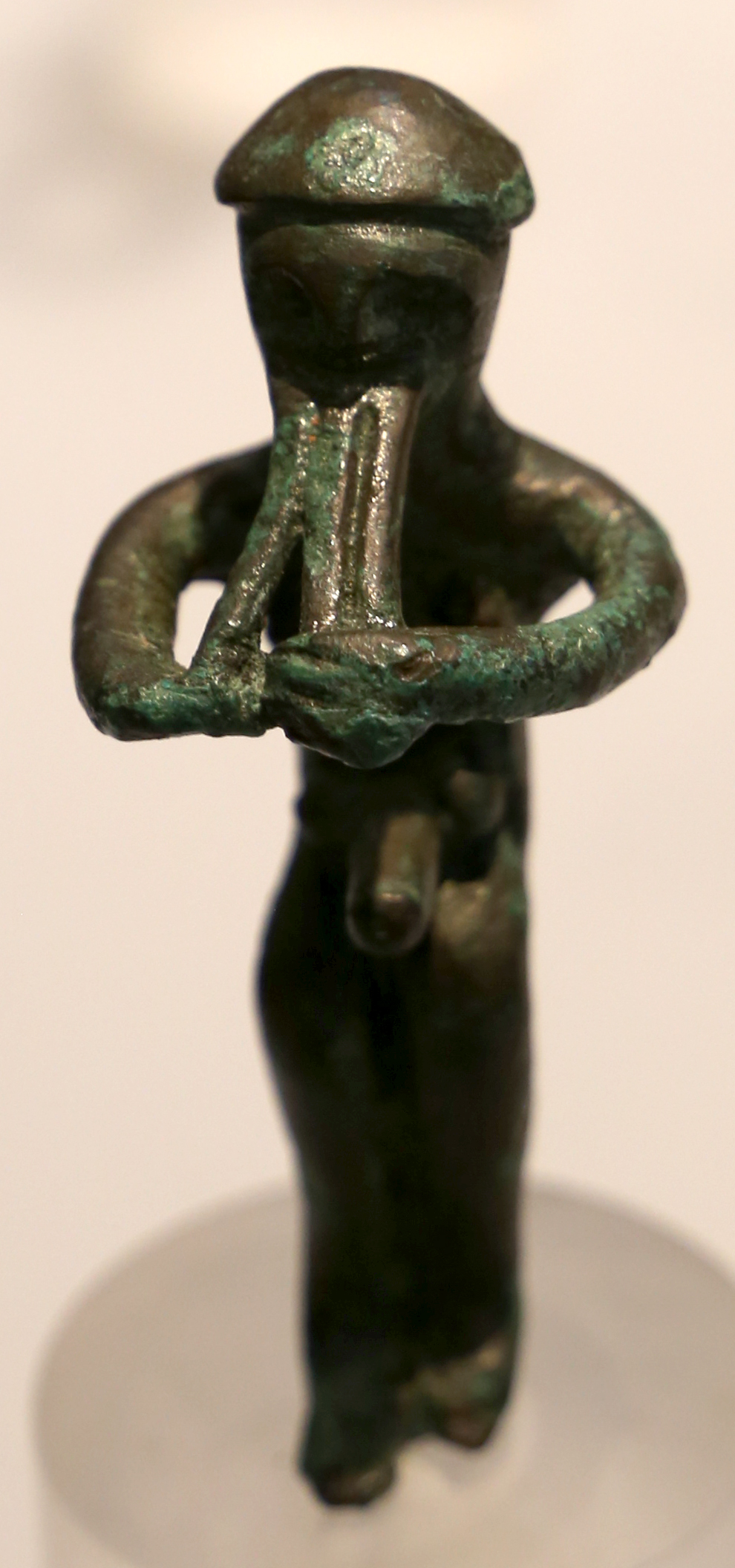
Ancient launeddas player from Ittiri

== Description ==
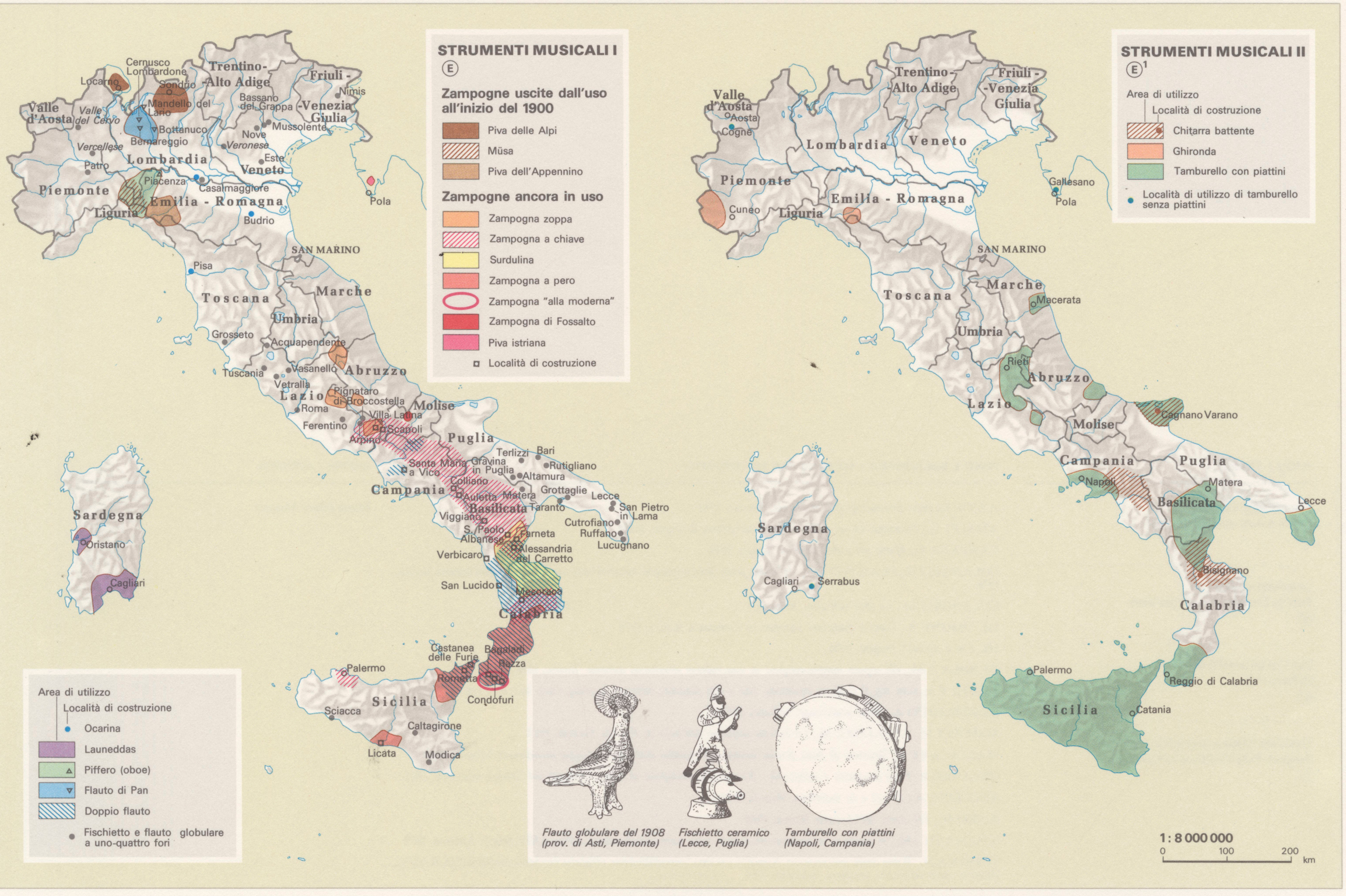
Map folk musical instruments in Italy

Launeddas are used to play a complex style of music by circular breathing that has achieved some international attention, especially Efisio Melis, Antonio Lara, Dionigi Burranca, and Luigi Lai. Melis and Lara were the biggest stars of the 1930s golden age of launeddas, and each taught their style to apprentices such as Lara's Aureliu Porcu.

Launeddas consist of three reed pipes, two five-holed chanters of different lengths and one drone. They are played using circular breathing.

== See also ==
- Triple pipes

== Listening ==
- Launeddas player Luigi Lai
