= Mijwiz =

Traditional Middle Eastern single-reed musical instrument

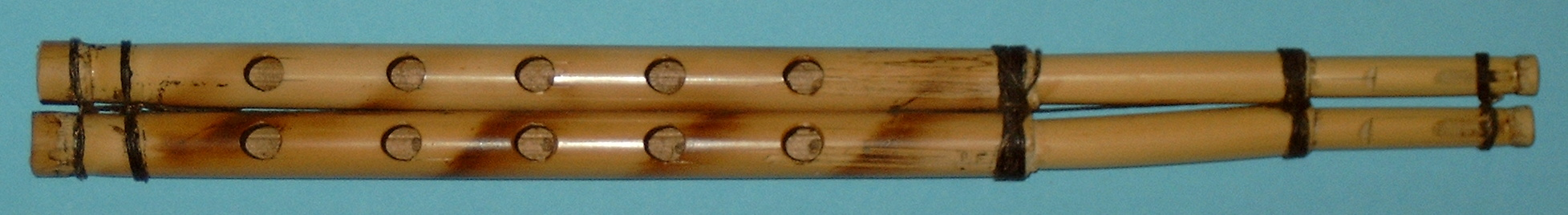
- Mijwiz from Egypt

Woodwind instrument
- Classification: single-reed aerophone
- Hornbostel–Sachs classification: 422.211.2 (single reed instrument with cylindrical bore and fingerholes)

Related instruments
- arghul, bülban, clarinet, diplica, dili tuiduk, dozaleh, cifte, launeddas, pilili, sipsi, zammara, zummara

The mijwiz (Arabic: مجوز, DIN: miǧwiz) is a traditional West Asian musical instrument originating from the Levant( Palestine, Syria, Lebanon and Jordan.)Its name in Arabic means "dual", because of its consisting of two, short, bamboo pipes with reed tips put together, making the mijwiz a double-pipe, single-reed woodwind instrument.

== Background ==
The mijwiz consists of two pipes of equal length; each pipe has around five or six small holes for fingering. It requires a special playing technique known as "circular breathing," which is tricky but produces a continuous tone, without pausing to take a breath. The mijwiz is played in the Levant as an accompaniment to either belly dancing or dabke, the folkloric line dance of the Levant. Many popular folk songs either include the mijwiz on recordings, or include the instrument's name in the song's lyrics. One example is the famous Lebanese dabke song "Jeeb el Mijwiz ya Abboud" (Arabic: جيب المجوز يا عبّود) by the singer Sabah.

The mijwiz is also related to the arghul (or yarghoul), which consists of one short pipe with five to six holes and a longer pipe joined to it just like the mijwiz and produces a very similar sound to it.

The mijwiz like the argoul is related to ancestor of some types of bagpipes. However, in the case of the mijwiz, the cheeks of the player with their circular breathing act like the bag that contains the air in a bagpipe.

== See also ==
- Mizwad
- Arghul
- Double flute
- Launeddas
