= Dozaleh =

Wind instrument in Iran

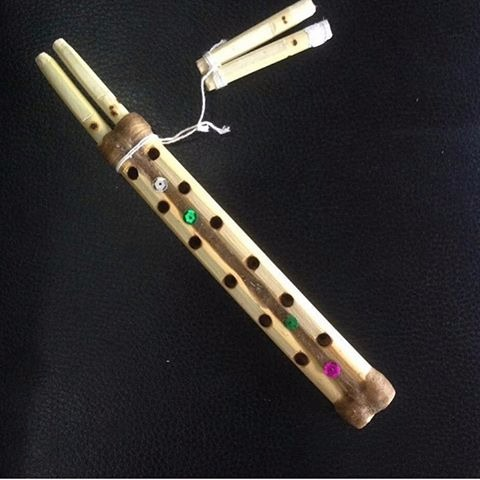
- Iranian instrument with reed body

Woodwind instrument
- Other names: Donay (Kurds); ghoshmeh (Kurds); koshnai (Uzbeks, Tajiks)
- Classification: Aerophone
- Hornbostel–Sachs classification: 422.221.2 single-reed aerophones, with a regular bore and fingerholes, sets of clarinets (The pipe has a single 'reed' consisting of a percussion lamella)

Playing range
- One to two octaves

Related instruments
- Arghul; Bülban; Double clarinet; Launeddas; Mijwiz; Ney-anbān; Pilili (Georgia); Reclam de xeremies; Sipsi

The Dozaleh (Kurdish: Dûzele) is an Kurdish folk instrument. The dozaleh is made of two pipes. One of them produces melody and the other harmony. It sounds like a Ney-anbān and it is very dynamic.

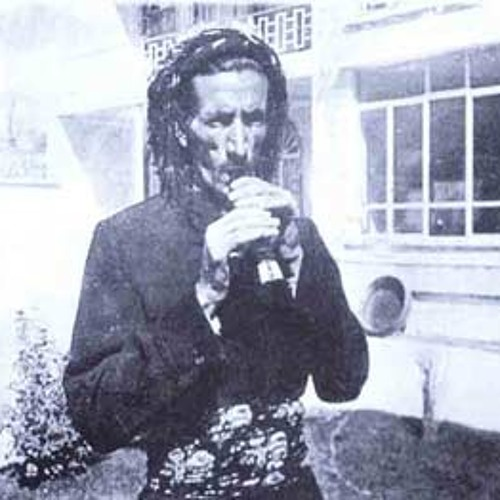
Kurdish Dûzele

The instrument is played in the Kurdistan Region in Middle East among the Kurdish people, and further east it is included in the music traditions of the Tajik and Uzbek peoples.

== Names ==
The instrument is called Dozaleh (دو زَله) in Iran, from zal (زَل), the Persian word for the stem of the zal reed.

The instrument goes by a variety of names in Iran. It is known as Jowffti (Persian, "pair": جفتی) in Hormozgan, Do Ney (Persian, "two reeds": دو نی) in Lorestan, Do Sazeh (Persian, "two structures": دو سازه) in South Khorasan Province, and Ghooshmeh (Persian: قوشمه) among Khorasan's Kurdish people.

Ghooshmeh may have come from the tradition of making the instruments from the bones of birds, although one linguist suggests other possibilities, including "pair."

== Ghoshmeh ==
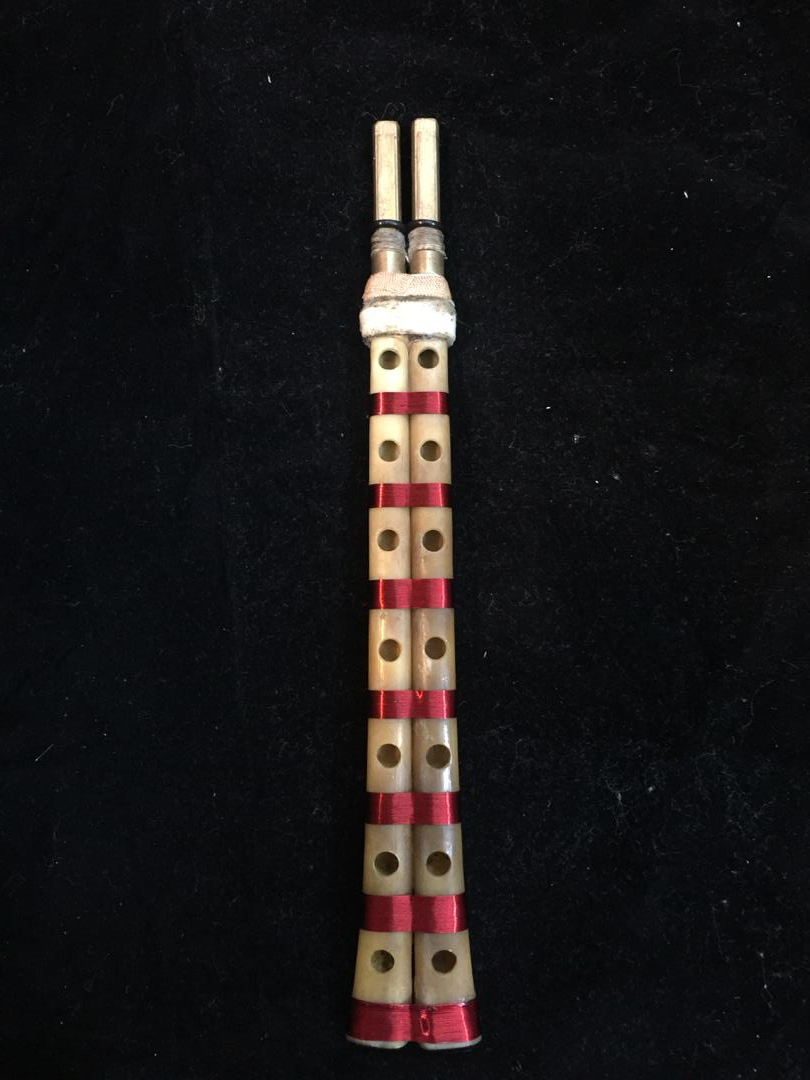
Ghoshmeh. (قشمه استخوانی "Bone ghoshmeh"). Instrument made from bird bones

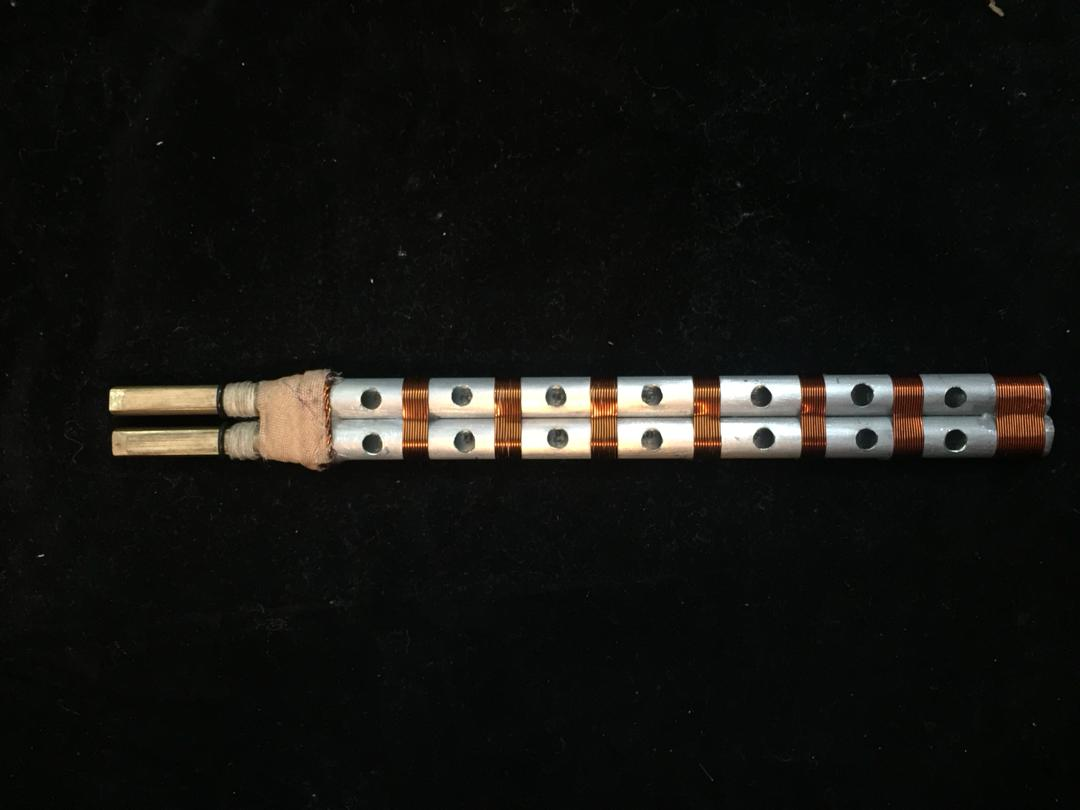
Aluminum-bodied instrument (قوشمه از جنس آلمینیوم "Ghoshmeh made of aluminum")

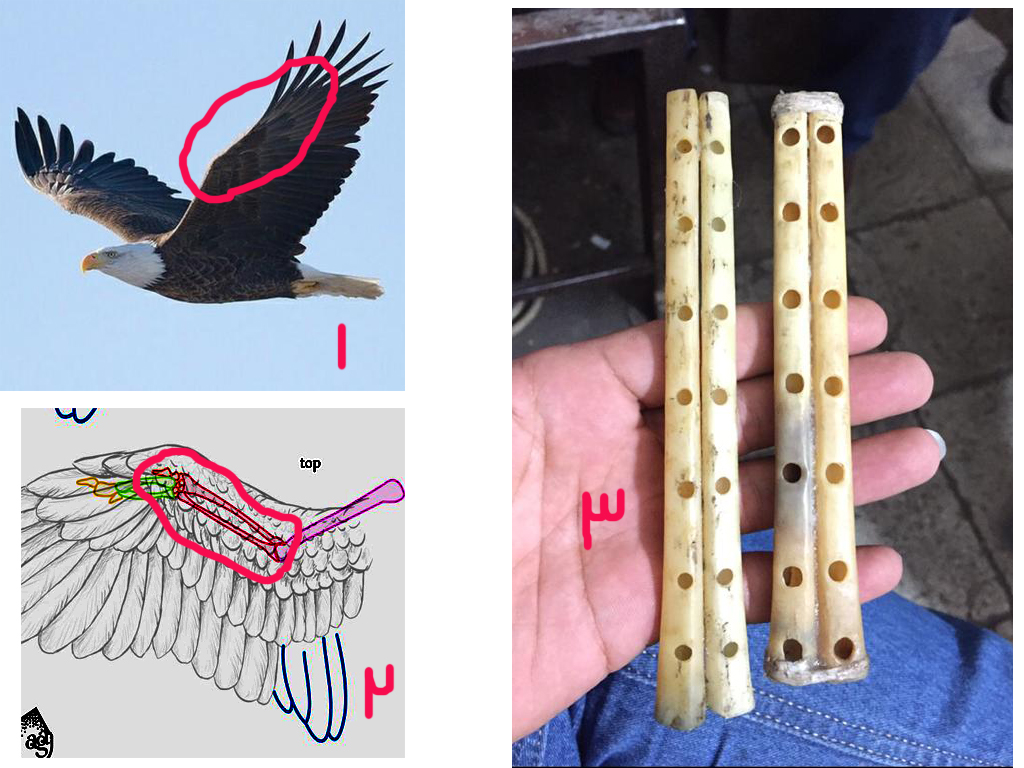
Image showing location of eagle bones used to make the Ghoshmeh and the bones in the polishing stage.

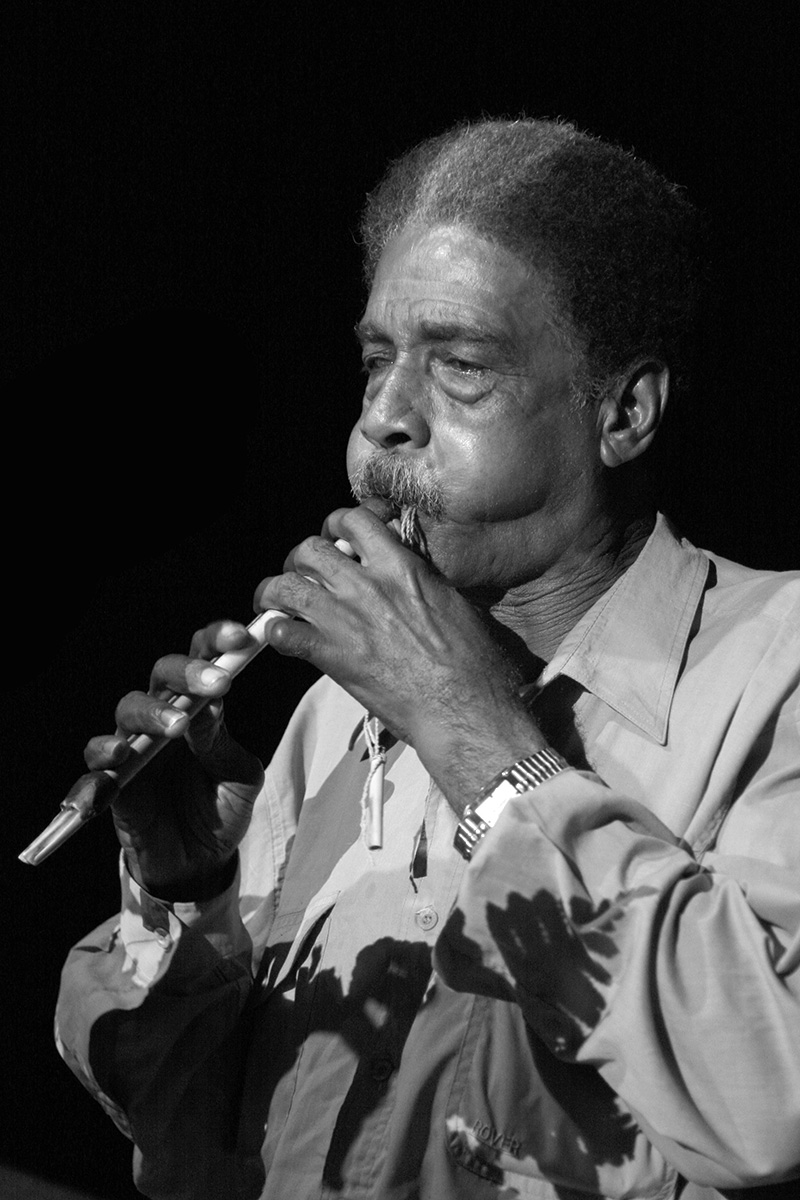
Musician Ghanbar Rastgoo playing Hormozgan's version of the "Saz" (instrument, ساز) + "gifti" (paired, جفتی). (Saz gifti, paired instrument, ساز جفتی).

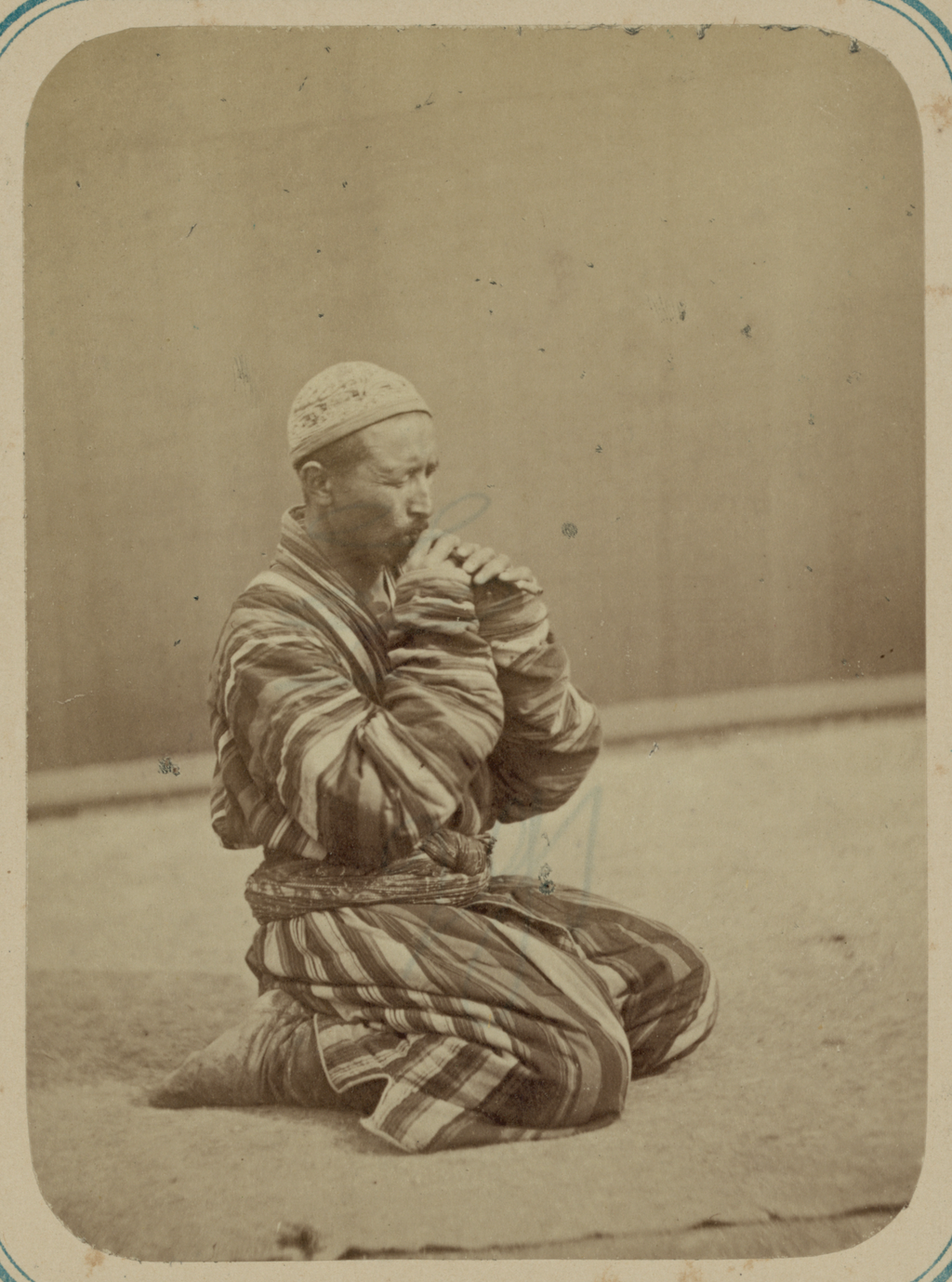
Musician from Russian Turkestan, about 1872, playing the koshnai (variation of the word ghoshmeh).

== History ==
Dozaleh or (Donay in Kurdish) is a very old instrument that is one of the first Iranian wind instruments.

In Kurdish areas, this instrument is made from a plant called Zaleh, which grows near rivers.

In modern times, the instrument's body has also been made from aluminum or copper tubes.

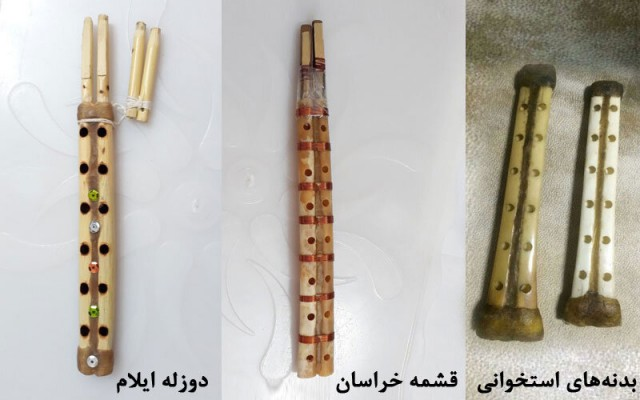
This photo shows three different models of dozaleh, the model on the right is made by bone of some animals. The middle dozeleh is for Khorasan region and the photo on the left is for Kurdish regions.

The instrument has been seen as sufficiently important to Iranian culture and history to encourage interest in it, through placement on the Iran National Heritage List. It is placed in works of North Khorasan in the "field of intangible cultural heritage", item 1543: Techniques and skills of making Ghoshmeh local instrument.

== Playing ==
This instrument has 5 to 7 holes in each reed. It is played by three middle fingers of both hands, which are placed on the holes of the instrument. The thumbs take the instrument from behind. The musician puts the instrument's reed "tongue" inside his mouth and blows into it.

== See also ==
- Ghoshmeh in Persian
- Qoşme Kurdish
