= Double clarinet =

The term double clarinet refers to any of several woodwind instruments consisting of two parallel pipes made of cane, bird bone, or metal, played simultaneously, with a single reed for each. Commonly, there are five or six tone holes in each pipe, or holes in only one pipe while the other acts as a drone, and the reeds are either cut from the body of the instrument or created by inserting smaller, slit tubes into the ends of the pipes. The player typically uses circular breathing.

The double clarinet is not a clarinet in the modern western sense of the term, since it lacks a register key; in this regard it is more closely related to the chalumeau.

== Varieties ==
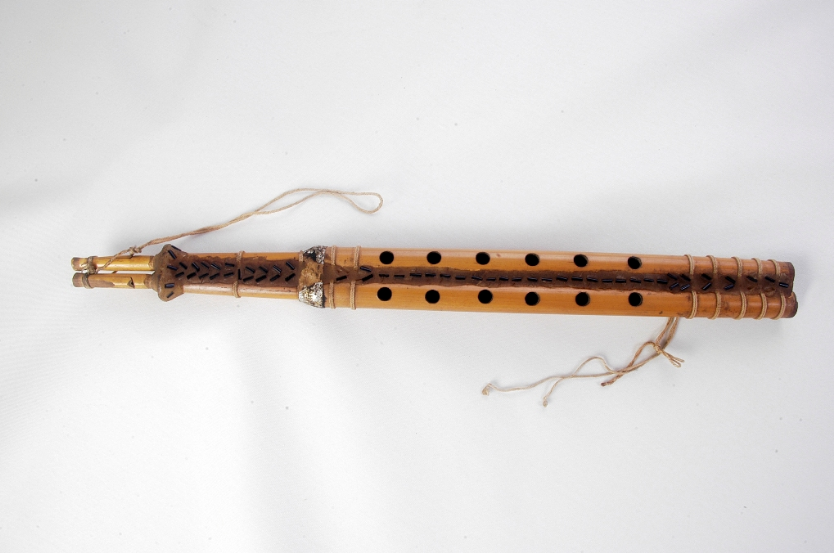
Zummāra Sittawiyya, collection of the Museo de instrumentos musicales Emilio Azzarini

Double clarinets are found primarily in Middle Eastern music, but also in India; there are different versions and names in different countries.

In Yemen, the double clarinet is called a mizmār. This word is used for other types of instruments in other countries.

More common terms are zamr, zammāra, arghūl, and mijwiz (مجوز). The first two of these names have the same linguistic root as mizmār.

In Albania the instrument is called a zumare. It has five holes in each pipe, and a bell.

In Egypt the instrument is known as a zummāra. Both tubes are about 30 to 35 centimetres long; one may have four to six holes while the other has none and acts as a drone, or both can have holes. Its range is very limited, about a fourth.

The arghūl is primarily an Egyptian instrument, having a melody pipe with five to seven holes and a longer drone pipe without holes. It occurs in several sizes. In one specimen the melody and drone pipes are about 80 and 240 centimetres long, respectively, though the drone has removable sections to alter its pitch.

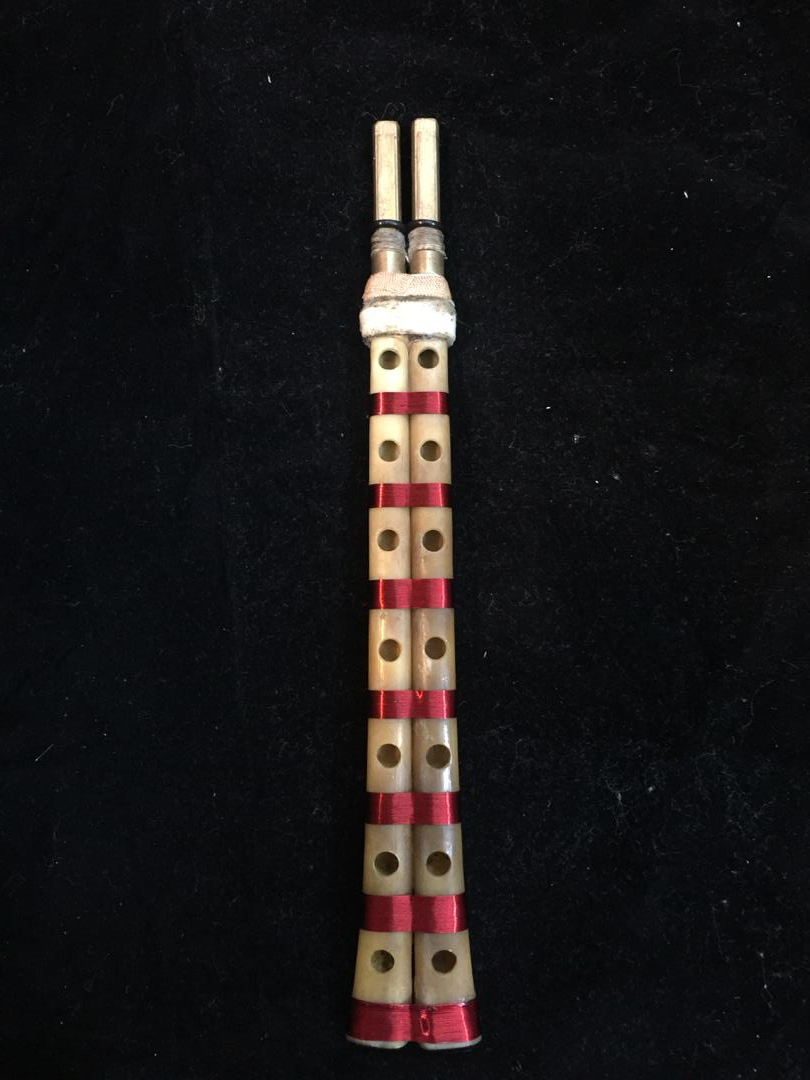
Ghoshmeh. Instrument made from bird bones. Iran.

Iran has a variety of double clarinets, made from raptor bones, copper or aluminum tubing or wood. The instrument is called dozaleh (دو زَله) in Kurdistan, from zal (زَل), the Kurdish word for the stem of the zal reed. The instrument goes by a variety of names in Iran. It is known as jannati (Persian, "pair": جفتی) in Hormozgan, do ney (Persian, "two reeds": دو نی) in Lorestan, do sazeh (Persian, "two structures": دو سازه) in South Khorasan Province, and ghoshmeh (Persian: قوشمه) among Khorasan's Kurdish people.

The Iraqi double clarinet is also called a zummāra, although this term also is used for a single-tube simple clarinet. It is similar to the Syrian mijwiz.

In Morocco and Tunisia the instrument, called zamr, has a single or double bell. The Moroccan instrument has six holes in each pipe. The Moroccan mizmār or zamr rīfī is over 100 centimetres long, again with six holes in each pipe, ending in two bull's horns.

In Libya the instrument is called zukra (زكرة).

The double clarinet in Syria, western Iraq, Lebanon, Palestine, and Jordan is called a mijwiz. It is about thirty centimetres long, typically with six holes for each tube. Melodies are played in unison on both pipes, often with one pipe tuned slightly higher than the other to produce acoustic beats.

The Yemeni instrument is called a mizmār. It is attached to the player's mouth using a muzzle.

In Italy, the Sicilian zampogna bagpipe, also called a ciaramedda, is additionally referred to as a "doppio clarinetto" (double clarinet), because of its two equal length single reed chanters. A version of this instrument is also played in the Province of Reggio Calabria. Other single reed, double chanter bagpipes found in Southern Italy include the Sordulina and the zampogna "a moderna", both of which are found in Calabria. In the province of Messina, in the local dialect, the single blade can reed mounted in the instrument's chanters and drones is called a "zammara."

In the island of Ibiza, in the Balearic Islands of Spain, there is the reclam de xeremies. Basque Country has the alboka.

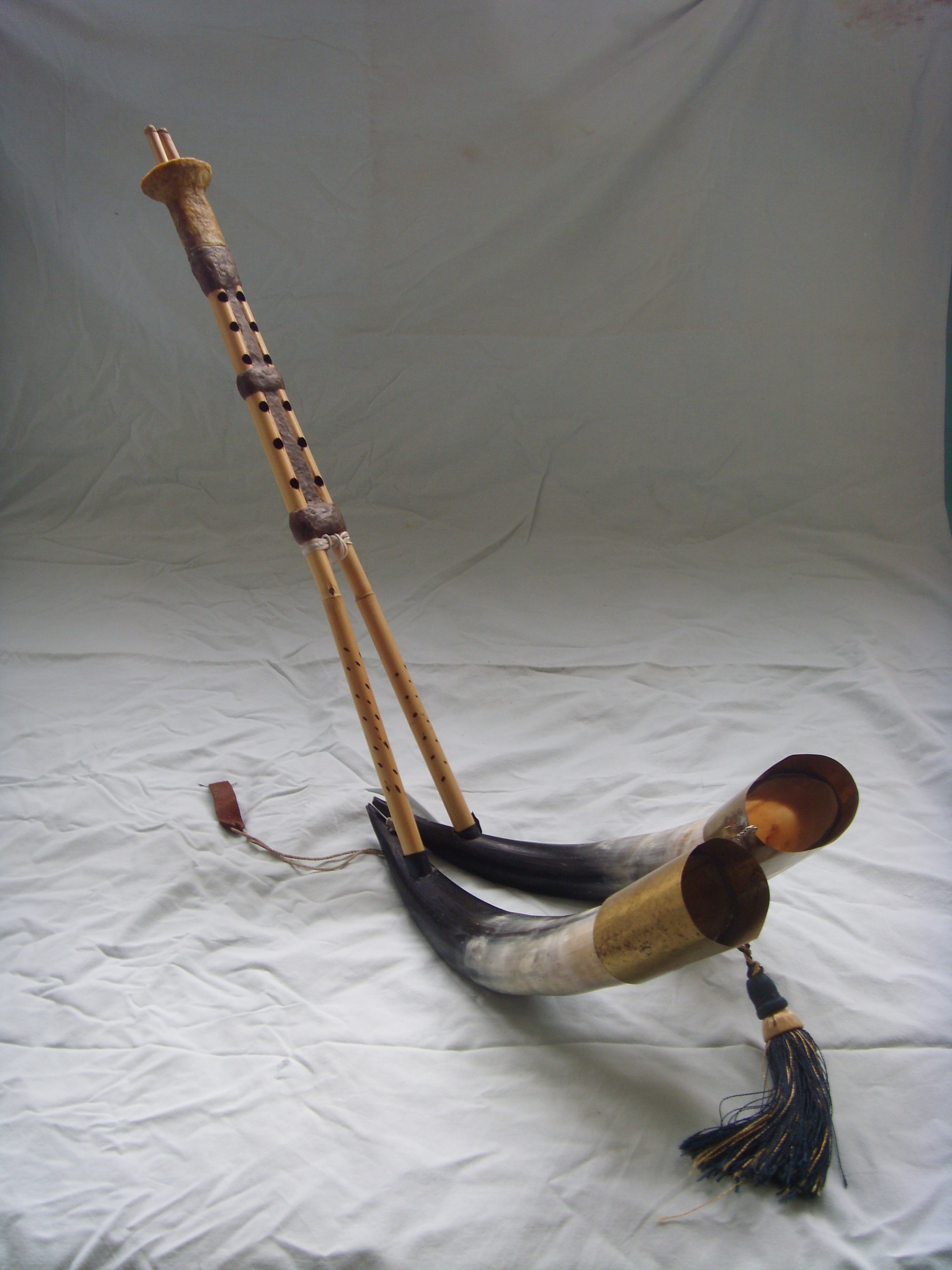
The zamar, a Rifian traditional musical instrument

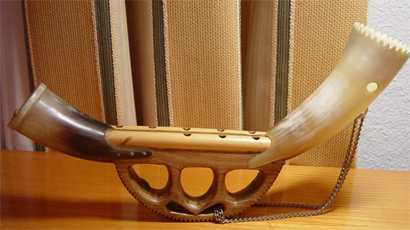
Alboka

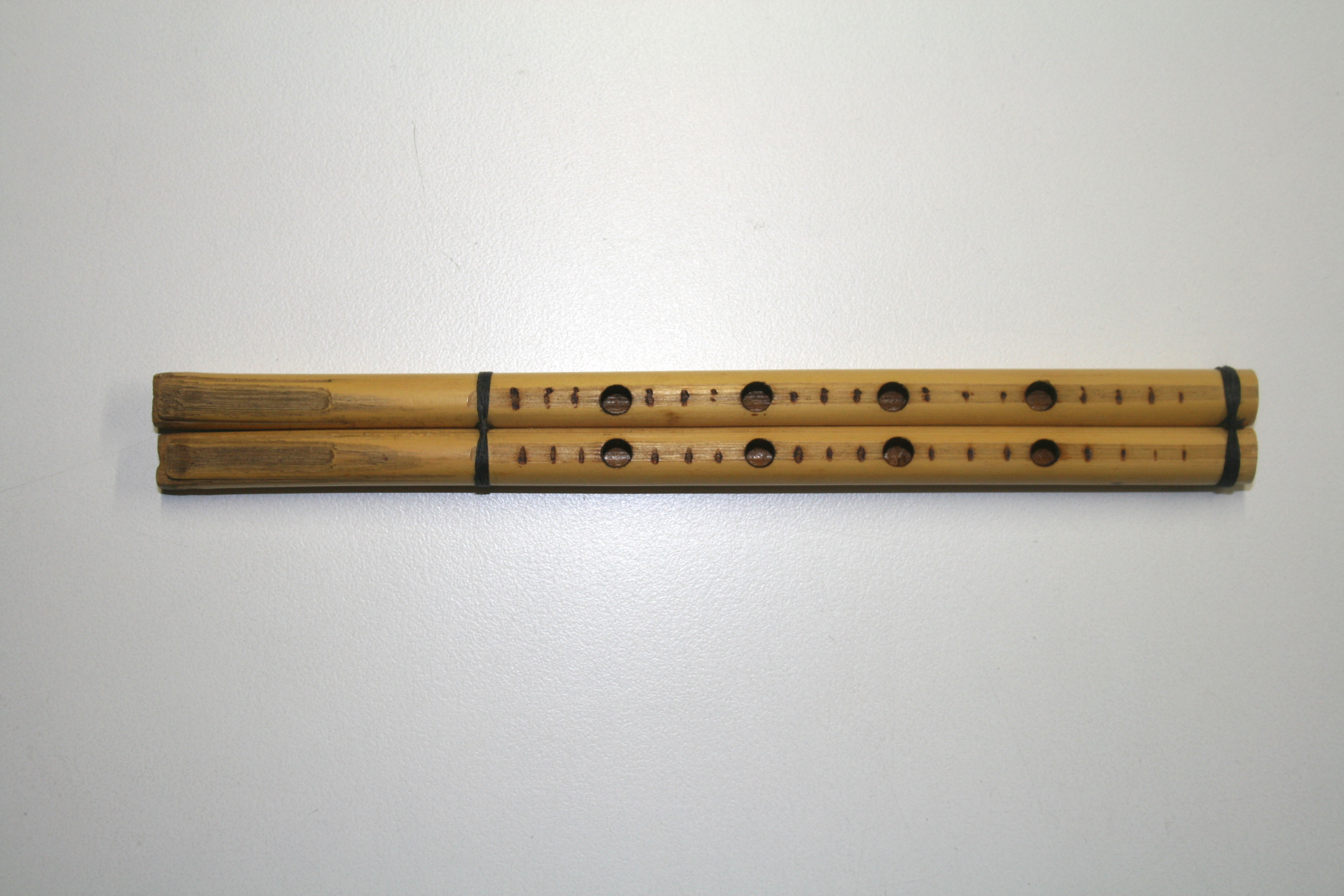
reclam de xeremies

== Other meanings ==
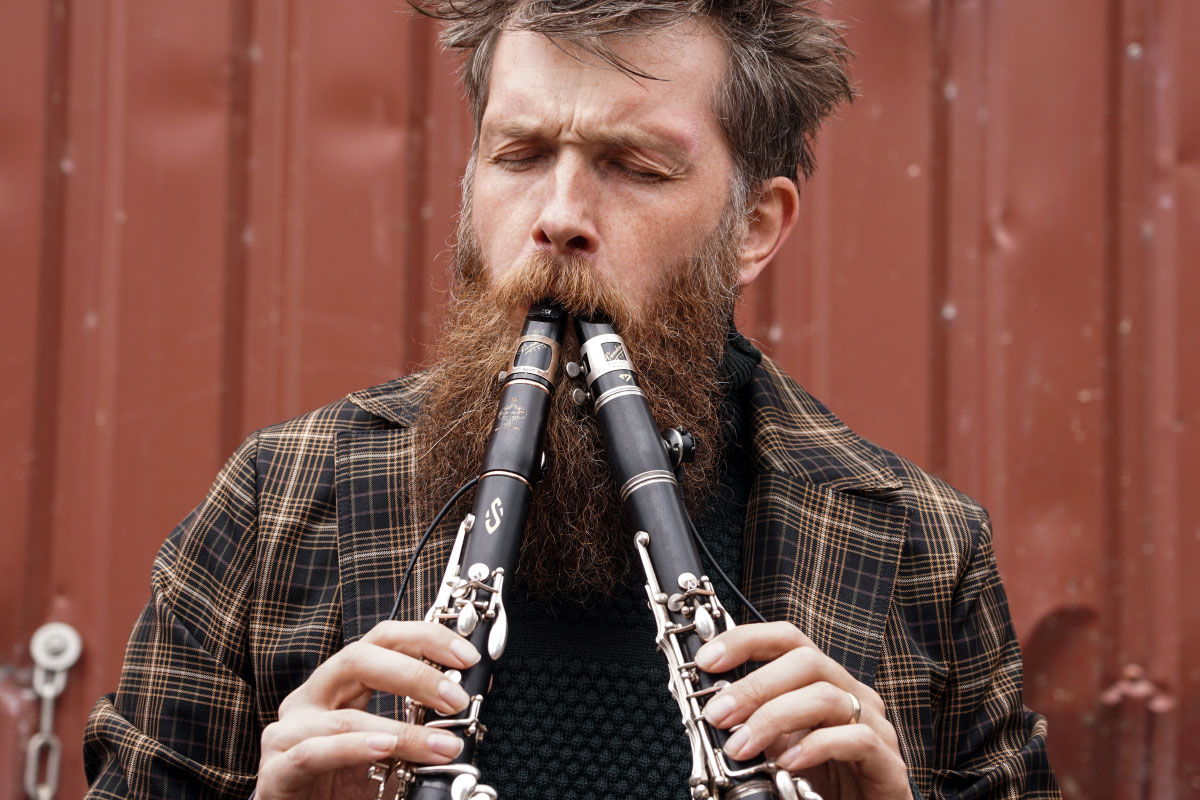
- Lars Greve playing two clarinets at Aarhus Jazz Festival
  Double clarinet might refer to an organ stop, also known as the bass clarinet or bass clarionet. ("Double" is here used in the old-fashioned sense of a double-length and hence lower-pitched version of an instrument, e.g. "double bassoon" meaning contrabassoon.)
- Concertos for two clarinets are known as double clarinet concertos.
- Some pieces by clarinetist-composers Eric Mandat and William O. Smith call for two clarinets to be played simultaneously by one person. These works are sometimes listed as being written for "double clarinet."

== See also ==
- Launeddas, a triple clarinet from Sardinia
- Aulochrome, recently invented double soprano saxophone
- Aulos, arguably the ancestor of these instruments
- Argul, a traditional Arabic musical instrument
