= Algaita =

Double reed wind instrument from West Africa

- Classification: Double reed

Related instruments
- Sorna; Rhaita; Suona; Sopila; Shawm; Zurna

The algaita (also spelled alghaita, algayta or algheita) is a double reed wind instrument from the Sahelian region of West-Central Africa that is used by the Bamum, Hausa and Kanuri peoples in Cameroon and Nigeria. Its construction is similar to the oboe-like rhaita and the zurna. The algaita is distinguished from these other instruments by its larger, trumpet-like bell. Instead of keys, it has open holes for fingering, similar to the zurna.

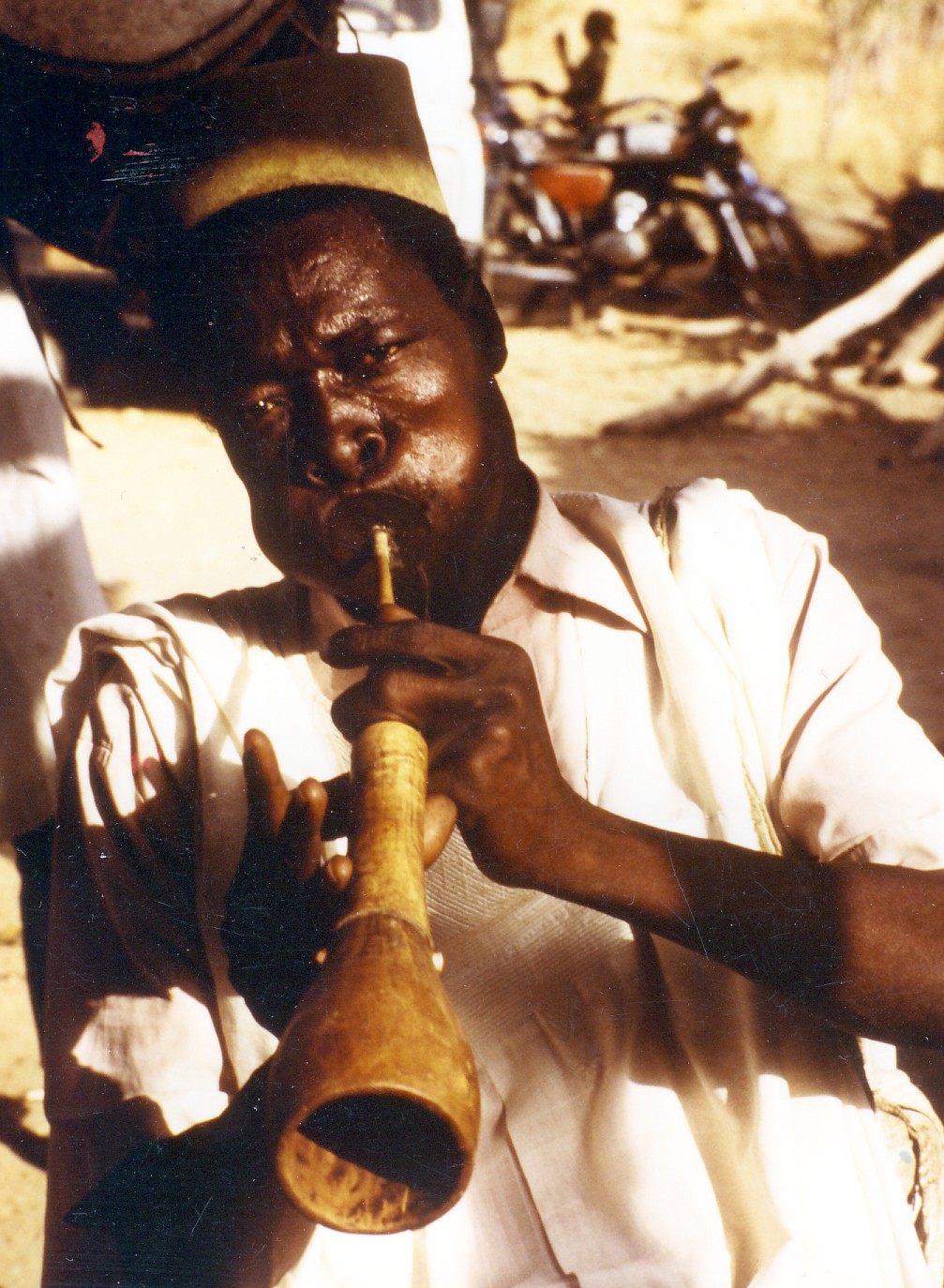
Algaita player, Kapsiki, Cameroon

== Traditional recordings ==
- Music from the Villages of Northeastern Nigeria (Folkways, 1971)
- "Music of the Cameroon - The Fulani of the North" (Lyrichord 7334)

== Use in jazz recordings ==
- Yusef Lateef, In Nigeria, (YAL Records, 1983)
- Yusef Lateef, The African-American Epic Suite (1994)

== See also ==
- Kakaki
- Oboe
- Rhaita
- Shawm
- Washint
- Zurna
