= Gyaling =

Musical instrument

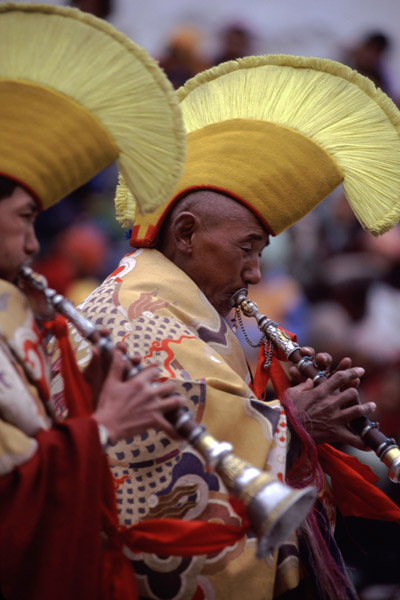
- Monks playing gyalings at Spituk monastery, near Leh, Ladakh, India
- Classification: Double reed

Related instruments
- Sorna; Rhaita; Suona; Sopila; Shawm; Zurna; Duduk

The gyaling (Tibetan: རྒྱ་གླིང་།, Wylie: rgya gling, English: also spelled gya ling, gya-ling, jahlin, jah-lin, jahling, jah-ling, rgya-gling etc.), literally "Indian trumpet", is a traditional woodwind instrument used in Tibet. As its name indicates, it is the Chinese double reed Suona horn (much like the Iranian sorna) used mainly in Tibetan monasteries during puja (chanting and prayer) and is associated with peaceful deities and the idea of devotion.

== Design ==
The gyaling is oboe-like in appearance with a long hardwood body and copper brass bell. The instrument is generally covered with ornate embellishments of colored glass. The double reed, which is made from a single stem of marsh grass, is placed upon a small metal channel that protrudes out of the top. There are eight (8) fingerholes on a standard gyaling.

To play a gyaling requires a technique called circular breathing, in which the instrument is played continuously, even while the musician breathes. The reed is placed fully in the player’s mouth but does not touch it; the lips are pressed against the flat metal channel below the reed. Airflow affects the gyaling's tuning. Gyaling technique varies depending on the lineage and ritual.

== Usage in ritual ==
A typical Tibetan Buddhist ritual orchestra consists of a gyaling, dungchen, kangling, dungkar (conch shells), drillbu (handbells), silnyen (vertical cymbals), and most importantly, chanting. Together, the music creates a state of mind to invite or summon deities.

Often, the style of performance is similar to that of a bagpipe, with many short and fast neighbor tones.

== Gallery ==
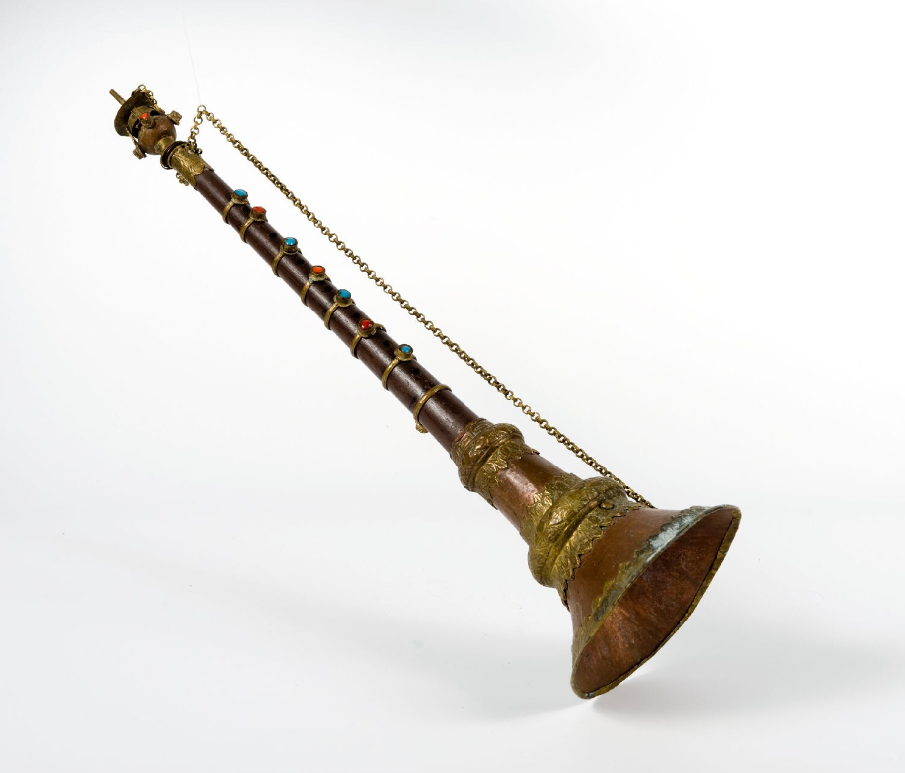
Gyaling at the National Museum of World Cultures and the World Museum.

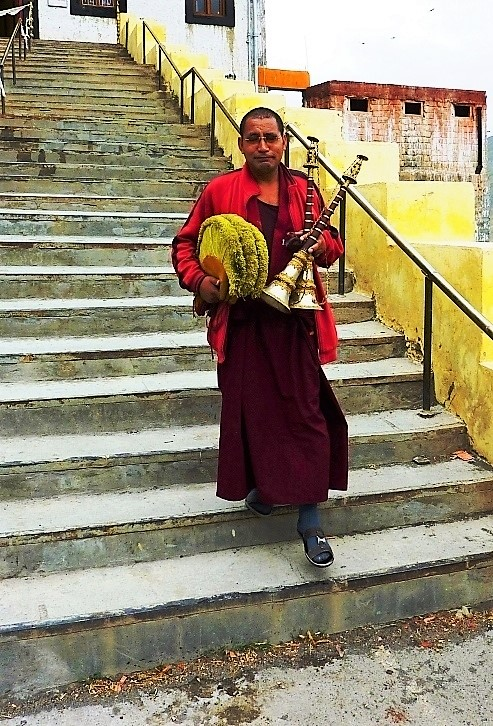
Monk at Key Monastery Spiti, Himachal Pradesh, India.

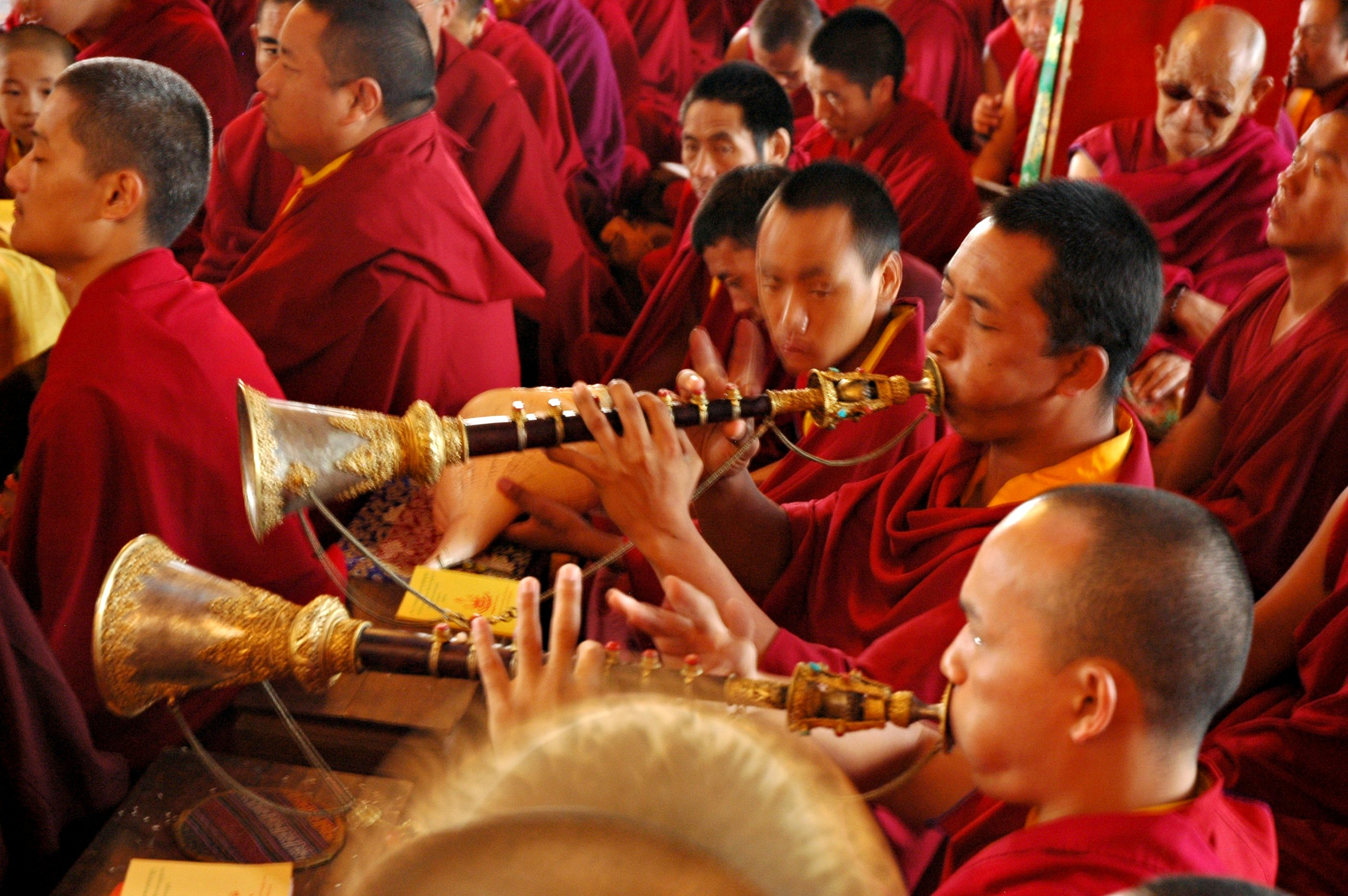
Tharlam Monastery, Boudha, Kathmandu, Nepal

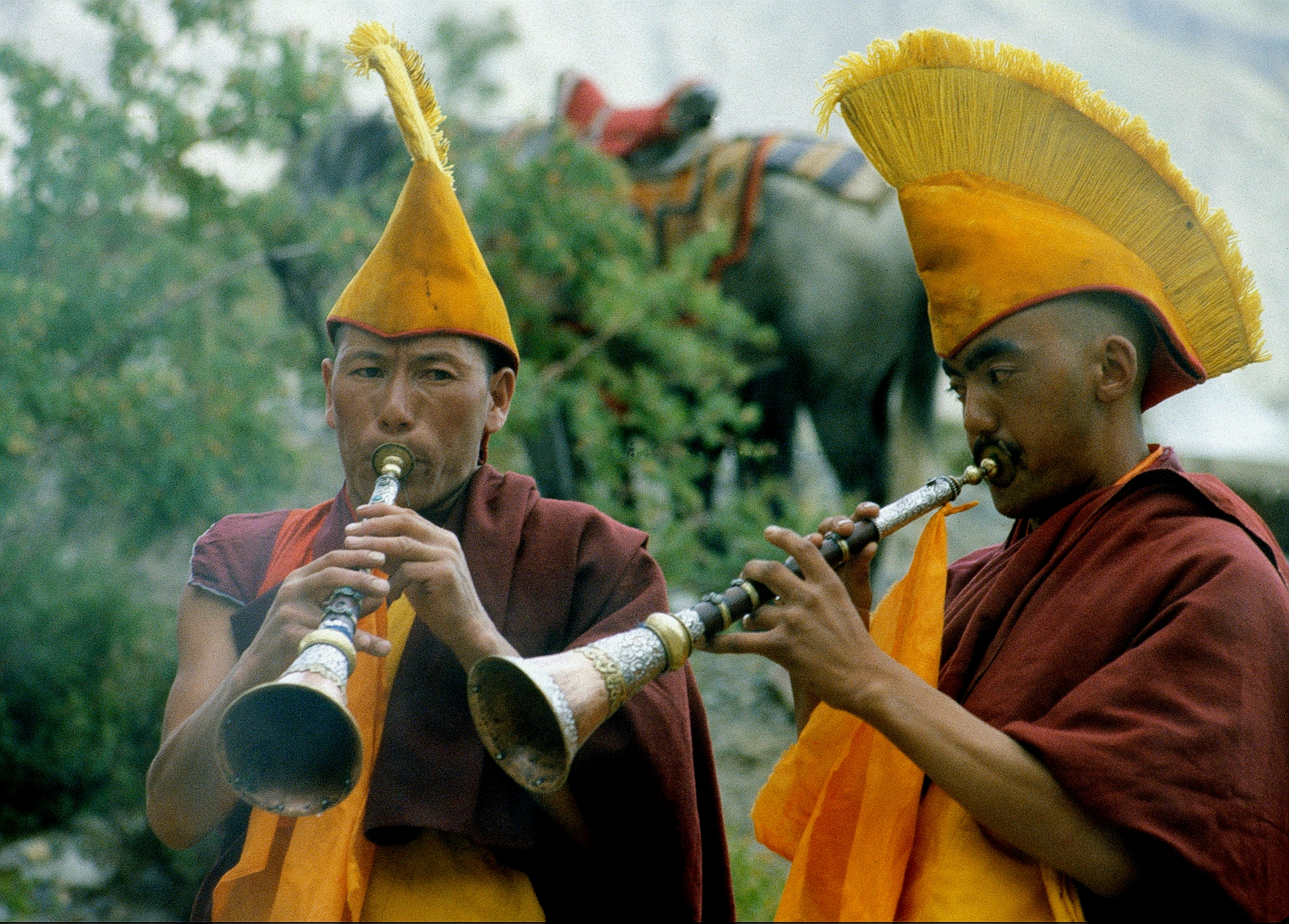
Playing gyaling at Lingshed Monastery

== See also ==
- Music of Asia
- Shawm
- Suona
- Sorna
- Tibetan Buddhism
