= Mizmar (instrument) =

Musical instrument

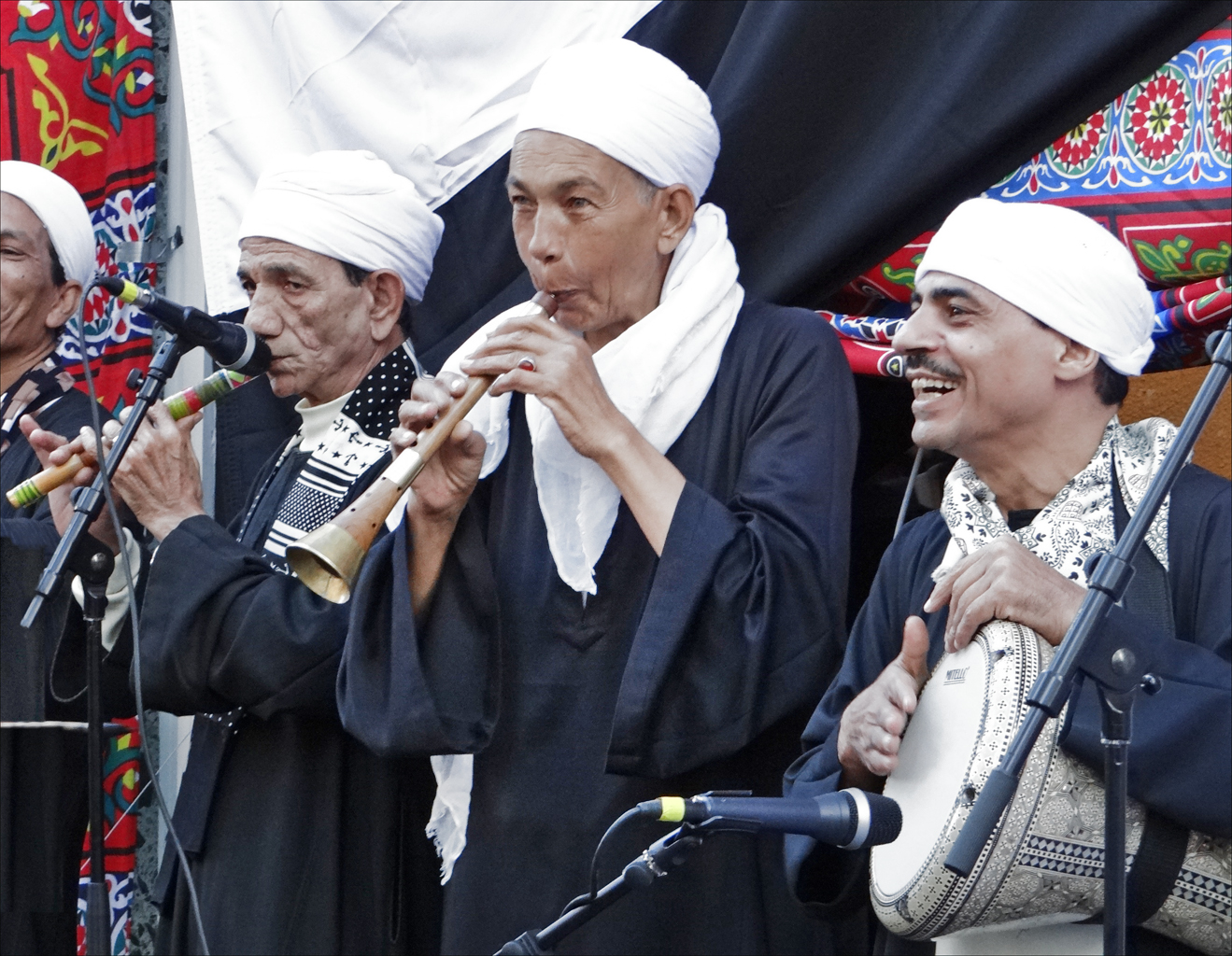
- Egyptian Musicians playing the traditional mizmar (center), between ney flute and goblet drum.
- Classification: Double reed

Related instruments
- Sorna; Rhaita; Suona; Sopila; Shawm

In Arabic music, a mizmār (Arabic: مزمار; plural مَزَامِير mazāmīr) is any single or double reed wind instrument. In Egypt and the Levant (Lebanon, Syria, Palestine and Jordan) the term mizmar usually refers to the conical shawm that is called zurna in Turkey and Armenia.

The mizmar is traditionally crafted from a single piece of wood, such as apricot or plum, though modern versions may use metal for durability. Its conical body, typically 30-40 cm long, narrows from the base to the top and features seven finger holes and a thumb hole for pitch control. The double reed, made from a desert plant called Hagna, is attached via a bocal, a small metal or wooden tube, which enhances airflow precision. The instrument’s design allows for its distinctive sharp, penetrating sound, ideal for outdoor settings like weddings and festivals.

Mizmar is also a term used for a group of musicians, usually a duo or trio, that play a mizmar instrument along with an accompaniment of one or two double-sided bass drums, known in Arabic as tabl baladi or simply tabl.

Mizmars are usually played in Egypt at either weddings or as an accompaniment to belly dancers. At Egyptian weddings, the Mizmar Baldi is accompanied with a belly dancer to greet the bride and groom.

In The Levant a higher-pitched version of the mizmar exists and is used for Zaffes(Levantine Traditional Wedding celebration)accompanied by the Tabl, Derbake and daf and may also be known in those countries as a zamr (زمر) or zamour, as well as mizmar. In Morocco and Algeria a similar instrument is called ghaita or rhaita (غيطة). Along with belly dancing, the mizmar may accompany the dabke, a folkloric line dance done in Jordan, Lebanon, Syria, Palestine, and a similar dance called Chobi in Iraq.

== See also ==
- Mizmar (dance)
