= List of musical instruments of Cameroon =

This article is a list of traditional musical instruments in Cameroon, based primarily on the research of Roger Blench (2009).

== Idiophones ==
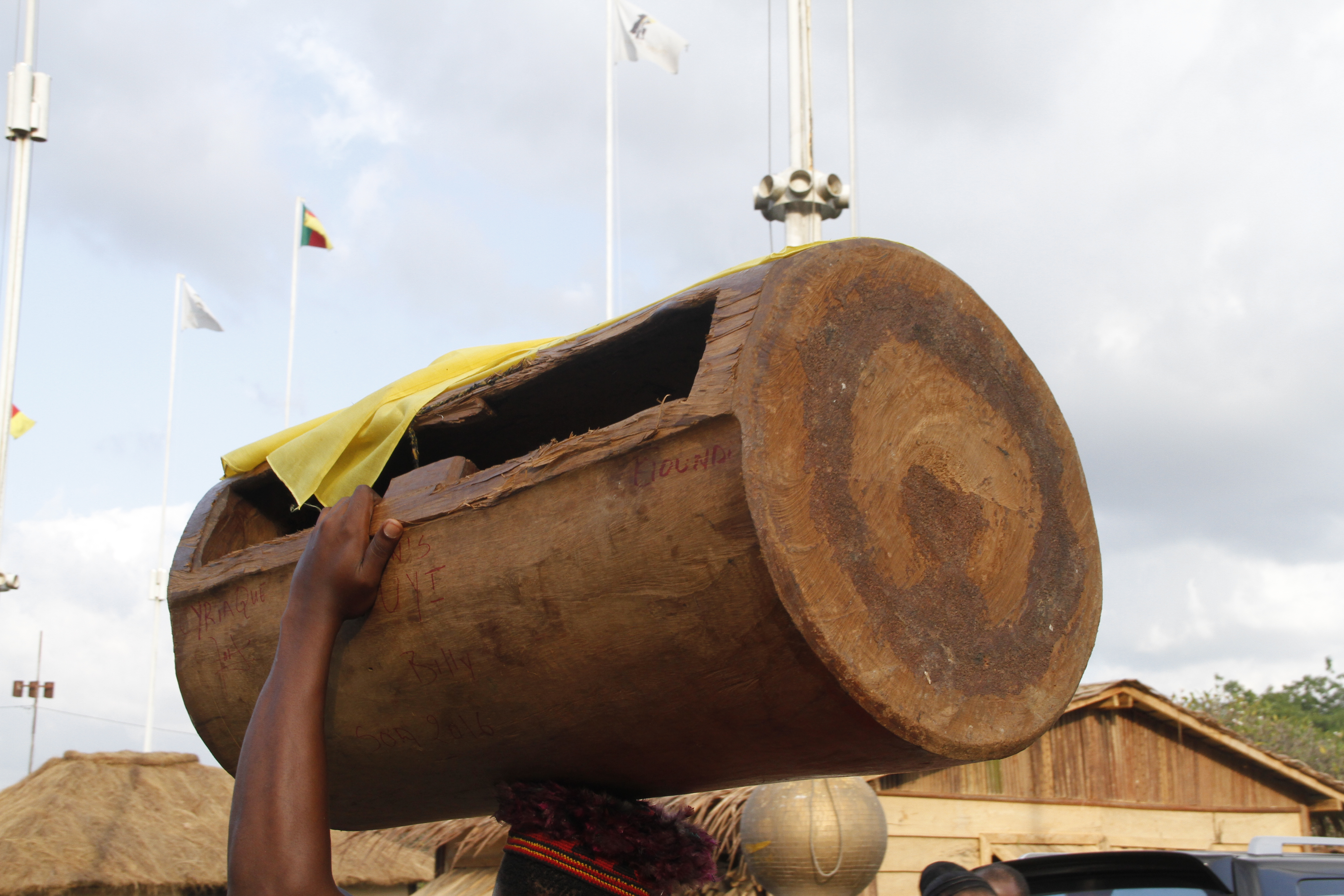
Slit gong in Cameroon

Idiophones of Cameroon include percussion instruments, untuned idiophones, tuned idiophones (xylophones), concussion instruments, and other instruments.

=== Percussion ===
- Slit gongs: historically used for long-distance communication, and often mimic tones in languages. Common throughout much of Africa, the tropical Americas, and Oceania. Called egyʉ̂k in Ejagham, and also played by the Oroko people and by Tunen speakers.

=== Untuned idiophones ===
- Struck plaques
  - Lithophones: played by the Mofu of northern Cameroon, and also in Central Nigeria and throughout the world. Women of the Noni and other nearby ethnic groups in Bui Division play flat lithophones. The Noni lithophone consists of a ncéw (large flat stone) struck by a pair of ncùy (smaller stones).
  - Struck iron plaque: a pair of sticks is used to strike a triangular plaque made of iron. Played in southeastern Cameroon by the Kwasio and Basaa peoples.
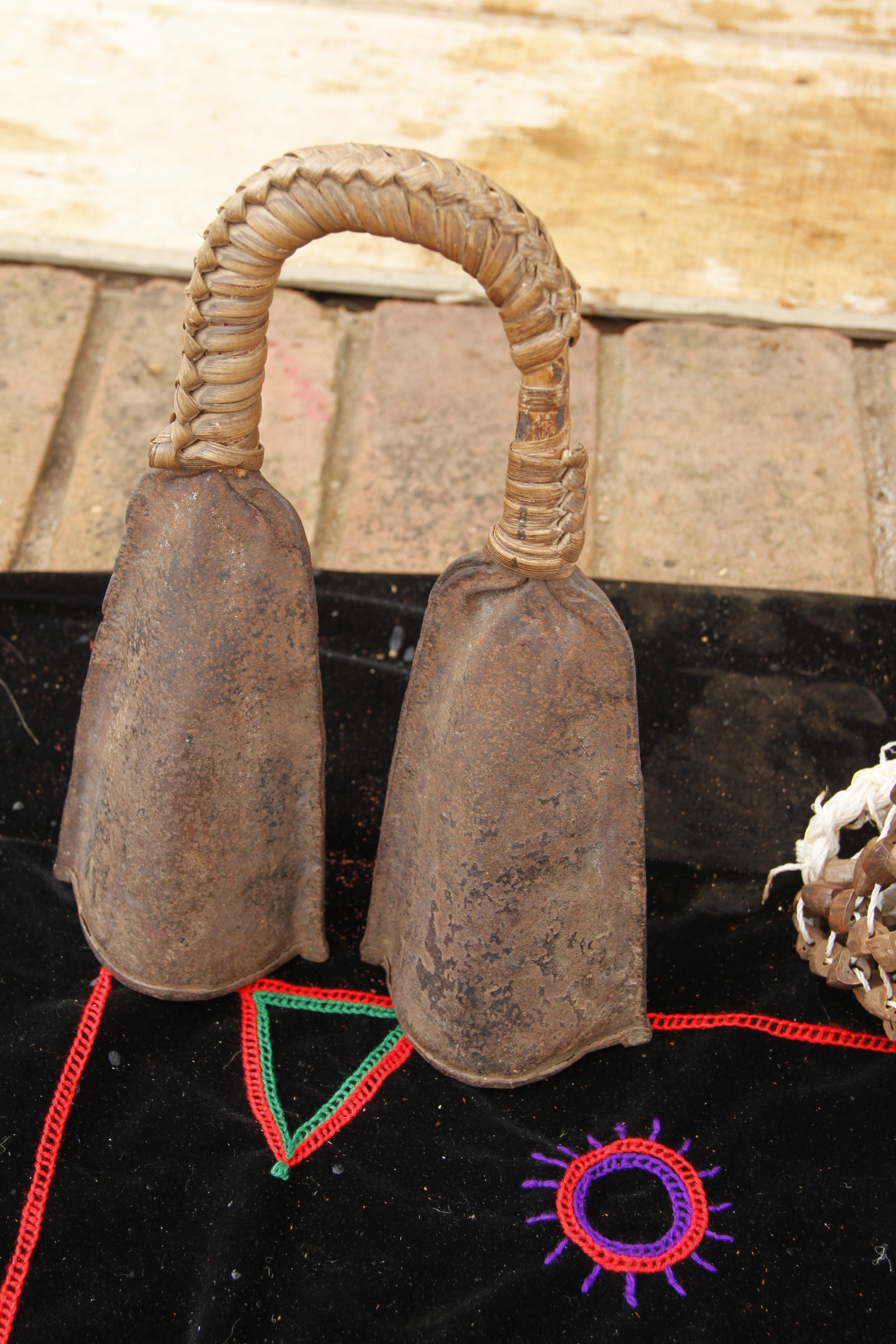
    Clapperless bells from Bamenda
- Struck bars: played in southwestern Cameroon by the Basaa, Kwasio, and other ethnic groups, and also by the Mbum of northern Cameroon. A long piece of bamboo or log (pilon in Mbum) is struck by multiple people using a pairs of sticks. Called disam in Mbum.
- Struck vessels
  - Struck gourds: calabash gourds struck using a pair of sticks. Played among women of northern Cameroon. Called kálá in Lagwan.
  - Struck tortoise shell: shells of Kinixys belliana and other tortoise species, used by the priests of the Oroko and other peoples for religious incantations.
- Clapperless bells: made of iron or bronze. Historically used for chiefs, especially in the Grassfields region. For example, Tikar chiefs historically had double bronze clapperless bells. Called fìŋkuy in Noni, nzème mmó or kẅìʼ fùɔ in Ngiemboon, and nkwom in Bamun. See double cloche in French.
- Clapper bells: examples include church bells, which have long structures inside that are used to strike the bell outside. Used by Yamba and other peoples of the Grassfields region, where they were often made of bronze and used for chiefs' ceremonies. These bells are often arranged in fruit-like clusters, which are attached to a long bar.
- Pellet bells: metal vessels with pellets inside. Played by the Mankon and other peoples.
  - Iron pellet bells: typically crescent-shaped. Called kéjyága in Ngiemboon. Ngiemboon speakers also have a rattling iron stick/spear, which has crescent-shaped, pellet-containing bells welded to it.
  - Spherical/oval pellet bells: round or elliptical shape.
- Rattles
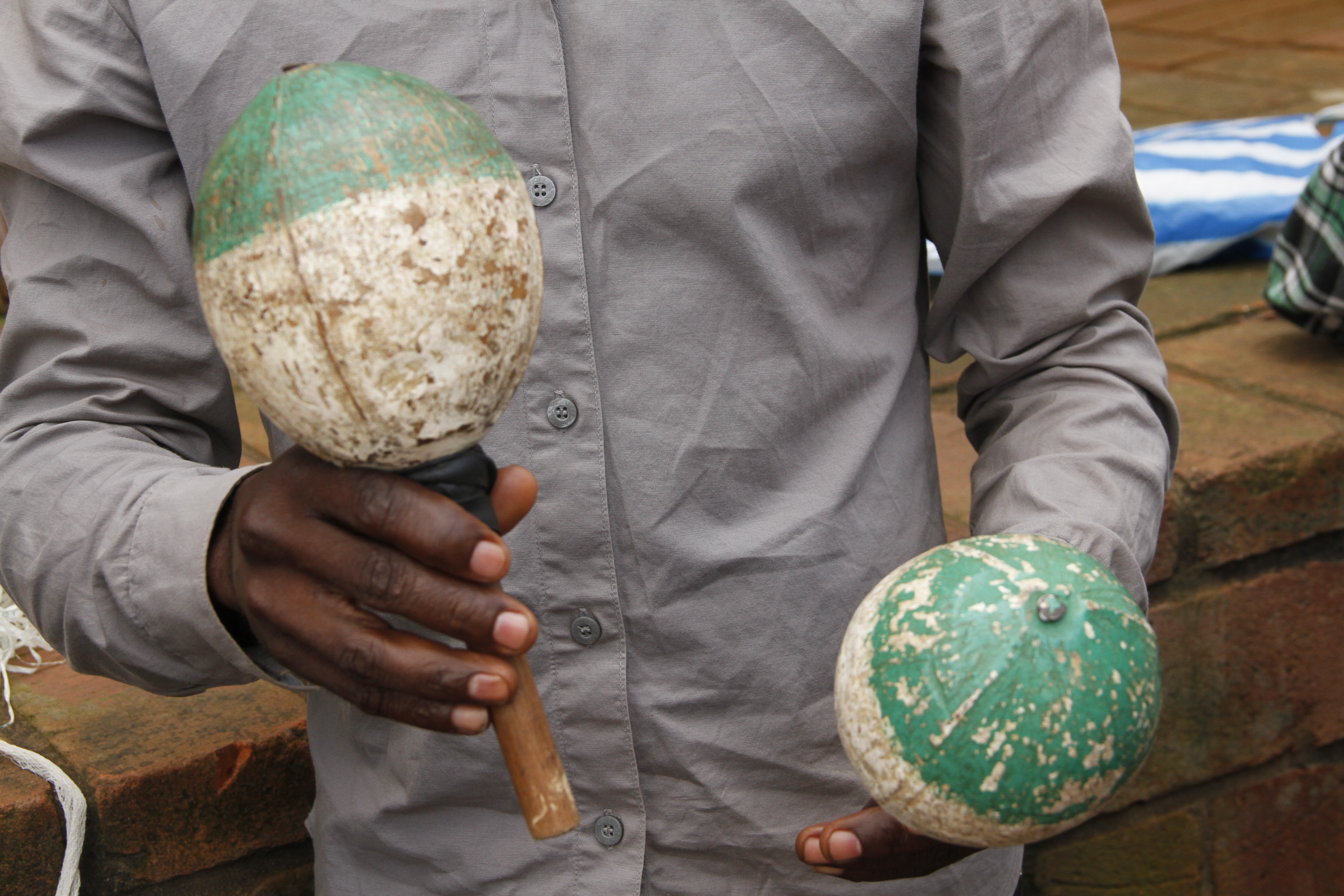
  Vessel rattles made of wood in Cameroon
  - Vessel rattles: similar to the maracas of South America. Materials can include coconut shells and wood.
  - Basketry rattle: can be cylindrically shaped, and are usually filled with grains. Called kwedekwede in Zulgo and mbàcà in Noni, and also played by the Fali, Dii, Voko, Mafa, and Parkwa peoples.
  - Gourd vessel rattle: can be conically shaped, and are made from calabash gourds. Called dukuced in Zulgo, kásákásá in Lagwan, and mbara in Mbum.
  - Gourd net rattles: encased by nets with seeds strung into them. Called ficáw in Noni.
  - Box rattle: rectangular box made of slats from the raffia palm, filled with seeds. Found in the Nkambé region, where it is called cɛ́ɛ̀sáŋ in Noni and cɛ̀ɛ̀nsáŋ in Limbum.
  - Palm-leaf box suspended rattles: sets of small rectangular boxes made from dried Borassus aethiopum leaves that are strung onto cords. They are wrapped around the ankles, legs, or wrists, and used in dances in northern Cameroon. Called ghízgá in Lagwan, and txwtsa in Laamang.

=== Tuned idiophones (xylophones) ===
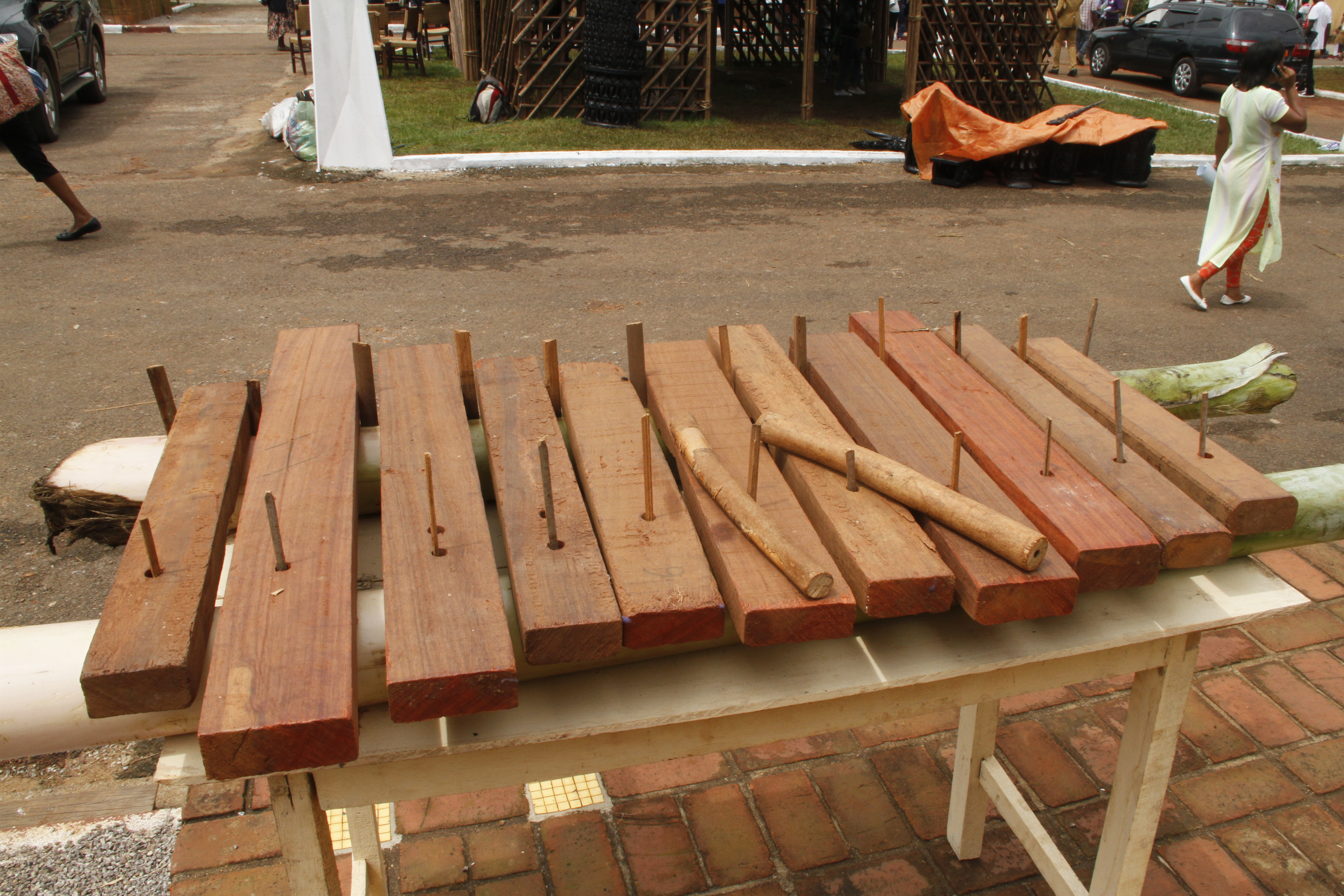
Central Africa-type xylophone from western Cameroon

Xylophones can have calabash or horn resonators. Calabash resonators are found through southern and central Cameroon, while horn resonators are found in parts of northeastern Nigeria, extending slightly into northern Cameroon. The Mofu people historically played a xylophone with a single horn resonator, along with calabash resonators. Northeast Nigerian cow horn resonators often have holes covered with spider webs to create a buzzing sound.

- Central Africa-type xylophones: consist of a set of wooden planks laid on banana logs. These are becoming increasingly rare since they are less portable.
- Frame xylophones: contain wooden frames and calabash gourd resonators. The Beti people play large ensembles of frame xylophones, which they call mendzaŋ. Also called nzaŋa in Mbum and ǹjáŋ in Bum.

=== Concussion ===
- Concussion sticks: pairs of sticks strung together, and are played by the Oroko, Ejagham, and other peoples. Called ǹjâk in Ejagham.
- Concussion bells: hollow bells, often of different shapes and sizes, strung together on a frame or iron ring (the latter being common in the Mandara Mountains).
- Concussion rings: iron rings strung together on an iron frame. Found in the Mandara Mountains.
- Concussion rattles
  - Small dried fruit shells strung together on a cord and attached to the ankles or waist. Played by the Oroko and other peoples.
  - Large dried fruit shells filled with pellets, found in Foumban and other localities.
  - Pod-shaped iron ankle rattles strung together on an iron ring, played by the Yamba and other peoples.
- Concussion spheres: two spherical dried fruit shells strung together by a cord, typically played by women as rhythmic accompaniments to songs. Called tɛ́rɛ́katɛ́tlí in Bana, and played by the Laamang, Guduf, Mafa, and many other peoples of Cameroon.

=== Others ===
- Scraped idiophones: a stick, wood block, or hollowed raffia midrib with notches is scraped to produce sounds. The Cuban güiro is derived from such instruments. Called kenkpwaà in Noni, kwàkwàr in Limbum, and kwàkwàr in Bamun.
- Friction idiophones: The Noni kèbweè ke coŋ ɛ́, an open cylindrical drum with a stick attached to the inside of the drum, is played as part of the coŋ secret society dance. The stick is rubbed against the skin to produce a squeaking sound. Called ŋgwon in a Bamun secret society. Very rare in Africa, although also reported from the DR Congo.

== Membranophones ==
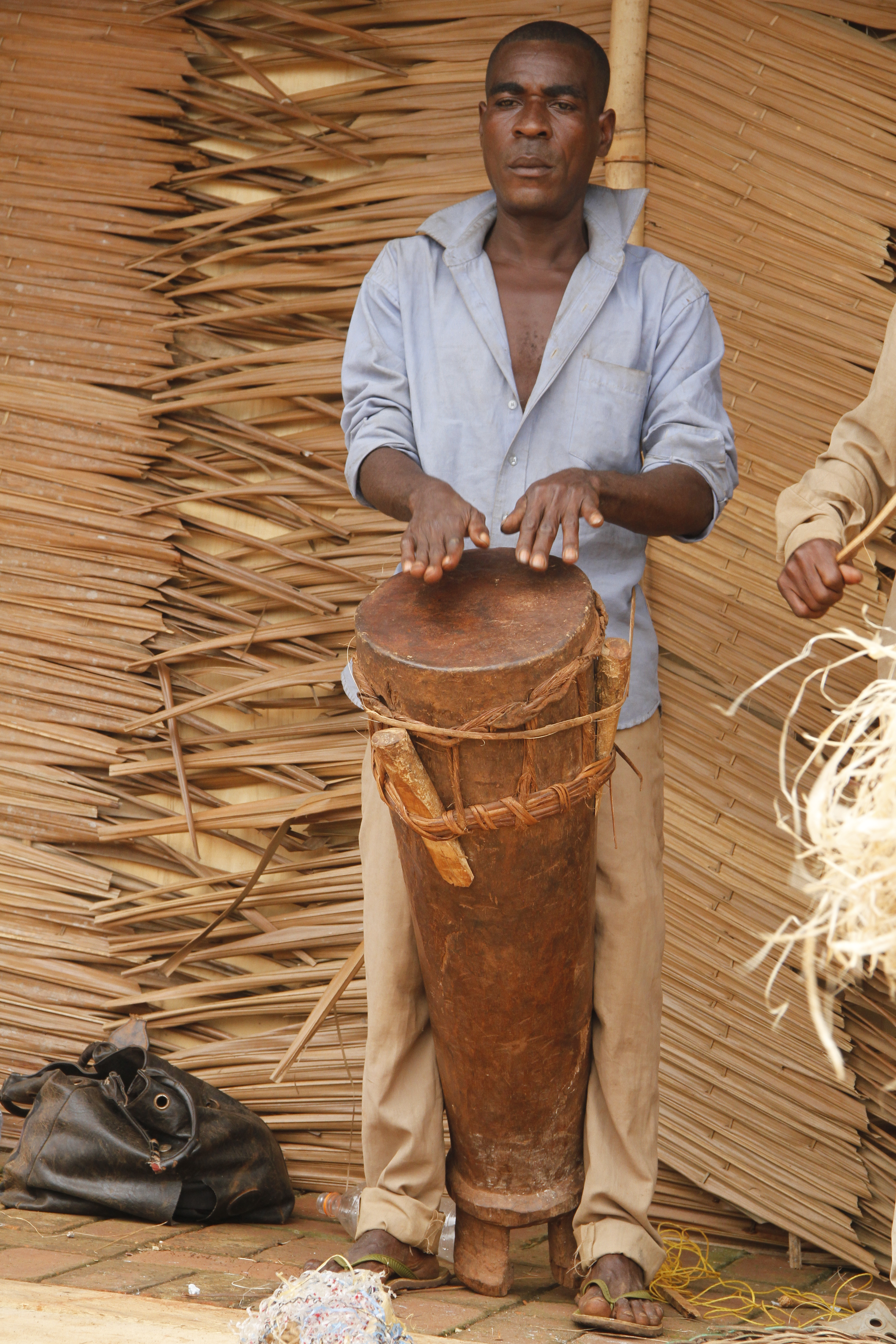
Drummers from southern Cameroon

Membranophones (drums):

- Pegged/nailed drums: Called dali in Mbum, and kèntóm, ǹcùm, ǹtàm in Noni. Also played by the Ngomba (who play them in pairs) and Mbum.
- Laced drums
  - Laced single-headed drums: played by the Fulani and Grassfields peoples. Called muɔ sèm in Ngiemboon.
  - Laced double-headed drums
    - Hourglass drums: played by Muslim peoples in northern Cameroon. Often based on the Hausa kalungu. Originated in the north of Cameroon, but also spread to the south. Called ndinda in Bamun. Also played by the Muyang.
    - Barrel drums: the two heads of the drums are beaten using hands or sticks. Some barrel drums have heads of unequal sizes, while others have equally sized heads. Among the Central Chadic languages, it is called timi or gwenderi in Muyang, tèm in Vame, àtìm in Ouldeme, ʹgaŋgaŋ in Mofu, and gáŋəka or tímé in Podoko.
    - Conical drums: played in parts of northern Cameroon, where it is called madan in Mbum.
- Wedge-laced drums: played only in southern Cameroon, including by the Oroko.
- Screw-tensioned drums: typically conga drums, which originated from the Caribbean and not directly from Africa.

== Chordophones ==
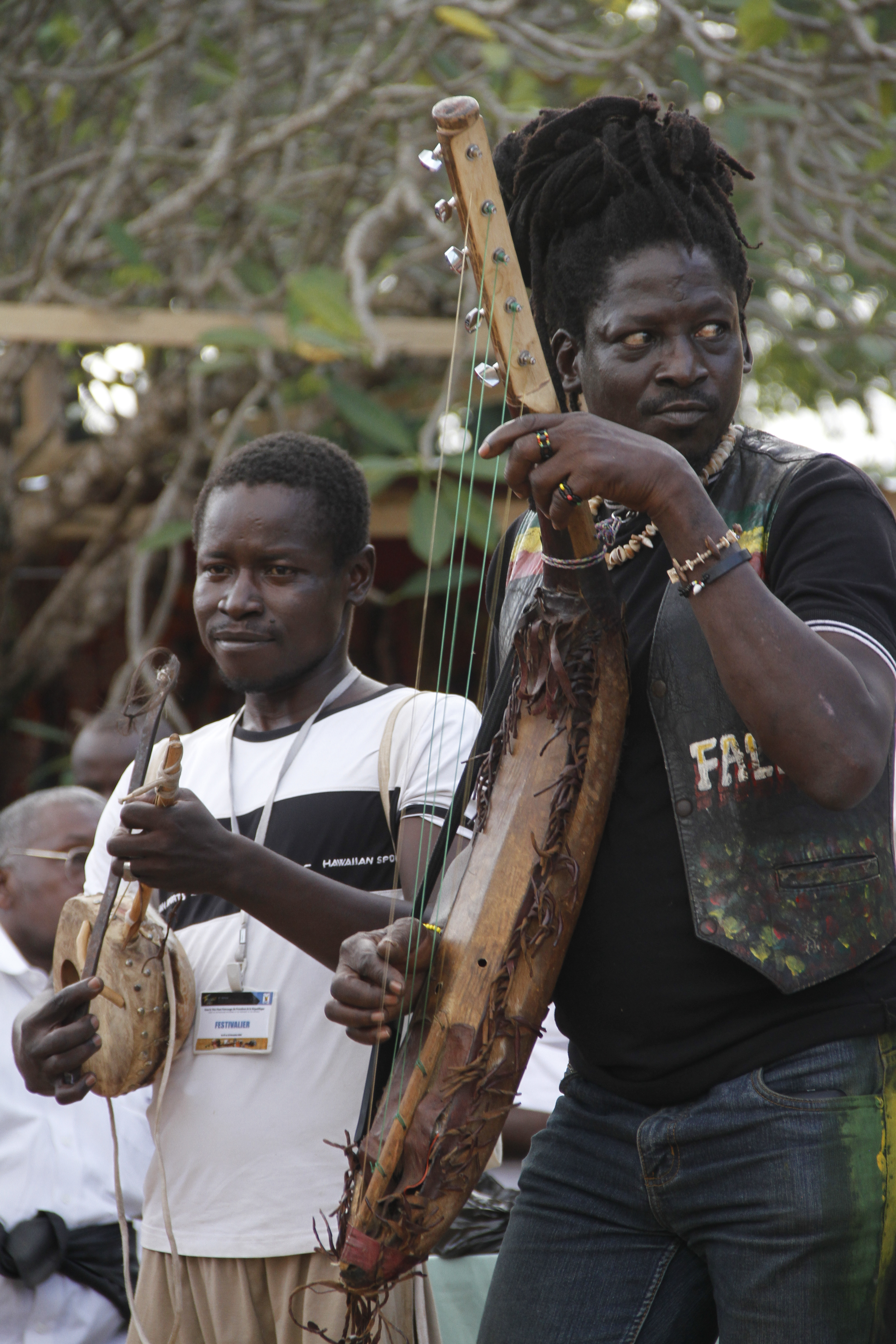
Harp and lute players from northern Cameroon

Chordophones (stringed instruments):

- Musical bow: originally hunting bows with vegetable fiber strings that are resonated in the mouth, and used for personal enjoyment.
- Spike lute: called gúlúm in Lagwan, and also found throughout West Africa.
- Pluriarc: a unique variant of the arched harp in which each string has its own neck. Found in the Grassfields region. Called komè in Noni and paata in Bamun. Called hilun hi kôba in Bassa.
- Mvet: a unique bar zither found only in central Africa (Cameroon, Gabon, and a small part of the DR Congo).
- Arched harp: very widespread in Africa, and likely originated in North Africa several millennia ago. Typically with pentatonic tuning and 5-6 strings in Cameroon, and is especially prevalent in northern Cameroon. Among the Central Chadic languages, it is called tindu in Muyang, kùléndéŋ in Vame, kurndù in Ouldeme, gànjával in Mofu, kélndèw in Mada, and gàzlàmà in Lagwan. See kundi and ngombi in French.
- Earth bows and monochord harps: played by the Ngiemboon and Tsangi.
- Spike fiddle: Called kúkú in Lagwan.

== Aerophones ==
Aerophones (wind instruments) of Cameroon include flutes, trumpets/horns, reed, and other instruments:

=== Flutes ===
- End-blown flutes
  - End-blown flutes without mouthpiece
    - Cylindrical end-blown flutes without mouthpiece: similar to the Arab ney. Called shilashila in Kanuri and mbáyá in Lagwan. In northern Cameroon, it is often made from bark, such as among the Mofu people of the Maroua region.
    - Panpipes: typically played by women in the Mandara Mountains. A 3-pipe version is called zə̀léŋ in Mofu.
    - Conical end-blown flute ensembles: animal horns blown across the top, sometimes with 1-2 fingerholes, and played in ensembles of 5-8 instruments. Found in the Mandara Mountains, the Mbam-speaking areas, and among the Ouldeme people.
    - Cruciform wooden whistle: blown across the top like a panpipe, with two fingerholes on the side. Often played as part of dances and for communication by hunters, and are also part of Brazilian samba music. Called ǹdoŋ in Noni.
    - Vessel flute: made using round calabash gourds and tubular resonators, and played by the Noni.
  - Bevel flutes
    - Bevel flutes without fingerholes: played in the Mandara Mountains.
    - Single-note bevel flute ensemble: played in the Grassfields region, including by the Mankon and Bandjoun peoples.
    - Multiple-note bevel flute ensemble: played in the Mandara Mountains by boys after circumcision ceremonies.
  - Notch flute: the blowing end of the flute has an indented "V" shape. Played by ensembles in the Grassfields region.
- Transverse flute: called odin in Eton. Also played by the Yaounde and other peoples further to the southeast, especially in the DR Congo. Generally rare in Cameroon.
- Duct flute: flutes that make sounds via side openings, like whistles (which can be cylindrical or snail-shaped in Cameroon). Typically used to call for change in movement during dances.

=== Trumpets and horns ===
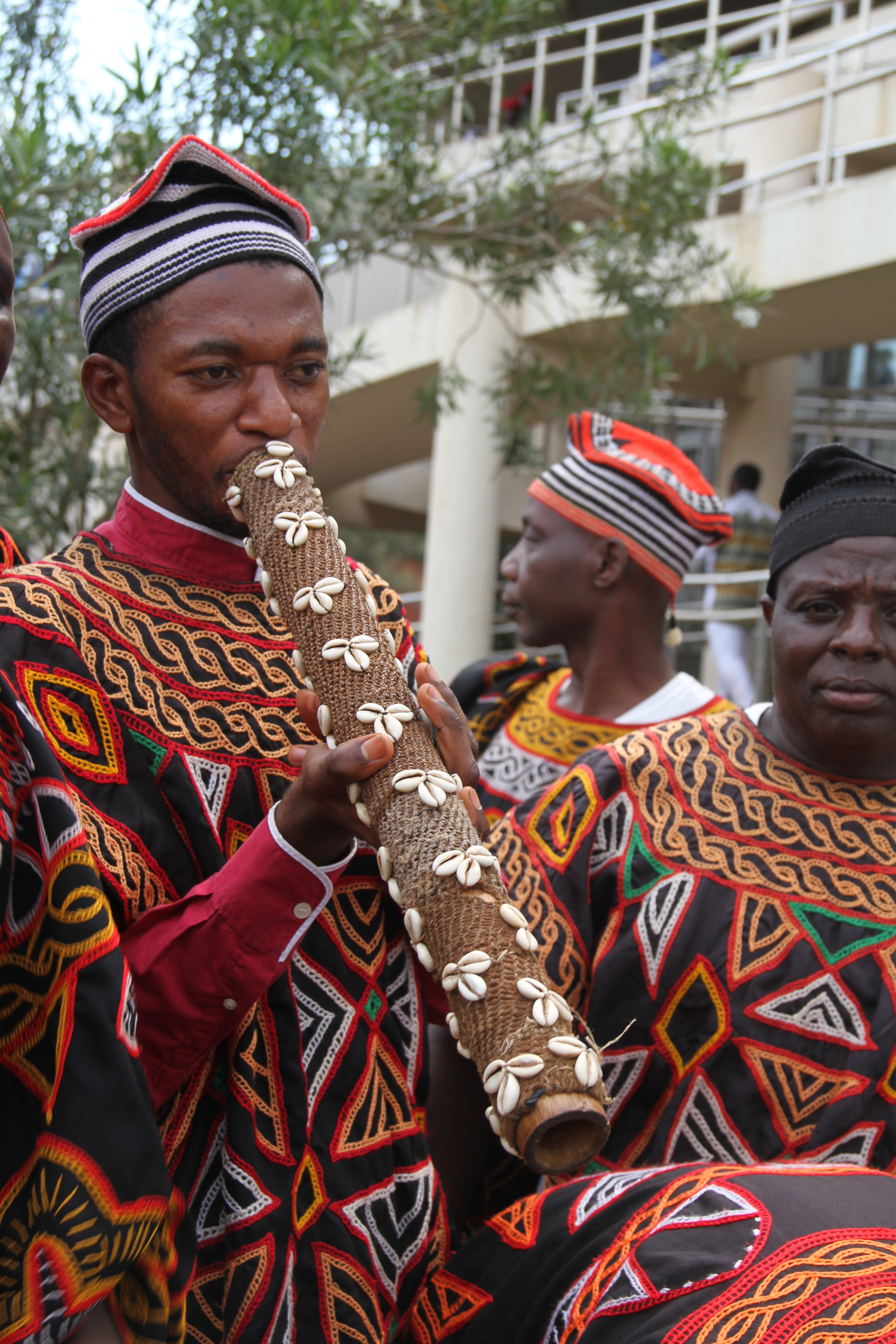
End-blown horn from the Grassfields region of Cameroon

- Trumpets
  - Long metal trumpet: made of bronze, brass, or other metals. Played in pairs or sometimes in groups of up to 6, in northern Cameroonian Islamic courts together with algaita shawms. Also played with end-blown wooden horns in Foumban. Called kakaki in Bamum.
  - Cylindrical trumpet: called kènffuy in Noni, kìnsɨɨ in Limbum, and cǔ in Ngiemboon. Also played by the Bana of the Mandara Mountains.
- Horns
  - Transverse-blown horn: Made using cow horns, antelope horns (historical but now uncommon), ivory (in Grassfields courts), or wood. Usually played by men, such as in courts in the Grassfields, although Oroko women play it. Called kèmbaa in Noni and káál shí in Lagwan.
  - End-blown horn: found in the Grassfields region, but rare in the rest of Cameroon and Africa. In Foumban, the tatat and tiratira types are played. Made from carved wood by the Nso.

=== Reeds ===
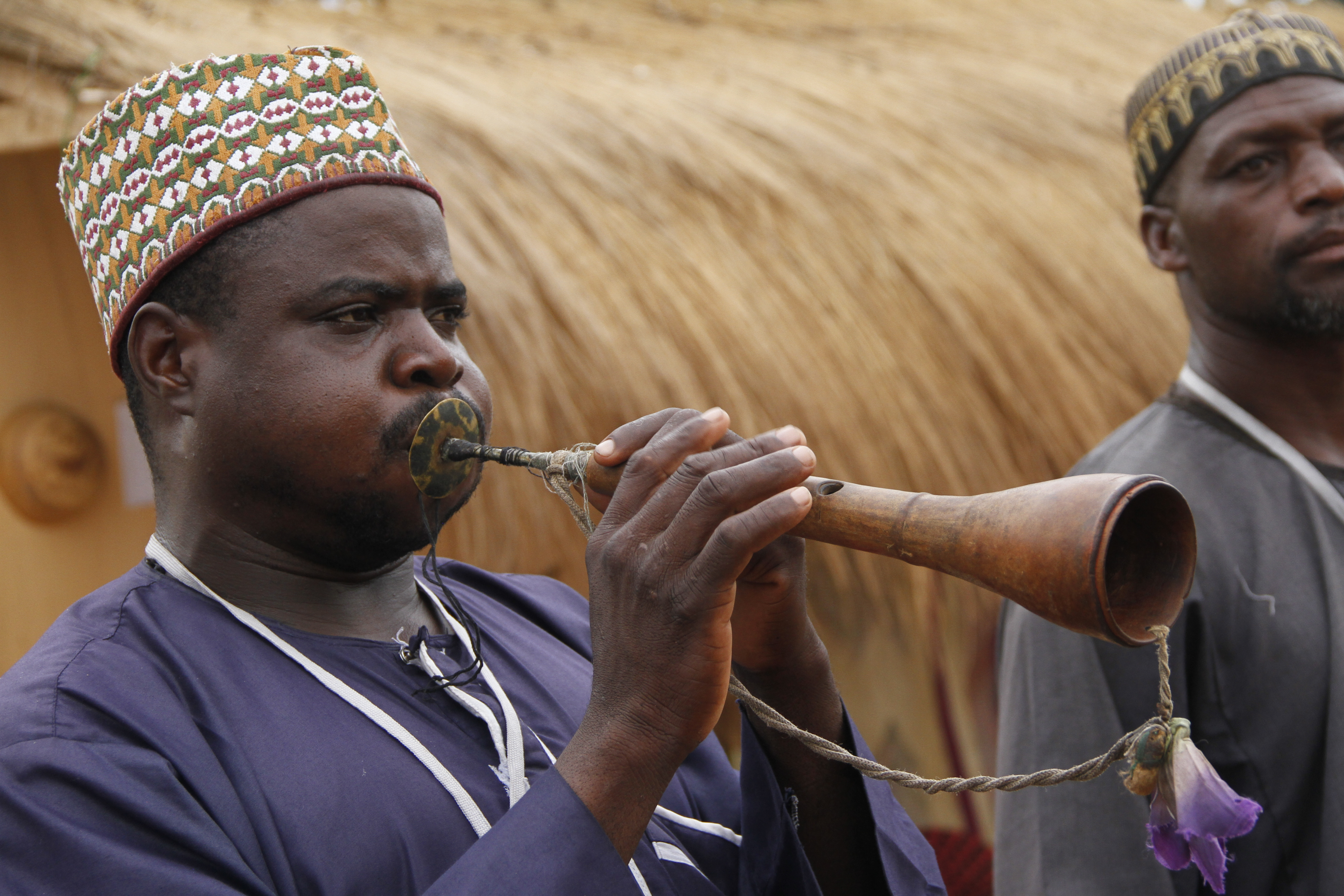
Algaita (shawm) player from northern Cameroon

- Double reeds (shawms): a likely medieval introduction from the Maghreb. Derived from the ghaita of the Maghreb, they are called algaita or alacita and are played in Islamic court ensembles in northern Cameroon, together with long trumpets.
- Single reeds (clarinets): found throughout the Sahel. Calabash gourd resonators are sometimes attached at one end. Often made by children after sorghum harvests. Called líkò in Lagwan.
- Whirling aerophones (bullroarer): flat, diamond-shaped piece of wood with a string attached to it. When spun around, it produces a roaring sound, as if that of a spirit. Often used in secret societies.

=== Others ===
- Percussion aerophones
  - Stamping tubes: long hollow tube used for stamping, like a pestle. One end is closed to allow for stamping. Sounds vary depending on how long or wide the tube is.
  - Percussion vessels
    - Struck spherical vessels: made from dried calabash gourds in Cameroon and from pottery in Nigeria. The pitch can vary depending on the amount of air expelled by striking the vessel. One hand strikes a hole on the top, and another hand strikes a hole on the side. Played by the Ngiemboon and other ethnic groups, often in pairs.
    - Snail shells: dried snail shells with perforated holes that are struck against the body to create various sounds, as the holes are opened and closed. Women use them as rhythmic accompaniments to songs.
- Voice disguisers: used to speak the voices of spirits and ancestors in masquerades, initiation ceremonies, and secret societies. Typically mirlitons, like kazoos, although spherical clay pots and wooden megaphones are also used.

== Lamellophones ==
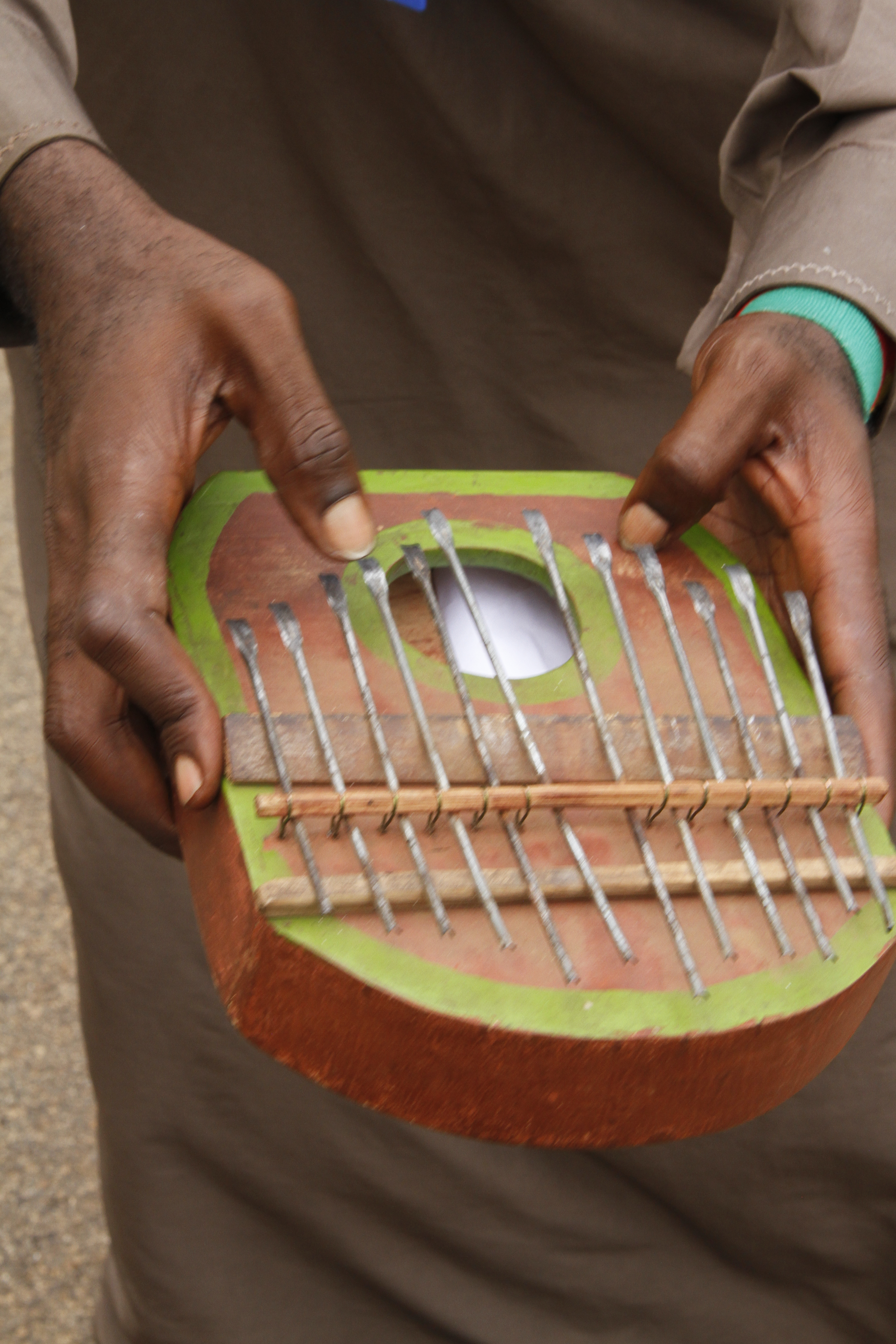
Sansa from western Cameroon

- Sansa (thumb piano): played in the Grassfields region. Called ntákùp in Limbum, mambila in Bamun, and ǹtáká in Noni. Widespread throughout Africa.
- Timbrh: played by the Mambila People

== Musical ensembles ==
- Polyphonic wind ensembles: common throughout sub-Saharan Africa, ranging to West Africa to East Africa, and all the way down to South Africa. Typically wind and percussion instruments (usually flutes, drums, and iron bells in Cameroon), which are played by men in egalitarian societies. Women do not play instruments and only sing if participating.

== See also ==
- Music of Cameroon
- List of musical instruments by Hornbostel–Sachs number
