= Circular breathing =

Breathing technique for wind instruments

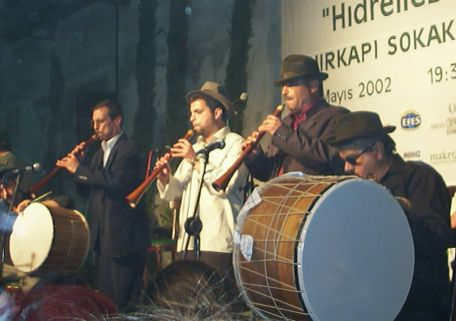
A group of davul and zurna players. The zurna is played using circular breathing.

Saxophonist David Hernando performing Caprice No.5, by Niccolò Paganini, using the circular breathing technique.

Circular breathing is a breathing technique used by players of some wind instruments to produce a continuous tone without interruption. It is accomplished by inhaling through the nose while simultaneously pushing air out through the mouth using air stored in the cheeks.

== History ==
The technique was developed independently by several cultures and is used for many traditional wind instruments.

Mongolian metalsmiths have long used circular breathing on flames to achieve sustained, consistent metal temperatures.

== Uses ==
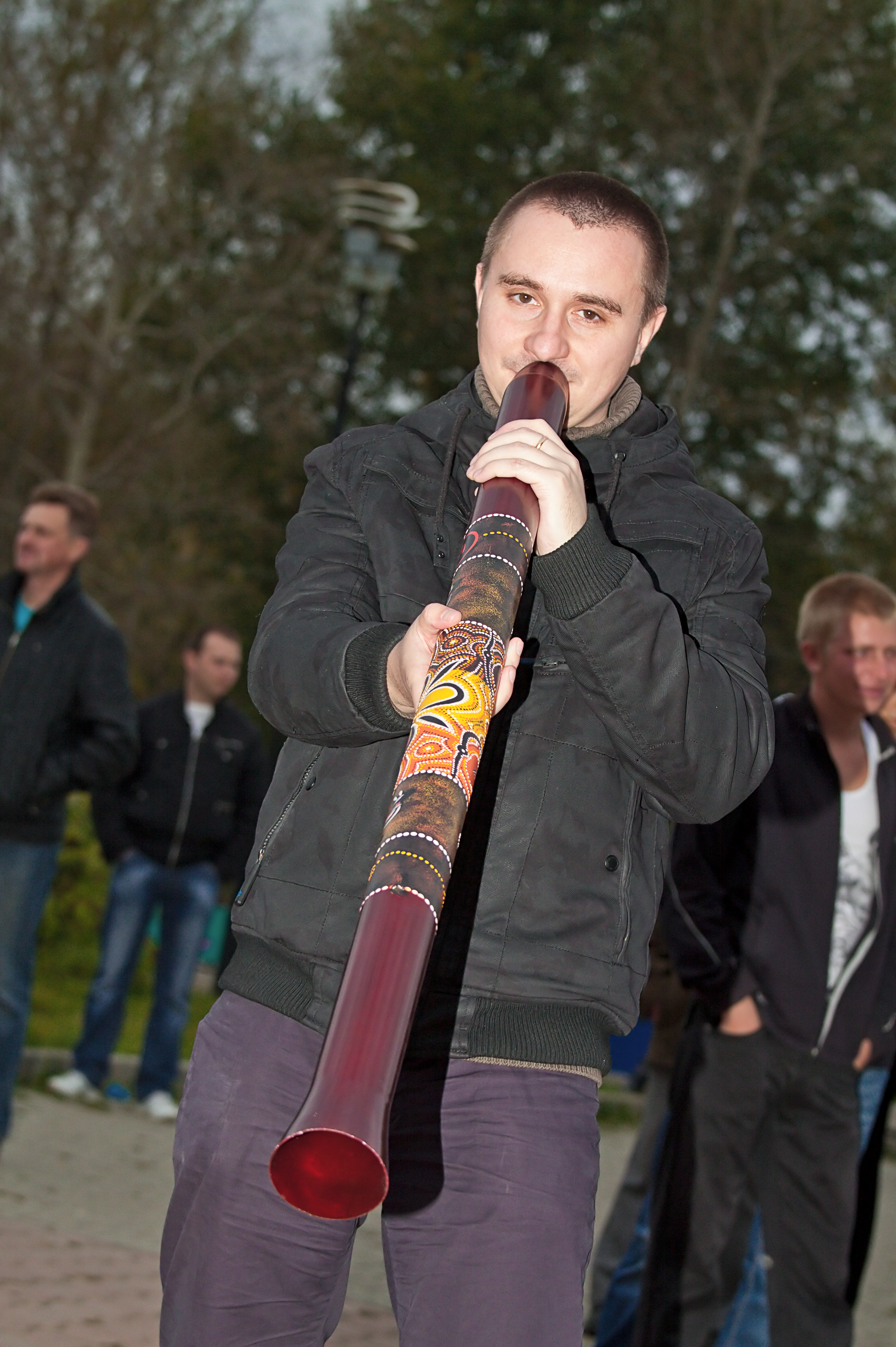
A man playing the didgeridoo

It is used extensively in playing the Eastern zurna, the Mongolian limbe, the Tibetan gyaling, the Sardinian launeddas, the Greek aulos, the Egyptian arghul, the Australian didgeridoo, the Basque alboka, many traditional oboes and flutes of Asia and the Middle East, and the saluang, a traditional bamboo flute from Minangkabau ethnic, West Sumatra, Indonesia. Some jazz and classical wind and brass players also use some form of circular breathing.

Although many professional wind players find circular breathing highly useful, few pieces of European orchestral music composed before the 20th century actually require its use. However, the advent of circular breathing among professional wind players has allowed for the transcription of pieces composed for string instruments containing a series of sustained notes that would otherwise be unplayable on wind instruments. A notable example is "Moto Perpetuo", transcribed for trumpet by Rafael Méndez from the original violin work by Paganini.

In 1997, a Guinness World Record was set for the longest held musical note when Kenny G used circular breathing to sustain an E-flat on a saxophone for 45 minutes and 47 seconds. In February 2000, Vann Burchfield surpassed G's record by playing one note for 47 minutes, 6 seconds.

On his album Didgeridoo Concerto (1994), Mark Atkins played continuous tones for over 50 minutes. On 14 May 2017, Nigerian saxophonist Femi Kuti broke Atkins's record by playing for 51 minutes, 38 seconds.

== Method ==
The musician fully inhales and begins to exhale and blow outward. When the lungs are nearly empty, the last volume of air is blown into the mouth, and the cheeks are inflated with part of this air. Then, while still blowing this last bit of air out by squeezing the cheeks, the musician must very quickly fill the lungs by inhaling through the nose prior to running out of air in the mouth. If done correctly, by the time the air in the mouth is nearly exhausted the musician can begin to exhale from the lungs once more, ready to repeat the process again. Essentially, circular breathing bridges the gap between exhalations with air stored in the cheeks, an extra air reserve to play with while sneaking in a breath through the nose.

== Instruments ==
The following instruments utilize circular breathing:

- Alboka
- Algoze
- Arghul
- Aulos
- Bagpipes
- Bassoon
- Clarinet
- Didgeridoo
- Dizi
- Duduk
- Flute
- Hornpipe
- Kaval
- Kèn bầu
- Khaen
- Khlui
- Launeddas
- Mey
- Mijwiz
- Mizmar
- Oboe
- Pi
- Practice chanter
- Pungi
- Quadruple reed
- Saxophone
- Sipsi
- Sralai
- Saluang
- Suling
- Suona
- Trumpet
- Zurna
