= Gaita =

Gaita may refer to:

== Music ==
- Gaita (bagpipe), various types of bagpipes common to northern Spain and Portugal
- Gaita gastoreña, a hornpipe musical instrument native to El Gastor, Andalusia
- Gaita navarra, a flute named after the Navarre region of Spain
- Gaita Zuliana, a Venezuelan musical genre
- Kuisi, or Colombian gaita, fipple flutes native to Colombia and parts of Panama

== People ==
- Raimond Gaita (born 1946), Australian philosopher and writer

== See also ==
- Gaida, a Balkans bagpipe
- Ghaita or Rhaita, a north-west African shawm like wind instrument
