= Gaita navarra =

Spanish double-reeded flute-like folk musical instrument

The gaita narvarra is a double reeded flute-like folk instrument originating from Navarra, Spain. The gaita narvarra is very similar to the Spanish folk instrument known as the dulzaina. Both are variants of shawms, from Spain. The reeds of the gaita are very similar to bassoon reeds.

While the word gaita is commonly translated from Spanish as "bagpipe", many instruments which share the term in part of their name bear little resemblance to bagpipes. The gaita navarra utilizes double reeds and most resembles an oboe, unable to be considered a true bagpipe in that it lacks a bag or drone.

This instrument is typically played for Processional Giants better known as "Gigantes" or "Erraldoiak" in Euskera.

== See also ==
- Gaita (disambiguation)
