= Zurna =

Wind instrument played in central Eurasia

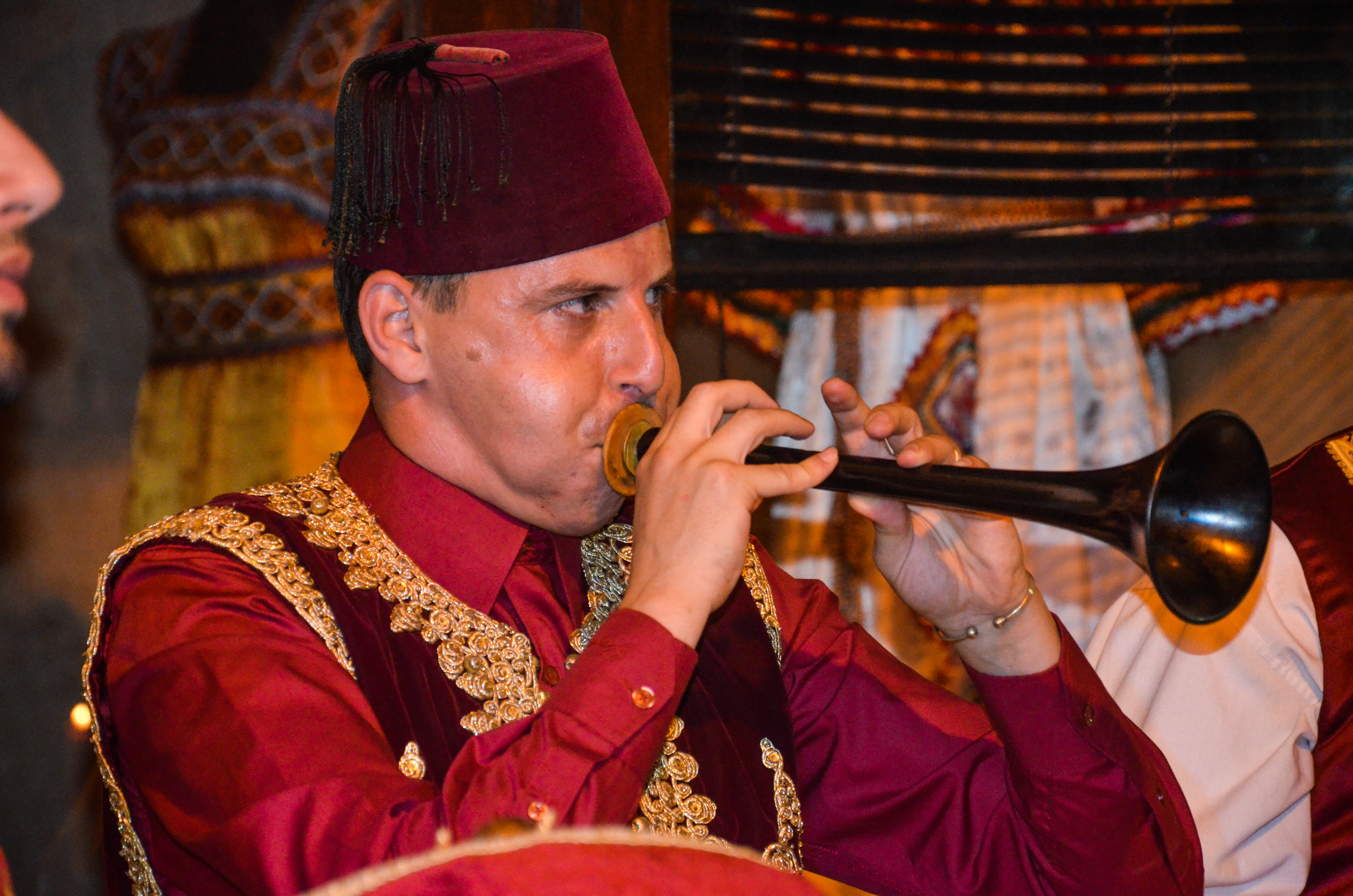
Musician playing the zurna.

The zurna (Note: Also called sunay, birbynė, lettish horn, zurla or zurle, surla, sornai, zournas, zurma, or zurnes.) (Note: Armenian: զուռնա zuṙna; Old Armenian: սուռնայ suṙna; Albanian: surle/surla; Romanian: surlă; Persian: karna/Kornay/surnay; Macedonian: зурла/сурла zurla/surla; Bulgarian: зурна/зурла; Hungarian: zurna/töröksip; Serbian: зурла/zurla; Assyrian: ܙܘܪܢܐ/zurna; Tat: zurna; Turkish: zurna; zirne; Greek: ζουρνάς; Azerbaijani: zurna; Sinhalese: හොරණෑව[horaṇǣva]) is a double reed wind instrument played in West Asia, the Caucasus, Southeast Europe and parts of North Africa. It is also used in Sri Lanka. It is usually accompanied by a davul (bass drum) in Turkish, Armenian, Anatolian, Azerbaijani, Assyrian and Kurdish folk music.

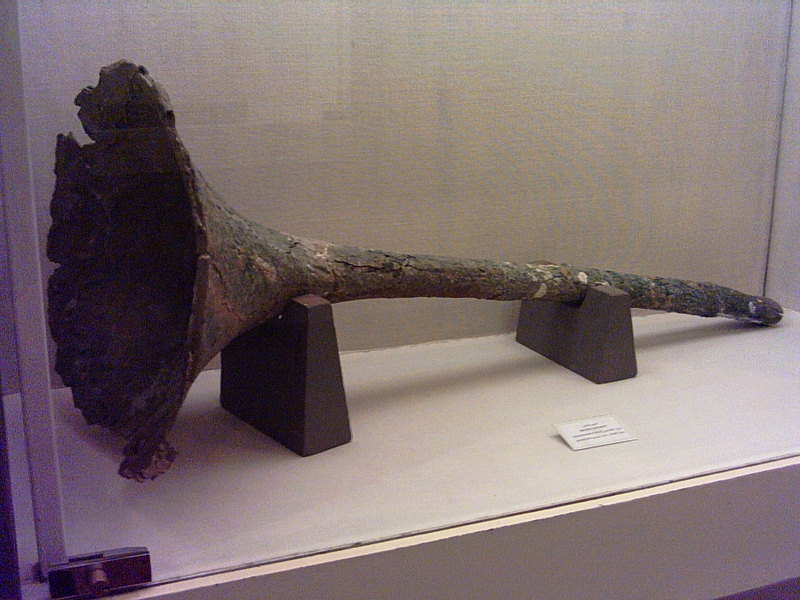
Karana, one of the ancient Iranian musical instruments, 6th century BC, Persepolis Museum.

== Etymology and terminology ==
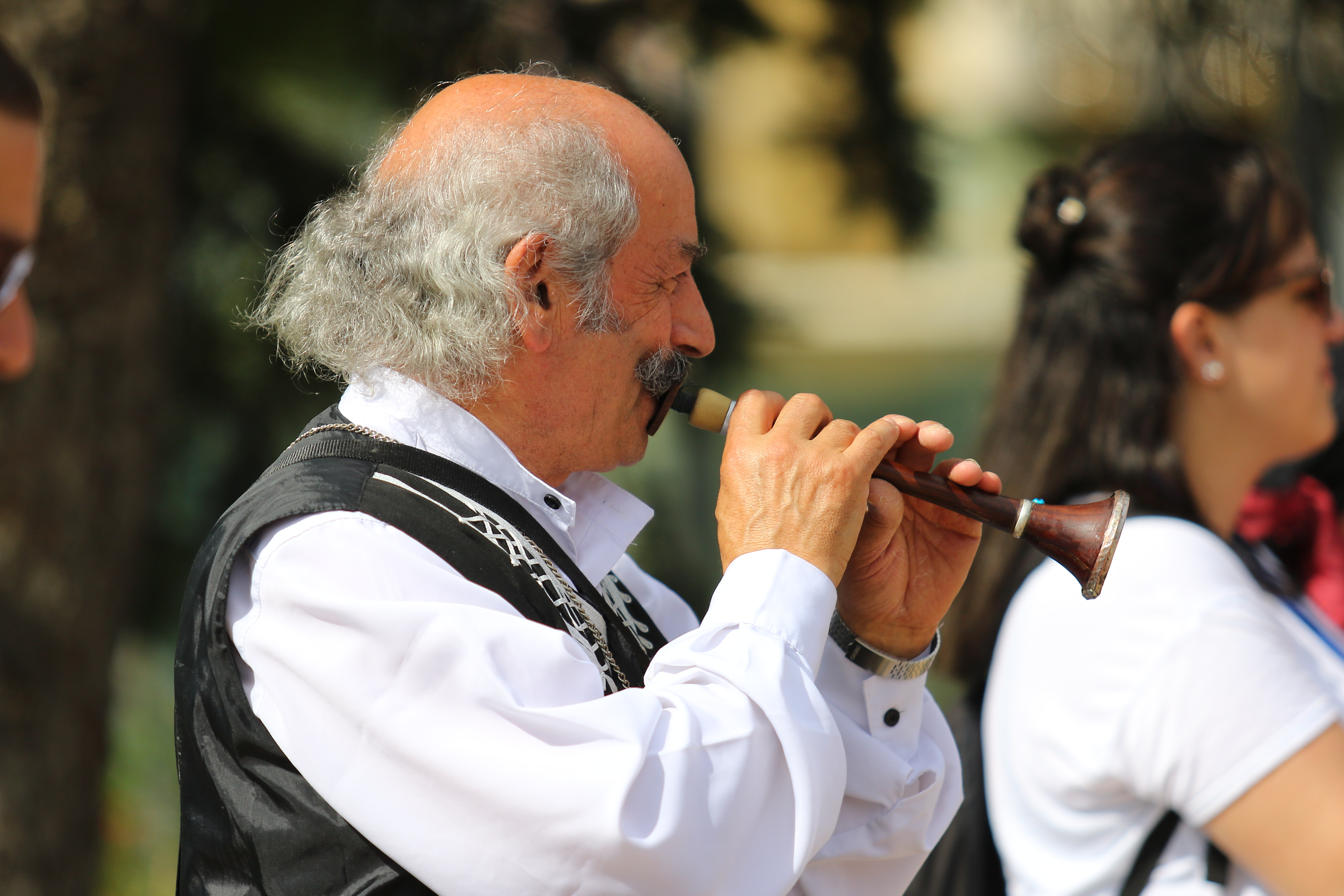
Turkish folk musician playing zurna, 2016

A folk etymology explains that the name is derived from Persian "سرنای" (surnāy), composed of "سور" (sūr) meaning "banquet, feast", and نای (nāy) meaning "reed, pipe". The term is attested in the oldest Turkic records, as "suruna" in the 12th and 13th century Codex Cumanicus (CCM fol. 45a). Zurna has also been suggested as a possible borrowing from Hittite or Luwian into the Armenian language, where Arm. զուռնա zuṙna is compared to Luwian zurni "horn".

== Origins ==
The zurna was said to originate from Central Asia and ancient Asia Minor (Anatolia). Images of the zurna are visible in stone reliefs and artwork by the Hittites, who were an ancient empire from Asia Minor about 2000 to 1200 B.C. It was known in Persia from 6th century A.D., and later introduced in several countries following the spread of Islam (A.D. 650-1500). The zurna played an important role in Ottoman mehter music.

As zurna became popular and intriguing, it spread further to the east and west. In the 16th century, the Central Asian shawms got to China under the name 'sona'. The Kirghiz peoples, from ancient Persia and Afghanistan, had used the zurna, as well as Syrian people, who called it 'zamr'. As the Ottoman Empire sprawled into Europe, the zurna was introduced throughout its Ottoman territories. There were alteration of name and its structure, but the similarities to the original zurna was very apparent, as seen in the Macedonian zurna, called ‘zurla’, and the zurna in North Africa, called 'zmar', of Tunis and Tangier.

In Kurdish and Turkish folk music, the zurna joined with the davul or dihol to appoint a melodic concomitant to tribal and village folk dance. Today, the zurna is an essential part of Turkish folk music and dance, as well as in Armenian dance and Kurdish dance.

Turkish lore says that Adam, who was moulded from clay, had no soul. It is said only the melodious tuiduk-playing of Archangel Gabriel could breathe life into Adam. According to a Turkmen legend, the devil played the main role in tuiduk invention (note the term "devil openings", şeytan delikleri, in Turkish for the small apertures on the bell).

== Characteristics ==
Sound file of kaba zurna from Serres, Greece

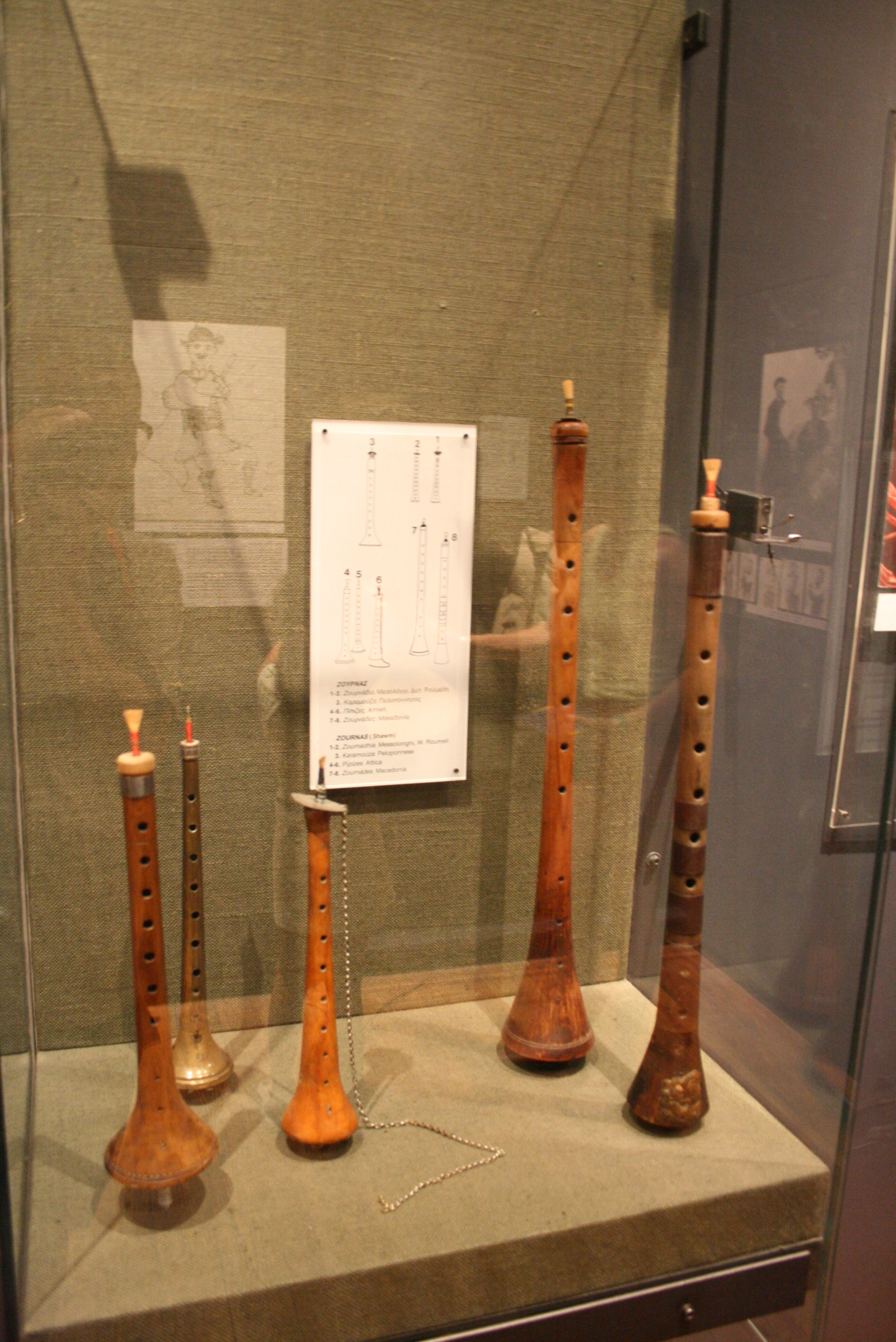
A variety of zurna, from the Museum of Greek Folk Musical Instruments

The zurna, like the duduk and kaval, is a woodwind instrument used to play folk music.

The zurna is made from the slow-growing hardwood of fruit trees such as plum or apricot (Prunus armeniaca). There are several different types of zurnas. The most typical is the Armenian zurna. The longest (and lowest-pitched) is the kaba zurna, used in Bulgaria, the shortest (and highest-pitched), which can be made of bone, is the zurna played in Messolonghi and other villages of Aetolia-Acarnania region in Greece. The zurna, a relative of the oboe, is found almost everywhere where the common reed grows because it uses a short cylindrical reed that is tied to a conical brass tube on one end, flattened to a narrow slit on the other end as a source of the sound.

It requires high pressure to give any tone at all and when it does, it is almost constantly loud, high pitched, sharp, and piercing. The need for high pressure makes it suitable for playing without stop using circular breathing. A small pacifier-style disk that the lips may lean on helps the lip muscles that hold the high-pressure air, rest, and recover during long non-stop playing sessions. The combination of constant volume and non-stop playing makes the zurna unsuitable for emphasis of the rhythm. It has therefore been played almost invariably along with big drums that both provide the rhythm and the lower frequencies that travel further away than the zurna's loud, high pitched sound.

It has a cylindrical bore, and a bell opening out in a parabolic curve, thus adapted to reflect the sound straight ahead. Because of its loud and highly directional sound as well as accompaniment by big drums, it has historically been played outdoors, during festive events such as weddings and public celebrations. It has also been used to gather crowds in order to make official announcements. This use of the zurna as a token of the ruling power developed into Janissary bands and eventually into military music. Seven holes on the front, and one thumb hole, provide a range of over one octave including some transposition.

== Usage ==
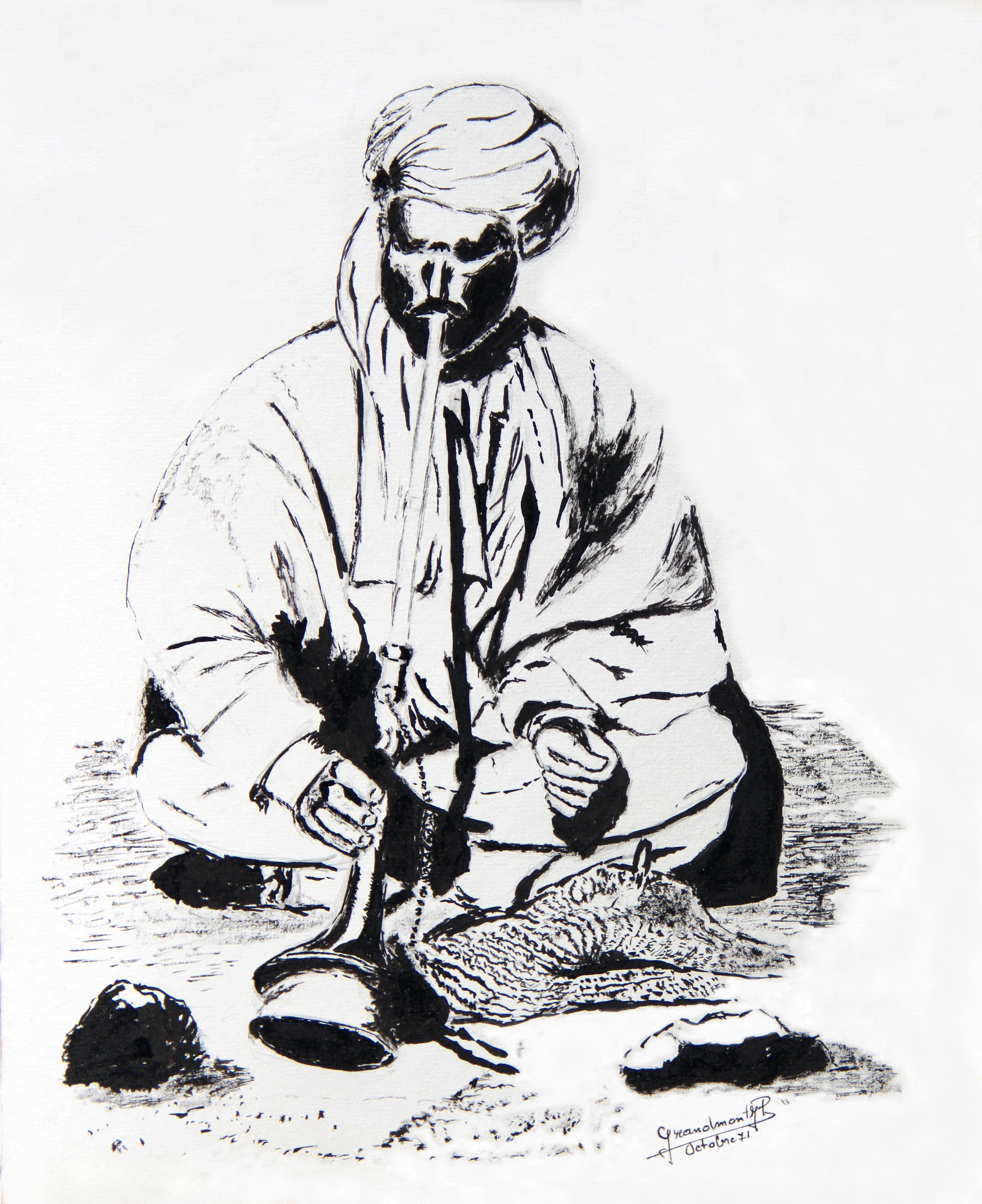
Zurma player (traditional Moroccan wind instrument also called gheita).

Similar to the mizmar and rhaita, zurnas are used in the folk music of many countries and regions, especially in Armenia, Iran, Algeria, Azerbaijan, Central Asia, Iraq, Syria, Turkey, Greece, Bulgaria, North Macedonia, the Maghreb, Albania, Serbia, Bosnia, Kurdistan and the other Caucasian countries.

The zurna is most likely the immediate predecessor of the European shawm, and is related to the Chinese suona still used today in weddings, temple and funeral music. The Japanese charumera, or charamera, traditionally associated with itinerant noodle vendors is a small zurna, its name derived from the Portuguese chirimoya. Few, if any, noodle vendors continue this tradition, and those who do would use a loudspeaker playing a recorded charumera.

A zurna was used by frontman Stu Mackenzie in King Gizzard & the Lizard Wizard's 9th studio album, Flying Microtonal Banana.

The Homeworld series uses a zurna quite extensively in its soundtrack, particularly in more action-focused pieces.

== See also ==
- Pku
- Zhaleika
- Ney
- Sorna
- Kangling
- Sopila
- Piffero
