= Shawm =

Double-reed woodwind instrument

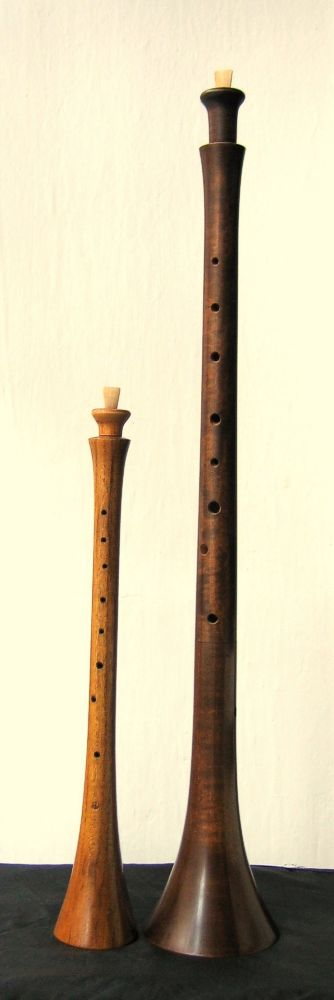
- Classification: Double reed

Related instruments
- Sorna; Rhaita; Aulos; Suona; Sopila; Zurna

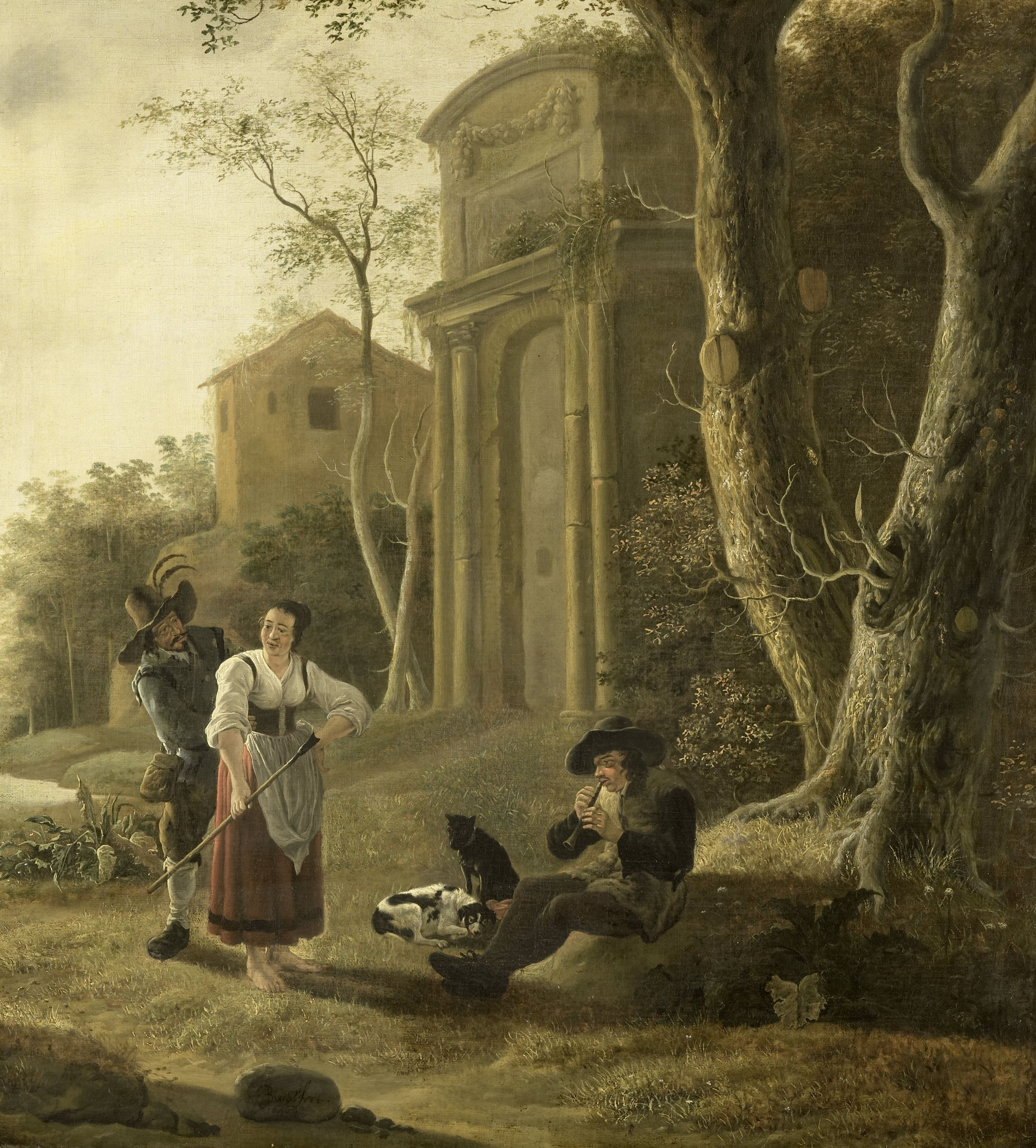
Shepherd playing the shawm (1646), by Jan Baptist Wolffort (Dutch Rijksmuseum)

The shawm (/ʃɔːm/) is a conical bore, double-reed woodwind instrument made in Europe from the 13th or possibly 12th century to the present day. It achieved its peak of popularity during the medieval and Renaissance periods, after which it was gradually eclipsed by the oboe family of descendant instruments in classical music. It is likely to have come to Western Europe from the Eastern Mediterranean around the time of the Crusades. Double-reed instruments similar to the shawm were long present in Southern Europe and the East, for instance the ancient Greek, and later Byzantine aulos, the closely related sorna and zurna, and the Armenian duduk.

The body of the shawm is usually turned from a single piece of wood, and terminates in a flared bell somewhat like that of a trumpet. Beginning in the 16th century, shawms were made in several sizes, from sopranino to great bass, and four- and five-part music could be played by a consort consisting entirely of shawms. All later shawms (excepting the smallest) have at least one key allowing a downward extension of the compass; the keywork is typically covered by a perforated wooden cover called the fontanelle. The bassoon-like double reed, made from the same Arundo donax cane used for oboes and bassoons, is inserted directly into a socket at the top of the instrument, or in the larger types, on the end of a metal tube called the bocal. The pirouette, a small wooden attachment with a cavity in the center resembling a thimble, surrounds the lower part of the reed—this provides support for the lips and embouchure.

Since only a short portion of the reed protrudes past the pirouette, the player has only limited contact with the reed, and therefore limited control of dynamics. The shawm's conical bore and flaring bell, combined with the style of playing dictated by the use of a pirouette, gives the instrument a piercing, trumpet-like sound, well-suited for outdoor performances.

== Etymology ==
Pipita and Zampogna in Calabria (Italy)

In English the name first appears in the 14th century. There were originally three main variant forms, (1) schallemele (shamulle or shamble), (2) s(c)halmys (shalemeyes or chalemyes, all plural forms in Middle English), and (3) sc(h)almuse (or schalmesse), each derived from a corresponding variant in Old French: chalemel, chalemie, and chalemeaux (the plural of chalemel), each in turn derived from the Latin calamus ('reed'), or its Vulgar Latin diminutive form, calamellus. Calamus, in turn, derives from Ancient Greek κάλαμος (kálamos), "reed, cane".

(The name of a somewhat different reed instrument, the chalumeau, also shares this etymology.) The early plural forms were often mistaken for a singular, and new plurals were formed from them. The later reduction in the 15th and 16th centuries to a single syllable in forms such as schalme, shaume, shawme, and finally (in the 16th century) shawm, was probably due to this confusion of plural and singular forms.

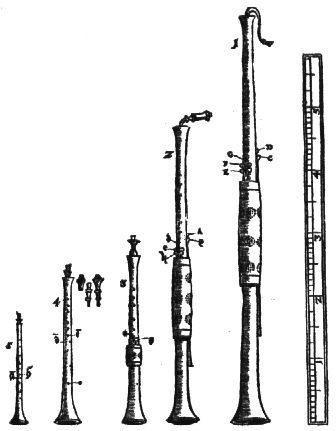
Shawms (from Syntagma Musicum by Michael Praetorius)

In German the shawm is called Schalmei (or for the larger members of the family Bombard—also in English in the 14th century—later corrupted to Bombhardt and finally in the 17th century to Pommer) This is borne out by the very similar names of many folk shawms used as traditional instruments in various European nations: in Spain, many traditional shawms with different names can be found, such as the Castilian, Aragonese, and Leonese dulzaina (sometimes called chirimía, a term that derives from the same Old French word as shawm); the Valencian and Catalan shawms (xirimia, dolçaina, or gralla) or the Navarrese gaita. In Portugal there is an instrument called charamela; and the name of the Italian shawm is ciaramella (or: cialamello, cennamella).

However, it is also possible that the name comes from the Arabic salamiya (سلامية), a traditional oboe from Egypt, as the European shawm seems to have been developed from similar instruments brought to Europe from the Near East during the time of the Crusades. This Arabic name is itself linguistically related to many other Eastern names for the instrument: the Arabic zamr (زمر), the Turkish zūrnā, the Persian surnāy, the Chinese suona, the Javanese saruni, and the Hindu sahanai or sanayi.

== Use ==
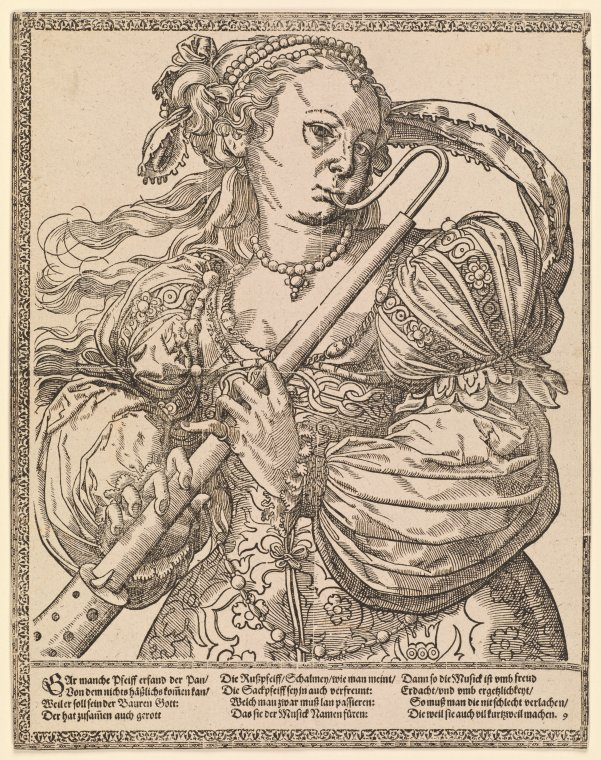
Woman playing a bass shawm (Tobias Stimmer c. 1500)

By the early 16th century the brash tonality of the medieval shawm had been modulated by a narrowing of the bore and a reduction in the size of the fingerholes. This also extended the range, enabling the performer to play the notes in the second octave. Larger sizes of shawm were built, down to the great bass in B♭, two octaves and a major third below the soprano in D. However, the larger sizes were unwieldy, which made them somewhat rare.

The smaller sizes of shawm, chiefly the soprano, alto and sometimes the tenor, were more often coupled with the Renaissance trombone, or sackbut, and the majestic sound of this ensemble was much in demand by civic authorities. The shawm became standard equipment for town bands, or waits, who were required to herald the start of municipal functions and signal the major times of day. The shawm became so closely associated with the town waits (die Stadtpfeifer in German and I pifferi in Italian) that it was also known as the wait-pipe.

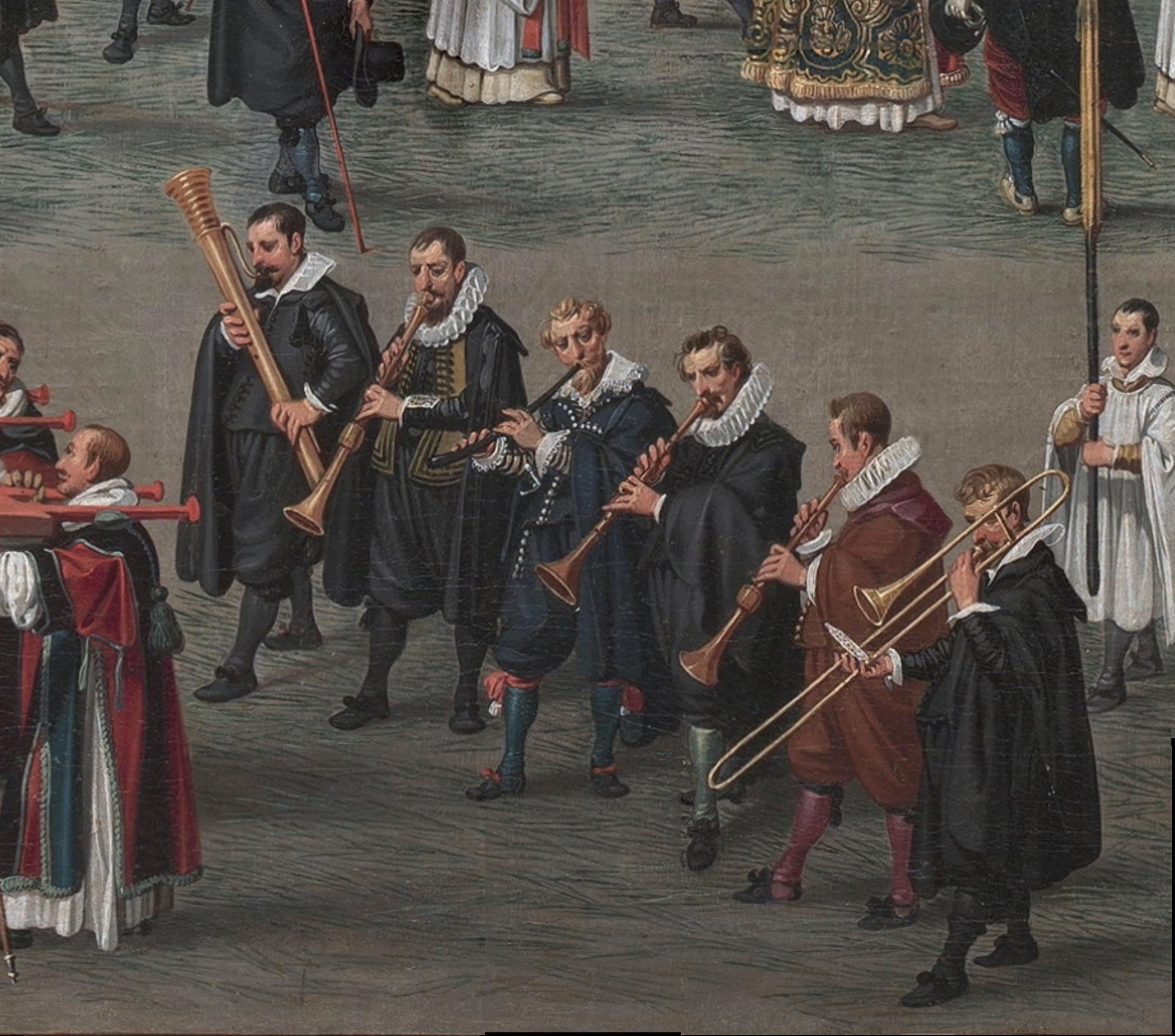
1615, Brussels. Procession of musicians, three with shawms.

Before the discovery of a still shawm aboard the shipwreck of the Mary Rose, instrument historians had been puzzled by references to "still shawms", or "soft" shawms, that were said to have a sound that was less shrill than earlier shawms. The still shawm disappeared from the musical scene in the 16th century; the instrument found on the Mary Rose is the only surviving example. A reproduction has been made and played. Combined with a pipe and tabor, it provides a "very effective bass part" that would have produced "rich and full sound, which would have provided excellent music for dancing on board ship".

The shawm was reserved almost exclusively for outdoor performance—for softer, indoor music, other instruments such as the crumhorn and cornamuse were preferred. These were double reed instruments fitted with a capsule that completely enclosed the reed, which softened the sound but still did not allow for any variation in dynamics.

Known by the Spanish term chirimia, the shawm remains an important ritual instrument among Maya peoples of Highland Guatemala. Accompanied by a drum, the chirimia is frequently used in processions and in certain ritual dances, such as the Dance of the Conquest (Baile de la Conquista), and this is still played today.

== Progeny of the shawm ==
A tenor shawm in C with a single key [without the customary lower extension to G], with a range of a perfect twelfth, was described as a nicolo according to Michael Praetorius in his Syntagma Musicum II (1619), pages 23 and 36, but was not illustrated. Praetorius does, however, illustrate in Plate 13 in the supplementary volume of illustrations, the Theatrum instrumentorum (1620), along with crumhorns, a bassett:nicolo which has the outward appearance of a capped shawm with four keys, but in fact conceals a mostly cylindrical bore. (The range of the bassett: nicolo descended to the A below great C and was just over four feet in length; a shawm of this range, i.e., with a conical bore, would require more than 9 feet of bore length.)

=== Oboe ===
The shawm inspired the later 17th-century hautbois, an invention of the French musician Martin Hotteterre (d. 1712). He is credited with devising essentially a brand-new instrument, one which borrowed several features from the shawm, chiefly its double reed and conical bore, but departed from it significantly in other respects, the most important departure being the fact the player places his lips directly on the reed with no intervening pirouette. Around 1670, the new French hautbois began replacing the shawm in military bands, concert music and opera; by 1700, the shawm had all but disappeared from concert life, although as late as 1830 shawms could still be heard in German town bands performing their municipal functions. Curiously, the Germans and Dutch continued to manufacture an ornate version of the shawm, called deutsche Schalmey, well after the introduction of the French hautbois. Several examples of this instrument survive in European collections, although its exact musical use is unclear.

=== Dulcian/bassoon ===
The 16th-century proclivity for building instruments in a full range of sizes was naturally extended to the shawm, but the extreme length of pipe of the bass instruments meant that few were built and played, due to their cumbersome size. A solution was devised whereby the bore was in effect "folded back" upon itself, creating a much more manageable instrument. The new instrument is often referred to as the dulcian, and was called curtal in England, fagott or fagotto in Germany and Italy, and bajón in Spain. The dulcian, like the first oboes, employed direct lip-to-reed contact, which allowed for much greater control over the sound than was offered by shawms. This led to the dulcian becoming very popular, serving as a bass both to the other shawms and even to indoor ensembles that did not feature shawms, afforded by its ability to play quietly. The dulcian was the forerunner to the bassoon, which like the oboe was a Baroque invention.

=== Charumera ===
The charumera (チャルメラ), or charumeru (チャルメル), is a double-reed instrument in traditional Japanese music descended either from shawms brought to Japan by Portuguese Christian missionaries, or possibly Iberian traders in the 16th century. It is sometimes used in kabuki theatre performances. It is also strongly associated in popular culture with street vendors of ramen, who played a distinctive melody on it to attract customers.

== Modern performances ==
- Instruments of the Middle Ages and Renaissance—David Munrow and The Early Music Consort of London
- City of Lincoln Waites (The Mayor of Lincoln's own Band of Musick)
- Many recordings by Blackmore's Night, and Piffaro, The Renaissance Band feature shawms

== See also ==
- Bombard, a shawm of Brittany
- Gyaling, a Tibetan shawm-type instrument
- Hirtenschalmei or "shepherd's shawm"
- Hornpipe, a similar instrument with bagpipe fingering
- Piffero, a similar instrument from Italy which is still used in Italian folk music
- Taepyeongso, a shawm-type instrument used in folk music in Korea

== Bibliography ==
- Baines, Anthony. 1967. Woodwind Instruments and Their History, third edition, reprinted with corrections 1977, with a foreword by Sir Adrian Boult. London: Faber & Faber ISBN 0-571-08603-9. Unaltered reprinted, New York: Dover Publications, 1991.
- Baines. 1991..
