= Suona =

Chinese double-reeded horn

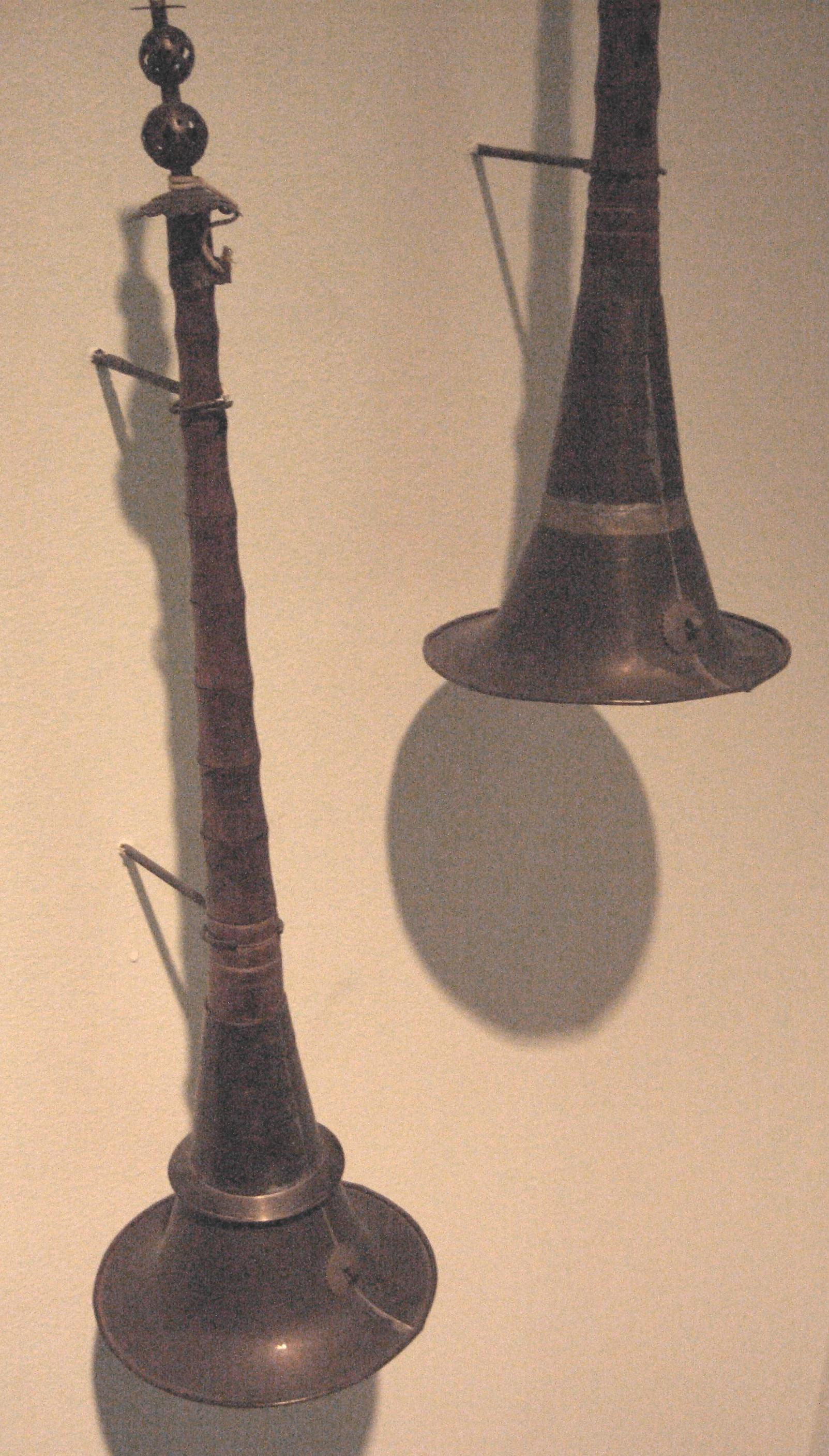
- Classification: Double reed

Related instruments
- Sorna; Rhaita; Sopila; Zurna

Sound sample

Suona
- Traditional Chinese: 嗩吶
- Simplified Chinese: 唢呐
Transcriptions
Standard Mandarin
- Hanyu Pinyin: suǒnà
- Gwoyeu Romatzyh: suoonah
- IPA: [swònâ]

Laba
- Chinese: 喇 叭
Transcriptions
Standard Mandarin
- Hanyu Pinyin: lǎbā
- Gwoyeu Romatzyh: laaba

Haidi
- Chinese: 海 笛
Transcriptions
Standard Mandarin
- Hanyu Pinyin: hǎidí
- Gwoyeu Romatzyh: haedyi

Dida
- Chinese: 啲 打
Transcriptions
Yue: Cantonese
- Yale Romanization: di1 da2

The suona, (Note: /swoʊˈnɑː/) also called dida, (Note: from Cantonese 啲咑 or 啲打, Cantonese pronunciation: [dīdá]) laba or haidi, is a traditional double-reeded Chinese musical instrument. The suona's basic design originated in ancient Iran, then called "Sorna". It appeared in China around the 3rd century and it's also popular in parts of northern and southern China, including Shandong, Henan, Hebei, Shanxi, Shaanxi, Gansu, Northeast China, Guangdong, Fujian, and other regions. It has a distinctively loud and high-pitched sound, and was used frequently in Chinese traditional music ensembles, particularly in those that perform outdoors. It was an important instrument in the folk music of northern China, particularly in provinces of Shandong and Henan, where it has long been used for festival and military purposes. It is still being used, in combination with sheng mouth organs, gongs, drums, and sometimes other instruments in weddings and funeral processions. Such wind and percussion ensembles are called chuida (Chinese: 吹打; pinyin: chuīdǎ; Zhuyin Fuhao: ㄔㄨㄟ ㄉㄚˇ) or guchui (鼓吹; gǔchuì; ㄍㄨˇ ㄔㄨㄟˋ; this name refers to the suona itself in Taiwanese Hokkien). It was also common in the ritual music of Southeast China. In Chinese culture it was an essential element of ritual music that accompanied Daoist performances of both auspicious and inauspicious rites, i.e., those for both the living and the dead. One of the most famous pieces that uses suona as the leading instrument is called Bǎiniǎocháofèng (百鳥朝鳳), or "Hundred Birds Worship the Phoenix". The movie Song of the Phoenix casts the rise and fall of the popularity of suona in modern Chinese musical history. Suona music is filled with tradition and innovation, and is a timeless expression of Chinese folk culture, enriching the daily lives of folk workers. In Mainland China, Suona art was approved by the Chinese State Council to be included in the first batch of national intangible cultural heritage list on May 20, 2006.

== Construction ==
The suona as used in China had a conical wooden body, similar to that of the gyaling horn used by the Tibetan ethnic group, both of which used a metal, usually a tubular brass or copper bocal to which a small double reed was affixed, and possessed a detachable metal bell at its end. The double-reed gave the instrument a sound similar to that of the modern oboe. The traditional version had seven finger holes. The instrument was made in several sizes. The suona has a bright tone, a loud volume, and a wooden tube in a round and cone-shaped shape. The upper end is equipped with a copper tube with a whistle, and the lower end is covered with a copper bell mouth. The Ní zi (呢子; 'woolen fabric'), a related instrument that was most commonly used in northern China, consisted of a suona reed (with bocal) that was played melodically. The pitches were changed by the mouth and hands.^{video} Sometimes the nizi was played into a large metal horn for additional volume. Take apart the tube, whistle, and horn to play, and each can simulate different characters, such as Laosheng, Huadan, and other voices.

=== Modern Construction ===
Since the mid-20th century, "modernized" versions of the suona have been developed in China; incorporating mechanical keys similar to those of the European oboe, to allow for the playing of chromatic notes and equal tempered tuning (both of which were difficult to execute on the traditional suona). There is now a family of such instruments, including the zhōngyīn suǒnà (中音 嗩吶; "Alto suona"), Cì zhōng yīn suǒnà (次中音唢呐; "Tenor suona") , and dīyīn suǒnà (低音 嗩吶; "Bass suona"). These instruments are used in the woodwind sections of modern large Chinese traditional instrument orchestras in China, Taiwan, and Singapore, though most folk ensembles prefer to use the traditional version of the instrument. It is used in modern music arrangements as well, including in the works of Chinese rock musician Cui Jian, featuring a modernized suona-play in his song "Nothing To My Name" (一无所有; Yīwúsuǒyǒu; 'nothing') played by the saxophonist Liu Yuan. In 1993, the famous wind musician Guo Yazhi invented the "live core" device for suona, which allowed traditional suona to play a chromatic scale and twelve tone system, enriching its expressive power.

Ranges of the orchestral "suona":

- Piccolo suona in G, F and Eb (海笛; hǎidí)
- Sopranino suona in D, C and Bb (高音; gāoyīn)
- Soprano suona in A and G ((大唢呐; dàsuǒnà)
- Alto suona in F (中音; zhōngyīn)
- Tenor suona in C (次中音; cìzhōngyīn)
- Bass suona in various keys (F, Eb etc) (低音; dīyīn)
- Contrabass suona
- Octocontrabass suona

The alto, tenor and bass varieties are normally keyed and the soprano varieties are sometimes keyed. The highest varieties are not normally keyed, but there are variants of them – usually in the key of C – that are keyed to assist in the playing of accidentals. The note played when the left hand's fingers and right index finger are covering the playing holes is considered the key of the instrument.

=== Use inside China ===
In modern, most of the performances of the suona are performed at funerals, or in national orchestras because the suona has a unique tone, a strong penetrating power, and a strong infectious power. For example, in the classic Suona piece Bai Niao Chao Feng (百鸟朝凤), which is performed in orchestra.

=== Influence of suona on young people in the 21st century ===
Because of its unique sound, the suona has become a popular instrument among young people today, as they can use traditional instruments to perform the modern repertoire. Nowadays, suona appears in band performances, festival performances, music programs, movies (including Ne Zha 2), and is generally enjoyed by young people.

== History ==
=== Origins ===
Although the origin of the suona in China is unclear, with some texts dating the use of the suona as far back as the Jin dynasty (266–420), there is a theory that the suona originated outside of the domains of ancient Chinese kingdoms, possibly having been developed from Central Asian instruments such as the sorna or zurna, from which its Chinese name may have been derived. Other sources state the origins of the suona were Arabia, or India. A musician playing an instrument very similar to a suona was shown on a drawing on a Silk Road religious monument in the western Xinjiang province. It dates to the 3rd or 5th centuries, and depictions dating to this period found in Shandong and other regions of northern China depicted it being played in military processions, sometimes on horseback. It was not mentioned in Chinese literature until the Ming Dynasty (1368–1644), but by this time, the suona was already established in northern China. During the Ming and Qing dynasties, it was widely circulated among the people and was mostly used in wind and percussion bands for weddings, funerals, and happy events. It was also used as an accompaniment instrument for folk songs, dances, and operas.

Other instruments related to the suona may have also descended from the Asian zurna, such as the European shawm. Other examples include the Korean taepyeongso, the Vietnamese [[Bầu|kèn bầu]] and the Japanese charumera (Japanese: チャルメラ, lit. 'Suona'). The latter's name is derived from charamela, the Portuguese word for shawm. Its sound was well known throughout Japan, as it is often used today by street vendors selling ramen.

=== Use outside China ===
The suona was used as a traditional instrument by Cubans in Oriente and Havana, having been introduced by Chinese immigrants during the colonial era. Known locally as corneta china, it has been one of the lead instruments in the conga carnival music of Santiago de Cuba since 1915. In Havana, the term "trompeta china" (Spanish: trompeta china, lit. 'Chinese trumpet') was sometimes used.

In America, the jazz saxophonist Dewey Redman often played the suona in his performances, calling it a "musette". English bassist and saxophonist Mick Karn used the instrument crediting it as a dida.

In Central Asia, Egypt, Türkiye, India and other countries, suona is very popular. Suona from Central Asian countries is also used for red and white celebrations, temple fairs, celebration ceremonies, and so on.

The same instrument, also called a "musette", was used in "Oriental Bands" of the Shriner fraternal organization. Dressed in "Arabic" garb with mallet drums, Oriental Bands marched in parades that featured "little cars" driven by members. They wore the Fez (hat). They arrested bystanders, gave them a whisky and let them go. The instrument was not known to be of Chinese origin, just "Oriental". Dewey Redman possibly got his soprano suona as a former Shriner import. The Shriners even supplied the reeds (which are a constant issue because every reed is different).

== Playing style ==
There are many different ways to play the suona, as each region's suona will be different. Modern improvements have even changed the way it is made, adding keys to enhance the range and stability of the suona.

The most important aspect of the suona playing style is the breathing method, and there are currently six ways to play it:

- Circular breathing method
- Air trill
- Tooth trill
- Finger trill
- Small-arm trill
- Tongue trill

== Notable performers ==
- Liu Qi-Chao (刘起超; Liúqǐchāo)
- Liu Yuan (刘元; Liú Yuán), saxophonist with Cui Jian's band, who trained on the suona at the Beijing Art School (北京美术学院; Běijīng měishù xuéyuàn; 'Beijing Academy of Fine Arts'), and who used the instrument on Cui's 1994 album Hongqi xia de dan (红色旗帜下的球; Hóngsè qízhì xià de qiú; 'Balls Under the Red Flag')
- Liu Ying (刘英; Liú Yīng), pioneer of Liu-style suona art

== Repertoire of the suona ==
- “Quan Jia Fu" （全家福）
- “Tai Hua Jiao” （抬花轎）
- “Liu Zi Kai Men” （六字開門）
- “Yi Zhi Hua” （一枝花）
- “Feng Yang Ge Jiao Ba Ban” （鳳陽歌絞八板 ）
- “Tian Yue” （天乐）

== See also ==
- Traditional Chinese musical instruments
- Guan (instrument)
- Lingm
- Zurna
- Piccolo oboe
- Rhaita
- Kangling
- Sopila
- Shehnai
