= Rhaita =

Musical instrument

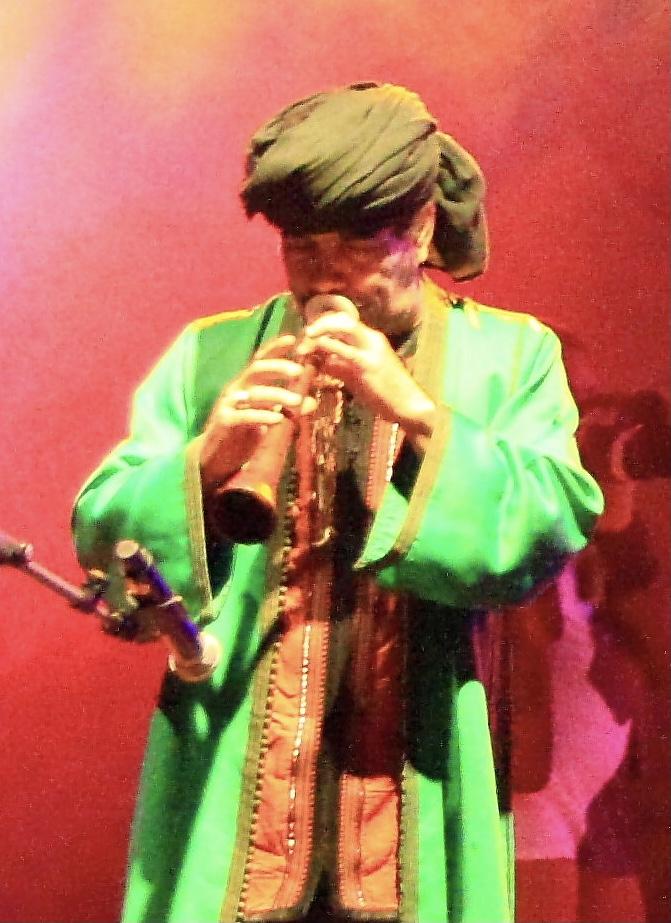
- rhaita or ghaita (Arabic: غيطة)
- Other names: Ghaita
- Classification: Double reed

Related instruments
- Dulzaina; Sorna; Rhaita; Suona; Sopila; Zurna

Video of ghaita music in a wedding in the city of Salé, Morocco - November 2025

The rhaita or ghaita (Arabic: غيطة, romanized: ghayṭa) is a double reed instrument from the Maghreb, specifically Morocco, Algeria, Libya, Mauritania, and occasionally Tunisia. It is nearly identical in construction to the Arabic mizmar and the Turkish zurna. The distinctive name owes to a medieval Gothic-Iberian influence. In southern Iberia, various sorts of wind instruments, including the related shawm, are known as gaitas, but in northern Iberia gaita refers only to bagpipes.

The rhaita was featured in The Lord of the Rings soundtracks by Howard Shore, specifically in the Mordor theme. American composer John Corigliano calls one of the movements of his 1975 Concerto for Oboe and Orchestra "Rhaita Dance", asking the oboist to imitate a rhaita by pushing the reed further into their mouth. In 1981 while composing the soundtrack to Altered States Corigliano again called for oboists to mimic the rhaita sound during Three Hallucinations.

== See also ==
- Mizmar (instrument)
- Sopila
- Sorna
- Suona
- Zurna
