= Sorna =

Iranian woodwind musical instrument

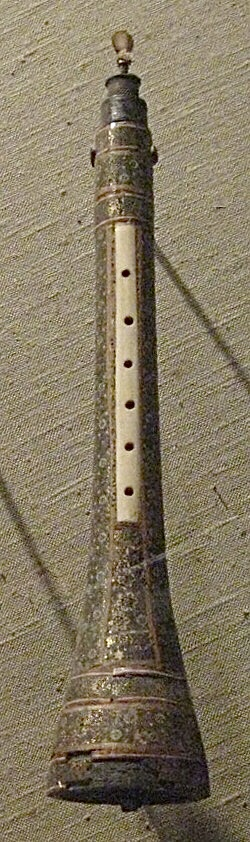
- Classification: Double reed

Related instruments
- Shawm; Rhaita; Suona; Sopila; Shehnai; Zampogna; Zurna; Mey (instrument)

The sornā or sornāy (Persian: سُرنای، سُرنا, also سورنای، سورنا surnā, surnāy and also Zurna) is an ancient Iranian woodwind instrument.

== Etymology ==
The word was most likely borrowed from an unknown Indo-European cognate of Luwian 𒍪𒌨𒉌 (zurni, “horn”), Sanskrit शृङ्ग (ṡṛṅga, “horn”), Latin cornū, and English horn, probably ultimately from Proto-Indo-European *ḱerh₂-. A folk etymology explains that the word sorna is a Pahlavi derivative of sūrnāy (literally "strong flute"), which is a compand of 'sūr-' (strong) and '-nāy' (flute). According to such folk etymology, it was called "strong flute" due to its double-reed-construction rather than usual nāy (Persian: نای), which was made of a single tube of cane, while another folk etymology believes that the first part of word of sorna, is from sūr- again from Pahlavi and New-Persian, meaning the "banquet, meal and feast", thus the "banquet-flute".

"Sorna", being a cognate of "Horn", can simply mean horn. This is a result of the Centum-Satem isogloss, and later Grimm's Law. Even in Persian there is another wind instrument whose name appears to be a cognate of both "Sorna" and "Horn", called "Karnā(y)" (کرنای/کرنا); this may stem from a re-borrowing from another language.

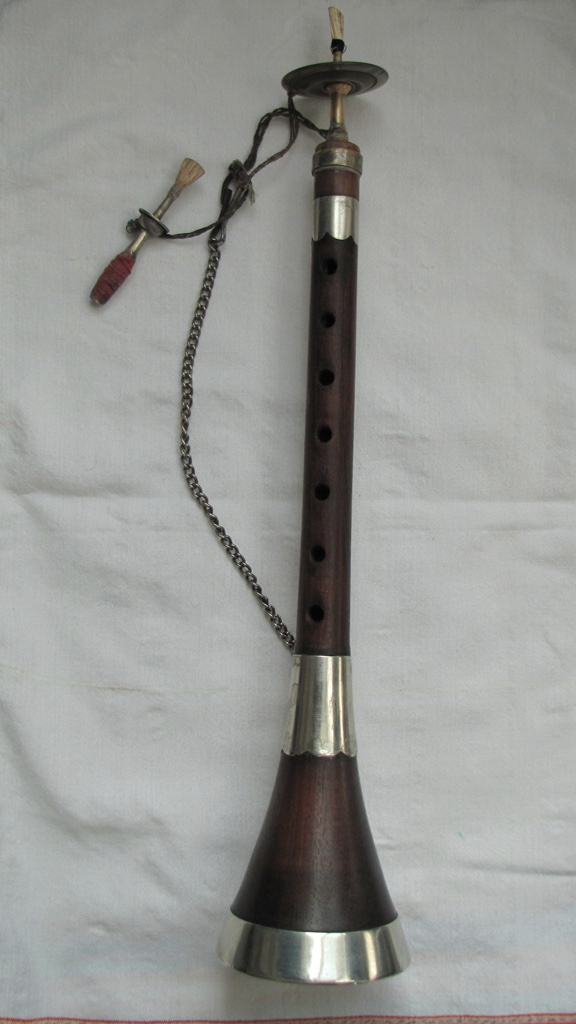
Modern surna, from Hamadan

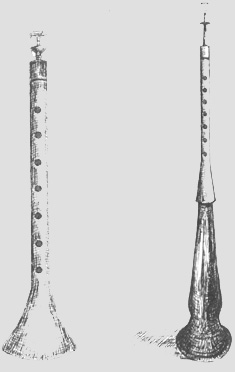
Sorna, Ancient Persian/Iranian woodwind musical instrument

== History ==
The instrument's history dates back to the Achaemenid era (550–330 BCE), and was used to play at the end of the day from the city gate or from the local administration building. This custom persisted in England until the 19th century, the town waits playing shawms to mark the hours. The instrument was mainly played in outdoors in regional music of Iran in the festive ceremonies (the Persian poet Molana Rumi mentioned the sorna and dohol in his poems).

The Achaemenid sorna was a large trumpet-like instrument, but in later dates was reduced in size, and became more shrill like the oboe, or dozale (double oboe), which is characterized by a turned wood body of simple shape, with a heavily flared bell. The earlier was categorized as a trumpet, but this was a mistaken idea based on the bell of the oboe and the freeblowing embouchure that often gives a superficial resemblance to a brass embouchure, particularly if the oboe is fitted as so many are with a lip ring.

According to the Shahnameh, it was King Jamshid who devised the Sornā. Except the literary evidences, there are also a number of artefacts from the Sasanian era (224–651 CE), depicting Sorna, such a silver dish, currently in Hermitage Museum.

== Function ==
A small amount of air is forced under pressure through a small metal tube called the staple which serves to hold the reed and match it to the bore. This requires the player to make sure, as in oboe playing, that one also empties the lungs of stale air when taking a new breath.

Often sornas were played in pairs, with a melody and a drone player. This drone may move to different notes during a piece of music, changing at prescribed places in the composition.

Several other names, such as dohol, davul, tavel, and so on have been applied to the sorna. Since dohol is a double-faced drum sometimes it is called do-rūyeh in Persian language, in contrast to ghaval and daf, which are yek-rūyeh (one-faced).

== Popularity ==
The Sorna is mostly played in Lorestan, Chaharmahal and Bakhtiari, Kurdistan, Sistan and Baluchestan province and Iranian Azerbaijan.

In Lorestan, Sorna is used as a main instrument during wedding ceremonies and also funeral ceremonies (which is called Chamaryounah). Sorna almost always is accompanied with dohol in this region.

In Balochistan It mostly performed by forming a circle by a group of people, dancing and clapping. Do-Chapi almost always includes Sorna and Dohol. In the region of Sistan and Baluchestan, sorna is mostly used in wedding ceremonies and other celebration. The instrument is always accompanied by dohol and sometimes may include traditional dance by forming a circle.

== See also ==
- Baluchi music
- Karnay
- Shahmirza Moradi
- Zurna
- Chaap
