= Sopila =

Musical instrument

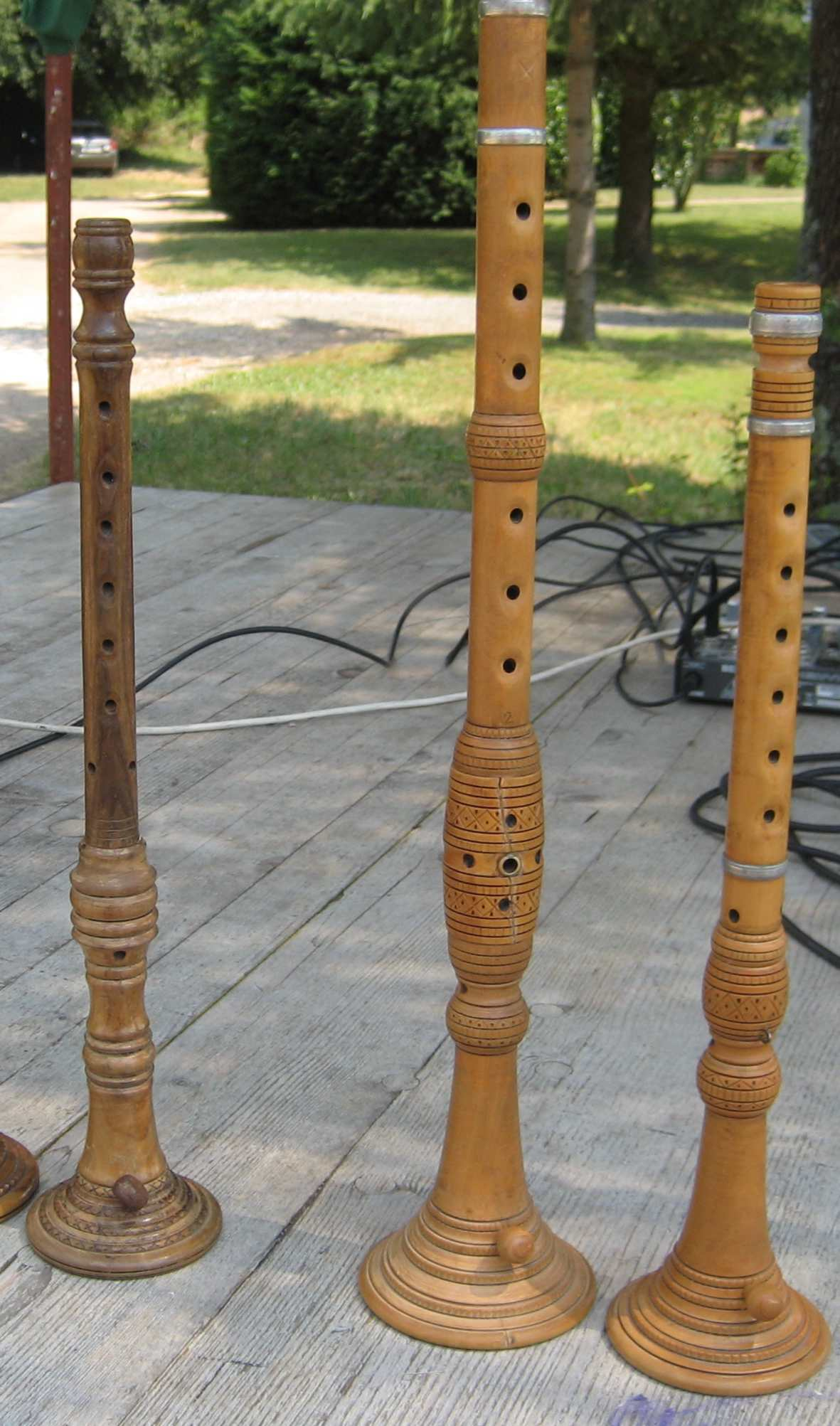
- Other names: Sopile, Roženice
- Classification: Double reed

Playing range
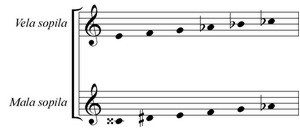
- Sopilas: small/thin/high and great/fat/low

Related instruments
- Sorna; Rhaita; Suona; Zurna; Shawm

The sopile (or roženice, as it is called in Istria) is an ancient traditional woodwind instrument of Croatia, similar to the oboe or shawm. It is used in the regions of Kvarner, Kastav, Vinodol, Island Krk, and Istria. Sopile are always played in pairs so there are great and small or thin and fat sopila. Sopile are musical instruments offering very interesting possibilities with a unique piercing sound. This is replicated in more modern examples of Kvarner music through use of modified double reed clarinet or soprano Dulzaina. Sopile are, by "mih" and "šurle," and today are very popular in the folk traditions of Istria, Kvarner and Island Krk.

Roženice are ancient traditional musical instruments which continue to be used today in the region of Istria. Roženice are very similar to sopile from Island Krk. Roženice are always played in pairs so there are great and small or thin and fat rozenica. Roženice have a very piercing special sound, and have the possibility of producing a variety of sounds. Roženice are, by "mih" and "šurle", today very popular in folk tradition of Istra.

The sopila is a wooden horn originating from Istria and some of the northern islands along the Adriatic Coast of Croatia. Like oboes, sopilas have double reeds, but are always played in pairs; one larger than the other. Both have six finger holes, being equally spaced on the smaller one, and set in groups of three on the larger one. Often used to accompany dancing, the voice of the sopila is that of the Istrian scale.

== See also ==
- Rhaita
- Shawm
- Suona
- Zurna

== Sources ==
- Roženice (sopele, sopile, supiele, tororo) (in Croatian)
- Sopile (in Croatian)
- Sopile
