= Single-reed instrument =

Class of woodwind instruments

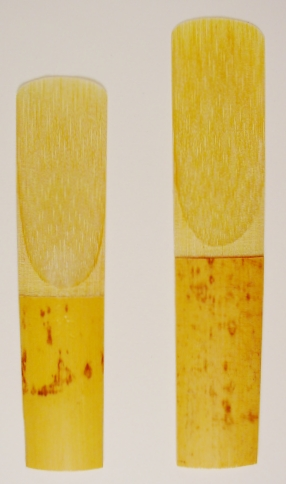
The reeds of alto (left) and tenor saxophones (right) . They are of comparable dimensions to alto and bass clarinet reeds, respectively.

A single-reed instrument is a woodwind instrument that uses only one reed to produce sound. The very earliest single-reed instruments were documented in ancient Egypt, ancient Greece as well as the Middle East, and the Roman Empire. The earliest types of single-reed instruments used idioglottal reeds, where the vibrating reed is a tongue cut and shaped on the tube of cane. Much later, single-reed instruments started using heteroglottal reeds, where a reed is cut and separated from the tube of cane and attached to a mouthpiece of some sort. By contrast, in a double reed instrument (such as the oboe and bassoon), there is no mouthpiece; the two parts of the reed vibrate against one another. Reeds are traditionally made of cane and produce sound when air is blown across or through them. The type of instruments that use a single reed are clarinets and saxophone. The timbre of a single and double reed instrument is related to the harmonic series caused by the shape of the corpus. E.g. the clarinet is only including the odd harmonics due to air column modes canceling out the even harmonics. This may be compared to the timbre of a square wave.

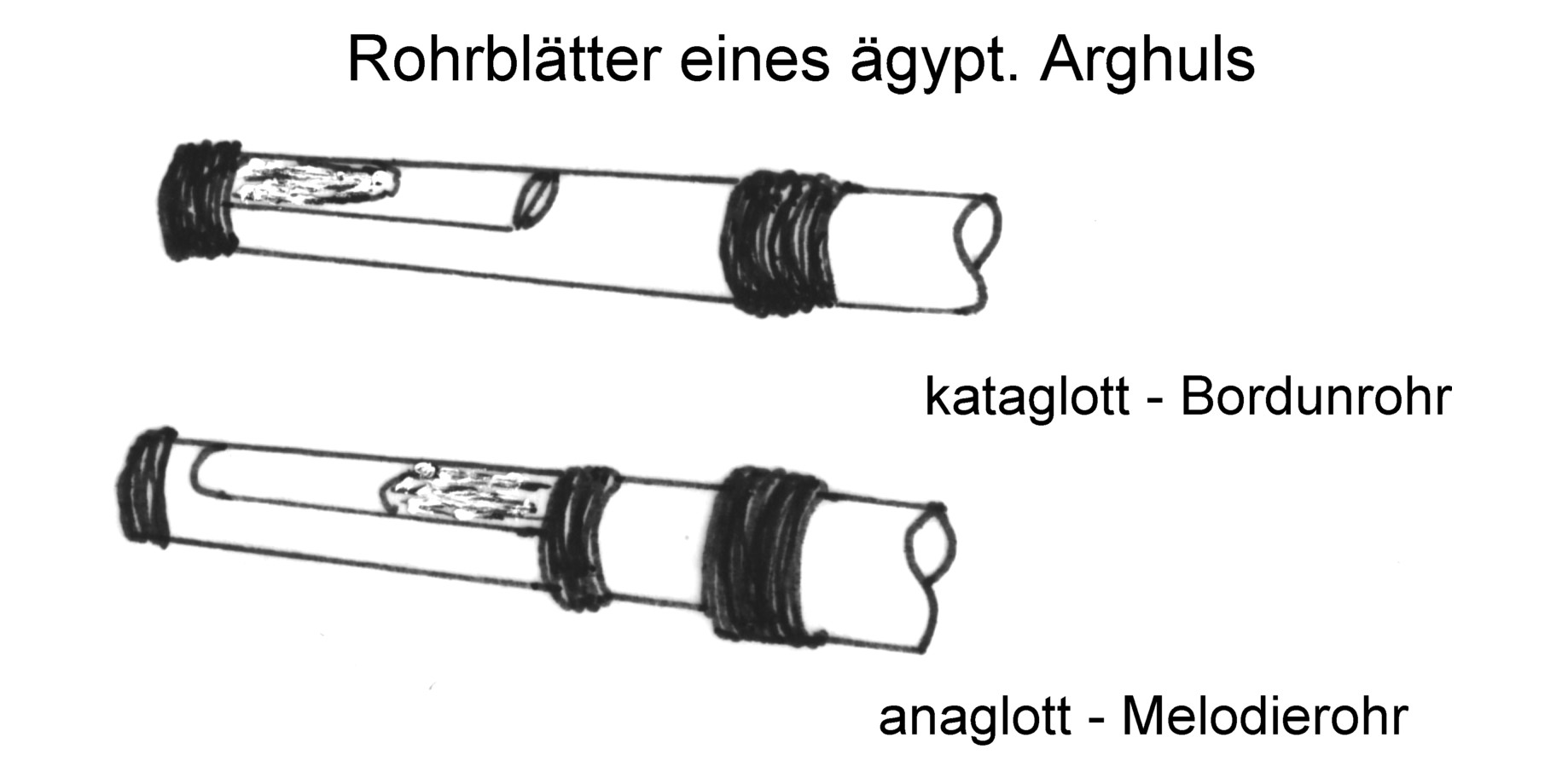
Drawings of idioglot reeds: tubular single reeds in which the reed is still part of the reed stem. Reeds can be split from middle upward (kataglott, the reed hangs down) and from top downward (anaglott, the reed stands up). These particular reeds are drawn from those used in an arghul. Also used in bagpipes, and reedpipes or clarinet family: bülban, diplica, dili tuiduk, dozaleh, early chalumeaus, cifte, launeddas, mijwiz, pilili, reclam de xeremies, sipsi, and zummara.

Most single-reed instruments are descended from single-reed idioglot instruments called 'memet', found in Egypt as early as 2700 BCE. Due to their fragility, no instruments from antiquity were preserved but iconographic evidence is prevalent. During the Old Kingdom in Egypt (2778–2723 BCE), memets were depicted on the reliefs of seven tombs at Saqqarra, six tombs at Giza, and the pyramids of Queen Khentkaus. Most memets were double-clarinets, where two reed tubes were tied or glued together to form one instrument. Multiple pipes were used to reinforce sound or generate a strong beat-tone with slight variations in tuning among the pipes. One of the tubes usually functioned as a drone, but the design of these simple instruments varied endlessly. The entire reed entered the mouth, meaning that the player could not easily articulate so melodies were defined by quick movement of the fingers on the tone holes. These types of double-clarinets are still prevalent today, but also developed into simplified single-clarinets and hornpipes. Modern-day idioglots found in Egypt include the arghul and the zummara.

== Classification ==
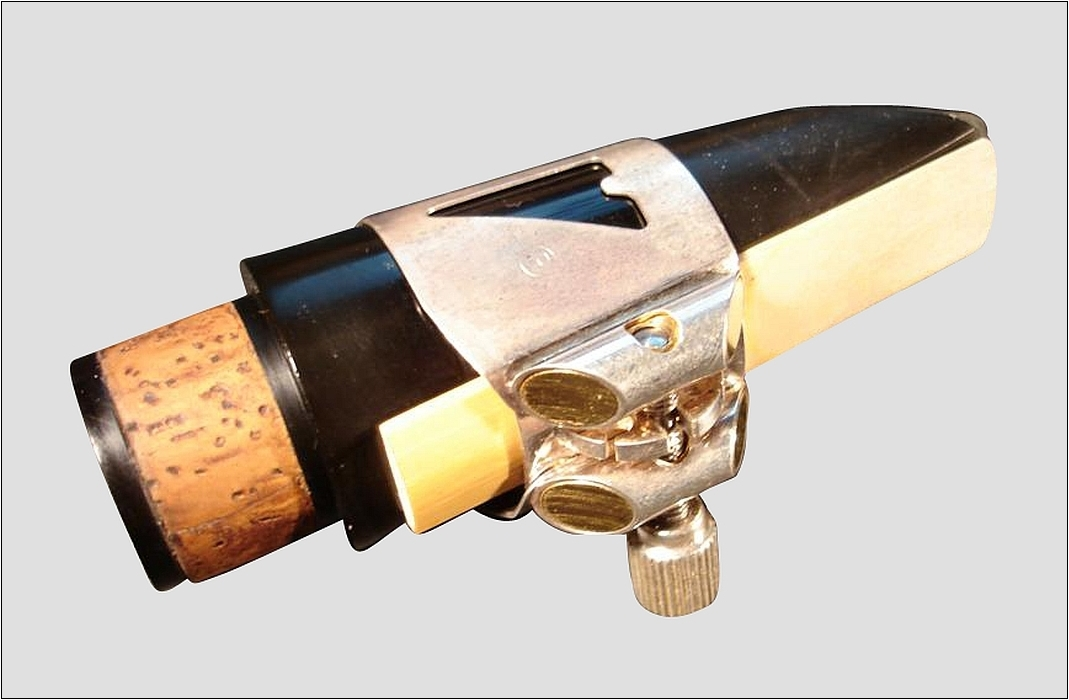
The ligature, mouthpiece, and reed of a clarinet. These three components are present in many modern European Classical single-reed instruments and tend to be aesthetically and mechanically similar.

Single reed instruments fall under three Hornbostel–Sachs classes:

- 412.13 Free reeds.
- 422.2 Single reed instruments: The pipe has a single 'reed' consisting of a percussion lamella. These are the percussion reeds including clarinets and saxophones.
- 422.3 Reedpipes with free reeds: The reed vibrates through [at] a closely fitted frame, and there are fingerholes.

== Comparing clarinets and saxophones ==
The following is a list of clarinets and saxophones, relative to their range and key of transposition from the opposite family:

Range	Clarinet	Saxophone
B♭ Soprano	Soprano	Soprano
E♭ Alto	Alto	Alto
B♭ Tenor	Bass	Tenor
E♭ Baritone	Contra-alto	Baritone
B♭ Bass	Contrabass	Bass

Note that if one was to compare clarinets to their saxophone counterparts while considering their approximate lowest (concert) pitch†, the order would shift:

Lowest Pitch	Clarinet	Saxophone
~E♭_{3}	E♭ Sopranino	B♭ Soprano
~D♭_{3}	B♭ Soprano	E♭ Alto
~A♭_{2}	E♭ Alto	B♭ Tenor
~B♭_{1}	B♭ Bass	E♭ Baritone
~A♭_{1}	E♭ Contra-alto	B♭ Bass
~B♭_{0}	B♭ Contrabass	E♭ Contrabass

†The lowest possible pitch of each clarinet and saxophone is dependent on its manufacturer and model (the pitches used are typical of professional instruments).

== List of single-reed instruments ==
=== Modern ===
- Aulochrome
- Clarinet
- Heckel-clarina
- Heckelphone-clarinet
- Octavin
- Saxophone
- Tárogató
- Xaphoon

=== Historical ===
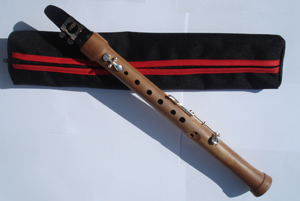
Chalumeau

- Mock Trumpet
- Chalumeau

=== Traditional ===
Traditional

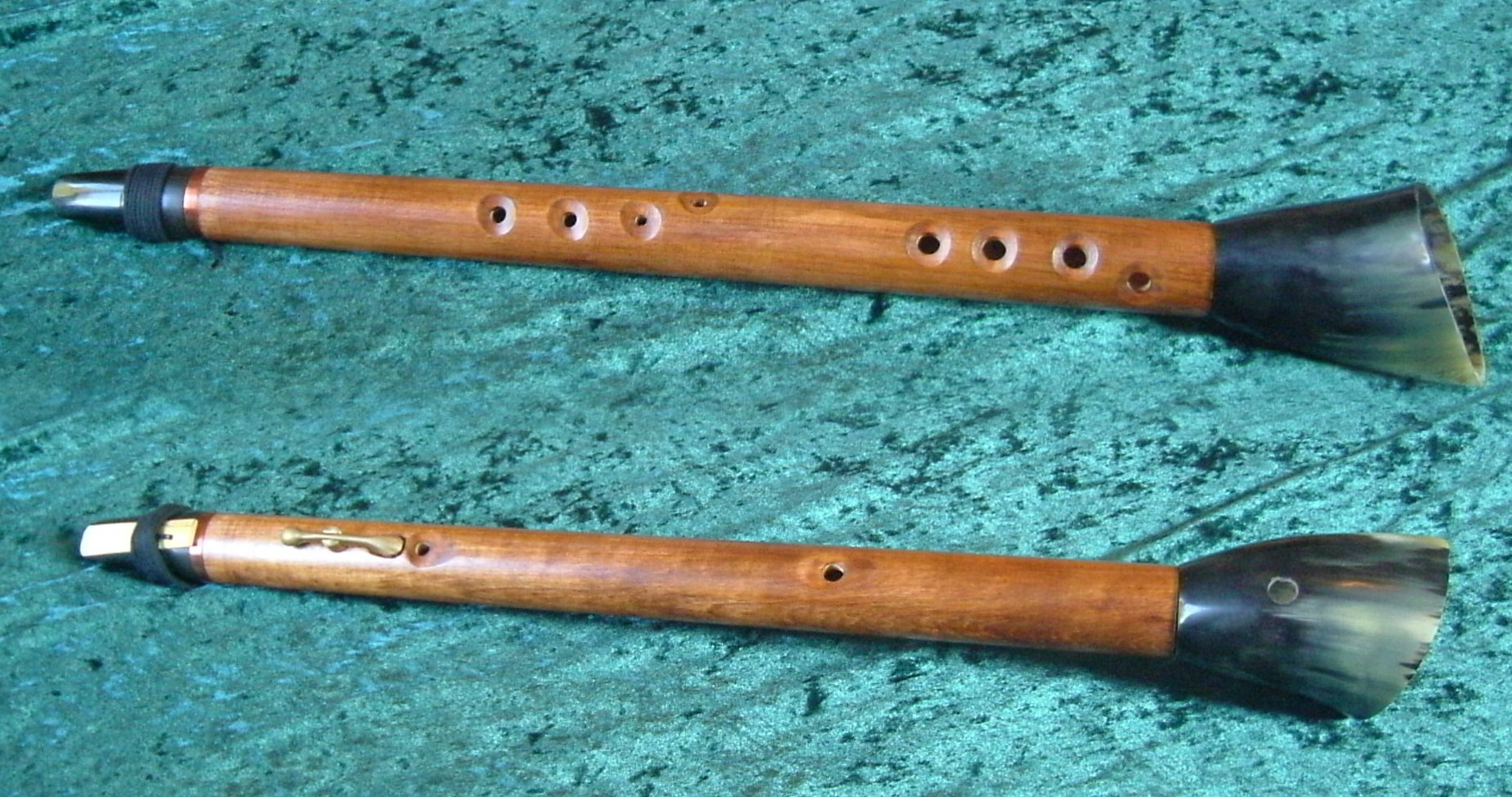
Treble/soprano birbynė

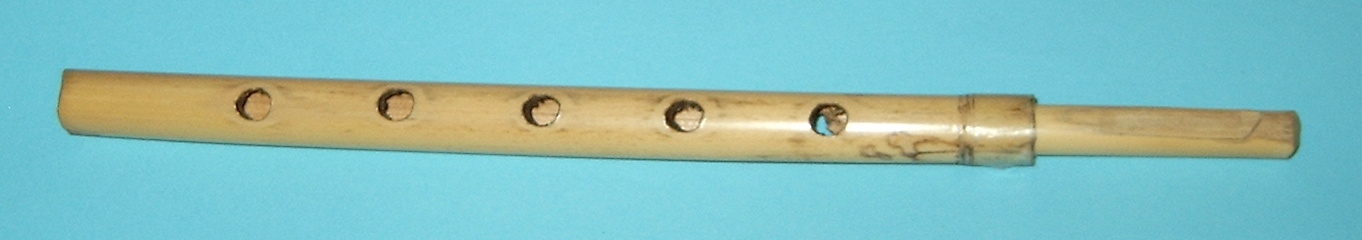
Bamboo sipsi

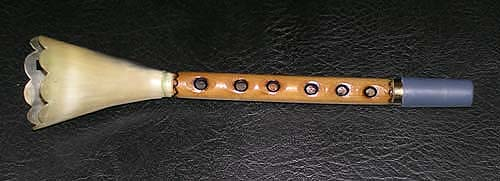
Zhaleika

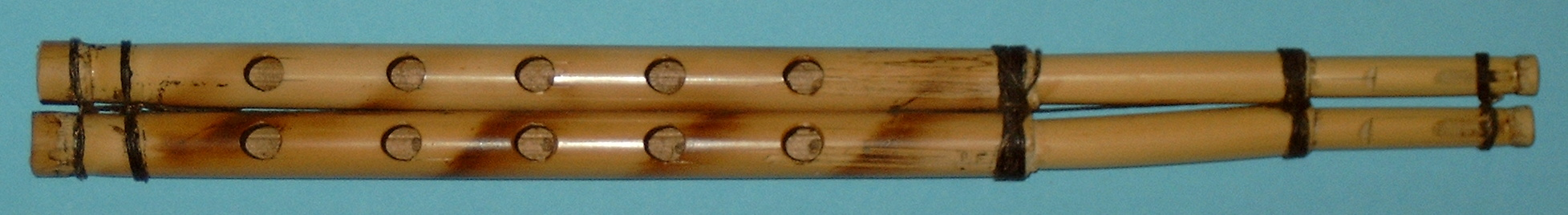
Egyptian mijwiz

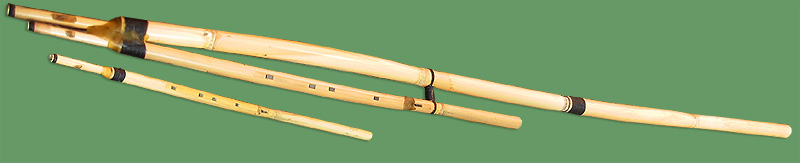
Sardinian Launeddas

European

- Alboka
- Birbynė
- Chalumeau
- Diplica
- Ganurags
- Hornpipe
- Launeddas
- Pilili
- Mock trumpet
- Pibgorn
- Pku
- Sipsi
- Stock-and-horn
- Zhaleika

Middle Eastern

- Arghul
- Double clarinet
- Mijwiz
- Sipsi

Central Asian

- Bülban

South Asian

- Tarpa

Southeast Asian

- Pey pok
- Sarune Etek
- Sneng
- Toleat

== Playing a single reed instrument ==
Although the clarinet and saxophone both have a single reed attached to their mouthpiece, the playing technique or embouchure is distinct from each other.

The standard embouchures for single reed woodwinds like the clarinet and saxophone are variants of the single lip embouchure, formed by resting the reed upon the bottom lip, which rests on the teeth and is supported by the chin muscles and the buccinator muscles on the sides of the mouth. The top teeth rest on top of the mouthpiece. The manner in which the lower lip rests against the teeth differs between clarinet and saxophone embouchures. In clarinet playing, the lower lip is rolled over the teeth and corners of the mouth are drawn back, which has the effect of drawing the upper lip around the mouthpiece to create a seal due to the angle at which the mouthpiece rests in the mouth. With the saxophone embouchure, the lower lip rests against, but not over, the teeth as in pronouncing the letter "V" and the corners of the lip are drawn in (similar to a drawstring bag). With the less common double-lip embouchure, the top lip is placed under (around) the top teeth. In both instances, the position of the tongue in the mouth plays a vital role in focusing and accelerating the air stream blown by the player. This results in a more mature and full sound, rich in overtones.
