= Welsh bagpipes =

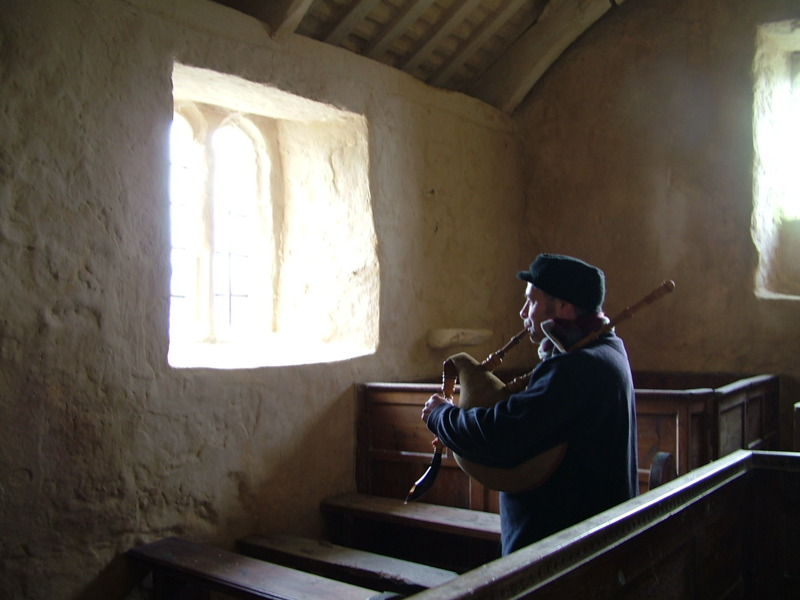
Welsh Bagpipe (single-reed type) made by John Glennydd

Welsh bagpipes (Welsh: pipa cŵd (Note: Also known in Welsh as pibau cŵd, côd-biban, côd-bibau, pibgod, cotbib, pibau cyrn, chwibanogl a chod, sachbib, backpipes, bacbib); with the names in Welsh referring specifically to a bagpipe) are a related instrument to one type of bagpipe, a chanter, which when played without the bag and drone is called a pibgorn (Welsh for 'hornpipe'). The generic term pibau ('pipes') which covers all woodwind instruments is also used in Welsh. They have been played, documented, represented and described in Wales since the fourteenth century. A piper in Welsh is called a pibydd or a pibgodwr.

== History ==
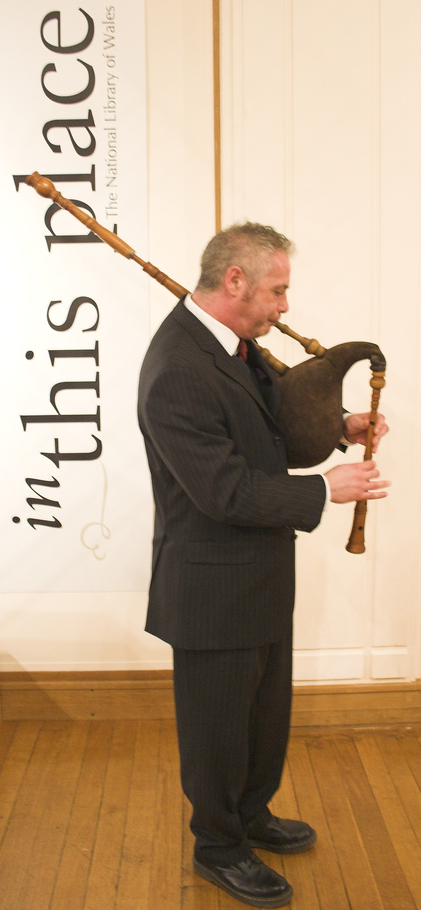
Welsh Bagpipe (double-reed type) pitched in G Major made by Jonathan Shorland.

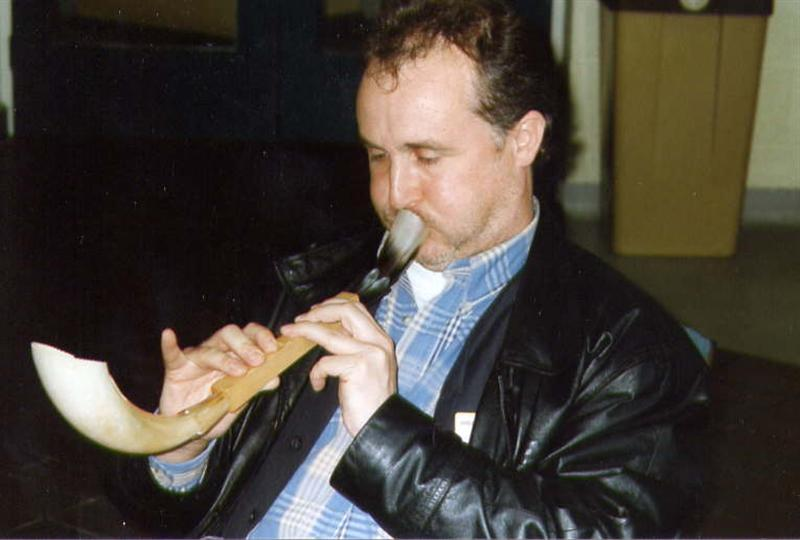
Huw Roberts playing a pibgorn, Welsh hornpipe made by Jonathan Shorland

In 1376, the poet Iolo Goch describes the instrument in his Cywydd to Syr Hywel y Fwyall. Also, in the same century, Brut y Tywysogion ("Chronicle of the Princes"), written around 1330 AD, states that there are three types of wind instrument: Organ a Phibeu a Cherd y got ("organ, and pipes, and bag music"). Continuous use of the instrument has since waxed and waned in popularity according to musical fashions. Pipe making has historically been localised and idiosyncratic, and piping since the sixteenth century has generally been employed in celebratory or public roles such as weddings, markets, or dances.

"Mabsantau, neithioirau, gwylnosau, &c, were their red-letter days, and the rude merrimaking of the village green the pivot of all that was worth living for in a mundane existence. I do not remember much about the Gwylmabsant and the Gwylnos - I came a quarter of a century too late for those wonderful orgies - but I remember the neithior with its all-day and all-night rollicking fun. We did not have the crwth, but we had the fiddle, and occasionally the harp, or a home-made degenerate sort of pibgorn. I myself am a tolerable player on the simplified bibgorn."

A hiatus of fifty years occurred between the playing of Meredith Morris and the renaissance of native instruments in the 1970s, during which piping in Wales was carried mainly on the Great Highland pipe.

== Types ==
The Welsh Academy in 2008 noted that "[i]t is unlikely that there was ever a single standardized form of bagpipe in Wales". Today there are two types of bagpipe made and played in Wales. One species uses a single-reed (cal or calaf) in the chanter (Welsh: llefarydd, see image top right), and the other uses a double-reed (see image on right). The single-reed chanter is also furnished with a cow-horn bell. Both types of chanter may also be played un-attached to the bag; the single-reed type in the form of a hornpipe (Welsh: pibgorn), and the double-reed type in the form of a shawm. The double-reed type is characteristically louder, and can over-blow a few notes in the upper register. The single-reed type plays only an octave. The bagpipes may be drone-less or furnished with drones (byrdwn) via the bag (cwdyn).

The single-reed chanter is drilled with six small finger-holes and a thumb-hole giving a diatonic compass of an octave. Modern examples are generally pitched in D Major or D Mixolydian, and F Major; but historical instruments give a variety of pitch as well as musical modes. The double reed chanters come in a variety of pitches, and some of the instruments may be cross-fingered to give different modes. Some have a semi-tone leading note at the bottom of the instrument, others give a whole tone leading note.

Repertoire on both is contiguous with minor adaptations necessitated by the limitations of each particular instrument.

== Modern pipes ==
Contemporary pipe makers in Wales base their chanters on measurements of extant historical examples of the pibgorn. Some of these instruments, dating from the eighteenth century, are on display at the Museum of Welsh Life. The single-reed type pipe with a drone attached via the bag is called the pibau cyrn. A notable player of these pipes is Ceri Rhys Matthews. Makers include John Glennydd from Carmarthenshire and John Tose from Pembrokeshire.

Other makers such as Jonathan Shorland from Cardiganshire have based the chanters of their idiosyncratic double-reeded pipes on measurements of the chanters of the Breton veuze, the Great Highland Bagpipe chanter, the Galician gaita chanter, the Breton bombarde, as well as historical descriptions, drawings and carvings of bagpipes in Wales. These may be furnished with one, two, or three drones. Typically, they are pitched in D Major, D Mixolydian, G Major and G Mixolydian. No standardisation is employed in the making of contemporary bagpipes in Wales. Shorland is also a significant maker of pibgorn.

== Players ==
Welsh pipe groups and bands include Pibau Pencader, Pibe Bach and Pibau Preseli. Welsh folk groups using bagpipes include Fernhill and Carreg Lafar. Ceri Rhys Matthews and Jonathan Shorland have recorded pipe music using different types of Welsh bagpipes called pibau on Fflach records, and Matthews has recorded an album devoted to the pibau cyrn called Pibddawns on the same label.

== Other types of bagpipe played in Wales ==
There are three Great Highland Bagpipe bands in Wales: The City of Newport Pipe Band, The City of Swansea Pipe Band and the Cardiff Pipe Band. A recent development has been the use of imported Breton veuze, Irish uilleann pipes, Galician gaita, French cornemuse and modern English bagpipes on which Welsh repertoire is played.
