= Fflach =

Fflach is a Welsh record label and recording studio. It was founded in 1980 in Cardigan, Ceredigion, Wales by brothers Richard and Wyn Jones, Gareth Lewis and Robin Davies, members of Welsh new wave music group Ail Symudiad. Their first release was in early 1981, with their single/EP, Twristiad yn y Dre. The label gave an opportunity to record more new wave music in Wales for bands such as Y Ficar, Eryr Wen, Malcolm Neon, Angylion Stanley, Y Diawled, Rocyn and Maffia Mr. Huws.

Fflach has two subsidiary labels: Rasp, formed in 2000, which records and releases music by new rock and pop bands; and fflach:tradd, formed in 1997, which records and releases traditional music, specialising in indigenous musical instruments such as triple harp, crwth, pibgorn and Welsh bagpipes, thus gaining the label an internationally respected reputation.

== Subsidiary labels ==
- Fflach – Main label
- Rasp – Rock and pop label
- fflach:tradd – Traditional Welsh music, world music and jazz

== Selected artists ==
On Fflach

- Ail Symudiad
- Dom
- Malcolm Neon

On Rasp

- Mattoidz
- Lowri Evans
- Garej Dolwen
- Y Ffug
- Bromas
- Castro

On fflach:tradd

- Llio Rhydderch
- Julie Murphy and Dylan Fowler
- Ceri Rhys Matthews
- Cass Meurig
- Sild
- Gwilym Bowen Rhys
- DnA (Delyth and Angharad Jenkins)

== See also ==
- List of record labels
