= Iñaki Plaza Murga =

Inaki Plaza Murga
- Born: 1976 (age 49–50); Bilbao, Biscay
- Origin: Basque Country, Spain
- Genres: Basque music
- Instruments: trikitixa, txalaparta, pandero, cajon, bodhran, d'rbuka, hindu slat
- Years active: 1988–present
- Member of: Hogeihatz Proiektua
- Website: Hogeihatz Proiektua

Iñaki Plaza Murga (born 1976) is a Basque musician from Bilbao, Biscay. He began studying trikitixa (Basque diatonic accordion) and traditional Basque percussion (txalaparta, pandero) in 1993. He later began studying ethnic percussion (cajón, bodhrán, d´rbuka) as well as the hindú slat with Sergey Sapricheff. He played with Kepa Junkera until 2008, and currently plays with Ibon Koteron and “Etxak” (a Euskadi txalaparta band) as a txalapartari, percussionist and trikitilari. He partners with Ion Garmendia Anfurrutia on their current project, entitled “Hogeihatz Proiektua” ("Twenty Fingers Project"). The first discographic work of this project is projected to be introduced next winter.

== Collaborations ==
- Berrogüetto (“Viaxe Por Urticaria” 1999, “Renovart” soundtrack 1998)
- Bilboko konpartsak (“Aste Nagusia 25 Urte” 2002)
- Araba euskaraz 2003 (“Orobil Borobil” 2003)
- Chus Pedro (2003)
- Ibon Koteron (“Airea” 2004)
- Kukuma (“Kukuma” 2004)
- Kepa Junkera (“K” Latin Grammy 2004, “Athletic Bihotzez” 2004, “Hiri” 2006)
- Sobrino Sobrado (“Van Pasando Los Años”2006)
- Faltriqueira (“Effecto Faltriqueira” 2006)
- Tejedor (“Musica Na Maleta” 2006, BSO “La torre de Suso” 2007)
