= Ion Garmendia Anfurrutia =

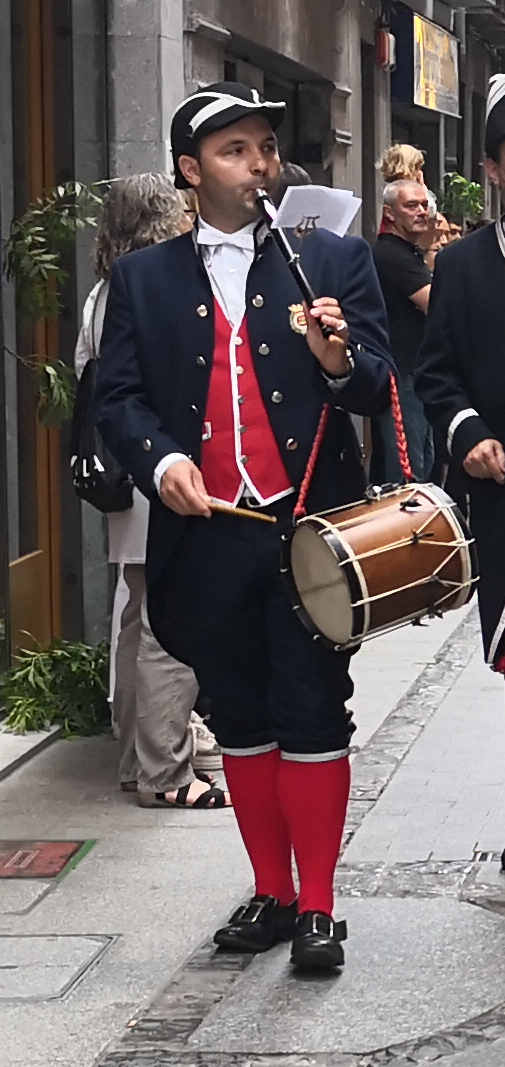
- Ion Garmendia Anfurrutia

Background information
- Born: 1979 (age 46–47); Ibarra, Spain
- Origin: Basque Country, Spain
- Genres: Basque music
- Instruments: vocals, txistu, txalaparta, alboka, gaita navarra, pandero, percussion
- Years active: 1988–present
- Website: Hogeihatz Proiektua

Ion Garmendia Anfurrutia (born 1979) is a Basque musician from Ibarra, Gipuzkoa. He began taking voice lessons and studying txistu in 1988 in Ibarra. In 1997, he entered into a teacher training program in Gasteiz, and in 1999 began learning the alboka. In 2002 entered in Musikene (Centro Superior de Música del País Vasco) to study "nuevas tendencias en la música tradicional" (new trends in traditional music) under Kepa Junkera. He later partnered with fellow musician Ibon Koteron, and his proficiency in the alboka and gaita navarra were intensified. He also studied the txalaparta and the pandero with Iñaki Plaza Murga. From 2004 to 2008, he was part of Kepa Junkera’s group as a txalapartari, txistulari, albokari, and percussionist. As a txistulari, he has played in the municipal bands of Donostia and Tolosa, and is currently a part of the municipal band of txistularis of Tolosa. He continues to be a member of Ibon Koteron's band, and is currently involved in the "Twenty Fingers Project" (Hogeihatz Proiektua) with Inaki Plaza Murga. The first discographic work of this project is projected to be introduced next winter.

== Collaborations ==
- Araba Euskaraz 2003 ("Orobil borobil" 2003)
- Kepa Junkera ("Athletic Bihotzez" 2004, "Hiri" 2006)
- Ibon Koteron ("Airea" 2004)
- Oreka Tx ("Nömadak Tx" 2006)
- Faltriqueira ("Effecto Faltriqueira" 2006)
- Tejedor ("Musica Na Maleta" 2006, BSO "La Torre de Suso" 2007)
- Trikizio (2007)
