= Julie Murphy =

Julie Murphy may refer to:

- Julie Murphy (author), American author
- Julie Murphy (singer) (born 1961), Welsh singer
