= Gaita gastoreña =

Hornpipe native to El Gastor, a region of Andalucia, Spain

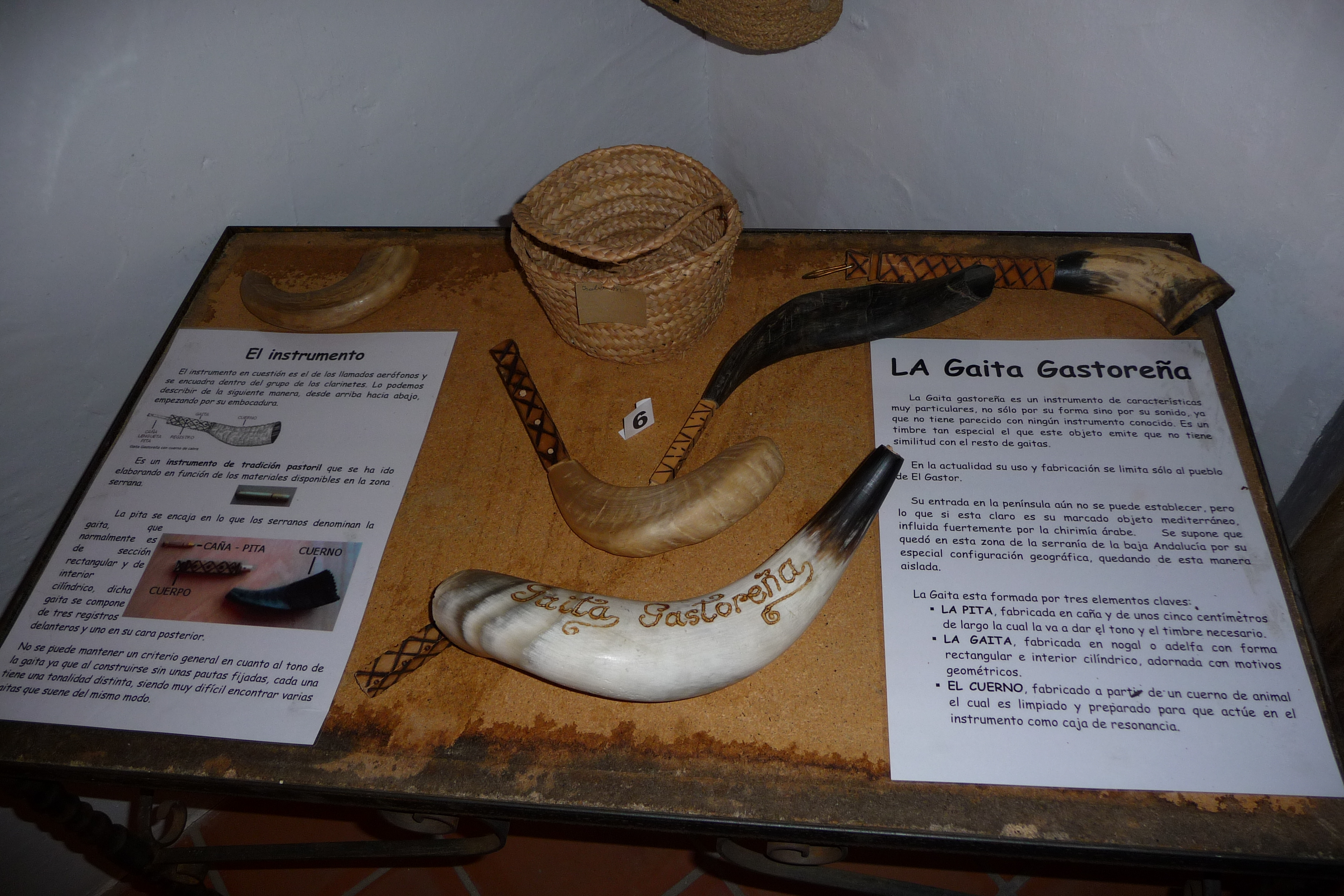
Gaita gastoreña at the Museo de Usos y Costumbres Populares in El Gastor.

The gaita gastoreña is a type of hornpipe native to El Gastor, a region of Andalucia, Spain. It consists of a simple reed, a wooden tube in its upper part, and a resonating bell of horn in its lower part. Such instruments are only found outside El Gastor in Madrid and in the Basque Country (see: alboka).

== Background ==
Traditionally, the gaita gastoreña was played from November on. The youth played the hornpipe around the fire for entertainment during the long nights at the close of the year. After the end of the Christmas festivities, the hornpipe would not be played until the following year.

Currently, the hornpipe is played for the festivals of Corpus Christi and Christmas in El Gastor.

The instrument was a pastoral instrument, probably played by shepherds.
