= Ceri Rhys Matthews =

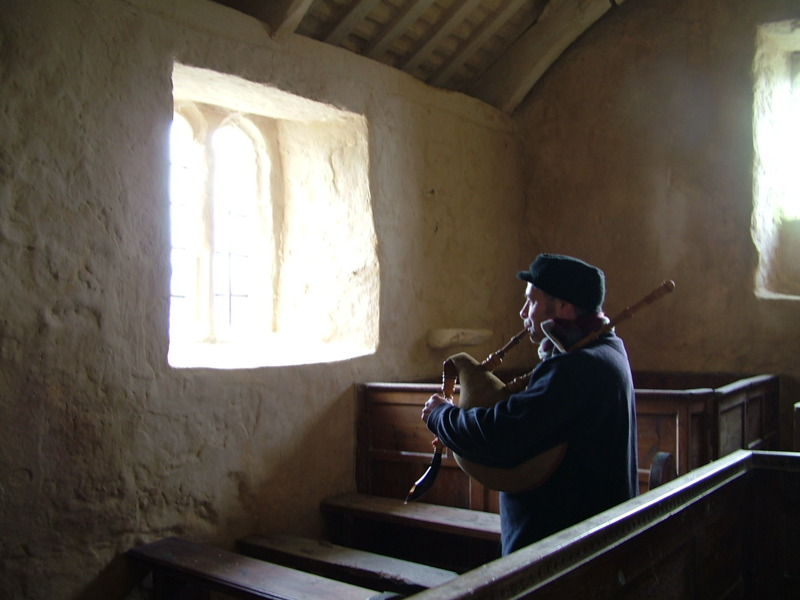

Background information
- Born: 29 May 1960 (age 64)
- Origin: Swansea, Wales
- Genres: Folk
- Occupation(s): Musician, Record Producer, Teacher
- Instrument(s): Flute, pibgorn, Welsh bagpipes, Guitar
- Years active: 1985–present

Ceri Rhys Matthews (born 29 May 1960) is a Welsh traditional musician, record producer, and teacher.

== Biography ==
Matthews was born in the suburb and historical village of Treboeth, in Swansea, Wales. Educated in Welsh-Medium schools in Ynystawe, Lonlas and Ystalyfera, he went on to study Fine Art and Painting at Swansea Art School and Maidstone College of Art under Patricia Briggs, Robin Sewell, Noel White and Michael Upton.

== Music and production ==
As a soloist and member of the Welsh folk group Fernhill, he has been called "a key figure in the renaissance of Welsh musical traditions", by journalist Julian May in Songlines (magazine) and described by him as "a one man Welsh music industry" He has produced 21 CDs for Welsh label Fflach's subsidiary fflach:tradd. In 2000, he produced the Rough Guide to the Music of Wales for World Music Network. In 2009, he produced Blodeugerdd: Song of the Flowers - An Anthology of Welsh Music and Song for Smithsonian Folkways which came first in the 2009 Independent Music Awards for Best World Traditional Album.

== Teaching ==
His teaching activities cover a wide spectrum. These include a long term Junior School Flute-making project in Dolgellau, Wales; teaching at various Summer Schools including The English Acoustic Collective Summer School, Ruskin Mill; and at the Yscolan Weekends, Pentre Ifan.

He is a visiting tutor at the BMus Degree in folk and traditional music at Newcastle University, and The Sage Gateshead; and at the BMus (Hons) Music Degree at the Royal Welsh College of Music and Drama in Cardiff.

== Discography ==
With Saith Rhyfeddod

- Saith Rhyfeddod (Sain, 1991)
- Cico Nyth Cacwn (Fflach, 1994)

As solo musician

- Traditional songs of Wales ( Saydisc, 1995)
- A Celtic Christmas (Saydisc, 1996)
- Shrug off ya complex (with Y Tystion. Crai, 1998)
- South Wales Beat (with Wepun Ex Project. Wonky Wax, 2003)
- Funky Fresh (with Wepun Ex Project. Wonky Wax, 2003)
- William Kennedy Piping Festival (Armagh Piper's Club, 2004)
- Alawon (with Burum. fflach:tradd, 2006)
- Yscolan (Disgyfrith, 2006)
- Y Gwythienne (Disgyfrith, 2021)

With fernhill

- Ca' nôs (Be Jo, 1996)
- Llatai (Be Jo, 1997)
- Whilia (Be Jo, 2000)
- hynt (Be Jo, 2003)
- Na Prádle (live) (Be Jo, 2007)
- Canu Rhydd (Disgyfrith, 2011)
- Amser (self-released, 2014)

As Record producer

- Ffidil (fflach:ttradd, 1997)
- Datgan (fflach:ttradd, 1997)
- Telyn (fflach:ttradd, 1997)
- KilBride (fflach:ttradd, 1997)
- Gramundus (fflach:ttradd, 1998)
- Pibau (fflach:ttradd, 1999)
- Megin (fflach:ttradd, 1999)
- Minka (fflach:ttradd, 1999)
- Melangell (fflach:ttradd, 2000)
- The Rough Guide to the Music of Wales (World Music Network, 2000)
- Boys from the Hill (fflach:ttradd, 2001)
- Perllan (fflach:ttradd, 2001)
- Ffawd (fflach:ttradd, 2001)
- Enlli (fflach:ttradd, 2002)
- Sidan (fflach:ttradd, 2002)
- Toreth (fflach:ttradd, 2003)
- Crwth (fflach:ttradd, 2004)
- Priodi (fflach:ttradd, 2004)
- Blas (fflach:ttradd, 2004)
- Gwenllian (fflach:ttradd, 2005)
- Pibddawns (fflach:ttradd, 2006)
- Tro (fflach:ttradd, 2008)
- Blodeugerdd: Song of the Flowers (Smithsonian Folkways, 2010)
