= Canu Rhydd =

Studio album by Fernhill
- Released: 1 May 2011
- Recorded: 2010
- Genre: Folk
- Label: disgyfrith
- Producer: Fernhill

Fernhill chronology
| Na Prádle (2007) | Canu Rhydd (2011) | Amser (2014) |

Recorded at Dartington College of Arts in July 2010, Canu Rhydd is the fifth studio album by Welsh folk group Fernhill. It was released on 1 May 2011 on disgyfrith Records. Described by Huw Stephens on BBC Radio 1 as "another wonderful Fernhill album", and by Verity Sharp on BBC Radio 3's Late Junction as "a very beautiful album", Canu Rhydd is the first of the groups' albums to feature Christine Cooper on fiddle and spoken word. She joins the existing line-up of Julie Murphy, Ceri Rhys Matthews, and Tomos Williams, all of whom appeared on the band's previous, live album, Na Prádle.

Canu Rhydd, Welsh for "free poetry", is described in the sleeve notes as “that written by the free will of the poet, unconstrained by patronage or by the bardic tradition”.

The album, like all Fernhill albums features songs sung in both Welsh and English. It is the first Fernhill album to be released on the disgyfrith label. All their previous albums were released on Tim Healey's Beautiful Jo Records, based in Oxford, England.

== Critical reception ==
Professional ratings
Review scores
| Source | Rating |
|---|---|
| Songlines (magazine) | 4/5 stars |
| fRoots Colin Irwin | (positive) |

Different traditional songs are woven together in each track, changing the thrust of the original songs within their new context. They are, according to Julian May in a Songlines review of the album, "concerned not with the culture of past aristocratic patronage but the expression of the ordinary people of Wales. So they have lovingly assembled these songs from odd verses and fragments of manuscripts. They are about love, place, birds, forests and everyday life. They are touching and beautiful."

== Track listing ==
1. "adar"
2. "when i was in my prime"
3. "diddan"
4. "forest"
5. "glyn cynon"
6. "glyn tawe"
7. "y fwynlan o serch"

== Personnel ==
=== Musicians ===
- Julie Murphy - voice, sruti
- Ceri Rhys Matthews - guitar, flute, voice
- Tomos Williams - trumpet, flugelhorn
- Christine Cooper - fiddle, voice

=== Recording personnel ===
- Nick Marshall - engineer, mixing
- Jens Schroeder - mastering

=== Artwork ===
- Noel Hefele - photography, design, artwork

=== Label ===
- disgyfrith
