= Reclam de xeremies =

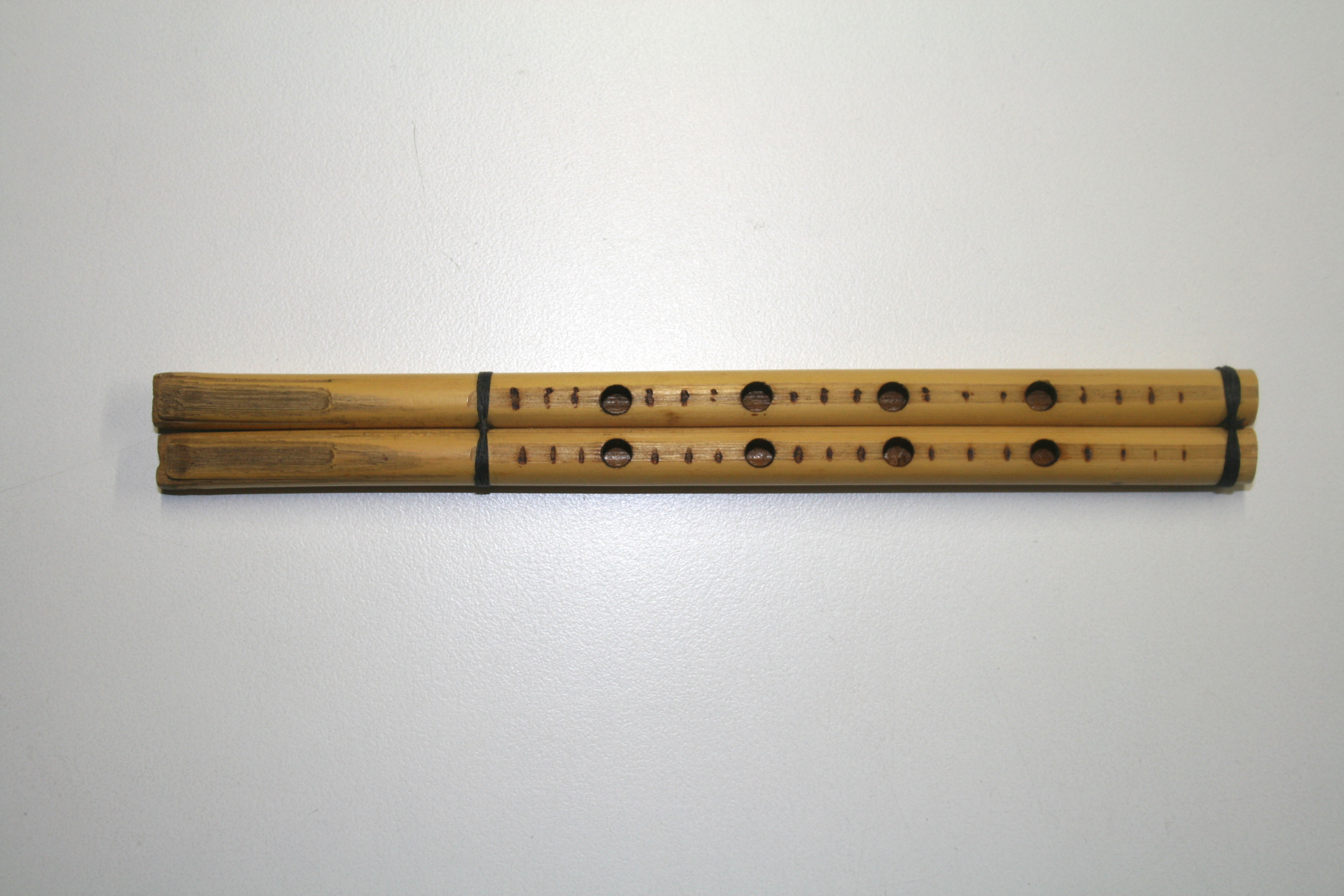
- Reclam de xeremies, modern manufacture

Woodwind instrument
- Classification: aerophone
- Hornbostel–Sachs classification: 422.221.2 (single-reed aerophones with a regular bore and fingerholes, sets of clarinets)

Related instruments
- arghul, clarinet, diplica, dili tuiduk, dozaleh, cifte, launeddas, mijwiz, pilili, sipsi, zammara, zummara

The reclam de xeremies, also known as the xeremia bessona or xeremieta, is a double clarinet with two single reeds, traditionally found on the Pityusic Island of Ibiza, off the Mediterranean coast of Spain.

It consists of two cane tubes of equal length, bound together by cord and small pieces of lead to stabilise the tubes. On each tube are several finger holes, traditionally four in the front and one on the back, though in modern instruments the back hole is often omitted. At the top end of each cane a smaller piece of cane holding the single reed, or directly cut into the instrument's top end, making it an idioglot single reed instrument.

Traditionally the fingerholes gave a pentatonic scale in a tuning varying by instrument.

Various researches believe that the reclam descends from a similar instrument of Hellenic Egypt. In any case, it does indeed appear to be very similar in design to other Mediterranean double clarinets such as the Arabic mijwiz, the Tunisian zumarra, the Egyptian argul or the Sardinian launeddas

Per the Hornbostel-Sachs classification, this is classified as a "cojoined single-reed instrument," categorised by the number 422.22.
