= Pibgorn (instrument) =

Welsh species of idioglot reed aerophone instruments

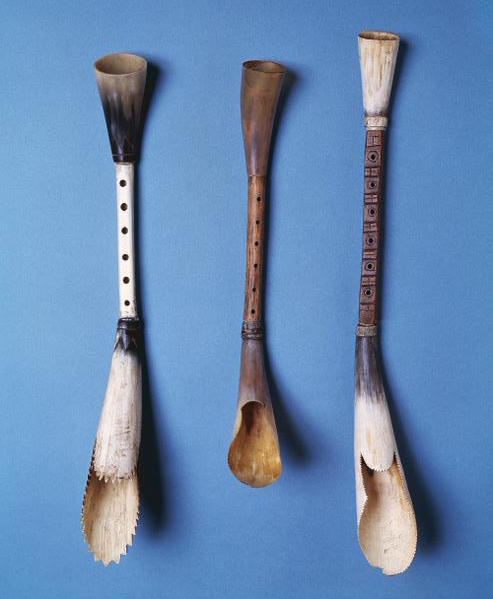
Three examples of Eighteenth Century Welsh Pibgorn

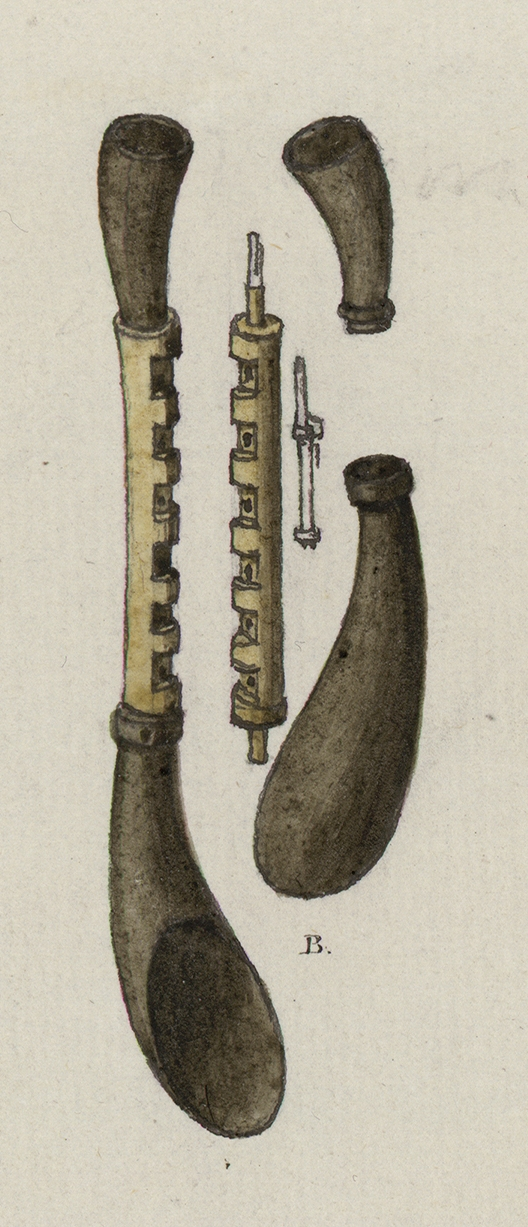
Illustration of a Pib-gorn from A Tour in Wales, 1778

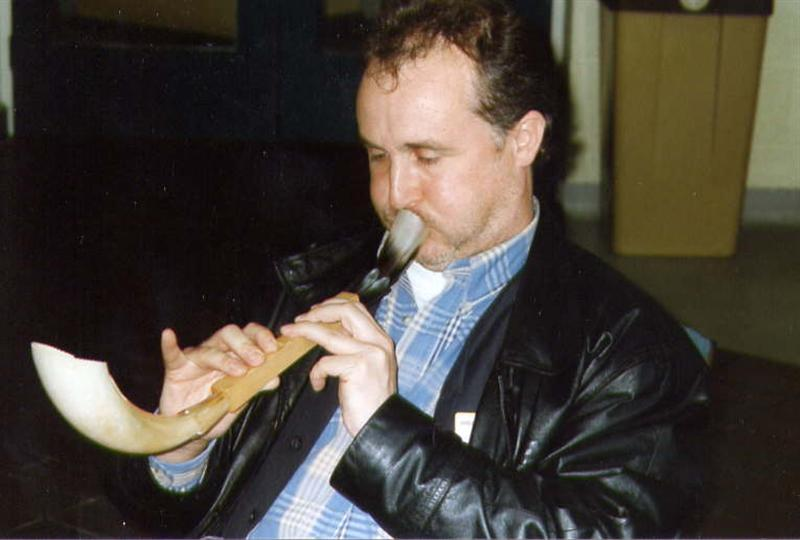
Huw Roberts playing a pibgorn, Welsh hornpipe made by Jonathan Shorland

The pibgorn is a Welsh species of idioglot reed aerophone. The name translates literally as "pipe-horn". It is also historically known as cornicyll and pib-corn. It utilises a single reed (Welsh: "cal", or "calaf"), cut from elder (Sambucus nigra) or reed (Arundo phragmites), like that found in the drone of a bagpipe, which is an early form of the modern clarinet reed. The single chambered body of the elder pipe has a naturally occurring parallel bore, into which are drilled six small finger-holes and a thumb-hole giving a diatonic compass of an octave. The body of the instrument is traditionally carved from a single piece of wood or bone (See photograph right). Playable, extant historical examples in the Museum of Welsh Life have bodies cut and shaped of elder. Another, unplayable instrument at the Museum, possibly of a later date, is made from the leg bone of an unspecified ungulate (See photograph right). Contemporary instruments are turned and bored from a variety of fruitwoods, or exotic hardwoods; or turned from, or moulded in plastics. The reed is protected by a reed-cap or stock of cow-horn. The bell is shaped from a section of cow-horn which serves to amplify the sound. The pibgorn may be attached to a bag, with the additional possibility of a drone, which is then called pibau cwd; or played directly with the mouth via the reed-cap.

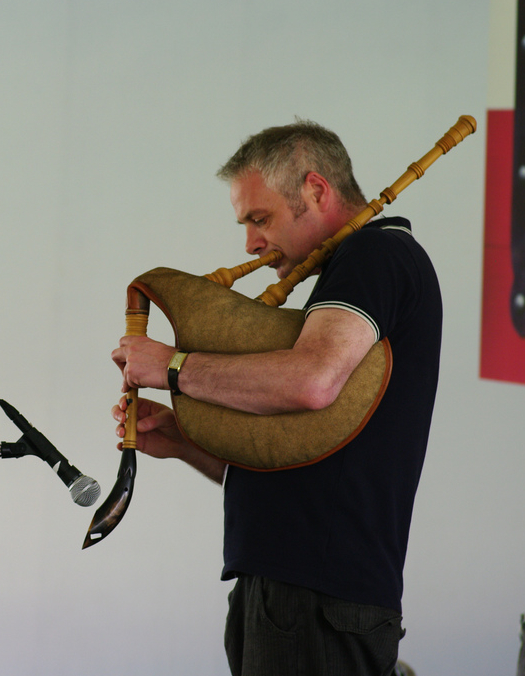
Ceri Rhys Matthews playing a Welsh Bag-Hornpipe or Pibe Cyrn

A double-pipe (having two parallel chanters both ending in cow-horn, with a common stock) of unknown provenance, dated 1701 held by the Museum of Welsh Life has caused some controversy as to its possible Welsh or Mediterranean origin.

== Early history ==
The pipes in Wales, of which the pibgorn is a class, are mentioned in the laws of Hywel Dda (died 949–50). The earliest transcription of these dates from 1250 and specify that "the King should recognise the status of a Pencerdd (the second in importance of the three court musicians, namely; Bardd Teulu, Pencerdd and Cerddor) in his service by giving him an appropriate instrument – either Harp, Crwth or Pipes." In modern Welsh orthography these three instruments are called telyn, crwth and pibau. Peniarth 20 (Brut y Tywysogion) c 1330, states that there are three types of wind instrument: "Organ, a Phibeu a Cherd y got", "organ, and pipes and bag music".

However, the instrument itself is older than these references, and is part of a pattern of distribution of similar idioglot reedpipes, hornpipes and bag-hornpipes throughout Asia, Europe and North Africa that includes the "Old British pibcorn or hornpipe" alboka, arghul, boha and others.

== Eighteenth- and nineteenth-century references ==
William Morris writes in a letter to his brother, the folklorist Richard Morris, in 1759: "(Translated) How pleasing it was to see the young farmworkers with their pibau cyrn (horn pipes) under their arms....gathering the cows and piping 'Mwynen Mai' and 'Meillionnen’."

According to Daines Barrington, who presented the pibgorn specimen shown at the Museum of Welsh Life to Fellows of the Society of Antiquaries of London, an Anglesey landowner called Mr Wynn of Penhesgedd, offered an annual prize for pibgorn playing towards the end of the eighteenth century. One such competition at Castellior Farm attracted 200 players. There is a further description by Siôn Wiliam Prichard (1749–1829) of Christmas celebrations on the Castellior farm where the pibgorn and other instruments were played. Barrington described the tone of the instrument as played to him: "by one of the lads [who had obtained the prize]... considering the materials of which the pibgorn is composed is really very tolerable"

David Griffith (Clwydfardd) (Died 1894) recalls his father telling him that "playing the Pibgorn was a common thing in those days in the South and that farmers' servant men were in the habit of carrying them with them when driving cattle to the fairs."

== Early twentieth century ==
The Reverend Meredith Morris (Died 1922) of The Gwaun Valley in Pembrokeshire writes in his autobiography in 1910: "Mabsantau, neithioirau, gwylnosau, &c, were their red-letter days, and the rude merrimaking of the village green the pivot of all that was worth living for in a mundane existence. I do not remember much about the Gwylmabsant and the Gwylnos – I came a quarter of a century too late for those wonderful orgies – but I remember the neithior with its all-day and all-night rollicking fun. We did not have the crwth, but we had the fiddle, and occasionally the harp, or a home-made degenerate sort of pibgorn. I myself am a tolerable player on the simplified bibgorn."

== Contemporary use ==
After a hiatus of fifty years, the pibgorn, alongside instruments such as the crwth, bagpipes, and the triple harp, has witnessed a resurgence in popularity as part of a general revival of interest in Welsh folk music.

Some modern instruments play a tempered scale to accommodate fixed pitch instruments such as guitar or keyboard, and are commonly pitched in D. Historical instruments play in a variety of just scales and pitch. Jonathan Shorland and D. Roy Saer, the then-keeper of instruments, measured and played the instruments. They concluded that the instrument made of bone was no longer playable due to splitting. Of the two elder pipes, The shorter instrument gave a six-finger key note near to F and played a scale close to the Locrian mode. The longer instrument gave a six-finger key note near to Bflat and an unnamed mode (Major scale with a flat sixth). Shorland noted that the finger hole for the sixth note was shaped differently and was significantly smaller than the rest, and that the flat note was intentional.

Contemporary pibgorn makers in Wales include Jonathan Shorland, John Tose, John Glennydd, Keith Lewis, Gafin Morgan, and Gerard KilBride. In Scotland, Julian Goodacre (double-hornpipe). In the United States; Alan Keith, Sean Folsom, and Chad Fross.

Contemporary repertoire makes use of folksong and Hymn tunes adapted to the instrument, manuscript and printed collections of dance music that may be adapted to fit the instrument's compass of an octave, as well as the general oral tradition.

Bands like Fernhill, Calan, Mordekkers, Taran, Saith Rhyfeddod, Rigantona, Carreg Lafar, Crasdant, Calennig, and Aberjaber have incorporated the instrument in their line-up in mixed consort. In the United States, bands Oceans Apart and Moch Pryderi have done the same.

Contemporary players of the instrument in Wales include Jonathan Shorland, Ceri Rhys Matthews, Stephen Rees, Andy McLaughlin, Hefin Wyn Jones, Patrick Rimes, Huw Roberts, Jem Hammond, Hafwen Lewis, Gafin Morgan, Antwn Owen Hicks, Rhodri Smith, Peni Ediker, Eva Ryan, Idris Morris Jones, Gerard KilBride, Mick Tems and Peter Stacey. Players in the United States include John Good, Bill Reese, Sean Folsom and Chad Fross. Corwen Broch is a player who lives in Scotland.

Use of pibgorn, bagpipe and bag-hornpipes with electronic and digital dance music has been seen in recent years, initially with Ceri Rhys Matthews collaborating with johnny r of r-bennig on a dance mix called "Y bibgorn aur" in 1992; later in the nineties with hip-hop outfit Y Tystion on their album "Shrug off ya complex, Y taffi triog"; Lews Tewns' recording for "PUP Project"; and "Wepun EX Project". The Mordekkers have used Drum and Bass mixes with pipe music in a live context for a number of years playing at British festivals. More recently Celtech and Taran have also combined pibgorn and pipes with Drum and Bass, Dub, and House styles.

Ceri Rhys Matthews has recorded an album of music devoted solely to traditional music on unaccompanied pibgorn and drone called "Pibddawns"

== See also ==
- Alboka, a similar Basque instrument
- Stock-and-horn, a similar Scottish instrument
- Erkencho
- Pepa, an Indian folk instrument using water buffalo horn
