= Holztrompete =

Musical instrument designed by Richard Wagner

A Holztrompete (Wooden Trumpet), generally refers to natural trumpets whose conical or cylindrical blowpipe is made of wood and can be from half a meter to five meters long. The best-known wooden trumpet is the Swiss alphorn. Their design and traditional function was as a signaling and warning instrument used by shepherds and sometimes for ritual occasions.

In classical music, one was designed by Richard Wagner for representing the natural pipe of the peasant in Tristan und Isolde. This instrument is not unlike the cor anglais in rough outline, being a conical tube of approximately the same length, terminating in a small globular bell, but having neither holes nor keys; it is blown through a cupshaped mouthpiece made of horn. The Holztrompete is in the key of C; the scale is produced by overblowing, whereby the upper partials from the 2nd to the 6th are produced. A single piston placed at a third of the distance from the mouthpiece to the bell gives the notes D and F.

Harmonic Series.

Wagner inserted a note in the score concerning the cor anglais for which the part was originally scored, and advised the use of oboe or clarinet to reinforce the latter, the effect intended being that of a powerful natural instrument, unless a wooden instrument with a natural scale be specially made for the part, which would be preferable. The Holztrompete was used at Munich for the first performance of Tristan and Isolde, and was still in use there in 1897. At Bayreuth it was also used for the Tristan performances at the festivals of 1886 and 1889, but in 1891 Wilhelm Heckel's clarina, an instrument partaking of the nature of both oboe and clarinet, was substituted for the Holztrompete and was found more effective.
