= Heckelphone-clarinet =

Wooden conical bore single reed wind instrument

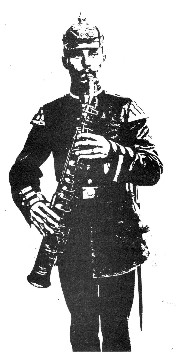
A musician playing a heckelphone-clarinet.

The heckelphone-clarinet (or Heckelphon-Klarinette) is a rare woodwind instrument, invented in 1907 by Wilhelm Heckel in Wiesbaden-Biebrich, Germany. Despite its name, it is essentially a wooden saxophone with wide conical bore, built of red-stained maple wood, overblowing the octave, and with clarinet-like fingerings. It has a single-reed mouthpiece attached to a short metal neck, similar to an alto clarinet. The heckelphone-clarinet is a transposing instrument in B♭ with sounding range of D_{3} (middle line of bass staff) to C_{6} (two ledger lines above the treble staff), written a whole tone higher. The instrument is not to be confused with the heckel-clarina, also a very rare conical bore single reed woodwind by Heckel but higher in pitch and made of metal, nor with the heckelphone, a double reed instrument lower in pitch.

== Timbre ==
The instrument sounds somewhat like a saxophone, but with a much softer tone. In his 1931 catalogue, Heckel asserts that "the clarinet-like tone of the instrument is excellent, extraordinarily harmonious, and powerful; nor is it sharp or metallic like that of the alto saxophone". It was apparently intended for military use, but never became popular, and only between twelve and fifteen were manufactured.
