= Birbynė =

Lithuanian aerophone

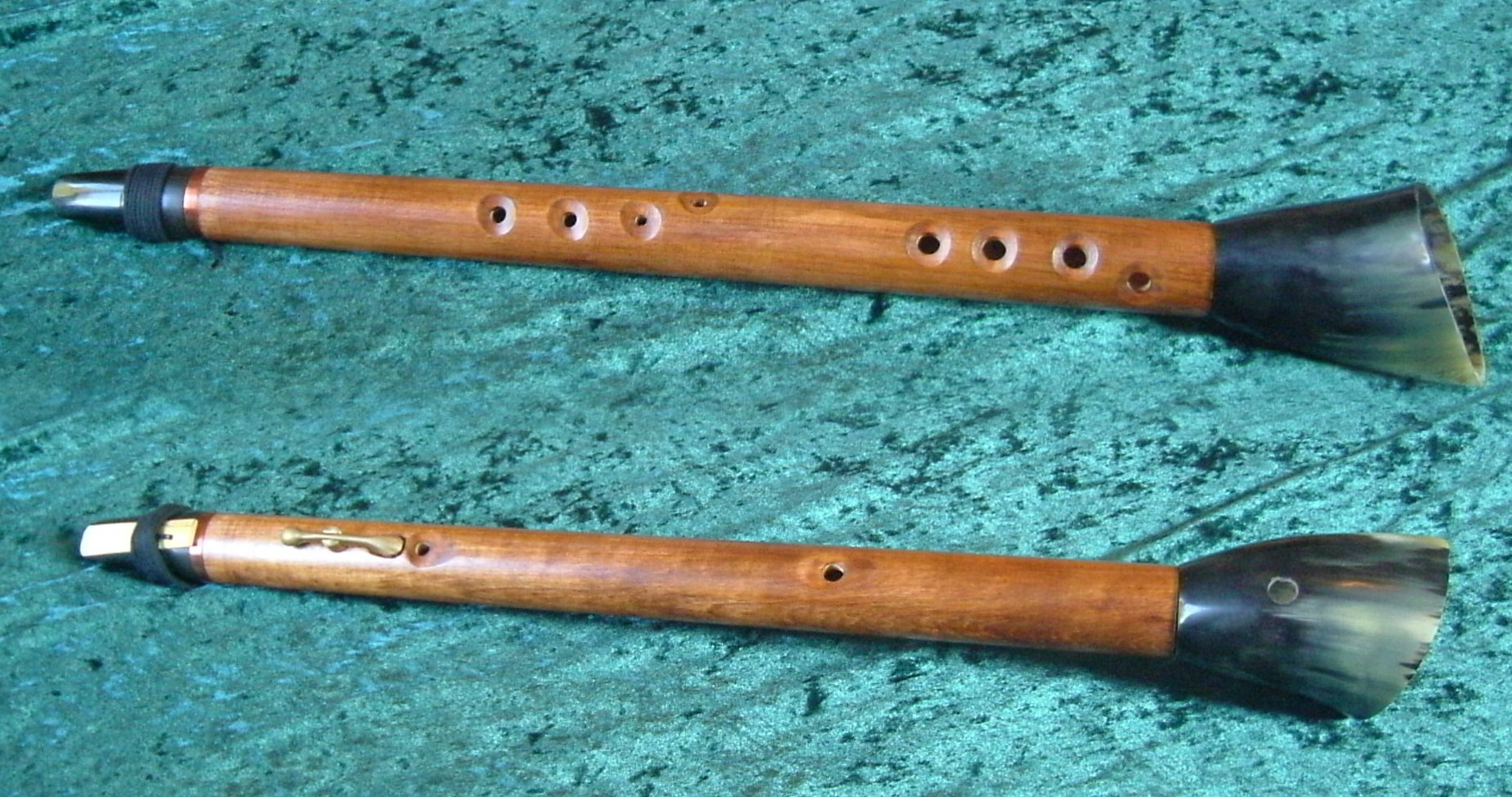
- Other names: Birbynė, klernata, parputas, ragelis
- Classification: Single reed

Related instruments
- Sorna, Rhaita, Suona, Sopila, Shawm, Zurna

A birbynė is a Lithuanian aerophone that can be either single or double-reeded and may or may not have a mouthpiece. Birbynė can be made of a variety of materials: wood, bark, horn, straw, goose feather, etc. The earliest and simplest examples were used by children as playtoys and by shepherds as a tool to control the herd. In the 19th century, influenced by classical instruments and especially the clarinet, the birbynė evolved into a serious musical instrument used in ensembles. Modern birbynės are made of wood with bells of horn and usually have ten tone holes and an octave key to access the upper registers. They are divided by pitch range into three categories: soprano, tenor, and contrabass.

The soprano birbynė is a non-transposing instrument with a range from A3 to G6 (almost three octaves). The tenor birbynė has a range of B2 to G5, and the contrabass instrument has a range of F1 to G3.

== See also ==
- Ganurags
- Zhaleika
- Erkencho
- Shofar
