= Heckel-clarina =

Single-reed woodwind instrument

The heckel-clarina, also known as clarina or patent clarina, is a very rare woodwind instrument, invented and manufactured by Wilhelm Heckel in Wiesbaden-Biebrich, Germany. Heckel received a patent for the instrument on 8 December 1889. It was apparently intended to be used for the shepherd’s pipe solo in Act III of Wagner's Tristan und Isolde. It was used beginning in 1891 at the Festspielhaus, Bayreuth as a substitute for Wagner's Holztrompete; the clarina was found more practical and more effective in producing the desired tone-colour.

The heckel-clarina is a single reed, conical bore instrument made of metal, resembling a soprano saxophone. It has the fingering of the oboe and a clarinet-type single-reed mouthpiece. Two versions were available: a sopranino in E-flat and a soprano in B-flat. According to Heckel's promotional materials, the heckel-clarina's tone resembled that of a cor anglais in its low register, a saxophone in the middle, and a clarinet in its upper range. The range of the B♭ instrument is:

Notated Pitch

Sounding Pitch

The clarina was found very effective as a solo instrument. The instrument is not to be confused with the heckelphone-clarinet, also a very rare conical bore single reed woodwind by Heckel but lower in pitch and made of wood.
