= Ganurags =

Latvian musical instrument

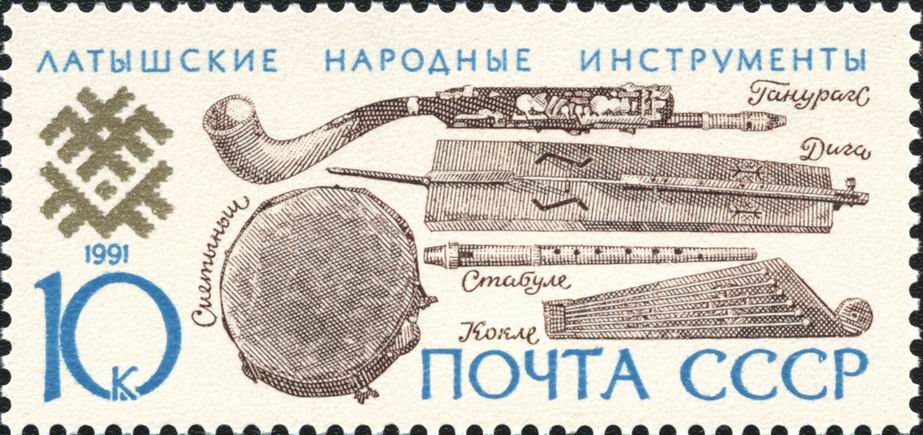
1991 USSR postage stamp featuring a modern ganurags (top instrument)

Ganurags (from Latvian: "shepherd's horn") is a Latvian folk clarinet with a cylindrical wooden body onto which an animal-horn bell is attached to amplify the sound. Key systems were added to the instrument in the 20th century.

== See also ==
- Birbynė
- Zhaleika
- Hornpipe
