= Ibon Koteron =

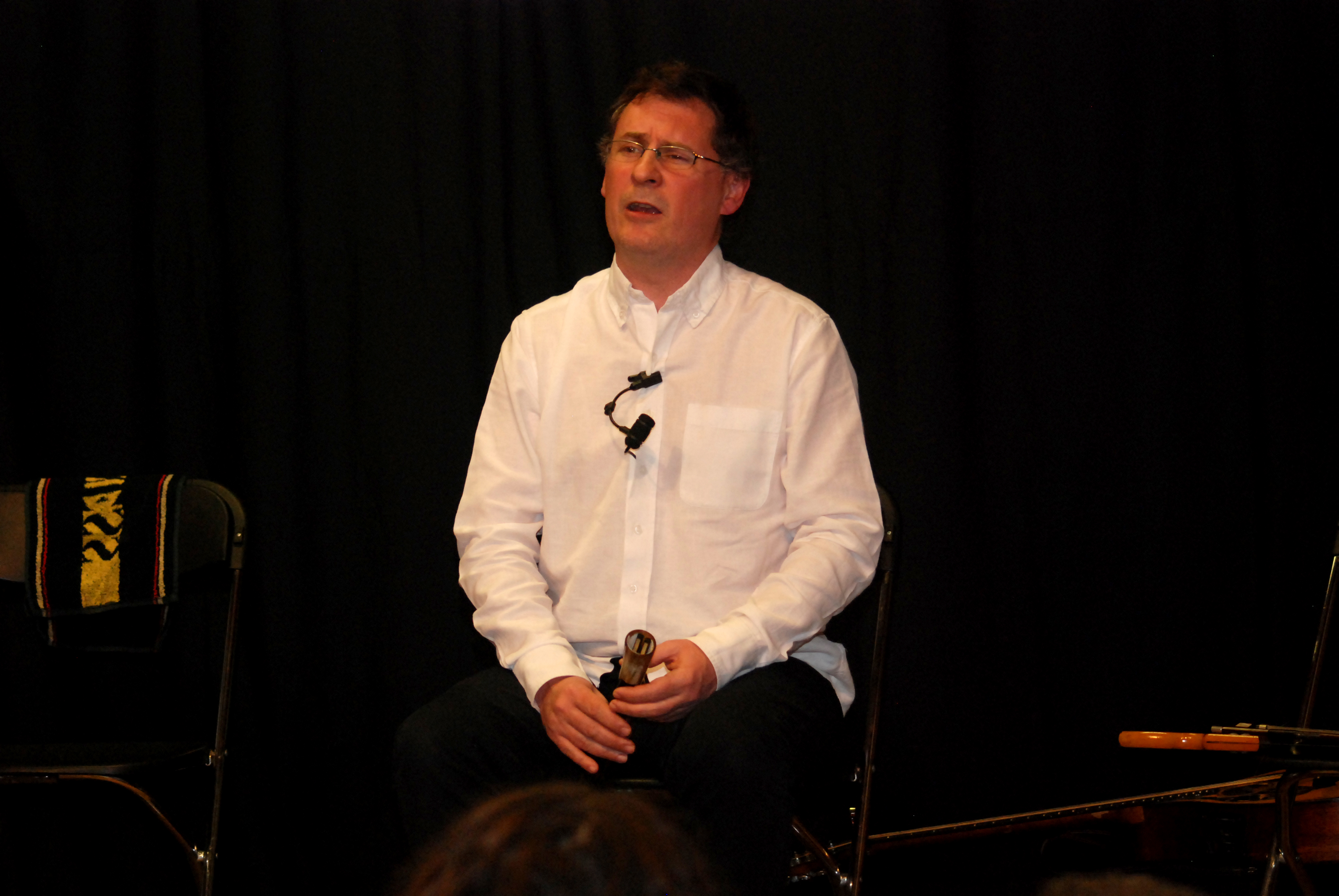
Ibon Koteron

Ibon Koteron (born in Bilbao in 1967) is a Basque musician renowned as a player of the alboka. His 1996 debut release was a joint record with Kepa Junkera, Leonen Orroak (the roarings of Leon, a homage to the great albokalari Leon Bilbao).

Koteron was educated in a Jesuit school in Bilbao. He graduated in Basque philology in the University of Deusto, but he is now teaching Philosophy in IES Ategorri, Erandio.

His career as musician started after he studied alboka and dultzaina in 1987-88 and became a teacher of these instruments himself. In the early 1990s, forming a duo with his brother, he started playing, often for free, as an accompanist to numerous popular acts, notably in support of the Conscientious Objection Movement, which was then waging a popular disobedience campaign against conscription and the army itself.

He has published articles about the alboka.

In 2004 he released a second record entitled Airea (the air), produced by Kepa Junkera.

He has also collaborated with other musicians, including Gilles Chavenat, Soledonna and Faltriqueira, Heikki Syrjänen, Andrea Pisu and Roston Kuchichian.

He leads a band that includes the following musicians:

- Iñaki Plaza – percussions, txalaparta, trikitixa
- Ion Garmendia – percussions, txalaparta, xirula
- Belen Fernandez – cello, voice
- Unai Frantsesena – keys, percussions, txalaparta
- Ibon Koteron – alboka, flute, voice
