= Zhaleika =

Slavic wind instrument

- Zhaleika

Woodwind instrument
- Other names: Zhalomeika, sopel’, pishchelka, fletnya, duda, zgaleyka, zhalijka, rizhok
- Classification: Single-reed aerophone
- Hornbostel–Sachs classification: 422.211.2
- Timbre: Piercing and nasal, sad and compassionate
- Volume: High
- Attack: Fast
- Decay: Fast

Related instruments
- Hornpipe, clarinet, pishchiki

Musicians
- V.V. Andreyev

The zhaleika (Russian: жале́йка), also known as bryolka (брёлка), is a Slavic wind instrument, most used in Belarusian, Russian and sometimes Ukrainian ethnic music. Also known as a "folk clarinet" or hornpipe. The zhaleika was eventually incorporated into the balalaika band, the Hungarian tarogato, and may have contributed to the development of the chalumeau, a predecessor of the clarinet.

== Construction and design ==
The zhaleika consists of a single reed that can be covered by a mouthpiece (or "wind cap"). The design consists of a wooden barrel (pipe) with finger holes and a flared bell that can be made of either natural or man-made materials. It can either consist of a single or a double pipe.

The single pipe is about 10–20 cm long with 3 to 7 finger holes. The reed is made out of either cane or goose feather, and the end bell is made of cow horn or birch bark. The double type consists of two pipes and one bell, and is found mainly in the southern parts of Russia.

== Tuning ==
The zhaleika has diatonic tuning and comes in various keys (G, A, D, sometimes C, E, F). It has a natural or "normal" soprano voice, but can perform in alto or piccolo forms. It is tuned by adjusting the reed and can be tuned to the major scale or mixolydian mode with flattened 7th note. Only an octave's worth of notes can be played. Its timbre is described as "piercing and nasal, sad and compassionate". There are some chromatic variations of modern zhaleika too.

== Origination and uses ==
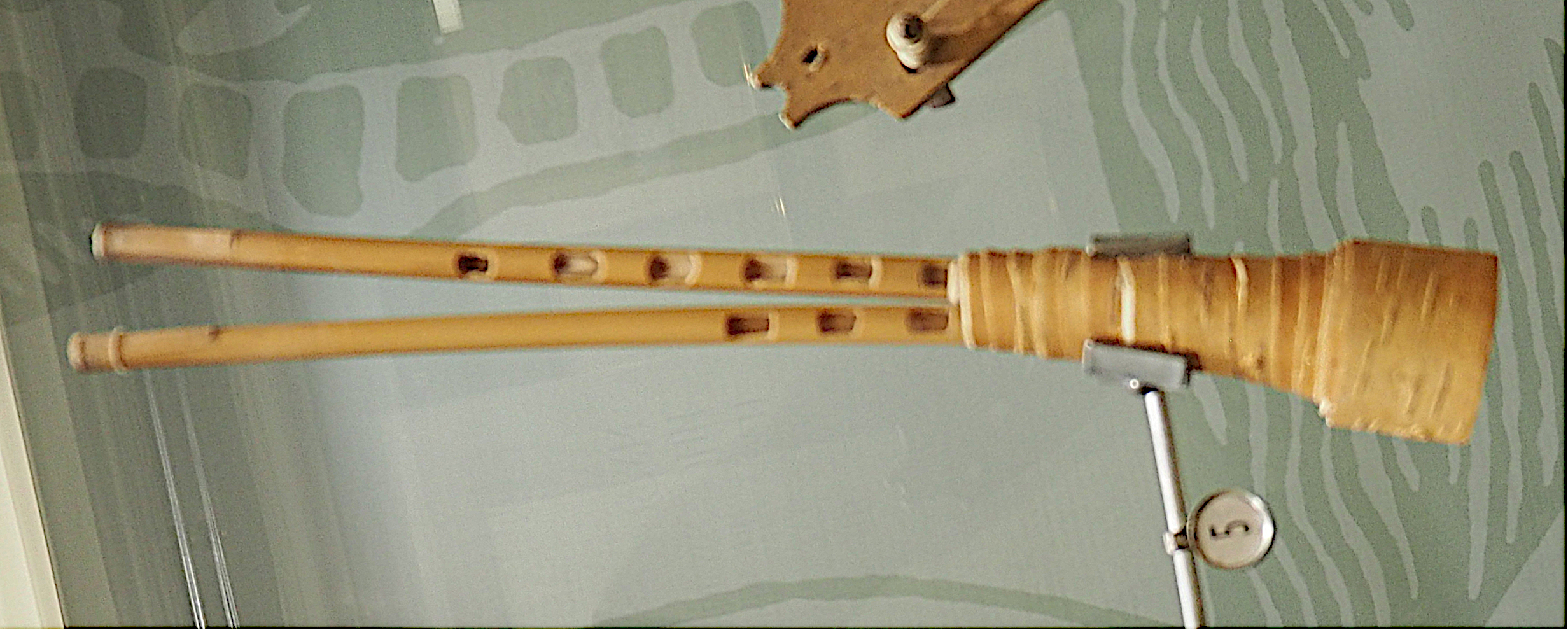
Double Zhaleika reed pipes, Belarus. Pipes have a split in the sidewall at the top, going with the grain to create a reed. Unlike the hornpipe version, this has no cap or protective cover to blow into; the musician puts the tip in the mouth.

The zhaleika was a shepherd's instrument used to perform solos, duets, or ensemble pieces. The earliest single-reed pipe instruments date back to about 2700 BCE in Egypt, where most of these instruments most commonly had double pipes and used idioglot reeds. The earliest evidence of the zhaleika was in A. Tuchkov's notes dating back to the late 18th century. It was widely spread in Russia, Belarus, Ukraine, and Lithuania, but now can only be seen in folk music orchestras. In 1900, V. V. Andreyev incorporated a modified zhaleika - called bryolka - into orchestras. It consisted of a double-reed oboe type with additional finger holes and vents for chromatic scale.

In Slavic cultures zhaleika was a well known funeral instrument and its name is near to a word that means "compassionate". Zhaleika sounds in many compositions of Belarusian folk-metal band Znich, Ukrainian metal bands Chur and HASPYD, Ukrainian ethnic band DakhaBrakha. Zhaleika sound like a one piped bagpipe.

== See also ==
- Ganurags
- Birbynė
- Hornpipe
- Clarinet
- Erke
- Erkencho
