= Crwth =

Welsh musical instrument

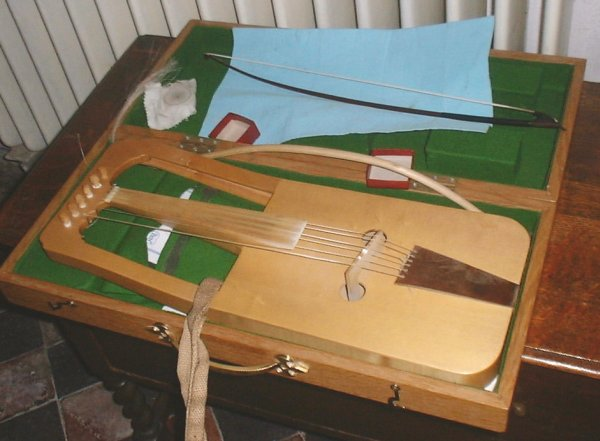
- Classification: Bowed string instrument

Related instruments
- Cithara; Lyre; Byzantine lyra; Jouhikko; Rotte; Talharpa

See Rotte for the psaltery, or Rotte for the plucked lyre.

The crwth (/kruːθ/ KROOTH, Welsh: [kruːθ]), also called a crowd or rote or crotta, is a bowed lyre, a type of stringed instrument, associated particularly with Welsh music, now archaic but once widely played in Europe. Four historical examples have survived and are to be found in St Fagans National Museum of History (Cardiff); National Library of Wales (Aberystwyth); Warrington Museum & Art Gallery; and the Museum of Fine Arts, Boston (US).

== Origin of the name ==
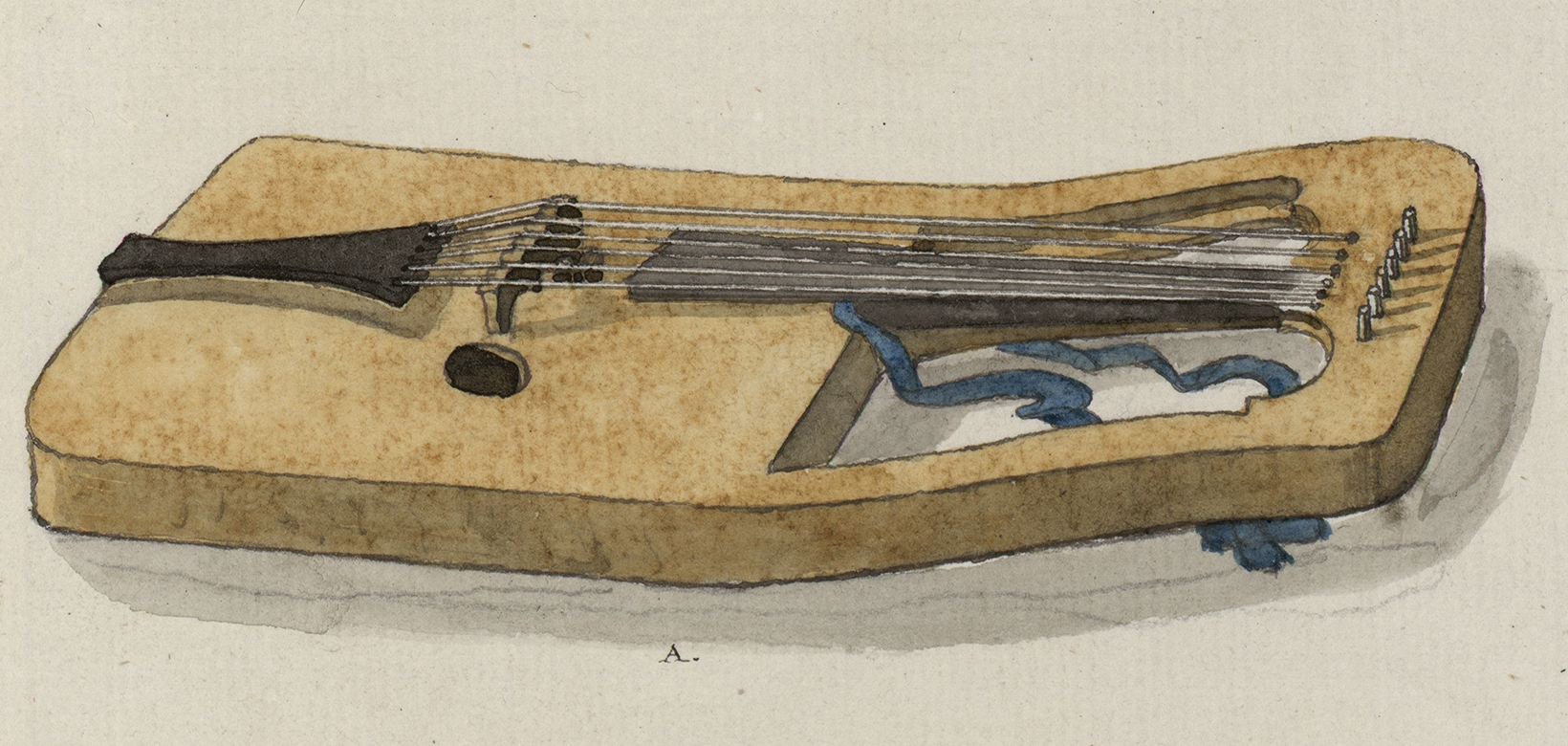
Watercolour of a crwth from Pennant's A tour in Wales, 1781

The name crwth is Welsh, derived from a Proto-Celtic noun *krutto- ("round object") which refers to a swelling or bulging out, a pregnant appearance or a protuberance, and it is speculated that it came to be used for the instrument because of its bulging shape. Other Celtic words for violin also have meanings referring to rounded appearance. In Gaelic, for example, "cruit" can mean "hump" or "hunch" as well as harp or violin. Like several other English loanwords from Welsh, the name is among the few words in the English language in which the letter W alone is used to indicate a vowel.

The traditional English name is crowd (or rote), and the variants crwd, crout and crouth are little-used today. In Medieval Latin it is called the chorus or crotta. The Welsh word crythor means a performer on the crwth. The Irish word is cruit, although it also was used on occasion to designate certain small harps. The English surnames Crewther, Crowder, Crother and Crowther denote a player of the crowd, as do the Scottish names MacWhirter and MacWhorter.

For this article's purposes, crwth denotes the modern, or most recent, form of the instrument (see picture).

== History ==
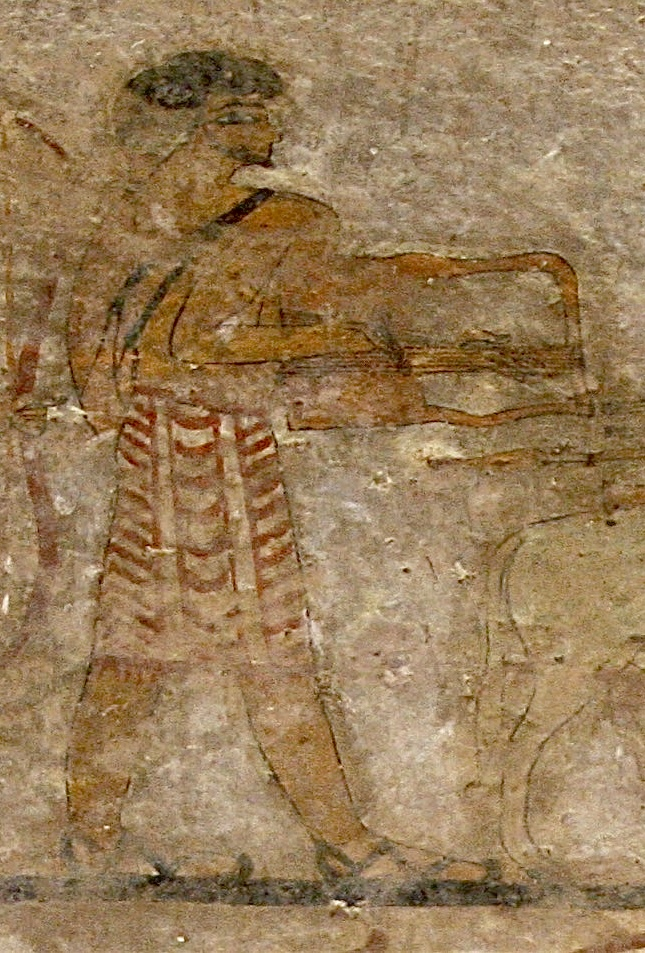
Asiatic Kithara from an Egyptian fresco in the tomb of Khnumhotep II at Beni Hassan, circa 20th century B.C. Strings have been narrowed, and adding fingerboard would create the crwth and plucked guitar fiddles.

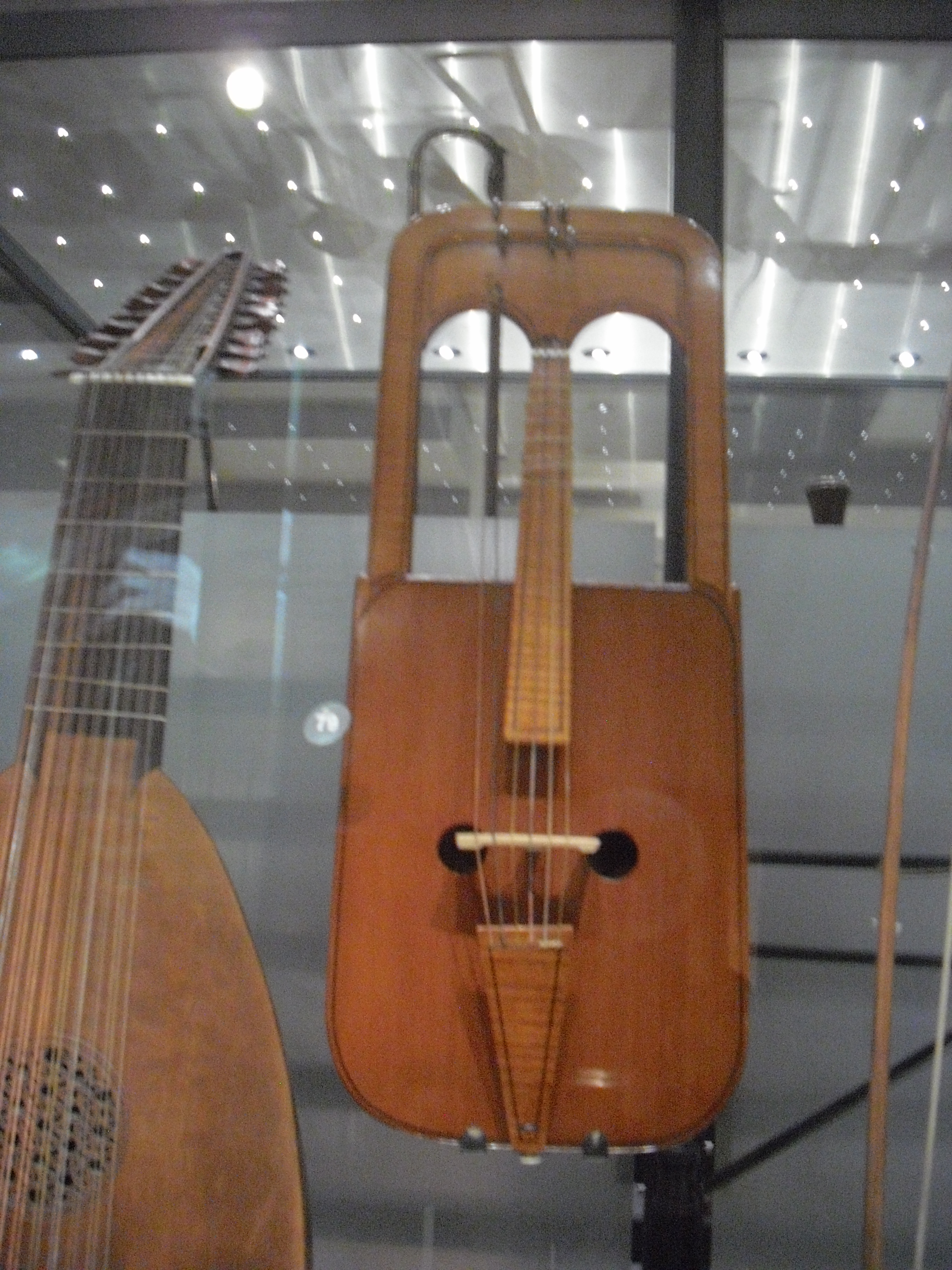
A crwth in the Horniman Museum, London, England

The crwth is a very old instrument, which Aenantius Fortunatus, as early as about 609 A.D, specifies as British (chrotta Britanna canit). The chrotta was originally strung with three, later with six, strings, and was played with a bow. It is quite possible that the chrotta is the oldest bowed instrument and the antecessor to the violin.

A variety of string instruments so designated are thought to have been played in Wales since at least Roman times. Continuous, clear records of the use of crwth to denote an instrument of the lyre (or the Byzantine bowed lyre) class date from the 11th century. Medieval instruments somewhat resembling the crwth appear in pictures (first in Continental Europe) as far back as the 11th century, shortly after bowing was first known in the West. In Wales, the crwth long took second place to the harp in the musical hierarchy.

Schlesinger in the 1911 Encyclopædia Britannica mentioned the crwth in an article about transition of instruments from the lyre to plucked and bowed instruments:

...The rotta represents the first step in the evolution of the cithara, when arms and cross-bar were replaced by a frame joined to the body, the strings being usually restricted to eight or less...The next step was the addition of a finger-board and the consequent reduction of the strings to three or four, since each string was now capable of producing several notes...As soon as the neck was added to the guitar-shaped body, the instrument ceased to be a rotta and became a guitar (q.v.), or a guitar-fiddle (q.v.) if played with the bow."

== Physical description and playing technique ==
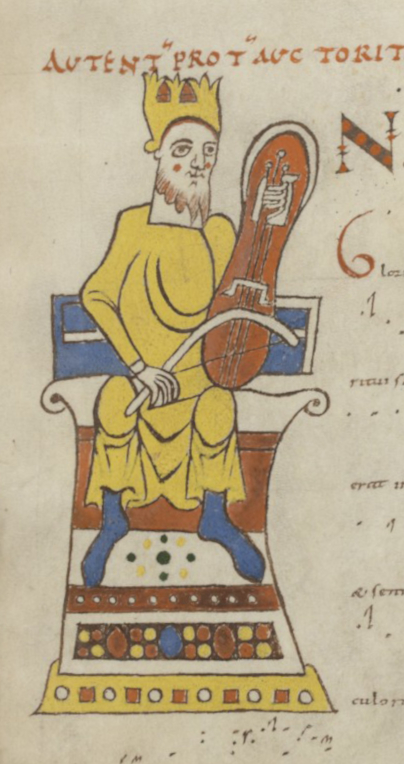
1029 A.D., Abbey of Saint Martial, Limoges. Crwth from the Troparium et prosarium Sancti Martialis Lemovicensis, BNF Latin 1118, folio 104.

The crwth consists of a fairly simple box construction with a flat, fretless fingerboard and six gut strings, purportedly tuned gg´c´c´´d´d´´. The original report of that tuning (Edward Jones, Musical and Poetical Relicks of the Welsh Bards; London: 1784), from which most subsequent others appear to draw their information, uses arbitrary pitch designations for illustrative purposes. Jones also states that the tuning procedure began by tightening the highest string as much as possible without breaking it, subsequently tuning the others to it intervallically. Such was not an uncommon practice in the days before standardized pitch and was, in fact, mentioned in other manuals on string instrument playing.

While Jones's report was widely read and used as the basis of a number of subsequent accounts, and therefore today is often considered to be evidence of a standard tuning, it is more likely that a variety of tunings were experimented with and in some cases employed, as was and still is the case with many other string instruments, particularly those within folk cultures. A second tuning, reported by William Bingley (A Tour Round North Wales; London: 1800), features the drones tuned in octaves, with the strings over the fingerboard tuned in paired fifths rather than seconds. However this tuning is almost certainly derived from later violin playing and is impractical given that the crwth is equipped with a flat bridge and therefore designed to play all six strings simultaneously.

Traditionally the soundbox, or resonator, and a surmounting yoke in the shape of an inverted U (see picture of player), were carved as a single unit from a block of maple or sycamore. The soundboard, or belly, a separate piece (the upper surface, nearest the strings), was most often made of deal or some other soft wood, and the bridge was usually made of cherry or some other fruitwood. Two soundholes, or circular openings about an inch to an inch and a quarter in diameter, were cut into the soundboard to allow pulsating air from the soundbox to escape and strengthen the tone. The two G strings (to use Jones's terminology – see above) ran parallel to the fingerboard, but not over it, so those strings were used as fixed-pitch drones which could be plucked by the player's left thumb. The remaining strings, which were tightened and loosened with metal harp wrest-pins and a tuning key or wrench, were usually bowed with a horsehair and wood bow. One characteristic feature of the crwth is that one leg of the bridge goes through a soundhole (see picture of player) and rests on the back of the instrument (the bottom of the soundbox). Although it has been conjectured that this is a primitive attempt at a sound post, or anima, something the instrument lacks, it is equally likely that it is designed to take some of the downward pressure of the tightened strings off the soundboard. Since that piece is flat, unbraced, and usually made of soft wood, it is much weaker than the belly of a violin.

All surviving pictures of crwth players show a playing position with the lower end of the crwth braced against the chest, supported with a strap around the player's neck (see picture). The sound of the crwth was described by medieval poet Gruffydd ap Dafydd ap Hywel as 'in the hand a hundred voices' (yn y llaw yn gan llais'), referring to the rich sound of six strings sounded simultaneously in harmony. Along with the harp and timpan, the six-stringed crwth was one of the three main string instruments of the Welsh according to the medieval Triads, and an instrument of the aristocracy with its own native repertoire and a strict examination system though which a master crwth player had to pass. A three-stringed version also existed which required less skill and was played by minstrels.

The tone of the crwth is softer and rougher than the modern violin, and has a comfortable melody range of an octave by the use of third position, although it is possible to reach an octave and a half by the use of higher positions. Its sound complements the timbres of the harp and pibgorn (hornpipe). For all its technical limitations, the crwth has great charm, and is much more than a historical curiosity. Research over about the last thirty-five years, and particularly experimentation with tunings, have shown it to have been much more versatile and facile than was once assumed, although it definitely was not a prototype of modern orchestral bowed string instruments, which emerged from an altogether different branch of the complex string family tree. Historically, it represents the logical end of a line of development, not an early stage of another.

== Welsh legends ==
There are a number of legends in Wales related to Crythor Du or "The Black (Haired) Crwth Player", the most notable of which is "Y Crythor Du a'r Bleiddiaid" or "The Black (Haired) Crwth Player and the Wolves", where the main character escapes attack from a pack of hungry wolves by playing in turn forcefully, melodiously and gently. Another legend has a player and his servant dying of cold in Beddgelert, noted by Welsh antiquarian Edward Lhuyd. There is also the "Cave of the black crwth player" near Criccieth, which is said to have been the inspiration for the tune Ffarwél Ned Puw or 'Farewell Dick the Piper'.

== Today ==
A number of modern reconstructions of the crwth have been made; makers include Guy Flockhart, Nial Cain, Michael J. King, Hank Taylor and Gerard Kilbride. A handful of folk musicians are reviving the tradition of playing this instrument, among them Cass Meurig, who is the best-known modern player and who in 2004 released the album Crwth, the world's second CD of crwth music, in 2004 on the Fflach:tradd label. (Meurig also plays with the groups Fernhill and Pigyn Clust.) Other musicians include Bob Evans (Bragod), Dan Morris (Cilmeri), and Sedayne. The repertoire of surviving crwth tunes is very small, although many other traditional tunes can be adapted for the instrument and new tunes are being written for it. It is also used by several early music groups, including Cancionero.

== See also ==
- Tromba marina
