= Fernhill (band) =

Welsh folk group

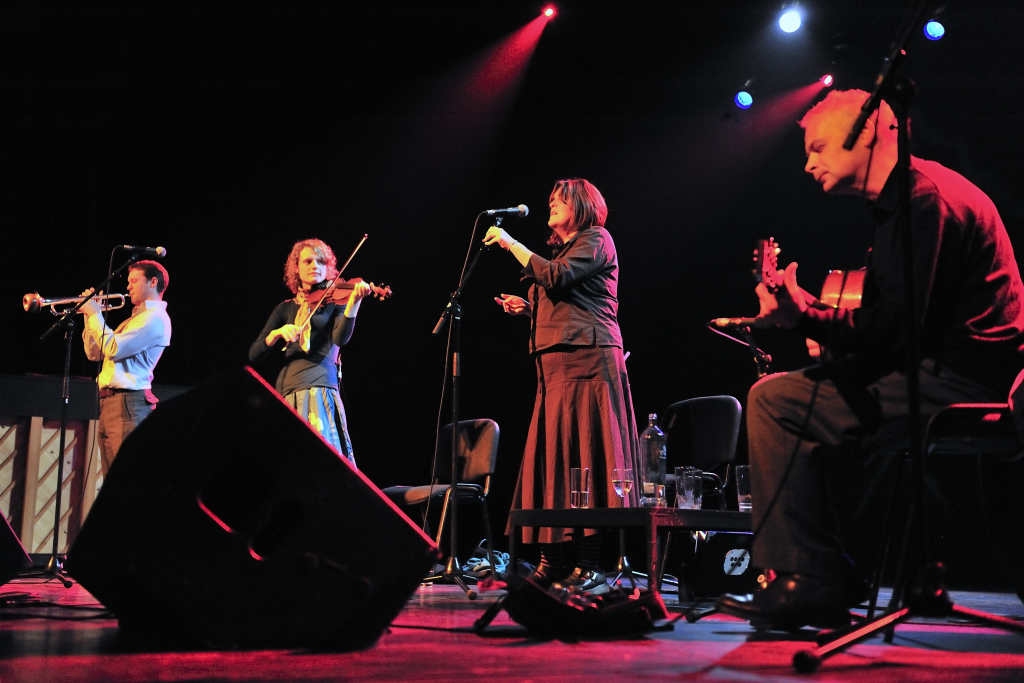
- Fernhill playing Welsh folk music in concert in Lommel, Belgium, 2009

Background information
- Origin: Swansea, Wales
- Genres: Welsh traditional music Folk
- Years active: 1996–present
- Labels: Beautiful Jo Records; Disgyfrith
- Members: Julie Murphy; Ceri Rhys Matthews; Tomos Williams; Christine Cooper; Guests; Dorian Phillips aka Nobsta Nutts; Tim Harris; Chris O'Connor; Jon Gower
- Past members: Andy Cutting; Jonathan Shorland; Cass Meurig
- Website: fernhill.info

Fernhill is a Welsh folk band formed in 1996. They have been described by music critic and journalist Colin Irwin, as "highly regarded, innovative cultural ambassadors for Wales and its folk music, having toured in over 20 countries in four continents". Their style is described as "intimate enough with the tradition, that they are unafraid to stretch its boundaries." Stephen Rees has said of them "Their work has not only been unique but has moved and changed also over the years. They are impossible to imitate."

== Band members ==
The current line-up is Julie Murphy, voice; Ceri Rhys Matthews, guitar and flute; Tomos Williams, trumpet; Christine Cooper, fiddle and voice.

The original line-up, alongside Murphy and Matthews, included Andy Cutting, accordions, 1996–2002; and Jonathan Shorland, flute and bagpipes, 1996–1999. Cass Meurig, crwth and fiddle, played with the band between 2000 and 2004. Cutting and Shorland appeared on the first two albums, Ca' nôs and Llatai. The line-up on Whilia was Murphy, Matthews and Cutting. Guest musicians were Tim Harris on upright bass and Cass Meurig on fiddle, who later joined the band full-time. The line-up on hynt was Murphy, Matthews, Williams, Meurig, Tim Harris, and Dorian Phillips AKA Nobsta Nutts rapper. In 2004, Meurig was replaced by Christine Cooper on fiddle. However, the 2007 live album Na Prádle, recorded at the Na Prádle club in Prague, Czech Republic only features Murphy, Matthews and Williams. Cooper is featured on their two latest albums; Canu Rhydd and Amser on fiddle and spoken word. In concerts, the band occasionally work with guest poet Jon Gower, writer Owen Martell or rapper, Nobsta Nutts.

== Touring highlights ==
International appearances include Festival De Cornouaille, Quimper; Telemark, Kaustinen; Brosella jazz and folk, Brussels; Festival Interceltique de Lorient; major concerts in Athens; Rome; Brussels and Tokyo. British Council tours of Vietnam, Poland, the Czech Republic, three separate tours in southern and east Africa and in 2014 a tour in Buenos Aires and Patagonia. The group's album, Na Prádle made the Mojo (magazine) top ten folk album list in 2007. The album captures highlights of an intimate concert in Prague recorded and broadcast by Czech radio 3 during a tour of the Czech Republic in 2006.

== Discography ==
- Ca' nôs (Beautiful Jo Records, 1996)
- Llatai (Beautiful Jo Records, 1998)
- Whilia (Beautiful Jo Records, 2000)
- hynt (Beautiful Jo Records, 2003)
- Na Prádle (live) (Beautiful Jo Records, 2007)
- Canu Rhydd (disgyfrith, 2011)
- Amser (disgyfrith, 2014)
