= Julie Murphy (singer) =

English singer (born 1961)

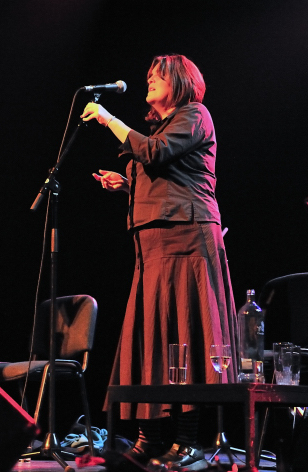
Murphy performing with Fernhill in the Netherlands

Julie Murphy (born 1961) is an English singer. She sings in the Welsh folk group Fernhill, as well as performing and recording as a solo artist. She has also collaborated musically with John Cale (performing together in the film Beautiful Mistake), and Afro Celt Sound System (in a duet with Robert Plant of Led Zeppelin).

== Biography ==
Murphy was born in Highgate, London, but spent her formative years in Romford. Her family was originally from Blackpool, Lancashire. She attended Maidstone College of Art and subsequently moved to Wales. She sings both in English and Welsh.

== Discography ==
=== Solo albums and EPs ===
- Black Mountains Revisited (1999)
- Lilac Tree (2002)
- The Fall – EP (2011)
- A Quiet House (2012)
- Mermaid – EP (2014)
- Every Bird That Flies (2016)

=== Fernhill albums ===
- Ca' nôs (Beautiful Jo Records, 1996)
- Llatai (Beautiful Jo Records, 1998)
- Whilia (Beautiful Jo Records, 2000)
- hynt (Beautiful Jo Records, 2003)
- Na Prádle (live) (Beautiful Jo Records, 2007)
- Canu Rhydd (disgyfrith, 2011)

=== Collaborative albums ===
- Ffawd (2000), with Dylan Fowler
- English Songs of Love (2001), with Lynne Denman and Joanne Acty

=== Whirling Pope Joan (Julie Murphy and Nigel Eaton) ===
- Spin (1994)
