= Kepa Junkera =

Spanish Basque musician

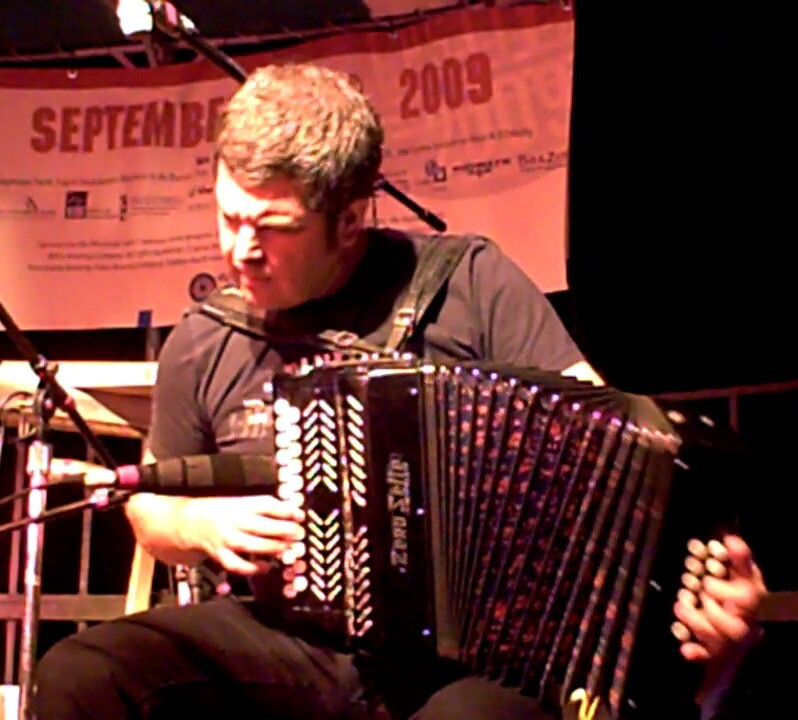
Junkera in 2009

Kepa Junkera Urraza (born 1965 in Bilbao, Euskadi, Spain) is a Basque musician and composer. A master of the trikitixa, the diatonic accordion, he has recorded more than 10 albums. Junkera won the Latin Grammy Award for Best Folk Album in 2004 for his album K.

== Discography ==
Albums

- Infernuko Auspoa - Kepa, Zabaleta eta Motriku (1986)
- Triki Up - Kepa, Zabaleta eta Imanol (1990)
- Trikitixa Zoom (1991)
- Trans-Europe Diatonique - Kepa Junkera, John Kirkpatrick and Riccardo Tesi (1993)
- Kalejira Al-buk (1994)
- Lau Eskutara - Kepa Junkera and Julio Pereira (1995)
- Leonen Orroak - Kepa Junkera and Ibon Koteron (1996)
- Bilbao 00:00h (1998) Alula Records
- Tricky! (2000)
- Maren (2001)
- K (2003)
- Athletic Bihotzez (2004)
- Hiri (2006)
- Etxea (2008)
- Fandango - Provença Sessions (2009)
- Kalea (2009)
- Fandango - Habana Sessions (2010)
- Beti Bizi (2010)
- Herria (2010)
- Ultramarinos & Coloniales (2011)
- Ipar Haizea Kepa Junkera with the Orquesta Sinfónica de Euskadi (2011)
- Galiza (2013)
- ”Kepa Junkera & Sorginak – Trikitixaren historia txiki bat/Una pequeña historia de la trikitixa (2014)
- Kepa Junkera & Sorginak – Maletak (2016)
- Kepa Junkera - Fok (2017)
