= Stock-and-horn =

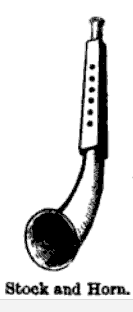

The stock-and-horn was a traditional instrument of the Scottish peasantry, very similar to the Welsh pibgorn, consisting of a single-reed reed pipe amplified by a bell made of horn. The original instrument of the Middle Ages had a double chanter with single reeds but was replaced by the single chanter type. The single chanter instrument is described in great detail by Robert Burns in a 1794 letter to a contemporary; Burns describes how he had much difficulty coming by the instrument, and notes that it has six or seven fingerholes on the top, one on the back, and is played with a single reed ("oaten reed") unfixed to the instrument but held by the lips.

== See also ==
- Alboka, a similar Basque instrument
- Pibgorn, a similar Welsh instrument
