= Alboka =

Traditional Basque woodwind instrument

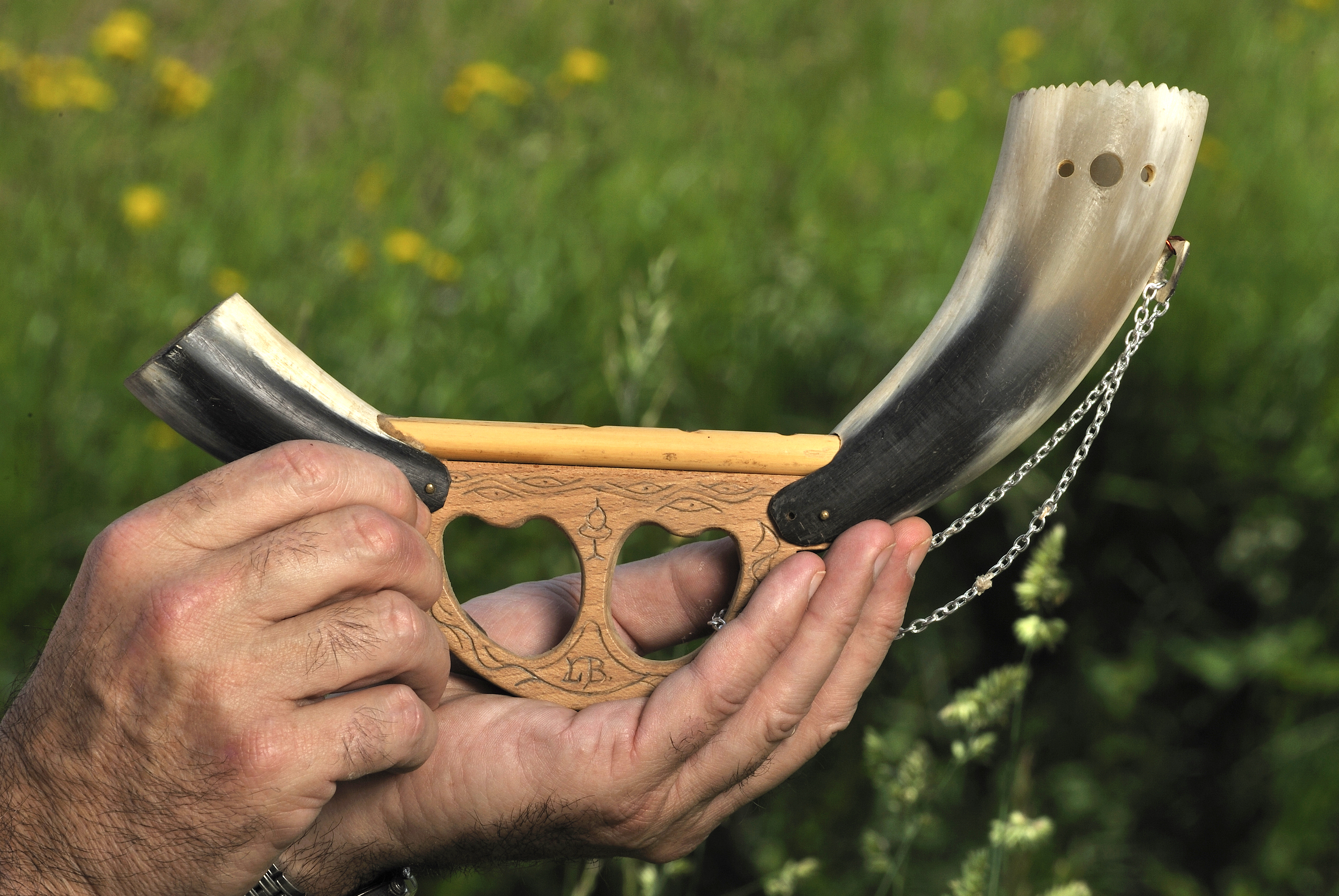
A basque traditional alboka

Video of an alboka being played

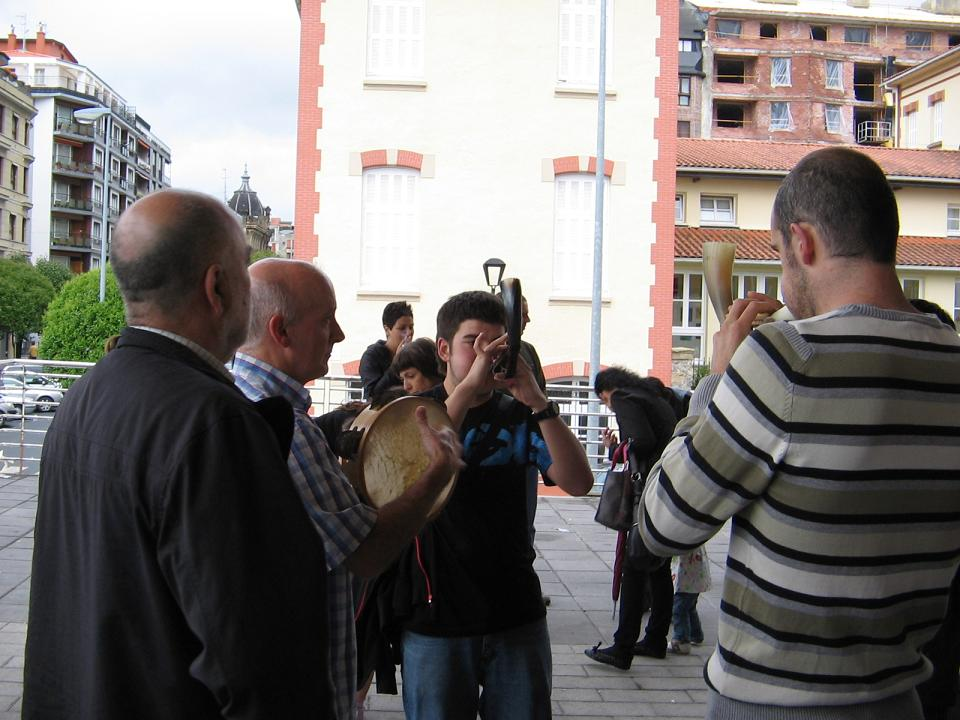
Alboka players in Hernani

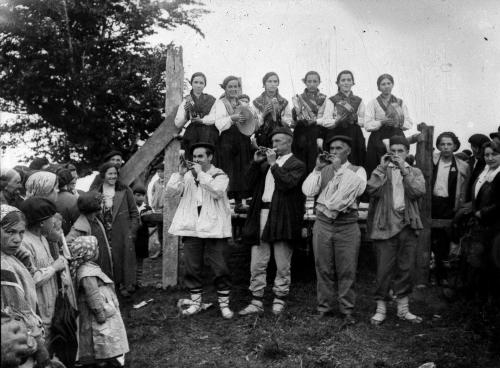
Alboka players in Zeanuri

The Basque alboka (Spanish: albogue) is a single-reed woodwind instrument consisting of a single reed, two small diameter melody pipes with finger holes and a bell traditionally made from animal horn. Additionally, a reed cap of animal horn is placed around the reed to contain the breath and allow circular breathing for constant play. In the Basque language, an alboka player is called albokari. The alboka is usually used to accompany a tambourine singer.

Although the alboka is native to the Basque region, similar instruments can be found around Spain including Madrid (gaita serrana), Asturias (turullu), and Castile and Andalusia (gaita gastorena), but in those cases they only have a single pipe. The name is derived from the Arabic al-bûq (البوق), which means "the trumpet" or "the horn".

Hornpipes are made of a single reed, a small diameter melody pipe with fingerholes, and a bell traditionally made of animal horn. An animal horn reed cap usually encompasses the idioglot reed. These instruments are descended from single-reed idioglot instruments found in Egypt as early as 2700 BCE. During the Old Kingdom in Egypt (2778-2723 BCE), memets were depicted on the reliefs of seven tombs at Saqqarra, six tombs at Giza, and the pyramids of Queen Khentkaus. Horns were later added to the reed pipe to increase resonance. Horn caps were also added around the reed, and the player would blow into the hornpipe to activate the reed instead of holding it in their mouth.

The alboka has two cane pipes, a wood handle, and a horn at each end. It may be descended from the Moroccan double hornpipe, which has two cane pipes, each fitted with a cow horn. The alboka was established in Spain by the end of the 13th-century. Representations of it can be found in the Poema de Alexandre and surviving medieval sculptural church decorations.

Notable Alboka players are Ibon Koteron and Alan Griffin. It is also being integrated into modern bands, such as Kalakan.

== Varieties ==
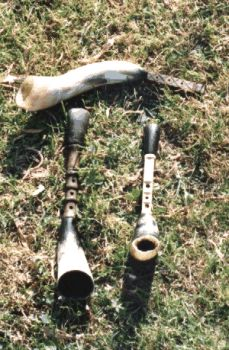
above: Gaita gastore; below: Gaitas serranas

The Albogues include:

- The gaita gastore ( gaita del Gastor in Cádiz ) has a body made of pear or oleander wood decorated with a cross-shaped pattern, three finger holes on the top and one on the bottom, and a relatively long horn as a bell. It is played on saint's days and at Christmas.
- The gaita serrana ( gaita de la sierra in Madrid ) has a wind cap made of cow horn, a sound tube made of wood (usually fig wood ) and square recesses in which the finger holes are located. The sound tube can have a round or square cross-section. The instrument has three to four finger holes on the top and a thumb hole. The bell is also made of cow horn. The gaita serrana was a pure shepherd's instrument that served as a pastime. With the decline of the profession, it has practically died out.
- The best known instrument of this group is the Basque alboka with double sound tubes that have a common wind cap and a common horn bell. All parts of the instrument are attached to a semicircular wooden arch (see Alboka ).
- In Gascony, on the northwestern edge of the Pyrenees, the caramera ( caremère ) is played. It has a reed, a simple sound tube and an animal horn. The number of finger holes can be 6 + 1. [ 4 ]
- The chifla de Campoo (from the town of Campoo in Cantabria ) is not a hornpipe, but is related to the albogues. A sound pipe is made from a piece of wood about 25 cm long, with a small wooden funnel at the top and a large one at the bottom. The large funnel serves as a sound funnel, the upper one as a kind of wind cap. The reed is held loosely between the lips and blown inside this wind cap. The instrument has four to seven finger holes on the top.

== Gallery ==
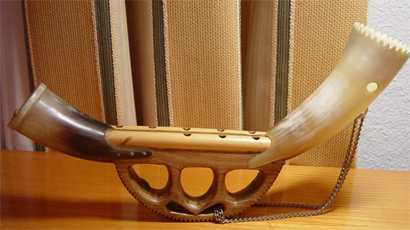
An alboka on a table.

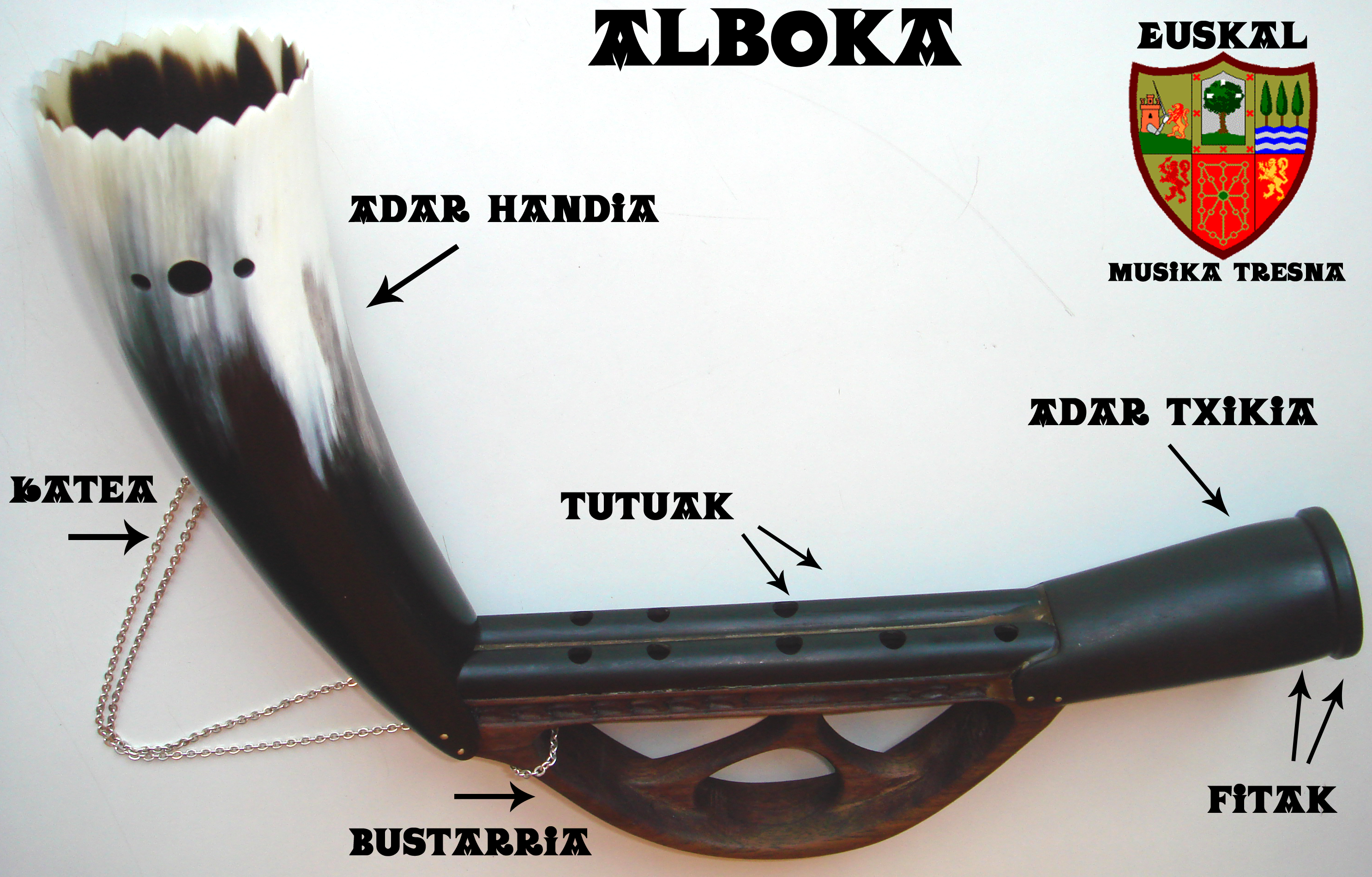
A diagram of an alboka in the Basque language.

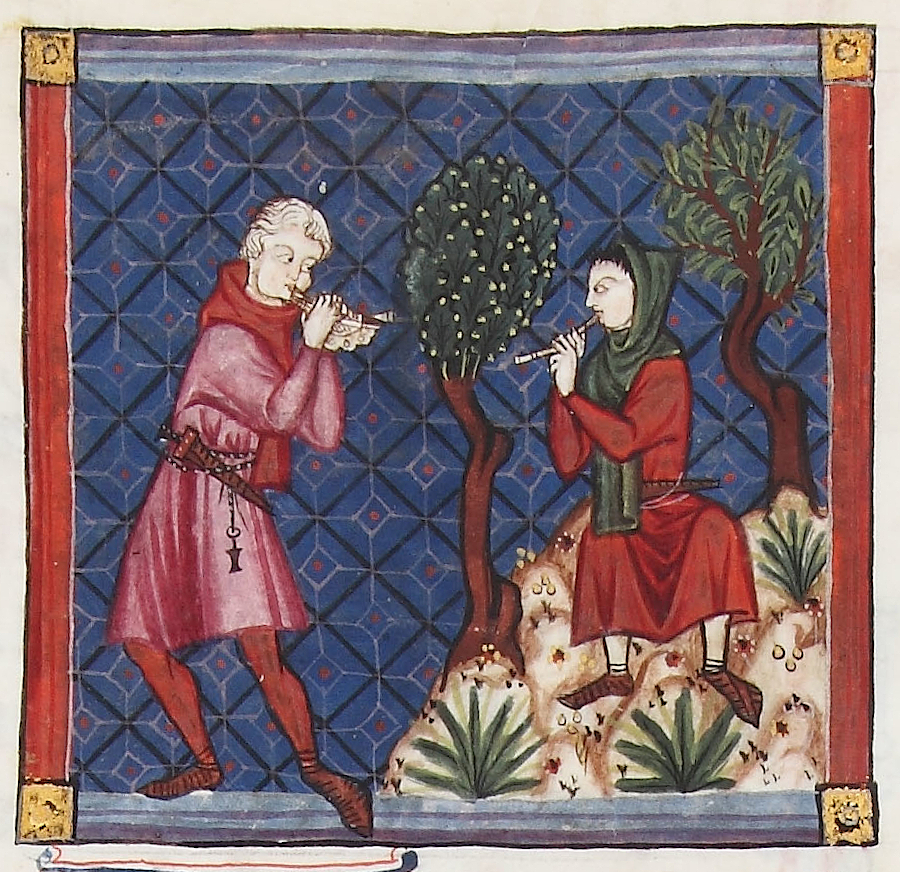
1280 A.D. Two alboka players.

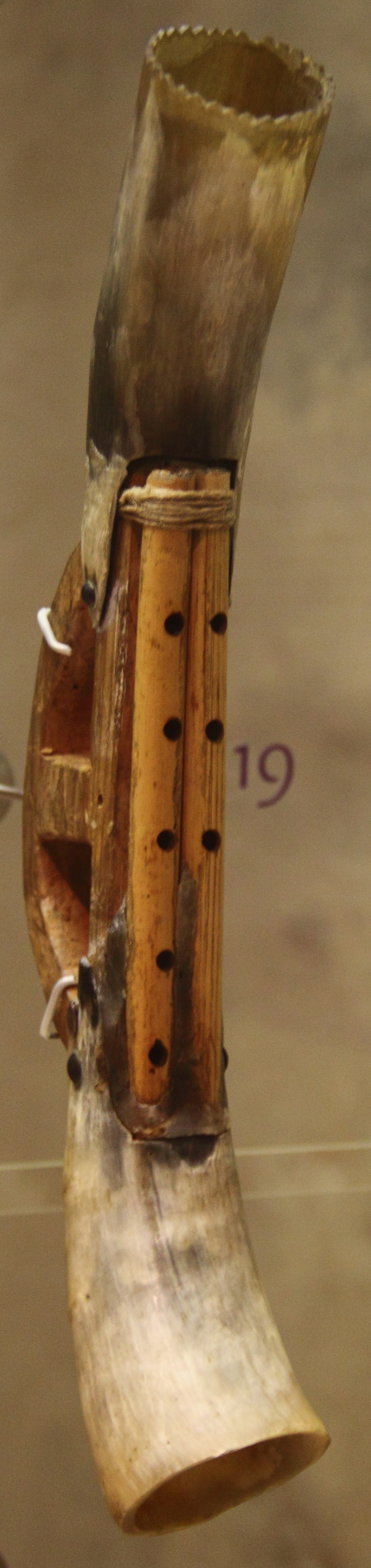
An alboka standing upright.

== See also ==
- Basque music
- Ibon Koteron
- Hornpipe (musical instrument)
- Stock-and-horn, a similar Scottish instrument
- Pibgorn, a similar Welsh instrument
- Erkencho

== Bibliography ==
- Barrenchea, José Mariano y Riezu, P. Jorge de, "Alboka. Entorno folklórico" Archivo Padre Donostia. Lecaroz (Navarra), 1976.

== Discography ==
- Alboka (musical group) Lorius
- Bidaia Oihan
- Kepa Junkera & Ibon Koteron Leonen Orroak
