= Hornpipe (instrument) =

Instrument

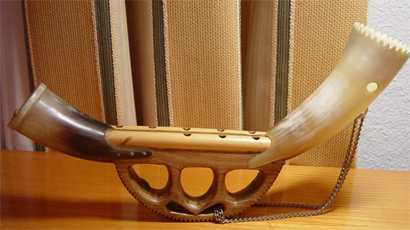
The Basque alboka, a type of hornpipe.

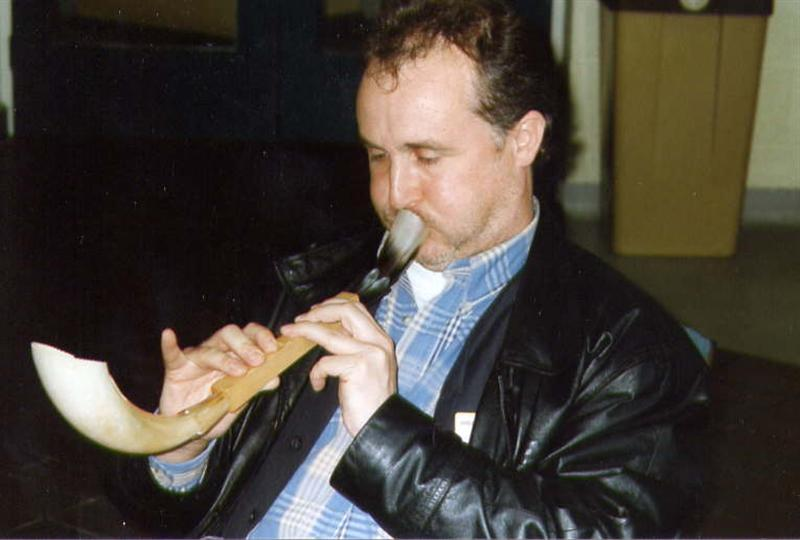
The pibgorn, a Welsh hornpipe.

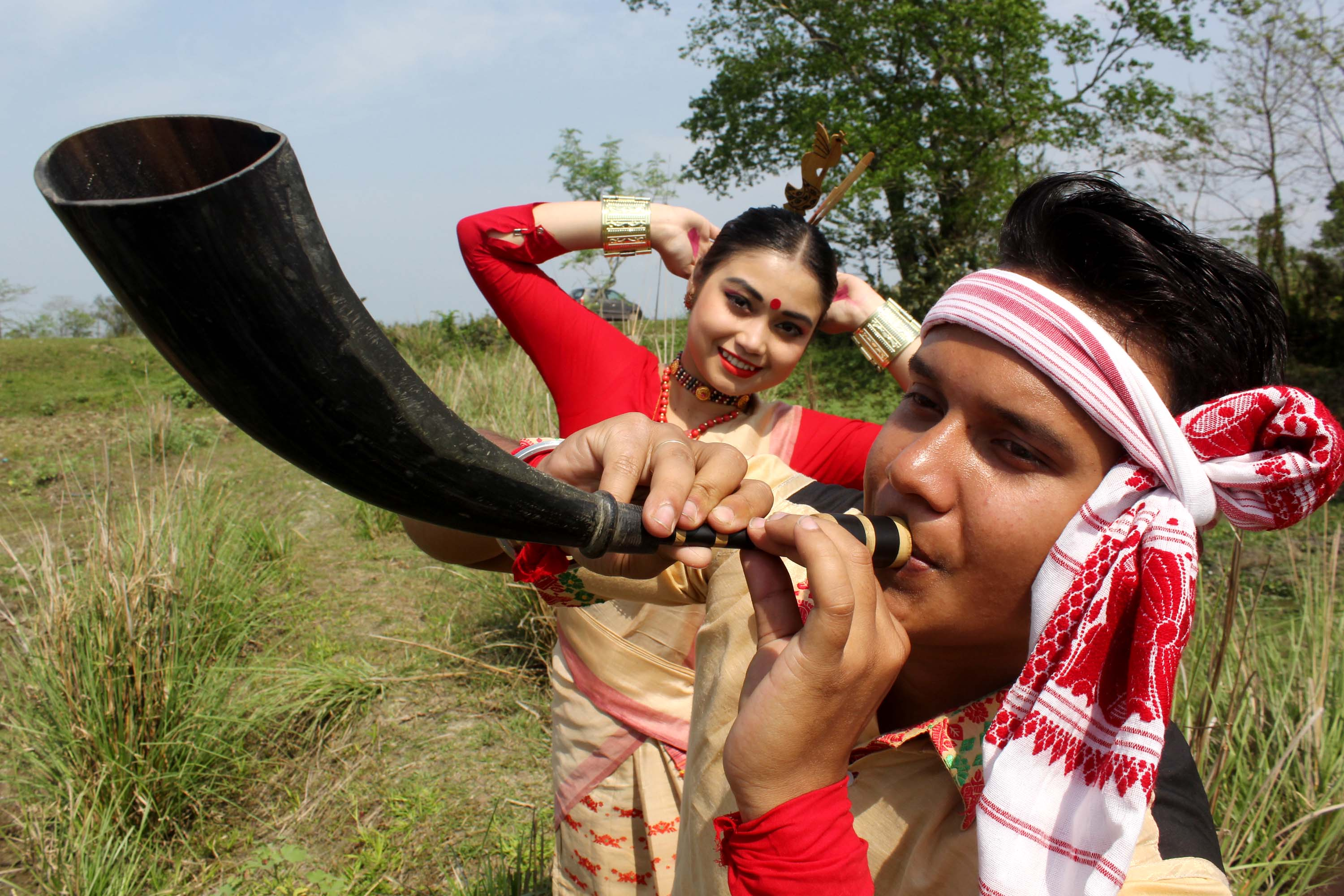
The pepa, an Assamese hornpipe

The hornpipe can refer to a specific instrument or a class of woodwind instruments consisting of a single reed, a large diameter melody pipe with finger holes and a bell traditionally made from animal horn. Additionally, a reed cap of animal horn may be placed around the reed to contain the breath and allow circular breathing for constant play, although in many cases the reed is placed directly in the mouth. It was also known as the pibcorn, pibgorn, or piccorn. One rare Scottish example, called the stock-and-horn, is referred to by Robert Burns among others. Other hornpipes include the Spanish gaita gastoreña, the Basque alboka and the Eastern European zhaleika. When joined with a bag, Baines refers to the instruments as "bag-hornpipes".

== Construction ==
The traditional hornpipe has one or two narrow internal bores between 4 mm and 12 mm each, with one or two idioglot single-reeds respectively, similar to the bagpipe drone reed, which is sometimes surrounded by a cap made of horn or wood which is sealed with the players lips. The melody pipe(s) can have between 5 (pentatonic) and 8 finger holes (one of which may be a thumb hole) giving a first register range of up to an octave plus a note. The bell is shaped from a section of horn, wood or sometimes rolled bark, and may have tuning holes or decorative work. This class of instrument comprises the ancient predecessors to modern cylindrically bored reed instruments, such as the clarinet.

== See also ==
- Shawm
