= Four Compositions (GTM) 2000 =

Studio album by Anthony Braxton
- Released: 2003
- Recorded: May 14, 2000
- Studio: Wesleyan University, Middletown, Connecticut
- Genre: Jazz
- Length: 69:27
- Label: Delmark; DG-544
- Producer: Robert G. Koester

Anthony Braxton chronology
10 [Solo Bagpipe] Compositions 2000 (2000)	Four Compositions (GTM) 2000 (2003)	Composition N. 247 (2001)

Four Compositions (GTM) 2000 is an album by composer/saxophonist Anthony Braxton recorded in 2000 and released in 2003 by the Delmark label.

== Reception ==
Professional ratings
Review scores
Source	Rating
AllMusic	3.5/5 stars
The Penguin Guide to Jazz Recordings	3/4 stars

AllMusic awarded the album 3½ stars with reviewer Alex Henderson stating "Four Compositions (GTM) 2000 has to be accepted own its own terms -- and those terms certainly aren't terms of the conservative "bop police." This is complex, abstract, dissonant, highly cerebral music that never goes out of its way to be accessible ... Four Compositions (GTM) 2000 won't be a pop hit, but those who are daring enough to go along for the ride will find that Braxton is in excellent form on four extended pieces (one of which lasts 20 minutes). This time, he plays several instruments (including flute and various saxophones) and leads a cohesive quartet ... Many non-avant-garde musicians have had difficulty comprehending Braxton's work, but these sideman obviously understand where he is coming from and serve him well on this inspired addition to his sizable catalog". On All About Jazz Jerry D'Souza noted "in the overall scheme of his musicianship he has elevated his concepts to a dazzling level. ... and it is all to the good that he has players who rise to the challenge brilliantly. What makes it all the more striking is that they saw only one composition in advance of the recording ... Braxton and his band come up with a soul stirring and mind jiggling experience". In JazzTimes, Aaron Steinberg wrote "these musicians sound confident and game despite some knotty structures. ... Braxton and the band range widely with these pieces, ending up sometimes at places of great subtlety and sensitivity".

== Track listing ==
1. "Composition 242" – 20:24
2. "Composition 243" – 13:40
3. "Composition 244" – 18:42
4. "Composition 245" – 16:26

== Personnel ==
- Anthony Braxton – B♭ soprano saxophone, E♭ sopranino saxophone, alto saxophone, F alto saxophone, baritone saxophone, bass saxophone, contrabass saxophone, flute
- Kevin Uehlinger – piano, melodica
- Keith Witty – double bass
- Noam Schatz – percussion
