= Tubax =

Musical instrument derived from the contrabass saxophone

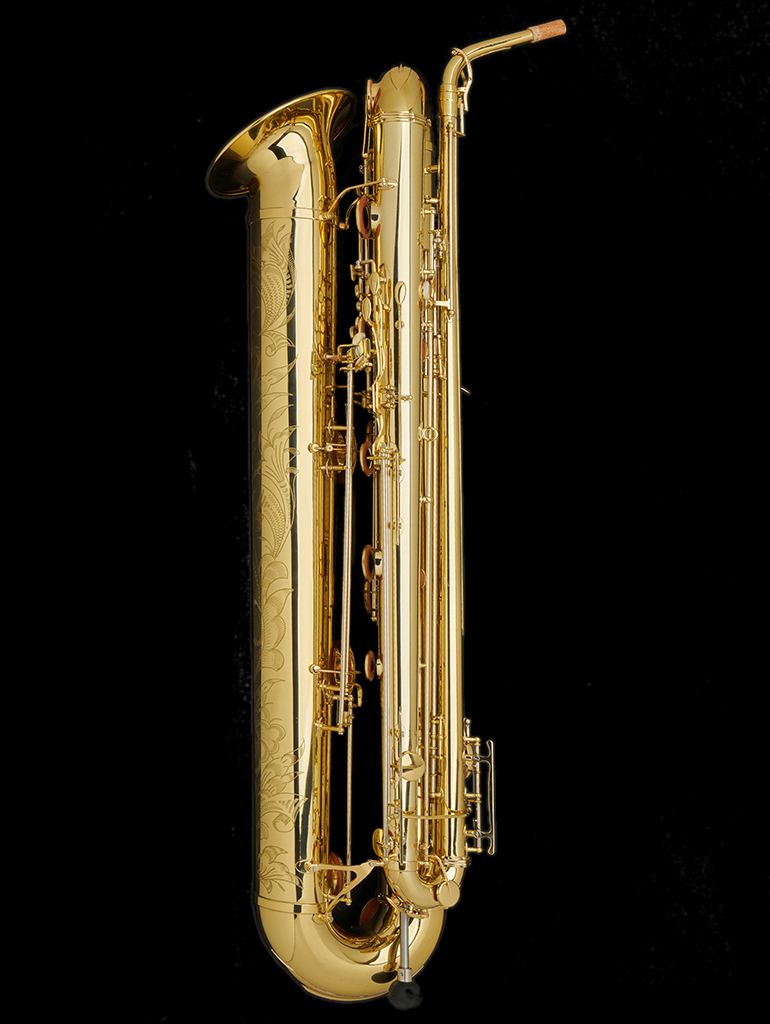
- Eppelsheim E♭ tubax

Woodwind instrument
- Classification: Single-reed
- Hornbostel–Sachs classification: 422.212-71 (Single-reed aerophone with keys)
- Inventor: Benedikt Eppelsheim
- Developed: Derived from the contrabass saxophone in 1999

Playing range
- The tubax is a transposing instrument in treble clef; E♭ tubax sounds two octaves and a major sixth lower, to D♭_{1}; the B♭ tubax three octaves and a second lower, to A♭_{0}

Related instruments
- Sizes: Soprillo; sopranino; soprano; alto; tenor; baritone; bass; contrabass; subcontrabass; Orchestral saxophones: C soprano; mezzo-soprano; C melody; Specialty saxophones: Aulochrome; tubax

Musicians
- Paul Cohen; Dror Feiler; Blaise Garza; Vinny Golia; Mats Gustafsson; Pat Posey; Jarno Sarkula; Steffen Schorn; Jim Sheppard; Marcus Weiss

Builders
- Benedikt Eppelsheim

The tubax is a modified contrabass saxophone developed in 1999 by the German instrument maker Benedikt Eppelsheim. Eppelsheim's design uses the same fingering as the saxophone while reducing the amount of expansion of its conical bore in relation to the length of tubing. This design modification results in a smaller volume of resonant air column, allowing the use of a smaller mouthpiece (baritone or bass size, instead of a larger contrabass mouthpiece), and more compactly folded tubing. The tubax exists in E♭ contrabass and B♭ or C subcontrabass sizes. Its name is a blend of the words "tuba" and "sax".

== History ==
Eppelsheim's first conception of the tubax came in 1992 or 1993 while working at the Bavarian instrument maker Münchner Blech. Prior to this time, while working in Franz Traut's workshop in Munich, he had spent much time experimenting with bocals and repairing saxophones, and built two experimental instruments. At Münchner Blech, he was able to work on contrabass and bass saxophones, as well as sarrusophones. Noting that there were no contrabass saxophones in modern production, he had the idea to build one in a shape reminiscent of the sarrusophone, or the saxophone bourdon per Adolphe Sax's original patent drawing.

The process from idea to production took around seven years. The initial design took around a week, followed by four weeks of building a prototype. Most of the time was spent calculating the scale length and tone hole positions, based on principles described in Cornelis Johannes Nederveen's Acoustical Aspects of Woodwind Instruments and Arthur H. Benade's Fundamentals of Musical Acoustics.

The first size of tubax to be developed was the E♭ (contrabass) tubax, introduced at the Musikmesse Frankfurt in 1999 and intended as a more practical alternative to the contrabass saxophone. The larger B♭ (subcontrabass) tubax appeared soon after and is equivalent to the subcontrabass saxophone, which, although envisioned as the saxophone bourdon by Adolphe Sax in his 1846 patent, was only first built in 2010 by the Brazilian manufacturer J'Élle Stainer. The subcontrabass tubax is also available in C.

== Construction ==
The E♭ and B♭ tubax have the same lengths of tubing as the contrabass and subcontrabass saxophones, respectively, but are much more compact. They are built with a narrower conical bore, somewhere between a regular saxophone and a contrabass sarrusophone, and use comparatively smaller baritone or bass saxophone mouthpieces. While saxophones are folded a maximum of three times, rendering saxophones larger than the baritone tall and unwieldy, the tubax is folded four times, to stand only 114 centimetres (3 ft 9 in) high for the E♭ tubax, not much taller than a baritone saxophone, yet an octave lower. Similarly, the B♭ tubax stands 145 centimetres (4 ft 9 in) tall, nearly half of the enormous 2.74-metre (9 ft 0 in) height of an equivalent subcontrabass saxophone. Despite this, the tubax retains identical fingering to a standard saxophone, including an altissimo F♯ key. This required completely redesigned keywork, which also brings the hands to a more comfortable position. The smaller size and more accessible key placements result in more portable and ergonomic instruments. The tubax also has a more focused and compact timbre than that of the full-sized saxophones.

== Repertoire and performance ==
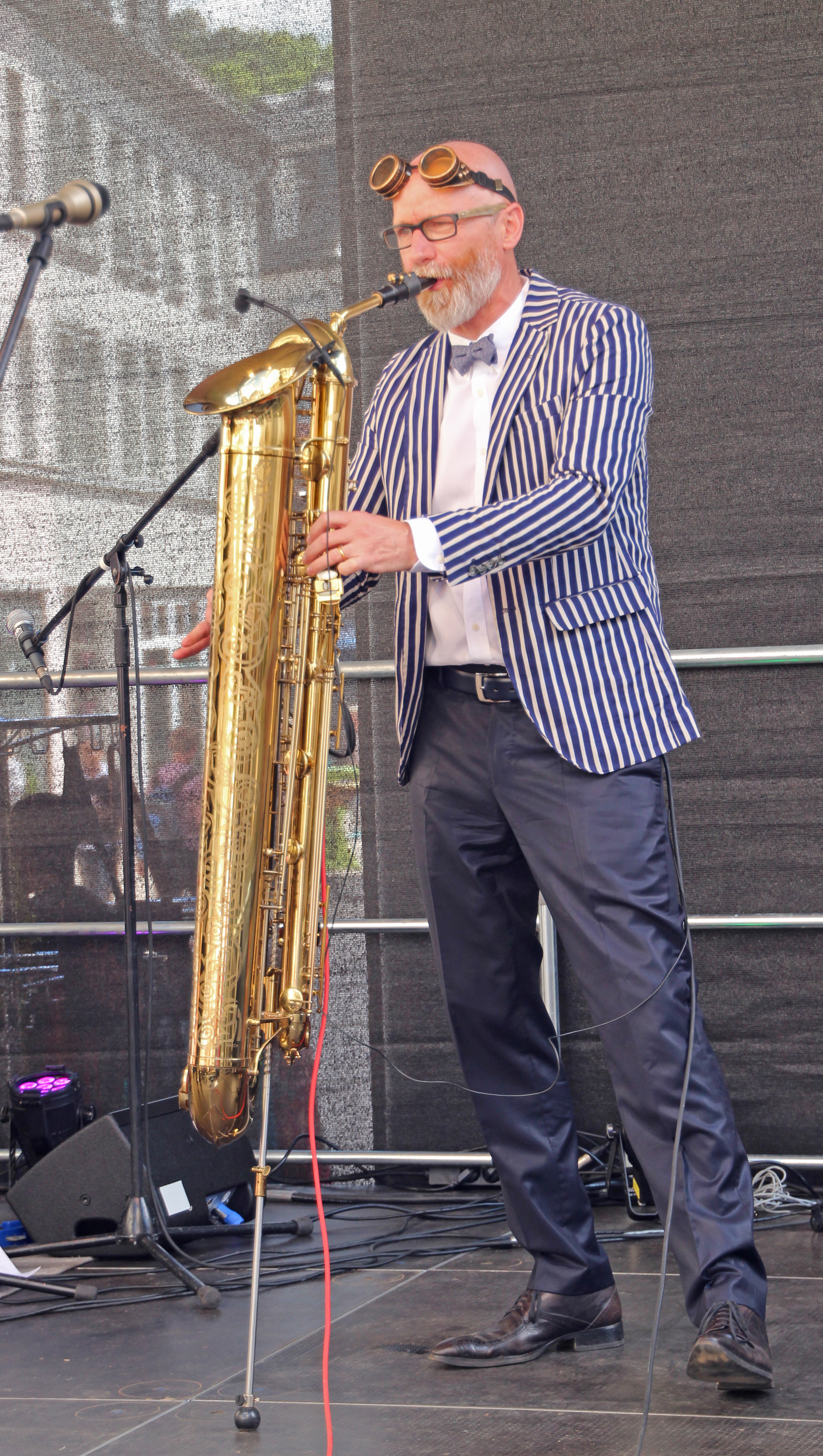
Oliver Saar performing on an E♭ tubax at Jazztage Idar-Oberstein in 2017

Given its short history and rarity, little has been specifically written for the tubax, but it can readily be used for any material intended for bass or contrabass saxophone. The tubax, like the saxophone, is a transposing instrument notated in treble clef. The E♭ and B♭ models have identical ranges to the contrabass and subcontrabass saxophones, respectively. Built without the low A key found on some low saxophones, the lowest note of the E♭ tubax is thus D♭_{1}, an octave below the lowest note of the baritone saxophone. The lowest note of the B♭ tubax is A♭_{0}, a semitone below the lowest note on the piano keyboard (A_{0}).

=== Notable performers ===
- Paul Cohen
- Dror Feiler
- Blaise Garza
- Vinny Golia
- Mats Gustafsson
- Pat Posey
- Jarno Sarkula
- Steffen Schorn
- Jim Sheppard
- Colin Stetson
- Marcus Weiss

=== Repertoire ===
- Chaya Czernowin, Maim (2001–2007) – for orchestra, quintet of soloists (tubax as pre-recorded main soloist), and electronics
