= Contrabass saxophone =

Low-pitched instrument in the saxophone family

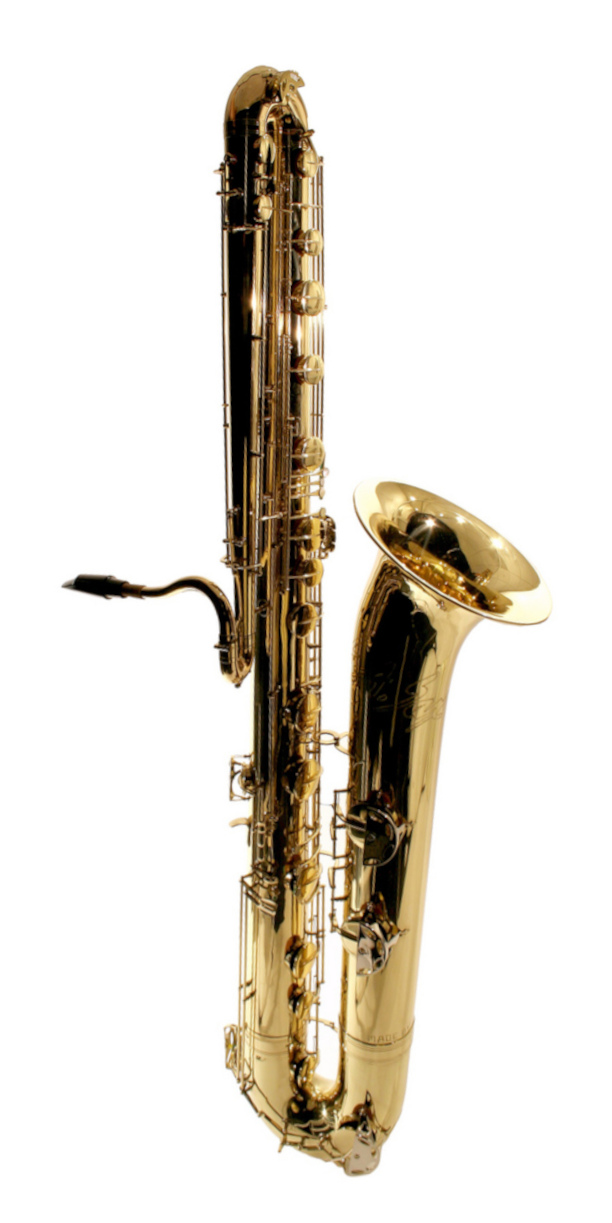
- Orsi contrabass saxophone (1999)

Woodwind instrument
- Classification: Single-reed
- Hornbostel–Sachs classification: 422.212-71 (Single-reed aerophone with keys)
- Inventor: Adolphe Sax
- Developed: 1840s

Playing range
- The contrabass saxophone in E♭ sounds two octaves and a major sixth lower than written. All current models sold extend from a low A to a high F♯.

Related instruments
- Sizes: Soprillo; Sopranino; Soprano; Alto; Tenor; Baritone; Bass; Contrabass; Subcontrabass; Orchestral saxophones: C soprano; Mezzo-soprano; C melody; Specialty saxophones: Aulochrome; Tubax

Musicians
- See list of saxophonists

Builders
- Benedikt Eppelsheim; J'Élle Stainer; Historical: Evette & Schaeffer (c. 1900–1930); Orsi (c. 1990–2010)

The contrabass saxophone is the third-lowest-pitched extant member of the saxophone family. It is pitched in E♭, one octave below the baritone saxophone, which requires twice the length of tubing and bore width. This renders a very large and heavy instrument, standing approximately 2 metres (6 ft 7 in) tall and weighing around 20 kilograms (44 lb). Despite this, it was used in marching bands in the early 20th century.

== History ==
The contrabass saxophone was part of the original saxophone family as conceived by Adolphe Sax, and it is included in his saxophone patent of 1846, as well as in Kastner's concurrently published Méthode for saxophone. By 1849, Sax was displaying contrabass through sopranino saxophones at exhibitions. Patrick Gilmore's famous American band roster included a contrabass saxophone in 1892, and at least two dozen of these instruments were built by the Evette & Schaeffer company for US military bands in the early 20th century, which, despite their size, were able to be played while marching using a strap. Saxophone ensembles were also popular at this time, and the contrabass saxophone was an eye-catching novelty for the groups that were able to obtain one. By the onset of the Great Depression, the saxophone craze had ended, and the contrabass, already rare, almost disappeared from public view.

In the early 2000s, the bass and contrabass saxophones experienced a renewed interest, particularly in large saxophone ensembles and community-based musical traditions. In Brazil, ethnomusicologists and museum scholars have documented the sustained use of low-register saxophones—including contrabass and subcontrabass saxophones—within large church orchestras associated with Pentecostal denominations such as the Christian Congregation in Brazil. These instruments are employed as functional bass voices, frequently reinforcing baritone or bass parts at lower octaves in order to support large congregational ensembles.

The practical demand created by these ensembles has contributed to the continued construction of extended-range instruments in Brazil, including subcontrabass saxophones, which extend below the traditional contrabass register. While rare in most classical and popular music settings, such instruments have found regular application within Brazilian religious orchestras, where their slow-vibrating fundamental tones function similarly to pedal registers in pipe organs.

== Construction ==
The saxophones in Sax's 1846 patent are only folded a maximum of three times, which necessarily requires the lower saxophones (from the baritone, downwards) to be progressively taller. The contrabass saxophone follows this pattern, bending upwards at the mouthpiece neck, then bending 180° at the top, and 180° again at the base of the instrument in order to orient the bell upwards and outwards. With a tubing length of nearly 4.9 metres (16 ft), the contrabass is approximately 2 metres (6 ft 7 in) tall. The tubax, developed by German instrument maker Benedikt Eppelsheim in the late 1990s, is a modern solution to this unwieldiness which adds a fourth bend, similar to the layout of a contrabass sarrusophone. This allows the E♭ tubax to cover the same range as the contrabass saxophone, yet stand only 114 centimetres (3 ft 9 in) high, comparable to the baritone saxophone. Brazilian saxophone makers have also designed compact contrabasses for use in churches, such as J'Élle Stainer's Stainerfone.

Although still rare and expensive, at least two manufacturers still produce contrabass saxophones: the German Benedikt Eppelsheim and Brazilian J'Élle Stainer.

== Repertoire and performance ==
Due to its large body and wide bore, the sound of the contrabass saxophone has great acoustical presence and a very rich tone. It can be smooth and mellow, or harsh and buzzy depending on the player, and on the mouthpiece and reed combination used. Its middle and upper registers are warm, full, and expressive. Because its deepest tones vibrate so slowly (as with the contrabassoon or pedal notes on a pipe organ) it can be difficult for listeners to perceive individual pitches at the bottom of its range; instead of hearing a clearly delineated melody, listeners may instead hear a series of rattling tones with little pitch definition. However, when these tones are reinforced by another instrument playing at the octave or fifteenth, they sound clearly defined and have tremendous resonance and presence. In some contemporary jazz/classical ensembles the contrabass saxophone doubles the baritone saxophone either at the same pitch or an octave below, depending on the register of the music.

=== In classical music ===
While there are few orchestral works that call specifically for the contrabass saxophone, the growing number of contrabass saxophonists has led to the creation of an increasing body of solo and chamber music literature. It is particularly effective as a foundation for large ensembles of saxophones. As an example, the eminent saxophonist Sigurd Raschèr (1907–2001) played the instrument in his Raschèr Saxophone Ensemble, and it is featured on most of the albums by the Nuclear Whales Saxophone Orchestra. Spanish composer Luis De Pablo wrote Une Couleur in 1988 for a single performer playing six saxophones, including contrabass and sopranino. The Scottish composer Alistair Hinton has included parts for soprano, alto, baritone, and contrabass saxophones in his Concerto for 22 Instruments, completed in 2005.

=== In rock and jazz music ===
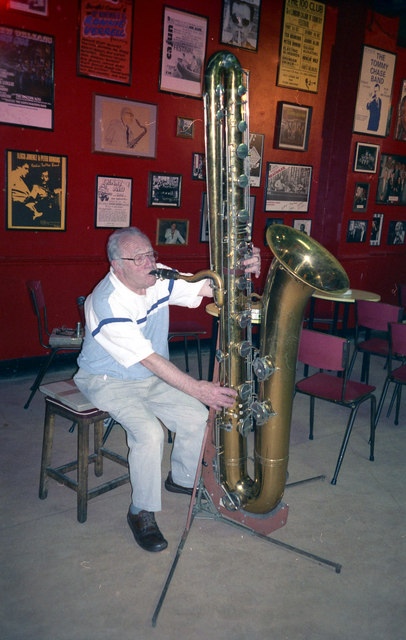
Harry Gold playing a contrabass saxophone; London, 1996

Since 2004, the rock group Violent Femmes have incorporated the contrabass saxophone into the band's live performances as well as their newest albums. Blaise Garza's contrabass saxophone often plays in unison with the bass guitar and is featured heavily on their ninth studio album, We Can Do Anything.

American multi-instrumentalist Anthony Braxton has used contrabass saxophone in jazz and improvised music. He can be heard playing the instrument on the albums The Aggregate (1988), Dortmund (Quartet) 1976 (first released in 1991), and Four Compositions (GTM) 2000 (released 2003).

== Performers ==
The contrabass saxophone has most frequently been used as a solo instrument by woodwind players in the genres of jazz and improvised music who are searching for an extreme or otherworldly tone. The difficulty of holding and controlling the instrument (let alone playing it) makes performing on the instrument a somewhat theatrical experience in and of itself. On older instruments, playing is difficult too; it takes an enormous amount of air to sound notes in the low register. Thanks to refinements in their acoustical designs and keywork, modern contrabass saxophones are no more difficult to play than most other saxophones.

An increasing number of performers and recording artists are making use of the instrument, including Anthony Braxton, Paul Cohen, David Brutti, Jay C. Easton, Randy Emerick, Blaise Garza, Marcel W. Helland, Robert J. Verdi, Joseph Donald Baker, Thomas K. J. Mejer, Douglas Pipher, Scott Robinson, Klaas Hekman, Daniel Gordon, Daniel Kientzy, and Todd A. White. It is also used by saxophone ensembles including the Raschèr Saxophone Orchestra, Saxophone Sinfonia, National Saxophone Choir of Great Britain, Zurich Saxophone Collective, Northstar Saxophone Quartet, Koelner Saxophone Mafia, Toronto-based Allsax4tet, and the Nuclear Whales Saxophone Orchestra.

== Bibliography ==
- Cottrell, Stephen (2012), The Saxophone, Yale Musical Instrument Series, New Haven, OL 16705370W, Wikidata Q113952716
