= Sopranino saxophone =

Second-smallest member of the saxophone family

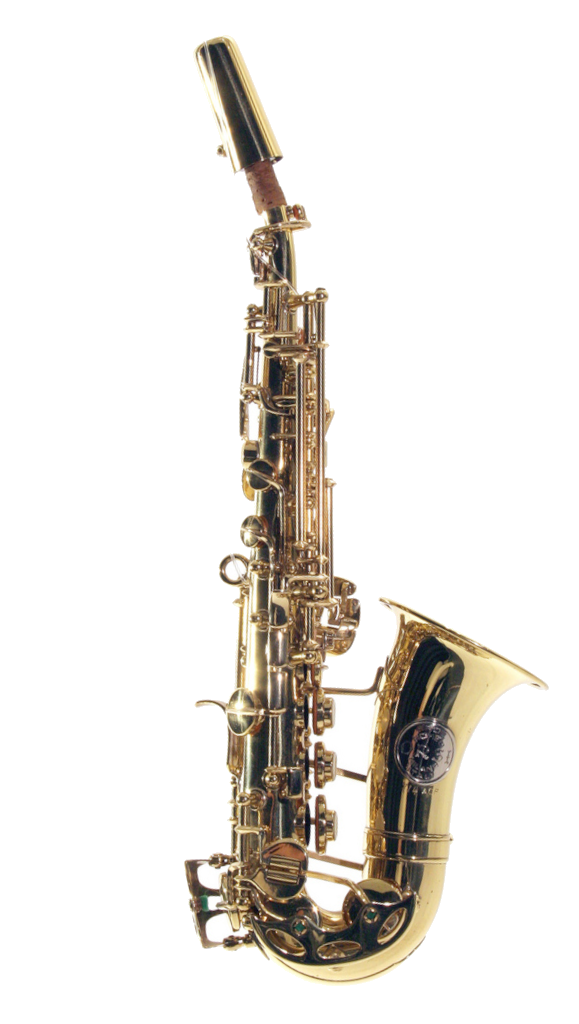
- Orsi curved sopranino saxophone, c. 2000

Woodwind instrument
- Classification: Single-reed
- Hornbostel–Sachs classification: 422.212-71 (Single-reed aerophone with keys)
- Inventor: Adolphe Sax
- Developed: 1840s

Playing range
- The sopranino saxophone in E♭ sounds a minor third higher than written. Some models may have a high F♯ key.

Related instruments
- Sizes: Soprillo; sopranino; soprano; alto; tenor; baritone; bass; contrabass; subcontrabass; Orchestral saxophones: C soprano; mezzo-soprano; C melody; Specialty saxophones: Aulochrome; tubax

Musicians
- See list of saxophonists

Builders
- Jinbao; Orsi; Rampone & Cazzani; Selmer; Wessex; Yanagisawa

The sopranino saxophone is the second-smallest member of the saxophone family. It is pitched in the key of E♭ and sounds an octave higher than the alto saxophone. A sopranino in F was also described in Adolphe Sax's patent, an octave above an F alto (mezzo-soprano), but there are no known built instruments.

The sopranino saxophone has a sweet sound, and, although it is one of the least common of the saxophones in regular use today, it is still being produced by the saxophone manufacturers Orsi and Rampone & Cazzani in Italy, Henri Selmer Paris, Yanagisawa in Japan, and Chinese makers Jinbao and Wessex. Due to their small size, sopraninos are usually built straight like a clarinet, although Orsi makes both straight and curved models, with the appearance of a miniature alto.

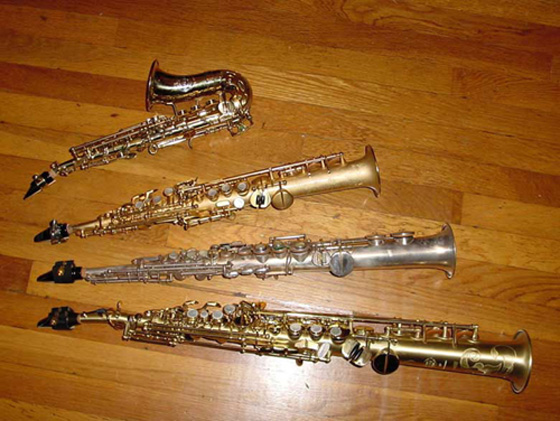
Top to bottom: curved E♭ sopranino, straight E♭ sopranino, C soprano, and B♭ soprano saxophones

The original patented saxophone family, as developed by Adolphe Sax, included E♭ and B♭ saxophones in the voices of sopranino, soprano, alto, tenor, baritone, bass, contrabass, and subcontrabass, and the same seven in the keys of C and F (though only the C soprano, F alto, and C tenor were ever made). In the late 1990s, the soprillo, an even smaller, piccolo, saxophone pitched in B♭, a fifth above the sopranino, was developed by the German instrument maker Benedikt Eppelsheim.

The sopranino saxophone is a transposing instrument with the same written range as any saxophone, from B♭_{3} to at least F_{6}. Sounding a minor third higher than written, like an E♭ clarinet or soprano cornet, this range corresponds to D♭_{4} to A♭_{6} in concert pitch.

== Repertoire ==
Boléro sopranino solo
Orchestre national de l'ORTF recording of Maurice Ravel's Boléro. Sopranino saxophone solo begins at 5m 47s

In classical music, the most notable use of the sopranino saxophone is in the French composer Maurice Ravel's orchestral work Boléro (1929). Ravel's score calls for sopranino en Fa, but it is unlikely that a sopranino has ever been built in F; the part is usually performed on an E♭ sopranino or B♭ soprano.

The instrument has seen a small revival contemporary music in the 21st century. The American rock band Violent Femmes has incorporated a horn section, "Horns of Dilemma", into their live performances and albums, including many sizes of saxophone from sopranino to contrabass. Saxophonist Blaise Garza plays a sopranino in the Violent Femmes's 2019 song "I'm Not Gonna Cry".

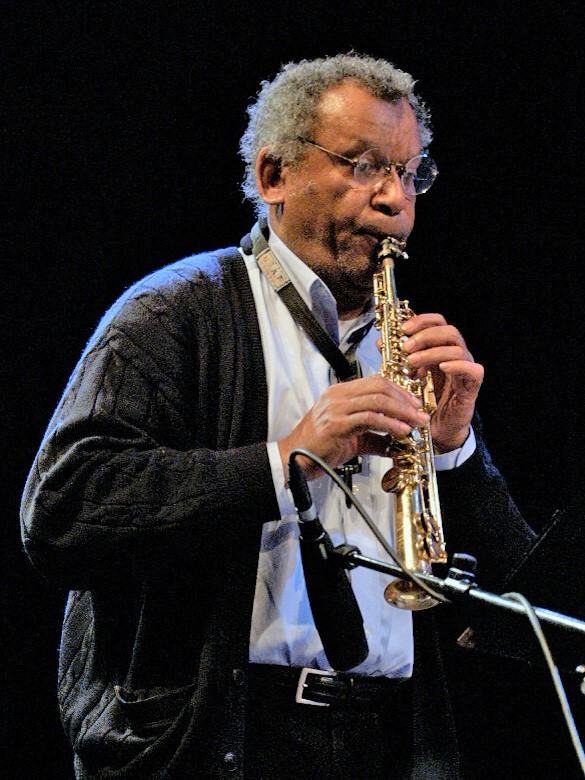
Anthony Braxton playing a sopranino saxophone in 2007

Outside of classical and rock music, notable jazz and improvising musicians using this instrument include Carla Marciano, James Carter, Anthony Braxton, La Monte Young, Roscoe Mitchell, Christophe Monniot, Joseph Jarman, Paul McCandless, Lol Coxhill, Roger Frampton, Hans Koller, Wolfgang Fuchs, Douglas Ewart, Larry Ochs, Vinny Golia, Thomas Chapin, Martin Archer, David Sanborn, Jon Irabagon, Massimo Falascone, Alejandro Arturi, Gianni Gebbia, and Ian Anderson (credited with having played the instrument on the Jethro Tull albums A Passion Play and War Child). The sopranino saxophone was also used in the six-member Nuclear Whales Saxophone Orchestra, played by Kelley Hart Jenkins.

== Bibliography ==
- Cottrell, Stephen (2012), The Saxophone, Yale Musical Instrument Series, New Haven, OL 16705370W, Wikidata Q113952716
