= Bass saxophone =

Wind instrument

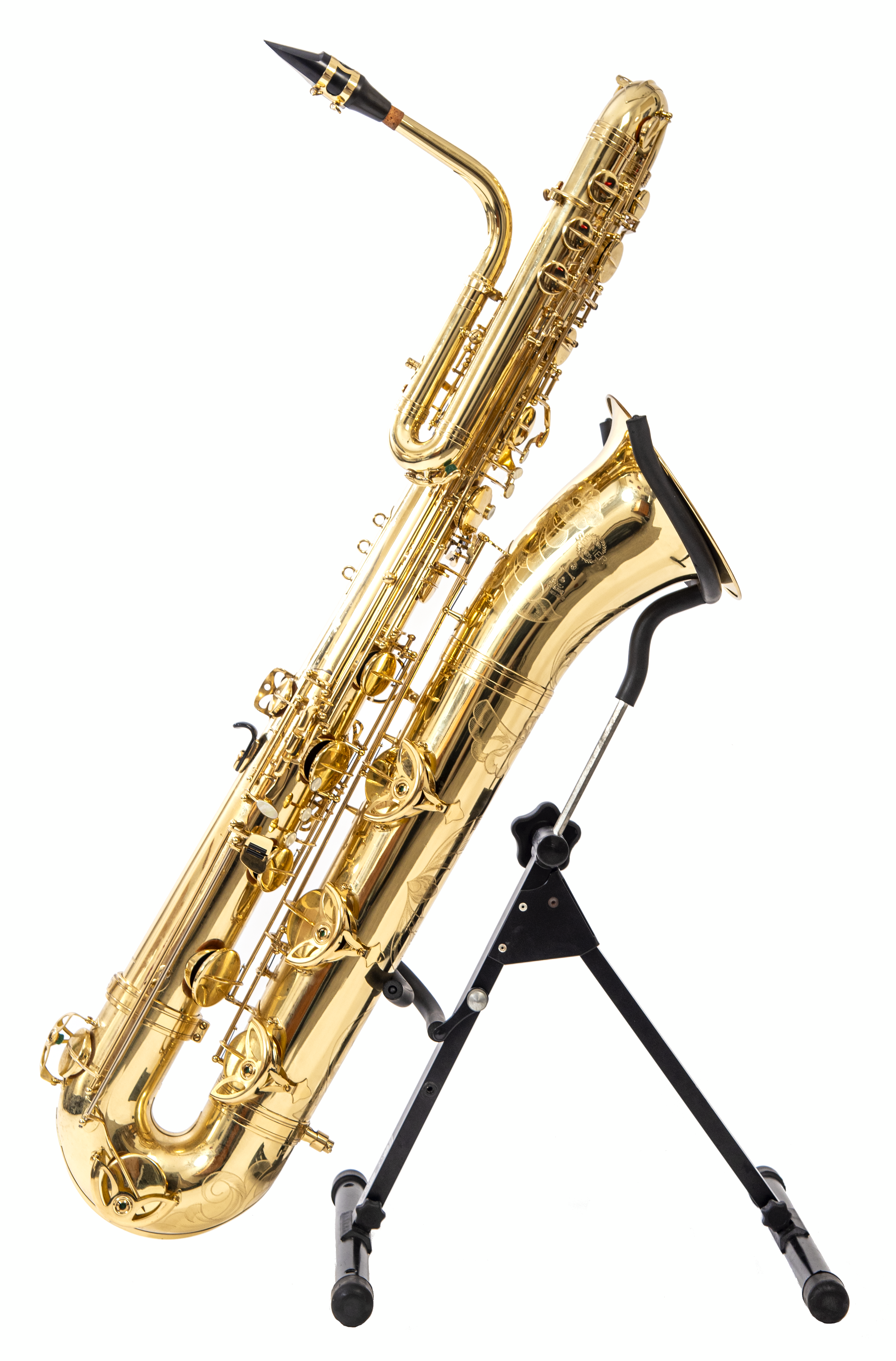
- Selmer bass saxophone, on a stand, c. 2020s

Woodwind instrument
- Classification: Single-reed
- Hornbostel–Sachs classification: 422.212-71 (Single-reed aerophone with keys)
- Inventor: Adolphe Sax
- Developed: 1840s

Playing range
- The bass saxophone in B♭ sounds two octaves and a major second lower than written. Most modern models are equipped with a high F♯ key.

Related instruments
- Sizes: Soprillo; sopranino; soprano; alto; tenor; baritone; bass; contrabass; subcontrabass; Orchestral saxophones: C soprano; mezzo-soprano; C melody; Specialty saxophones: Aulochrome; tubax

Musicians
- See list of saxophonists

Builders
- Benedikt Eppelsheim; J'Élle Stainer; Jinbao; Keilwerth; Orsi (on request); Selmer; Treepur

The bass saxophone is the fourth-lowest member of the saxophone family – larger and lower than the more common baritone saxophone. It was likely the first type of saxophone built by Adolphe Sax, as first observed by Hector Berlioz in 1842. It is a transposing instrument pitched in B♭, an octave below the tenor saxophone and a perfect fourth below the baritone saxophone. A bass saxophone in C, intended for orchestral use, was included in Adolphe Sax's patent, but few known examples were built. The bass saxophone is not a commonly used instrument, but it is heard on some 1920s jazz recordings, in free jazz, in saxophone choirs and sextets, and occasionally in concert bands and rock music.

Music for all saxophones is written in treble clef, the bass saxophone sounding two octaves and a major second lower than written. As with other saxophones, the lowest written note is the B♭ below middle C, sounding as a concert A♭_{1}, although some models have an extra key for low A (sounding G_{1}).

== Construction ==
The bass saxophone was one of only two working prototypes completed before Sax's 1846 patent, the other being an "E♭ tenor" (now the baritone). It was intended to replace the ophicleide, from which it was derived, and had a similar upright form. The bass was later revised by Sax into its current S-shaped form, first appearing in an 1850 sales brochure.

The German wind instrument maker Benedikt Eppelsheim and the Brazilian saxophone maker J'Élle Stainer have both made bass saxophones with an additional low A key, similar to the low A key on the baritone saxophone. On the bass, this extends the range down a semitone to concert G_{1} (~49 Hz). Most basses made before the 1980s were keyed to high E♭, but most new models are keyed to high F♯.

== In jazz ==
The bass saxophone enjoyed some popularity in jazz combos and dance bands between World War I and World War II, primarily providing bass line, although bass saxophonists occasionally took melodic solos. Notable players of this era include Billy Fowler, Coleman Hawkins, Otto Hardwick (of the Duke Ellington orchestra), Adrian Rollini (a pioneer of bass saxophone solos in the 1920s and '30s), Min Leibrook, Spencer Clark, Charlie Ventura, and Vern Brown of the Six Brown Brothers. Sheet music of the period shows many bands photographed with a bass saxophone, but in the 1930s, it's use virtually disappeared, possibly due to its size, mechanical complexity, and high price. The invention of the electric bass guitar in the 1950s and its quick rise to popularity reduced demand for other bass instruments in popular music and other contemporary music.

American bandleader Boyd Raeburn (1913–1966) led an avant-garde big band in the 1940s and sometimes played the bass saxophone. In Britain, Oscar Rabin played it in his own band. Harry Gold, a member of Rabin's band, played bass saxophone in his own band, Pieces of Eight. American bandleader Stan Kenton's Mellophonium Band (1960–1963) featured fourteen brass players and used a saxophone section of one alto, two tenors, baritone, and bass on many Grammy-winning compositions by Johnny Richards (with Joel Kaye doubling on baritone and bass saxophones). The Lawrence Welk Band featured Bill Page soloing on bass saxophone on several broadcasts during the 1960s. Shorty Rogers's The Swingin' Nutcracker (RCA Victor, 1960) featured a bass saxophone, played by Bill Hood, on four of the movements.

One notable bass saxophonist performing today in the 1920s–1930s style is Vince Giordano. Jazz musicians using the instrument in a more contemporary style include Roscoe Mitchell, Anthony Braxton, Peter Brötzmann, J. D. Parran, Hamiet Bluiett, James Carter, Stefan Zeniuk, Michael Marcus, Vinny Golia, Joseph Jarman, Brian Landrus, Urs Leimgruber, and Scott Robinson, although none of these players use it as their primary instrument.

Jan Garbarek plays a bass saxophone on the 1974 album Red Lanta.

== In rock ==
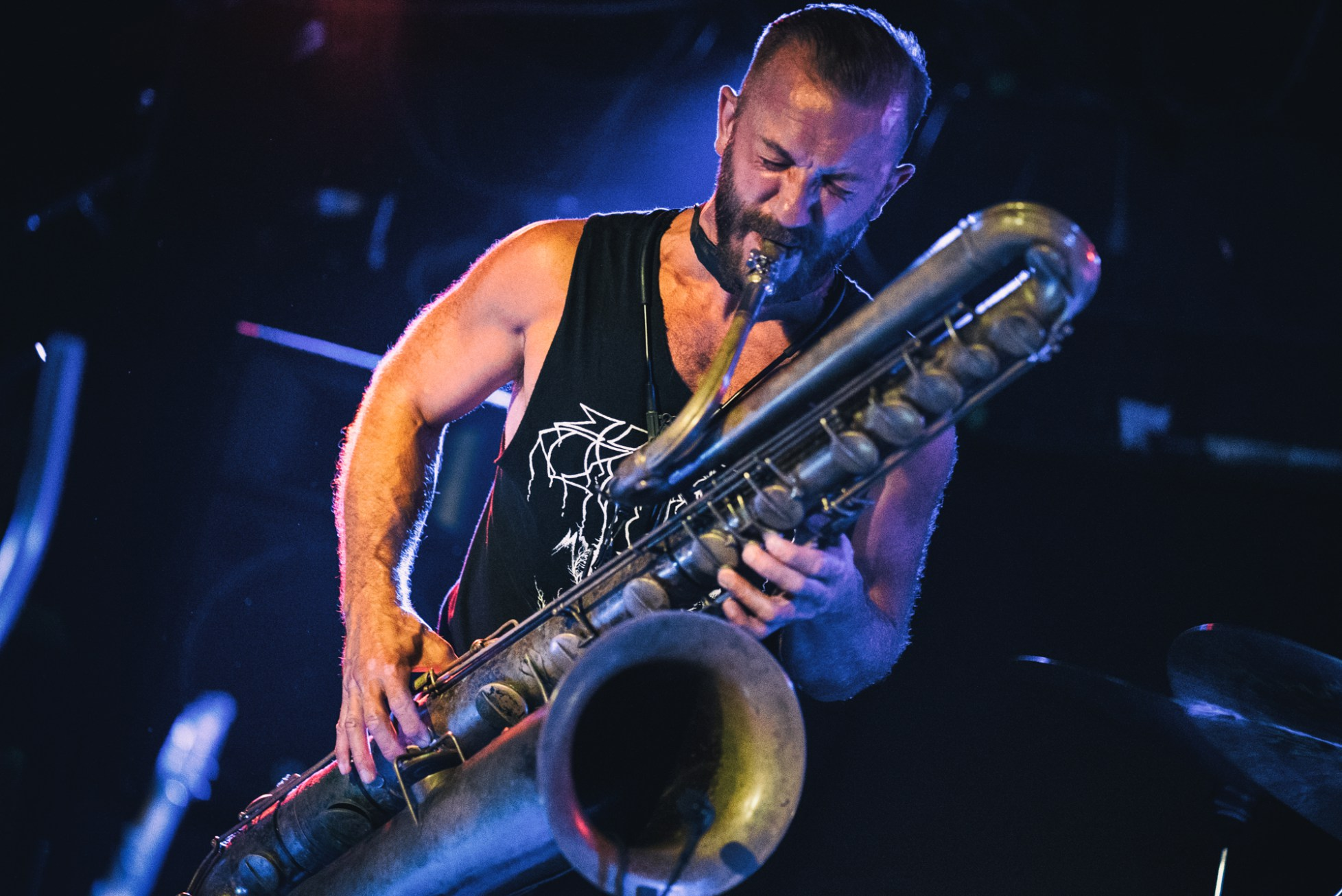
Colin Stetson playing a bass saxophone, 2017

Bass saxophonists in rock include:

- Angelo Moore of the American band Fishbone
- Rodney Slater in the Bonzo Dog Doo-Dah Band (1960s)
- Ralph Carney of the avant-garde rock band Tin Huey (1970s)
- John Linnell of They Might Be Giants (formed 1982)
- Dana Colley of Morphine (formed 1989)
- Kurt McGettrick in Frank Zappa's band in the late 1980s
- Alto Reed of Bob Seger and the Silver Bullet Band often played bass saxophone at live shows, in songs without a prominent saxophone part.
- Colin Stetson has performed and recorded with Arcade Fire, Bell Orchestre, Tom Waits, TV on the Radio, Bon Iver, Feist, and LCD Soundsystem. He also performs and records his own compositions.
- Blaise Garza, touring member of Violent Femmes since 2004
- Kellie Everett, member of The Hooten Hallers since 2014
- Michael Wilbur, member of Moon Hooch

== In classical music ==
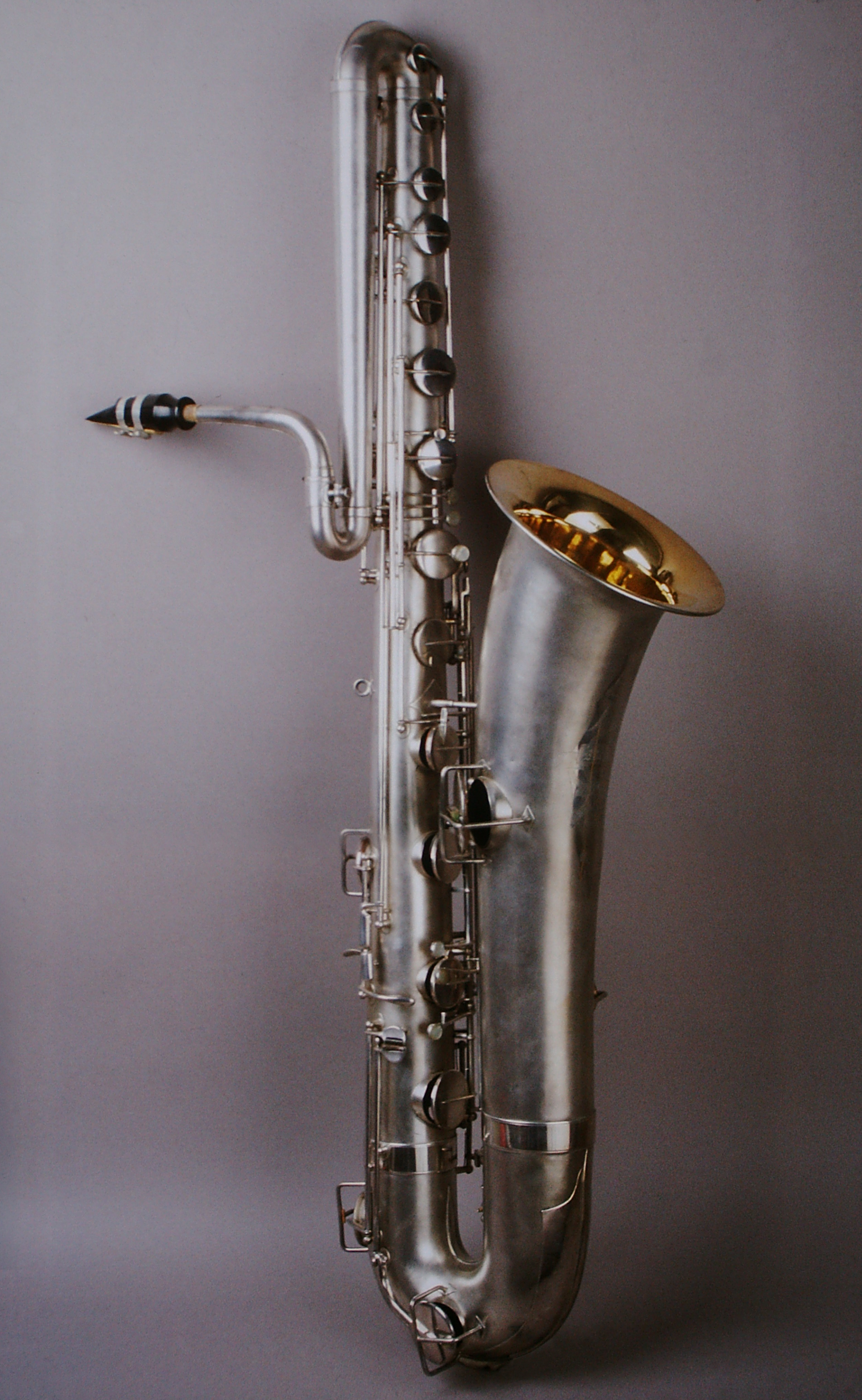
Bass saxophone made by the Elkhart Band Instrument Company, c. 1923–28

Hector Berlioz arranged Hymne (probably based on his Chant Sacré) for three saxhorns, clarinet, bass clarinet, and saxophone. This was performed in Adolphe Sax's workshop in February 1844 to demonstrate his instruments, and it is likely that Sax himself played the saxophone part on his ophicleide-shaped bass saxophone prototype. The same year, Georges Kastner wrote for a bass saxophone in C in his opera Le Dernier Roi de Juda, treating it like an ophicleide part with the brass.

It is rarely used in orchestral music, though several examples exist. The earliest extant orchestral work to employ it is William Henry Fry's "sacred symphony" Hagar in the Wilderness (1853), which also calls for soprano saxophone and was written for Louis-Antoine Jullien's orchestra during its American tour. Richard Strauss, in his Symphonia Domestica (1904), wrote four saxophone parts including one for bass saxophone in C. Arnold Schoenberg wrote for the bass saxophone in his one-act opera Von heute auf morgen (1929), and Karlheinz Stockhausen includes a part for it in the saxophone section of Lucifer's Dance, the third scene of his opera, Samstag aus Licht (1983).

In the 1950s and 1960s, it enjoyed a brief vogue in orchestrations for musical theatre. The orchestras for Sandy Wilson's The Boy Friend (1953) and Meredith Willson's The Music Man (1957) included bass saxophone, as did Leonard Bernstein's original score for the 1957 premiere of West Side Story.

The bass saxophone is occasionally called for in concert bands, typically in arrangements from before 1950. The Australian composer Percy Grainger and the American composer Warren Benson are particularly notable composers who wrote for it.

In chamber music, the bass saxophone can appear in saxophone ensembles, especially larger saxophone choirs. It is rarely used in small, mixed chamber groups, though it can be used to play parts intended for other instruments.

== Bibliography ==
- Cottrell, Stephen (2012), The Saxophone, Yale Musical Instrument Series, New Haven, OL 16705370W, Wikidata Q113952716
- Kendall, Bryan (2022). In Search of the Saxophone: its Origins and Functions. Hutchins: Kendallhouse Publishing. ISBN 979-8-218-07844-7. OCLC 1356801546. Wikidata Q133873478.
