= C soprano saxophone =

Musical instrument in the saxophone family

- Buescher True-Tone C soprano, c. 1922–23

Woodwind instrument
- Classification: Single-reed
- Hornbostel–Sachs classification: 422.212-71 (Single-reed aerophone with keys)
- Inventor: Adolphe Sax
- Developed: 1840s

Playing range
- C soprano saxophone sounds as written.

Related instruments
- Sizes: Soprillo; sopranino; soprano; alto; tenor; baritone; bass; contrabass; subcontrabass; Orchestral saxophones: C soprano; mezzo-soprano; C melody; Specialty saxophones: Aulochrome; tubax

Musicians
- See list of saxophonists

The C soprano saxophone is a member of the saxophone family, invented in 1846. It closely resembles the more common B♭ soprano saxophone but is pitched a major second (whole tone) higher. Unlike most other saxophones, it is not a transposing instrument, a quality it shares with the C melody saxophone (also called the C tenor saxophone). The C soprano has an identical range to the oboe.

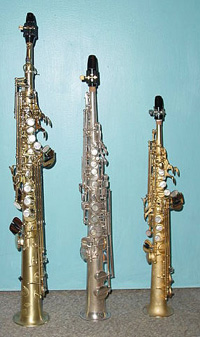
B♭ soprano saxophone (left), silver-plated C soprano saxophone (center), E♭ sopranino saxophone (right)

American production of C sopranos commenced at the Buescher Band Instrument Company in 1915 and generally ended in the late 1920s. The same companies that made C melody instruments manufactured C soprano saxophones, and they were marketed to those who wished to perform oboe parts in military bands, vaudeville arrangements, or church hymnals. C sopranos made by some French manufacturers exist but are exceedingly rare.

In the early 2010s, the New Zealand–based company Aquilasax contracted a factory in China to produce C sopranos, with modern keywork but a bore copied from C. G. Conn's 1920s model. These received a mildly positive response from players and technicians who encountered them, but demand was low and only a small number were produced. Aquilasax is now defunct, and the factory that produced these instruments is no longer operational.

C sopranos are the same shape as B♭ sopranos and differ in length by only around 3 centimetres (1.2 in). Nearly all vintage examples are keyed from low B♭ to high E♭. Aquilasax's 2010s models were keyed to high F and F♯. C soprano saxophones usually have a "C" stamped on them, near the serial number.

The range of the standard vintage horn from 1920–1928 is a concert/written B♭_{3} to E♭_{6}. The 2010 models are keyed from B♭_{3} to F_{6} or F♯_{6} (or G_{6} for models with a High-G key).

== In classical music ==
The C soprano saxophone was written for by Richard Strauss in his Symphonia Domestica, which included parts for four saxophones, including a soprano saxophone in C.
