= Aulochrome =

Woodwind instrument

Woodwind instrument
- Classification: Single-reed
- Hornbostel–Sachs classification: 422.212-71 (Single-reed aerophone with keys)
- Inventor: François Louis
- Developed: First prototype in 1999

Playing range

Related instruments
- Sizes: Soprillo; sopranino; soprano; alto; tenor; baritone; bass; contrabass; subcontrabass; Orchestral saxophones: C soprano; mezzo-soprano; C melody; Specialty saxophones: Aulochrome; tubax

Musicians
- Fabrizio Cassol; Joe Lovano

The aulochrome is a woodwind instrument invented by the Belgian instrument maker François Louis, first prototyped in 1999. It consists of two soprano saxophones that can be played either separately or together. The name comes from the Greek aulos (an important instrument in ancient Greek music) and chrome (for chromatic and colored). The first user of this instrument was saxophonist Fabrizio Cassol, and Joe Lovano has recently recorded with it as well. Composer Philippe Boesmans wrote a work for aulochrome and orchestra, Fanfare III, which was premiered in 2002 by Cassol and conductor Sylvain Cambreling.
