= C melody saxophone =

Woodwind instrument in the key of C

- Buescher True-Tone C melody, 1921

Woodwind instrument
- Classification: Single-reed
- Hornbostel–Sachs classification: 422.212-71 (Single-reed aerophone with keys)
- Inventor: Adolphe Sax
- Developed: 1840s

Playing range
- C melody saxophone sounds one octave lower than written.

Related instruments
- Sizes: Soprillo; sopranino; soprano; alto; tenor; baritone; bass; contrabass; subcontrabass; Orchestral saxophones: C soprano; mezzo-soprano; C melody; Specialty saxophones: Aulochrome; tubax

Musicians
- See list of saxophonists

The C melody saxophone, also known as the C tenor saxophone, is a saxophone pitched in the key of C, one whole tone above the common B-flat tenor saxophone. The C melody was part of the series of saxophones pitched in C and F intended by the instrument's inventor, Adolphe Sax, for orchestral use. It enjoyed popularity in the early 1900s, perhaps most prominently used by Rudy Wiedoeft and Frankie Trumbauer, but is now uncommon.

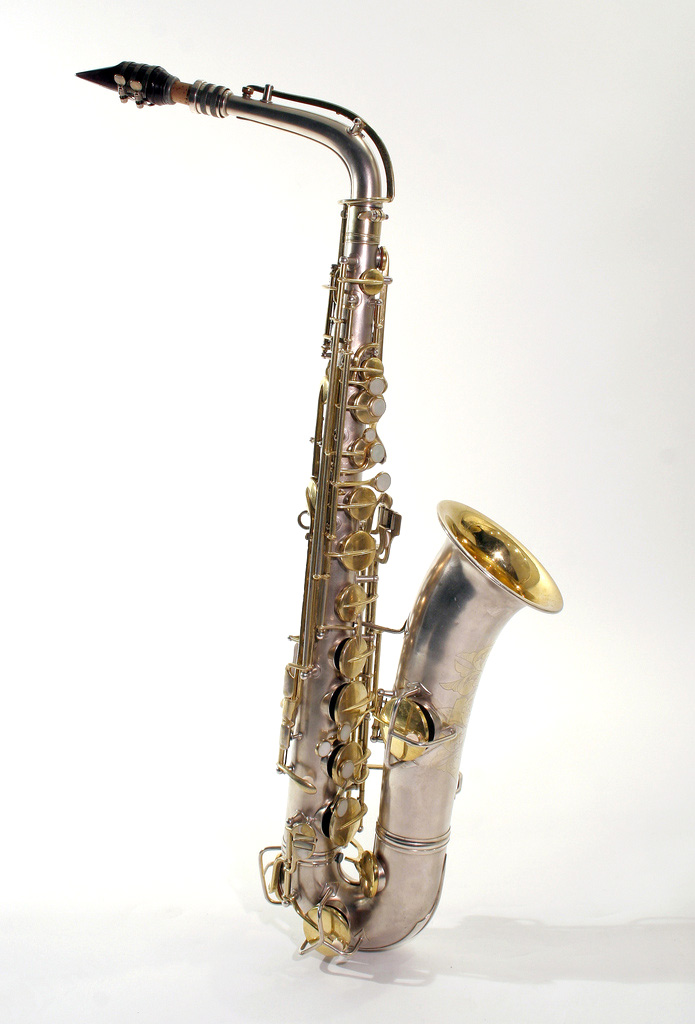
While most C melody saxophones have curved necks, C. G. Conn made straight-necked instruments, such as this 1921 New Wonder series 1.

A C melody saxophone is larger than an alto and smaller than a tenor. The bore on most models has a diameter and taper more like a 'stretched' alto than a tenor. When seen in profile, its shape bears some resemblance to a tenor saxophone, though it is smaller and the bell appears longer. Most C melody saxophones have curved necks (with a similar shape to that of the tenor saxophone), though C. G. Conn did make straight-necked C melody instruments (more similar to the alto). C melody saxophones are usually marked with a letter "C" above or below the serial number.

Since 1930, only saxophones in the key of B♭ and E♭ (originally intended by Sax for use in military bands and wind ensembles) have been produced on a large scale. However, in the early years of the 21st century, small-scale production of new C melody saxophones had commenced in China for a company called Aquilasax, though production ceased by 2015. Student-quality C melody instruments are, as of 2026, available from Thomann (Germany) and Sakkusu (UK).

== Advantages ==
A major selling point for the C melody saxophone was the fact that in contrast to other saxophones, it was not a transposing instrument, except at the octave. As a result, the player could read regular printed music (e.g. for flute, oboe, violin, piano, guitar, or voice) without having to transpose or read music parts that have been transposed into B♭ or E♭, which most other saxophones would require. This enabled amateur musicians to play along with a friend or family member by reading from the same sheet of music – so long as the music fell within the pitch range of the C melody saxophone itself, that is, was not too high or low. Another selling point was that the C melody produces a more muted tone than the E♭ alto or B♭ tenor, which was useful when playing at home. Many novelty tunes, most influenced by 1920s dance music, were written specifically for the instrument. They were sometimes also used in churches to accompany hymns. Saxophonists in Irish and Irish-American dance bands of the 1920s and '30s often used the C melody, as it made for easier fingering in the keys of G and D, commonly used for traditional Irish tunes played by fiddlers, flute players, and button accordionists. Similarly, some players prefer the C melody when playing guitar-based blues music in E or A.

== Mouthpieces ==
Dedicated mouthpieces were produced for the C melody saxophone, though these may be hard to find in the 21st century. The C melody has a muted sound when compared to other saxophone types, particularly if an original vintage mouthpiece is used. This made it particularly useful for its originally intended environment of playing in drawing rooms. C melody mouthpieces often give a C melody saxophone a slightly muffled sound, which may or may not be what the player desires. Some players successfully use a modern tenor saxophone mouthpiece, modified by cutting off one centimeter of the mouthpiece, if needed to fit, with their C melody saxophone, though depending on which mouthpiece type is chosen (e.g. long shank or short shank), there may be problems regarding the accuracy of intonation, particularly at the upper range. As a result, some experimentation may be required in order to find a tenor mouthpiece which provides accurate intonation across the entire scale. Other players have successfully fitted alto saxophone mouthpieces to their C melody saxophones. As before, some experimentation may be required. With a more modern mouthpiece fitted, a C melody saxophone can lose some of its muted qualities and sound brighter, with more of the sonic power that an alto or tenor saxophone gives. Currently, there are a number of manufacturers producing C melody mouthpieces, including Ralph Morgan and Ronald Caravan.

== Production history ==
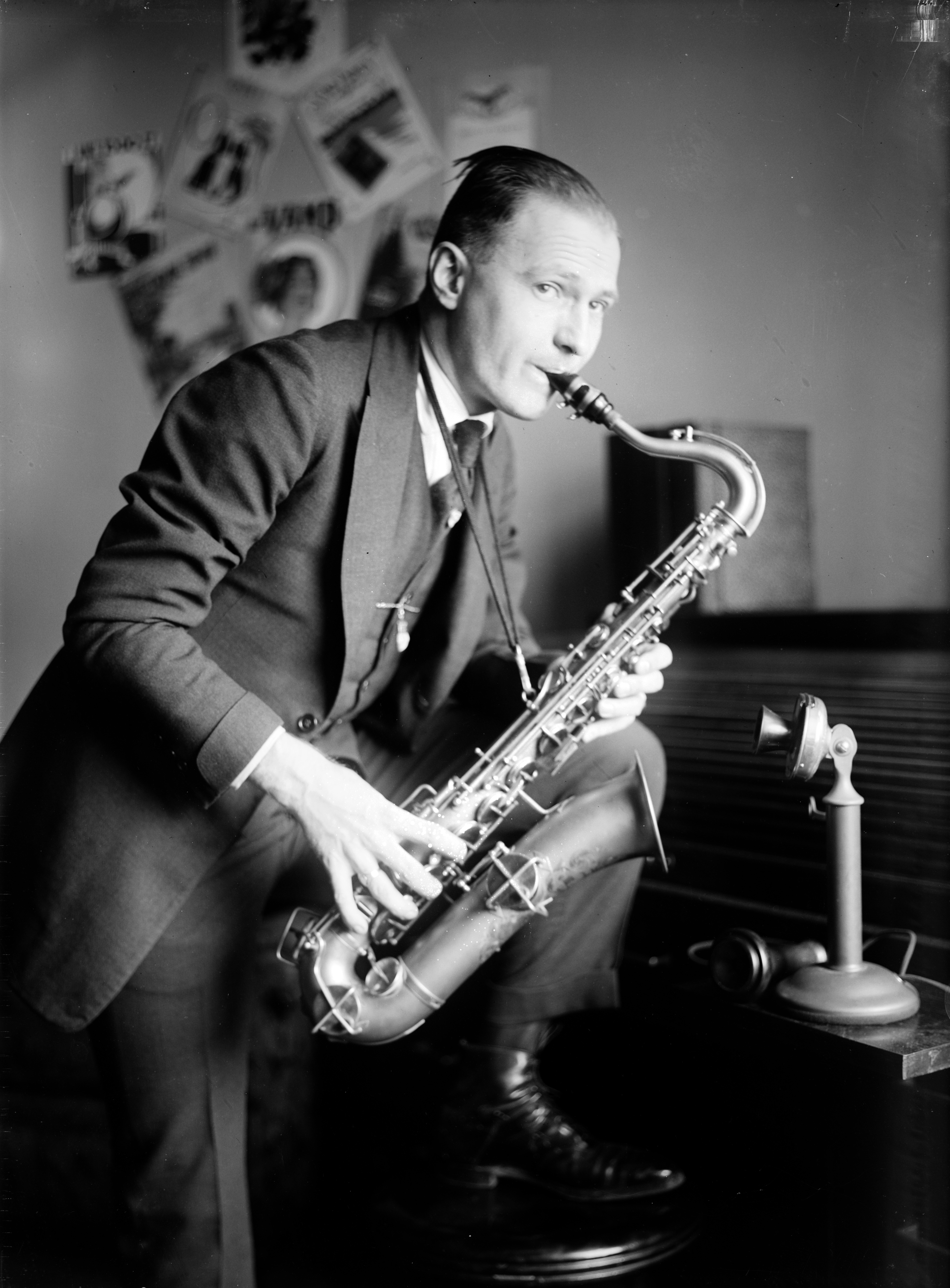
Rudy Wiedoeft playing a C melody saxophone, c. 1920

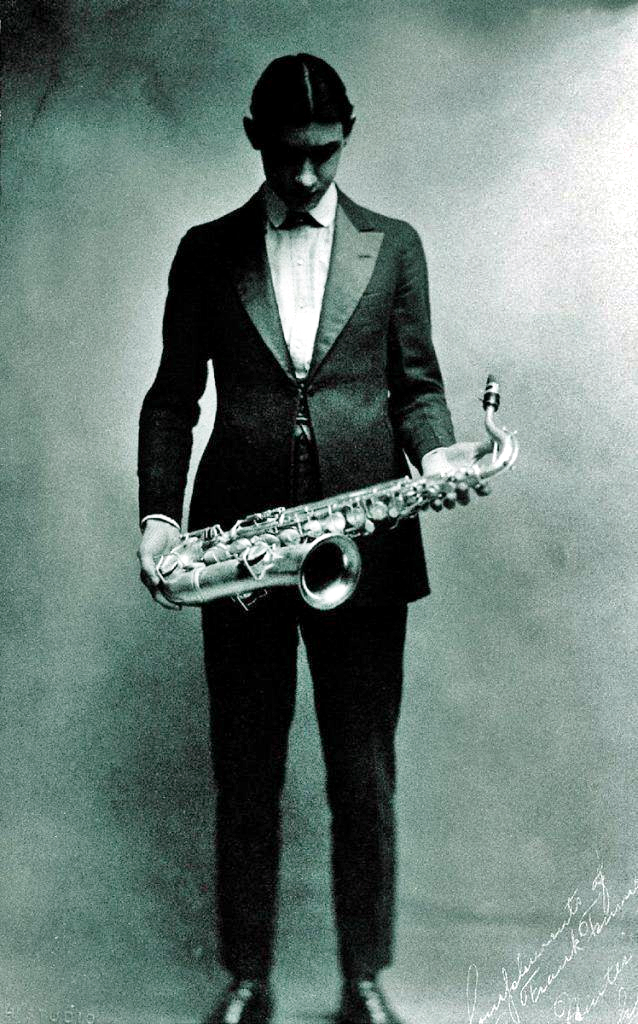
Frankie Trumbauer posing with his C melody saxophone, c. 1921

A number of high-quality manufacturers produced C melody saxophones (including Buescher, C. G. Conn, Martin, King, and Selmer) from 1914 through 1930. Most of these companies also manufactured "stencil" saxophones for other vendors under different names. For example, those labeled Harwood Jenkins, Lyon & Healy, Oliver Ditson, and Wurlitzer American were all actually made by Buescher. Production of C melody saxophones appears to have reached a peak around 1923, with a gradual reduction thereafter. Comparatively few C melody saxophones were made in the late 1920s. The Conn straight-neck Tenor in C is the most common of the actual orchestral saxophones, with a more classical sound playing in tune throughout its range. This is one of the few models actually made for professional use. However, the long, straight neck means that the saxophone must be held away from the player's body, a posture which some people may find uncomfortable.

Cheaper, novelty C melody saxophones were marketed from the late 1910s through the early 1930s as a version of the saxophone intended for amateur use, in homes, schools, and town bands. It was made with a bore considerably narrower than that of the B♭ tenor saxophone, being more or less a "stretched" version of the alto saxophone bore.

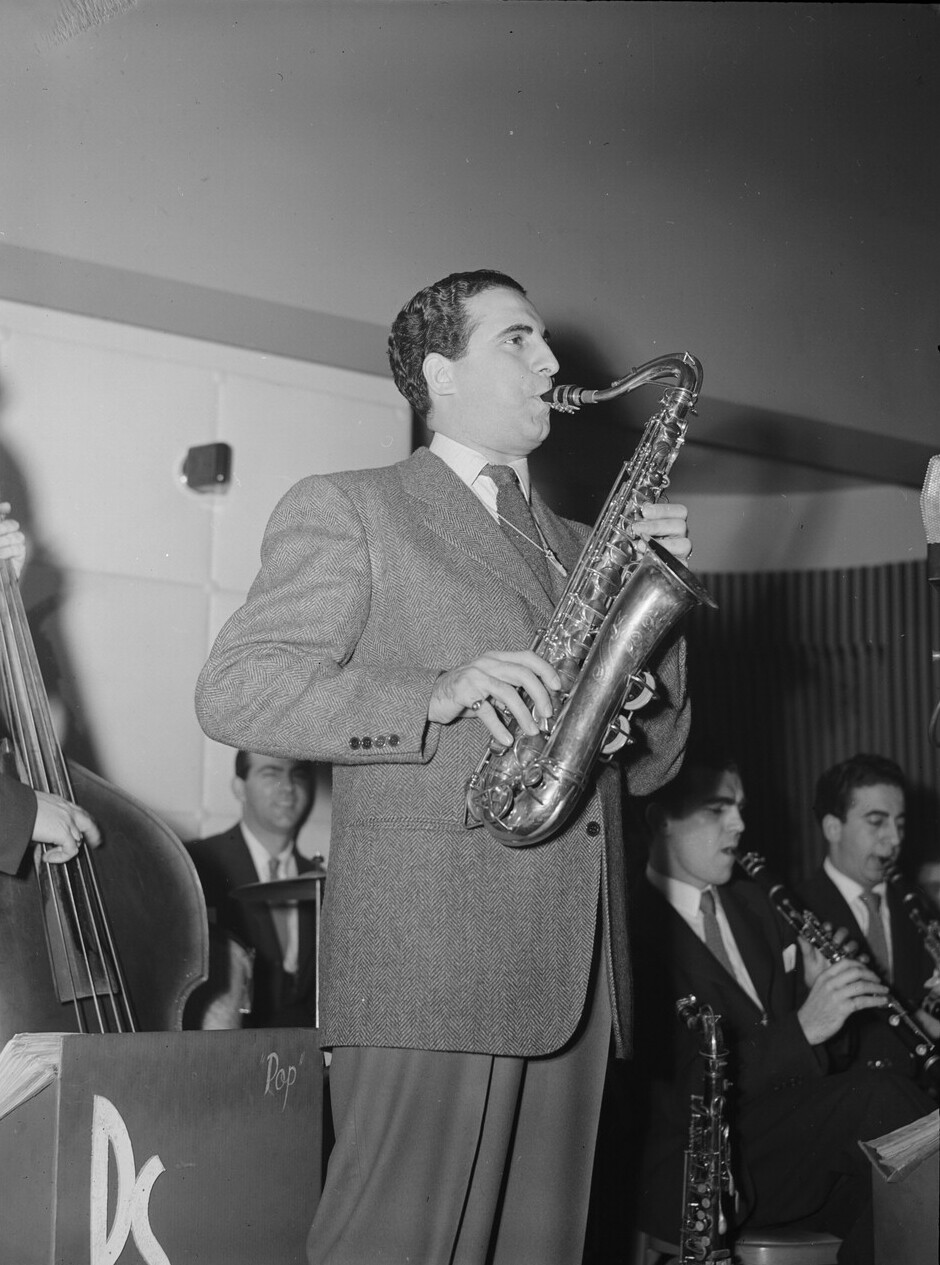
Dick Stabile playing a C melody saxophone in New York, c. 1947

By the late 1920s, the popularity of C melody saxophones had faded. Sales of all saxophones fell dramatically after the Wall Street crash of 1929, and the C melody was one of several models (including the mezzo-soprano saxophone) which were dropped from production soon after. Production ended for purely financial reasons and not because of any inherent flaw in the design or poor manufacturing standards. That is, a C melody saxophone was as good as the reputation of whichever company manufactured it. The basic problem was that the Great Depression which immediately followed the stock market crash caused extremely harsh economic conditions throughout the world, which affected the production of all leisure-related consumer products. This unusually profound recession hit saxophone manufacturers hard, forcing them to reduce the range of musical instruments they produced down to the most popular models, in order to remain in business. As a result, production of C melody saxophones ended abruptly. By the time the world economy had recovered sufficiently for C melody saxophones to be economically viable again (around 1935) people's leisure time interests had changed and there was no longer a market for them. Additionally, in the early 1930s, the big band era had begun, and anyone who wanted to learn the saxophone was interested primarily in soprano, alto, tenor, or baritone, because big bands did not feature the C melody saxophone. As a result, there was no consumer demand for C melody instruments, so would-be manufacturers had no incentive to resume production. Not surprisingly, instrument manufacturers concentrated instead on making other types which had strong customer demand and were easy to sell, mainly the alto and tenor. C. G. Conn made a small number of C melody saxophones during the 1930s which were stamped with the model number "8M". These were almost certainly completed saxophone bodies that had been kept in storage since the 1920s and which were furnished with updated keywork following the Great Depression. At least one Conn C melody dating from 1938 has "transitional" keywork (similar to that found on a Conn 6M alto or Conn 10M tenor) plus a "Lady Face" engraving on the bell front. However, late model Conn C melody saxophones like these are extremely unusual, because they are rare exceptions to the general rule that production of C melody saxophones ended in 1930.

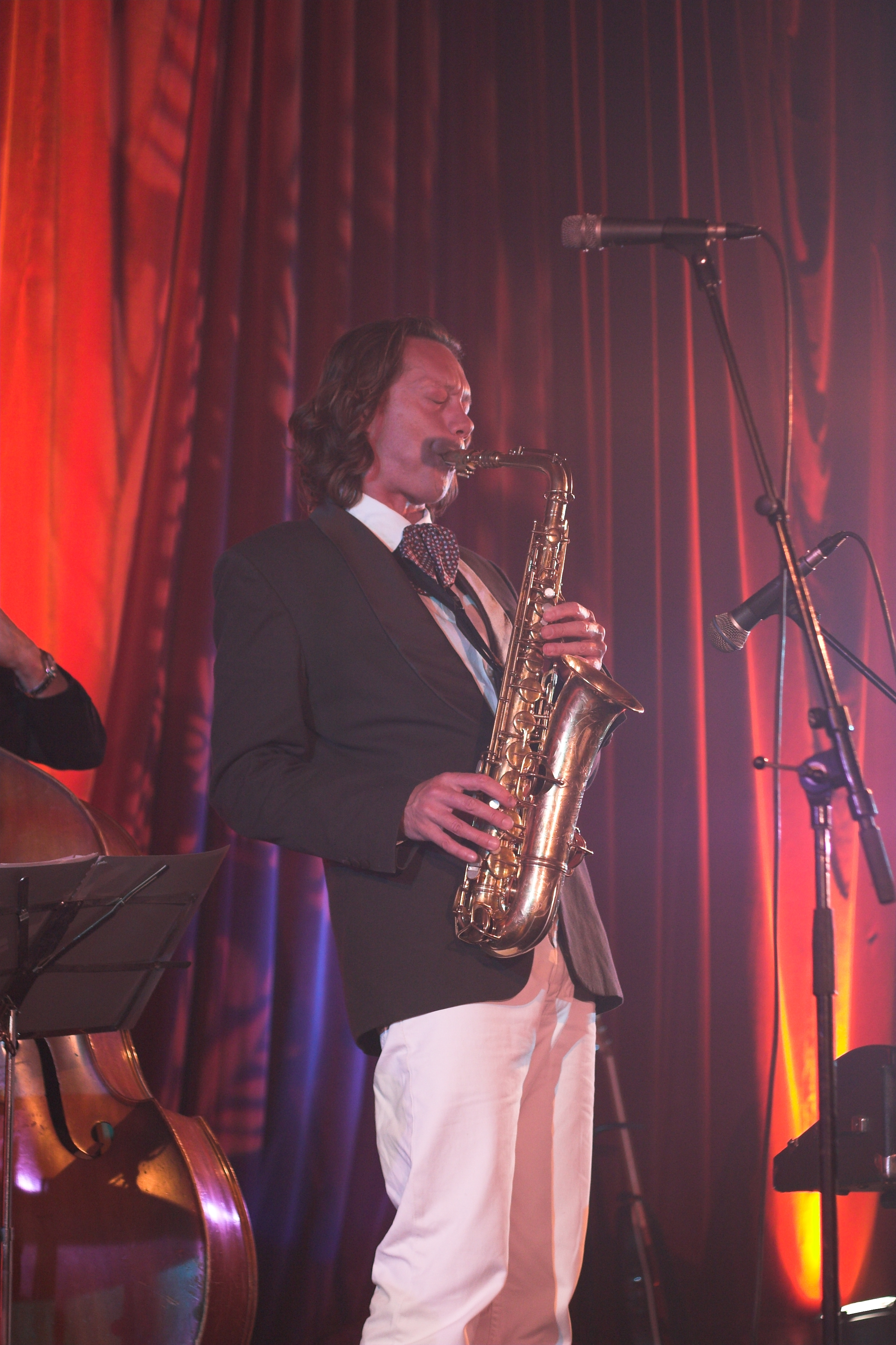
Nathan Haines performing on a Conn C melody saxophone in 2006

During the 1960s, the French woodwind manufacturer Leblanc produced C melody saxophones under the Vito imprint, though it is thought that they manufactured fewer than 20 examples.

Some early jazz musicians got their start on the C melody, including Benny Carter and Coleman Hawkins, though Carter eventually moved to the alto, and Hawkins to the B♭ tenor. Among the most famous musicians to perform primarily on the C melody was Rudy Weidoeft. Although he played alto and soprano saxophones as well (the latter in ensembles with Arnold Brilhart and Alford Evans), he made his most famous recordings on the C melody and was a significant factor in popularizing the instrument among the general public. Another famous C melody player was Frankie Trumbauer, a jazz musician who was known for his superb technical ability on the instrument and influence on later generations. Jack Pettis, a member of the Ben Bernie orchestra and a recording artist under his own name, was another skilled player of the instrument.

A few modern-day saxophonists occasionally perform on C melody instruments, though rarely if ever as a primary instrument. Examples include Anthony Braxton, Kyle Vincent, Scott Robinson, Rick Arbuckle, Rosy McHargue, Dan Levinson, Hayes Greenfield, Allen Lowe, and Joe Lovano. Carla Bley, though mainly a keyboardist, played C melody saxophone occasionally on recordings led by her daughter, Karen Mantler.

Despite the fact that they have not been manufactured in over 75 years, C melody saxophones are readily available today, due to their limited use and the sheer number that were produced in the early 20th century. They can often be found at stores that carry used instruments, garage sales, jumble sales, and pawn shops across the United States.

== Related and new instruments ==
- Another saxophone pitched in C, called the contralto saxophone, has been produced by California instrument maker Jim Schmidt since the late 1990s. It is a modern design and differs from the vintage C melody instruments in several ways, most notably its linear chromatic fingering system.
- Starting 2007, the New Zealand company Aquilasax began producing a modern C melody tenor saxophone. However, they ceased operation in June 2015, stating "our saxes are more popular with customers than with the factory that makes them. We have been unable to solve this problem and have not been able to make the business profitable as a result."
- Beginning in 2012, Thomann, the well-known German instrument manufacturer, began selling a completely new line of C melodies. They sell two versions, one in pure silver plate and one in regular brass lacquer.
- As of 2014, modern C melody saxophones are available under the Sax.co.uk house label Sakkusu, as well as on eBay from assorted Chinese manufacturers.
