= Subcontrabass saxophone =

Largest low-pitched instrument in the saxophone family

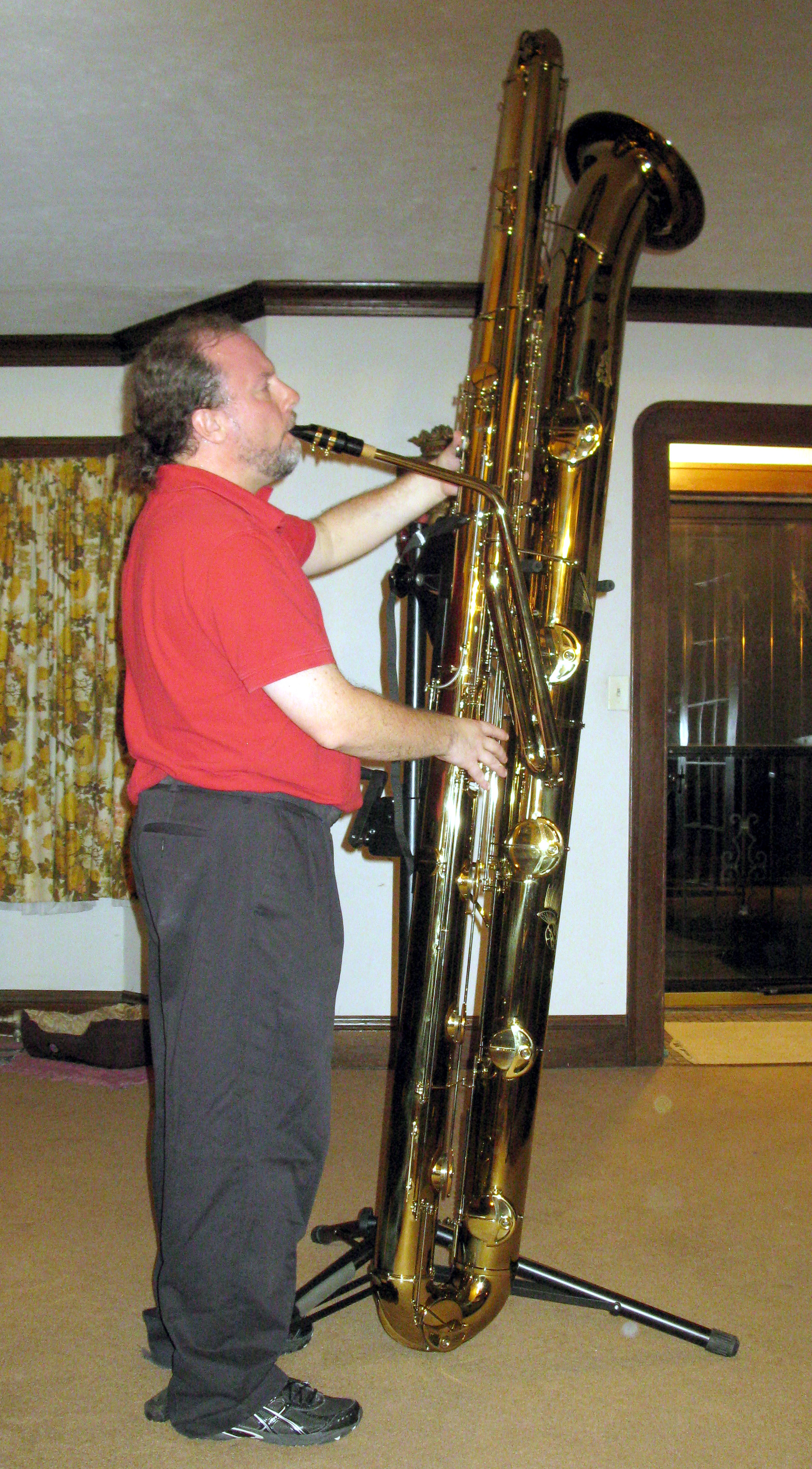
- Eppelsheim full-size subcontrabass in B♭

Woodwind instrument
- Classification: Single-reed
- Hornbostel–Sachs classification: 422.212-71 (Single-reed aerophone with keys)
- Inventor: Adolphe Sax
- Developed: Conceived 1846; first instrument 2010

Playing range
- The subcontrabass saxophone in B♭ sounds three octaves and a major second lower than written. The first model, created by J'Élle Stainer, extended to a written low B♭ (sounding A♭). A subsequent model by Benedikt Eppelsheim reached a written low A (sounding G).

Related instruments
- Sizes: Soprillo; Sopranino; Soprano; Alto; Tenor; Baritone; Bass; Contrabass; Subcontrabass; Orchestral saxophones: C soprano; Mezzo-soprano; C melody; Specialty saxophones: Aulochrome; Tubax

Musicians
- Attilio Berni; Jay C. Easton; Gilberto Lopes; Todd White

Builders
- Benedikt Eppelsheim; Galassine; J'Élle Stainer

The subcontrabass saxophone is the largest of the family of saxophones that Adolphe Sax described in his 1846 patent. In the patent paperwork, he called it the saxophone bourdon, named after the very low-pitched 32′ bourdon pedal stop on large pipe organs. Sax planned to build one, but did not; the first playable subcontrabass saxophone was built in 2010. It is a transposing instrument pitched in B♭, one octave below the bass saxophone, two octaves below the tenor, and three octaves and a major second below its written pitch.

== History ==
Although described in Adolphe Sax's patent in 1846, a practical, playable subcontrabass saxophone did not exist until the 21st century. An oversized saxophone that might have qualified was built as a prop around 1965; it could produce tones, but its non-functional keywork required assistants to manually open and close the pads, and it was reportedly incapable of playing a simple scale.

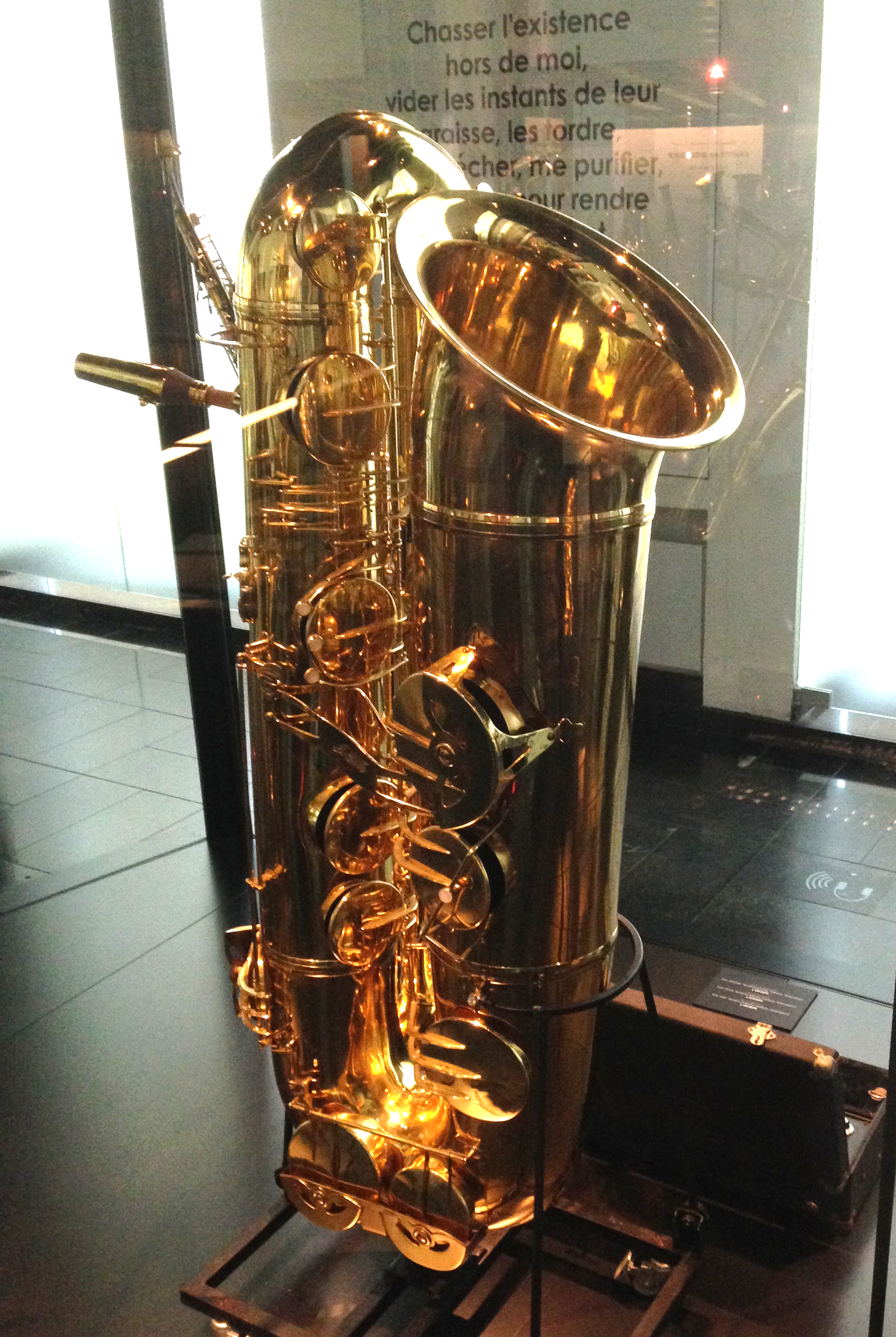
Compact subcontrabass saxophone manufactured by J'Élle Stainer c. 2010, Musical Instruments Museum, Brussels

The tubax was developed in two sizes in 1999 by German instrument manufacturer Benedikt Eppelsheim, the lower of which, pitched in B♭, he described as a "subcontrabass saxophone". This instrument provides the same pitch range that the saxophone bourdon would have, while the smaller tubax in E♭ covers the range of the contrabass saxophone. Compared to a regular saxophone of the same pitch, a tubax has a narrower bore and uses a smaller reed.

In the 2000s, contrabass and subcontrabass saxophones became popular in church orchestras in Brazil and are made by Brazilian instrument manufacturers J'Élle Stainer and Galassine. J'Élle Stainer produced a working compact subcontrabass saxophone in 2010 which was shown that year at Expomusic. In September 2012, Eppelsheim built the first full-size subcontrabass saxophone in B♭ (distinct from his B♭ tubax). In July 2013, J'Élle Stainer completed a full-size subcontrabass saxophone; It stands 2.74 metres (9.0 ft) high and weighs 28.6 kilograms (63 lb). In Brazil, at least one octocontrabass saxophone, built in E♭ an octave below the contrabass, has been made.

== Repertoire ==
There is no historical classical music or jazz repertoire specifically scored for a subcontrabass saxophone, since playable instruments have only existed since 2010. Two works first performed in 2022, Slovenian composer Igor Krivokapič's Symphony No. 5 and Colores by Belgian composer Jan Van der Roost, both feature the instrument.

Low-pitched saxophones in general have become popular in Brazil, particularly in the large church orchestras of the Christian Congregation in Brazil that accompany hymns.

== See also ==
- Tubax
