= Soprillo =

Smallest member in the saxophone family

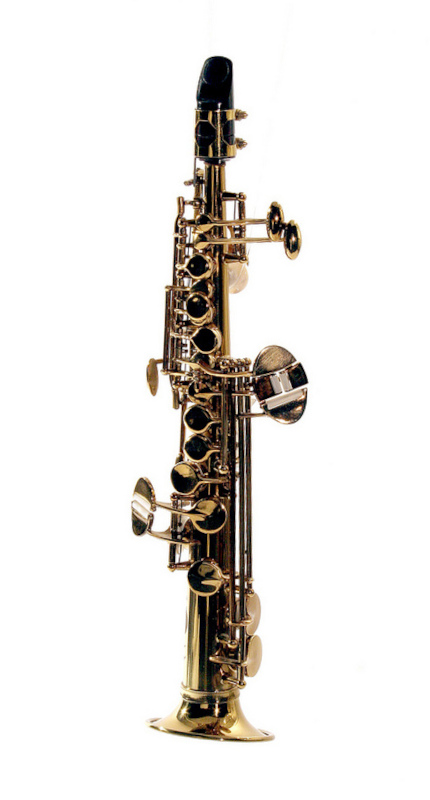
- Eppelsheim soprillo saxophone, c. 2000s

Woodwind instrument
- Classification: Single-reed
- Hornbostel–Sachs classification: 422.212-71 (Single-reed aerophone with keys)
- Inventors: Benedikt Eppelsheim; Robert van Linthout; Adolphe Sax
- Developed: Late 1990s

Playing range
- The soprillo in B♭ sounds a minor seventh higher than written.

Related instruments
- Sizes: Soprillo; sopranino; soprano; alto; tenor; baritone; bass; contrabass; subcontrabass; Orchestral saxophones: C soprano; mezzo-soprano; C melody; Specialty saxophones: Aulochrome; tubax

Musicians
- Attilio Berni; Jay C. Easton; Vinny Golia; Nigel Wood

Builders
- Benedikt Eppelsheim

The soprillo, also known as the piccolo saxophone or rarely sopranissimo saxophone, is the highest pitched and smallest saxophone. The soprillo was developed as a piccolo extension to the saxophone family in the late 1990s by the German instrument maker Benedikt Eppelsheim, although a working prototype sopranissimo of the same pitch was made in 1960 in a more compact, curved form.

The soprillo is pitched in B♭, one octave above the soprano saxophone, and half its length, at 33 centimetres (13 in) including the mouthpiece.

== History ==
Adolphe Sax's 1846 patent for the saxophone specified a family of saxophones in several sizes and pitches, ranging from the giant subcontrabass bourdon in B♭ to the sopranino saxophone aigu in E♭ or F. An instrument smaller and higher-pitched than the sopranino was described in method books published in the same year, before many sizes of saxophone were ever built. The 1846 saxophone methods by Jean-François-Barthélémy Cokken and Jean-Georges Kastner both provide transposition charts for seven sizes, starting with the saxophone sur aigu in C and B♭, an octave or minor seventh above concert pitch (although they omit the tenor size and either the alto or baritone size).

The first playable piccolo saxophone was a prototype sopranissimo built in 1960, in B♭, a fifth higher than the sopranino. It was hand-made by the Brussels-based maker Robert van Linthout in the familiar curved saxophone form with the bell pointing upwards and measured barely 20 centimetres (7.9 in) in length.

In 1998, the German instrument maker Benedikt Eppelsheim finished his first Piccolo-Saxophon (lit. 'piccolo saxophone'), also pitched in B♭ and built with a straight body, like a typical soprano saxophone. He called it the soprillo and exhibited it in Frankfurt along with his prototype tubax in March 1999.

== Construction ==
The soprillo is pitched in B♭ and is the smallest saxophone, at 33 cm (13 in) long including the mouthpiece. The mouthpiece is non-removable, and the ligature, integrated into the instrument, is designed to fit the small reeds for the sopranino E♭ clarinet.

Compared to a soprano saxophone, the soprillo is pitched one octave higher and is half its length. Constructing such a small saxophone presents several challenges. Most saxophones have keys for high F and F♯, but the soprillo only has keywork to high E♭. The small size of the soprillo requires the upper octave key be integrated into the mouthpiece.

As of 2025, the Eppelsheim soprillo is the only piccolo-sized saxophone manufactured. They are expensive compared to other small saxophones; due to very limited demand, they are only built to order.

== Performance and repertoire ==
The soprillo is difficult to play, especially in the high register. The small size of both the mouthpiece and the reed requires a strong embouchure but also makes the soprillo easily accessible to players experienced with E♭ clarinet or sopranino saxophone. There is very little music written explicitly for the soprillo, given its short history and extremely high pitch. British saxophonist Nigel Wood wrote and commissioned several solo soprillo works, performing and recording them for his 2008 CD Soprillogy. Saxophonists Vinny Golia, Jay C. Easton, and Attilio Berni also perform and record on soprillo.
