= J'Élle Stainer =

Brazilian saxophone manufacturer

J'Élle Stainer is a musical instrument manufacturer specialising in large saxophones based in Italy and São Paulo, Brazil. They are notable for building some of the first subcontrabass saxophones, the largest of the family of instruments conceived of by its Belgian inventor in the 1840s, Adolphe Sax.

In the 2000s, J'Élle Stainer made contrabass saxophones for the popular large church orchestras of the Christian Congregation in Brazil. In 2010 they produced the first working subcontrabass saxophone, albeit in a more compact form than originally envisaged, more than 160 years after Sax first described it in his 1846 patent. This instrument was shown that year at Expomusic. In 2013, J'Élle Stainer completed the second full-size subcontrabass saxophone, after German maker Benedikt Eppelsheim built the first a year earlier. It stands 2.74 metres (9 ft 0 in) high and weighs 28.6 kilograms (63 lb).

J'Élle Stainer also make a stainerfone, a contrabass saxophone built in a more compact form, comparable in size to a baritone saxophone.
