= Hayes Greenfield =

American jazz musician

- Also known as: Haze Greenfield
- Born: Harold Greenfield; July 7, 1957 (age 69); Poughkeepsie, New York
- Genres: Jazz
- Occupations: Musician, arranger, film composer, educator
- Instruments: Alto saxophone, C melody saxophone
- Years active: 1987–present
- Labels: Blackhawk; Special; Owl Time Line; Baby Music Boom; Dots & Lines; Survival; Sunnyside
- Website: hayesgreenfield.com

Hayes or Haze Greenfield (born July 7, 1957 as Harold Greenfield) is an American jazz saxophonist (alto and C-melody saxophone), arranger, film composer, teacher, and author.

== Biography ==
=== Early life ===
Greenfield was born in Poughkeepsie, New York, and began playing piano aged five, drums aged 10, and saxophone from the age of 15. He graduated from Choate Rosemary Hall in 1975, and then studied at the Berklee School of Music in Boston. From 1980 to 1985, he took private lessons with Hal Galper, Jaki Byard, and George Coleman.

=== Career ===
Greenfield released his first album, All About You, in 1987 on Blackhawk Records with Ray Drummond, Jaki Byard, Tom Harrell, Jim Greenfield, Newman Baker, Michael Carillo, and Miguel Fuentez. Jazz critic Len Dobbin described it as an "impressive debut". Another jazz critic wrote, "Greenfield can drive with a hard boppish edge on tenor but just as easily slip into lyrical, seamless designs on soprano sax. ... [He] pays tribute to jazz traditions and innovators in the most positive way, avoiding slavish copying. Recommended."

His 2005 album Peace of Mind was described as "a thoroughly enjoyable and palatable listen, a sonic equivalent of a painting with a wide array of colors all complementing each other." The reviewer considered Greenfield "a traditional composer and a good one, with attention to attractive melodies, harmony, and form. ... He is convincing as a singer, too ... his voice is smooth and smoky, with a slight edge of rasp". In 2007, he released two albums, which, according to a reviewer in All About Jazz, both "show[] his proficiency as a composer and saxophonist and the way that his writing and playing style recalls the great songs and jazzmen of the glorious past."

Greenfield produced two albums for children. A reviewer in All About Jazz described the first, the 1998 album Jazz-A-Ma-Tazz, as "pure jazz of the highest quality" that "isn't just for the children. Under his leadership, the session swings hard and reveals plenty of hot soloing." Another reviewer compared it favourably to albums for children by "easily recognizable names," saying "Hayes Greenfield's jazz renditions of kids' tunes are so well produced and true to form, adults will enjoy listening along with their little ones." His second release for children was Music for a Green Planet, in 2008. Greenfield and an environmental activist from New York, Margo Schepart, wrote new words with an environmental messages for tunes familiar to children. One reviewer described the songs as "surprisingly palatable", while the jazz was "hot – and very cool".

From 1993 to 2000, Greenfield was head of the music department at a New York City enrichment center for children at risk. In 1997, he founded Jazz-A-Ma-Tazz, a music education program which provides workshops and interactive concerts for children, in which about 20,000 children participate each year across the United States. He introduces children to jazz by playing jazz versions of popular music tunes, including theme songs from The Flintstones and The Simpsons. Greenfield has also worked as artist-in-residence at schools. In 2024 he published Creative Sound Play for Young Learners – A Teacher's Guide to Enhancing Transition Times, Classroom Communities, SEL, and Executive Function Skills.

== Discography ==
=== As leader or co-leader ===
- 1987 – All About You (Blackhawk Records)
- 1988 – Sounds of Thought (Special Music Company)
- 1988 – Five for the City (Owl Time Line)
- 1998 – Jazz-A-Ma-Tazz (Baby Music Boom) with Richie Havens
- 2005 – Peace of Mind (Dots & Lines), with David Berkman, Cameron Brown and Mark Johnson
- 2007 – Duo + One (Survival Records, Dots & Lines) with Rashied Ali and Don Pate
- 2007 – Because of You! (Dots & Lines), with Neal Kirkwood, Ed Schuller and George Schuller
- 2008 – Music for a Green Planet, with Joe Lee Wilson, Shayna Steele, Miles Griffith and others
- 2023 – Lover to You (Sunnyside) with Dean Johnson

=== Collaborations ===
- 2015 – A Day in Brooklyn (Constant Sorrow) with Allen Lowe

=== Film scores ===
- 1994 – George Marshall & the American Century
- 1996 – Unforgotten: Twenty-Five Years After Willowbrook
- 2001 – The Paris Review: Early Chapters
- 2001 – Asylum
- 2001 – Meeting with a Killer
- 2001 – Science Times
- 2002 – America Rebuilds: A Year at Ground Zero
- 2006 – American Rebuilds II: Return to Ground Zero
- 2007 – Looking for Miguel
- 2009 – Journeyman Architect: The Life and Work of Donald Wexler
- 2009 – Building Alaska
- 2010 – Memories of Overdevelopment
- 2010 – William Krisel, Architect
- 2010 – Common Blood
- 2012 – Modern Tide: Midcentury Architecture on Long Island
- 2013 – Alaska, the World and Wally Hickel
- 2014 – The American Nurse
- 2014 – The Nature of Modernism: E. Stewart Williams, Architect
- 2015 – Aurora Borealis
- 2015 – Inventing Cornell Tech: The Vision
- 2023 – In Search of Resolution
