= Harry Gold (musician) =

English jazz saxophonist and bandleader (1907–2005)

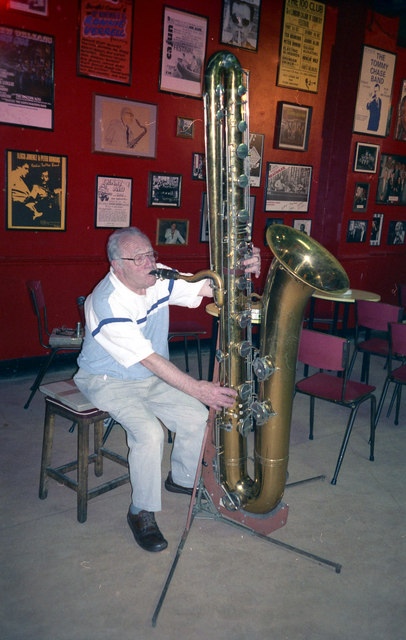
Gold aged 89, demonstrating the contrabass saxophone in the 100 Club, London, 1996

Harry Gold (born Hyman Goldberg; 26 February 1907 – 13 November 2005) was an English British Dixieland jazz saxophonist and bandleader.

== Biography ==
The eldest of six children, born to a Romanian mother, Hetty Schulman, and a Polish father, Sam Goldberg, Gold's career spanned almost the whole history of jazz in Britain in the 20th century. Born in Whitechapel, London, in 1907, and raised in the East End of London, he decided on a career in music after his father took him to see the Original Dixieland Jazz Band playing at the Hammersmith Palais during their famous visit to Britain in 1919–1920. He studied saxophone, clarinet, oboe and music theory under Louis Kimmel, a professor at the London College of Music, and began working professionally as a musician in the early 1920s. He played with the Metronomes, Vic Filmer, Geraldo, Ambrose and many other bands, but it was his tenure as a star tenor saxophonist with the nationally popular dance band of Roy Fox from 1932 to 1937 that brought him to wide public attention.

Playing plush London venues such as the Cafe Anglais and the Café de Paris, he watched, from the bandstand, the London nobility of the inter-war years – including the Prince of Wales – enjoying the high life. However, the contrasts in wealth and poverty that he saw reinforced his socialist convictions. From that time and through most of the rest of his career he was active in union activities and in efforts to promote the welfare of other musicians.

== Pieces of Eight ==
In 1937, while working with Oscar Rabin, Gold formed a band within the Rabin orchestra, performing "break sets" as "The Pieces of Eight"; this continued throughout World War II, dodging bombs during the London Blitz and across the country. After the war, thanks to radio broadcasts, records and incessant touring, Harry Gold and his Pieces of Eight became household names in Britain throughout the late 1940s and 1950s.

In July 1945, Gold and his Pieces of Eight made the first of nearly 200 appearances on BBC radio. In December of the same year, the band recorded for the first time, and from July 1946, they began regularly appearing on the BBC's Music While You Work radio show. The band were still making appearances on BBC Radio in the 1990s.

In 1946, the group almost became one of the first British bands to perform on television, but their performance was not broadcast because Gold's black singer and trombonist, Geoff Love, sang a duet with the band's female white singer, Jane Lee. However, a performance at the 1947 Jazz Jamboree launched the Pieces of Eight to belated national prominence, and, in 1948, Harry Gold and his Pieces of Eight accompanied the singer and composer Hoagy Carmichael on a well-received tour of the UK.

Eventually, however, tired of touring, Gold handed over the band to his brother Laurie on New Year's Eve 1955, and opted for a quieter life as a composer-arranger, working for music publishers and later for the EMI organisation. He continued to play, however, joining Dick Sudhalter's New Paul Whiteman Orchestra in London in the 1970s and eventually reforming his Pieces of Eight. The band was inspired by the Bob Crosby Bobcats, and Laurie Gold by Eddie Miller.

In the 1980s, the band toured East Germany three times. In 2000, he published his autobiography, Gold, Doubloons and Pieces of Eight, recalling eight decades as a working musician.
