= Soprano saxophone =

Small member of the saxophone family

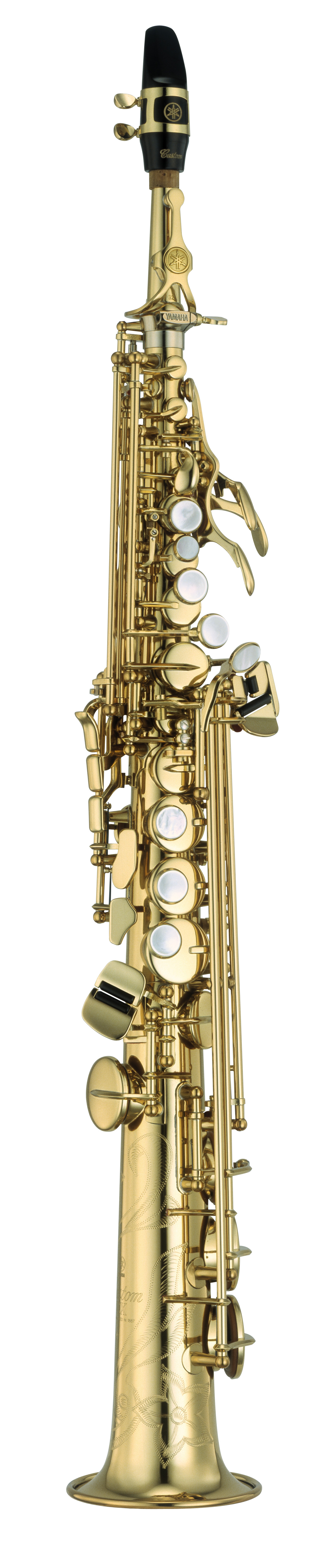

Woodwind instrument
- Classification: Single-reed
- Hornbostel–Sachs classification: 422.212-71 (Single-reed aerophone with keys)
- Inventor: Adolphe Sax
- Developed: 1840s

Playing range
- The soprano saxophone in B♭ sounds a major second lower than written. Many models have a high F♯ key, and higher pitches are possible using altissimo fingerings.

Related instruments
- Sizes: Soprillo; sopranino; soprano; alto; tenor; baritone; bass; contrabass; subcontrabass; Orchestral saxophones: C soprano; mezzo-soprano; C melody; Specialty saxophones: Aulochrome; tubax

Musicians
- See list of saxophonists

Pattern of 5 notes of Reed Phase played on soprano saxophone

The soprano saxophone is a small, high-pitched member of the saxophone family of woodwind instruments invented in the 1840s by Belgian instrument maker Adolphe Sax. Built in B♭, an octave above the tenor saxophone (or rarely, slightly smaller in C), the soprano is the smallest of the four saxophones in common use (the others being the alto, tenor and baritone), although there are smaller rare instruments such as the soprillo and sopranino.

== The instrument ==
A transposing instrument pitched in the key of B♭, the modern soprano saxophone with a high F♯ key has a range from concert A♭_{3} to E_{6} (written low B♭ to high F♯) and is therefore pitched one octave above the tenor saxophone. There is also a soprano saxophone pitched in C, which is uncommon; most examples were produced in America in the 1920s.

The soprano has all the keys of other saxophone models (with the exception of the low A on some baritones and altos). Soprano saxophones were originally keyed from low B to high E♭, but a low B♭ mechanism was patented in 1887 and by 1910 nearly all saxophones were keyed to low B♭, including sopranos. During the 1920s, it became standard for sopranos to be keyed to high F. Starting in the 1950s, high F♯ was offered as an option on some sopranos, and by the 1970s, most professional-level instruments had a high F♯ key. Nearly all sopranos made today are keyed to high F♯ as standard, and some recent professional sopranos (e.g. those made by Yanagisawa, Selmer, and Yamaha) may have a high G key next to the F♯ key. Additionally, skilled players can make use of the altissimo register, which allows them to cover these notes and play even higher, usually regardless of their instrument's keyed range.

Many sopranos made since the 1990s feature detachable necks and will include one straight and one curved neck. A fully straight soprano must be held upward and outward while playing, which allows it to project well and can allow for a more energetic appearance in performance. A curved neck allows the instrument to be held downward, more like a clarinet or oboe, and still maintain a playable mouthpiece angle, and players often report it improves their sound, producing a warmer timbre. Some players and repair technicians prefer one-piece sopranos over those with detachable necks, due to wear and air leaks that can develop around the neck receiver and tenon system, hindering playability. One-piece instruments are sometimes curved during manufacturing above the octave key, like the Yamaha YSS-62R and YSS-82ZR.

Some manufacturers also produce fully curved sopranos, with the same form as an alto saxophone. There are also saxello-style or tipped-bell sopranos, built straight but with the bell curved outward, and typically with a curved neck. These resemble the "Saxello" model introduced by King in the 1920s, although the original King Saxello has a wider bore and its bell is angled at a steeper 90° than most later models.

All straight and curved variants have the same keys and range as the traditional straight soprano, but as with the necks, some players believe curved and tipped-bell sopranos sound warmer and less nasal.

Due to the higher pitch of the soprano, it is more sensitive with respect to intonation than the lower saxophones, so a player must have more skill with breath support, tongue and soft palate position, and embouchure (collectively known as voicing). It is also less forgiving of poor maintenance than lower saxophones.

Soprano saxophone mouthpieces are available in various designs, allowing players to tailor their tone as desired.

== In classical music ==
The soprano saxophone is mainly used as a solo and chamber instrument in classical music, though it is occasionally used in a concert band or orchestra. It is included in the saxophone quartet and plays a lead role. Many solo pieces have been written for it by composers such as Heitor Villa-Lobos, Alan Hovhaness, Jennifer Higdon, Takashi Yoshimatsu, Charles Koechlin, John Mackey, John Corigliano, Rolf Martinsson, Sven-David Sandström, Kalevi Aho, Anders Hillborg, Britta Byström, Victoria Borisova-Ollas and Andrea Tarrodi.

As an orchestral instrument, it has been used in several compositions. It was used by Richard Strauss in his Sinfonia Domestica, where included in the music are parts for four saxophones, including a soprano saxophone in C. It is also used in Maurice Ravel's "Boléro" and has a featured solo (the most part of it being originally written for sopranino saxophone in F) directly following the tenor saxophone's solo. Vincent d'Indy includes a soprano in his opera Fervaal.

Notable classical soprano saxophonists include Carina Rascher, Christine Rall, Eugene Rousseau, Kenneth Tse, Jean-Yves Fourmeau, John Harle, Claude Delangle, Arno Bornkamp, Timothy McAllister, and Anders Paulsson.

== In jazz ==
While not as popular as the alto and tenor saxes in jazz, the soprano saxophone has played a role in its evolution. Greats of the jazz soprano sax include 1930s virtuoso Sidney Bechet, 1950s innovator Steve Lacy, and, beginning with his landmark 1961 album My Favorite Things, John Coltrane.

Other well-known jazz players include: Wayne Shorter, Paul McCandless, Johnny Hodges, Walter Parazaider, Oliver Nelson, Bob Berg, Joe Farrell, Lucky Thompson, Sonny Fortune, Anthony Braxton, Sam Rivers, Gary Bartz, Bennie Maupin, Branford Marsalis, Kirk Whalum, Jan Garbarek, Paul Winter, Dave Liebman, Evan Parker, Sam Newsome, Kenny G, Jane Ira Bloom and Charlie Mariano (including in his work with bassist Eberhard Weber).

Other notable soprano saxophonists include Julian Smith, Joshua Redman, Jay Beckenstein, Dave Koz, Grover Washington Jr., Ronnie Laws, LeRoi Moore, Sarah Skinner of Red Dirt Skinners, and Nigerian Afrobeat multi-instrumentalist Fela Kuti.

Big band music sometimes calls for an alto or tenor saxophone player to double on soprano saxophone, particularly the lead alto.

== In popular culture ==
Kenny G has become a colloquial icon of the instrument, featuring in occasional commercials and internet memes. Julian Smith, inspired by the work of Kenny G, placed third on Britain's Got Talent in 2009, doing a solo performance in each of three appearances with a soprano saxophone.

== Similar instruments ==
Because of its sometimes similar sound to the oboe, the soprano saxophone can be confused with it by listeners. The soprano saxophone may also be used as a substitute when an oboe is not available.

The soprano saxophone is also sometimes confused with the B♭ clarinet. The clarinet has a distinctly different timbre, is usually much quieter, can play an augmented fourth lower and is commonly played as much as a fifth higher (though the soprano saxophone can also be played this high with altissimo, it is uncommon for a player to do so). The saxophone is made of brass and is either lacquered or plated with silver, gold, or occasionally black nickel, while the clarinet is either black or distinctly wood-grained, with silver or gold keys.

In 2001, François Louis created the aulochrome, a woodwind instrument made of two joined soprano saxophones, which can be played either in unison or in harmony.

== Gallery ==
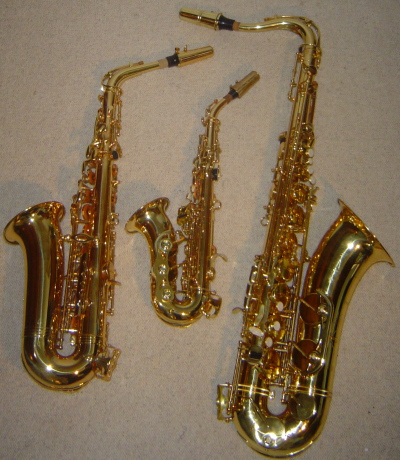
Comparison in size of a curved B♭ soprano saxophone (center), an E♭ alto saxophone (left), and a B♭ tenor saxophone (right)

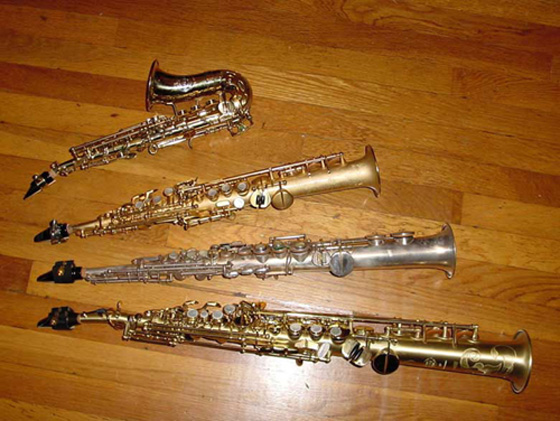
Top to bottom: E♭ sopranino saxophones, curved and straight; soprano saxophones, in C and B♭

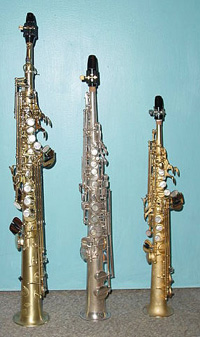
B♭ soprano saxophone (left), C soprano saxophone (center), E♭ sopranino saxophone (right)

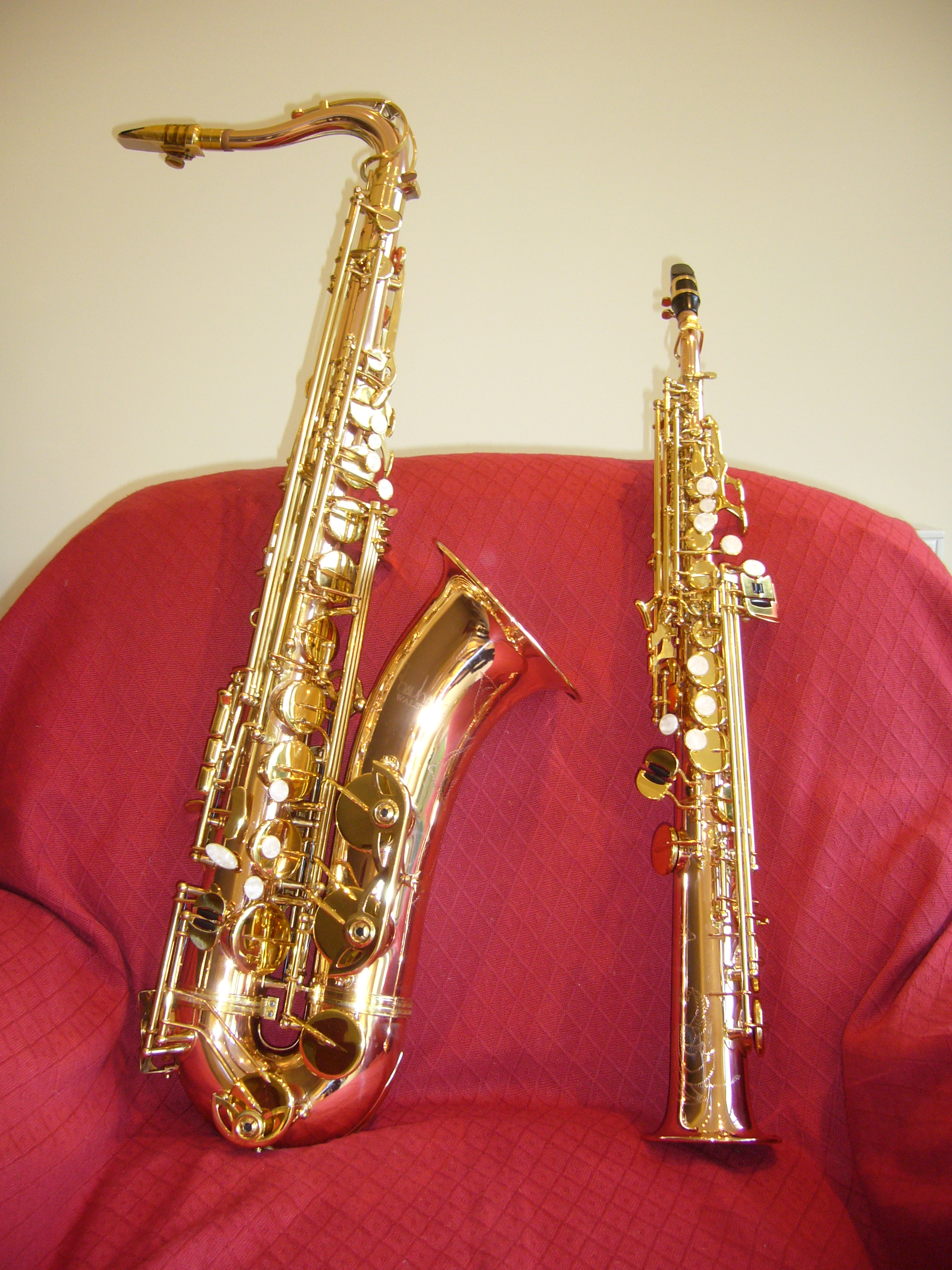
tenor (left) and soprano saxophone (right) made from phosphor bronze, showing their comparative sizes

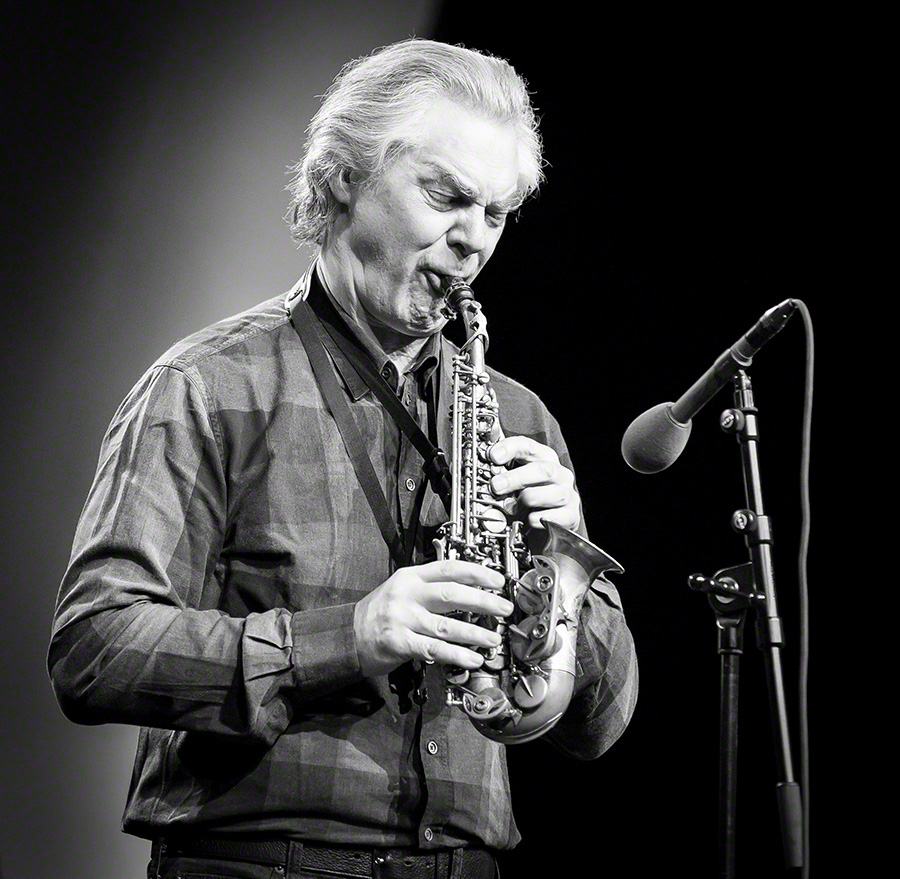
A curved soprano saxophone, played by Jan Garbarek

== See also ==
- List of saxophonists
