= Baritone saxophone =

Lowest-pitched saxophone in common use

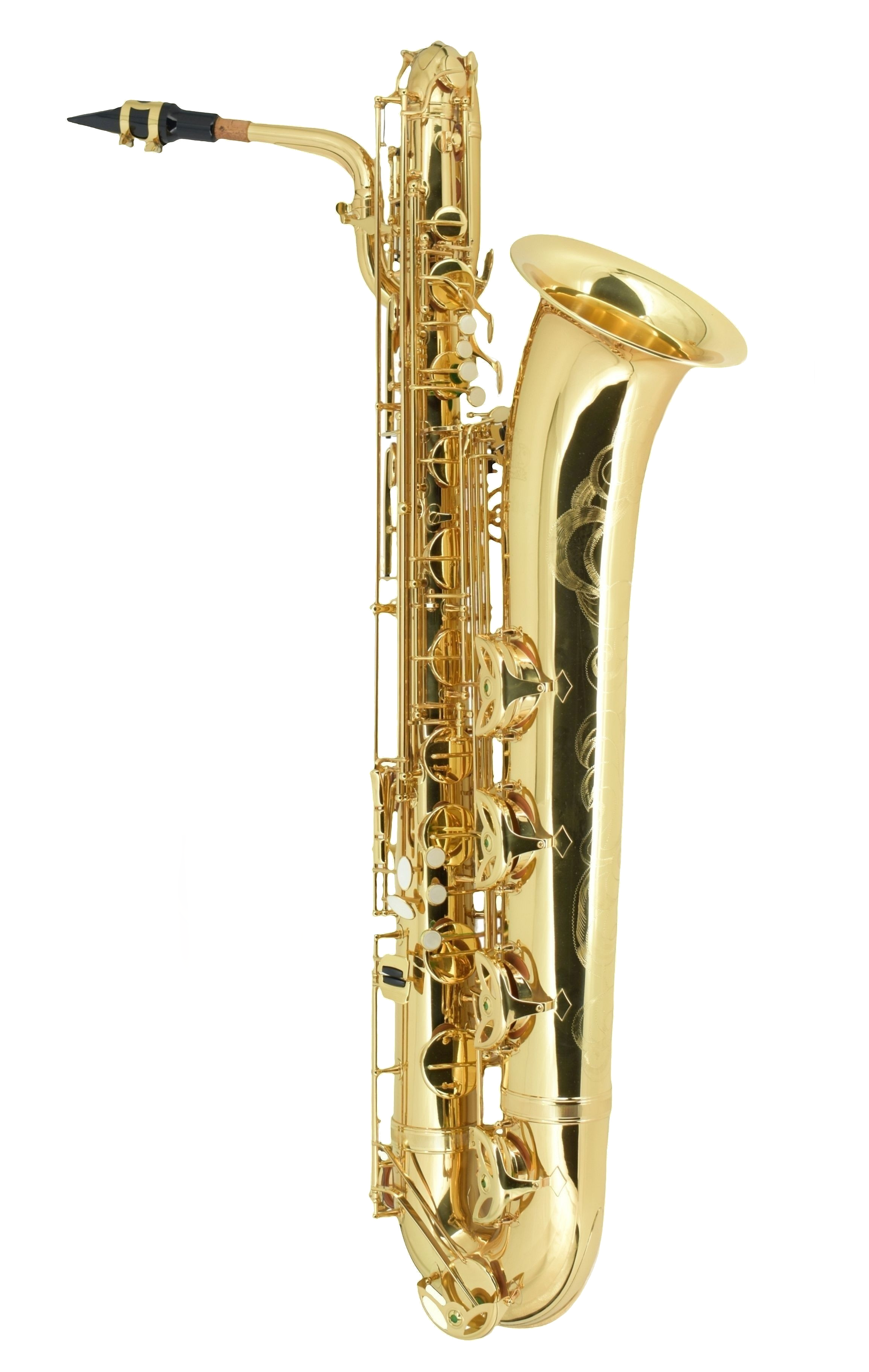
- A "low A" baritone saxophone

Woodwind instrument
- Classification: Single-reed
- Hornbostel–Sachs classification: 422.212-71 (Single-reed aerophone with keys)
- Inventor: Adolphe Sax
- Developed: 1840s

Playing range
- The baritone saxophone in E♭ sounds an octave and a major sixth lower than written. Most models have a key for low A (sounding C), and some have a key for high F♯ (sounding A).

Related instruments
- Sizes: Soprillo; sopranino; soprano; alto; tenor; baritone; bass; contrabass; subcontrabass; Orchestral saxophones: C soprano; mezzo-soprano; C melody; Specialty saxophones: Aulochrome; tubax

Musicians
- See list of saxophonists

The baritone saxophone, commonly abbreviated to "bari sax", is a member of the saxophone family of instruments, larger (and lower-pitched) than the tenor saxophone, but smaller (and higher-pitched) than the bass. It is the lowest-pitched saxophone in common use – the bass, contrabass and especially the subcontrabass saxophones are relatively uncommon. Like all saxophones, it is a single-reed instrument. It is commonly used in concert bands, chamber music, military bands, big bands, and jazz combos. It can also be found in other ensembles such as rock bands and marching bands. Modern baritone saxophones are pitched in E♭.

== History ==
The baritone saxophone was created in 1846 by the Belgian instrument maker Adolphe Sax as one of a family of 14 instruments. Sax believed these instruments would provide a useful tonal link between the woodwinds and brasses. The family was divided into two groups of seven saxophones each, from the soprano to the contrabass. Though a design for an F baritone saxophone is included in the C and F family of saxophones, no known F baritones exist. The family consisting of saxophones in the keys of B♭ and E♭ was more successful because of their popularity in military bands.

All saxophones were originally keyed to low B, but a low B♭ mechanism was patented in 1887 and by 1910 this was standard for most saxophones including baritones. This low B♭ is a concert D♭ on baritone saxophone, and players began creating 'low A pipes' to insert into the bell to extend the range to the very useful concert C just below that (low A on the baritone sax). This modification made the low B♭ inaccessible and low B out of tune. This method is still used today by some players. From the 1930s through the 1950s, manufacturers experimented with extending the bell to add a low A key to the instrument. The simplest way was to add a cylindrical section between the bell and bow to provide the extra length and tone hole, and some makers produced and sold instruments built this way, but these horns generally suffer from intonation problems in the lowest few notes and players often consider their tone poor as well. Selmer Paris began producing low A versions of the Mark VI baritone saxophone in the late 1950s which had a bell that had been designed separately from the low B♭ version (such a bell may have been a custom-order option before this time), and these instruments do not generally suffer from the same intonation problems. In the 1970s, Yamaha's YBS-61 was keyed to low A with no low B♭ option, and by the 1980s most baritones were being manufactured with a low A bell. The low A model is now considered standard and only a few manufacturers still produce low B♭ instruments.

In its original form, the baritone saxophone's highest keyed note was high E♭, but instruments keyed to high F became standard during the 1920s. High F♯ became a rare option starting in the 1950s and slowly became more common, but as with other modern saxophones, most baritones are now manufactured with a high F♯ key.

== Description ==
The baritone saxophone, like other saxophones, is a conical tube of thin brass. It has a wider end, flared to form a bell, and a smaller end connected to a mouthpiece. The baritone saxophone uses a single reed mouthpiece like that of a clarinet. There is a loop in the top of the body (sometimes also known as the 'pigtail') in two U-shaped pieces of tube called the upper bow and spit bow, to reduce it to a practical height.

Baritone saxophones are typically found in two versions with one ranging to low A and the other to low B♭. Despite the ubiquity of the low A horn, some players still prefer to use B♭ horns because of the added weight of a low A bell or because of personal preference for a particular vintage instrument. Some also believe low A horns sound inferior in the low range; however, this is the subject of debate among players.

A baritone saxophone weighs 11 to 20 pounds or 5.0 to 9.1 kilograms, depending on the material and design, making it substantially heavier than a tenor saxophone. Some players use a harness in place of a neck strap to distribute the weight more comfortably. Some modern instruments have a mount for a floor peg, similar to those on bass clarinets, to reduce weight on the player's neck when seated.

== Transposition ==
It is a transposing instrument in the key of E♭, pitched an octave plus a major sixth lower than written. It is one octave lower than the alto saxophone. Modern baritones with a low A key and high F♯ key have a range from C_{2} to A_{4}.

As with all saxophones, its music is written in treble clef. By coincidence, it is possible to use a trick known as clef substitution to read music written in bass clef at concert pitch (for example most tuba or bassoon parts), by reading as if it were a transposing part in treble clef and pretending there were three more sharps (or three fewer flats) in the key signature. A similar trick allows instruments in B♭ like the tenor saxophone to read concert pitch tenor clef.

== Music genre ==
=== Classical music ===
The baritone saxophone is used as a standard member of concert bands and saxophone quartets.

It has also been occasionally called for in music for orchestra. Examples include Richard Strauss' Sinfonia Domestica, which calls for a baritone saxophone in F; Béla Bartók's The Wooden Prince ballet music; Charles Ives' Symphony No. 4, composed in 1910–1916; and Gershwin's Rhapsody in Blue (Grofé's orchestration) and An American in Paris. In his opera The Devils of Loudun (Die Teufel von Loudun), Krzysztof Penderecki calls for two baritone saxes. Karlheinz Stockhausen includes a baritone saxophone in Gruppen and Stravinsky calls for one in his Ebony Concerto.

It has a comparatively small solo repertoire although an increasing number of concertos have appeared, one of these being "Concerto for Saxophone Quartet and Orchestra" by American composer Philip Glass. This is a piece that can be played with or without an orchestra that features the baritone sax in the second movement. The American composer Mark Watters' Rhapsody for Baritone Saxophone has been scored for piano, wind ensemble, and orchestra. This single-movement solo for the baritone sax includes a virtuosic cadenza.

=== Jazz music ===
A number of jazz performers have used the baritone saxophone as their primary instrument. It is part of standard big band instrumentation (the larger bass saxophone was also occasionally used up until the 1940s). As phrased by Alain Cupper from JazzBariSax.com, "Used a few times in contemporary classical music...it is especially in jazz that this wonderful instrument feels most comfortable." One of the instrument's pioneers was Harry Carney, longtime baritone saxophone player in the Duke Ellington band.

Baritone saxophone soloists Gerry Mulligan, Cecil Payne, Sahib Shihab, John C. Williams, Pepper Adams, Serge Chaloff, and Leo Parker achieved fame in the jazz world. Peter Brötzmann is a notable free jazz player.

A noted Scottish performer was Joe Temperley, who appeared with Humphrey Lyttelton as well as with the Lincoln Center Jazz Orchestra.

More recent notable performers include Hamiet Bluiett (who has also led a group of baritone saxophone players), John Surman, Scott Robinson, James Carter, Stephen "Doc" Kupka of the band Tower of Power, Nick Brignola, Gary Smulyan, Brian Landrus, and Ronnie Cuber. In the avant-garde scene, Tim Berne has doubled on bari. Jazz/funk player Leo Pellegrino of Lucky Chops and Too Many Zooz has become popular with younger listeners for his aggressive playing style and energetic performances.

=== In other music ===
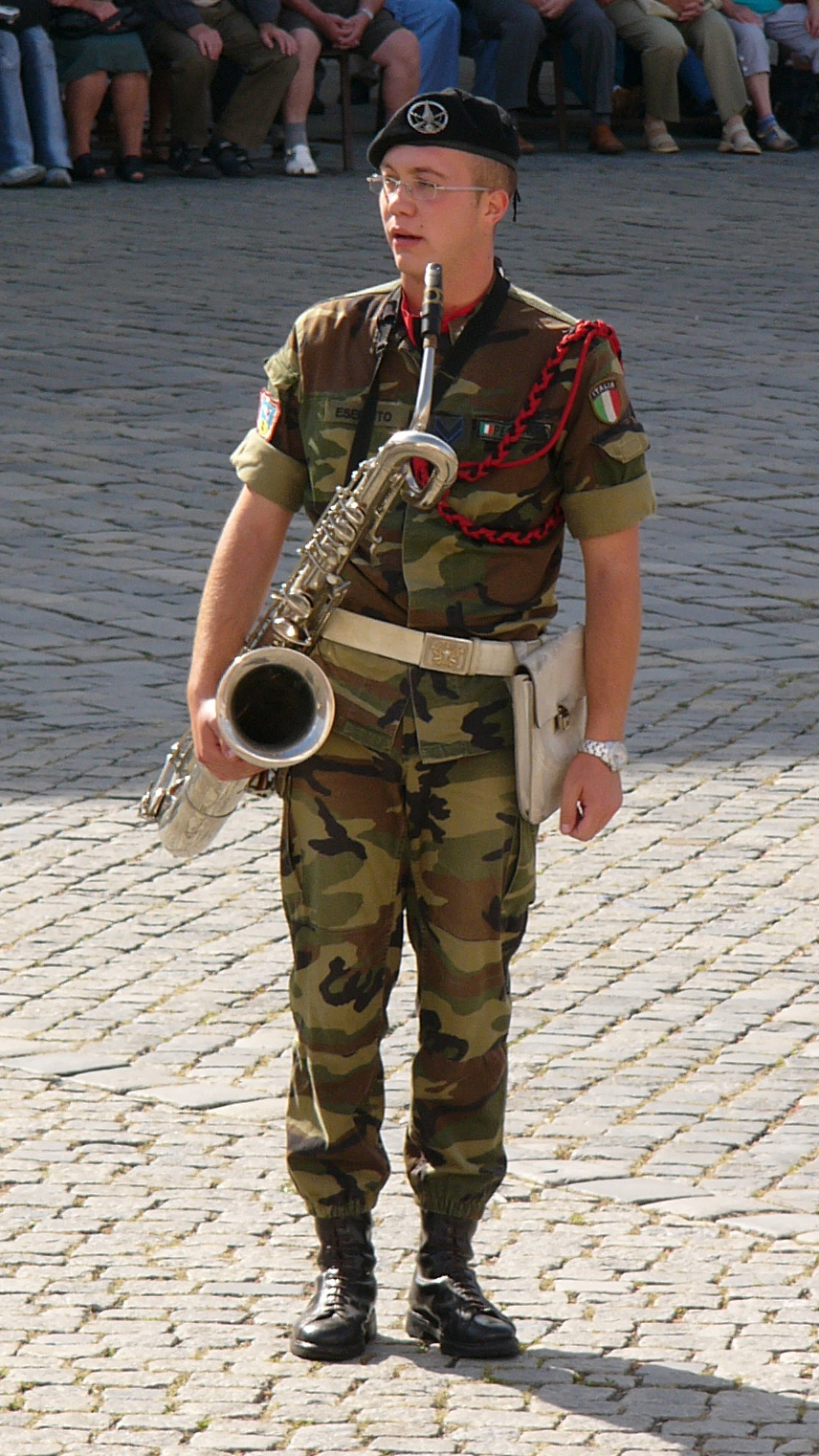
Baritone saxophonist in a military band of the Italian Army

The baritone sax is an important part of military bands and is common in musical theater. Horn sections with baritone saxophone were used on many rock-and-roll hits of the 1950s, several Motown hits of the 1960s featured baritone saxophonist Mike Terry, and the instrument continued to be used in horn sections in American rock and pop music. It is often in the horn sections of funk, blues, Latin, soul bands.

Prominent baritone saxophonists in contemporary American popular music include Stephen Kupka of Tower of Power, Dana Colley of Morphine, Leroi Moore of the Dave Matthews Band, John Linnell of They Might Be Giants and Martin Perna of Antibalas, the Dap-Kings and TV on the Radio.

Nigerian Afrobeat singer, musician, and bandleader Fela Kuti typically featured two baritone saxophone players in his band.

A few modern non-jazz artists have recently begun to incorporate saxophones into their instrumentation. The LA Indie rock band Fitz and the Tantrums featured both an alto and a baritone saxophone in their music—most recently their 2016 song "Handclap" from an album of the same name. Both were played by band member James King. The "Brass house" (experimental jazz/funk) group Too Many Zooz is another group that has popularized the baritone saxophone. Originally a New York City subway band, the trio has released three albums and been featured on a TEDxYouth@Budapest segment.

== In popular culture ==
Lisa Simpson from the cartoon comedy series The Simpsons plays the baritone sax.

Haruka Ogasawara from the anime Sound! Euphonium plays the baritone sax.
