= Nuclear Whales Saxophone Orchestra =

American saxophonist ensemble

The Nuclear Whales Saxophone Orchestra were a group of six American saxophonists who played as a saxophone ensemble in recordings and live performance. They were based in Santa Cruz, California and were active from about 1980 until some time in the 1990s.

The group was notable for its contrabass saxophone, which is 203 centimetres tall with a 43-centimetre-diameter bell. It is a very low-pitched instrument that is very rarely heard. The instrument, played by the group's leader and founder Don Stevens, was formerly owned by Robert Seaton of Louisville, Kentucky, a noted civil engineer and amateur musician who played the sax on radio station WHAS Big Band programs in the 1920s and 1930s. Seaton found the instrument in a shop in Newark, New Jersey in the 1960s. Inscriptions on it indicate that it was made for the United States Army Band in 1902. Seaton sold the instrument to the Nuclear Whales sometime before his death in 1990.

On September 29, 2003, the band played a concert at the concert hall of the National Library of China in Beijing. In 2002 they devised the concept of 500 saxophone players from the United States and abroad joining 500 Chinese saxophone players to play an event on the Great Wall of China. However, this has yet to occur, and it appears that the group has disbanded.

== Discography ==
- 1986 - Nuclear Whales
- 1989 - Whalin'
- 1991 - Thar They Blow
- 1992 -Gone Fission
- 1997 - Isotopia
- 1999 - Fathom This: A Retrospective
