= Paul Cohen (saxophonist) =

American saxophonist

Paul Cohen is an American saxophonist. He is active as a performer, teacher, historian, musicologist, and author in areas related to saxophone.

== Education ==
Cohen holds a Bachelor of Music degree from Baldwin-Wallace Conservatory of Music, and M.M. and D.M.A. degrees from the Manhattan School of Music.

== Performing career ==
He has appeared as soloist with orchestras including the San Francisco Symphony, New Jersey Symphony, Charleston Symphony, Richmond Symphony, Philharmonia Virtuosi and others. He has performed solo works of Jacques Ibert, Claude Debussy, Paul Creston, Alexander Glazunov, Charles Martin Loeffler, Karel Husa, Frank Martin, Ingolf Dahl, Henry Cowell, and Henri Tomasi.

He has performed with orchestras and chamber ensembles, including the New York Philharmonic, Metropolitan Opera, American Symphony Orchestra, San Diego Symphony, New York Solisti, Ohio Chamber Orchestra, Oregon Symphony, Cleveland Ballet, Group for Contemporary Music, NEP Symphony, Hudson Valley Saxophone Orchestra, Wayne Chamber Orchestra, Hartford Symphony, and the Long Island Philharmonic.

He has recorded three albums with the Cleveland Symphonic Winds, a CD of the music of Heitor Villa-Lobos with the Quintet of the Americas, plus recordings with the Saxophone Sinfonia, New York Solisti, Paul Winter Consort, North-South Consonance, and the New Sousa Band.

His most recent recordings include an environmental-jazz CD of solo improvisation as well as the newly discovered saxophone concerto of the 19th century American composer Caryl Florio. His latest CD, American Landscapes, includes three centuries of original American Music for saxophone, including works of Florio, Grainger, Siegmeister and Wilder.

== Teaching career ==
Cohen is currently on the faculties of the Manhattan School of Music, Mason Gross School of the Arts at Rutgers University, Columbia University, New York University, and Queens College. He previously taught at the Oberlin Conservatory.

In the 1980s he served on the staff of Lee Patrick's Saxophone Institutes held at the University of Louisville as a conductor and chamber music coach. He worked with Sigurd Raschèr at some of Raschèr's saxophone workshops in the 1990s. He currently hosts a week-long saxophone institute each summer in New York City or New Jersey.

== Saxophone research ==
Cohen has published numerous articles on saxophone literature and history in such noted publications as Saxophone Journal, the Clarinet and Saxophone Society Magazine of Great Britain, The Grainger Society Journal, the Saxophone Symposium, The Instrumentalist, and CBDNA Notes. Since 1985 he has authored the "Vintage Saxophones Revisited" column in Saxophone Journal.

He has more than 200 saxophones in his home saxophone museum, which includes numerous documents, photos, and memorabilia.

He has discovered and performed lost saxophone literature, including solo works for saxophone and orchestra by Loeffler, Caryl Florio and Ingolf Dahl, as well as rare chamber works by Grainger, Ornstein, Henry Cowell, Elie Siegmeister, and Loeffler. After finding a surviving set of parts in a reference library, Cohen restored and recorded the original uncut version of Ingolf Dahl's 1949 Concerto for Alto Saxophone and Wind Orchestra in its original concert band scoring. The piece went through several major revisions and re-scorings during Dahl's lifetime.

Cohen's publishing company, To the Fore Publishers, prints original, historical and contemporary saxophone works from a wide range of composers, in addition to Cohen's own arrangements and settings for saxophone ensemble. His collection of songs and dances transcribed for saxophone quartet, The Renaissance Book, is published by Galaxy Music.
