= Benedikt Eppelsheim =

German maker of wind instruments

Benedikt Eppelsheim (July 10, 1967 – April 4, 2023) was a German instrument designer and maker of extreme high- and low-voiced woodwind instruments. He lived in Munich, Germany and his workshop, Benedikt Eppelsheim Blasinstrumente, continues to produce instruments using his designs.

== Early life and training ==
Eppelsheim's father was a musicologist specializing in woodwind instruments. After graduating high school and doing community service, he learned brass instrument making from Ganter (Munich) and Wenzel Meinl (Geretsried). After two years at Münchner Blech GmbH, he wanted to turn his back on music and study architecture (his other childhood dream), but his limited talent in it and still burning interest in wind instruments pushed him back to the workbench.

At Münchner Blech GmbH he was able to work on bass and contrabass saxophones, as well as sarrusophones. In Franz Traut's workshop (Munich) he spent years experimenting with S-bows and repairing saxophones. During this time he built two experimental instruments that, although not interesting in themselves, were indispensable steps on the way to his own marketable developments.

== Benedikt Eppelsheim Wind Instruments ==
In 1998 he opened his own shop as a repair business in 1998. From here he developed new instruments of which he was both the inventor and exclusive manufacturer.

In 1999 he unveiled the tubax, a reproportioned contrabass saxophone. He also debuted the soprillo, a piccolo saxophone placed an octave above the B♭ soprano saxophone. His redesigned contrabass clarinet was launched in 2006.

In collaboration with Guntram Wolf, he developed the contraforte, an improved and redesigned contrabassoon. Through this time he also made bass and contrabass saxophones, sarrusophones, and a variety of uniquely designed instruments on special order.

== Death and continuity ==
Benedikt Eppelsheim's death was announced by his shop on April 5, 2023. The announcement included that he had not been involved in day-to-day operations for a time due to illness, that the shop would continue to operate under the direction of his successor, Johannes Belbo.

== See also ==
- Contrabass clarinet
- Subcontrabass saxophone
