= List of aerophones by Hornbostel–Sachs number =

The Hornbostel–Sachs system of musical instrument classification groups all instruments in which sound is produced through vibrating air. This can include a column of air being set in vibration (as in wind instruments) or an air-flow being interrupted by an edge (as in free-reeds). The instrument itself does not vibrate, and there are no vibrating strings or membranes.

== Aerophones (4) ==
=== Free aerophones (41) ===
Instruments where the vibrating air is not enclosed by the instrument itself.

- Bullroarer
- Siren (noisemaker)

==== Displacement free aerophones (411) ====
The air-stream meets a sharp edge, or a sharp edge is moved through the air. In either case, according to more recent views, a periodic displacement of air occurs to the alternate flanks of the edge. Examples are the swordblade or the whip.

- Swordblade
- Whip

==== Interruptive free aerophones (412) ====
The air-stream is interrupted periodically

412.1 Idiophonic interruptive aerophones or reeds - The air-stream is directed against a lamella, setting it in periodic vibration to interrupt the stream intermittently. In this group also belong reeds with a 'cover,' i.e. a tube in which the air vibrates only in a secondary sense, not producing the sound but simply adding roundness and timbre to the sound made by the reed's vibration; generally recognizable by the absence of fingerholes.

412.11 Concussion reeds - Two lamellae make a gap which closes periodically during their vibration.

412.12 Percussion reeds - A single lamella strikes against a frame.

412.121 Independent percussion reeds.

412.122 Sets of percussion reeds. - Earlier organs

412.13 Free-reed instruments feature a reed which vibrates within a closely fitting slot (there may be an attached pipe, but it should only vibrate in sympathy with the reed, and not have an effect on the pitch - instruments of this class can be distinguished from 422.3 by the lack of finger-holes).

412.131 Individual free reeds.

- Bawu
- Party horn
- Pitch pipe

412.132 Sets of free reeds.

- Accordica (mouth organ)
- Accordina (instrument)
- Accordion
- Accordola
- Accordolin (mouth organ)
- Bandoneon
- Bandonium
- Concertina
- Harmoneon
- Harmonica
- Harmonium
- Melodica
- Reed organ
- Sheng
- Vibrandoneon (instrument)
- Martinshorn

412.14 Band reed instruments - The air hits the sharp edge of a band under tension. The acoustics of this instrument have so far not been investigated.

412.2 Non-idiophonic interruptive instruments.

412.21. Rotating aerophones (the interruptive agent rotates in its own plane and does not turn on its axis)

- Siren

412.22. Whirling aerophones (the interruptive agent turns on its axis)

- Bullroarer
- Corrugaphone

==== Plosive aerophones (413) ====
The sound is caused by a single compression and release of air.

- Udu "drum" or kimkim
- Boomwhacker
- End-struck pipe-based instruments, variations on earlier known instruments recently popularized by Blue Man Group, in forms that they refer to as Tubulum, Drumbone, etc.

=== Non-free aerophones (wind instruments proper) (42) ===
The vibrating air is contained within the instrument. This group includes most of the instruments called wind instruments in the west, such as the flute or French horn, as well as many other kinds of instruments such as conch shells.

==== Edge-blown aerophones or flutes (421) ====
The player makes a ribbon-shaped flow of air with his lips (421.1), or his breath is directed through a duct against an edge (421.2).

- Flute

421.1 Flutes without duct - The player himself creates a ribbon-shaped stream of air with his lips.

421.11 End-blown flutes - The player blows against the sharp rim at the upper open end of a tube.

421.111 Individual end-blown flutes.

421.111.1 Open single end-blown flutes - The lower end of the flute is open.

421.111.11 Without fingerholes.

421.111.12 With fingerholes.

- Hocchiku
- Inci
- Palendag/Pulalu
- Shakuhachi
- Tumpong

421.111.2 Stopped single end-blown flutes - The lower end of the flute is closed.

421.111.21 Without fingerholes.

421.111.22 With fingerholes.

421.112 Sets of end-blown flutes or panpipes - Several end-blown flutes of different pitch are combined to form a single instrument.

- Pan pipes

421.112.1 Open panpipes.

421.112.11 Open (raft) panpipes - The pipes are tied together in the form of a board, or they are made by drilling tubes *in a board.

421.112.12 Open bundle (pan-) pipes - The pipes are tied together in a round bundle.

421.112.2 Stopped panpipes.

421.112.3 Mixed open and stopped panpipes.

421.12 Side-blown flutes - The player blows against the sharp rim of a hole in the side of the tube.

421.121 (Single) side-blown flutes.

421.121.1 Open side-blown flutes.

421.121.11 Without fingerholes.

421.121.12 With fingerholes.

- Western concert flutes.
- Piccolo

421.121.2 Partly stopped side-blown flutes - The lower end of the tube is a natural node of the pipe pierced by a small hole.

421.121.3 Stopped side-blown flutes.

421.121.31 Without fingerholes.

421.121.311 With fixed stopped lower end - (Apparently non-existent).

421.121.312 With adjustable stopped lower end

- Piston flutes

421.121.32 With fingerholes.

421.122 Sets of side-blown flutes.

421.122.1 Sets of open slide-blown flutes.

421.122.2 Sets of stopped side-blown flutes.

421.13 Vessel flutes (without distinct beak) The body of the pipe is not tubular but vessel-shaped

- Conch (instrument) (if played like a flute)
- Jug
- Xun.

421.2 Flutes with duct or duct flutes - A narrow duct directs the air-stream against the sharp edge of a lateral orifice

421.21 Flutes with external duct - The duct is outside the wall of the flute; this group includes flutes with the duct chambered in the wall under a ring-like sleeve and other similar arrangements.

421.211 (Single) flutes with external duct.

421.211.1 Open flutes with external duct.

421.211.11 Without fingerholes.

421.211.12 With fingerholes.

- Babarak
- Suling

421.211.2 Partly stopped flutes with external duct.

421.211.3 Stopped flutes with external duct.

421.212 Sets of flute with external duct.

421.22 Flutes with internal duct - The duct is inside the tube. This group includes flutes with the duct formed by an internal baffle (natural node, bock of resin) and an exterior tied-on cover (cane, wood, hide).

421.221 (Single) flutes with internal duct.

421.221.1 Open flutes with internal duct.

421.221.11 Without fingerholes

- Whistle
- Willow flute

421.221.12 With fingerholes

- Recorder
- Khloy
- Khlui
- Tin whistle

421.221.2 Partly stopped flute with internal duct.

421.221.3 Stopped flutes with internal duct.

421.221.31 Without fingerholes.

421.221.311 With fixed stopped lower end.

421.221.312 With adjustable stopped lower end.

- Slide whistle

421.221.31 With fingerholes.

421.221.4 Vessel flutes with duct.

421.221.41 Without fingerholes.

421.221.42 With fingerholes.

- Huaca
- Ocarina

421.222 Sets of flutes with internal duct.

421.222.1 Sets of open flutes with internal duct.

421.222.11 Without fingerholes - Open flue stops of the organ.

- Calliope
- Flue pipe of an organ

421.222.12 With fingerholes

- Double flageolet.

421.222.2 Sets of partly stopped flutes with internal duct.

421.222.3 Sets of stopped flutes with internal duct.

==== Reed aerophones (422) ====
The player's breath is directed against a lamella or pair of lamellae which periodically interrupt the airflow and cause the air to be set in motion.

422.1 Double reed instruments - There are two lamellae which beat against one another.

422.11 (Single) oboes.

422.111 With cylindrical bore

- Cornamuse
- Crumhorn
- Hirtenschalmei

422.111.1 Without fingerholes.

422.111.2 With fingerholes.

422.112 With conical bore

- Oboe
  - Musette (modern small oboe in e♭)
  - Oboe d'amore
  - Cor anglais / English horn (same instrument)
  - Oboe da caccia
  - Bass oboe / Baritone oboe (same instrument)
  - Heckelphone
- Bassoon
  - Tenoroon
  - Contrabassoon
- Bombarde
- Cromorne
- Sarrusophone
  - Sopranino sarrusophone
  - Soprano sarrusophone
  - Alto sarrusophone
  - Tenor sarrusophone
  - Baritone sarrusophone
  - Bass sarrusophone
  - Contrabass sarrusophone
- Shawm
- Surma
- Tarogato (traditional))
- Bagpipes:
  - Cornemuse du Centre
  - Great Highland Bagpipe
  - Uilleann pipes
  - Northumbrian smallpipes
  - Musette de cour
  - Biniou
  - Gaita
  - Dudelsack
  - Volynka

422.12 Sets of oboes.

422.121 With cylindrical bore.

422.122 With conical bore.

422.2 Single reed instruments - The pipe has a single 'reed' consisting of a percussion lamella.

422.21 (Single) clarinets.

422.211 With cylindrical bore.

422.211.1 Without fingerholes.

422.211.2 With fingerholes.

- Clarinets
  - Piccolo clarinet in A♭
  - Sopranino clarinet (in E♭ or D))
  - Soprano clarinet (in C, B♭, or A)
  - Basset clarinet (in A or G)
  - Basset-horn
  - Alto clarinet
  - Bass clarinet
  - Contra-alto clarinet
  - Contrabass clarinet
  - Octocontra-alto clarinet
  - Octocontrabass clarinet
- Bagpipes:
  - Duda
  - Swedish bagpipes
  - Zampogna
  - (see also main article "Types of bagpipes" for many others)
- Experimental:
  - Folgerphone

422.212 With conical bore.

- Octavin
- Saxophone
  - Soprillo (sopranissimo saxophone)
  - Sopranino saxophone
  - Soprano saxophone in B♭ or C
  - Conn-o-sax
  - Mezzo-soprano saxophone in F
  - Alto saxophone
  - C melody saxophone
  - Tenor saxophone
  - Baritone saxophone
  - Bass saxophone
  - Contrabass saxophone
  - Subcontrabass saxophone
  - Tubax
- Sneng
- Tarogato (modern)

422.22 Sets of clarinets.

- Zummara (Double Clarinet)

422.3 Reedpipes with free reeds - The reed vibrates through [at] a closely fitted frame. There must be fingerholes, otherwise the instrument belongs to the free reeds 412.13.

422.31 Single pipes with free reed.

422.32 Double pipes with free reeds.

==== Trumpets (labrosones) (423) ====
The player's vibrating lips set the air in motion.

423.1 Natural trumpets - There are no means of changing the pitch apart from the player's lips.

- Natural trumpet

423.11 Conches - A conch shell serves as trumpet.

423.111 End-blown.

423.111.1 Without mouthpiece.

- Conch shell (if played like a trumpet)

423.111.2 With mouthpiece.

423.112 Side-blown.

423.12 Tubular trumpets.

423.121 End-blown trumpets - The mouth-hole faces the axis of the trumpet.

423.121.1 End-blown straight trumpets - The tube is neither curved nor folded.

423.121.11 Without mouthpiece.

- Didgeridoo

423.121.12 With mouthpiece.

- Alphorn
- Trembita

423.121.2 End-blown horns - The tube is curved or folded.

423.121.21 Without mouthpiece.

- Shofar

423.121.22 With mouthpiece.

- Bugle
- Lur
- Natural horn
- Vuvuzela
- Post Horn

423.122 Side blown trumpets.

423.2 Chromatic trumpets - The pitch of the instrument can be altered mechanically

423.21 Keyed trumpets

- Cornett (or Cornetto)
- Serpent, and later derivatives:
  - Upright serpent
  - Basson Russe
  - English bass horn
  - Cimbasso (early)
- Keyed bugle
- Keyed trumpet
- Ophicleide

423.22 Slide trumpets

- Bazooka
- Sackbut
- Trombone

423.23 Valved trumpets

423.231 Conical bore

- Tuba
- Euphonium
- Sousaphone
- Helicon
- Flugelhorn

423.232 Semi-conical bore

- Cornet
- Horn
- Mellophone
- Tenor Horn
- Baritone horn
- Wagner tuba

423.233 Cylindrical bore

- Trumpet
- Valve trombone
- Cimbasso (modern)
