= Tenor sarrusophone =

Tenor member of the sarrusophone family of wind instruments

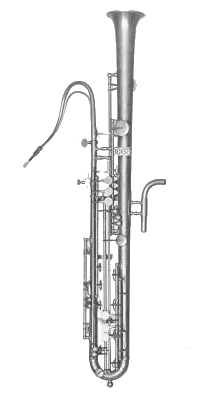
- Tenor sarrusophone in B♭, Metropolitan Museum of Art, New York

Woodwind instrument
- Classification: Wind; Aerophone
- Hornbostel–Sachs classification: 422.112 (Double reed aerophone with keys)
- Inventor(s): Pierre-Auguste Sarrus (concept); Pierre-Louis Gautrot (patent)
- Developed: Mid 19th century

Playing range
- Tenor sarrusophone in B♭ sounds a major ninth lower than written.

Related instruments
- Bass oboe; Heckelphone; Lupophon; Tenoroon; Rothphone; Tenor saxophone

Builders
- Orsi (on request) Historical: Couesnon & Co.; Evette & Schaeffer; Gautrot; Orsi

More articles or information
- Sarrusophones: Soprano; Alto; Tenor; Baritone; Bass; Contrabass

The tenor sarrusophone is the tenor member of the sarrusophone family of metal double reed wind instruments, pitched in B♭ with the same range as the tenor saxophone. They were originally made in the late 19th and early 20th century by Orsi, Gautrot and his successor Couesnon, and Evette & Schaeffer (now Buffet Crampon). Currently they are made only by Orsi on special order.

== See also ==
- Sarrusophone
- Tenor saxophone
