= Bass sarrusophone =

Low-pitched member of the sarrusophone family of wind instruments

- Bass sarrusophone in B♭, c. 1900

Woodwind instrument
- Classification: Wind; aerophone
- Hornbostel–Sachs classification: 422.112 (Double-reed aerophone with keys)
- Inventors: Pierre-Auguste Sarrus (concept); Pierre-Louis Gautrot (patent)
- Developed: Mid-19th century

Playing range
- Bass sarrusophone in B♭ sounds two octaves and a major second lower than written.

Related instruments
- Bassoon; bass saxophone

Builders
- Orsi (on request) Historical: Couesnon & Co.; Evette & Schaeffer; Gautrot; Orsi

More articles or information
- Sarrusophones: Soprano; alto; tenor; baritone; bass; contrabass

The bass sarrusophone is the bass member of the sarrusophone family of metal double-reed conical-bore wind instruments. Pitched in the key of B♭, it has a range almost identical to the bass saxophone and can cover the bassoon range up to F_{4}.

Historically, it was built in the late 19th and early 20th centuries principally by its inventor Pierre-Louis Gautrot and his successor, Couesnon & Co., as well as Evette & Schaeffer and Orsi of Milan. It is currently only available by custom order from Orsi.

There is very little repertoire specifically for bass sarrusophone; Roupen Shakarian has written a piece for it called "Sarruso Rex".
