= Alto sarrusophone =

High pitched member of the sarrusophone family of wind instruments

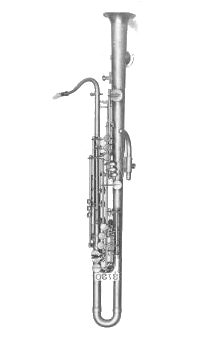
- Alto sarrusophone in E♭, Metropolitan Museum of Art, New York

Woodwind instrument
- Classification: Wind; Aerophone
- Hornbostel–Sachs classification: 422.112 (Double reed aerophone with keys)
- Inventor(s): Pierre-Auguste Sarrus (concept); Pierre-Louis Gautrot (patent)
- Developed: Mid 19th century

Playing range
- Alto sarrusophone in E♭ sounds a major sixth lower than written.

Related instruments
- Alto saxophone; Cor anglais; Oboe

Builders
- Eppelsheim; Orsi (on request); Historical: Couesnon & Co.; Evette & Schaeffer; Gautrot; Orsi

More articles or information
- Sarrusophones: Soprano; Alto; Tenor; Baritone; Bass; Contrabass

The alto sarrusophone is the alto member of the sarrusophone family of metal double reed instruments. Pitched in E♭, its body is folded only once, and has a bocal that resembles the neck of a tenor saxophone.

Historically it was built in the late 19th and early 20th centuries principally by its inventor, Parisian instrument maker Pierre-Louis Gautrot and his successor, Couesnon & Co., as well as Evette & Schaeffer (now Buffet Crampon) and Romeo Orsi of Milan. It is currently only available by custom order, from Orsi or German instrument maker Benedikt Eppelsheim.
