= Soprano sarrusophone =

High-pitched member of the sarrusophone family of wind instruments

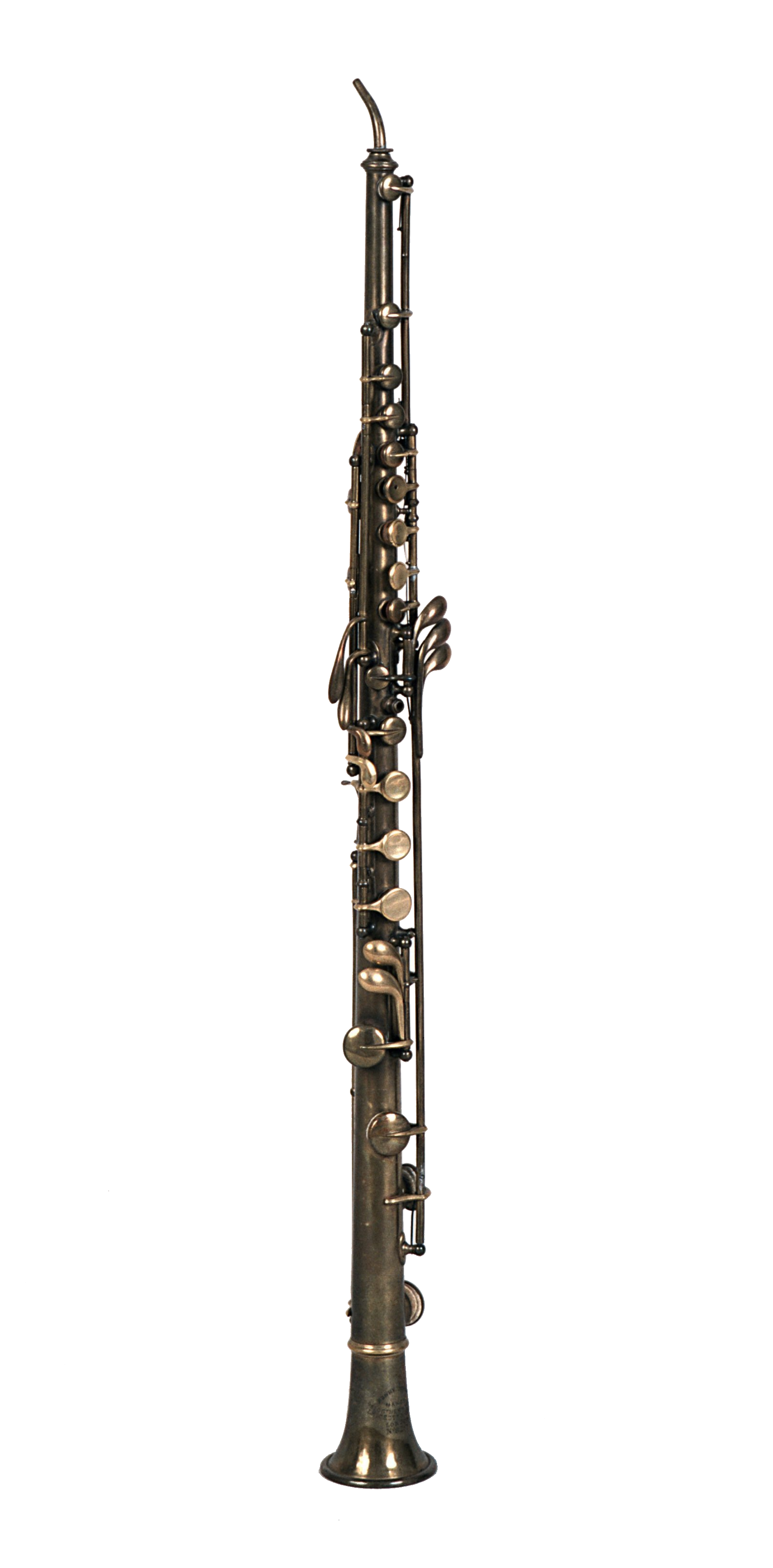
- Soprano sarrusophone by Distin, c. 1865

Woodwind instrument
- Classification: Wind; aerophone
- Hornbostel–Sachs classification: 422.112 (Double-reed aerophone with keys)
- Inventors: Pierre-Auguste Sarrus (concept); Pierre-Louis Gautrot (patent)
- Developed: Mid-19th century

Playing range
- The soprano sarrusophone in B♭ sounds a major second lower than written.

Related instruments
- Oboe; soprano saxophone

Builders
- Orsi (on request) Historical: Couesnon & Co.; Distin & Co.; Evette & Schaeffer; Gautrot; Orsi

More articles or information
- Sarrusophones: Soprano; alto; tenor; baritone; bass; contrabass

The soprano sarrusophone is a high-pitched member of the sarrusophone family of keyed metal conical-bore double-reed instruments. It is pitched in B♭ with approximately the same range as the soprano saxophone. The timbre is similar to that of the oboe, although louder and less refined, more like a shawm. Although used in wind bands in the late 19th and early 20th centuries, it is today extremely rare, as few original specimens survive. They were made in the late 19th and early 20th century principally by their inventor, the Parisian instrument maker Pierre-Louis Gautrot, and his successor, Couesnon & Co.. Instruments are also known from manufacturers Evette & Schaeffer, Distin & Co. of London, and Orsi of Milan. New instruments can still be made individually to order from Orsi.
