= Baritone sarrusophone =

Low-pitched member of the sarrusophone family of wind instruments

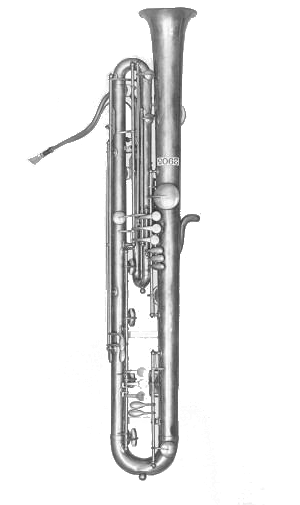
- Baritone sarrusophone in E♭, Metropolitan Museum of Art, New York

Woodwind instrument
- Classification: Wind; Aerophone
- Hornbostel–Sachs classification: 422.112 (Double reed aerophone with keys)
- Inventor(s): Pierre-Auguste Sarrus (concept); Pierre-Louis Gautrot (patent)
- Developed: Mid 19th century

Playing range
- Baritone sarrusophone in E♭ sounds an octave and a major sixth lower than written.

Related instruments
- Bass oboe; Heckelphone; Lupophon; Bassoon; Baritone saxophone

Builders
- Orsi (on request); Eppelsheim; Historical: Couesnon & Co.; Evette & Schaeffer; Gautrot; Orsi

More articles or information
- Sarrusophones: Soprano; Alto; Tenor; Baritone; Bass; Contrabass

The baritone sarrusophone is the baritone member of the sarrusophone family of metal double reed conical bore wind instruments. Sometimes colloquially known as the combat bassoon, it is pitched in E♭ and has the same range as the baritone saxophone, and is about the same height as a bassoon. Its body is wrapped around only once, whereas the contrabass sarrusophone wraps around twice.

Historically it was built in the late 19th and early 20th centuries principally by its inventor, Parisian instrument maker Pierre-Louis Gautrot and his successor, Couesnon & Co., as well as Evette & Schaeffer and Italian manufacturer Orsi of Milan. The sarrusophone family was conceived to replace oboes and bassoons in military and marching bands, where their metal construction was more durable and easier heard in outdoor settings.

It is currently only made to order, by Orsi and the German instrument maker Benedikt Eppelsheim.

== See also ==
- Sarrusophone
