= Contrabass sarrusophone =

Lowest of the sarrusophone family of wind instruments

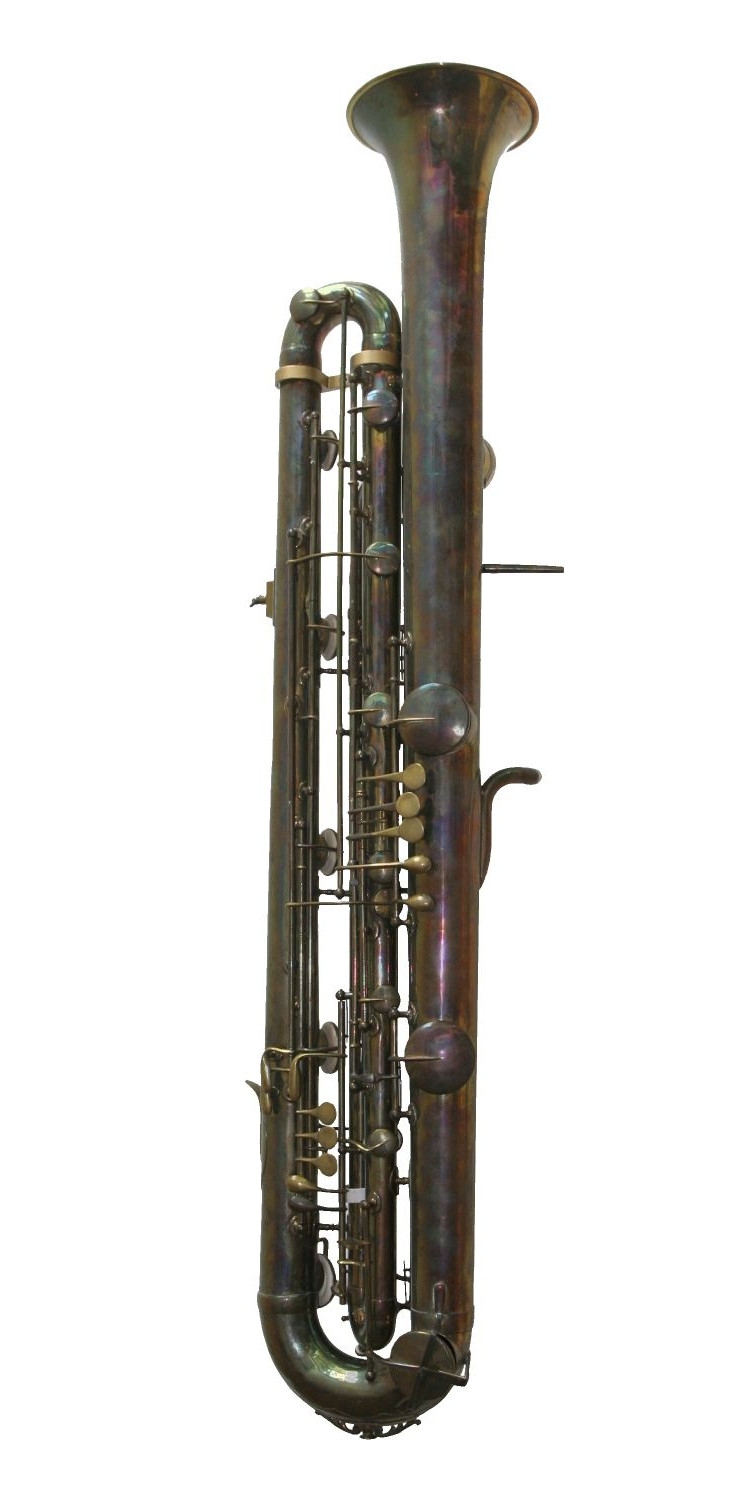
- Contrabass sarrusophone in E♭

Woodwind instrument
- Classification: Wind; Aerophone
- Hornbostel–Sachs classification: 422.112 (Double reed aerophone with keys)
- Inventors: Pierre-Auguste Sarrus (concept); Pierre-Louis Gautrot (patent)
- Developed: Mid 19th century

Playing range
- The contrabass sarrusophone sounds two octaves and a major sixth (E♭) or three octaves and a second (B♭) lower than written; the contrabass in C is written in bass clef and sounds an octave lower.

Related instruments
- Contrabassoon; Contraforte; Reed contrabass

Builders
- Orsi (on request); Eppelsheim (C only); Historical: Conn (E♭ only); Couesnon & Co.; Evette & Schaeffer; Gautrot; Orsi

More articles or information
- Sarrusophones: Soprano; Alto; Tenor; Baritone; Bass; Contrabass

The contrabass sarrusophone is the largest and lowest-sounding member of the sarrusophone family, built in three sizes pitched in E♭, C, or B♭. It was made in the 19th and early 20th centuries primarily in France by its inventor, the Parisian instrument maker Pierre-Louis Gautrot, his successor Couesnon & Co., and Evette & Schaeffer. It was also made in Italy by Milan manufacturers Romeo Orsi and Rampone & Cazzani, and in the United States by C. G. Conn, who built instruments in E♭ for US military bands. Romeo Orsi and the German instrument maker Benedikt Eppelsheim make individual contrabass sarrusophones on request.

== Tone ==
The E♭ sarrusophone has the tone of a reedy contrabass saxophone, while the C sarrusophone sounds much like the contrabassoon. The B♭ contrabass sarrusophone is the lowest of the sarrusophones, and was the lowest-pitched wind instrument until the invention of the E♭ octocontra-alto and the B♭ octocontrabass clarinets, and the B♭ subcontrabass tubax.

The E♭ and B♭ sarrusophones are transposing instruments.

The contrabass sarrusophone is sometimes confused with the reed contrabass, to which it bears a superficial resemblance.

== Reed ==
Contrabass sarrusophones take rather large reeds; they are larger than contrabassoon reeds. This leads to most people making their own reeds (as is the practice of most oboe and bassoon players). Contrabass sarrusophone reeds are still manufactured by Vandoren. Sarrusophones are traditionally played with a double reed, but single reed mouthpieces have also been used. These mouthpieces are similar in size to soprano or alto saxophone mouthpieces.

== Size ==
Contrabass sarrusophones are comparatively light for contrabass instruments, weighing only about as much as a baritone saxophone, and being approximately four feet tall, about the same height as a bass saxophone. This makes them more convenient to hold, play and transport.

== Use ==
=== Classical ===
The sarrusophone is rarely scored in classical music today, but there are a few examples. Pieces written for it include Percy Grainger's Over the Hills and Far Away, Paderewski's "Polonia" Symphony in B minor, which called for three E♭ contrabass sarrusophone players, Maurice Ravel's Rapsodie Espagnole, Sheherazade and L'heure espagnole, and Arrigo Boito's Nerone. Paul Dukas also used it in his orchestral tone poem The Sorcerer's Apprentice. Claude Debussy includes the C instrument in Jeux, as does Frederick Delius in Eventyr, Songs of Sunset, and his Requiem. Jules Massenet writes for it in Esclarmonde. The instrument is given notable solos in Arnold Bax's Symphony No. 1, written in 1921–22. Igor Stravinsky's first fully serial work, Threni (1958), a symphonic/choral setting of passages from the Latin Vulgate of the Book of Lamentations, includes a sarrusophone in its unusual scoring, which also features a solo Flugelhorn. American composer Barney Childs composed a chamber work, The Golden Bubble (1967), for E♭ contrabass sarrusophone and one percussionist. Kaikhosru Shapurji Sorabji frequently utilized the contrabass sarrusophone, calling for it in his 1st, 4th, and 8th piano concertos, Opus clavisymphonicum for piano and orchestra, his two symphonies, and the Messa grande sinfonica.

=== Jazz ===
The song "Mandy Make Up Your Mind" recorded in 1924 with Clarence Williams and Louis Armstrong features an extended solo by Sidney Bechet on E♭ sarrusophone and continues to feature him for approximately the last half of the song. On Frank Kimbrough’s 2018 album Monk's Dreams: The Complete Compositions of Thelonious Sphere Monk Scott Robinson plays contrabass sarrusophone on the tracks “Misterioso” and “Straight No Chaser”.
