= List of woodwind instruments =

Some musicologists count free-reed instruments separately.

== Flutes ==
- Fife
- Piccolo
- Western concert flute
- Alto flute
- Bass flute
- Contra-alto flute
- Contrabass flute
- Subcontrabass flute
- Double contrabass flute
- Hyperbass flute
- Native American flute
- Irish flute
- Bansuri (India)
- Kōauau (New Zealand)
- Koudi (China)
- Dizi (China)
- Daegeum (Korea)
- Nguru (New Zealand)
- Nohkan (Japan)
- Ryūteki (Japan)
- Shinobue (Japan)
- Švilpa (Lithuania)
- Venu (India)
- Kaval (Anatolian-Turkic, Bulgaria, Macedonia)
- Fyell (Albanian Polla)
- Ney (Anatolian-Turkic)
- Danso (Korea)
- Hocchiku (Japan)
- Hun (Korea)
- Palendag (Philippines)
- Panflute (Greece)
- Suling (Indonesia/Philippines)
- Tumpong (Philippines)
- Xiao (China)
- Xun (China)
- Khlui (Thailand)
- Matófono (Argentina/Uruguay)

=== Notched ===
- Quena (South America)
- Shakuhachi (Japan)

=== Internal Duct (fipple) ===
- Almpfeiferl (Austria)
- Caval (Romania)
- Diple (or Dvojnice, a double recorder) (Serbia)
- Flageolet (France)
- Fluier (Romania)
- Frula (Serbia, Bosnia & Hercegovina, Croatia)
- Furulya (Hungary)
- Gemshorn (Germany)
- Ocarina (South America, England, China, and various other countries)
- Organ pipe The pipes of the church/chamber organ are actually fipple flutes.
- Recorder (General)
- Tin Whistle (Pennywhistle) (Ireland)
- Shvi (Armenia)
- Dilli Kaval (Turkey)

=== Overblown ===
- Fujara (Slovakia)
- Futujara

== Single reed ==
- Alboka (Basque Country, Spain)
- Arghul (Egypt and other Arabic nations)
- Aulochrome
- Chalumeau
- Clarinet
  - Piccolo (or sopranino, or octave) clarinet
  - Sopranino clarinet (including E-flat clarinet)
  - Soprano clarinet
  - Saxonette
  - Basset clarinet
  - Clarinette d'amour
  - Basset horn
  - Alto clarinet
  - Bass clarinet
  - Contra-alto clarinet (E♭ contrabass clarinet)
  - Contrabass clarinet
  - Octocontra-alto clarinet
  - Octocontrabass clarinet
- Diplica (Baranya)
- Double clarinet
- Heckel-clarina
- Heckelphone-clarinet
- Hornpipe
- Launeddas (Sardinia)
- Manzello
- Mijwiz (Arabic nations)
- Octavin
- Pibgorn
- Saxophone
  - Soprillo
  - Sopranino saxophone
  - Soprano saxophone
  - Mezzo-soprano saxophone
  - Alto saxophone
  - Tenor saxophone
  - C melody saxophone
  - Baritone saxophone
  - Bass saxophone
  - Contrabass saxophone
  - Subcontrabass saxophone
  - Tubax
- Sipsi
- Sneng
- Stritch
- Tárogató (after 1890)
- Xaphoon
- Zhaleika

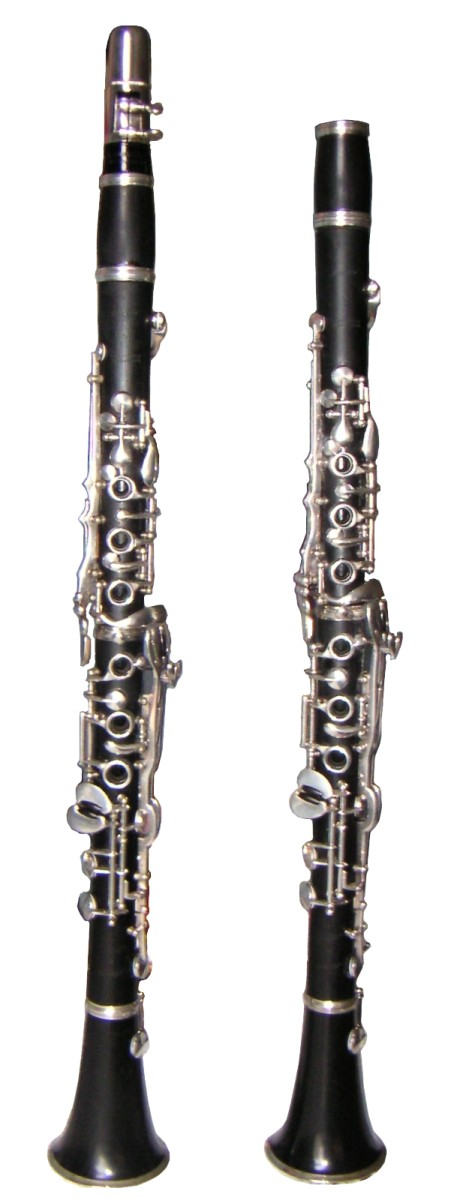
Two soprano clarinets: a B^{♭} clarinet (left) and an A clarinet (right). These use the Oehler system of keywork.

== Double-reed ==
- Algaita
- Aulos
- Balaban (instrument) (Azerbaijan)
- Bassanelli
- Bassoon
  - Soprano bassoon
  - Tenoroon
  - Contrabassoon
- Biforaers (Sicily)
- Bombardeers (France)
- Catalan shawm
- Cromorne (French baroque, different from the crumhorn)
- Contra Forte
- Duduk (Armenia)
- Dulcian
- Dulzaina (Spain)
- Heckelphone
  - Piccolo heckelphone
- Hichiriki (Japan)
- Kèn bầu (Vietnam)
- Mizmar (Arabic nations)
- Nadaswaram
- Oboe
  - Piccolo oboe
  - Oboe d'amore
  - Cor anglais (i.e. English horn)
  - Oboe da caccia
  - Bass oboe
  - Contrabass oboe
- Piri (Korea)
- Pommer (Europe)
- Rackett (Europe)
- Reed contrabass/Contrabass à anche
- Rhaita (North Africa)
- Rothphone
- Sarrusophone (but often played with single reed mouthpiece)
- Shawm (Schalmei)
- Sopilas (Croatia)
- Sornas (Persia)
- Suona (China)
- Surnayers (Iran)
- Taepyeongso (Korea)
- Tárogatós (Hungary; up to about the 18th century)
- Tromboon
- Trompeta china (Cuba)
- Zurla (Macedonia)
- Zurna

=== Capped ===
- Bagpipes (see Types of bagpipes)
- Cornamuse
- Crumhorn
- Hirtenschalmei
- Kortholt
- Rauschpfeife

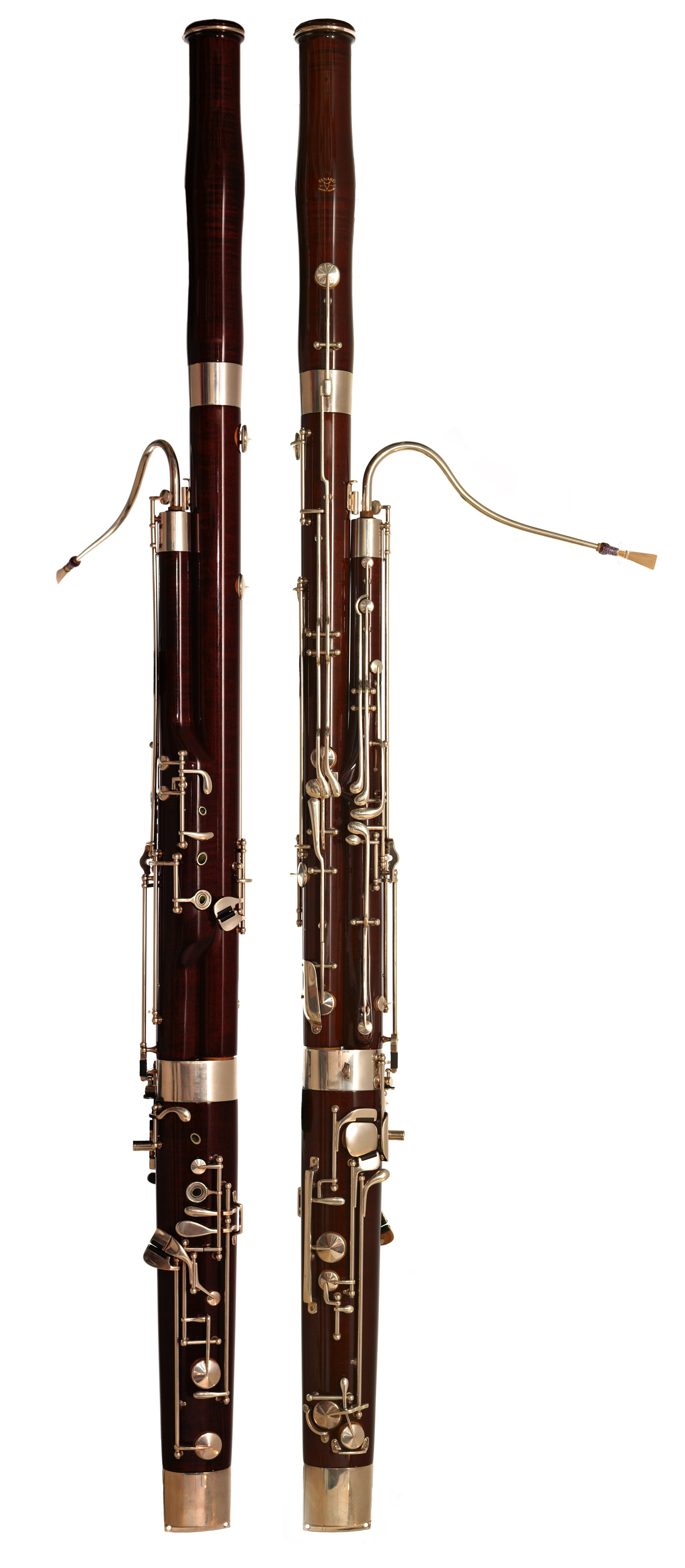
A Fox Instruments bassoon.

== Triple reed ==
- Hne (Myanmar)

== Quadruple reed ==
- Pi (Thailand)
- Shehnai (India)
- Sralai (Cambodia)
