= Lists of musical instruments by Hornbostel–Sachs number =

Orchestra

The Hornbostel–Sachs system categorizes musical instruments by how they make sound. It divides instruments into five groups: idiophones, membranophones, chordophones, aerophones, and electrophones. A number of instruments also exist outside the five main classes.

== Main categories ==
- List of idiophones by Hornbostel–Sachs number
  - See also: List of percussion instruments
- List of membranophones by Hornbostel–Sachs number
- List of chordophones by Hornbostel–Sachs number
- List of aerophones by Hornbostel–Sachs number
  - See also: List of woodwind instruments

=== Electrophones ===
Electrophones are instruments in which sound is generated by electrical means. While it is not officially in any published form of the Hornbostel–Sachs system, and hence, lacking proper numerical subdivisions, it is often considered a fifth main category.

- Croix Sonore
- Denis d'or
- Drum machine
- Hammond organ
- Keyboard bass
- Kraakdoos (or Cracklebox)
- Mellotron
- Ondes Martenot
- Synclavier
- Synthesizer
- Tannerin (a.k.a. Electro-Theremin)
- Telharmonium
- Theremin

== Instruments that do not fit into any of the above five categories ==
A number of instruments neither fit wholly into any one of the above 5 categories, nor can they be properly described as belonging to some combination of these categories. Within the Hornbostel Sachs system they therefore do not have a number (hence the label NaN = Not a Number).

=== Hydraulophones ===
The first three Hornbostel Sachs numbers describe instruments that make sound from matter in its solid state. The fourth HS number describes instruments that make sound from matter in its gaseous state (air). The fifth HS number describes instruments that make sound from electricity and/or electrical energy.

A number of instruments have been invented, designed, and made, that make sound from matter in its liquid state. This class of instruments is called hydraulophones. Hydraulophones use an incompressible fluid, such as water, as the initial sound-producing medium, and they may also use the hydraulic fluid as a user-interface.

=== Plasmaphones ===
Another category of instruments has been invented that use matter in higher energy states, such as plasma, to produce the initial sound. These instruments are called plasmaphones. As flame is matter in a high energy state the class comprises the much older pyrophones.

=== Non-electrophonic quintephones ===
A number of computational musical instruments that are not electrophones have been invented, designed, built, and used in performances. These instruments are sound synthesizers that use mechanical, optical, or other forms of non-electric computation, sampling, processing, or the like.

It has been proposed that music synthesizers that perform computation, and/or that work by recording and playback of sound samples, or the like, be referred to as quintephones. This class of instrument includes electrophones as a special case.
