= Sarrus =

Sarrus is a surname. Notable people with the surname include:

- Jean Sarrus (1945–2025), French actor, composer, and singer
- Pierre-Auguste Sarrus (1813–1876), French musician and inventor
  - Sarrusophone, a musical instrument
- Pierre Frédéric Sarrus (1798–1861), French mathematician
  - Sarrus linkage, a mechanical linkage
