= Szopelka =

A szopelka is a Russian double reed wind instrument, similar in form to the zurna. Typically, the instrument is 15 inches (38 cm) long, with a brass mouthpiece and a wooden body with fifteen finger holes, eight large and seven small.
