= Bariton =

Bariton may refer to:

- Baryton, a string instrument
- Baritone (French: baryton; German: Bariton; Italian: baritono) is most commonly the type of male voice that lies between bass and tenor.
- Baritone guitar, a six string electric guitar tuned in a low B instead of E.
- Baritone horn, a member of the brass family of instruments

== See also ==
- Baritone (disambiguation)
