= Rothphone =

Narrow-bore family of double-reed metal wind instruments

- Fratelli A. M. Bottali rothphone in C, c. 1912

Woodwind instrument
- Other names: Rothophone; rothaphone; saxsarrusophone
- Classification: Wind; aerophone
- Hornbostel–Sachs classification: 422.112 (Double-reeded aerophone with keys)
- Inventor: Friedrich Roth
- Developed: Late 19th century in Italy

Playing range
- The range of a rothphone is the same as a corresponding sarrusophone or saxophone and is notated in treble clef.

Related instruments
- Sarrusophone; saxophone

Builders
- Bottali; Orsi

The rothphone (German: Rothphon, Italian: ròthfono; also rothophone, rothaphone, or saxsarrusophone) is a metal double-reed conical-bore wind instrument similar to the sarrusophone but built with a saxophone shape.

== History ==
The rothphone was invented by Friedrich Roth, who initially named it the rothcorno. It was primarily manufactured as the rothfono by Bottali in Milan, when they took over the Roth workshop in 1898. Like the sarrusophone, it was intended to replace oboes and bassoons in military bands.

The rothphone gained some popularity in Italian wind and military bands between World War I and World War II but remained almost completely unknown outside Italy. When Bottali folded in the mid-1930s and was taken over by the Milan instrument manufacturer Orsi, Orsi sold their stock of Bottali-made rothphone instruments as the "saxrusofono".

== Construction ==
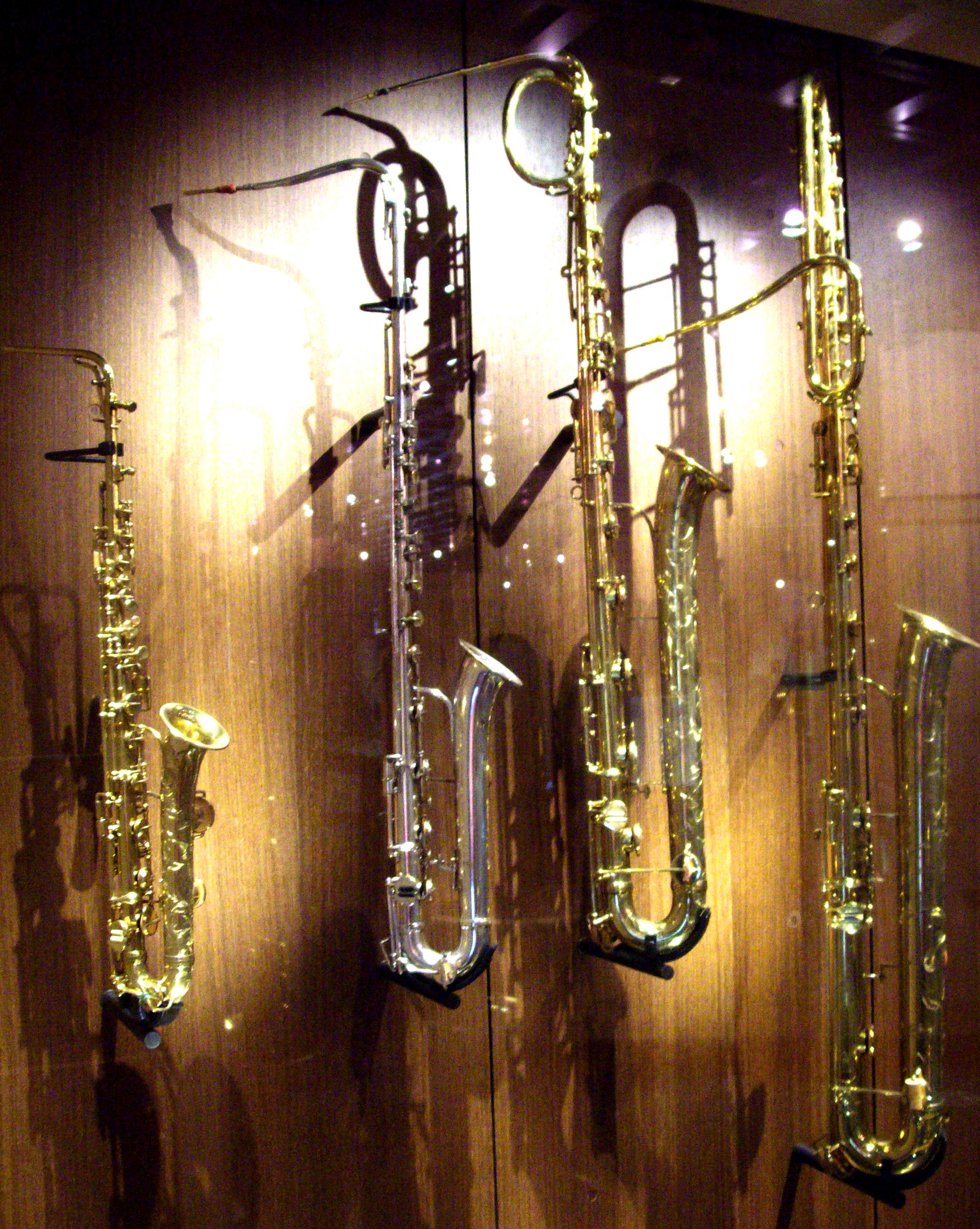
Rothphones; left to right: alto, tenor, baritone and bass

Rothphones were patented and introduced in five sizes in 1912 by Bottali, their only significant manufacturer:

- Soprano rothphone in B♭
- Alto rothphone in E♭
- Tenor rothphone in B♭
- Baritone rothphone in E♭
- Bass rothphone in B♭

Each instrument corresponded in range to the similar-sized sarrusophone or saxophone and all are transposing instruments notated in treble clef. A contrabass size was never built due to the similarity to the already established contrabass sarrusophone in bands of the time. For the same size of instrument, the bore of the rothphone is similar to the sarrusophone and narrower than the saxophone.
