= Sarrusophone =

Family of metal double-reed wind instruments

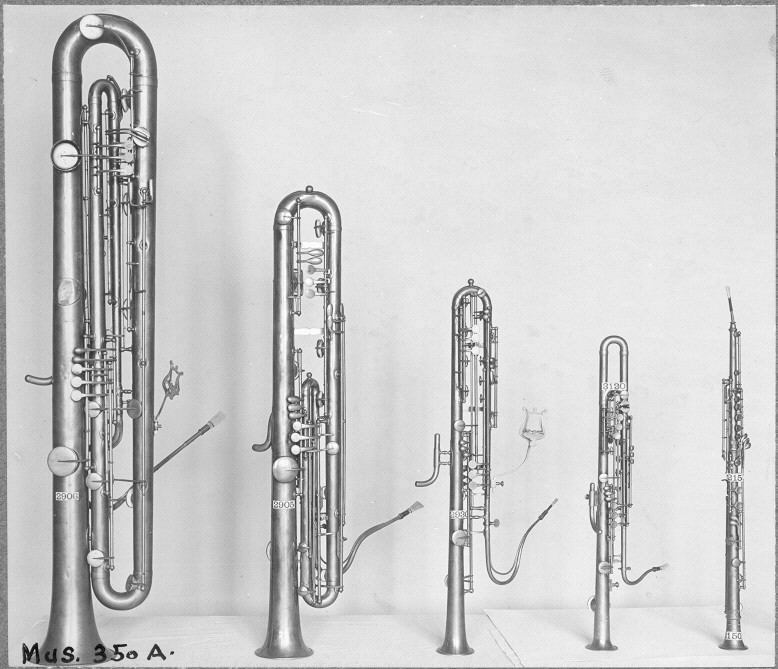
- Sarrusophone family; left to right: E♭ contrabass, B♭ bass, B♭ tenor, E♭ alto, B♭ soprano.

Woodwind instrument
- Classification: Wind; aerophone
- Hornbostel–Sachs classification: 422.112 (Double-reed aerophone with keys)
- Inventors: Pierre-Auguste Sarrus (concept); Pierre-Louis Gautrot (patent)
- Developed: Mid-19th century

Playing range
- Written range of a sarrusophone; all (except the C contrabass) are transposing instruments notated in treble clef.

Related instruments
- Oboe; bassoon; contrabassoon; saxophone; reed contrabass; rothphone

Builders
- C. G. Conn (contrabass only); Couesnon & Co.; Evette & Schaeffer; Gautrot; Orsi

More articles or information
- Sizes: Soprano; alto; tenor; baritone; bass; contrabass

The sarrusophone is a type of metal double-reed conical-bore woodwind instrument patented and first manufactured by the French instrument maker Pierre-Louis Gautrot in 1856. Gautrot named the sarrusophone after the French bandmaster Pierre-Auguste Sarrus (1813–1876), whom he credited with the concept of the instrument, though it is not clear whether Sarrus benefited financially. The instruments were intended for military bands, to serve as replacements for oboes and bassoons which at the time lacked the carrying power required for outdoor marching music. Although originally designed as double-reed instruments, single-reed mouthpieces were later developed for use with the larger bass and contrabass sarrusophones.

== Sizes and ranges ==
The sarrusophone was manufactured in the following sizes and had the following theoretical ranges:

- E♭ sopranino: B♭_{3}–G_{6} (sounding D♭_{4}–B♭_{6})
- B♭ soprano: B♭_{3}–G_{6} (sounding A♭_{3}–F_{6})
- E♭ alto: B♭_{3}–G_{6} (sounding D♭_{3}–B♭_{5})
- B♭ tenor: B♭_{3}–G_{6} (sounding A♭_{2}–F_{5})
- E♭ baritone: B♭_{3}–G_{6} (sounding D♭_{2}–B♭_{4})
- B♭ bass: B♭_{3}–G_{6} (sounding A♭_{1}–F_{4})
- E♭ contrabass: B♭_{3}–G_{6} (sounding D♭_{1}–B♭_{3})
- C contrabass: B♭_{1} or C_{2}–G_{4} (sounding B♭_{0} or C_{1}–G_{3})
- B♭ contrabass: B_{3}♭–G_{6} (sounding A♭_{0}–F_{3})

All sarrusophones are transposing instruments notated in treble clef, except the C contrabass which is notated in bass clef and sounds an octave lower, like the contrabassoon. The sarrusophone has a very similar written range to the saxophone; the lowest note is the same written B♭_{3} below middle C_{4} (two instruments made by Benedikt Eppelsheim, a singular alto and baritone, have extra keys that extend to low G), and the keywork usually allows a practical range to high G_{6}.

Until the turn of the 21st century, the B♭ contrabass had the distinguishing feature of being the lowest pitched reed instrument ever placed in production, since it is capable of producing a low A♭_{0}, one semitone below A_{0}, the lowest note of both the piano and a contrabassoon (with a low A key). Both the B♭ subcontrabass saxophone, first built in 2010, and the Eppelsheim B♭ tubax, a similar hybrid saxophone introduced ten years earlier, also have A♭_{0} as their lowest pitch. Leblanc also made prototype subcontrabass clarinets in the 1930s that could go even lower—the E♭ octocontra-alto to E♭_{0} and the B♭ octocontrabass to C_{0}—but neither model went into production, and the prototypes reside at the Leblanc Musée des instruments à vent in France.

== Construction ==
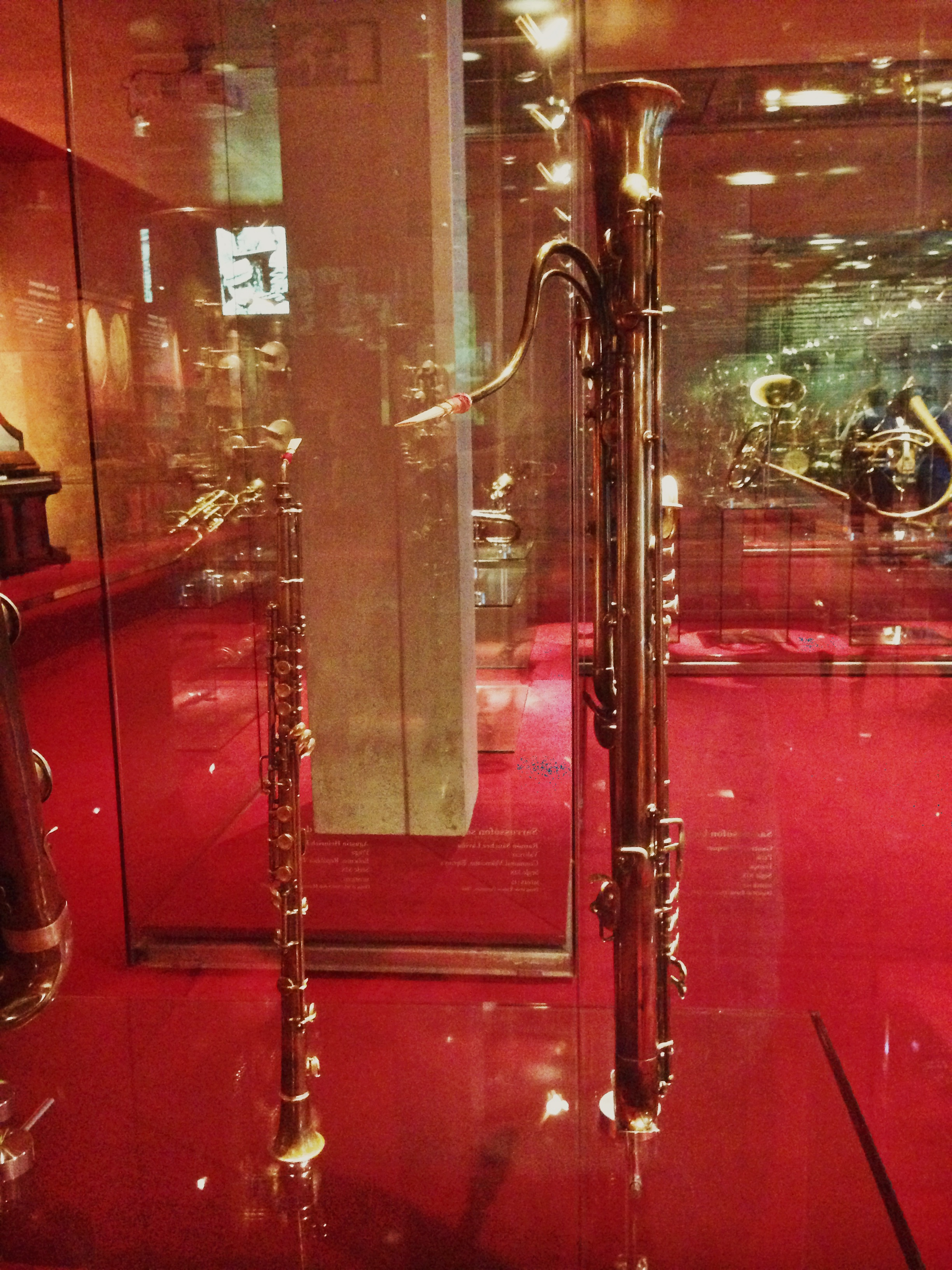
B♭ soprano (left) and B♭ bass sarrusophones at the Museu de la Música de Barcelona

All members of the sarrusophone family are made of metal, with a conical bore, and the larger members of the family resemble the ophicleide in shape. Like the oboe and bassoon, all sizes of sarrusophone were originally designed to be played with a double reed. Later, single-reed mouthpieces were developed which resemble alto or soprano saxophone mouthpieces. It is unclear if these were available for all sizes of the sarrusophone family, the most common examples being for the E♭ contrabass. Approximate reed measurements (in millimetres) for certain sarrusophones, expressed as "tip width, distance from tip to first wire, overall length", are as follows:

- Soprano (9, 20, 50)
- Alto (13, 25, 55)
- Tenor (15, 27, 60)
- Baritone (17, 32, 70)
- Bass (19, 40, 80)
- Contrabass in E♭ or C (22, 44, 85)

The fingering of the sarrusophone is nearly identical to that of the saxophone. This similarity caused Adolphe Sax to file and lose at least one lawsuit against Gautrot, claiming infringement upon his patent for the saxophone. Sax lost on the grounds that the tone produced by the two families of instruments is markedly different, despite their mechanical similarities. However, because the sarrusophone never gained wide acceptance, makers were not inclined to develop its mechanism to the same extent as that of the saxophone.

Features of the sarrusophone's mechanism generally include:

- Non-automatic octave keys (necessary to produce the "standard" top 4th of its range). From sopranino through bass, two octave keys. The contrabasses (and perhaps some basses) have three, the 3rd key being used for the notes D and E♭ directly above the octave break, only.
- No articulated G♯, bis B♭, F♯ trill keys or 1/1 and 1/2 B♭ as found on the saxophone. The top and bottom key stacks are not linked. Surprisingly though, a B to C trill key as found on the saxophone did more or less become standard.
- The key for low B♭ is activated by the left thumb as opposed to the left little finger as on the saxophone.
- A key for rapid alternation across the C to D break. This key can also be used to play high D as well. This may be taken to be an equivalent of the high-D palm key of a saxophone, although on the sarrusophone the location of the touchpiece varies.
- No palm keys for playing the top range. Using the non-automatic register keys, 3rd overtones are easily available, rendering palm keys unnecessary. The relatively narrow bore of the sarrusophone also aids in the rendering of these 3rd harmonics.

On earlier instruments, the use of rollers on the low E♭ and C keys seems to have been more common than having them on the G♯, low C♯, and B keys. Additionally on some instruments made by Buffet in the early 20th century, the G♯ key is "semi-articulated" so that a G to G♯ trill can be made by an additional touchpiece for the right hand. Saxophones of this time period also have this mechanism. Additionally, there is no connection from G♯ to low C♯ or low B, which is also identical to how saxophones were constructed at that time.

== Musical style ==
=== Classical orchestra ===
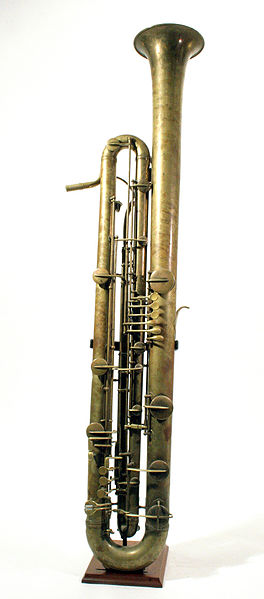
C. G. Conn contrabass sarrusophone, c. 1920–1925. Conn began making E♭ contrabass sarrusophones in 1921; about 300 were made in total, about half for the U.S. Army Quartermaster Corps.

The sarrusophone is rarely called for in orchestral music. However, around the turn of the 20th century, the contrabass sarrusophones in E♭ and C enjoyed a vogue, the latter as a substitute for the contrabassoon (the French model patterned after the German Heckel model, having been introduced later around 1906 by Buffet et al.) so that it is called for in, for example, Jules Massenet's Esclarmonde (1889), Visions (1891), and Suite parnassienne (1912); Maurice Ravel's Shéhérazade overture (1898), Rapsodie espagnole (1907), and L'heure espagnole (1907–09); Ignacy Jan Paderewski's Symphony in B minor "Polonia" (1903–08; 3 sarrusophones are called for); Frederick Delius's Requiem (1913–16) and Songs of Sunset (1906–07); Claude Debussy's Jeux (1913); Lili Boulanger's Psalm 129 (1916) and Psalm 130 (1917); and Arrigo Boito's Nerone (1924). Igor Stravinsky included a part for contrabass sarrusophone in Threni. The composer Paul Dukas used the contrabass sarrusophone to great effect in 1897 in his The Sorcerer's Apprentice.

These parts are now normally played on the contrabassoon, although there are early 20th century recordings of at least some of these pieces where sarrusophones can be heard. In general, the term "sarrusophone" usually refers to the E♭ contrabass which appears to have been made in larger numbers than any other size. Although the C contrabass sarrusophone, with its range down to B♭_{0} identical to the contrabassoon, was perhaps envisioned for these and other orchestral works, only relatively few instruments were ever made and were most likely to become the property of orchestras or opera companies. The E♭ contrabass with D♭_{1} as its lowest note lacks the lowest three notes of the contrabassoon.

The E♭ contrabass has also been used as an alternative to the E♭ contrabass saxophone, which due to its large size is impractical in many musical situations, especially marching bands.

The English composer Kaikhosru Shapurji Sorabji used the contrabass sarrusophone in various of his orchestral works.

=== Concert band ===
In the concert band literature, Percy Grainger used the E♭ contrabass in the original scoring of his piece "Children's March: Over the Hills and Far Away". In early 20th century Italian band scores, parts for the B♭ tenor, E♭ baritone, and B♭ bass sarrusophones, as well as the contrabass, are common. It appears that higher members of the sarrusophone family were not as popular as the lower members, with the sopranino in E♭ along with its distant cousin, the high E♭ oboe, being particularly rare. For the most part, the use of the sarrusophone was primarily in France, Italy, and Spain. During or after World War I, U.S. Military personnel noted the use of the contrabass sarrusophone in French military bands and, thereafter, commissioned the U.S. firm C. G. Conn to manufacture the E♭ contrabass for use in U.S. military bands beginning in approximately 1921, as per Conn's advertising of the time. The instrument was offered for sale to the general public as well, but production appears to have ceased in the 1930s. Conns as late as 1936 are known to exist. Beginning in 1921, the John Philip Sousa band used the Conn sarrusophone for an unknown period of time. In 1908, when Thomas Beecham wished to perform the work "Apollo and the Seaman" by the British composer Joseph Holbrooke (who had included parts for several sizes of sarrusophones), the sarrusophone parts had to be played by performers brought over from France. Paderewski included three E♭ contrabass sarrusophones in his Symphony in B Minor ("Polonia").

Frank Zappa used the E♭ contrabass sarrusophone in his scores for "Think It Over", "Big Swifty", "Ulterior Motive", "The Adventures of Greggery Peccary", "For Calvin", "Waka/Jawaka", and many others. These pieces can be found on his albums "Waka/Jawaka", "The Grand Wazoo", and "Zappa/Wazoo". The sarrusophone parts were played by Earl Dumler. In 2013, Franklin Stover composed a Concerto Breve for E♭ contrabass sarrusophone and winds.

=== Jazz ===
A very unusual example of the sarrusophone in jazz is by the Clarence Williams Blue 5 on a 1924 recording of "Mandy, Make Up Your Mind", with the sarrusophone played by the jazz soprano saxophone and clarinet virtuoso Sidney Bechet. One can conjecture that the sarrusophone played was most likely a contrabass with a single reed mouthpiece, as Bechet was not a trained double-reed player. Bechet later denied having ever played the sarrusophone. According to the biography by Chilton, Sidney "pulled a face" when asked about the solo on "Mandy", though he did not deny playing it.

In the 1970s and 1980s, the American jazz musician Gerald Oshita (based in Chicago and the San Francisco Bay Area and associated with Roscoe Mitchell) played avant-garde jazz on an E♭ contrabass manufactured by Conn. More recently (1990–2006), recordings using sarrusophone have been released by saxophonists Scott Robinson, Lenny Pickett, James Carter, and Paul Winter.

=== Rock and Roll ===
In rock music, They Might Be Giants used the sarrusophone in their song "Older" on the album Mink Car.

== Present status ==
Today, the sarrusophone is used in a handful of symphonic wind ensembles and as a novelty instrument on occasions. There appears to be a resurgence of interest in the instrument and there are amateur players (mostly of the E♭ contrabass). Bruce Broughton made extensive use of a contrabass sarrusophone in his score for the film Tombstone.

The tone of the sarrusophone is less clear but much reedier than that of the saxophone. In humorous terms, the sarrusophone can be said to sound rather "industrial" or perhaps "unrefined". Historically, the Orsi Instrument Company, Rampone (later Rampone & Cazzani), Buffet (under the ownership of Evette & Schaeffer), C. G. Conn (E♭ contrabass only), Gautrot, and Couesnon (Gautrot's successor) were the best known and possibly, only makers that produced in quantity.

The somewhat harsh tone quality of the sarrusophone and the need for a double reed may have contributed to it not becoming a standard member of wind bands. Additionally, although originally intended to replace the oboe and the bassoon, the practical ranges of the corresponding sarrusophones, the soprano and bass, as per famed band conductor Edwin Franko Goldman and organologist Anthony Baines, did not lend themselves to proper playing of oboe and bassoon parts, especially in orchestra transcriptions for wind band.

The need for a contrabass-pitched woodwind has existed since at least the 19th century. During the 19th century and into the 20th, there were sporadic attempts by Sax, Buffet, Besson, and others to build a successful contrabass clarinet in either E♭ or B♭. In the early 1930s, upon the suggestion of the American Bandmasters Association, the French firm Selmer Paris succeeded when they introduced their E♭ contrabass model (the popular E♭ and B♭ contrabass models by the French firm LeBlanc not being placed into production until the late 1940s, although invented earlier). It can be conjectured that the compactness and musical qualities of these instruments may have contributed to the non-use of the sarrusophone, as they are now very uncommon in musical circles and tend to be hard to find or acquire. Currently there are no companies replacing lost or destroyed instruments, making existing examples rare.

== Rothphone ==
Fratelli A. M. Bottali rothphone in C, c. 1912

The rothphone, also known as the rothophone or saxarrusophone, is a sarrusophone hybrid that is rewrapped into the shape of a saxophone. It was introduced in Italy around 1900 and intended to replace the oboes and bassoons in military bands, but found little acceptance and remained unknown outside Italy. They were built in sizes from soprano to bass, with narrower, less tapered conical bores than either saxophones or sarrusophones.

As per advertising of the time, the well-known American saxophone manufacturer Buescher imported a number of these instruments into the United States during the late 1920s or early 1930s, perhaps as an answer to C. G. Conn's production of the contrabass sarrusophone. Per advertisements for this instrument and photos that have appeared in books, the lowest note on the Rothphone is a low B natural, not low B♭ as with the saxophone and sarrusophone. In the 1930s, the band at the University of Illinois under Austin Harding had a full sarrusophone section from soprano to E♭ contrabass that included at least the tenor rothphone. However, this appears to have been an isolated use of the instrument.
