= Baritone (disambiguation) =

Baritone is a type of classical male singing voice whose vocal range lies between the bass and the tenor voice type

Baritone may also refer to:

== Brass and woodwind instruments ==
- Baritone horn, a low-pitched brass instrument in the saxhorn family
- Baritone saxophone, one of the largest members of the saxophone family
- Hautbois baryton, or baritone oboe, also called the bass oboe
- Baritone sarrusophone, a double reed instrument

== String instruments ==
- Baritone guitar, a guitar with a longer scale length
- Baritone ukulele
- a possible alternate spelling of baryton, a stringed musical instrument
- Baritone violin, with the same tuning as a cello but larger in size

== Other uses ==
- Bass-baritone, a low baritone with notes in the bass range
