= Schäferpfeife =

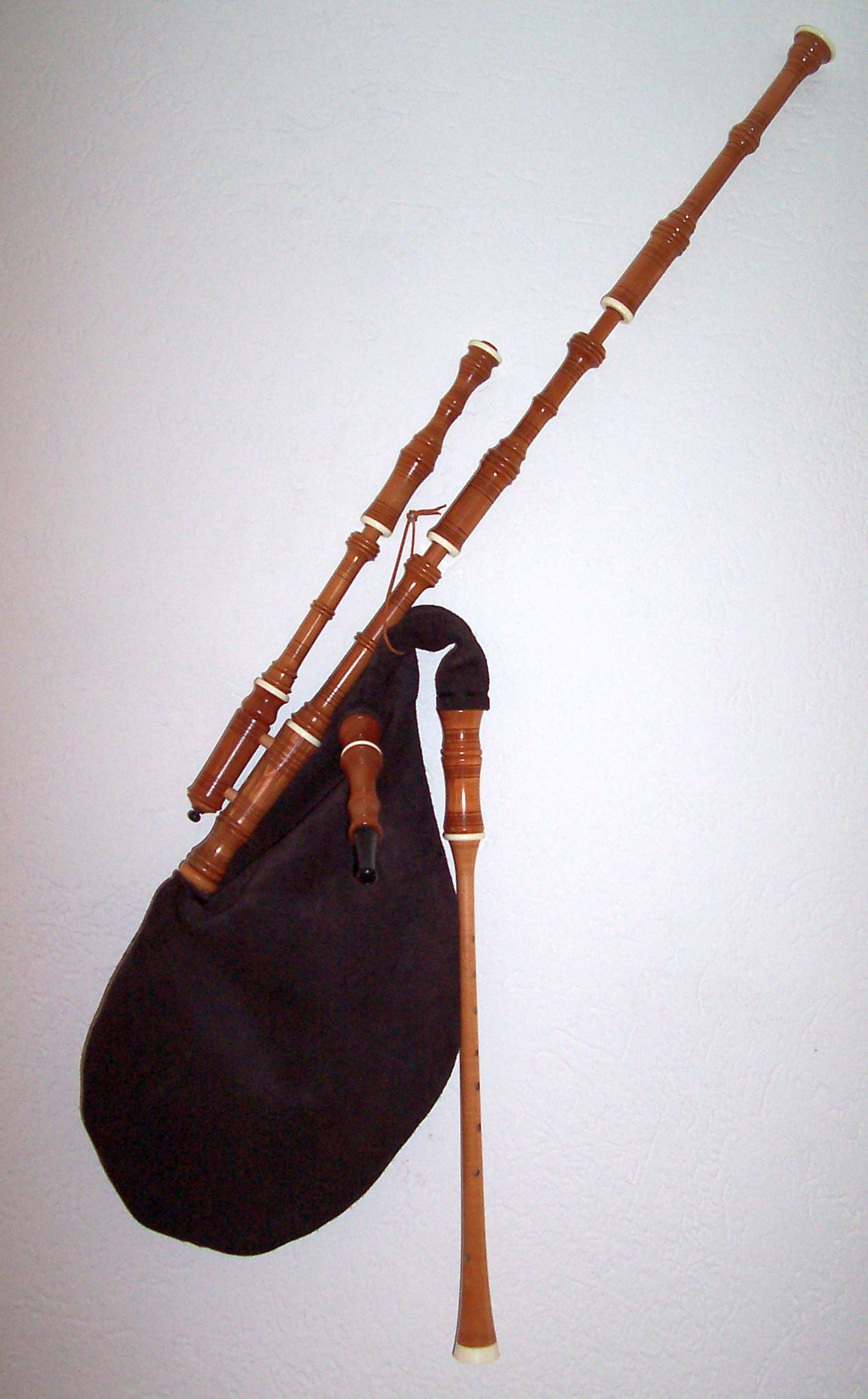
Schäferpfeife in G/C

The Schäferpfeife ('Shepherd's Whistle'), also known as the Sackpfeife, is a type of German bagpipe, characterised by two forward-facing drones in a common stock.

Single drone pipes appeared in Germany in the Late Middle Ages, and double drone pipes became more common by the 16th century. They remained popular throughout southern the regions of modern German and Austria until the mid-18th century, although surviving examples are rare. Leopold Mozart featured bagpipes in his Sinfonia in D major ("Peasant Wedding").

A common term for bagpipes in German is Dudelsack. In Flemish, this bagpipe is also known as schäferpfeife or Doedelzak, as it is similar in appearance. The Flemish pipes have fifth or octave drones, and the fingering system is nowadays generally identical to that of the French Cornemuse du Centre, as this fingering system is very stable in tone throughout the 1.5 octave range of the pipes.

The closing chorus of J. S. Bach's so-called Peasant Cantata (1742) is Wir gehn nun, wo der Dudelsack, in unsrer Schenke brummt ('We go now where the Dudelsack drones on our chest').
