= Reed contrabass =

Low-pitched double-reed musical instrument

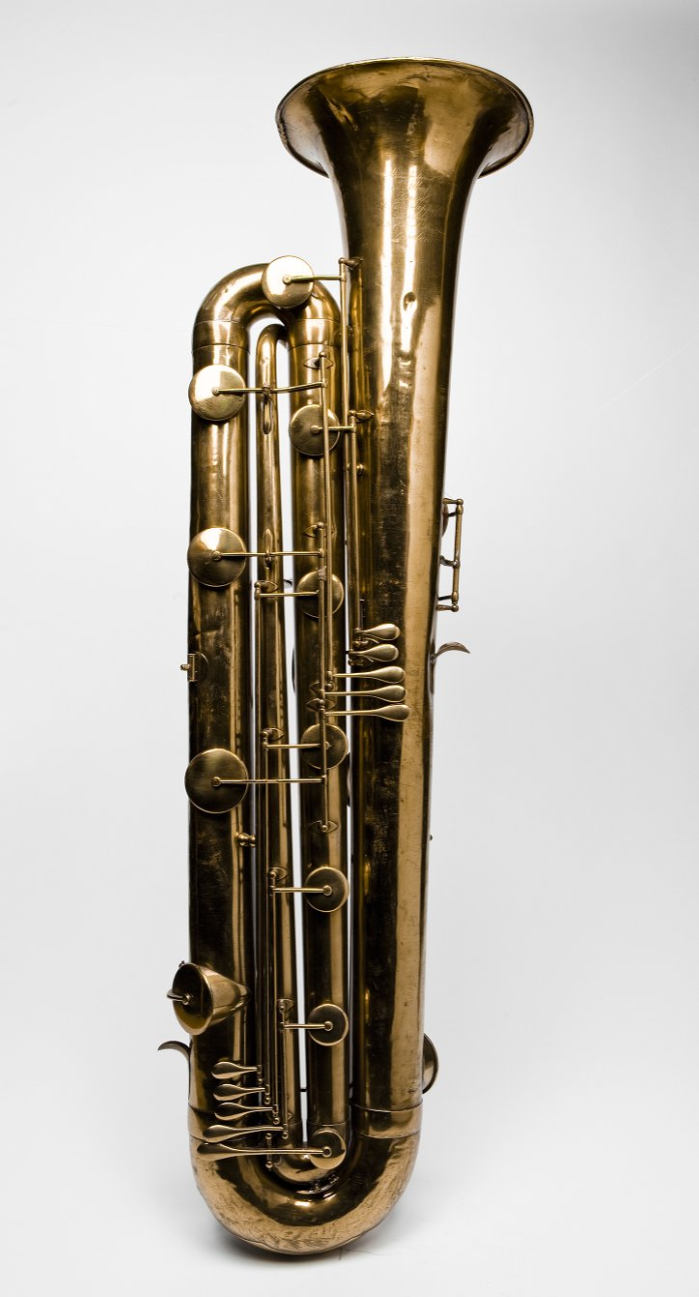
Reed contrabass by J. Albert, Brussels, late 19th century

The reed contrabass (Italian: contrabbasso ad ancia; French: contrebasse à anche) is a metal double reed woodwind instrument in the bass-contrabass register, pitched in C. Although the bassoon-like double reed and metal construction make it superficially similar to a contrabass sarrusophone, it is descended from the ophicleide which it resembles in appearance, as well as in the arrangement of the simpler key work and fingering.

== History ==
The first reed contrabass was Czech maker Červený's Kontrafagott aus Metall design of 1856, which he also called the Tritonicon. It was further developed by the Belgian maker Mahillon, who in 1868 produced the contrebasse à anche for military bands in France and Italy. It was one of several attempts at the time to create a woodwind instrument in the contrabass register, attempts that would eventually lead to the contrabassoon by the turn of the 20th century. The reed contrabass is still played in Italy today.

== Construction ==
The instrument is typically of metal construction, with a conical and unusually wide bore. This width allows each note to be produced by opening only one tone hole, whereas, in other woodwind instruments, several tone holes must be opened to produce most notes (for this reason, all keys but that for the lowest note remain normally closed). This property greatly simplifies the fingering of the instrument, in that no alternative fingerings for individual notes or trill keys are needed, nor exist. The lowest note that the reed contrabass may typically achieve is D1 (DD) - the lowest D on a standard grand piano.

Although obscure, the instrument may still be procured on request from the Italian instrument manufacturer Orsi. The reed contrabass is sometimes confused with the contrabass sarrusophone, to which it bears some superficial resemblance.
