= Mouthpiece (woodwind) =

Musical instrument part

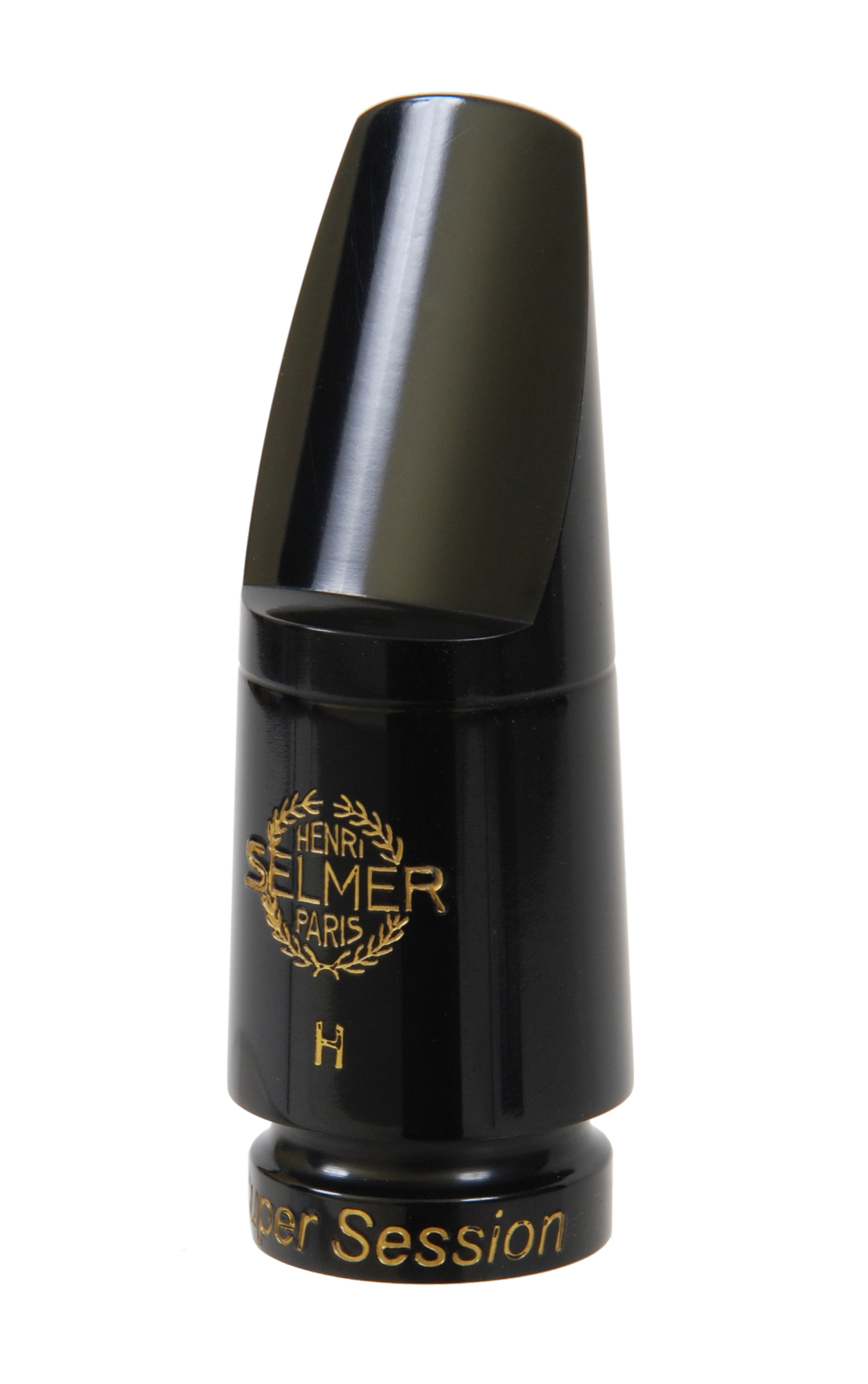
Soprano saxophone mouthpiece

The mouthpiece of a woodwind instrument is that part of the instrument which is placed partly in the player's mouth. Single-reed instruments, capped double-reed instruments, and fipple flutes have mouthpieces while exposed double-reed instruments (apart from those using pirouettes) and open flutes do not. The characteristics of a mouthpiece and reed can play a significant role on the sound of the instrument.

== Single-reed instruments ==
On single-reed instruments, such as the clarinet and saxophone, the mouthpiece is that part to which the reed is attached. Its function is to provide an opening through which air enters the instrument and one end of an air chamber to be set into vibration by the interaction between the air stream and the reed. Single-reed mouthpieces are basically wedge shaped, with the reed placed against the surface closest to the player's lower lip (the table). The player's breath causes the reed to vibrate. The reed beats against the mouthpiece, and in turn causes the column of air inside the instrument to vibrate. The top half to three-quarters of the table is open to the inside of the mouthpiece.

As with the brass instruments, the shape of the interior of the mouthpiece can greatly affect the sound of the instrument. Mouthpieces with a large, rounded chamber will produce a quite different sound from one with a small or square chamber.

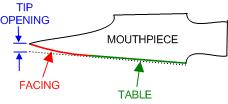
Parts of a woodwind mouthpiece

The distance between the tip of the mouthpiece and the tip of the reed is known as the tip opening. The tip opening has little effect on tone, which is more affected by the design of the mouthpiece's chamber (interior space).

The facing (or lay) is a curved section that leaves the flat table and continues to the tip of the mouthpiece. The length of a facing—defined as the distance from the tip of the mouthpiece to the point where the reed and mouthpiece meet—can vary. Different facing lengths have different response properties.

The reed is held tightly against the mouthpiece by a ligature. Anything that can hold the reed on the mouthpiece may serve as a ligature. Commercial ligatures are commonly made of metal or plastic. Some players (including many German clarinetists) prefer string or a shoelace, which is wrapped around the reed and the mouthpiece, to commercially manufactured ligatures.

=== Clarinets ===
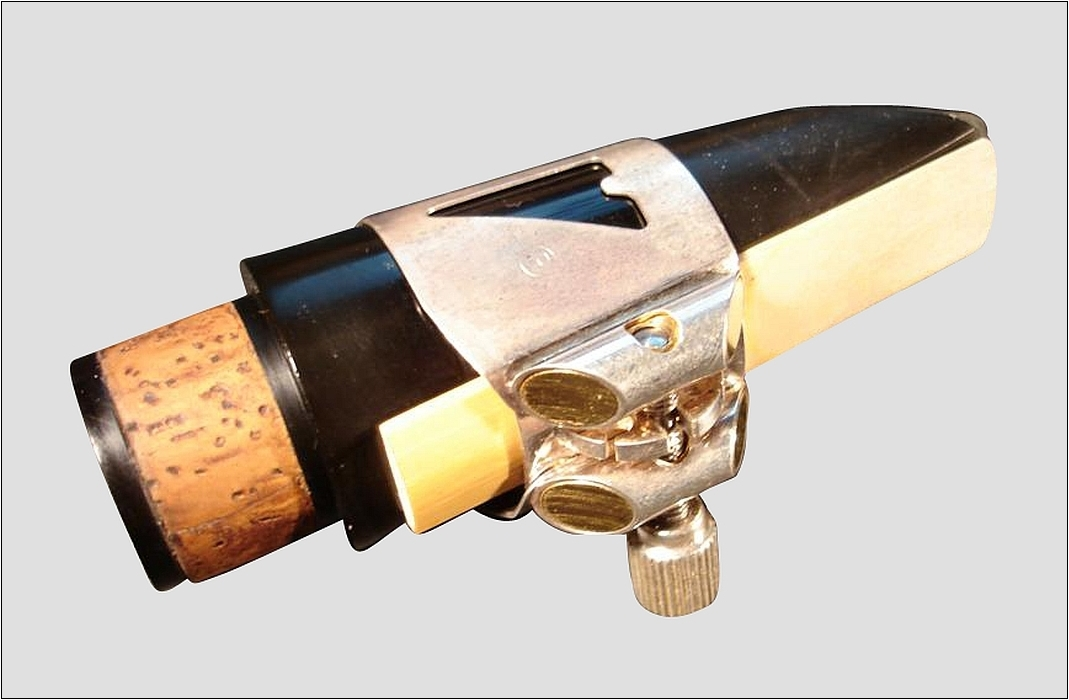
A clarinet mouthpiece set up to play with the reed held in place with the ligature

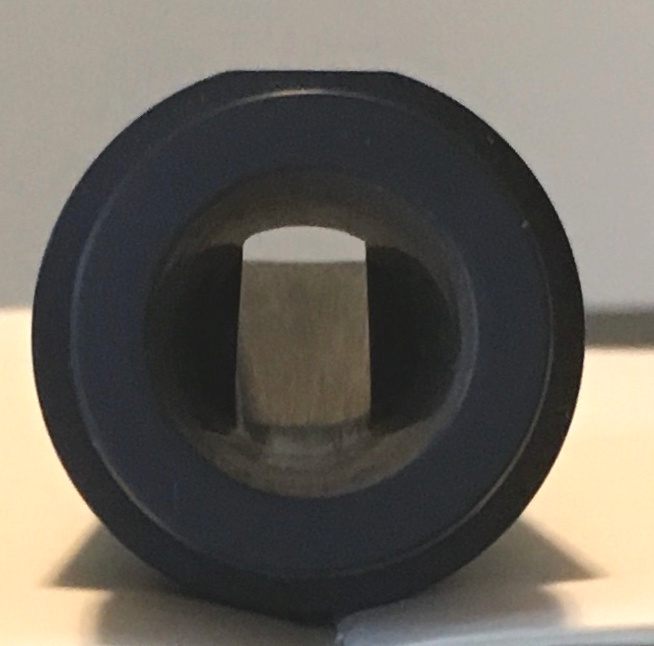
The interior chamber of a clarinet mouthpiece showing the straight side walls

The clarinet mouthpiece is narrow inside, typically with straight side walls. through the throat. The bottom of the mouthpiece is formed with a tenon that is ringed with cork.

Today, as with the saxophone mouthpiece, the reed is placed against the surface (the table) closest to the player's bottom lip. However, this was not always so: The earliest clarinetists would often place the reed on top of the mouthpiece.

Bernhard Crusell (1775–1838) was one of the first clarinettists of note to consistently place the reed against the bottom lip.

Of particular note is Reginald Kell who was known for using a "double embouchure", also known as "double lip". This is a technique popular in the UK up to the 1960s, whereby the reed is placed against the lower lip, which covers the lower teeth—as in the single embouchure—and additionally, the upper lip is tucked in between the top of the mouthpiece and the upper teeth.

Some clarinetists in Madagascar today still play with the reed on top as can be heard on the CD Bémiray: Polyphonies des Hauts-plateaux.

B♭ clarinet reed and mouthpiece

Clarinet mouthpieces are available in hundreds of styles from dozens of manufacturers around the world. Mouthpieces are often named after famous performers who contribute to their designs. Popular mouthpiece makers include Selmer, Vandoren, Yamaha, and Rico.

=== Saxophones ===
The saxophone mouthpiece is outwardly similar to that of the clarinet but has no tenon. Instead, the saxophone's neck has a ring of cork glued to it, and the mouthpiece fits firmly onto the neck cork.

Saxophone mouthpieces are available in hundreds of styles from dozens of manufacturers around the world. Mouthpieces are often named after famous performers who contribute to their designs.

When Adolphe Sax invented the saxophone, he specified the shape of the interior of the mouthpiece as being large and round. All saxophone mouthpieces were made in this style until the 1930s, when the advent of big-band jazz made saxophonists experiment with different shapes of mouthpieces to get a louder and edgier sound. A baffle, or section of the mouthpiece roof sloped close to the plane of the reed, became a design feature for enhancing volume and projection. Between 1940 and 1960, it became common for classical saxophonists to use narrow-chamber mouthpieces based on those designed for jazz use. These mouthpieces give the instrument a brighter and edgier sound (more high partials) than the traditional shape as designed by Sax. One saxophonist and teacher, Sigurd Raschèr, spoke out against this change in mouthpiece design. He believed that when used in classical music, the saxophone should sound as its inventor, Adolphe Sax, had intended, and that the gradual change to narrower and "brighter" sounding mouthpieces was a distortion of Sax's tonal concept. His students and other disciples felt that the desirable tone for a classical saxophone was a softer, rounder sound—a sound that can only be produced by a mouthpiece with a large, rounded interior (often referred to as an "excavated chamber"). By 1970, narrow-chambered mouthpieces had become nearly universally popular for playing in an environment with amplified instruments, and virtually all new designs featured a narrow chamber, high baffle, or both. Large-chambered and low-baffle pieces continue to be produced for those who seek the tonalities of classical music and "classic jazz."

In recent years, new design techniques have emerged such as 3D printing, which allows for the creation of custom saxophone mouthpieces. This innovation was the result of research carried out in IRCAM's scientific and acoustic research laboratory thanks to two acousticians, founders of Syos.

=== Materials ===
Clarinet and saxophone mouthpieces have been made out of hard (vulcanized) rubber, brass or other metal, crystal, glass, plastic, and wood. Today, the most common material for professional clarinet and (classical) saxophone mouthpieces is hard rubber. Jazz saxophone mouthpieces are made out of hard rubber, metal, or (rarely) wood. There is some debate over whether the material affects the tone, or whether tone is shaped only by the internal shape and dimensions of the mouthpiece. According to Larry Teal, the mouthpiece material has little, if any, effect on the sound, and the physical dimensions give a mouthpiece its tone colour. Some recent designs by Van Doren, Bari, and Saxgourmet reflect the theory that the mass of metal over the shank of the mouthpiece, which contacts the neck cork, stabilizes the connection and enhances the integrity of the harmonic series.

== Capped double-reed instruments ==
On a capped double-reed instrument the function of the mouthpiece is simply to provide a chamber within which the reed can vibrate, with a hole through which air can be blown.

== Fipple flutes ==
On a fipple flute the mouthpiece, or fipple, provides a shaped passageway for air to be blown against an edge, producing turbulent flow which excites the resonant vibrational modes of the air column.

== Pirouettes ==
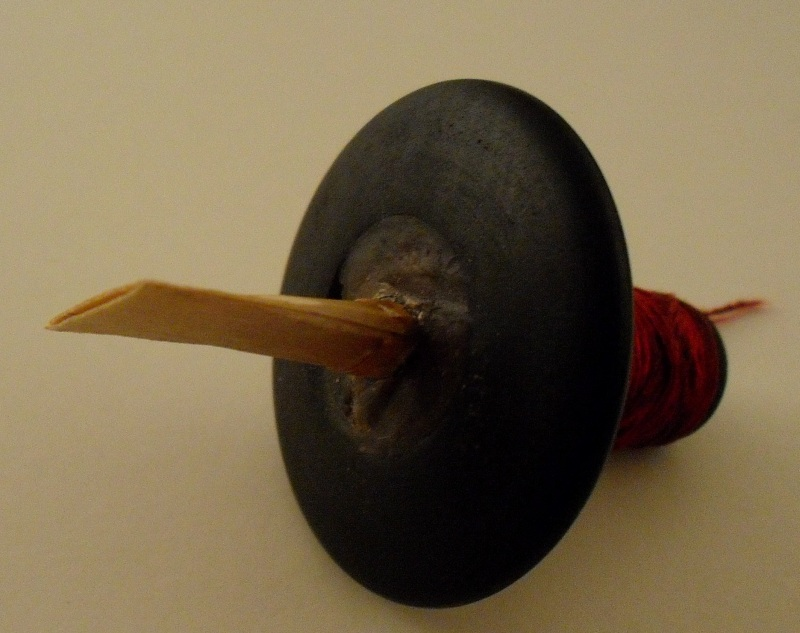
Pirouette from a ciaramella

A pirouette is a wooden mouthpiece assembly or lip rest used in some European double-reed instruments, including the piffero, shawm and rackett. In band shawms, it is carried on the staple on which the reed is mounted On the European shawm, the pirouette replaces the loose disc of the oriental surna, presumably to secure lip-control over the cane reed. The player presses their lips against the pirouette while holding the reed in their mouth. This permits control of the reed by the lips without appreciably affecting the amplitude of its vibration.
