= Hirtenschalmei =

Double reeded woodwind instrument

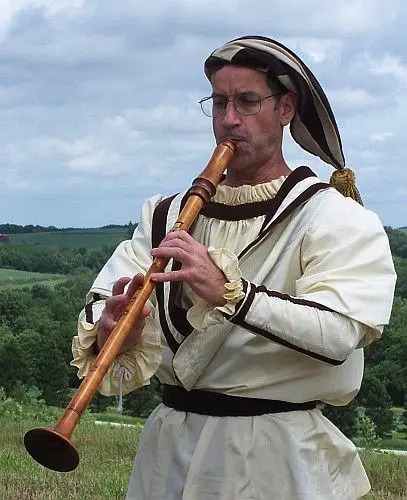
- A Hirtenschalmei being played.

Woodwind instrument
- Classification: Aerophone
- Hornbostel–Sachs classification: 422.111

Related instruments
- Rauschpfeife, Shawm

The Hirtenschalmei (or shepherd's shawm) is a double reeded woodwind instrument, with a cylindrical bore and a flared bell, reconstructed based on iconographic sources in the late 20th century. The instrument is described as producing a "buzzy" sound. The Hirtenschalmei tends to be quieter than a shawm. The double reed in the instrument is capped. The instrument is often mentioned in medieval French literature and art, depicted as being played by rustic figures.

All instances of the instruments today are reconstructed based on an instrument found on the wreck of the Mary Rose, during salvage operations in the 1980s. However, this instrument could also have been dulzaina. Today, reconstructions are made in soprano, tenor and alto sizes.
