= Octavin =

Woodwind instrument

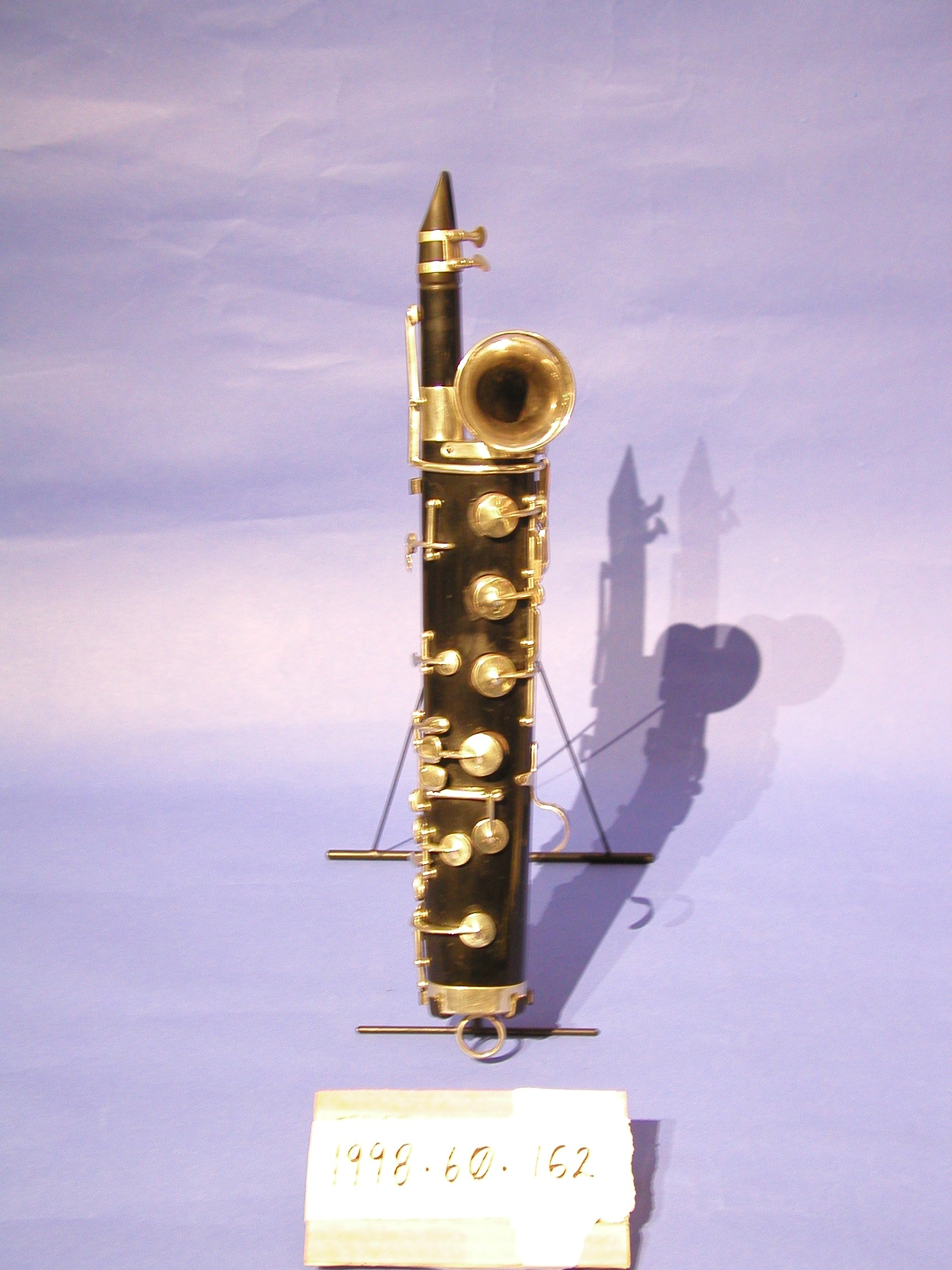

Woodwind instrument
- Classification: Aerophone
- Hornbostel–Sachs classification: 422.212 (Single reed instrument with irregular bore)
- Inventor(s): Julius Jehring
- Developed: 19th century

The octavin (also spelled oktavin) is a 19th century woodwind instrument with a conical bore and a single reed.

== Design ==
The octavin resembles a saxophone: its range is similar to that of a soprano saxophone. However, the octavin differs in three respects: first, its conical bore has a smaller taper than that of a saxophone; second, its body is made of wood, rather than metal; third, its usual shape is more similar to that of a bassoon, having two parallel straight sections joined at the bottom, with the mouthpiece attached to the top of one section and a metal bell to the top of the other. A few straight octavins exist, having a wooden bell; in this configuration it resembles a tarogato but has a smaller taper. The instrument was produced in B♭, C and F. One writer (Altenberg) mentions a bass octavin but no such instrument is known to have been produced. The (written) range of the octavin is from G♯_{3} to G_{6}.

== Production ==
The octavin was invented in 1881 by Julius Jehring, a bassoon maker. It was later patented in 1893 by Oskar Adler and Hermann Jordan of Markneukirchen, Germany.

== Legacy ==
The octavin was a commercial failure and is now extremely rare, being considered a curiosity by collectors. However, the octavin is memorialized by the organ stop bearing its name. Repertoire for the instrument is scarce: one of the only pieces for the octavin is a sonatina composed by Jeff Britting (b. 1957).
