= Pierre-Auguste Sarrus =

- Born: March 14 or 15, 1813; Saint-Affrique, France
- Died: May 3, 1876; Paris, France
- Occupations: Musician, Inventor
- Spouse: Mélanie Bellemère

Pierre-Auguste Sarrus (March 14 or 15, 1813 – May 3, 1876) was a French musician and inventor.

== History ==
- He joined the army at the age of 23.
- November 27, 1843: Sarrus is affected to the 74th Régiment d'Infanterie as corporal-chief of the music, it is the start of his military musician career.
- August 18, 1846: wedding with Mélanie Bellemère.
- 1852: Sarrus receives the Médaille militaire.
- 1854: Member of the Expédition d'Orient (Crimean War), he receives the Médaille de Crimée.
- April 2, 1855: he is affected to the 13th Régiment d'Infanterie.
- July 10, 1855: he is promoted officer.
- 1860-61: member of the Campaign of Syria.
- 1863: he receives the 5th class Turkish Médjidié's order and the Victoria Cross.
- December 26, 1864: he is made knight of the Légion d'honneur.
- July 10, 1867: Sarrus gets retired, he was then chief of music (ranking as a lieutenant) of the 13th Régiment d'Infanterie de Ligne.

Nevertheless, Pierre-Auguste Sarrus is not famous for his military career, but for having invented a music instrument to replace the oboe and bassoon in military music in 1856. Pierre-Louis Gautrot built this instrument and patented it under the name sarrusophone.
