= Pierre-Louis Gautrot =

French musical instrument maker and inventor (1812–1882)

- Born: 1 March 1812; Auteuil, Paris
- Died: 18 November 1882 (aged 70); Paris
- Occupations: Inventor, musical instrument maker
- Known for: Instrument maker and inventor of the sarrusophone

Pierre-Louis Gautrot (French: [pjɛʁ lwi ɡotʁo]; 1 March 1812, Auteuil, Paris – 18 November 1882, Paris) was a French inventor and manufacturer of brass and woodwind instruments.

== Biography ==
Pierre-Louis Gautrot was born on 1 March 1812 in Auteuil, Paris and began making musical instruments at a young age, in his home in 1827. In the same year, his future brother-in-law Jean Auguste Guichard (1804–1884) began producing musical instruments with industrial production line processes and 210 workers. Gautrot started working with Guichard, developing the company's international business activities. Guichard's company won a gold medal at the French Industrial Exposition of 1844 for their hand horn and cornet.

Guichard retired from the company in 1845 and sold it to Gautrot. It produced more than 200 models in 1850, and had branches in London, Madrid, Naples and New York.

He started selling cheaper instruments to increase his market. In 1845, a long legal battle began with instrument maker Adolphe Sax, who sued Gautrot for copying his patented instrument designs. The case ended in 1867 with Gautrot's conviction to pay 500,000 francs of damages to Sax.

In 1851, his musical instrument factory was established at 60 rue Saint-Louis in Paris. In 1855, to expand, he bought land and a factory at Château-Thierry, where most of his musical instruments were to be manufactured. In 1857, he bought the flute manufacturer Jean-Louis Tulou, and built a second instrument factory in Château-Thierry. He modernised the company's use of steam-powered machinery.

Instruments by Gautrot aîné & Cie
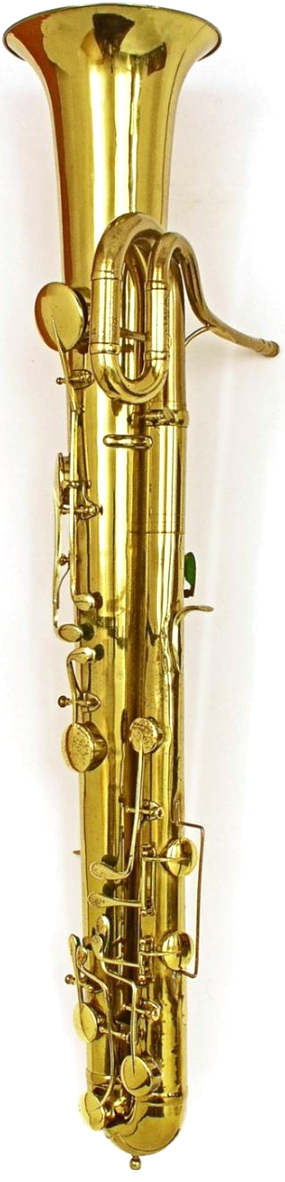
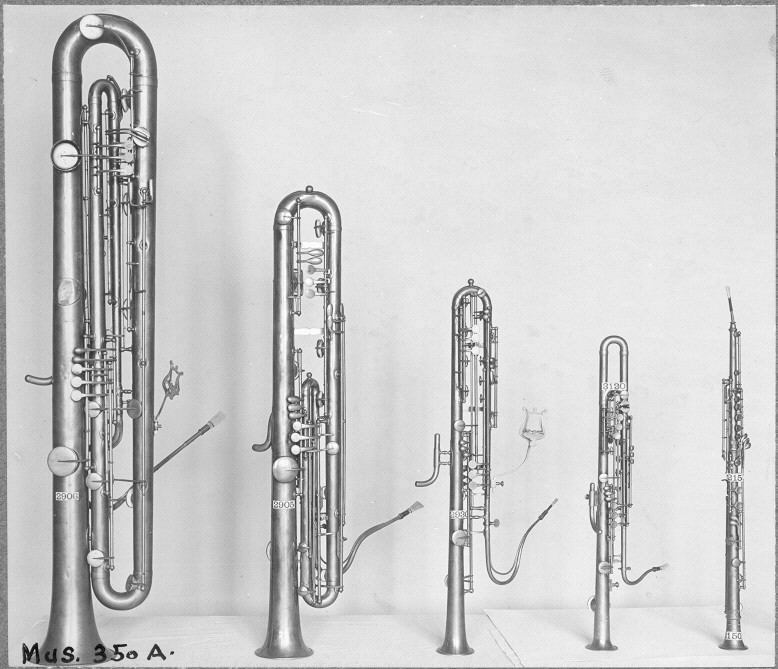
Ophicleide, mid-19th century (Musical Instrument Museum, University of Edinburgh). Sarrusophones, left to right: bass, baritone, tenor, alto and soprano (Metropolitan Museum of Art, New York)

Gautrot filed about 40 patents during his career, including inventing the sarussophone in 1856. He won many prizes at exhibitions, including silver and gold medals at the Paris expositions universelles.

In 1865, Jean-Baptiste Couesnon came to work for Gautrot. His brother, Félix Couesnon, a banker, got to take care of the company's interests.

The company took the name of "Gautrot aîné & Cie" in 1869. He filed two trademarks in 1875 for brass instruments: "Gautrot-Marquet" for his premium line, and "Gautrot Breveté / à Paris" for the cheaper second choice instruments. Trademarks were also filed for woodwind instruments and cymbals. In 1877, he added his son-in-law Léon Durand's name to the company, becoming "Gautrot aîné-Durand".

In 1881, Gautrot moved the company's head office and a major factory at 90 rue d'Angoulême (present-day rue Jean-Pierre Timbaud), and bought the bankrupt Triébert oboe and bassoon factory.

== Legacy ==
In 1835 he married Charlotte Fischer and had a daughter, Aimée Geneviève Gautrot. When Charlotte died in 1851, he married Augustine Désirée Marquet (1826–1882) on 22 August 1851, with whom he had two daughters, Cécile (1852–1918) and Mathilde (1855–?). Cécile married Léon Durand (1844-1912), and Mathilde married Amédée Couesnon (1850-1931), son of Félix Couesnon, in Paris on 20 February 1874.

After Gautrot's death, management of the company returned in 1882 to his son-in-law Amédée Couesnon, who renamed it "Couesnon, Gautrot et Cie", then "Couesnon & Cie" in 1888. In 1999, it was purchased by PGM to form PGM Couesnon.
