= Buffet Crampon =

French wind musical instrument manufacturer

Buffet Crampon SAS
- Industry: manufacture of musical instruments
- Genre: Wind instrument manufacturers
- Founded: 1825
- Headquarters: Mantes-la-Ville, France
- Key people: Jerôme Perrod, Jean-Baptiste Bouvier
- Number of employees: 1000
- Website: buffet-crampon.com

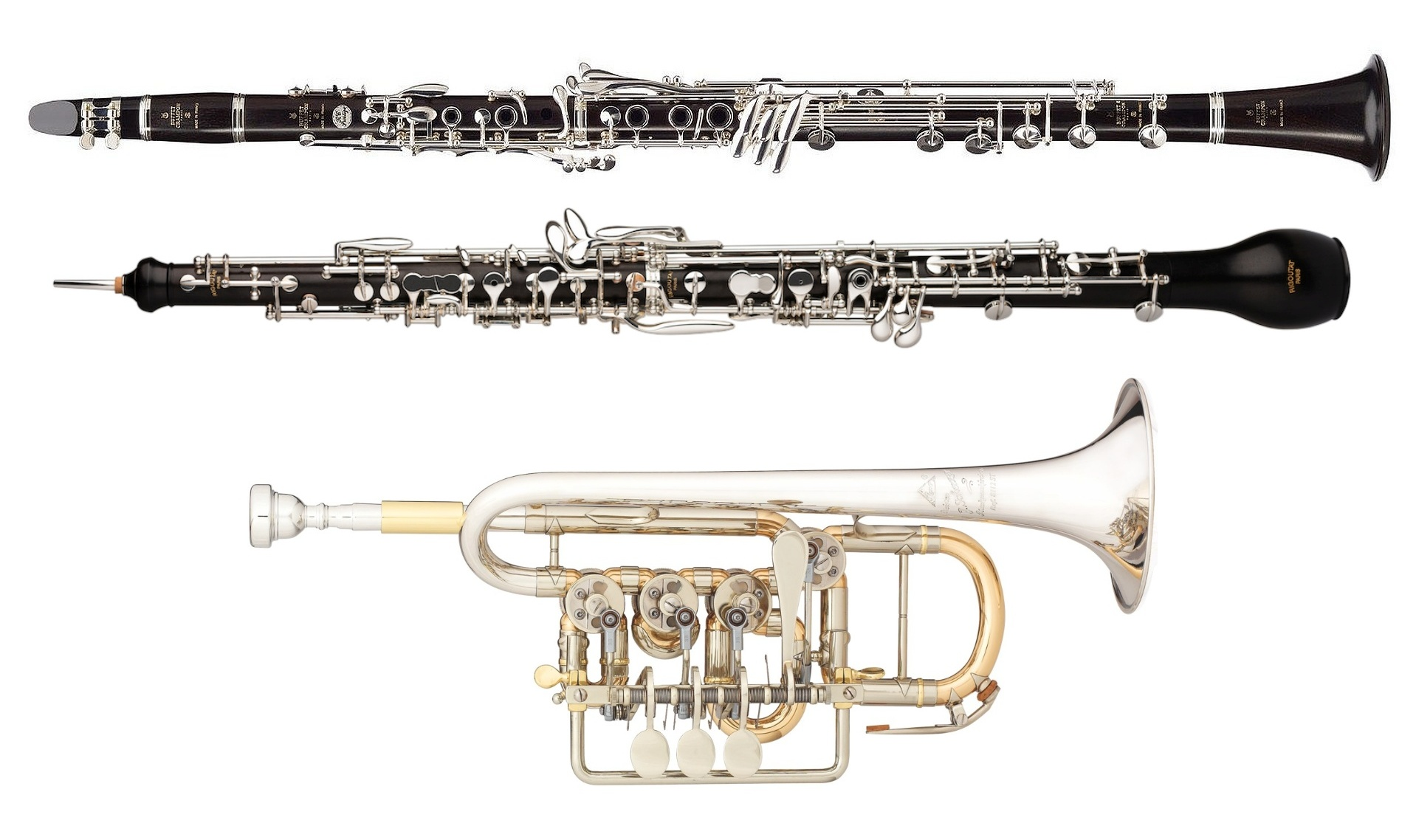
Basset clarinet, oboe d'amore, piccolo trumpet

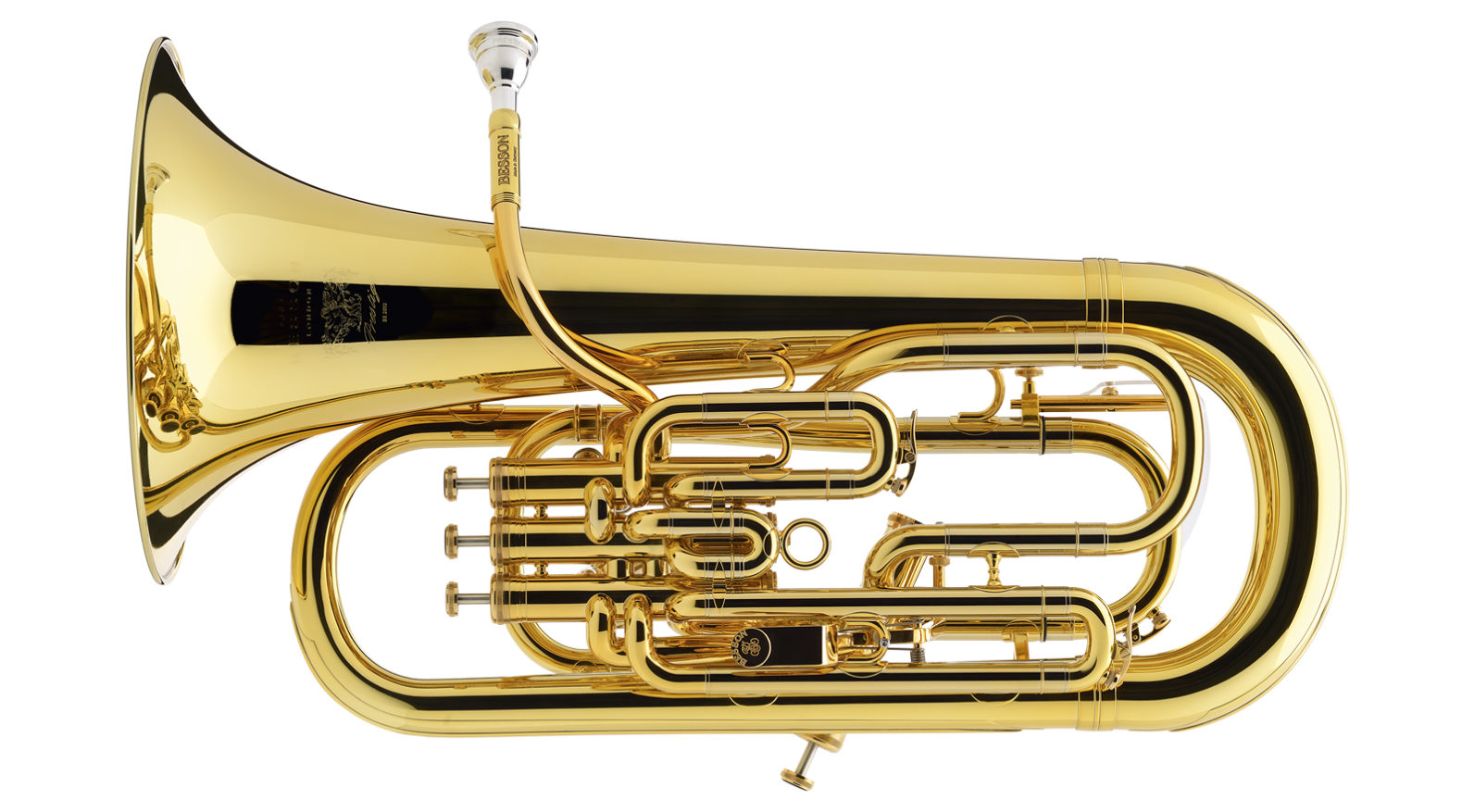
Euphonium

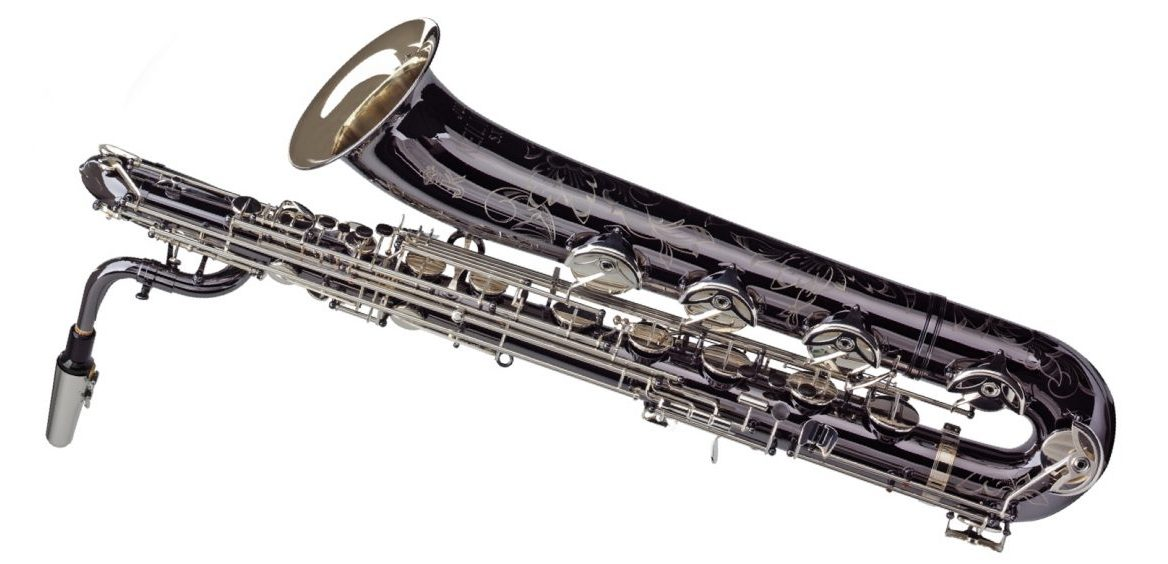
Baritone saxophone

Buffet Crampon SAS is a French manufacturer of wind instruments based in Mantes-la-Ville, in the Yvelines department. The company is the world market leader in the production of Boehm system clarinets. Its subsidiary, Buffet Crampon Deutschland GmbH, founded in 2010 and based in Markneukirchen, Vogtland, Sachsen, is the world market leader in the manufacture of brass instruments. To manufacture and sell its products, the BC Group employed approximately 1,000 people worldwide at the beginning of 2021, 470 of whom were employed by BC Germany alone. The management of the group has been led by Jérôme Perrod since 2014.

== Products and brands ==
The following brands / labels, with the exception of the Buffet Crampon brand, were formerly independent companies whose essential assets, including the name and trademark rights, are owned by other companies and ultimately were acquired partly by Buffet Crampon SAS partly by BC Deutschland GmbH, and which were then dissolved as companies.

The Buffet Crampon SAS has six brands under which it manufactures the following instruments.

- Buffet Crampon: Clarinets with a French fingering system (Boehm), including nearly the entire clarinet family in tunings from high E♭ to contralto, also oboes, English horns, bassoons (with French fingering and drilling) and saxophones
- Rigoutat: Oboes, English horns, oboes d'amore and baritone oboes
- Parmenon: transverse flutes
- Verne Q. Powell: Flutes and piccolos
- Antoine Courtois: trombones, flugelhorns and saxhorns
- Besson: trumpets, trombones, cornets, alto horns, tenor horns, baritone horns, euphoniums and tubas in E♭ and B♭

BC Deutschland also manufactures instruments under the following six brands:

- B&S: Trumpets, trombones, cornets, flugelhorns, tenor horns, baritone horns and tubas
- Hans Hoyer: Simple horns, double horns, triple horns, descant horns and Wagner tubas
- Melton Meinl Weston: flugelhorns, baritone and tenor horns, bass trumpets, tubas and cimbassos
- J.Scherzer: B♭ and C trumpets and high trumpets
- W. Schreiber: Clarinets in B♭ and C (one model) with German fingering (Oehler), bassoons and contrabassoons
- Julius Keilwerth: Saxophones (soprano, alto, tenor, baritone and bass)

== Production and sales ==
The BC group of companies has six production sites in which they manufacture the following instruments.

- in Mantes-la-Ville: professional clarinets, oboes, French bassoons
- in Markneukirchen: all brass instruments of the Buffet Crampon Group are manufactured, except Besson student instruments and the high-end Melton Meinl Weston models. Student clarinets under the Buffet Crampon brand and all instruments of the W. Schreiber and J. Keilwerth brands are also made here
- in Geretsried: near Munich: the instruments of the brand Melton Meinl Weston, (R&D center for all brass instruments of the group)
- in Beijing: brass instruments for beginners
- in Shanghai: woodwind instruments for beginners
- in Maynard: Massachusetts: VQPowell flutes

BC has sales companies in the United States, Canada, Japan and the Netherlands. It also has six showrooms: in Paris, Geretsried near Munich, Amsterdam, Jacksonville, Tokyo and Beijing.

== History ==
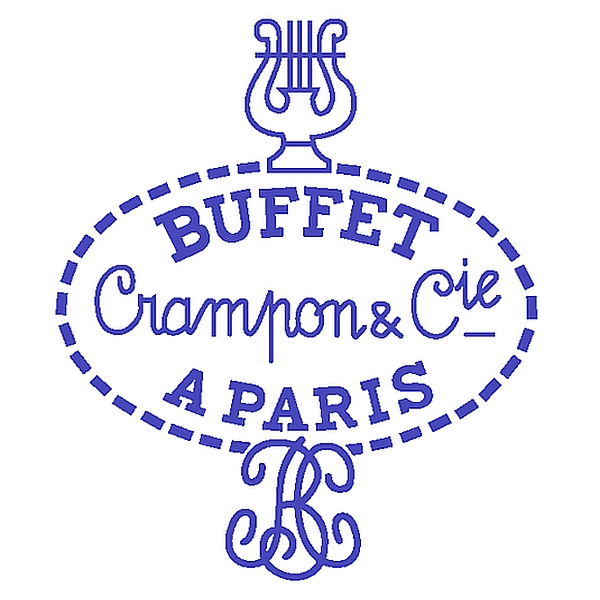
Logo from 1844

Denis Buffet-Auger, of the Buffet family of French musical instrument makers, began making quality clarinets in Paris, France in 1825. The company expanded under Jean-Louis Buffet and his wife Zoé Crampon and became known as BUFFET Crampon & Cie à Paris (BC). (Another family member, Auguste Buffet jeune, who worked with famous clarinetist Hyacinthe Klosé to develop the Boehm system for clarinet, had his own business separate from BC.)

In 1850, BC established its headquarters at Mantes-la-Ville. The company continued to expand its range and quality in instrument production, beginning saxophone production in 1866, and winning numerous awards.

In 1877 BC acquired the Evette & Schaeffer Company and began to use that name as their instrument brand. In 1887 BC obtained a patent for a mechanism to control an extra key on an extended saxophone bell, extending the lower range from B to B♭. In 1908 BC began exporting instruments to the US. In 1910 BC introduced the Apogee, a premium model saxophone, which had innovative keywork features that were later adapted by other manufacturers. In 1918 BC began marketing their premium line instruments under their own name, while marketing lower grade instruments variously under the Evette & Schaeffer and Evette brands. During the 1930s BC began outsourcing Evette & Schaeffer instruments to other manufacturers.

2005: Logo of the new company Buffet Group Wind Instruments S.A.S.

In 1950, BC developed its famous R13 clarinet, an extremely popular professional-level clarinet. The company also began production of the Dynaction model saxophones that year. These evolved into the Super Dynaction (1957) and the highly regarded S series (1973) models. Buffet also became the leading distributor of student-grade instruments in Europe, marketing French and Italian made saxophones under their Evette & Schaeffer brand. During the late 1970s and 1980s, the company's position in the student saxophone market collapsed in the face of competition from Yamaha, who offered higher quality and more up-to-date instruments, and lower cost East German, Czech, and Asian manufacturers. Their collapse in the student market accompanied a deteriorating position in the market for professional saxophones. Buffet left the saxophone market in the mid-1980s. In 2006 Buffet re-entered the saxophone market with their 400 model, sourced from China.(source?)

In 1981, BC joined Boosey & Hawkes, which sold the French company to The Music Group in 2003. Two years later BC was bought by a French group and was given the company name BUFFET Group Wind Instruments SAS, but continues to sell its products under the Buffet Crampon brand.

In 2006 Buffet Group acquired two brass instrument manufacturers, Antoine Courtois Paris and Besson. In 2008 Buffet Group acquired the Leblanc clarinet factory in La Couture-Boussey, Département of Eure, Haute-Normandie in France.

=== Evette and Evette & Schaeffer clarinets ===
Until the 1980s, only professional level clarinets carried the BC name. Lower priced clarinets for the beginner and intermediate market were branded "Evette" and "Evette & Schaeffer", respectively. For a time, the Evette clarinets actually were built by other manufacturers under BC's sponsorship, and these instruments are marked "Evette sponsored by Buffet". By the early 1970s, Buffet was making the Evettes in their own factory in Paris, and around 1979, manufacture was moved to a Buffet-owned factory in Germany. Evette & Schaeffer clarinets were made in Paris. Use of the Evette and Evette & Schaeffer brands ended around 1985, when the company began using the Buffet name on all its clarinets.

=== 2010 to the beginning of 2021 ===
In 2010, the newly founded Buffet Crampon Deutschland GmbH, based in Markneukirchen, acquired the production facility there, along with the W. Schreiber and Julius Keilwerth brands, from the insolvent company Schreiber & Keilwerth GmbH. Prior to the acquisition, the insolvency administrator had reduced the workforce in Markneukirchen from 252 to 134 employees over the preceding months. The company manufactured clarinets of German systems and bassoons under the brand name W. Schreiber and saxophones under the brand name J. Keilwerth. In 2012, BC Germany also takes over B&S GmbH, which also produces in Markneukirchen, the leading European manufacturer of brass instruments with 250 employees and the brands B&S, Hans Hoyer, Melton, Meinl, Weston and J. Scherzer and integrates them into the company, whose workforce will grow to more than 400 employees (470 at the beginning of 2021). With these two most important acquisitions in the company's history, the Buffet Group can almost double its sales and has since taken a leading position not only in the field of woodwind instruments, but also brass instruments.

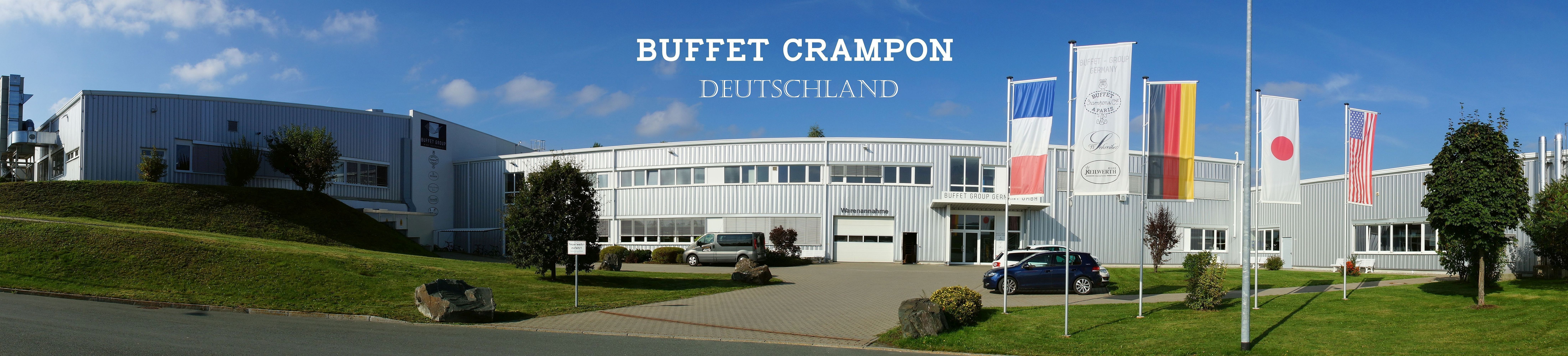
Panorama of the Markneukirchen woodwind instrument factory (formerly Schreiber & Keilwerth)

In 2012, Fondations Capital France SAS becomes shareholder in Buffet Group SAS. Fondations Capital is a subsidiary of Trail, a European private-equity company with registered office in Paris.

In 2014, Jérôme Perrod was appointed as the new CEO of the Buffet Group.

2016: Logo of the renamed company Buffet Crampon S.A.S.

2015 Buffet Group founds a subsidiary in China, the Buffet Crampon Manufacturing Musical Instruments Co. LTD, which is building a production facility for 160 employees in Beijing, where 4,000 brass instruments for students have been manufactured annually from 2016 onwards.

With the beginning of 2016 the Buffet Group Wind Instruments SAS was renamed Buffet Crampon SAS (BC).

In January 2019, BC acquired the French oboe manufacturer Rigoutat, Paris.

After the takeover of Powell Flutes in 2016, Parmenon was acquired in June 2019, whose know-how and reputation strengthen the group's competence in the flute market.

2020 BC opens a showroom in Beijing and builds a new factory (BCMMI) for 130 employees near Shanghai, with an annual capacity of 50,000 instruments.

BC is a partner of Woodstock's brass band.

== Clarinet models ==
The company is most famous for their clarinets, as Buffet is the brand of choice for many professionals.

Buffet Crampon has released several clarinet models from the mid-20th century onwards, with models ranging from student to professional in marketing. The development of new models has sometimes led to the discontinuation of older models. The student models tend to be made from ABS resin, whereas intermediate and professional models are usually made from grenadilla wood. The professional models are usually made from more select grenadilla wood, and are usually unstained. Various options have been made available for select professional models, including the Greenline option, additional keywork, and gold-plated keys.

BC makes more than 400 models of its instruments. Because of the special importance as a manufacturer of clarinets with French system, the current models are listed below.

The following models are currently available (as of the end of 2021)

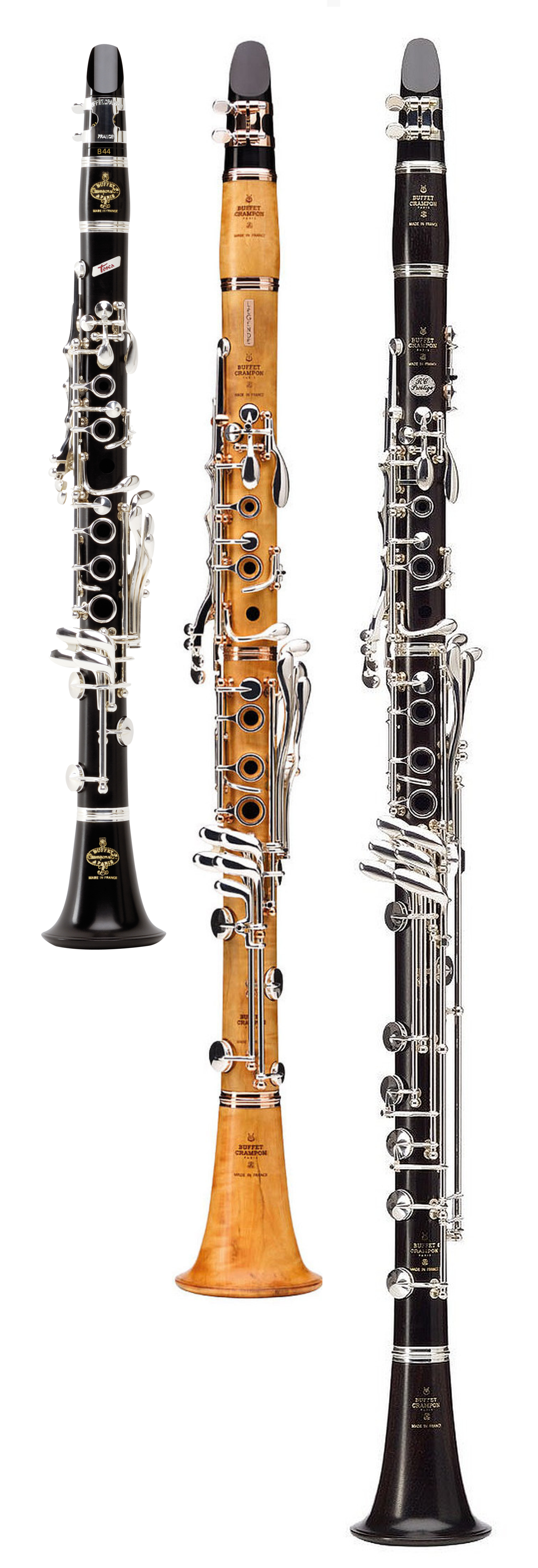
3 clarinets in the high to the beginning of the middle register: E♭ clarinet, B♭ clarinet and basset clarinet

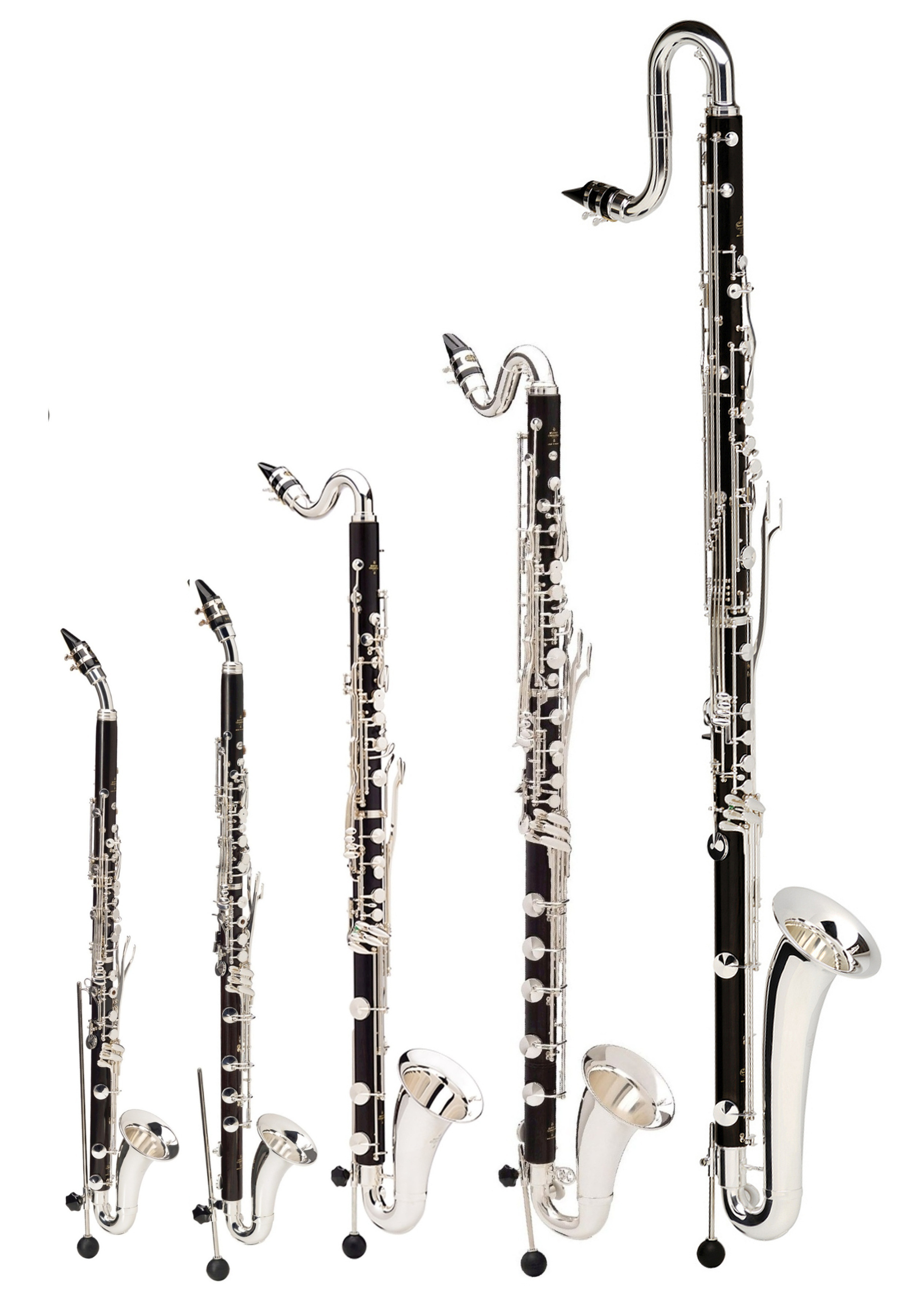
5 clarinets in the middle and low registers: alto clarinet, basset horn, short and long bass clarinet, contralto clarinet

No matching standards in the two pictures (The basset clarinet is slightly smaller than the alto clarinet.)

Model	high A♭/G/E♭	C / D	B♭	A	G	Basset clar. in A/B♭/G	Basset horn in F	Alto in E♭	Bass to deep E♭ / D in B♭	Bass to deep C in B♭	Contra alto in E♭ double bass in B♭
E 12F			x								
Conservatoire			x								
Prodige			x								
E 13			x								
Legende			x	x							
Legende from boxwood			x	x							
Gala			x	x							
Tradition			x	x							
Divine			x	x							
Festival			x	x							
Vintage			x	x							
R13 Prestige			x	x							
RC	E♭		x	x							
R 13	E♭		x	x							
E 11	E♭	C	x	x							
BCXXI			x	x							
Tosca	E♭		x	x					Mod.1185 (prof.); 1180 (student)	Mod.1195 (prof.)	
RC Prestige	E♭	C+D	x	x		A	x	x		Mod. 1193 (prof.)	Contra alto

Remarks

=== Student Models ===
Model	Body	Notes
Premium	ABS resin	Succeeded by previous B10 model
Prodige	ABS resin	Succeeded by previous B12 model
1180	Grenadilla	Student model bass cl.

=== Intermediate ===
Model	Notes
E11	Made in China / Germany; more commonly sold in the United States
E12F	Made in France / Germany; introduced September 2012
E13	Made in France

=== Professional ===
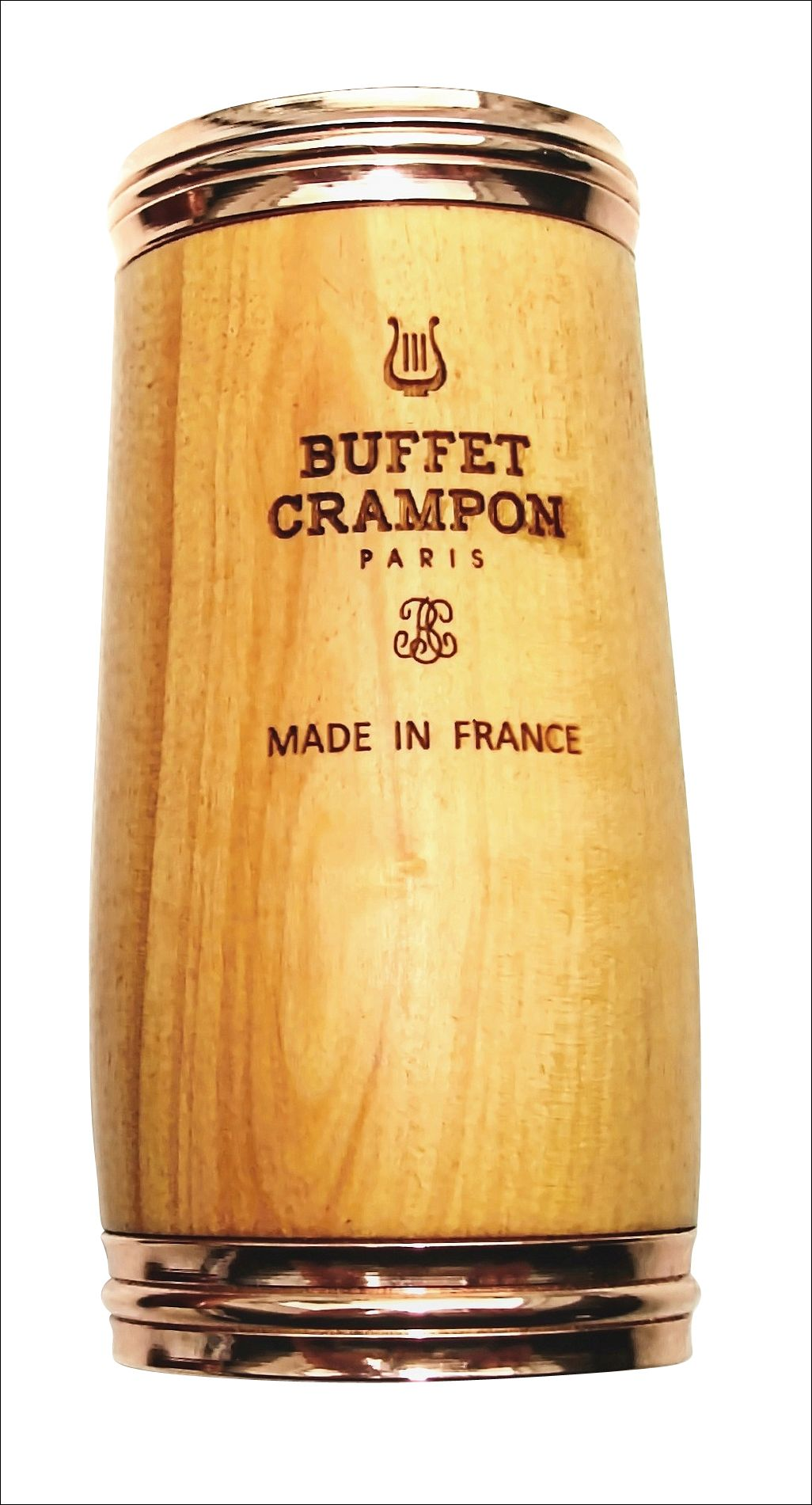
Barrel in boxwood

Model	Greenline option?	Notes
Conservatoire	No	Semi-professional model, also known as the C12 model
R13	Yes	Most popular professional model, named after its designer, Robert Carrée
RC	Yes	Evolved from the R13 model with distinctive barrel and bell shape; developed in 1974 with the assistance of the luthier Robert Carrée, for whom the model is named
Vintage	No	Replaced the S1; closer to the original 1950s R13 bore design
Festival	Yes	Has R13 bore with denser wood; register key is 1 mm higher than on a standard R13; has additional alternate left-hand E♭/A♭ lever
R13 Prestige	No	Made from highest quality unstained grenadilla wood; has additional alternate left-hand E♭/A♭ lever
RC Prestige	Yes	Smaller bore than R13 model; more popular in Europe; has additional alternate left-hand E♭/A♭ lever
Tosca	Yes	Introduced in 2003; has unique bore design and reshaped keywork; has auxiliary E♭ key and low F correction key
Divine	No	Introduced in March 2012 as Buffet's top-of-the-line model
Legende	No	Introduced in July 2017 as Buffet's top-of-the-line model
Tradition	No	New cylindrical bore design, which goes back to the earlier BC20 model. New design and improved equipment from April 2019
Gala	No	Introduced 2020, cylindrical bore design as the Tradition
BCXXI	No	Introduced in late 2021, cylindrical bore, range extended to low E♭

French	Buffet Crampon	Rigutat	Parmenon	Verne Q. Powell	Courtois	Label Besson
German	B&S	Hans Hoyer	J. Scherzer	Melton Meinl Weston	W. Schreiber	Julius Keilwerth
