= Range (music) =

Pitch range of musical instruments

Written range of a saxophone.

In music, the range, or chromatic range, of a musical instrument is the distance from the lowest to the highest pitch it can play. For a singing voice, the equivalent is vocal range. The range of a musical part is the distance between its lowest and highest note.

== Compass ==
Among British English speakers, and perhaps others, compass means the same thing as chromatic range—the interval between the lowest and highest note attainable by a voice or musical instrument.

== Other ranges ==
The terms sounding range, written range, designated range, duration range and dynamic range have specific meanings.

The sounding range refers to the pitches produced by an instrument, while the written range refers to the compass (span) of notes written in the sheet music, where the part is sometimes transposed for convenience. A piccolo, for example, typically has a sounding range one octave higher than its written range. The designated range is the set of notes the player should or can achieve while playing. All instruments have a designated range, and all pitched instruments have a playing range. Timbre, dynamics, and duration ranges are interrelated and one may achieve registral range at the expense of timbre. The designated range is thus the range in which a player is expected to have comfortable control of all aspects.

The duration range is the difference between the shortest and longest rhythm used. Dynamic range is the difference between the quietest and loudest volume of an instrument, part or piece of music.

== Range limits ==
Although woodwind instruments and string instruments have no theoretical upper limit to their range (subject to practical limits), they generally cannot go below their designated range. Brass instruments, on the other hand, can play beyond their designated ranges. Notes lower than the brass instrument's designated range are called pedal tones. The playing range of a brass instrument depends on both the technical limitations of the instrument and the skill of the player.

Classical arrangements rarely make woodwind or brass instruments play beyond their designed range. String musicians play the bottom of their ranges very frequently, but the top of a string instrument's range is rather fuzzy, and it is unusual for a string player to exceed the designated range. It is quite rare for wind musicians to play the extremes of their instruments. The most common exception is that in many 20th century works, pedal tones are called for in bass trombones.

This chart uses standard numberings for octaves where middle C corresponds to C_{4}. In the MIDI language, middle C is referred to as MIDI note number 60.

The lowest note that a pipe organ can sound (with a true pipe) is C_{−1} (or CCCC), which is 8 Hz, below the range of human hearing and not visible on this chart. However, if acoustic combination (a note and its fifth) counts, the lowest note is C_{−2} (or CCCCC), which is 4 Hz.

In terms of recording and reproduction, many speakers have a low limit of around 40–60 Hz.

== Typical ranges ==
*This chart only displays down to C_{0}, though some pipe organs, such as the Boardwalk Hall Auditorium Organ, extend down to C_{−1} (one octave below C_{0}). Also, the fundamental frequency of the subcontrabass tuba is B♭_{−1}.

== See also ==
- Tessitura
- Extension (music)
- Sub-bass
- Hearing range
