= Orsi Instrument Company =

Italian manufacturer of wind and brass musical instruments

Romeo Orsi
- Romeo Orsi logo
- Native name: Prof. Romeo Orsi S.r.l.
- Company type: Private
- Founded: 1836
- Founder: Romeo Orsi
- Headquarters: Tradate, Italy
- Area served: Worldwide
- Website: orsi-wind-instruments.it

Orsi Instrument Company, sometimes called Romeo Orsi or commonly just Orsi, is an Italian manufacturer of musical instruments, especially brass and woodwind instruments. They are notable for being one of the few manufacturers in the world to have made the now rare sarrusophones, the contrabass saxophone, and the piccolo A♭ clarinet.

== History ==
Professor Romeo Orsi joined Paolo Maino's factory and founded the Maino & Orsi company. They have been producing musical instruments since 1836. The factory is currently based in Tradate, Italy.

== See also ==
- List of Italian companies
