= Mezzo-soprano saxophone =

Musical instrument in the saxophone family

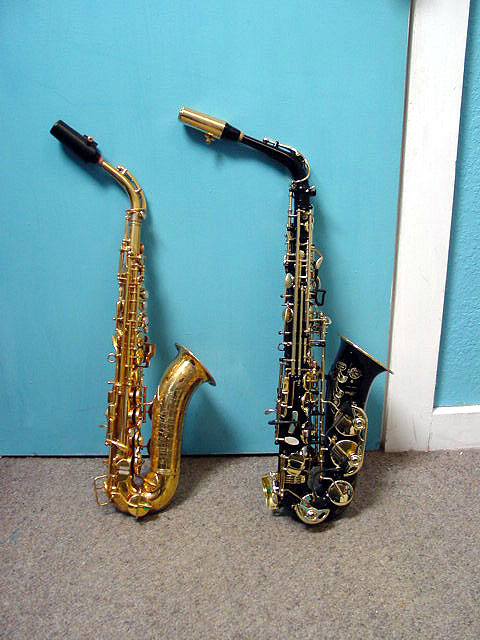
- Mezzo-soprano (left) and alto (right) saxophones

Woodwind instrument
- Classification: Single-reed
- Hornbostel–Sachs classification: 422.212-71 (Single-reed aerophone with keys)
- Inventor: Adolphe Sax
- Developed: 1840s

Playing range
- The mezzo-soprano saxophone in F sounds a perfect fifth lower than written. Most can reach high F♯ or higher using altissimo fingerings.

Related instruments
- Sizes: Soprillo; sopranino; soprano; alto; tenor; baritone; bass; contrabass; subcontrabass; Orchestral saxophones: C soprano; mezzo-soprano; C melody; Specialty saxophones: Aulochrome; tubax

Musicians
- See list of saxophonists

The mezzo-soprano saxophone, sometimes called the F alto saxophone, is an instrument in the saxophone family. It is in the key of F, pitched one whole tone above the alto saxophone in E♭. Its size and timbre are similar to the E♭ alto, although the upper register sounds closer to a B♭ soprano. Very few mezzo-sopranos exist – they were only produced in 1928 and 1929 by C. G. Conn. They were not popular and did not sell widely, as their production coincided with the Wall Street crash of 1929 and the following Great Depression. Harsh economic conditions forced Conn to reduce the range of saxophones it produced to only the most popular models.

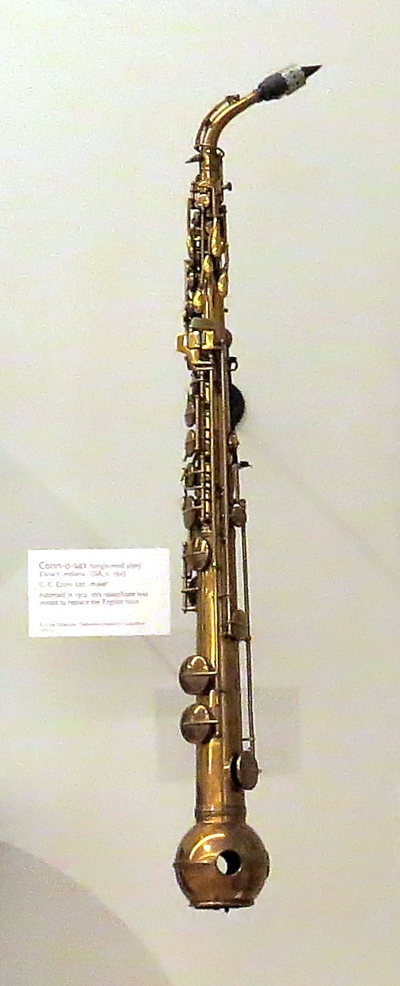
Conn-O-Sax, c. 1930, by C. G. Conn

Conn used the surplus stock of mezzo-sopranos to teach instrument repair in Conn's Elkhart workshops. Typically, a Conn instructor would deliberately damage the mezzo-sopranos (e.g., dropping them onto a concrete floor) and the students would then be tasked with repairing them. The repeated wear and tear of these actions eventually destroyed the saxophones.

Around the same time, Conn also developed the Conn-O-Sax in F; however, this instrument was built straight, with a slightly-curved neck, a spherical, liebesfuss-style bell, and extra keys for low A and up to high G, intended to imitate the form, range, and timbre of the cor anglais. It was produced only in small numbers in 1929–1930 and is highly sought after by collectors.

The mezzo-soprano is the only saxophone pitched in F that has ever been built, apart from prototypes of an F baritone. Although Maurice Ravel's 1928 orchestral work Boléro calls for a sopranino saxophone in F, it is unlikely the instrument ever existed; the part is usually performed on an E♭ sopranino or B♭ soprano.

Notable players of the mezzo-soprano saxophone include Anthony Braxton, James Carter, Blaise Garza, Vinny Golia, Jon Irabagon, and Colin Stetson.

More recently, a mezzo-soprano in the key of G has been produced by the Danish woodwind technician Peter Jessen, most notably played by Benjamin Koppel and Joe Lovano. Their collaboration can be heard on The Mezzo Sax Encounter (LP/CD, 2016), where Koppel and Lovano are accompanied by pianist Kenny Werner, bassist Scott Colley, and drummer Johnathan Blake. This instrument has a timbral quality similar to the B♭ soprano saxophone.

== In classical music ==
It was called for by Richard Strauss in his Symphonia domestica, written in 1903–1904, which includes parts for four saxophones including an alto saxophone in F.

== In other music ==
The 1968 song "Transcendental Meditation" by the Beach Boys features a mezzo-soprano saxophone played by Tom Scott.

The 2025 art-pop single "Quench" by Yulan & Blaise features an F mezzo-soprano saxophone solo.
