= Saxophone =

Single-reed woodwind instrument

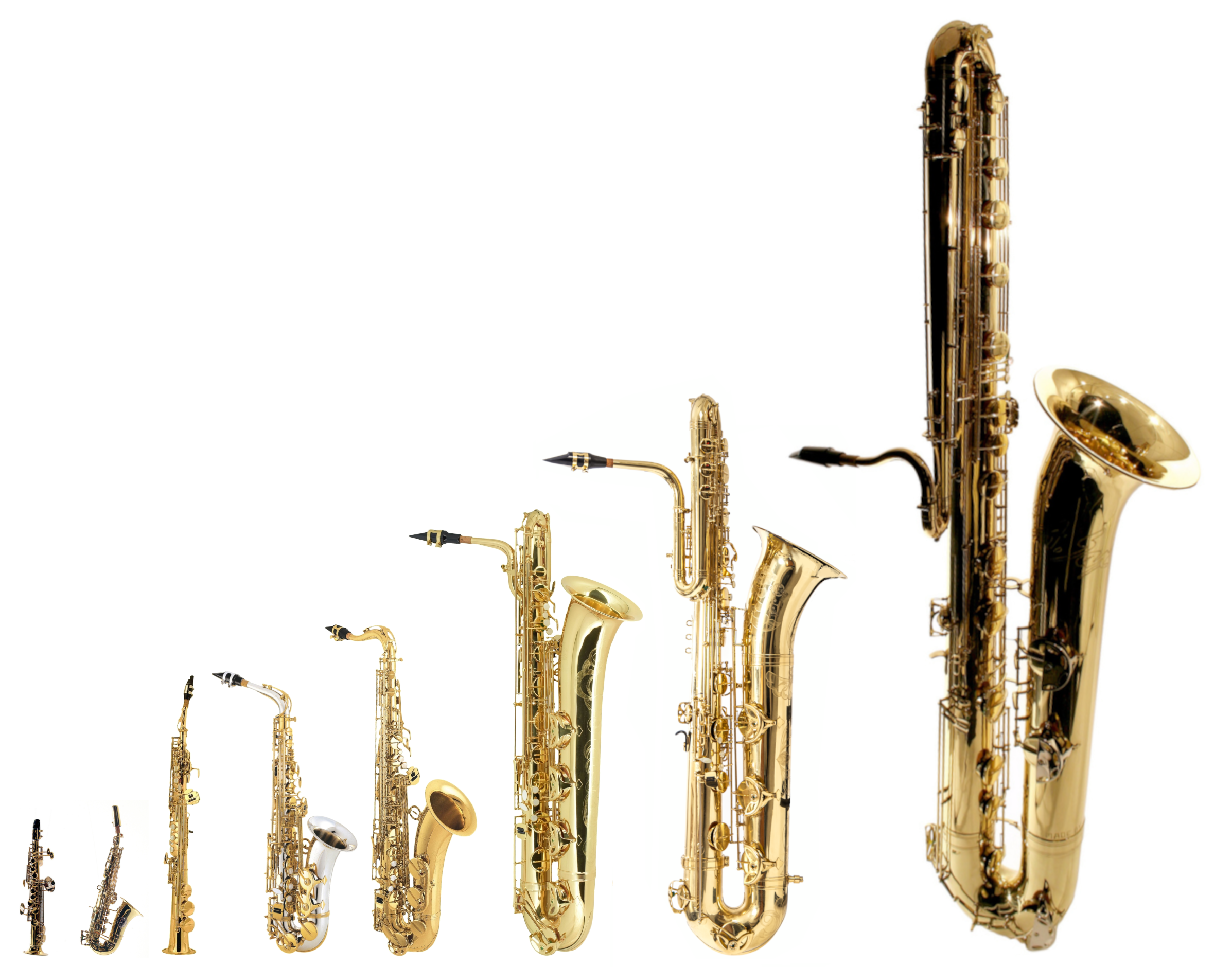
- Saxophone family, from soprillo (left) to contrabass (right)

Woodwind instrument
- Classification: Single-reed
- Hornbostel–Sachs classification: 422.212-71 (Single-reed aerophone with keys)
- Inventor: Adolphe Sax
- Developed: 1840s

Playing range
- Most saxophones share the same written range in treble clef of just over two and a half octaves. Most can reach higher notes using altissimo fingerings.

Related instruments
- Sizes: Soprillo; sopranino; soprano; alto; tenor; baritone; bass; contrabass; subcontrabass; Orchestral saxophones: C soprano; mezzo-soprano; C melody; Specialty saxophones: Aulochrome; tubax

Musicians
- See list of saxophonists

The saxophone (often referred to colloquially as the sax) is a type of single-reed woodwind instrument with a conical body, usually made of brass. As with all single-reed instruments, sound is produced when a reed on a mouthpiece vibrates to produce a sound wave inside the instrument's body. The pitch is controlled by opening and closing holes in the body to change the effective length of the tube. The holes are closed by leather pads attached to keys operated by the player. Saxophones are made in various sizes and are almost always treated as transposing instruments. A person who plays the saxophone is called a saxophonist or saxist.

The saxophone is used in a wide range of musical styles, including classical music (such as concert bands, chamber music, solo repertoire, and occasionally orchestras), military bands, marching bands, jazz (such as big bands and jazz combos), and contemporary music. The saxophone is also used as a solo and melody instrument or as a member of a horn section in some styles of rock and roll and popular music.

The saxophone was invented by the Belgian instrument maker Adolphe Sax in the early 1840s and was patented on 28 June 1846. Sax invented two groups of seven instruments each—one group contained instruments in C and F, and the other group contained instruments in B♭ and E♭. The B♭ and E♭ instruments soon became dominant, and most saxophones encountered today are from this series. Instruments from the series pitched in C and F never gained a foothold and constituted only a small fraction of instruments made by Sax. High-pitch (also marked "H" or "HP") saxophones tuned sharper than the (concert) A = 440 Hz standard were produced into the early twentieth century for sonic qualities suited for outdoor use, but are not playable to modern tuning and are considered obsolete. Low-pitch (also marked "L" or "LP") saxophones are equivalent in tuning to modern instruments. C soprano and C melody saxophones were produced for the casual market as parlor instruments during the early twentieth century, and saxophones in F were introduced during the late 1920s but never gained acceptance.

The modern saxophone family consists entirely of B♭ and E♭ instruments. The saxophones in widest use are the B♭ soprano, E♭ alto, B♭ tenor, and E♭ baritone. The E♭ sopranino and B♭ bass saxophone are typically used in larger saxophone choir settings, when available.

In the table below, consecutive members of each family are pitched an octave apart.

#	B♭ family	E♭ family
1 (highest)	Soprillo (piccolo)	—
2	—	Sopranino
3	Soprano	—
4	—	Alto
5	Tenor	—
6	—	Baritone
7	Bass	—
8	—	Contrabass
9 (lowest)	Subcontrabass	—

== Description ==
A saxophone song with electric piano and drums in the background

=== Construction ===
The pitch of a saxophone is controlled by opening or closing the tone holes along the body of the instrument to change the length of the vibrating air column. The tone holes are closed by leather pads connected to keys—most are operated by the player's fingers, but some are operated using the palm or the side of a finger. There is an octave (register) key, which raises the pitch of the lower notes by one octave. The lowest note on most modern saxophones is the written B♭ below middle C. Nearly all baritone saxophones are now constructed with an extra key to allow them to play low A, and a small number of altos with a low A key have been manufactured. The highest keyed note has traditionally been the F two and a half octaves above the low B♭, but many instruments now have an extra key for a high F♯, and some modern soprano saxophones even have a high G key. Notes above this are part of the altissimo register and require advanced embouchure techniques and fingering combinations.

Saxophone music is written in treble clef, appropriately transposed for each different type of instrument, and all saxophones use the same key arrangement and fingerings. Therefore, any written note corresponds to the same fingering on any saxophone, making it easier for players to switch between instruments.

Alto and larger saxophones have a detachable curved neck at the top and a U-shaped bend (the bow) that turns the tubing upward as it approaches the bell. Soprano and sopranino saxophones are usually constructed without a detachable neck or a bow; however, some have a small detachable neck and some are shaped like an alto saxophone with a bow section. There are rare examples of alto, tenor, and baritone saxophones with mostly straight bodies. Baritone, bass, and contrabass saxophones have extra bends to accommodate the length of tubing. The fingering system for the saxophone is similar to the systems used for the oboe, the Boehm-system clarinet, and the flute.

=== Materials ===
From the earliest days of the saxophone, the body and key cups have been made from sheet brass stock, which can be worked into complex shapes. The keywork is manufactured from other types of brass stock. King made saxophones with necks and bells of sterling silver from the 1930s into the early 1960s. Yanagisawa revived this idea in the 1980s and later introduced instruments entirely made of sterling silver. Keilwerth and P. Mauriat have used nickel silver, a copper-nickel-zinc alloy more commonly used for flutes, for the bodies of some saxophone models. For visual and tonal effect, higher copper variants of brass are sometimes substituted for the more common "yellow brass" and "cartridge brass". Yanagisawa made its 902 and 992 series saxophones with the high copper alloy phosphor bronze to achieve a "darker", more "vintage" tone than the brass 901 and 991 models.

Other materials are used for some mechanical parts and keywork. Buttons where the fingers contact the keys are usually made from plastic or, traditionally, mother of pearl. Rods, screw pins, and springs are usually made of blued or stainless steel. Mechanical buffers of felt, cork, leather, and various synthetic materials are used to minimize mechanical noise from key movement and to optimize the action of the keywork. Nickel silver is sometimes used for hinges for its advantages of mechanical durability, although the most common material for such applications has remained brass.

Manufacturers usually apply a finish to the surface of the instrument's body and keywork. The most common finish is a thin coating of clear or colored acrylic lacquer to protect the brass from oxidation and maintain a shiny appearance. Silver or gold plating are offered as options on some models. Some silver plated saxophones are also lacquered. Plating saxophones with gold is an expensive process as an underplating of silver is required for the gold to adhere to. Nickel plating has been used on the bodies of early budget model saxophones and is commonly used on keywork when a more durable finish is desired, mostly with student model saxophones. Chemical surface treatment of the base metal has come into use as an alternative to the lacquer and plating finishes in recent years.

=== Mouthpiece and reed ===
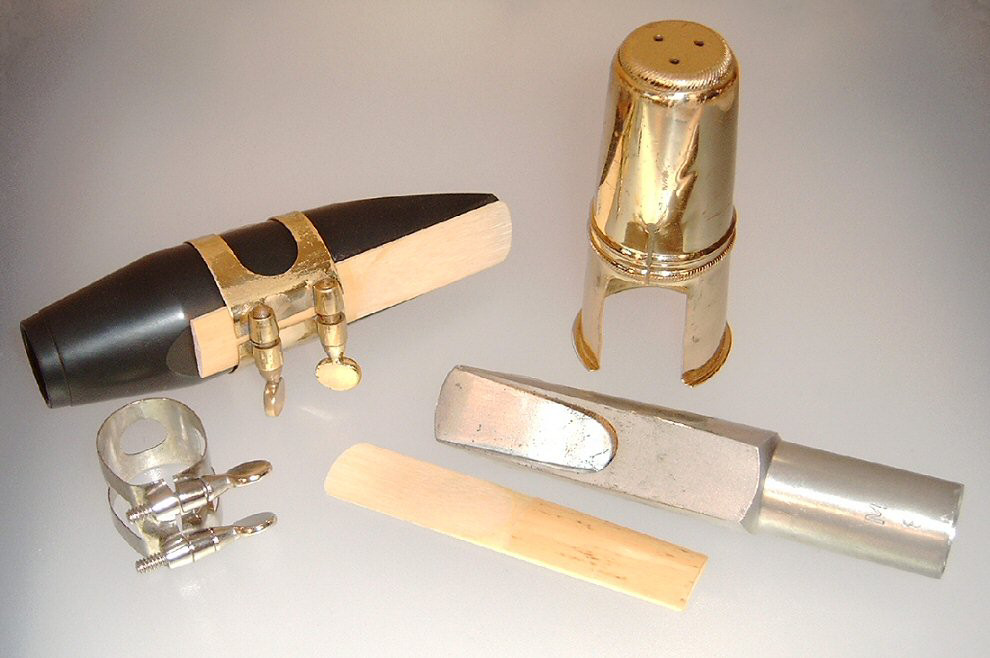
Tenor saxophone mouthpieces, ligatures, reed, and cap

The saxophone uses a single-reed mouthpiece similar to that of the clarinet. Each size of saxophone (alto, tenor, etc.) uses a different size of reed and mouthpiece.

Most saxophonists use reeds made from Arundo donax cane, but since the middle of the twentieth century some have been made of fiberglass or other composite materials. Saxophone reeds are proportioned slightly differently from clarinet reeds, being wider for the same length. Commercial reeds vary in hardness and design, and single-reed players try different reeds to find those that suit their mouthpiece, embouchure, and playing style.

Mouthpiece design has a profound impact on tone (timbre), but there is a lack of quantified data on mouthpiece timbre, and different players may have different perceptions of a "bright" or "dark" sound. In a 1972 study where performers ranked mouthpieces on a scale from "dark-mellow" to "edgy-bright", the "darkest" mouthpiece yielded a spectrum with a strong fundamental frequency, most of the energy concentrated in the lower harmonics, and a progressive decrease in strength across the higher harmonics. A sound characterized as "richer" featured more energy in the slightly higher harmonics, with less energy in the 2nd and 4th. In general, "brighter" mouthpieces tended to feature higher harmonics that did not decrease smoothly in energy. Different mouthpiece design characteristics and features tend to be favored for different styles. Early mouthpieces were designed to produce a "warm" and "round" sound for classical playing. Among classical mouthpieces, those with a concave ("excavated") chamber are truer to Adolphe Sax's original design; these provide a softer or less piercing tone favored by the Raschèr school of classical playing. Saxophonists who follow the French school of classical playing, influenced by Marcel Mule, generally use mouthpieces with smaller chambers for a somewhat "brighter" sound with relatively more upper harmonics. The use of the saxophone in dance orchestras and jazz ensembles from the 1920s onward placed emphasis on dynamic range and projection, leading to innovation in mouthpiece designs. At the opposite extreme from the classical mouthpieces are those with a small chamber and a low clearance above the reed between the tip and the chamber, called high baffle. These produce a "bright" sound with maximum projection, suitable for having a sound stand out among amplified instruments.

Mouthpieces come in a wide variety of materials, including vulcanized rubber (sometimes called hard rubber or ebonite), plastic, and metals like bronze or surgical stainless steel. Less common materials that have been used include wood, glass, crystal, porcelain, and bone. Recently, Delrin has been added to the variety of mouthpiece materials.

The effect of mouthpiece materials on tone of the saxophone has been the subject of much debate. According to Larry Teal, the mouthpiece material has little, if any, effect on the sound, and the physical dimensions give a mouthpiece its tone color. There are examples of "dark" sounding metal pieces and "bright" sounding hard rubber or polycarbonate pieces. The extra bulk required near the tip with hard rubber affects mouth position and airflow characteristics.

== History ==
=== Early development and adoption ===
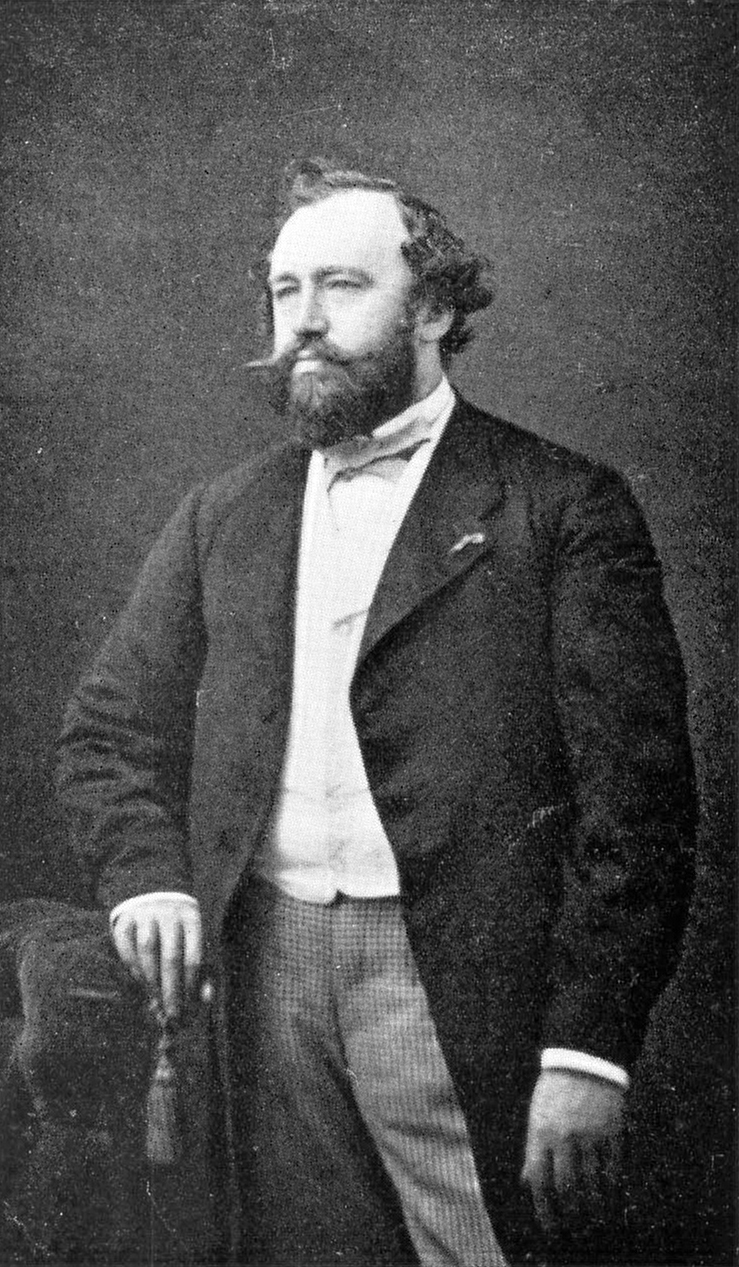
Adolphe Sax, the inventor of the saxophone

The saxophone was designed around 1840 by Adolphe Sax, a Belgian instrument maker, flautist, and clarinetist. Born in Dinant and originally based in Brussels, he moved to Paris in 1842 to establish his musical instrument business. Before working on the saxophone, he made several improvements to the bass clarinet by improving its keywork and acoustics and extending its lower range. Sax was also a maker of the ophicleide, a large conical brass instrument in the bass register with keys similar to a woodwind instrument. His experience with these two instruments allowed him to develop the skills and technologies needed to make the first saxophones.

As an outgrowth of his work improving the bass clarinet, Sax began developing an instrument with the projection of a brass instrument and the agility of a woodwind. He wanted it to overblow at the octave, unlike the clarinet, which rises in pitch by a twelfth when overblown. An instrument that overblows at the octave has identical fingering for both registers.

Sax created an instrument with a single-reed mouthpiece and conical brass body. Having constructed saxophones in several sizes in the early 1840s, Sax applied for, and received, a 15-year patent for the instrument on 28 June 1846. The patent encompassed 14 versions of the fundamental design, split into two categories of seven instruments each, and ranging from sopranino to contrabass. A limited number of instruments in the series pitched in F and C were produced by Sax, but the series pitched in E♭ and B♭ quickly became the standard. All the instruments were given an initial written range from the B below the treble staff to the E♭ one half-step below the third ledger line above staff, giving each saxophone a range of two and a half octaves. Sax's patent expired in 1866. Thereafter, numerous other instrument manufacturers implemented their own improvements to the design and keywork.

Sax's original keywork, which was based on the Triébert-system oboe for the left hand and the Boehm-system clarinet for the right, was simplistic and made certain legato passages and wide intervals extremely difficult to finger; that system was later improved with extra keys, linkage mechanisms, and alternate fingerings.

Early in the development of the saxophone, the upper keyed range was extended to E, then to F above the staff; 1880s era sheet music for saxophone was written for the range of low B to F. In 1887, the Buffet Crampon company obtained a patent for extending the bell and adding an extra key to extend the range downwards by one semitone to B♭. This extension is standard in modern designs, with the notable exception of baritone saxophones which have keys down to low A. The upper keyed range to F remained the standard for nearly a century until a high F♯ key became common on modern saxophones.

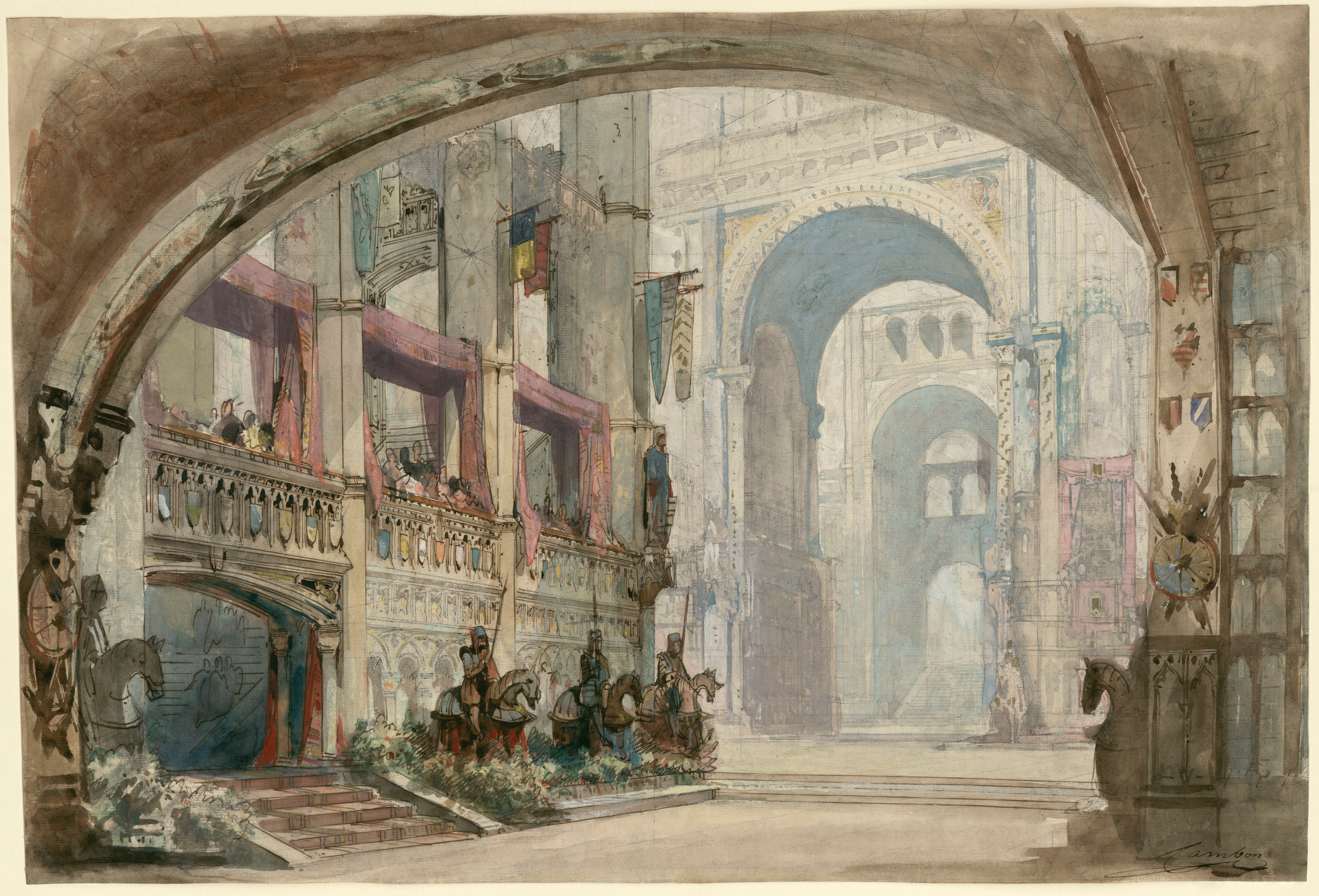
In a rare early inclusion in an orchestral score, the saxophone was used in Gioachino Rossini's Robert Bruce (1846)

In the 1840s and 1850s, Sax's invention gained use in small classical ensembles (both all-saxophone and mixed), as a solo instrument, and in French and British military bands. Saxophone method books were published and saxophone instruction was offered at conservatories in France, Switzerland, Belgium, Spain, and Italy. By 1856, the French Garde Republicaine band was the largest ensemble of its time to prominently feature the instrument, using eight saxophones. The saxophone was used experimentally in orchestral scores, but never came into widespread use as an orchestral instrument. In 1853–54, the orchestra of Louis-Antoine Jullien featured a soprano saxophone on a concert tour of the United States.

After an early period of interest and support from classical music communities in Europe, interest in the saxophone as a classical instrument waned in the late nineteenth century. Saxophone teaching at the Paris Conservatory was suspended from 1870 to 1900 and classical saxophone repertoire stagnated during that period. But it was during this same period that the saxophone began to be promoted in the United States, largely through the efforts of Patrick Gilmore, bandleader for the 22nd Regiment of the New York State National Guard, and Edward A. Lefebre, a Dutch émigré and saxophonist who had family business associations with Sax. Lefebre settled in New York in early 1872 after he arrived as a clarinetist with a British opera company. Gilmore organized the World's Peace Jubilee and International Music Festival taking place in Boston that summer. The Garde Républicaine band performed, and Lefebre was a clarinetist with the Great Festival Orchestra for that event. In the fall of 1873, Gilmore was reorganizing the 22nd Regiment band under the influence of the Garde Republicaine band and recruited Lefebre, who had established a reputation in New York as a saxophonist over the previous year. Gilmore's band soon featured a soprano–alto–tenor–baritone saxophone section, which also performed as a quartet. The Gilmore–Lefebre association lasted until Gilmore's death in 1892, during which time Lefebre also performed in smaller ensembles of various sizes and instrumentation, and worked with composers to increase light classical and popular repertoire for saxophone.

Lefebre's later promotional efforts were very significant in broadening the adoption of the saxophone. Starting near the end of the 1880s, he consulted with the brass instrument manufacturer C. G. Conn to develop and start production of improved saxophones to replace the costly, scarce, and mechanically unreliable European instruments that were in the American market. The early 1890s saw regular production of saxophones commence at Conn and its offshoot Buescher Manufacturing Company, which dramatically increased the availability of saxophones in the US. Lefebre worked with the music publisher Carl Fischer to distribute his transcriptions, arrangements, and original works for saxophone, and worked with the Conn Conservatory to further saxophone pedagogy in the US. Lefebre's associations with Conn and Fischer lasted into the first decade of the twentieth century, and Fischer continued to publish new arrangements of Lefebre's works after his death.

=== Early twentieth-century growth and development ===
While the saxophone remained marginal, used mainly as a novelty instrument in the classical world, many new musical niches were established for it during the early decades of the twentieth century. Its early use in vaudeville and ragtime bands around the turn of the century laid the groundwork for its use in dance orchestras and eventually jazz. As the market for saxophones grew in the US, the manufacturing industry grew. The Martin Band Instrument Company started producing saxophones between 1905 and 1912, and the Cleveland Band Instrument Company started producing saxophones under contract to the H. N. White Company in 1916. The saxophone was promoted for the casual market with the introduction of the C soprano (slightly higher than the regular soprano) and C melody (between alto and tenor) saxophones, both pitched in C to enable them to play from piano music (without the need to transpose). Production of such instruments stopped during the Great Depression. During the 1920s, the saxophone came into use as a jazz instrument. Starting in the late 1920s and early 1930s, the modern era of classical saxophone was launched largely through the efforts of Marcel Mule and Sigurd Raschèr, and the classical repertoire for the instrument expanded rapidly.

The use of the saxophone for more dynamic and more technically demanding styles of playing added incentive for improvements in keywork and acoustic design. Early saxophones had two separate octave keys operated by the left thumb to control the two octave vents required on alto or larger saxophones. Around the turn of the century, mechanisms were developed to operate both octave vents with a single key using the left thumb. Ergonomic design of keywork evolved rapidly during the 1920s and 1930s. The front F mechanism supporting alternate fingerings for high E and F, and a stack-linked G♯ key action, became standard during the 1920s, followed by improvements to the left-hand table key mechanisms controlling G♯ and the bell keys. New bore designs during the 1920s and 1930s resulted from the quest for improved intonation, dynamic response, and tonal qualities. The 1920s were also an era of design experiments like the Buescher straight altos and tenors, the King Saxello soprano, the C. G. Conn mezzo-soprano saxophone keyed in F, and the Conn-O-Sax saxophone–English horn hybrid.

French saxophonist and educator Jean-Marie Londeix greatly expanded the saxophone repertoire and available techniques in the second half of the 20th century, commissioning a great deal of new saxophone works with extended techniques, including those by Denisov, Lauba, Rossé, and Rolin.

=== Modern saxophone emerges ===
The modern layout of the saxophone emerged during the 1930s and 1940s, first with right-side bell keys introduced by C. G. Conn on baritones, then by King on altos and tenors. The mechanics of the left hand table were revolutionized by Selmer with their Balanced Action instruments in 1936, capitalizing on the right-side bell key layout. In 1948, Selmer introduced their Super Action saxophones (often referred to as the "Super Balanced Action" to distinguish it from the later Super Action 80 model) with offset left and right hand stack keys. Thirty to forty years later, this 1948 Selmer layout became nearly universal.

The high F♯ key was also first introduced as an option on the Balanced Action model, although it took several decades for it to gain acceptance because of perceived deleterious effects on intonation.

Marcel Mule established study of the saxophone as a classical instrument at the Conservatoire de Paris from the 1940s. Larry Teal did the same in the United States at the University of Michigan a decade later. A number of other American institutions have since become recognized homes for the study of classical saxophone. They include Northwestern University, Indiana University, and the Eastman School of Music.

== Usage ==
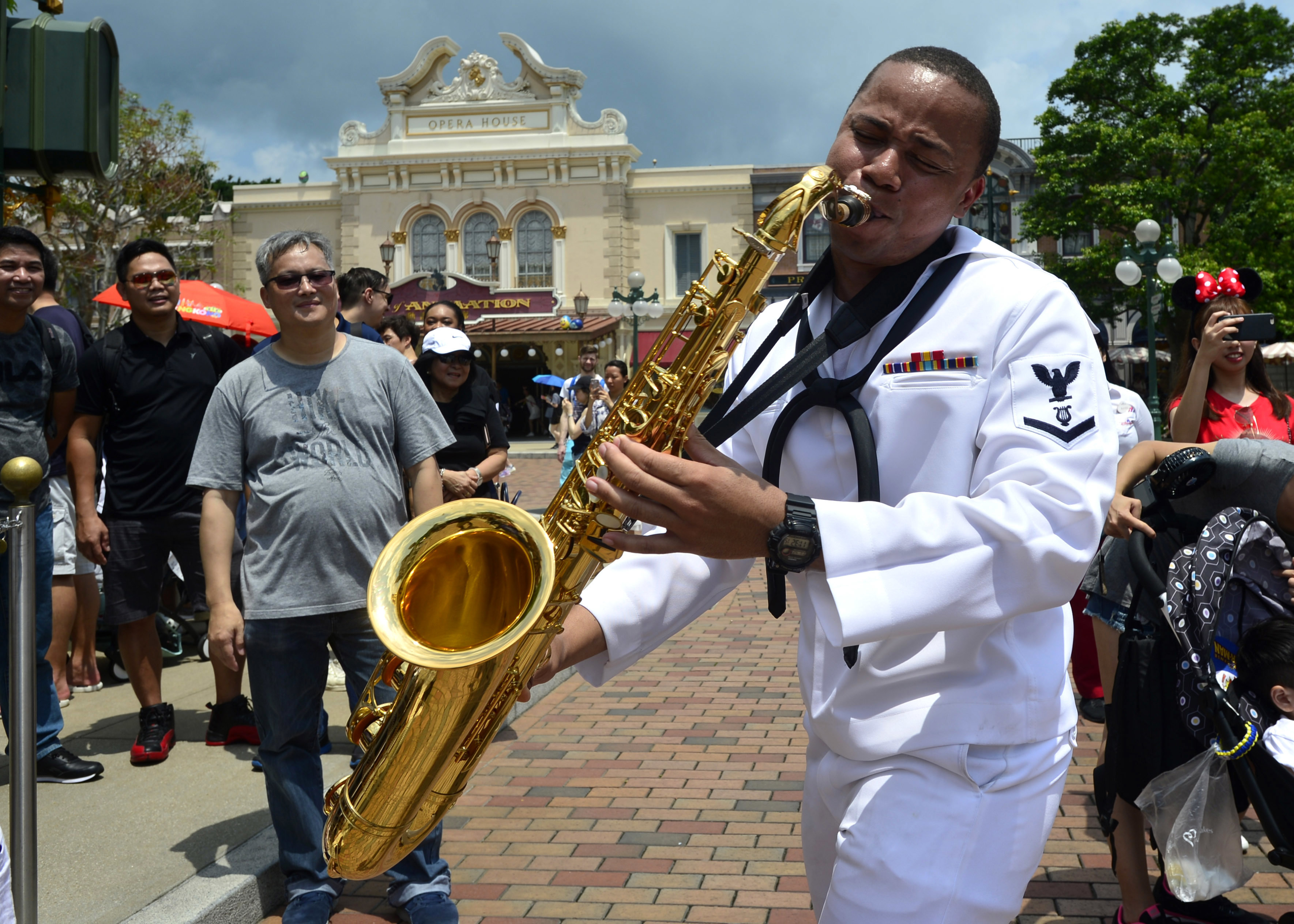
A US Seventh Fleet Band sailor with a tenor saxophone in Hong Kong

=== In military bands ===
The saxophone first gained popularity in military bands. Although the instrument was initially ignored in Germany, French and Belgian military bands were quick to include it in their ensembles. Most French and Belgian military bands incorporate at least a quartet of saxophones, comprising a B♭ soprano, E♭ alto, B♭ tenor, and E♭ baritone. These four instruments have proven the most popular of all Sax's creations with the E♭ contrabass and B♭ bass usually considered impractically large and E♭ sopranino insufficiently powerful. British military bands tend to include at minimum two saxophonists on alto and tenor.

=== In classical music ===
The saxophone was introduced into the concert band, which usually calls for two E♭ alto saxophones, a B♭ tenor saxophone, and an E♭ baritone saxophone. A B♭ soprano saxophone is also sometimes used and is played by the first alto saxophonist. A B♭ bass saxophone is used in some older or larger concert band works (especially in the music of Percy Grainger).

Classical saxophonist Sigurd Raschèr

Saxophones are used in chamber music, such as saxophone quartets and other chamber combinations of instruments. The classical saxophone quartet consists of a B♭ soprano saxophone, E♭ alto saxophone, B♭ tenor saxophone, and E♭ baritone saxophone (SATB). On occasion, the soprano is replaced with a second alto sax (AATB); a few professional saxophone quartets have featured non-standard instrumentation, such as James Fei's Alto Quartet (four altos).

There is a repertoire of classical compositions and arrangements for the SATB instrumentation dating back to the nineteenth century, particularly by French composers who knew Sax. However, the largest body of chamber works for saxophone are from the modern era of classical saxophone initiated by Marcel Mule in 1928. Sigurd Raschèr followed as a soloist in orchestral works, starting in 1931, and also figured prominently in development of modern classical saxophone repertoire. The Mule quartet is often considered the prototype for quartets due to the level of virtuosity demonstrated by its members and its central role in the development of modern quartet repertoire. However, organized quartets existed before Mule's ensemble, the prime example being the quartet headed by Edward A. Lefebre (1834–1911), which was a subset of Patrick Gilmore's 22nd Regiment band between 1873 and 1893.

In the 20th and 21st centuries, the saxophone found increased popularity in symphony orchestras. The instrument has also been used in opera and choral music. Musical theatre scores also can include parts for saxophone, sometimes doubling another woodwind or brass instrument.

==== Selected works of the repertoire ====
- Fantasie sur un thème original (1860)—Jules Demersseman
- Rapsodie pour orchestre et saxophone (1901)—Claude Debussy
- Légende, symphonic suite for chromatic harp, alto saxophone and strings (1903)–André Caplet
- Choral varié, Op.55 (1903)—Vincent d'Indy
- Impressions d'automne, Elegy for alto saxophone, oboe, 2 clarinets, basson, harp, organ and 2 cellos (1905)–André Caplet
- Légende, Op.66 (1918)—Florent Schmitt
- Saxophone Concerto (1934)—Lars-Erik Larsson
- Concerto in E♭ major for alto saxophone and orchestra (1934)
  —Alexander Glazunov
- Concertino da camera (1935)—Jacques Ibert
- Aria pour saxophone alto (1936)—Eugène Bozza
- Sonata for alto saxophone and piano (1937)—Bernhard Heiden
- Scaramouche for alto saxophone and piano (1937)—Darius Milhaud
- Ballade for Alto Saxophone (1938)—Henri Tomasi
- Sonata for alto saxophone and piano, Op. 19 (1939)—Paul Creston
- Sonata for alto saxophone and piano (1943)—Paul Hindemith
- Concerto for alto saxophone and orchestra, Op. 26 (1944)—Paul Creston
- Concerto for alto saxophone and orchestra (1948)—Ingolf Dahl
- Fantasia for saxophone, three horns, and strings (1948)—Heitor Villa-Lobos
- Concerto for alto saxophone and orchestra (1949)—Henri Tomasi
- Tableaux de Provence (1955)—Paule Maurice
- Prélude, cadence et finale (1956)—Alfred Desenclos
- Saxophone Concerto (1958)—Erland von Koch
- Concerto for alto saxophone and orchestra (1959)—Pierre Max Dubois
- Élégie et rondeau pour saxophone alto et orchestre (1961)—Karel Husa
- Sonata for alto saxophone (1970)—Edison Denisov
- Sonata for alto saxophone and piano, Op. 29 (1970)—Robert Muczynski
- Fantasia on Auld Lang Syne for 16 saxophones (1976)—Ernest Tomlinson
- Panic for alto saxophone, jazz drum kit, winds and percussion (1995)—Harrison Birtwistle
- Concerto for Saxophone Quartet (1995)—Philip Glass
- Because It Has a Song (2010) - James Barger
- Concerto for Alto Saxophone and Orchestra (2013)—John Adams

==== Selected saxophone quartets ====
- Premier Quatuor [Quartet No. 1], Op. 53 (1857) — Jean-Baptiste Singelée
- Quartette [Quartet] (1879) — Caryl Florio
- Saxophone Quartet in B♭, Op.109 (1932) — Alexander Glazunov
- Introduction et variations sur une ronde populaire (1934) — Gabriel Pierné
- Andante et Scherzo for saxophone quartet (1938) — Eugène Bozza
- Variations Saxophoniques (1939) – Fernande Decruck
- Quatuor pour Saxophones [Quartet for Saxophones], Op. 102 (1939)
  — Florent Schmitt
- Quatuor pour Saxophones [Quartet for Saxophones] (1956)
  — Pierre Max Dubois
- Quatuor [Quartet] (1962) — Alfred Desenclos
- Suite for Saxophone Quartet (1979) — Paul Creston
- Just for Show (1985) — Lennie Niehaus
- Pollywog's Lake Talk (1986) — Barry Ulman
- XAS (1987) — Iannis Xenakis
- Back Burner (1989) — Frank Ticheli
- Recitation Book (2006) — David Maslanka
- Strange Humors (2008) — John Mackey (composer)
- Black (2012) — Marc Mellits
- Polar Vortex (2014) — Chris Evan Hass
- In Memoriam (2015) — Joel Love
- Volcanic Ash (2017) — Chris Evan Hass
- Altera (2017) — Max Gray
- Impressions (2020) — Randy Stagich

==== Selected chamber-music pieces with saxophone ====
- Nonet (1923) – Heitor Villa-Lobos
- Chôros No. 7 (1924) – Heitor Villa-Lobos
- Chôros No. 3 (1925) – Heitor Villa-Lobos
- Quartet for clarinet, tenor saxophone, violin, and piano, Op. 22 (1930)
  – Anton Webern
- The Flowering Peach, Op. 125, for clarinet, saxophone, percussion (timpani, tam-tam, vibraphone, glockenspiel), harp and celesta (1954)
  – Alan Hovhaness
- Prometheus for flute, oboe, cor anglais, clarinet, saxophone, and bassoon (1967) – Brian Ferneyhough
- Erwachen, Nr. 92 (2007) – Karlheinz Stockhausen

==== Selected orchestral pieces with saxophones ====
- L'Arlésienne (1872) – Georges Bizet
- Sylvia (1876) – Léo Delibes
- Symphonia Domestica (1904) – Richard Strauss
- The Wooden Prince (1917) – Béla Bartók
- Pictures at an Exhibition (1922 Ravel version)
  – Modest Mussorgsky/Maurice Ravel
- Boléro (1928) – Maurice Ravel
- La création du monde (1923) – Darius Milhaud
- Symphony No. 4 (1924) – Charles Ives
- Rhapsody in Blue (1924) – George Gershwin
- Chôros No. 8 (1925) – Heitor Villa-Lobos
- Háry János (1926) – Zoltán Kodály
- Chôros No. 10 (1926) – Heitor Villa-Lobos
- Piano Concerto (1926) – Aaron Copland
- An American in Paris (1928) – George Gershwin
- Symphony No. 1 (1928) – Aaron Copland
- Der Wein (1929) – Alban Berg
- The Golden Age (1930) – Dmitri Shostakovich
- Belshazzar's Feast (1931) – William Walton
- Job: A Masque for Dancing (1931) – Ralph Vaughan Williams
- Suite No. 1 (1931) – Dmitri Shostakovich
- Uirapuru (1934) – Heitor Villa-Lobos
- Lieutenant Kijé (1934) – Sergei Prokofiev
- Violin Concerto (1935) – Alban Berg
- Suite No. 2 (1938) – Dmitri Shostakovich
- Romeo and Juliet (1938) – Sergei Prokofiev
- Alexander Nevsky (1938) – Sergei Prokofiev
- Symphonic Dances (1940) – Sergei Rachmaninoff
- Sinfonia da Requiem (1940) – Benjamin Britten
- Chôros No. 11 (1928–41) – Heitor Villa-Lobos
- Chôros No. 6 (1925–42) – Heitor Villa-Lobos
- Chôros No. 12 (1925–45) – Heitor Villa-Lobos
- Symphony No. 6 (1947) – Ralph Vaughan Williams
- On the Waterfront (1954) – Leonard Bernstein
- Symphony No. 9 (1957) – Ralph Vaughan Williams
- Suite for Variety Orchestra (post-1956) – Dmitri Shostakovich
- The Prince of the Pagodas (1957) – Benjamin Britten
- Gruppen (1955–57) – Karlheinz Stockhausen
- Carré (1959–60) – Karlheinz Stockhausen
- Déclarations d'orage for reciter, soprano, baritone, three improvising instruments (alto saxophone, tuba, synthesizer), large orchestra and tape (1988–89) – Henri Pousseur
- City Noir (2009) – John Adams

==== Selected operas and musicals with saxophones ====
- Le Roi de Lahore (1877) Jules Massenet
- Hérodiade (1881) – Jules Massenet
- Werther (1892) – Jules Massenet
- Turandot (1926) – Giacomo Puccini
- Jonny spielt auf (1927) – Ernst Krenek
- Neues vom Tage (1929) – Paul Hindemith
- Lulu (1937) – Alban Berg
- Billy Budd (1951) – Benjamin Britten
- West Side Story (1957) – Leonard Bernstein
- We Come to the River (1976) – Hans Werner Henze
- Samstag aus Licht (1984) – Karlheinz Stockhausen
- Nixon in China (1987) – John Adams

=== In jazz and popular music ===
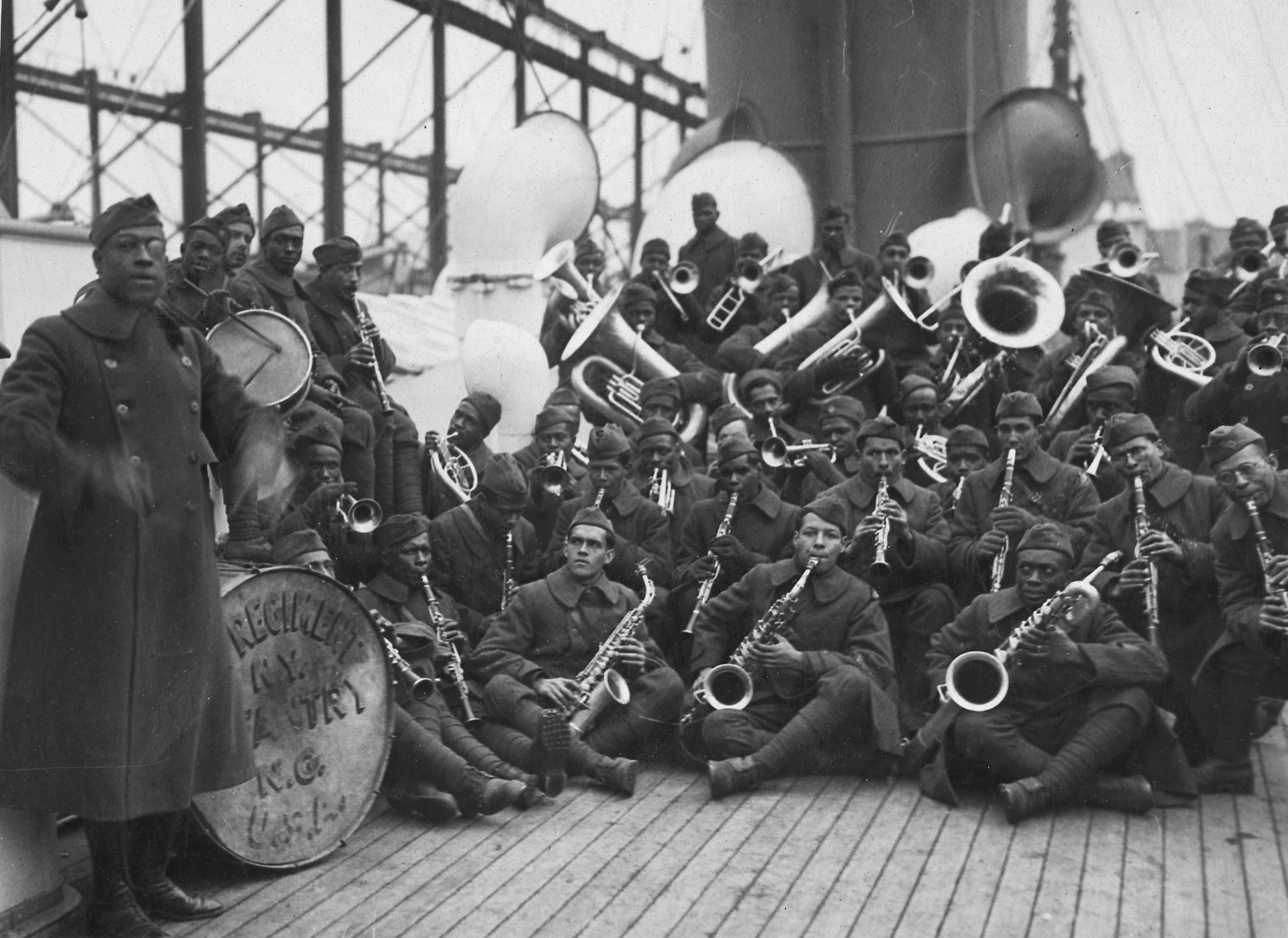
SS Stockholm, 369th Infantry Regiment Band and leader Lt. James Reese in Europe, winter 1918–1919

Coincident with the more widespread availability of saxophones in the US around the turn of the century was the rise of ragtime music. The bands featuring the syncopated African-American rhythmic influences of ragtime were an exciting new feature of the American cultural landscape and provided the groundwork for new styles of dancing. Two of the best known ragtime-playing brass bands with saxophones were those led by W. C. Handy and James Reese Europe. Europe's 369th Infantry Regiment Band popularized ragtime in France during its 1918 tour. The rise of dance bands into the 1920s followed from the popularity of ragtime. The saxophone was also used in vaudeville entertainment during the same period. Ragtime, vaudeville, and dance bands introduced much of the American public to the saxophone. Rudy Wiedoeft became the best known individual saxophone stylist and virtuoso during this period leading into the "saxophone craze" of the 1920s. Following it, the saxophone became featured in music as diverse as the "sweet" music of Paul Whiteman and Guy Lombardo, jazz, swing, and large stage show bands.

The rise of the saxophone as a jazz instrument followed its widespread adoption in dance bands during the early 1920s. The Fletcher Henderson Orchestra, formed in 1923, featured arrangements to back up improvisation, bringing the first elements of jazz to the large dance band format. Following the innovations of the Fletcher Henderson Orchestra, the Duke Ellington Orchestra and Jean Goldkette's Victor Recording Orchestra featured jazz solos with saxophones and other instruments. The association of dance bands with jazz would reach its peak with the swing music of the 1930s. The large show band format, influenced by the 1930s swing bands, would be used as backing for popular vocalists and stage shows in the post–World War II era and provided a foundation for big band jazz. Show bands with saxophone sections became a staple of television talk shows (such as The Tonight Show that featured bands led by Doc Severinsen and Branford Marsalis) and Las Vegas stage shows. The swing era fostered the later saxophone styles that permeated bebop and rhythm and blues in the early postwar era.

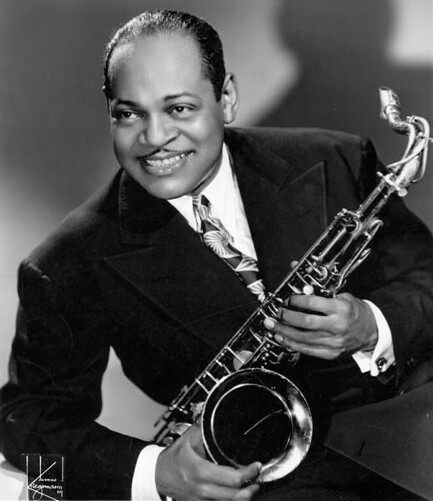
Coleman Hawkins, the most influential saxophone stylist of jazz's early period, c. 1945

Coleman Hawkins established the tenor saxophone as a jazz solo instrument during his stint with Fletcher Henderson from 1923 to 1934. Hawkins's arpeggiated, rich-toned, vibrato-laden style was the main influence on swing era tenor players before Lester Young, and his influence continued with other big-toned tenor players into the era of modern jazz. Among the tenor players directly influenced by him were Chu Berry, Charlie Barnet, Tex Beneke, Ben Webster, Vido Musso, Herschel Evans, Buddy Tate, and Don Byas. Hawkins's bandmate Benny Carter and Duke Ellington's alto saxophonist Johnny Hodges became influential on swing era alto styles, while Harry Carney brought the baritone saxophone to prominence with the Duke Ellington Orchestra. The New Orleans player Sidney Bechet gained recognition for playing the soprano saxophone during the 1920s, but the instrument did not come into wide use until the modern era of jazz.

As Chicago style jazz evolved from New Orleans (Dixieland) jazz in the 1920s, one of its defining features was the addition of saxophones to the ensemble. The small Chicago ensembles offered more improvisational freedom than did the New Orleans or large band formats, fostering the innovations of saxophonists Jimmy Dorsey (alto), Frankie Trumbauer (C melody), Bud Freeman (tenor) and Stump Evans (baritone). Dorsey and Trumbauer became important influences on tenor saxophonist Lester Young.

Lester Young's approach on tenor saxophone differed from Hawkins's, emphasizing more melodic "linear" playing that wove in and out of the chordal structure and longer phrases that differed from those suggested by the tune. He used vibrato less, fitting it to the passage he was playing. His tone was "smoother" and "darker" than that of his 1930s contemporaries. Young's playing was a major influence on the modern jazz saxophonists Al Cohn, Stan Getz, Zoot Sims, Dexter Gordon, Wardell Gray, Lee Konitz, Warne Marsh, Charlie Parker, and Art Pepper.

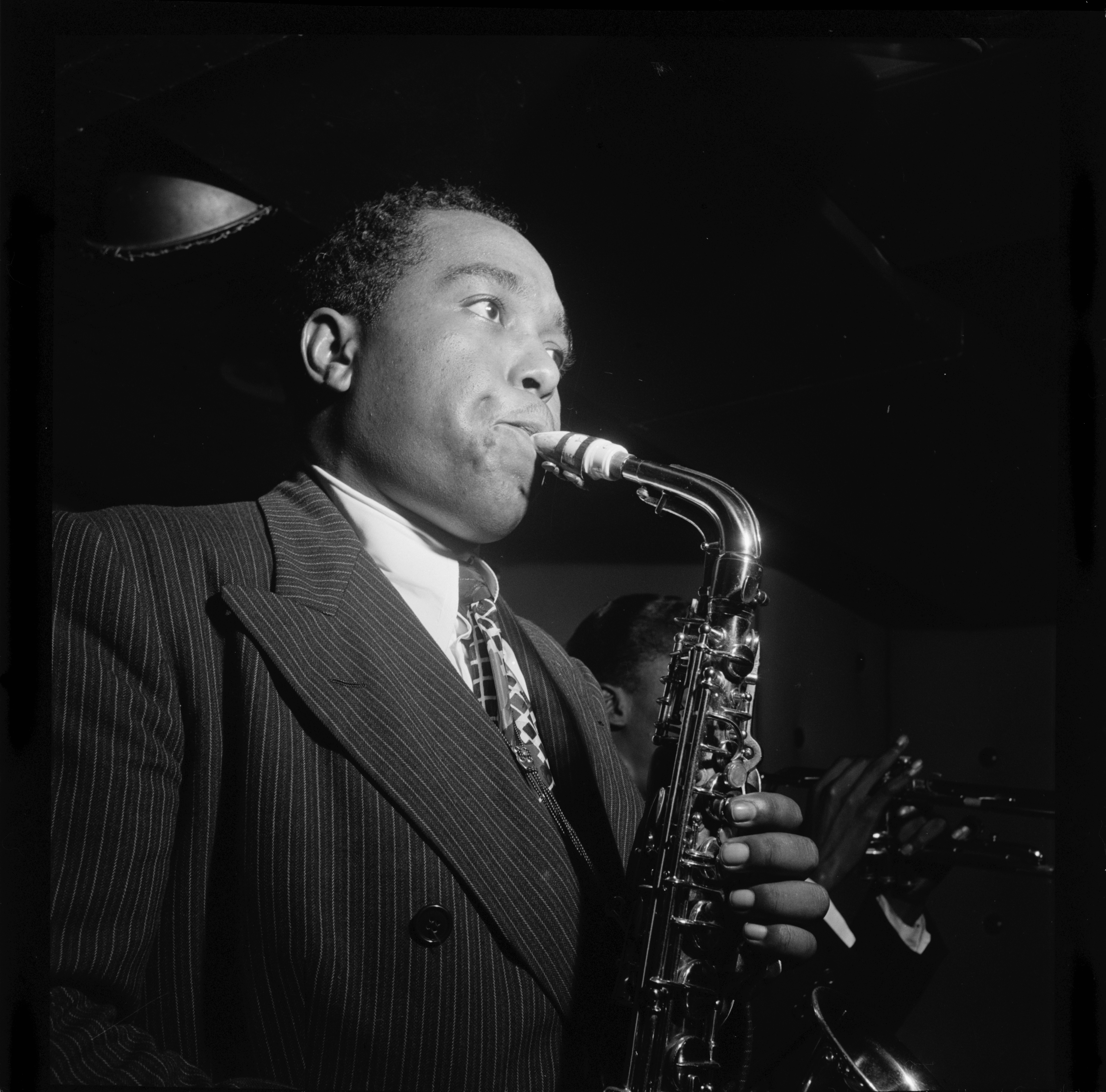
Charlie Parker, leader of the bebop revolution, 1947

The influence of Lester Young with the Count Basie Orchestra in the late 1930s and the popularity of Hawkins's 1939 recording of "Body and Soul" marked the saxophone as an influence on jazz equal to the trumpet, which had been the defining instrument of jazz since its beginnings in New Orleans. However, the greatest influence of the saxophone in jazz was to occur a few years later when alto saxophonist Charlie Parker became an icon of the bebop revolution that influenced generations of jazz musicians. The small-group format of bebop and post-bebop jazz ensembles gained ascendancy in the 1940s, as musicians used the harmonic and melodic freedom pioneered by Parker, Dizzy Gillespie, Thelonious Monk, and Bud Powell in extended jazz solos.

During the 1950s, prominent alto players included Sonny Stitt, Cannonball Adderley, Jackie McLean, Lou Donaldson, Sonny Criss, and Paul Desmond, while prominent tenor players included Lester Young, Coleman Hawkins, Dexter Gordon, John Coltrane, Sonny Rollins, Stan Getz, Zoot Sims, Lucky Thompson, Eddie "Lockjaw" Davis, and Paul Gonsalves. Serge Chaloff, Gerry Mulligan, Pepper Adams, and Leo Parker brought the baritone saxophone to prominence as a solo instrument. Steve Lacy renewed attention to the soprano saxophone in the context of modern jazz and John Coltrane boosted the instrument's popularity during the 1960s. Notable smooth jazz musician Kenny G also uses the soprano as his principal instrument.

Saxophonists such as John Coltrane, Ornette Coleman, Sam Rivers, and Pharoah Sanders defined the forefront of creative exploration with the avant-garde movement of the 1960s. The new realms offered with modal, harmolodic, and free jazz were explored with every device that saxophonists could conceive of. Sheets of sound, tonal exploration, upper harmonics, and multiphonics were hallmarks of the creative possibilities that saxophones offered. One lasting influence of the avant-garde movement is the exploration of non-Western ethnic sounds on the saxophone, for example, the African-influenced sounds used by Sanders and the Indian-influenced sounds used by Coltrane. The devices of the avant-garde movement have continued to be influential in music that challenges the boundaries between avant-garde and other categories of jazz, such as that of alto saxophonists Steve Coleman and Greg Osby.

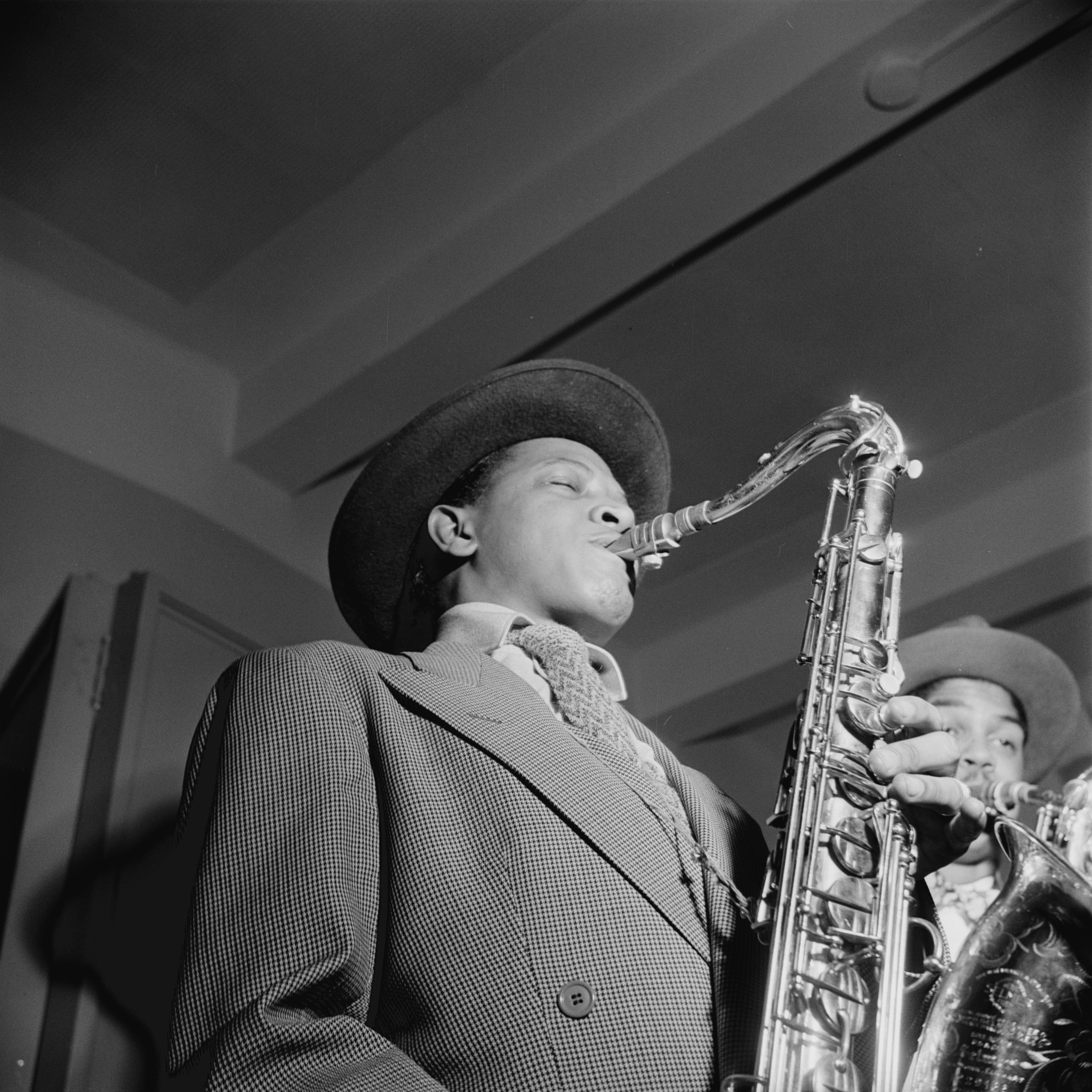
Illinois Jacquet, early influence on R&B saxophone, 1941

Some ensembles such as the World Saxophone Quartet use the soprano–alto–tenor–baritone (SATB) format of the classical saxophone quartet for jazz. In the 1990s, World Saxophone Quartet founder Hamiet Bluiett formed the quartet Baritone Nation (four baritones).

The "jump swing" bands of the 1940s gave rise to rhythm and blues, featuring horn sections and exuberant, strong-toned, heavily rhythmic styles of saxophone playing with a melodic sense based on blues tonalities. Illinois Jacquet, Sam Butera, Arnett Cobb, and Jimmy Forrest were major influences on R&B tenor styles and Louis Jordan, Eddie "Cleanhead" Vinson, Earl Bostic, and Bull Moose Jackson were major influences on alto. The R&B saxophone players influenced later genres including rock and roll, ska, soul, and funk. Horn section work continued with Johnny Otis and Ray Charles featuring horn sections, and the Memphis Horns, the Phenix Horns, and Tower of Power, achieving distinction for their section playing. Horn sections were added to the Chicago and West Coast blues bands of Lowell Fulson, T-Bone Walker, B. B. King, and Guitar Slim. Rock and soul fusion bands such as Chicago, The Electric Flag, and Blood, Sweat & Tears featured horn sections. Bobby Keys and Clarence Clemons became influential rock and roll saxophone stylists. Junior Walker, King Curtis, and Maceo Parker became influential soul and funk saxophone stylists, influencing the more technical jazz fusion sounds of Michael Brecker and Bob Mintzer and pop-jazz players such as Candy Dulfer.

== Unusual variants ==
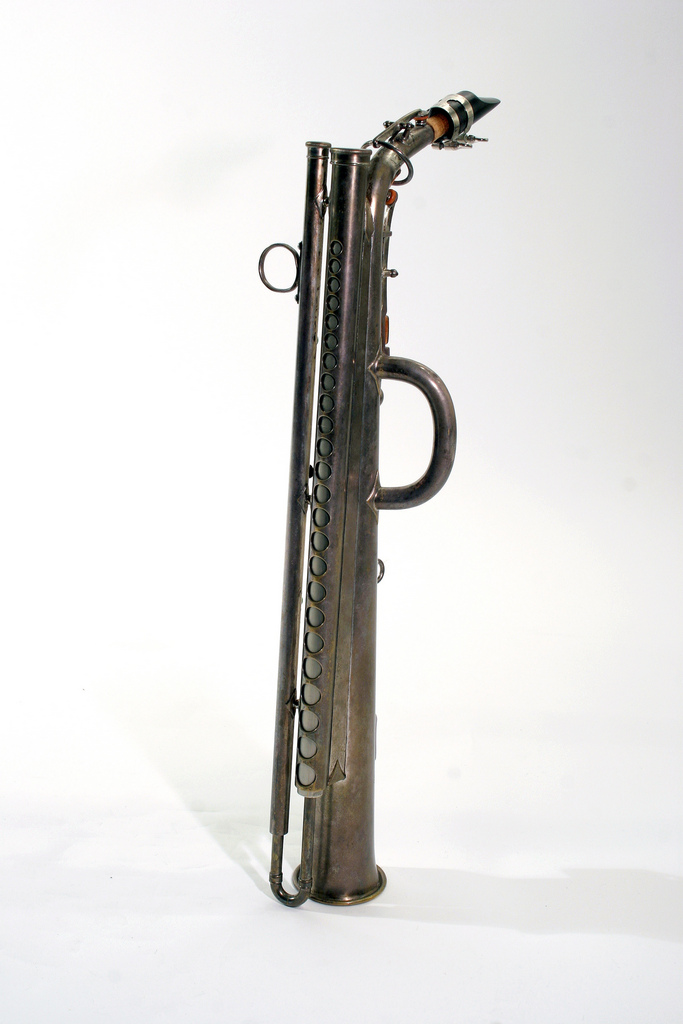
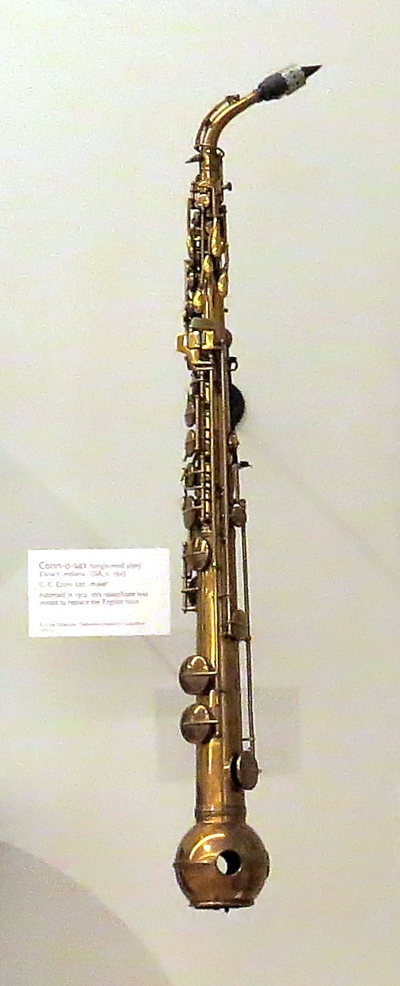
Left: slide saxophone, c. 1922 by Reiffel & Husted (Museum of Making Music, California). Right: Conn-O-Sax, c. 1930 by C. G. Conn (Musical Instrument Museum, Phoenix, AZ).

A number of experimental saxophones and saxophone-related instruments have appeared since Sax's original work, most with no lasting impact. During the early 1920s, Reiffel & Husted of Chicago produced a slide soprano saxophone. During the 1920s, some straight alto and tenor saxophones were produced by Buescher, which proved cumbersome to handle and more difficult to transport. Buescher custom-produced one straight baritone saxophone as novelty instrument for a vaudeville performer. C. G. Conn introduced two new variants in 1928–1929: the Conn-O-Sax and the mezzo-soprano saxophone, both keyed in F, one step above the E♭ alto. The Conn-O-Sax is built straight, with a slightly curved neck, a spherical Liebesfuß-style bell, and extra keys for low A and up to high G. It was produced only in 1929 and 1930 and intended to imitate the form and timbre of the cor anglais. With fewer than 100 surviving instruments, the Conn-O-Sax is highly sought after by collectors. The Conn mezzo-soprano experienced a similarly short production run, as the economics of the Great Depression curtailed the market for what were regarded as novelty instruments. Most were subsequently expended by Conn to train its repair technicians.

The most successful of the unusual 1920s designs was the King Saxello, essentially a straight B♭ soprano, but with a slightly curved neck and tipped bell, made by the H. N. White Company. Such instruments now command prices up to US$4,000. Its lasting influence is shown in the number of companies, including Keilwerth, Rampone & Cazzani (altello model), L.A. Sax, and Sax Dakota USA, marketing straight-bore, tipped-bell soprano saxophones as saxellos (or "saxello sopranos").

Rahsaan Roland Kirk playing simultaneously his "manzello" (left), "stritch" (center), and tenor saxophone; Helsinki Jazz Festival, 1964

Interest in two 1920s variants was revived by jazz musician Rahsaan Roland Kirk, who called his straight Buescher alto a "stritch" and his Saxello a "manzello". The Buescher straight alto was a production instrument while the manzello was in fact a Saxello with a custom-made large bell and modified keywork. More recently, the mezzo-soprano, or a modern variant of it, came into use by jazz musicians Anthony Braxton, James Carter, Vinny Golia, and Joe Lovano.

Some of the 1920s experimental designs, in addition to the Saxello, provide the basis for similar instruments produced during the modern era. Straight altos and tenors have been revived by Keilwerth, L.A. Sax, and Sax Dakota USA. A mezzo-soprano in the key of G has been produced by Danish woodwind technician Peter Jessen, most notably played by Joe Lovano. This instrument has more the timbral quality of Bb soprano saxophone.

The contralto saxophone, similar in size to the orchestral C melody, was developed in the late 20th century by California instrument maker Jim Schmidt. This instrument has a larger bore and a new fingering system, and does not resemble the orchestral instrument except for its key and register.

Benedikt Eppelsheim, of Munich, Germany, has introduced recent innovations at the upper and lower ends of the saxophone range. The soprillo saxophone is a piccolo-sized saxophone pitched an octave higher than the B♭ soprano saxophone. It is so small that the octave key is built into the mouthpiece. The tubax, developed in 1999 by Eppelsheim, plays the same range and with the same fingering as the E♭ contrabass saxophone. Its bore, however, is narrower than that of a contrabass, resulting in a more compact instrument with a "reedier" tone (akin to the double-reed contrabass sarrusophone). It can be played with the smaller (and more commonly available) baritone saxophone mouthpiece and reeds. Eppelsheim has also produced lower models of tubax in C and B♭, equivalent to the subcontrabass saxophone.

Among the 2000s developments is the aulochrome, a double soprano saxophone invented by Belgian instrument maker François Louis in 2001.

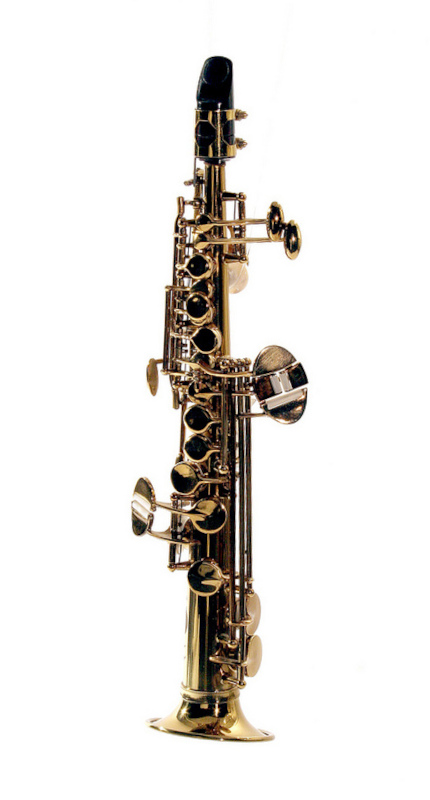
Eppelsheim soprillo saxophone, c. 2000s

Since the 1950s, saxophones with non-metallic bodies have occasionally been in production. Such instruments have failed to gain acceptance over a number of issues including durability, repairability, and deficiencies in key action and tone. The best known of these efforts is the 1950s Grafton acrylic alto saxophone used briefly by Charlie Parker and Ornette Coleman. It had a production run of over 10 years as a budget model saxophone. The polycarbonate Vibratosax is in current production as a low-cost alternative to metal saxophones. Wooden Sawat saxophones are made in Thailand on a small scale. Opinions vary on the significance of body materials to sound.

The fingering scheme of the saxophone, which has had only minor changes since the instrument's original invention, has presented inherent acoustic problems related to closed keys below the first open tone hole that affect response of, and slightly muffle, some notes. There is also a lack of tactile consistency between key centers, requiring extra effort from the player to adjust modes of muscle memory when moving between key centers. There have been two noteworthy efforts to remedy the acoustic problems and awkward aspects of the original fingering system:

The Leblanc Rationale and System saxophones have key mechanics designed to remedy the acoustic problems associated with closed keys below the first open tone hole. They also enable players to make half-step shifts of scales by depressing one key while keeping the rest of the fingering consistent with that of the fingering a half step away. Some Leblanc System features were built into the Vito Model 35 saxophones of the 1950s and 1960s. Despite the advantages of that system, acceptance was impaired by the expense and mechanical reliability issues related to the complexity of certain key mechanisms.

The chromatic, or linear fingering, saxophone is a project of instrument designer and builder Jim Schmidt, developing a horn maximizing tactile and logical consistency between every interval regardless of the key, and avoiding the acoustic problems associated with closed keys below the first open tone hole. Several working prototypes have been built and presented at trade shows. Production of this original and expensive saxophone is on an individual order basis.

== Related instruments ==
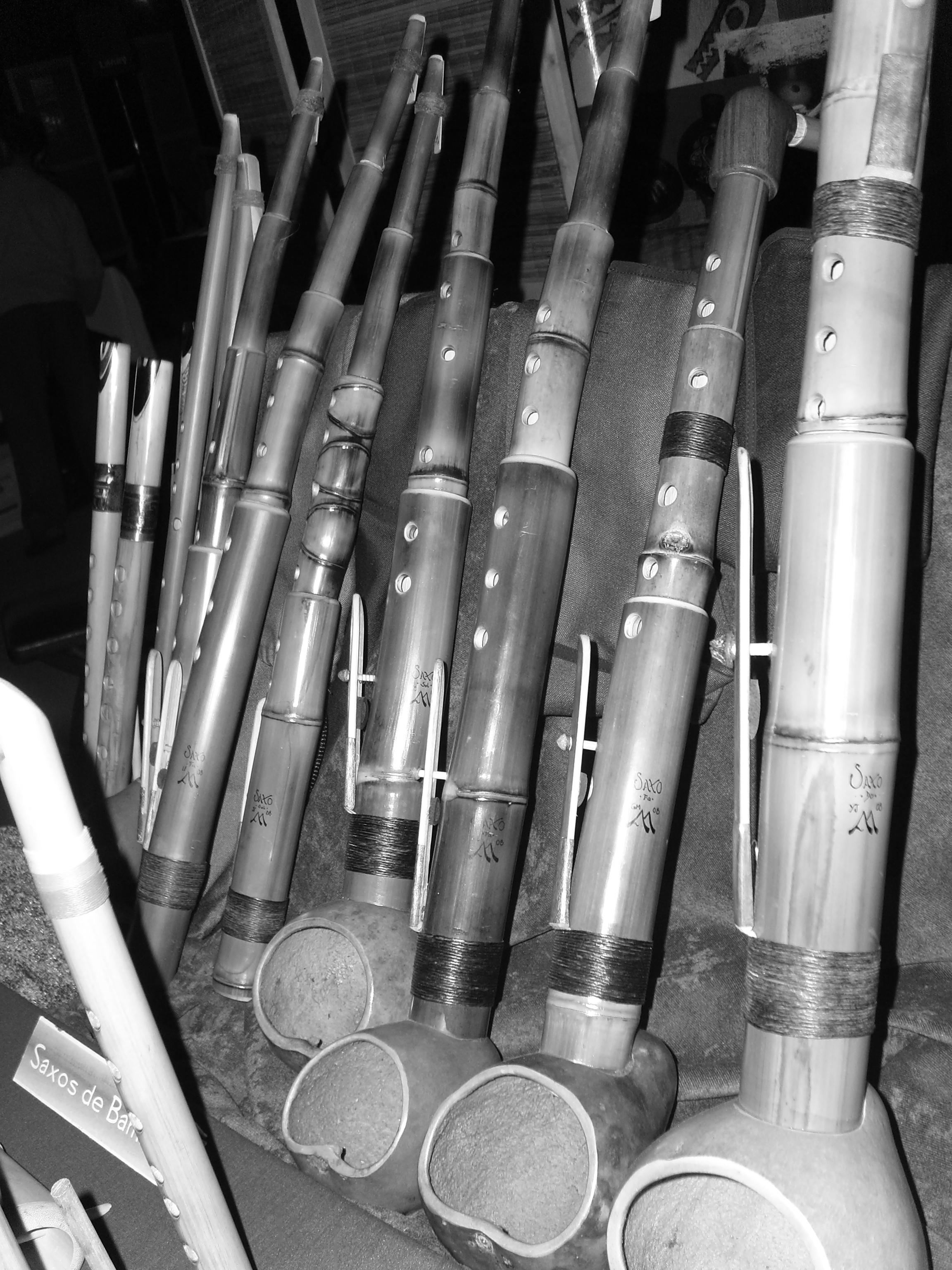
Saxos de Bambú ('bamboo saxophones') by Ángel Sampedro del Río, Argentina

Inexpensive keyless folk versions of the saxophone made of bamboo (recalling a chalumeau) were developed in the 20th century by instrument makers in Hawaii, Jamaica, Thailand, Indonesia, Ethiopia, and Argentina. The Hawaiian instrument, called a xaphoon, was invented during the 1970s and is also marketed as a "bamboo sax", although its cylindrical bore more closely resembles that of a clarinet and its lack of any keywork makes it more akin to a recorder. Jamaica's best known exponent of a similar type of homemade bamboo "saxophone" was the mento musician and instrument maker Sugar Belly (William Walker). In the Minahasa region of the Indonesian island of Sulawesi, there exist entire bands made up of bamboo "saxophones" and "brass" instruments of various sizes. These instruments are imitations of European instruments, made using local materials. Similar instruments are produced in Thailand.

In Argentina, Ángel Sampedro del Río and Mariana García have produced bamboo saxophones of various sizes since 1985. Many synthesizer wind controllers are played and fingered like a saxophone, such as the Electronic Wind Instrument (EWI). A double reed instrument known as the rothphone and a brass instrument known as the jazzophone are both shaped similarly to an alto or tenor saxophone.

== Image gallery ==
Click on images to enlarge.

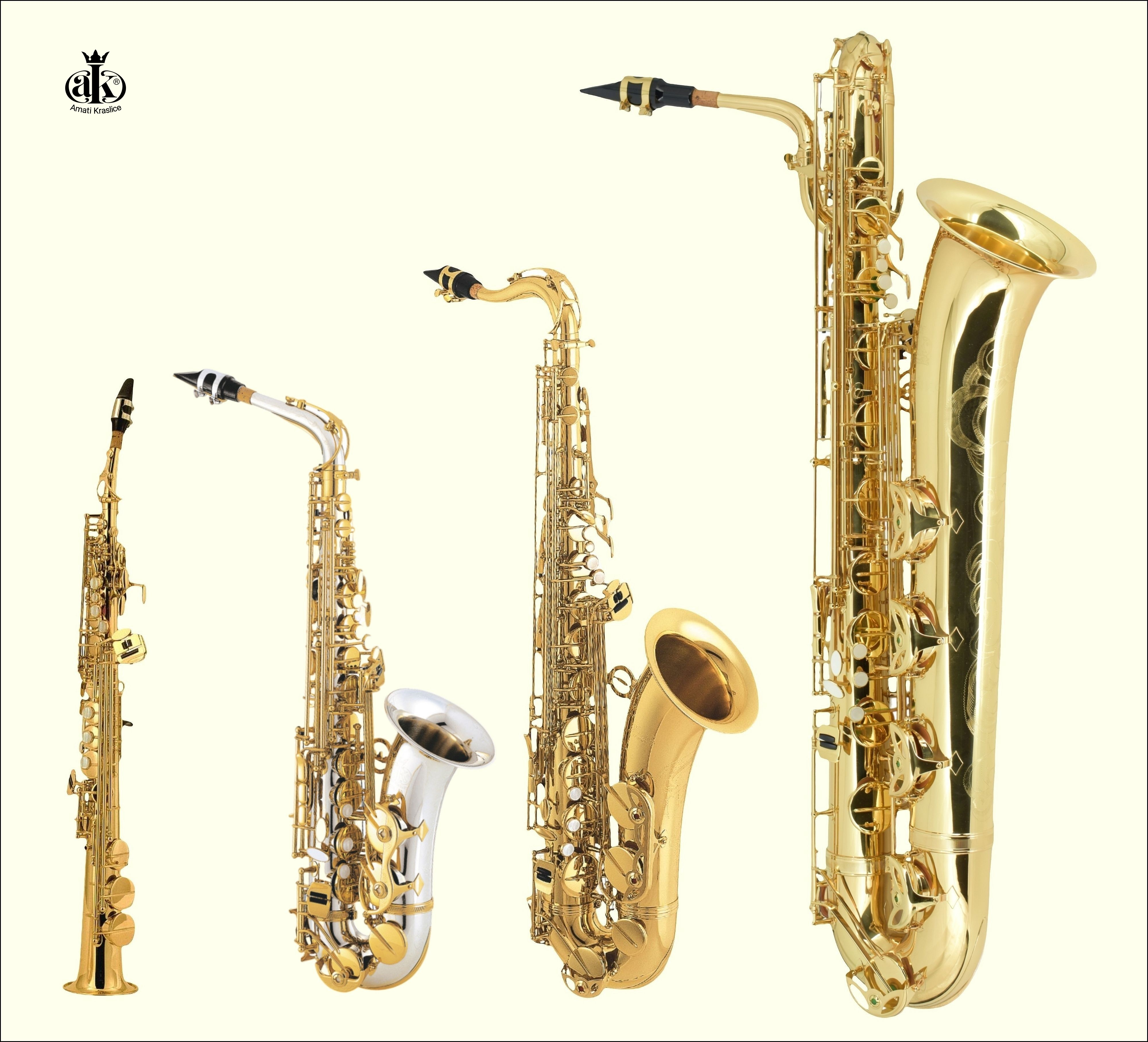
From left: a B♭ soprano saxophone, E♭ alto saxophone, a B♭ tenor saxophone, and an E♭ baritone saxophone

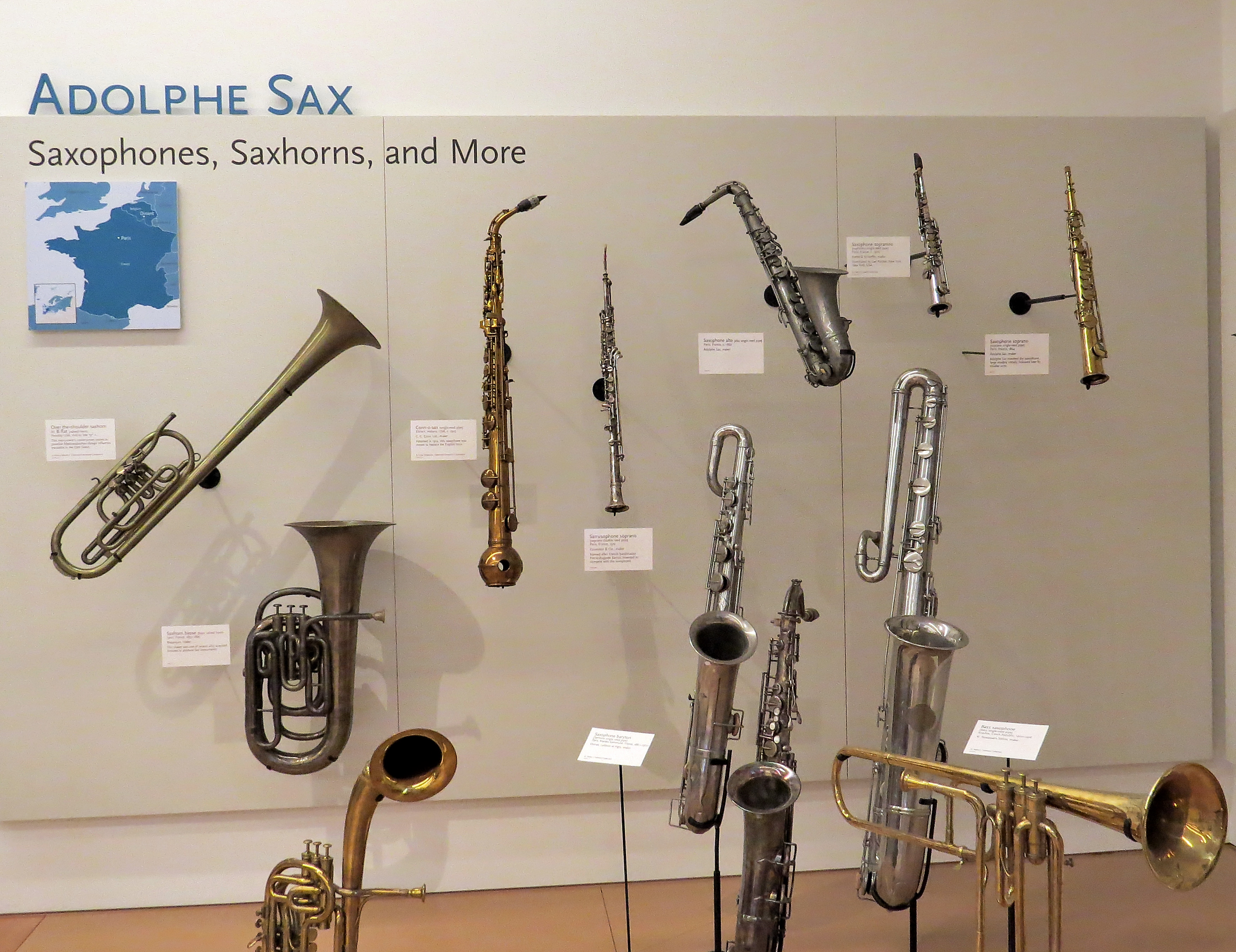
Various Adolphe Sax saxophones and instruments, Phoenix Musical Instrument Museum, 2013

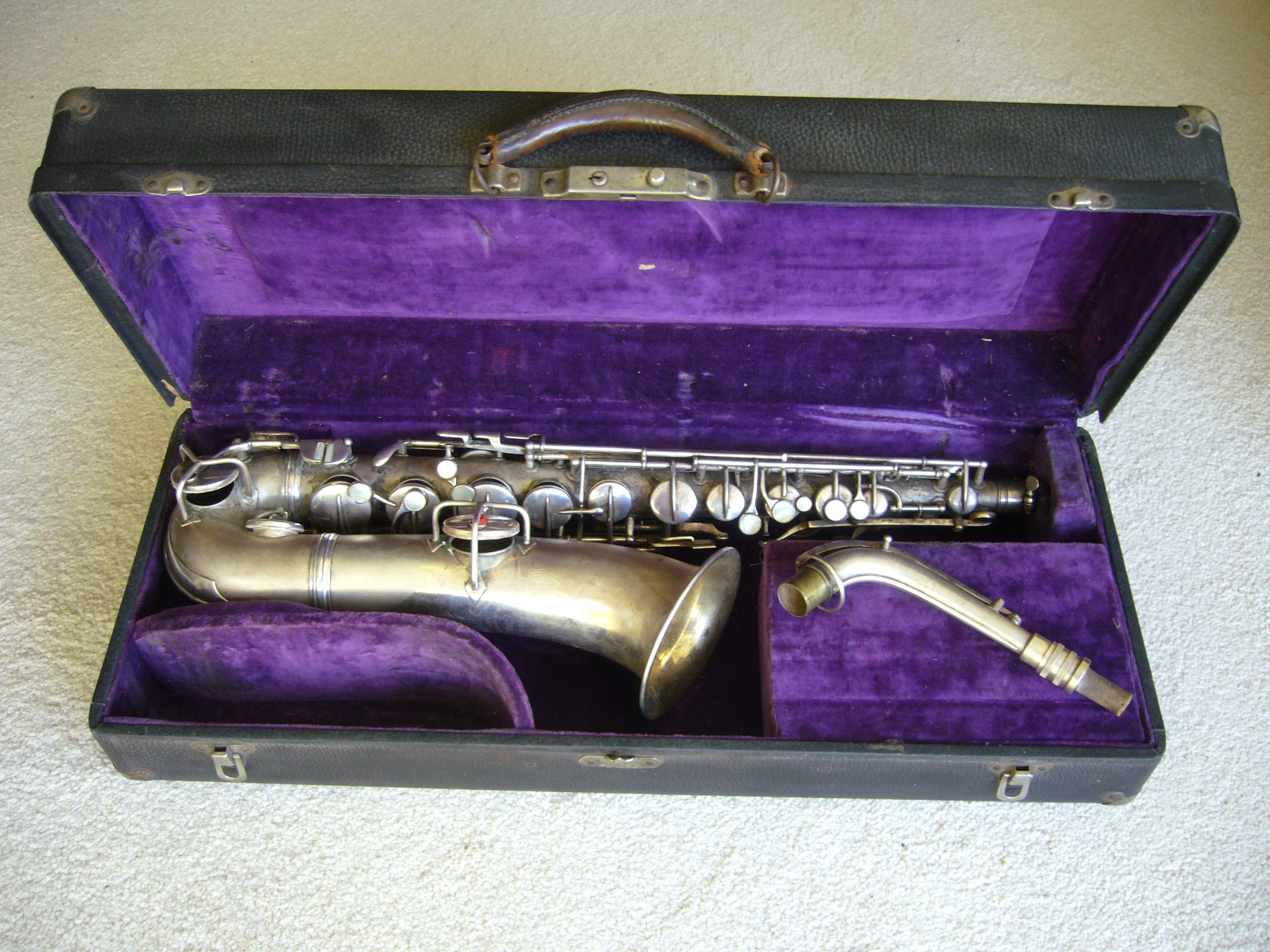
A straight-necked Conn C melody saxophone (New Wonder series 1) with a serial number that dates manufacture to 1922

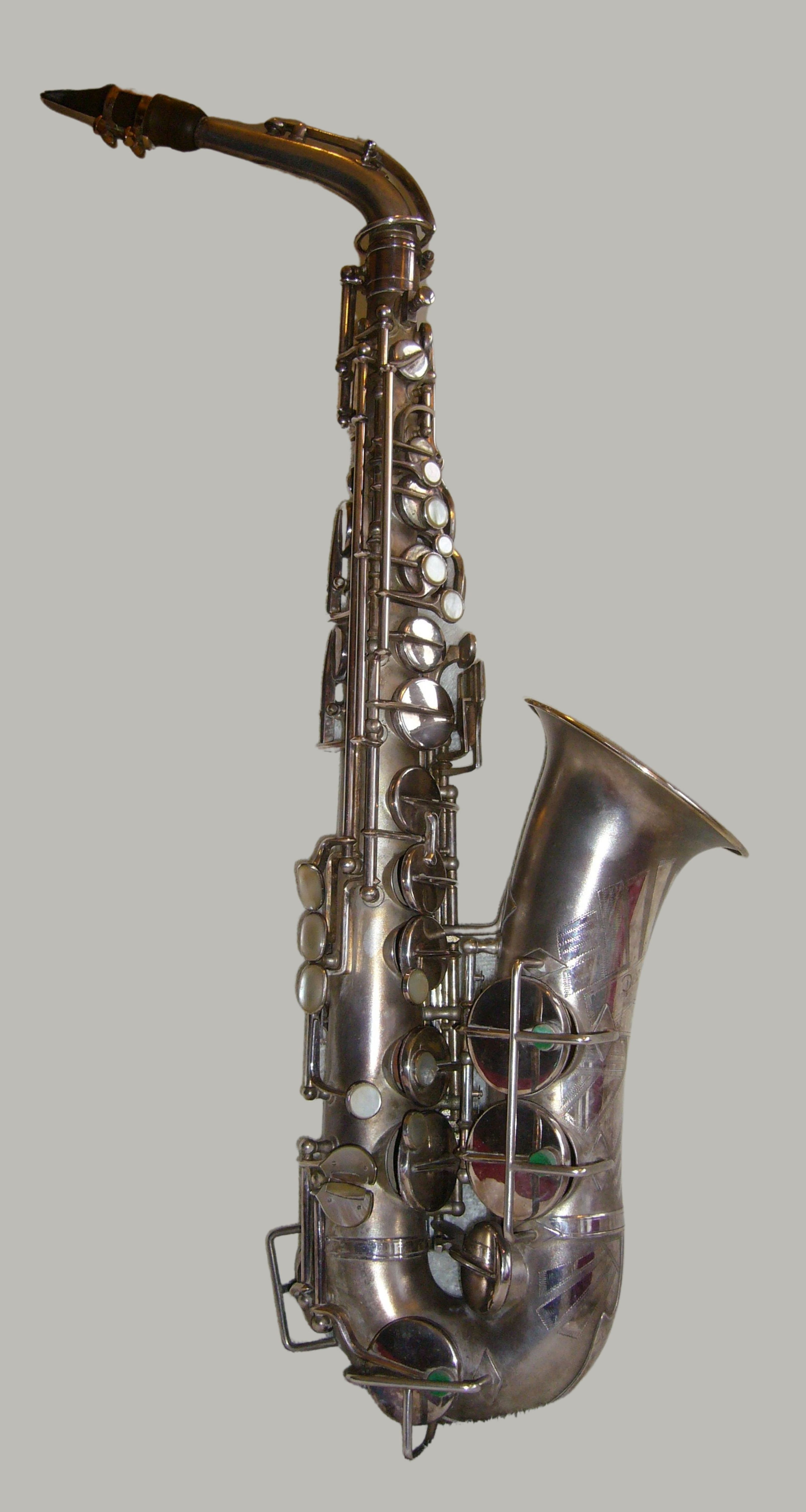
Silver-plated Pennsylvania Special alto saxophone, manufactured by Kohlert & Sons for Selmer in Czechoslovakia, c. 1930

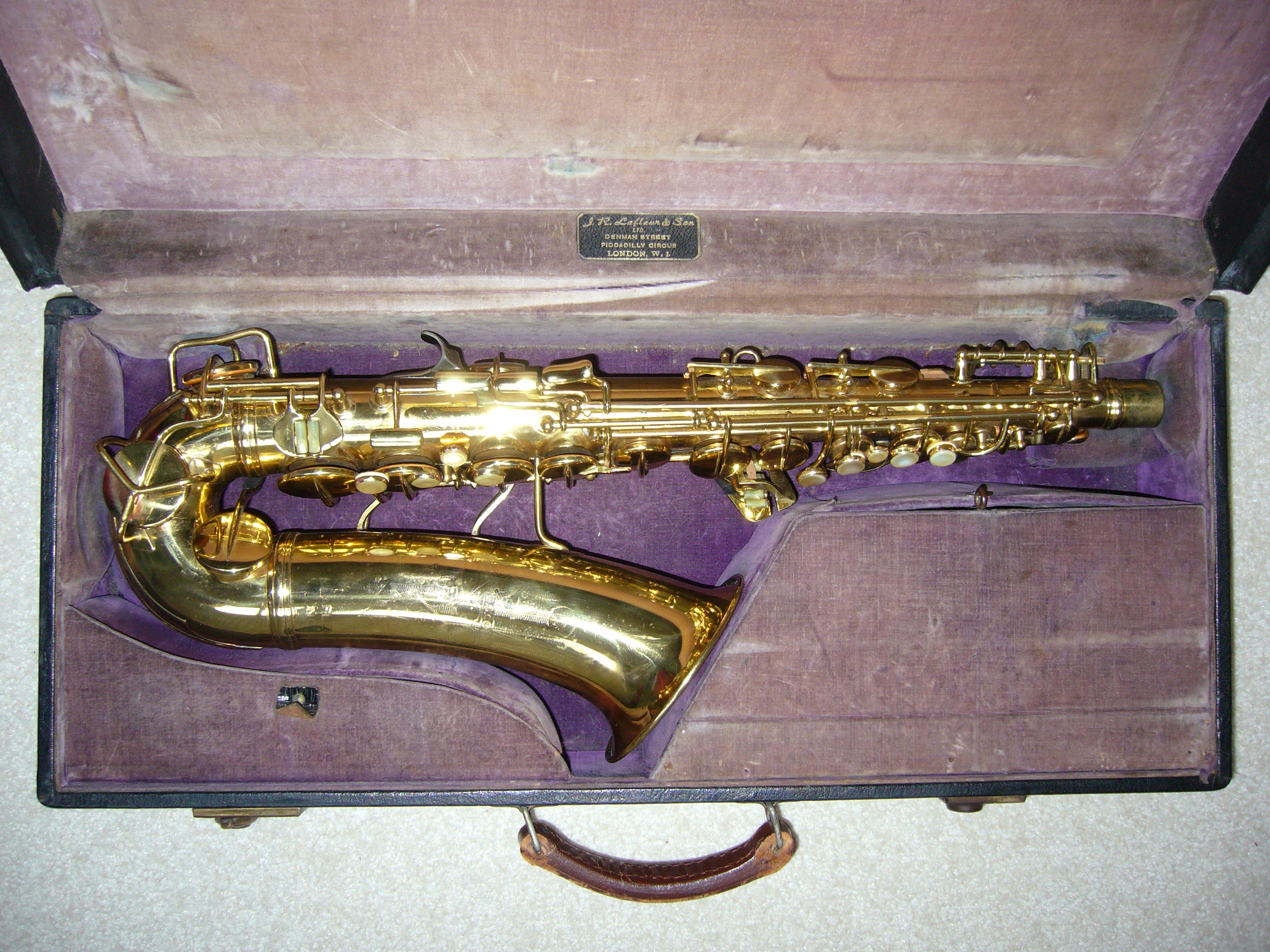
Conn 6M "Lady Face" brass alto saxophone (dated 1935) in its original case

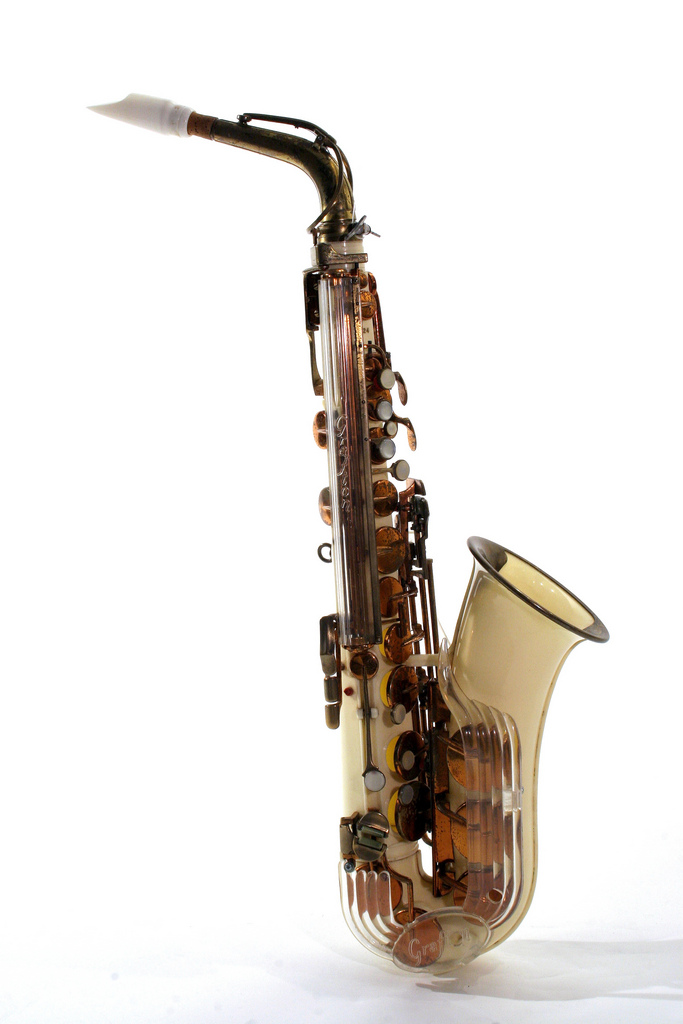
1950s Grafton alto saxophone made of plastic

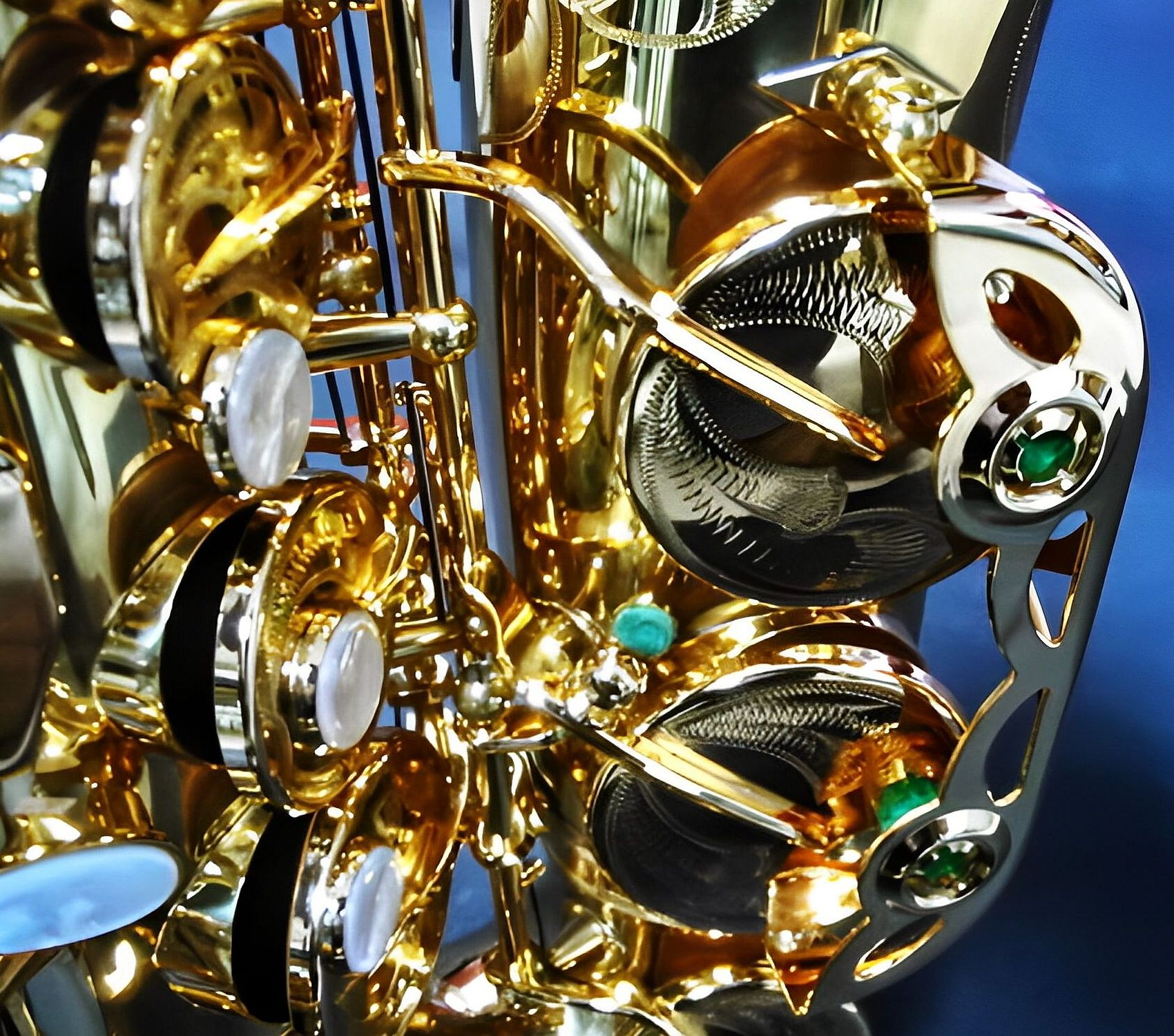
Detail on a P. Mauriat alto saxophone, showing the mother of pearl key touches and engraved brass pad cups

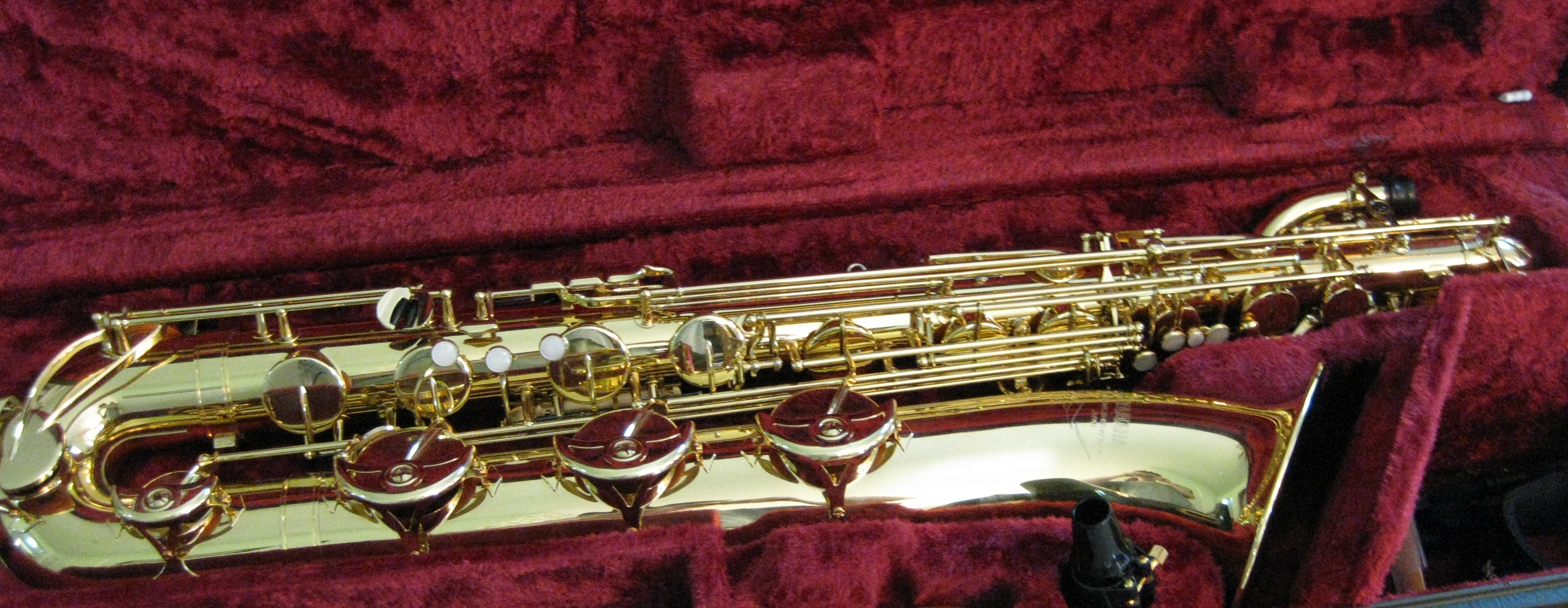
Yamaha baritone saxophone, c. 2000s

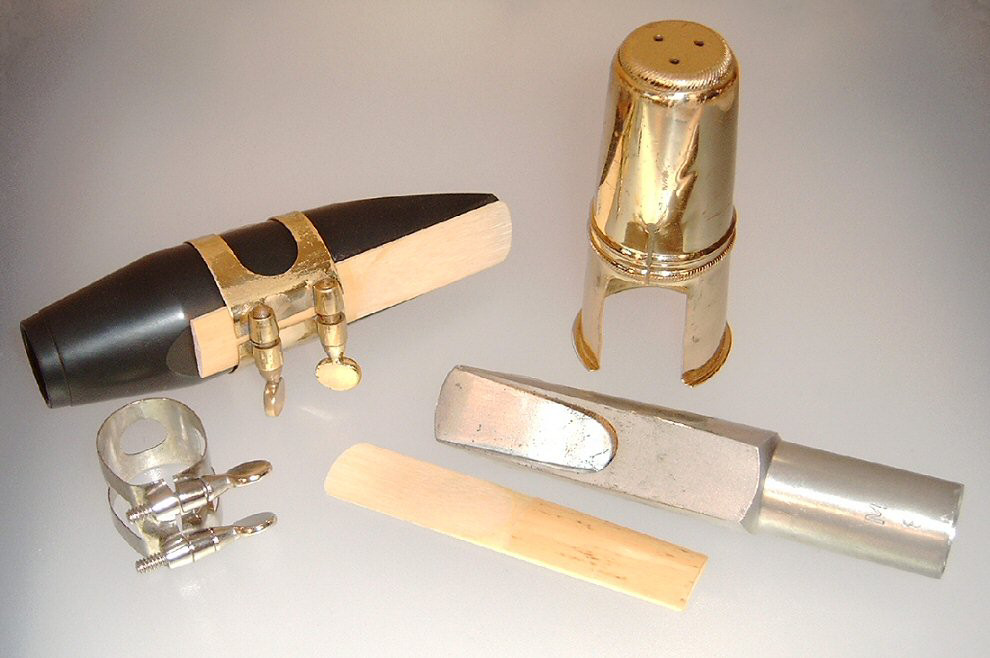
Two mouthpieces for tenor saxophone: the one on the left is ebonite; the one on the right is metal

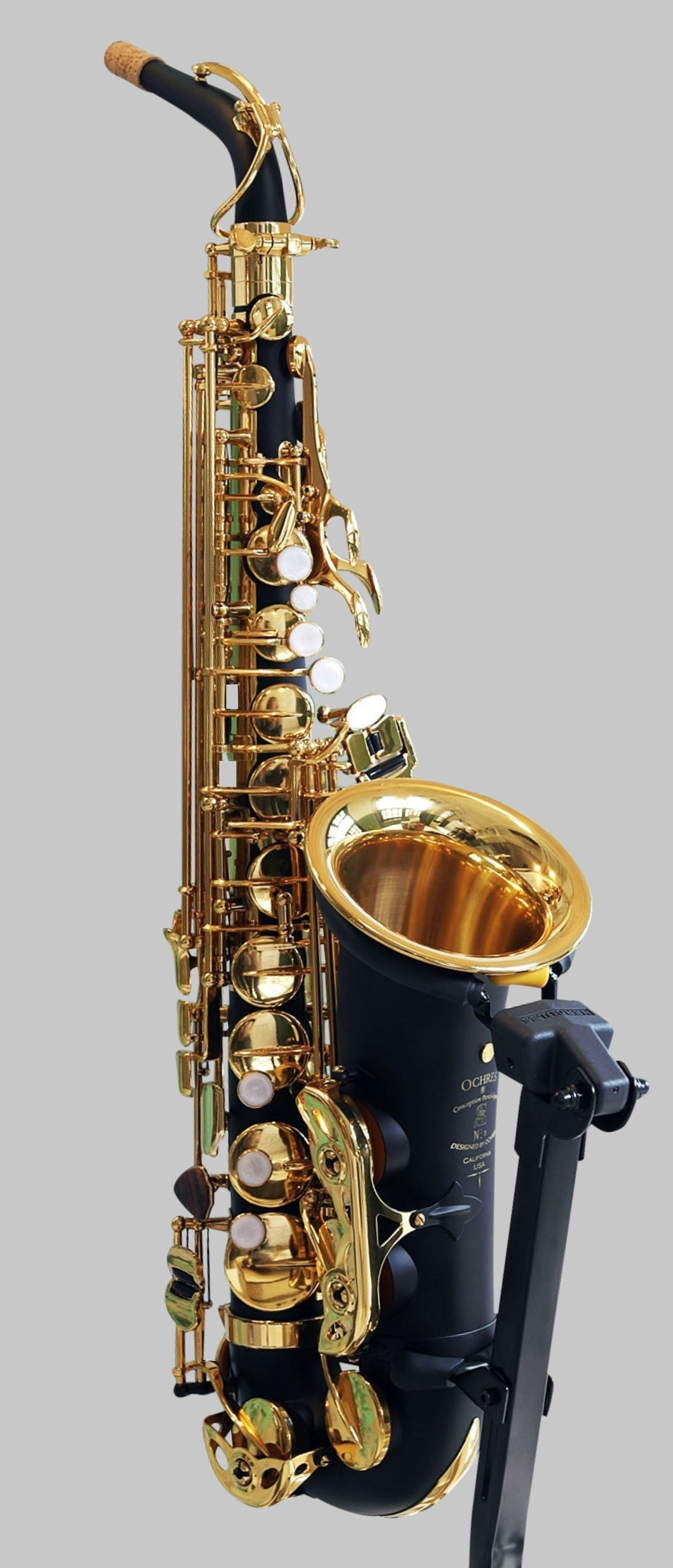
Ochres Music No.5 alto saxophone in black lacquer

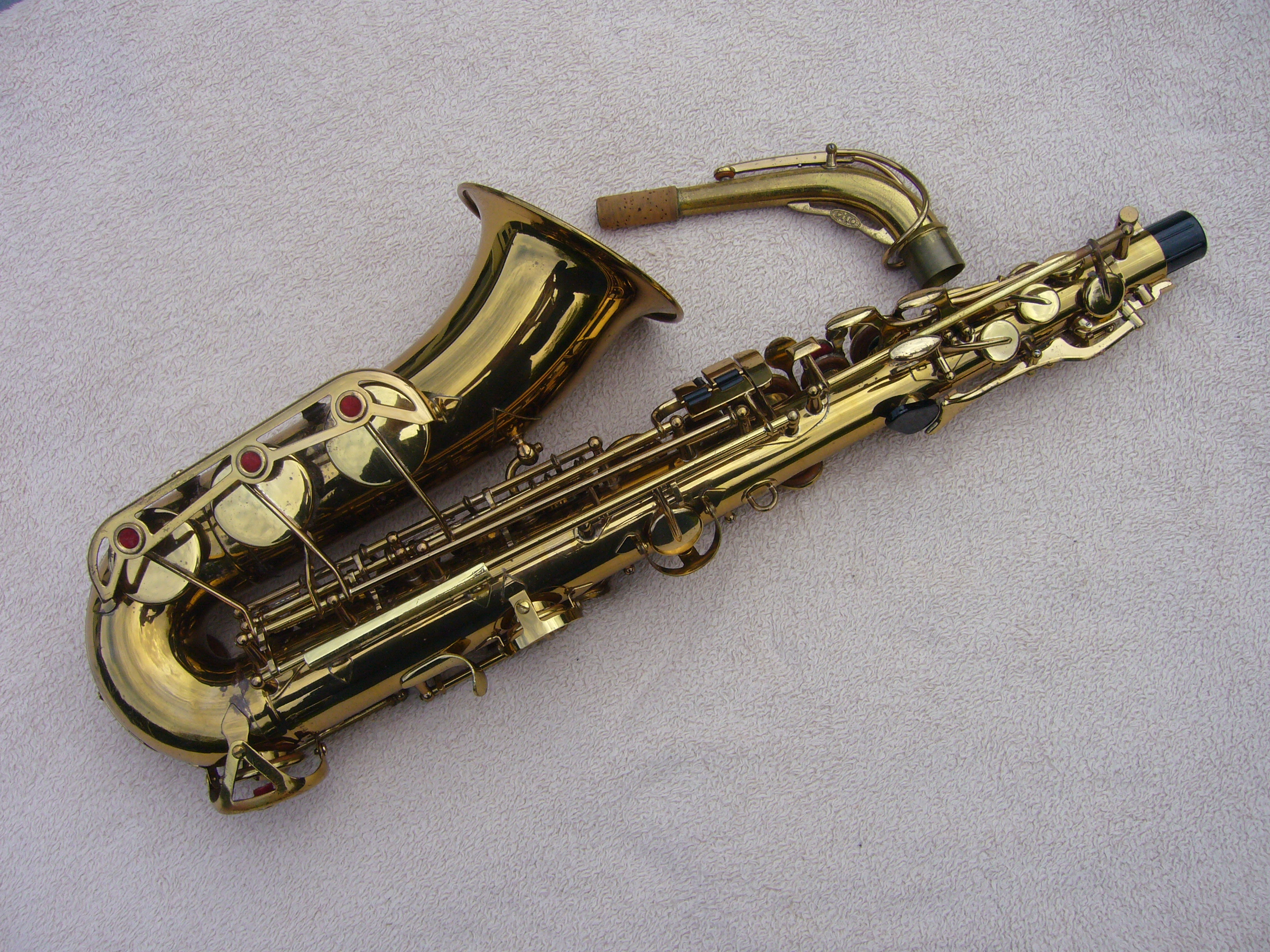
Vito Model 35 alto saxophone, c. 1960s. It is an unusual instrument with additional keywork.

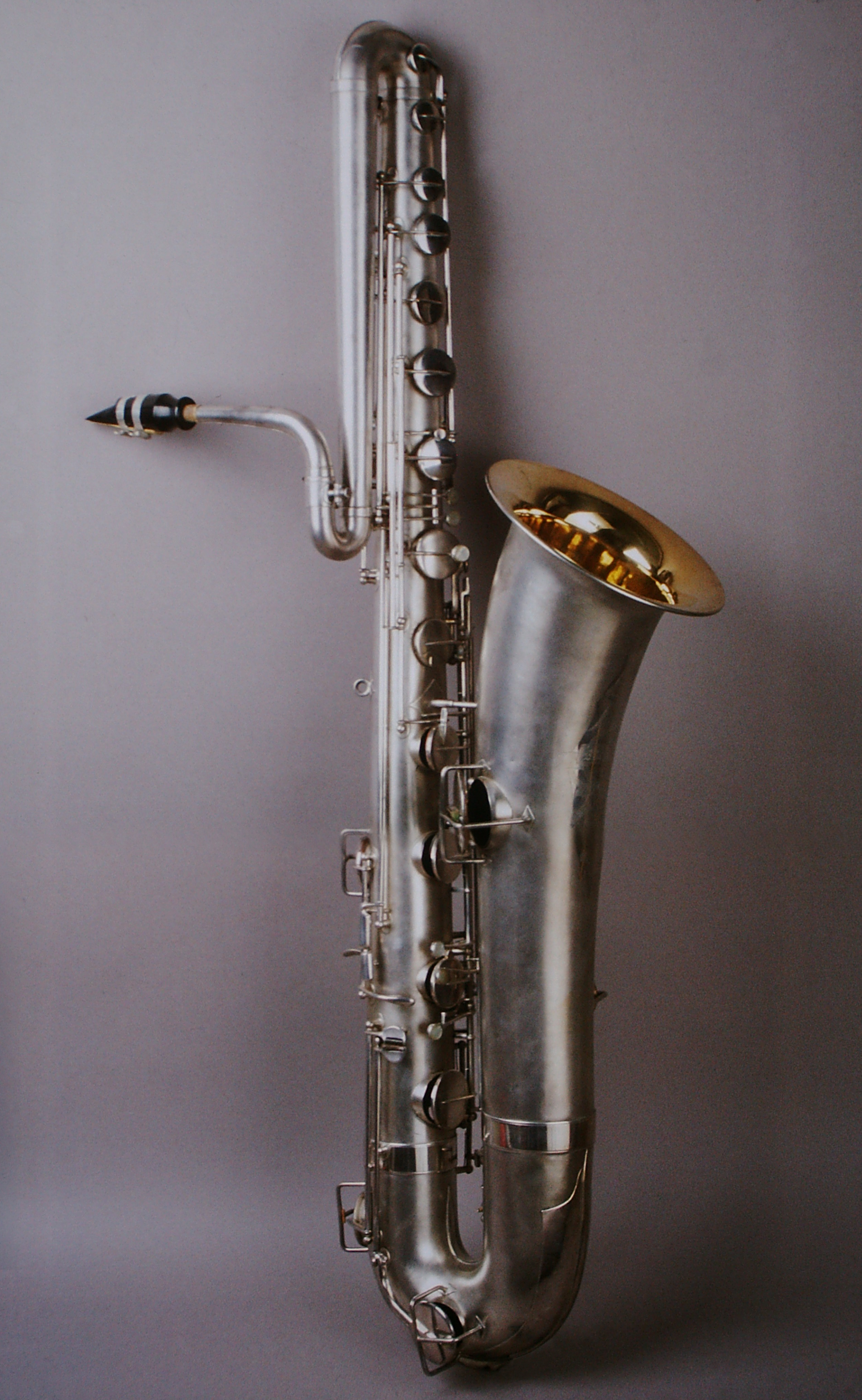
B♭ American-wrap bass saxophone, Elkhart Band Instrument Co., c. 1923–28

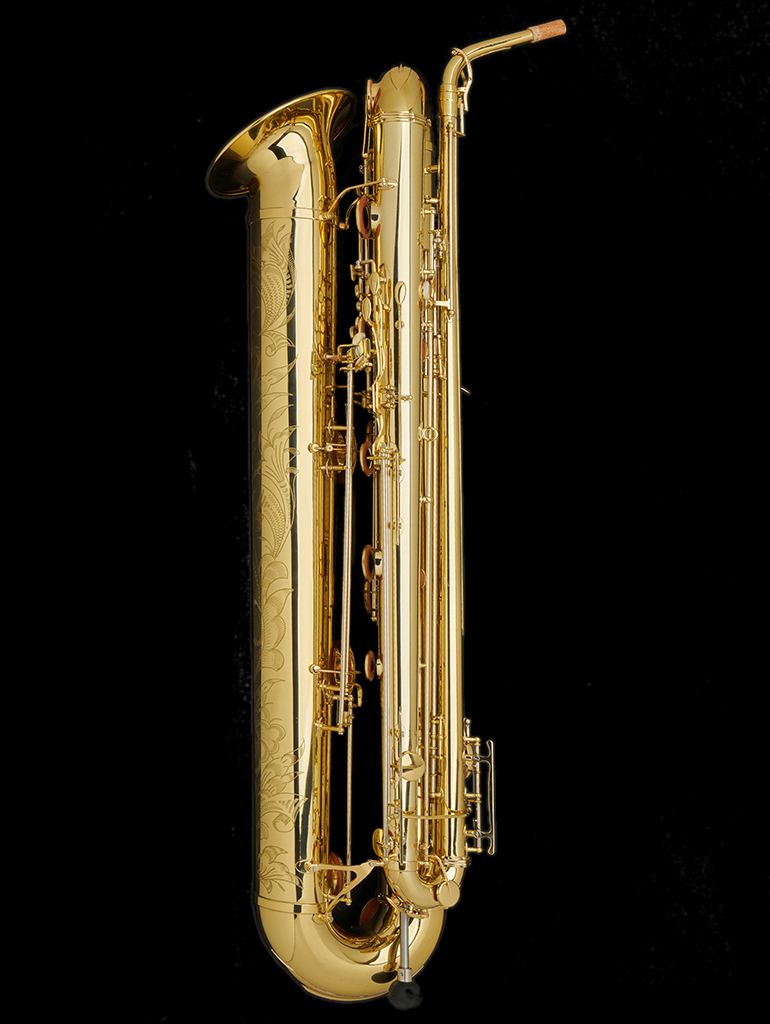
Eppelsheim tubax saxophone

== See also ==
- Saxophone technique
- List of saxophonists
