= Sawat saxophone =

Wooden saxophone company

Sawats are wooden saxophones created by designer Sawat (Sawad) Dejprakune in Chiang Rai, Thailand. They are available in tenor, alto, and soprano versions. They are the only true wooden saxophone (as opposed to clarinet) in production as of 2012. They are also called Sawad saxophone, depending on the romanization of the Thai name.

Dejpakune began as a music teacher frustrated with the high cost of traditional brass saxophones, which essentially put them out of the reach of ordinary Thai students. He decided to create a more affordable saxophone using local materials, eventually choosing wood. As of December 2008, he operated an instrument shop in Chiang Rai.

Despite its innovative design and unique tone, the instrument remains largely unknown outside of Thailand.
