= Sugar Belly =

Jamaican mento musician

- Born: William Walker
- Origin: Kingston, Jamaica
- Genres: Jamaican mento, reggae, calypso
- Occupation: Musician
- Instruments: Bamboo sax, vocals, bamboo fife
- Labels: Studio One, Port-O-Jam, Techniques, others

Sugar Belly (William Walker) was a Jamaican mento musician in the mid 20th century. Sugar Belly's music was distinctive for his use of a homemade bamboo saxophone, as well as the bamboo fife. His fine playing can be heard on many mento recordings of the 1950s and 1960s, as well as his 1970s Studio One instrumental, solo reggae album entitled Sugar Merengue. There were other bamboo sax players in Jamaica, including Wilbert Stephenson, who recorded extensively with Chin's Calypso Quartet in the 1950s.

== Discography ==
=== Albums ===
- Linstead Market (Port-O-Jam)
- Sugar Merengue (Studio One, 1974)
- The Return Of Sugar Belly (Techniques, 1985)

On top of his mento session work for artists including Count Lasher, around twenty Sugar Belly mento and reggae singles were issued in Jamaica on the Port-O-Jam, High Note, Techniques, Studio One, Calypso Joe, and Love Bond labels.
