= Balanced action =

Series of instruments by Henri Selmer, 1930s

Balanced action refers to new models of saxophones and trumpets introduced by Henri Selmer & Cie during the 1930s, and has different meanings depending on whether one is referring to the trumpet or saxophone model.

== Balanced action trumpets ==
1933 balanced Louis Armstrong model

Balanced action trumpets have the valve assembly set forward (170mm vs. 140mm), closer to the bell. This style of trumpet was first developed by the Henri Selmer Paris company in 1933 for Louis Armstrong, and was also famously used by Harry James, who preferred the configuration because of his long arms. Similar trumpets were also made by F. E. Olds (the Olds Recording Model) beginning in 1950 and King Musical Instruments, with the last instruments of this type being manufactured in the early 1970s.

== Balanced action saxophones ==
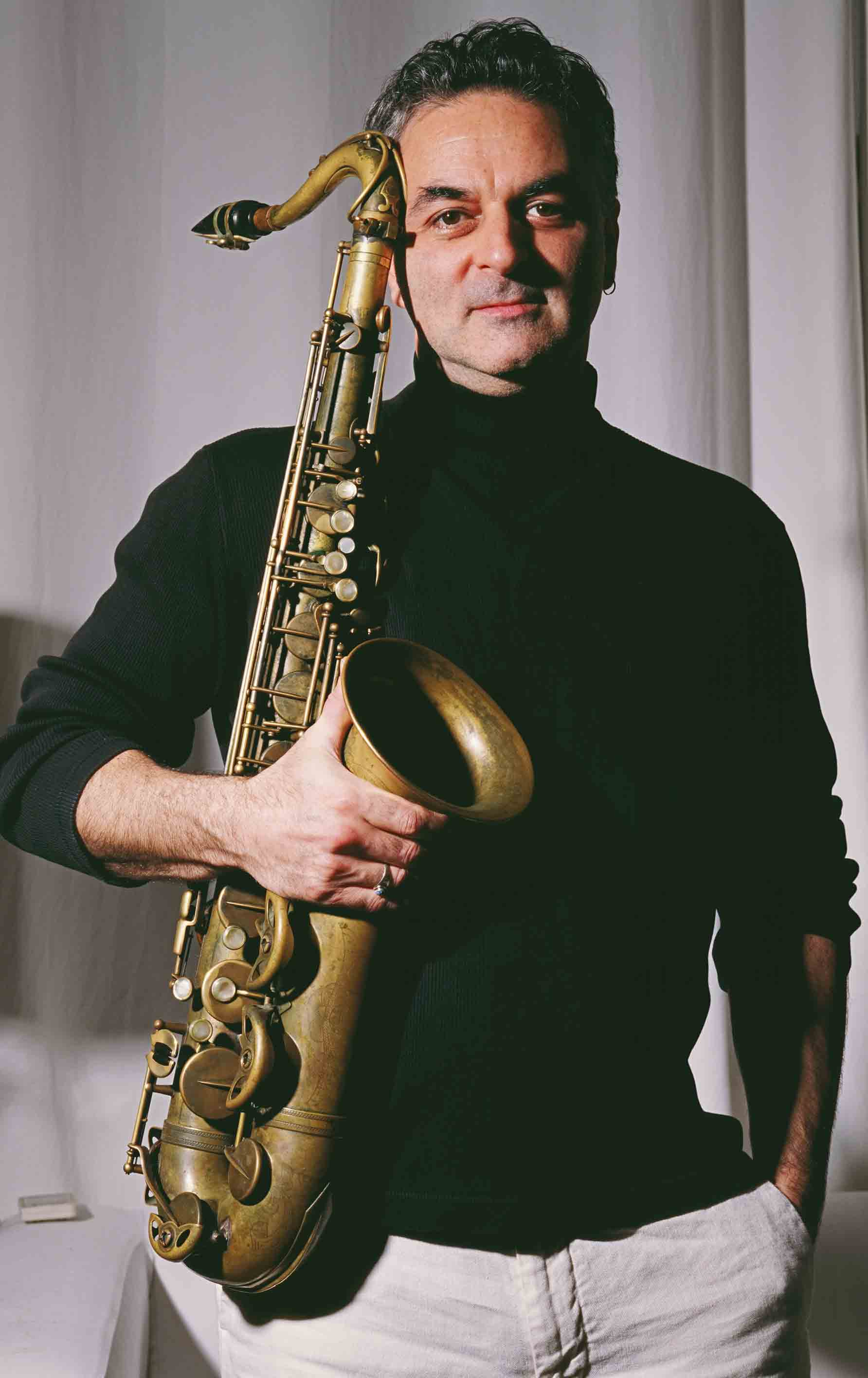
Avram Fefer with a 1945 Balanced Action tenor saxophone

The Selmer Balanced Action saxophone was manufactured by Selmer from 1935 through 1947. It introduced a revolutionary new layout for the key table operating the G♯ and low C♯, B, and B♭ keys. The layout solved long-standing deficiencies in those mechanisms and all modern saxophones have left hand key tables derived from this arrangement.

=== The problems to solve ===
The left hand key table had been an awkward feature of the saxophone from its earliest days. Drawbacks and compromises were inherent in the old layout with the long hinges running down the lower left side of the instrument. The bell keys were the heaviest keys with the heaviest action on the saxophone and the weakest of all the fingers were tasked with operating them. The pivots on the left side put the arcs of the key action in a direction that forced some degree of pushing left-to-right across the saxophone to operate the keys, in a weak direction of the finger away from the palm. Long arms to the lowermost key cups caused a tendency for them to bounce slightly upon closing. The long hinge tubes were also in a position vulnerable to damage from impacts on the left side of the instrument, especially the C♯ hinge that extended to a high post on or near the bow.

Minimizing the amount of left-to-right push was an objective that favored short lever action in the cluster, at the cost of leverage to gain positive action in operating the keys. The problem could also be mitigated by angling the key touches downward towards the body off the radius of the arc, but that was only a partial solution. With the adoption of articulated G♯ key action operated by the bell key mechanisms, more leverage from the table keys became necessary. Enlarged key tables considerably increased the leverage of the B and B♭ keys although the left-to-right push was more severe owing to the larger arc radius of the larger keys. Some increase in leverage was possible with the C♯ key, although its position in the table limited its design options.

=== Conn's pretty good solutions ===
With the C.G. Conn 6M and 10M saxophones, the low C♯, B, and B♭ key touches were mounted angled strongly off the radius of the action. The G♯ key touch was mounted on a horizontal pivot and on the same plane as the bell key touches.

That layout mitigated the cross-push issue considerably and compared favorably to those of competitors King, Buescher, Martin, and, at its introduction, Selmer. With the 26M and 30M "Connqueror" saxophones, Conn mounted all of the left cluster touches on horizontal pivots and moved the cluster closer to the left hand stack keys. That was a good ergonomic solution with action in the strong direction of the finger, but the mechanism was complex, costly to produce, and required extra adjustment. The C♯ pivot was also shortened and connected to the cup with an angled arm on the Connqueror models, mitigating some of its vulnerability. After these instruments were introduced, Conn's development efforts stagnated and the Connqueror models were discontinued in 1943.

=== Selmer's better solution ===
The right hand bell key layout introduced by Conn (for baritones) and King in the early 1930s provided the basis for Selmer's ultimate solution, shifting the bell 14 degrees to the left and mounting the table keys on pivots located over the right hand stack keys. With the arc of the action reversed, the table keys were pushed downwards towards the body tube in the strong direction of the finger. The lever arm of the C♯ key touch was lengthened, with considerable benefit. The bell key arms were shortened in that arrangement, adding mechanical advantage for positive key action and mitigating the tendency to bounce that had plagued the old style bell keys mounted on longer arms. The more compact mechanism reduced the mass of the bell keys, lightening the action. The reversed pivot direction also provided an opportunity to design a linkage for the C♯ key touch to gain mechanical advantage in overcoming the spring holding the cup in its closed position, allowing greater spring strength for a more robust seal of the pad. With those changes in action, the bell keys finally became balanced with the action of the rest of the horn, hence the name. The new layout also resulted in better protected mechanisms and more robust bell braces. The long, vulnerable hinges on the lower left side of the horn were replaced with shorter hinges in a less vulnerable position. The bell brace could be moved to the left side, with more options available for designing it for optimal protection and that is what Selmer did.

=== Subsequent developments ===
The Balanced Action was initially offered with two options for bell design, a short bell and a long bell. The short bell was freer blowing but resulted in intonation problems in the lower register. A high F♯ key was offered as another option. That option was not widely adopted because of its reputation for causing poor intonation with the Balanced Action and its Super Action and Mark VI descendants, although it later became a feature on most professional class saxophones.

The Balanced Action gained prestige through its use by the jazz saxophonist Coleman Hawkins, who made a splash with his return from France to the US and recording of Body and Soul in 1939.

With Selmer's next model, the Super Action introduced in 1948 with offset right and left hand key stacks, the basic layout of the modern saxophone was established. The Super Action also featured a removable bell and adjustment screws for keywork, which have become standard on modern saxophones. Further ergonomic improvements were offered with the Mark VI introduced in 1953, which became the most widely used professional class saxophone produced in the mid twentieth century.

King was the first manufacturer other than Selmer to adopt table key mechanisms derived from those of the Balanced Action, in 1949. By the late 1960s, the new style mechanisms were on virtually every new model saxophone being introduced. The legacy mechanisms were continued on some student models into the 1980s. Improvements to the original mechanism added by Selmer and others include enlarged and contoured key touches, tilting key touches and rollers, and reinforcing braces for the top pillar supporting the mechanism.
