= Altissimo =

Uppermost register on woodwind instruments

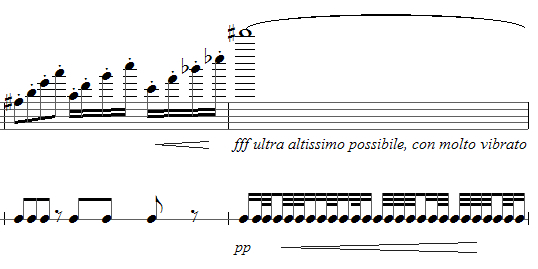
Fragment flushing altissimo

Altissimo (Italian for very high) is the uppermost register on woodwind instruments. For clarinets, which overblow on odd harmonics, the altissimo notes are those based on the fifth, seventh, and higher harmonics. For other woodwinds, the altissimo notes are those based on the third, fourth, and higher harmonics.

== Flute, oboe, clarinet, and bassoon ==
On the Boehm system flute, the first altissimo note, D_{6}, is played using the third harmonic of G_{4}. Fourth harmonics are used for D♯_{6} through G♯_{6}, and notes from A_{6} through C_{7} are played with fifth or sixth harmonics.

The flute fingering for the notes D♯_{6} through G♯_{6} are a combination of third and fourth harmonic fingerings. For example, the D♯ fingering is similar to the low D♯_{4} with the addition of the G♯ key vented, for which D♯_{6} is the third harmonic. Similarly, in the third octave, the E is a combination of E and A fingerings, the F is a combination of F and B♭, etc.

On the oboe, third harmonics are mainly used.

On clarinets, fifth harmonics are used for the first six notes above the written C_{6}; seventh and ninth harmonics are used beyond that.

For bassoons, the altissimo notes bear complicated harmonic relationships to the fundamental register.

== Saxophone ==
Saxophone altissimo generally consists of the notes above the keyed range. Some instruments are keyed to a written high F, and some to F♯.

Altissimo is usually produced by using a combination of special fingerings and voicing techniques. These can include air stream, tongue, throat and embouchure variations to disturb the fundamental of a note, which results in one of the higher overtones dominating.

In classical music, altissimo playing is considered a necessary skill for saxophonists, and much of the modern concert saxophone repertoire utilizes the altissimo range. A notable proponent of the altissimo range was Sigurd Raschèr, who preferred the term top tones. Raschèr is the author of Top Tones For the Saxophone, a method book for learning the altissimo register.

In jazz music, use of altissimo is common, especially among avant-garde players, though one of its earliest practitioners was the swing player Earl Bostic. Altissimo technique and the use of multiphonics are prominent in the influential work of Eric Dolphy and John Coltrane during the 1960s, as well as in the work of Paul Desmond, Lenny Pickett, Ron Holloway, Scott Page, Michael Brecker and Chris Potter.
