= Edward A. Lefebre =

19th Century saxophonist

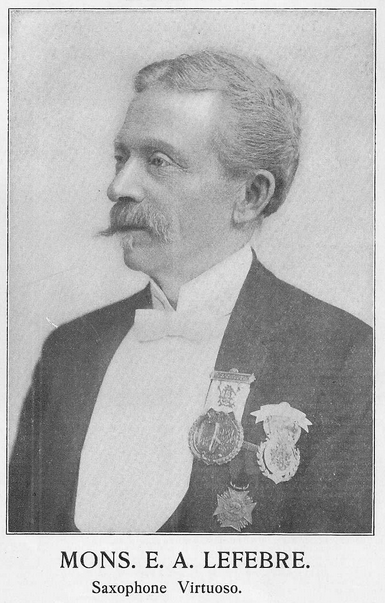

Edward Abraham Lefebre (15 December 1834 – 22 February 1911) was a virtuosic saxophonist in the late nineteenth century, best known for his work with Patrick Gilmore, John Philip Sousa, C. G. Conn, and the New York Saxophone Quartette Club. His frequent international performances and continued advocacy of the saxophone led to his nickname of "Saxophone King”.

== Biography ==
Edward Lefebre was born in Leeuwarden, the Netherlands to a family of French musicians. While little is known of his early musical career, he primarily performed on the clarinet until meeting Adolphe Sax in Paris in the 1850s.

Following his move to Cape Town, South Africa, in 1859 to run a music store (supplied by his father's company), Lefebre began freelance work as a concert saxophonist. These concerts regularly included audiences of South African dignitaries, and featured original repertoire for the saxophone (published by Adolphe Sax). He was then hired as a saxophonist in the Royal Alhambra Palace's orchestra in London in 1869. Following a promenade concert at the Royal Opera House with this orchestra, Lefebre was eagerly approached by Charles Gounod who simply said “Bravo – saxophone!” This wasn't his only impression on famous composers – later at a concert in Leipzig, praise from Richard Wagner led to more performances in Germany, though he never wrote for the saxophone.

By around 1872, Lefebre had moved to the United States, where he performed clarinet and saxophone as a freelance artist. He later abandoned the clarinet entirely when he joined the Twenty-second Regiment National Guard Band, under direction of Patrick Gilmore, in 1873. This group was one of the first American military bands to include a full saxophone section based on the instrumentation of the Garde Républicaine. The busy performance schedule and willingness of Gilmore to program solo works permitted Lefebre ample opportunity to expose audiences to the saxophone, which was still relatively unknown. The full section of Gilmore's band provided great opportunity for chamber music, and Lefebre soon formed the New York Quartette Club. Gilmore would also program this quartet on band concerts, and they insisted on performing original repertoire to gain respect for the instrument. Due to the limited repertoire, Lefebre had to commission and compose new works for the saxophone. New York composer Caryl Florio was searching for performers for new works, and wrote a series of pieces for Lefebre including Introduction, Theme and Variation (1879), for saxophone and orchestra, and Allegro de Concert (1885), for saxophone quartet.

The New York Quartette Club disbanded following the death of the soprano saxophonist Franz Wallrabe in 1885; however, Lefebre continued performing chamber music and formed the Lyceum Concert Club. This group had unorthodox instrumentation – a saxophone soloist, flute soloist, flugelhorn, contrabassoon, and saxophone quartet. Although the personnel and instrumentation changed very frequently and little is known about the group's repertoire, the group's mission was educational, and always gave lecture recitals.

Lefebre became the first saxophonist to make a phonograph recording as a soloist, recording for Edison, or one of its subsidiaries, sometime in early 1889. The nine selections he recorded for the United States Phonograph Company (a subsidiary of Edison's North American Phonograph Company) in 1894 "can be deemed with certainty to be the first by a saxophone soloist to be commercially released." "The repertoire chosen for these recordings represents the breadth of popular nineteenth-century genres recorded by other contemporary wind soloists in the early 1890s. They include two popular songs, a German popular song, three operatic selections, a Strauss lullaby, an Irish song, and a plantation song."

Upon Gilmore's death in 1892, John Philip Sousa had become the most prominent bandleader in the United States, and Lefebre had joined his band by 1893. At this time he was becoming better known as a pedagogue and was sponsored by C.G. Conn. His experience in manufacturing saxophones in France allowed him to create the Conn “Wonder” saxophone, in which he served as the spokesperson in advertisements. In 1896, Conn had created the Conn Conservatory in Elkhart, Indiana, where Lefebre became an instructor. Due to his heightened fame, Lefebre was able to perform freelance for the remainder of his life as a soloist and with the Lefebre Saxophone Quartette.
