= Saxophone concerto =

Concerto for solo saxophone and instrumental ensemble

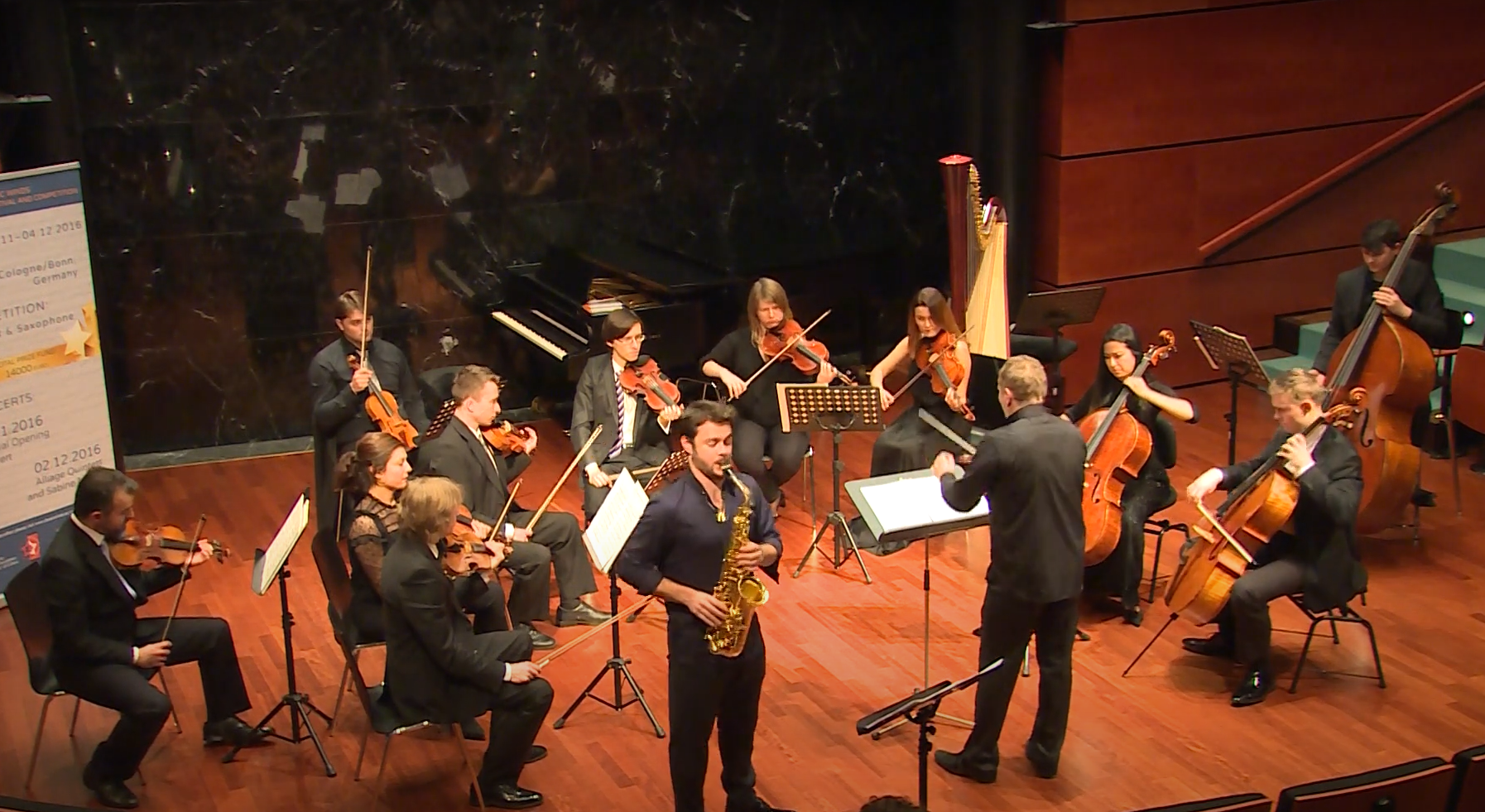
Saxophone concerto

A saxophone concerto is a type of musical composition composed for a solo saxophone player accompanied by a large ensemble, such as a concert band or orchestra.

== Notable examples ==
- Kōmei Abe
  - Divertimento for Alto Saxophone (1951)
- John Adams
  - Saxophone Concerto (2013)
- John Corigliano
  - Triathlon for Saxophonist and Orchestra (2020)
- Alexander Glazunov
  - Saxophone Concerto (1934)
- Jennifer Higdon
  - Saxophone Concerto (2007)
- Jacques Ibert
  - Concertino da camera (1935)
- Michael Kamen
  - Saxophone Concerto (1989)
- Lars-Erik Larsson
  - Saxophone Concerto (1934)
- James MacMillan
  - Saxophone Concerto (2017)
- Augusta Read Thomas
  - Hemke Concerto (2013)
- Mark-Anthony Turnage
  - Your Rockaby (1993)
