= Los Angeles Philharmonic discography =

This is a complete list of recordings by the Los Angeles Philharmonic, shown alphabetically by conductor, and then by recording label.

== John Adams ==
=== DG Concerts — recorded live at Walt Disney Concert Hall ===
- Adams: The Dharma at Big Sur (Leila Josefowicz, electric violin) (world premiere recording)
- Kraft: Timpani Concerto No. 1 (Joseph Pereira, timpani)
- Rosenman: Suite from Rebel Without a Cause

== Stefan Asbury ==
=== DG Concerts — recorded live at Walt Disney Concert Hall ===
- Reich: Tehillim (with Synergy Vocals)
- Reich: Three Movements for Orchestra
- Reich: Variations for Winds, Strings and Keyboard

== Leonard Bernstein ==
=== Deutsche Grammophon ===
- Barber: Adagio for Strings
- Bernstein: Overture to Candide
- Bernstein: Symphonic Dances from West Side Story
- Copland: Appalachian Spring
- Donizetti: Messa di Requiem (Recorded live at the Dorothy Chandler Pavilion) (Katia Ricciarelli, soprano; Agnes Baltsa, mezzo-soprano; Plácido Domingo, tenor; Samuel Ramey, bass; Robert Lloyd, bass; Los Angeles Master Chorale)
- Gershwin: Rhapsody in Blue (Leonard Bernstein, piano)
- William Schuman: American Festival Overture

== Andrey Boreyko ==
=== Yarlung Records ===
- Lutosławski: Chain II (Martin Chalifour, violin)

== Fritz Busch ==
=== Guild ===
- Beethoven: Overture, "Egmont", Op. 84
- Schubert: Dance Suite for Orchestra (arr. Busch)
- Wagner: Prelude and Interlude from Die Meistersinger von Nürnberg, Act III
- Wagner: Prelude and Liebestodt from Tristan und Isolde

== Aaron Copland ==
=== Naxos ===
- Copland: El Salón México
- Copland: Clarinet Concerto (Benny Goodman, clarinet)
- Copland: Fanfare for the Common Man
- Copland: Suite, Appalachian Spring
- Copland: Suite from The Tender Land (Los Angeles Master Chorale: Roger Wagner, music director)

== Gustavo Dudamel ==
=== Deutsche Grammophon ===
- Adams: The Gospel According to the Other Mary (Kelley O'Connor and Tamara Mumford, mezzo-soprano; Brian Cummings, Daniel Bubeck, Nathan Medley, counter-tenors; Russell Thomas, tenor; Los Angeles Master Chorale) (world premiere recording)
- Adams: Must the Devil Have All the Good Tunes? (Yuja Wang, piano) (world premiere recording)
- Ives: Symphony No. 1
- Ives: Symphony No. 2
- Ives: Symphony No. 3, "The Camp Meeting"
- Ives: Symphony No. 4
- Mahler: Symphony No. 8
- Mahler: Symphony No. 9
- Norman: Sustain (world premiere recording)
- Tchaikovsky: The Nutcracker (complete ballet score)
- Verdi: Messa da Requiem (Julianna Di Giacomo, soprano; Michelle DeYoung, mezzo-soprano; Vittorio Grigolo, tenor; Ildebrando D'Arcangelo, bass; Los Angeles Master Chorale)
- Williams: "Fawkes The Phoenix" from Harry Potter and the Chamber of Secrets
- Williams: "Harry's Wondrous World" from Harry Potter and the Philosopher's Stone
- Williams: "Hedwig's Theme" from Harry Potter and the Philosopher's Stone
- Williams: "The Flight to Neverland" from Hook
- Williams: "Out to Sea"/"The Shark Cage Fugue" from Jaws
- Williams: Adagio from Star Wars: The Force Awakens
- Williams: Excerpts from Close Encounters of the Third Kind
- Williams: The Imperial March from The Empire Strikes Back
- Williams: Marion's Theme from Raiders of the Lost Ark
- Williams: Olympic Fanfare and Theme
- Williams: The Raiders March from Raiders of the Lost Ark
- Williams: Sayuri's Theme from Memoirs of a Geisha
- Williams: Scherzo For Motorcycle And Orchestra from Indiana Jones And The Last Crusade
- Williams: Superman's March from Superman
- Williams: Theme from Jurassic Park
- Williams: Theme from Schindler's List (Simone Porter, violin)
- Williams: Throne Room and Finale from Star Wars
- Williams: Yoda's Theme from The Empire Strikes Back

=== DG Concerts — recorded live at Walt Disney Concert Hall ===
- Adams: City Noir (Carrie Dennis, viola; Timothy McAllister, alto saxophone; William Lane, horn; Donald Green, trumpet; James Miller, trombone) (world premiere recording)
- Adams: Slonimsky's Earbox
- Bartók: Concerto for Orchestra
- Berlioz: Symphonie fantastique
- Bernstein: Symphony No. 1, Jeremiah (Kelley O'Connor, mezzo-soprano)
- Brahms: Symphony No. 4
- Debussy: La Mer
- Donizetti: La fille du régiment, "Ah mes amis" (Juan Diego Flórez, tenor)
- Granda (arr. Flórez): "La flor de la canela" (Juan Diego Flórez, tenor)
- Grever: Júrame (Todos dicenques...) (Juan Diego Flórez, tenor)
- Gutierrez (arr. Pena): Alma llanera (Juan Diego Flórez, tenor)
- Lara (arr. Guinovart): "Granada" (Juan Diego Flórez, tenor)
- Mahler: Symphony No. 1
- Márquez: Danzón no. 2
- Moncayo: Huapango
- Rossini: Overture, La gazza ladra
- Rossini: La Cenerentola, "Principe più non se" (Juan Diego Flórez, tenor)
- Rossini: Overture, Semiramide
- Rossini: Semiramide, "La speranza più soave" (Juan Diego Flórez, tenor)
- Stravinsky: The Firebird (complete ballet)
- Verdi: Rigoletto, "La donna è mobile" (Juan Diego Flórez, tenor)

=== Nonesuch ===
- Adès: Dante (Los Angeles Master Chorale)

=== OMM ===
- Philip Glass: Double Piano Concerto (Katia & Marielle Labéque, Piano) Only at iTunes

== Christoph Eschenbach ==
=== DG Concerts — recorded live at Walt Disney Concert Hall ===
- Dvořák: Carnival Overture, Op. 92
- Dvořák: Symphony No. 9, Op. 95: "From the New World"

== Lawrence Foster ==
=== New World Records ===
- Weiss: American Life

=== Twentieth Century Fox ===
- Soundtrack from the film The Turning Point

== Carlo Maria Giulini ==
=== Deutsche Grammophon ===
- Beethoven: Symphony No. 3, "Eroica"
- Beethoven: Symphony No. 5
- Beethoven: Symphony No. 6
- Bizet: Carmen, "La fleur que tu m’avais jetee" (Plácido Domingo, tenor)
- Bizet: Les pêcheurs de perles, "Je crois entendre encore" (Plácido Domingo, tenor)
- Brahms: Symphony No. 1
- Brahms: Symphony No. 2
- Chopin: Andante spianato and Grande Polonaise for piano & orchestra, Opus 22 (Krystian Zimerman, piano)
- Chopin: Piano Concerto No. 1 (Krystian Zimerman, piano)
- Chopin: Piano Concerto No. 2 (Krystian Zimerman, piano)
- Debussy: La Mer
- Donizetti: L'elisir d'amore, "Una furtive lagrima" (Plácido Domingo, tenor; Roger Wagner Chorale)
- Donizetti: Lucia di Lammermoor, "Tombe degl’avi miei" – "Fra poco a me ricovero" (Plácido Domingo, tenor)
- Flotow: Martha, "Ach, so fromm" (Plácido Domingo, tenor)
- Halevy: La Juive, "Rachel, quand du Seigneur la grace tutelaire" (Plácido Domingo, tenor)
- Meyerbeer: L'Africaine, "Pays merveilleux . . . O paradis" (Plácido Domingo, tenor)
- Ravel: Ma Mère l'Oye
- Ravel: Rapsodie espagnole
- Respighi: Roman Festivals
- Schumann: Manfred Overture
- Schumann: Symphony No. 3, "Rhenish"
- Strauss: Don Juan
- Tchaikovsky: Symphony No. 6, "Pathétique"
- Verdi: Aida, "Se quell guerrier io fossi!" – "Celeste Aida" (Plácido Domingo, tenor)
- Verdi: Don Carlo, "Fontainebleau! Foresta immense e solitaria!" (Plácido Domingo, tenor)
- Verdi: Ernani, "Merce, kiletti amici . . . Come rugiada al cespite" (Plácido Domingo, tenor)
- Verdi: Falstaff (Complete Opera. Recorded live at the Dorothy Chandler Pavilion) (Renato Bruson, Katia Ricciarelli, Lucia Valentini-Terrani, Barbara Hendricks, Brenda Boozer, Dalmacio Gonzalez, Leo Nucci, Francis Egerton, William Wildermann, and the Los Angeles Master Chorale)
- Verdi: Il trovatore, "Ah si, ben mio . . . l'onda de-suoni mistici . . . Di quella"; (Plácido Domingo, tenor; Roger Wagner Chorale)

== John Harbison ==
=== New World Records ===
- Harbison: The Natural World (Janice Felty, mezzo-soprano)

== Herbert von Karajan ==
=== Pristine Audio (recorded live at the Hollywood Bowl, 2 July 1959) ===
- Ives: The Unanswered Question
- Mozart: Symphony No. 35 in D major, K. 385 – "Haffner"
- Smith/Key: "The Star-Spangled Banner"
- Richard Strauss: Ein Heldenleben, Op. 40 (David Frisina, Violin)
- Wagner: Overture, Die Meistersinger von Nürnberg

== Otto Klemperer ==
=== Historical recordings appearing on multiple labels (Archipel Records, archiphon, Deutsche Grammophon, Grammofono 2000) ===
- Bach: Air, from Suite for Orchestra No. 3, BWV 1068
- Beethoven: Symphony No. 5 in C minor
- Berlioz: Overture, Benvenuto Cellini, H. 76b (Op. 23)
- Brahms: Piano Quartet in G minor, op.25 (orch. Arnold Schoenberg)
- Corelli: "La Folia" from Op. 5, No. 12 (Orchestral Version) (Joseph Szigeti, violin)
- Debussy: Prélude à l'après-midi d'un faune (Anthony Linden, flute)
- Gershwin: Second Prelude for Piano (orchestrated by David Broekman) (George Gershwin Memorial Concert, Aug 8, 1937)
- Liszt: Totentatz for piano and orchestra (Bernardo Segall, piano)
- Mozart: Symphony No. 35 in D major, K. 385 – "Haffner"
- Puccini: La Bohème: "Che gelida manina"; "Mi chiamano Mimi"; "O soave fanciulla" (Lucrezia Bori, soprano; Joseph Bentonelli, tenor)
- Schoenberg: Quartet Concerto (after Handel, concerto grosso Op. 6 No. 7) (with Kolisch Quartet)
- Johann Strauss, Jr.: Overture, Die Fledermaus
- Richard Strauss: Don Juan
- Richard Strauss: Till Eulenspiegels lustige Streiche (Till Eulenspiegel's Merry Pranks), tone poem for orchestra, Op. 28 (TrV 171)
- Thomas: Overture, Mignon
- Verdi: Overture, I Vespri Siciliani
- Wagner: Overture, Die Meistersinger von Nürnberg

== Sergei Koussevitzky ==
=== Iron Needle (live at the Hollywood Bowl: August 1948) ===
- Rachmaninov: Piano Concerto No. 3, Op. 30 (Vladimir Horowitz, piano)

=== Rockport Records (live at the Hollywood Bowl: Sept 3, 1949) ===
- Prokofiev: Symphony No. 1 in D major, Op. 25 – "Classical"
- Rachmaninov: Piano Concerto No. 2 in C Minor, Op. 18 (Artur Rubinstein, piano)

== Reinbert de Leeuw ==
=== DG Concerts — recorded live at Walt Disney Concert Hall ===
- Andriessen: Racconto Dall'Inferno
- Andriessen: de Staat
- Pärt: Tabula Rasa

=== Nonesuch ===
- Andriessen: Theatre of the World

== Erich Leinsdorf ==
=== EMI Classics/Seraphim ===
- Debussy: La Mer
- Dvořák: Symphony No. 9, "From the New World"
- Grieg: Piano Concerto (Leonard Pennario, piano)
- Rachmaninov: Rhapsody on a Theme of Paganini, Op. 43 (Leonard Pennario, piano)
- Ravel: Daphnis and Chloé, Suite No. 2
- Strauss: Death and Transfiguration
- Tchaikovsky: Piano Concerto No. 1 (Leonard Pennario, piano)
- Tchaikovsky: Symphony No. 6, "Pathétique"
- Wagner: Prelude and Liebestodt from Tristan und Isolde

=== Sheffield Lab Records ===
- Debussy: Prélude à l'après-midi d'un faune
- Prokofiev: Suite from Romeo & Juliet
- Stravinsky: Suite, The Firebird
- Wagner: Ride of the Valkyries; Prelude to Tristan und Isolde; Siegfried's Funeral Music; Forest Murmurs

== Jesús López-Cobos ==
=== Musical Heritage Society ===
- Goldmark: Rustic Wedding Symphony, Op. 26 (Ländliche Hochzeit)

== Neville Marriner ==
=== Yarlung Records ===
- Mozart: Violin Concerto No. 5 (Martin Chalifour, violin)

== Zubin Mehta ==
=== Atlantic/WEA ===
"The 3 Tenors in Concert 1994" (with the Los Angeles Music Center Opera Chorus)

- Ernesto De Curtis: "Non ti scordar di me" (Luciano Pavarotti, tenor)
- De Curtis: "Tu, ca nun chiagne!" (José Carreras, tenor)
- Agustín Lara: "Granada" (Plácido Domingo, tenor)
- Leoncavallo: Pagliacci, "Vesti la Giubba" (Plácido Domingo, tenor)
- Massenet: Le Cid: "O Souverain, Ô Juge, Ô Père" (José Carreras, tenor)
- Massenet: Werther, " Pourquoi Me Réveiller" (Luciano Pavarotti, tenor)
- Puccini: Turandot, "Nessun Dorma" (Luciano Pavarotti, tenor)
- Richard Rodgers: Spring Is Here, "With a Song in My Heart" (José Carreras, tenor)
- Federico Moreno Torroba: Maravilla, "Amor, Vida De Mi Vida" (Plácido Domingo, tenor)

=== RCA Red Seal ===
- Beethoven: Violin Concerto (Pinchas Zukerman, violin)
- Brahms: Violin Concerto in D, Op. 77 (Pinchas Zukerman, violin)
- Respighi: Feste Romane (Roman Festivals)
- Richard Strauss: Don Juan, Op. 20

=== Cambria ===
- Kraft: Concerto for Four Percussionists & Orchestra (Charles DeLancey, Forrest Clark, William Kraft, Walter Goodwin, percussionists)
- Kraft: Contextures: Riots - Decade '60

=== London/Decca ===
- Beethoven: Piano Concerto No. 5 in E-flat, Op. 73, "Emperor" (Alicia de Larrocha, piano)
- Bernstein: Overture, Candide
- Bizet: Preludes to Acts 1 and 4, Carmen
- Bruckner: Symphony No. 4, "Romantic"
- Bruckner: Symphony No. 8
- Copland: Suite, Appalachian Spring
- Copland: Fanfare for the Common Man
- Copland: Lincoln Portrait (Gregory Peck, Narrator)
- Dvořák: Carnival Overture
- Dvořák: Symphony No. 8
- Dvořák: Symphony No. 9, "From the New World"
- Elgar: Variations on an Original Theme (Enigma), Op. 36
- Gershwin: An American in Paris
- Haydn: Concerto for Trumpet and Orchestra in E-flat Major (Thomas Stevens, trumpet)
- Holst: The Planets, Op 32 (Women of the Los Angeles Master Chorale)
- Ives: Decoration Day
- Ives: Symphony No. 1
- Ives: Symphony No. 2
- Ives: Variations on America
- Kraft: Concerto for Four Percussion Soloists and Orchestra
- Liszt: Battle of the Huns
- Liszt: Orpheus
- Liszt: Mazeppa
- Mahler: Rückert-Lieder (Marilyn Horne, mezzo-soprano)
- Mahler: Songs of a Wayfarer (Marilyn Horne, mezzo-soprano)
- Mahler: Symphony No. 3 (Maureen Forrester, contralto; Women of the Los Angeles Master Chorale; California Boys Choir)
- Mahler: Symphony No. 5
- Mahler: Adagio from Symphony No. 10
- Mozart: Overture, Le nozze di Figaro
- Mussorgsky: Pictures at an Exhibition (orch. Ravel)
- Nielsen: Symphony No. 4, "Inextinguishable"
- Ravel: Bolero
- Ravel: Daphnis and Chloé, Suite No. 2
- Ravel: La Valse
- Ravel: Ma Mère l'Oye
- Rimsky-Korsakov: Scheherazade (Sidney Harth, violin)
- Rossini: Overture, La gazza ladra
- Saint-Saëns: Symphony No. 3, "Organ" (Anita Priest, organ)
- Schoenberg: Chamber Symphony, Op. 9
- Schoenberg: Variations for Orchestra, Op. 31
- Scriabin: Symphony No. 4, The Poem of Ecstasy
- Schoenberg: Verklärte Nacht
- Johann Strauss, Jr.: Overture, Die Fledermaus
- Richard Strauss: Also sprach Zarathustra, Op. 30
- Richard Strauss: An Alpine Symphony, Op. 64
- Richard Strauss: Don Quixote, Op. 35 (Kurt Reher, Cello; Jan Hlinka, Viola)
- Richard Strauss: Ein Heldenleben, Op. 40 (David Frisina, Violin)
- Richard Strauss: Sinfonia Domestica, Op. 53
- Stravinsky: Circus Polka
- Stravinsky: Petrushka
- Stravinsky: The Rite of Spring
- Tchaikovsky: Fantasy Overture, Romeo and Juliet
- Tchaikovsky: Slavonic March, Op. 31
- Tchaikovsky: Solemn Overture, 1812
- Tchaikovsky: Symphony No. 1 in G minor, Op. 13 – "Winter Reveries"
- Tchaikovsky: Symphony No. 2 in C Minor, Op. 17 – "Little Russian"
- Tchaikovsky: Symphony No. 3 in D, Op. 29 - "Polish"
- Tchaikovsky: Symphony No. 4 in F Minor, Op. 36
- Tchaikovsky: Symphony No. 5 in E Minor, Op. 64
- Tchaikovsky: Symphony No. 6 in B Minor, Op. 74 – "Pathetique"
- Varèse: Arcana
- Varèse: Intégrales
- Varèse: Ionisation
- Verdi: Four Sacred Pieces (Yvonne Minton, mezzo-soprano; Los Angeles Master Chorale)
- Verdi: Overture, La forza del destino
- Vivaldi: Piccolo Concerto in A minor, P.83 (Miles Zentner, piccolo)
- Franz von Suppé: Overture, Poet and Peasant
- Wagner: Overture, Rienze
- Weber: Overture, Der Freischütz
- Weber: Clarinet Concertino, Op. 26 (Michele Zukovsky, clarinet)
- Wieniawski: Polonaise de Concert, Op. 4 (Glenn Dicterow, violin)
- Wieniawski: Scherzo-Tarentelle, Op. 16 (Glenn Dicterow, violin)
- Williams: Excerpts from Close Encounters of the Third Kind
- Williams: Star Wars Suite

=== Myto Records — recorded live in the Dorothy Chandler Pavilion (Nov 14, 1967) ===
- Verdi: Messa da Requiem (Gwyneth Jones, soprano; Grace Bumbry, mezzo-soprano; Franco Corelli, tenor; Ezio Flagello, baritone; Los Angeles Master Chorale)

=== Sony Classical ===
- Bartók: Violin Concerto No. 2
- Bruch: Violin Concerto No. 1 (Pinchas Zukerman, violin)
- Lalo: Symphonie espagnole, for violin and orchestra in D minor, Op. 21 (Pinchas Zukerman, violin)

== David Alan Miller ==
=== Harmonia Mundi ===
- Powell: Duplicates: A Concerto for Two Pianos (Alan Feinberg and Robert Taub, pianos) (recorded live at the Los Angeles Music Center, January 28, 1990)
- Powell: Setting for Two Pianos (Bryan Pezzone and Trina Dye, pianos)
- Powell: Modules: An Intermezzo for Chamber Orchestra

== Stu Phillips ==
=== Intrada ===
- Phillips: Original Television Soundtrack, Battlestar Galactica: Volume 1, "Saga of the Worlds"

== André Previn ==
=== Elektra/Nonesuch ===
- Kraft: Contextures II: The Final Beast (Mary Rawcliffe, soprano; Jonathan Mack, tenor; New Albion Ensemble; Pasadena Boys Choir)

=== New World Records ===
- Harbison: Concerto for Double Brass Choir and Orchestra
- Shapero: Symphony for Classical Orchestra
- Shapero: Nine Minute Overture

=== Philips Classics ===
- Debussy: Prélude à l'après-midi d'un faune (Janet Ferguson, flute)
- Dukas: L'Apprenti sorcier
- Glinka: Overture, Russlan and Ludmilla
- Ibert, Escales
- Mussorgsky: Night on Bald Mountain
- Prokofiev: Scythian Suite, for orchestra, Op. 20
- Prokofiev: Symphony No. 1, "Classical"
- Prokofiev: Symphony No. 5
- Prokofiev: Symphony No. 6
- Prokofiev: Symphony No. 7, Op. 131
- Prokofiev Symphony-Concerto Op. 125 for Cello and Orchestra (Heinrich Schiff, cello)
- Ravel: Daphnis and Chloé, Suite No. 2 (Anne Diener Giles, flute)
- Smetana: The Moldau
- Tchaikovsky: Fantasy Overture, Romeo and Juliet

=== Telarc Records ===
- Bartók: Concerto for Orchestra
- Dvořák: Carnival Overture, Op. 92
- Dvořák: Nocturne for string orchestra in B major (arr. from Str. Qrt. No. 4 & Str. Qnt. B. 49), B. 47 (Op. 40)
- Dvořák: Overture, My Home, Op. 62
- Dvořák: Scherzo Capriccioso, Op. 88
- Dvořák: Symphony No. 7
- Dvořák: Symphony No. 8
- Dvořák: Symphony No. 9, Op. 95, "From the New World"
- Janáček: Sinfonietta
- Prokofiev: Alexander Nevsky (Christine Cairns, mezzo-soprano; Los Angeles Master Chorale)
- Prokofiev: Suite, Lieutenant Kijé

== Simon Rattle ==
=== EMI Classics ===
- Rachmaninov: Symphony No. 2 in E minor, Op. 27

== David Robertson ==
=== Canary Classics ===
- Mackey: Stumble to Grace (Orli Shaham, piano)

=== Cantaloupe Music ===
- Gordon: Dystopia

== Artur Rodziński ==
=== Eklipse ===
- Beethoven: Ah! perfido ... Per pietà, non dirmi addio", scena and aria for soprano & orchestra, Op. 65 (Stella Roman, soprano)
- Giordano: Andrea Chénier, "La mamma morta" (Stella Roman, soprano)
- Korngold: Die tote Stadt, Op. 12, "Glück das mir verblieb" (Stella Roman, soprano)
- Puccini: Manon Lescaut, "In quelle trine morbide" (Stella Roman, soprano)
- Puccini: Tosca, "Vissi d'arte" (Stella Roman, soprano)
- Verdi: La forza del destino, "Pace, Pace, mio Dio!" (Stella Roman, soprano)

== Esa-Pekka Salonen ==
=== Deutsche Grammophon ===
- Bartók: Suite, The Miraculous Mandarin
- Mussorgsky: St. John's Night on the Bare Mountain (original version)
- Salonen: Helix
- Salonen: Piano Concerto (Yefim Bronfman, piano)
- Shostakovich (orchestration by Gerard McBurney): Prologue to Orango—Ryan McKinny (Veselchak, bass-baritone), Jordan Bisch (Voice from the Crowd/Bass, bass), Michael Fabiano (Zoologist, tenor), Eugene Brancoveanu (Orango, baritone), Yulia Van Doren (Susanna, soprano), Timur Bekbosunov (Paul Mash, tenor), Los Angeles Master Chorale (Grant Gershon, music director) (world premiere recording)
- Shostakovich: Symphony No. 4 in C minor, Op. 43
- Stravinsky: The Rite of Spring

=== DG Concerts — recorded live at Walt Disney Concert Hall ===
- Beethoven: Symphony No. 5
- Beethoven: Symphony No. 7
- Beethoven: Symphony No. 8
- Beethoven: Overture, Leonore No. 2
- Debussy: La Mer
- Falla: El amor brujo
- Anders Hillborg: Eleven Gates (world premiere recording)
- Hindemith: Symphonic Metamorphoses on Themes of Weber
- Husa: Music for Prague 1968
- Ligeti: Concert românesc
- Lutosławski: Concerto for Orchestra
- Lutosławski: Symphony No. 4
- Mosolov: Iron Foundry
- Pärt: Symphony No. 4, "Los Angeles" (world premiere recording)
- Prokofiev: Suite from Romeo & Juliet
- Ravel: Ma Mère l'Oye
- Ravel: Piano Concerto for the Left Hand in D (Jean-Yves Thibaudet, piano)
- Salonen: Helix
- Sibelius: Symphony No. 2 in D major for orchestra, Op. 43
- Shostakovich: Music from Lady Macbeth of Mtensk District
- Shostakovich: Suite from The Nose
- Stravinsky: The Firebird
- Wagner: Die Meistersinger von Nürnberg, Prelude
- Wagner: Die Meistersinger von Nürnberg, "Was duftet doch der Flieder" (Bryn Terfel, bass-baritone)
- Wagner: Die Walküre, The Ride of the Valkyries
- Wagner: Die Walküre, Wotan's Farewell and Magic Fire Music (Bryn Terfel, bass-baritone)
- Wagner: Lohengrin, Prelude to Act III
- Wagner: Tannhäuser, "O du, mein holder Abendstern" (Bryn Terfel, bass-baritone)

=== ECM ===
- Pärt: Symphony No. 4, "Los Angeles"

=== Nonesuch ===
- Adams: Naïve and Sentimental Music

=== Ondine ===
- Saariaho: Du cristal ...
- Saariaho: ... à la fumée (Petri Alanko, alto flute; Anssi Karttunen, cello)

=== Philips Classics ===
- Bartók: Violin Concerto No. 2 (Viktoria Mullova, violin)
- Stravinsky: Violin Concerto (Viktoria Mullova, violin)

=== Sony Classical ===
- Bach: Transcriptions (by Elgar, Mahler, Schoenberg, Stokowski, Webern)
- Bartók: Concerto for Orchestra
- Bartók: Music for Strings, Percussion, and Celesta
- Bartók: Concerto for Piano No. 1, Sz. 83 (Yefim Bronfman, piano)
- Bartók: Concerto for Piano No. 2, Sz. 95 (Yefim Bronfman, piano)
- Bartók: Concerto for Piano No. 3, Sz. 119 (Yefim Bronfman, piano)
- Bruckner: Symphony No. 4, "Romantic"
- Debussy: Prélude à l'après-midi d'un faune (Janet Ferguson, flute)
- Debussy: La Mer
- Debussy: Images pour orchestre
- Debussy: Trois nocturnes (Women of the Los Angeles Master Chorale)
- Debussy: Le martyre de St. Sébastien (Fragments symphoniques)
- Debussy: La Damoiselle élue (Dawn Upshaw, soprano; Paula Rasmussen, mezzo-soprano; Women of the Los Angeles Master Chorale)
- Goldmark: Concerto for Violin and Orchestra (Joshua Bell, violin)
- Hermann: Excerpts, Torn Curtain
- Hermann: Overture, North by Northwest
- Hermann: Prelude, The Man Who Knew Too Much
- Hermann: Suite, Psycho
- Hermann: Suite, Marnie
- Hermann: Suite, Vertigo
- Hermann: Suite, Fahrenheit 451
- Hermann: Suite, Taxi Driver
- Hindemith: Mathis der Maler (symphony)
- Hindemith: Symphonic Metamorphosis on Themes of Weber
- Hindemith: The Four Temperaments (Emanuel Ax, piano)
- Lutosławski: Symphony No. 1
- Lutosławski: Symphony No. 2
- Lutosławski: Symphony No. 3
- Lutosławski: Symphony No. 4
- Lutosławski: Piano Concerto (Paul Crossley, piano)
- Lutosławski: Chantefleurs et Chantefables (Dawn Upshaw, soprano)
- Lutosławski: Fanfare for Los Angeles Philharmonic
- Lutosławski: Les Espaces du sommeil (John Shirley-Quirk, baritone)
- Mahler: Symphony No. 3 (Anna Larsson, contralto; Ralph Sauer, trombone; Donald Green, posthorn; Martin Chalifour, violin; Paulist Boy Choristers of California, Women of the Los Angeles Master Chorale)
- Mahler: Symphony No. 4 (Barbara Hendricks, soprano)
- Mahler: Das Lied von der Erde (Plácido Domingo, tenor; Bo Skovhus, baritone)
- Marsalis: All Rise (Wynton Marsalis, trumpet; Lincoln Center Jazz Orchestra; Paul Smith Singers; Northridge Singers of California State University; Morgan State University Choir)
- Prokofiev: Violin Concertos Nos. 1 and 2 (Cho-Liang Lin, violin)
- Revueltas: Homenaje a Federico García Lorca
- Revueltas: La noche de los mayas
- Revueltas: Ocho por radio
- Revueltas: Sensemayá
- Revueltas: Ventanas for Large Orchestra
- Revueltas: First Little Serious Piece
- Revueltas: Second Little Serious Piece
- Salonen: Cello Concerto (Yo-Yo Ma, cello)
- Salonen: Gambit
- Salonen: Giro
- Salonen: LA Variations
- Shostakovich: Piano Concerto No. 1 (Yefim Bronfman, piano; Thomas Stevens, trumpet)
- Shostakovich: Piano Concerto No. 2 (Yefim Bronfman, piano)
- Sibelius: Concerto for Violin and Orchestra (Joshua Bell, violin)
- Sibelius: En saga
- Sibelius: Kullervo Symphony, Op. 7 (Marianna Rorholm, mezzo-soprano; Jorma Hynninen, baritone; Helsinki University Men's Chorus)
- Sibelius: Lemminkäinen Legends, Op 22 (Four Legends from the Kalevala)
- Stravinsky: Violin Concerto (Cho-Liang Lin, violin)

=== Zappa Records ===
- Frank Zappa: 200 Motels: The Suites (Los Angeles Master Chorale: Grant Gershon, music director)

== Calvin Simmons ==
=== New World Records ===
- Carpenter: Krazy Kat
- Gilbert: The Dance in Place Congo
- Powell: Rhapsodie Nègre (Zita Carno, piano)

== William Steinberg ==
=== Cembal D'amour ===
- Tchaikovsky: Violin Concerto in D major, Op. 35 (Jascha Heifetz, violin)

== Leopold Stokowski ==
=== EMI Classics/Seraphim ===
- Holst: The Planets, Op. 32 (Women of the Roger Wagner Chorale)

== Igor Stravinsky ==
=== Deutsche Grammophon ===
- Smith (arr: Stravinsky): "The Star-Spangled Banner"
- Stravinsky: Divertimento from Le Baiser de la fée (The Fairy's Kiss)
- Stravinsky: Scene 4 from Petrushka

== Michael Tilson Thomas ==
=== Sony Classical ===
- Bernstein: Music from Mass (Peter Hofmann, Deborah Sasson)
- Bernstein: Music from On the Town (Peter Hoffman, Deborah Sasson)
- Bernstein: Music from West Side Story (Peter Hoffman, Deborah Sasson)
- Gershwin: Rhapsody in Blue (Michael Tilson Thomas, pianist)
- Gershwin: Second Rhapsody, for piano & orchestra, Rhapsody in Rivets (Michael Tilson Thomas, pianist)
- Gershwin: For Lily Pons, for piano (Gershwin Melody No. 79, realized by Michael Tilson Thomas)
- Gershwin: Promenade, for piano or orchestra (arrangement of "Walking the Dog" from Shall we Dance, film)
- Gershwin: Gershwin Live! (Recorded live at the Music Center) (Sarah Vaughan, vocal soloist, Michael Tilson Thomas and pianist). With An American in Paris, Rhapsody in Blue, etc.
- Prokofiev: The Love for Three Oranges, suite for orchestra, Op. 33 bis
- Prokofiev: Lieutenant Kijé, film score and suite for orchestra, Op. 60
- Prokofiev: Overture in B-flat major, Op 42 "American"
- Prokofiev: Music from Cinderella, Op 87
- Respighi: Fountains of Rome
- Respighi: Roman Festivals
- Tchaikovsky: Suite for Orchestra no 3 in G major, Op. 55

== Eduard van Beinum ==
=== Deutsche Grammophon ===
- Andriessen: Symphonic Etude
- Ravel: La Valse

== Alfred Wallenstein ==
=== Angel Records ===
- Brahms: Symphony No. 2 in D, Op. 73

=== Historical Recordings appearing on multiple labels (AURA CLASSICS, Ital Disc Inst) ===
- Franck: Symphonic Variations (Arturo Benedetti Michelangeli, piano)

=== Clarion ===
- Monteverdi: Magnificat I, for 7 voices, 9 winds, 2 violins & cembalo (from Vespers), SV 206/8 (Anita Priest; The Roger Wagner Chorale)
- Respighi: Lauda per la Natività del Signore, for soloists, chorus & ensemble, P. 166 (Marie Gibson, soprano; Marilyn Horne, mezzo-soprano; Charles Bressler, tenor; The Roger Wagner Chorale)

=== Deutsche Grammophon ===
- Beethoven: Piano Concerto No. 4 (Arthur Rubenstein, piano)

=== Doremi Records ===
- Paganini: Violin Concerto No.1 in E flat major (usually transposed to D major), Op. 6, MS 21 (Zino Francescatti, violin)

=== Eklipse ===
- Wagner: Tristan und Isolde: "Wie Lachend Sie Mir Lieder Singen" (Helen Traubel, soprano)

=== EMI Classics/Seraphim ===
- Rachmaninov: Piano Concerto No. 2 (Leonard Pennario, piano)
- Rachmaninov: Symphony No. 2

=== Past Classics ===
- Mozart: Symphony No. 35 in D Major (Haffner), K.385

=== RCA VICTOR ===
- Bach: Violin Concerto No. 1 in A minor, BMW 1041 (Jascha Heifetz, violin)
- Bach: Violin Concerto No. 2 in E, BMW 1042 (Jascha Heifetz, violin)
- Brahms: Hungarian Dances (21) for orchestra, WoO 1 No 7 (Jascha Heifetz, violin)
- Castelnuovo-Tedesco: Concerto for violin & orchestra No. 2, Op 66 "I Profeti" (Jascha Heifetz, violin)
- Chopin: Piano Concerto No. 1 in E minor, Op. 11 (Arthur Rubinstein, piano)
- Chopin: Piano Concerto No. 2 in F minor, Op. 21 (Arthur Rubinstein, piano)
- Korngold: Violin Concerto in D major, Op. 35 (Jascha Heifetz, violin)
- Ravel: Tzigane, rhapsodie de concert (Jascha Heifetz, violin; Stanley Chaloupka, harp)
- Sinding: Suite for violin & orchestra in A Minor, Op 10 ("Suite in the Old Style") (Jascha Heifetz, violin)
- Szymanowski: Symphonie Concertante, Op. 60 (Arthur Rubinstein, piano)
- Tchaikovsky: Sérénade mélancolique, for violin & orchestra (or piano) in B-flat minor, Op. 26 (Jascha Heifetz, violin)

=== Simax ===
- Beethoven: "Ah! perfido! . . . Per pietà, non dirmi addio", scena and aria for soprano & orchestra, Op. 65 (Kirsten Flagstad, soprano)

== Bruno Walter ==
=== Historical recordings appearing on multiple labels (Ital Disc Inst, Eklipse Records, Enterprise, Grammofono 2000, Historical Performers, Urania) ===
- Berlioz: La Damnation de Faust ("légende dramatique") H. 111 (Op. 24) Suite
- Brahms: Schicksalslied, Op.54
- Mozart: German Dances for Orchestra, K. 605
- Mozart: Piano Concerto No. 23 in A, K. 488 (Leon Fleischer, piano)
- Johann Strauss, Jr.: Overture, Der Zigeunerbaron
- Johann Strauss, Jr.: G'schichten Aus Dem Wienerwald, Op.325
- Richard Strauss: Till Eulenspiegels lustige Streiche (Till Eulenspiegel's Merry Pranks), tone poem for orchestra, Op. 28 (TrV 171)
- Tchaikovsky: Fantasy Overture, Romeo and Juliet
- Richard Wagner: Siegfried Idyll
- Weber: Invitation to the Dance, Op. 65 (orch. BERLIOZ)
- Weber: Konzertstück, Op. 79 (Paulina Carter, piano)
- Weber: Overture, Oberon
- Weber: Overture, Der Freischütz

== Pinchas Zukerman (conductor and violin) ==
=== Deutsche Grammophon ===
- Bach: The Six Brandenburg Concertos
- Haydn: Sinfonia Concertante in B-flat, H.I. 105 (Ronald Leonard, cello; Barbara Winters, oboe; David Breidenthal, bassoon)
- Haydn: Violin Concerto in C, H.VIIa No.1

=== Sony Classical ===
- Mozart: Serenade No. 12 for winds in C minor ("Nacht Musique"), K. 388 (K. 384a)
- Mozart: Serenade No. 7 for orchestra in D major ("Haffner"), K. 250 (K. 248b)
- Vivaldi: Violin Concerto in A Minor, RV 356
