= Pat Posey =

American musician (born 1978)

Pat Posey (they)(born 1978) is an American musician, educator, and administrator. They are active as a saxophonist, clarinetist, flutist, and tubaxist.

== Early life and education ==
Posey was born in Columbus, Ohio and grew up in Woodbridge, Virginia. They attended Louisiana State University, earning a Bachelor of Music degree, and the University of Michigan, earning a Master of Music degree. While at Michigan, they were a saxophone student of Donald Sinta.

== Performance career ==
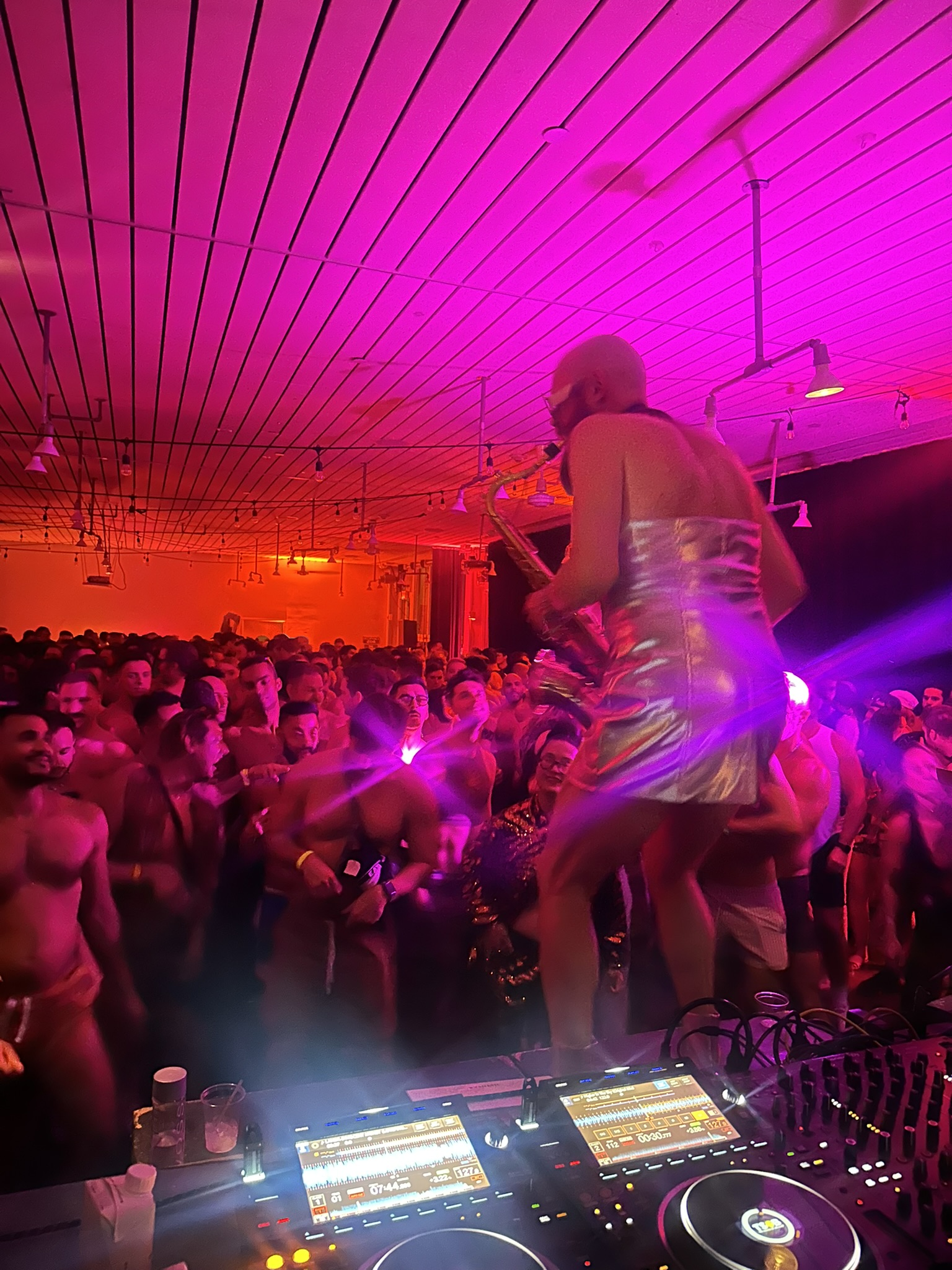
Pat Posey performs in a nightclub

Posey performs as a saxophonist with orchestras, including the San Francisco Symphony, San Diego Symphony, Los Angeles Philharmonic, and Santa Barbara Symphony. They have also performed with the Saint Paul Chamber Orchestra, the New World Symphony, Long Beach Opera, and are principal saxophonist of the San Bernardino Symphony.

Posey performs live with DJs in nightclubs and live on dublab. They appear several dance music tracks including Perfect Lovers' "Pat on the Sax" remix of Whitney Weiss' Temperance on Chinotto Records and Lovefingers' "Root of All Evil Dub" remix of Primal Scream's Innocent Money on BMG, They appear on the track Give Me Love on Miley Cyrus' Grammy-nominated album Something Beautiful. Their debut on ESP Institute was the track AMOK on the "ESP Institute XV" a compilation of highlights and unreleased rarities from the label's 15 years of existence released as a fundraiser for Los Angeles wildfire victims. AMOK is the demo for a full-length solo album that will be released on the label in 2026.

Posey performed as soloist in John Adams' Saxophone Concerto with the Redlands Symphony conducted by Ransom Wilson in October 2022. They have also appeared as a soloist in Germany and Russia. Their debut album they/beast, the first streamable album featuring solo tubax, was released by Avie Records in 2023.

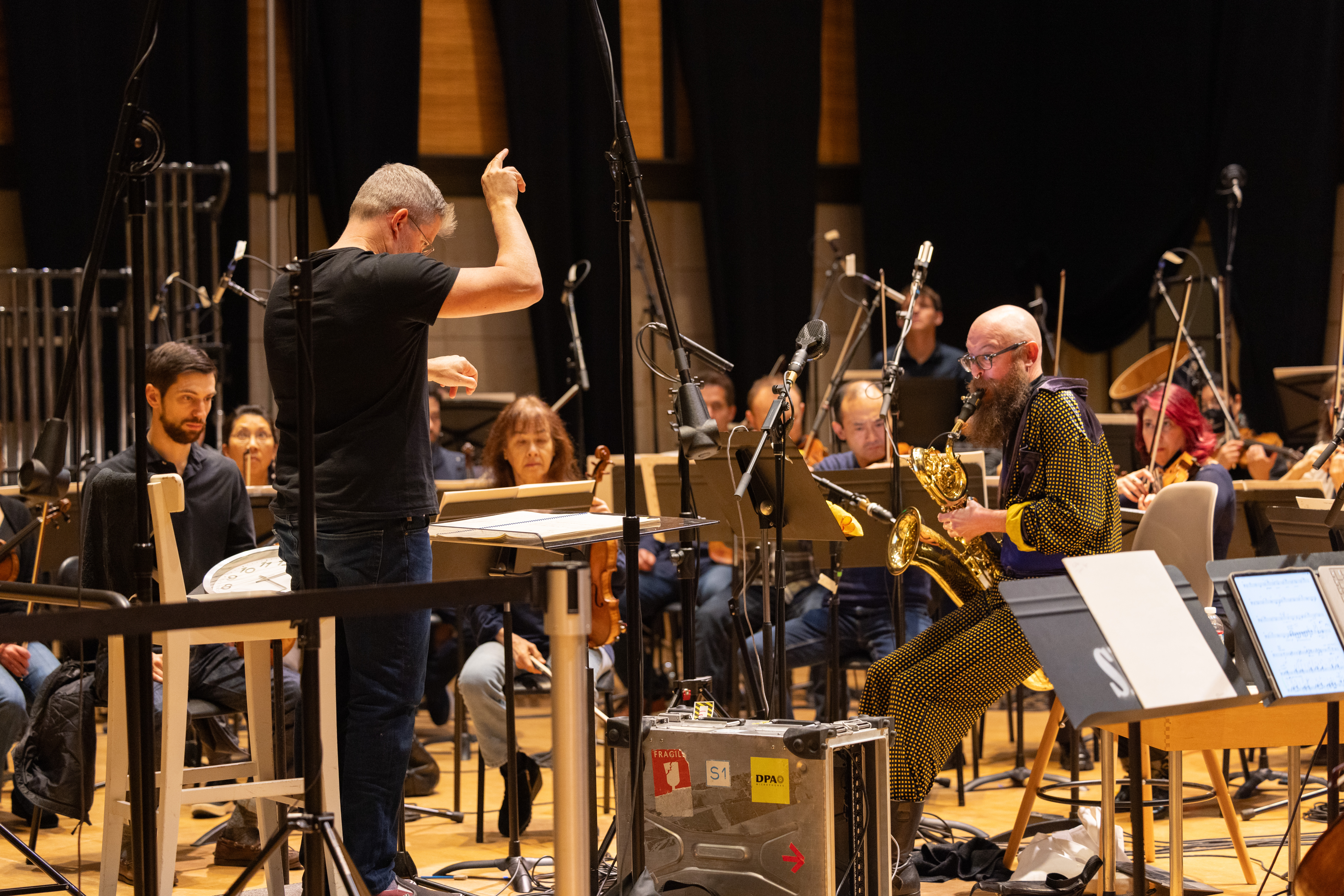
Edwin Outwater leading Pat Posey and the San Francisco Symphony recording Michael Tilson Thomas' Urban Legend for baritone saxophone and orchestra (2024)

Posey played saxophones, clarinets, and tubax in John Powell's score to the 2026 film Minions & Monsters. They appear in two recordings of Prokofiev's Romeo and Juliet; a suite assembled and conducted by Esa Pekka Salonen with the San Francisco Symphony released in 2023 and in the full ballet with the Los Angeles Philharmonic conducted by Gustavo Dudamel released in 2026. In 2024 Posey was soloist with the San Francisco Symphony conducted by Edwin Outwater in the world premiere recording of Michael Tilson Thomas' Urban Legend for baritone saxophone and orchestra. In 2023 Posey performed as baritone saxophonist with Wild Up in the premiere performance of Patrick Shiroishi's Gosenzo for saxophone quartet. They appear playing saxophones and tubax on the Grammy-nominated third volume of the group's Julius Eastman anthology, and tubax on the soundtrack to Transformers: Rise of the Beasts written by Jongnic Bontemps. They were the alto saxophonist in the world premiere of Lewis Spratlin's Invasion with pianist Nadia Shpachenko. In 2021-2022 they performed multiple soprano and baritone saxophone parts on world premiere recordings Psalms and Canticles and Time by Michael Torke. In 2019 they performed as dedicatee in the world premiere performance of Sean Shepherd's Sonate á 5 with Jorja Fleezanis, Karen Dreyfus, Alan Stepansky, and Conor Hanick. In 2011 they performed at Carnegie Hall as guest saxophonist with the Juilliard Orchestra and composer John Adams conducting his work City Noir. In 2012 they performed this work again with Adams at Royal Albert Hall as part of the BBC Proms. They have been a regular collaborator with Rahim AlHaj, and have performed with sitarist Shujaat Hussain Khan and tabla player Yogesh Samsi.

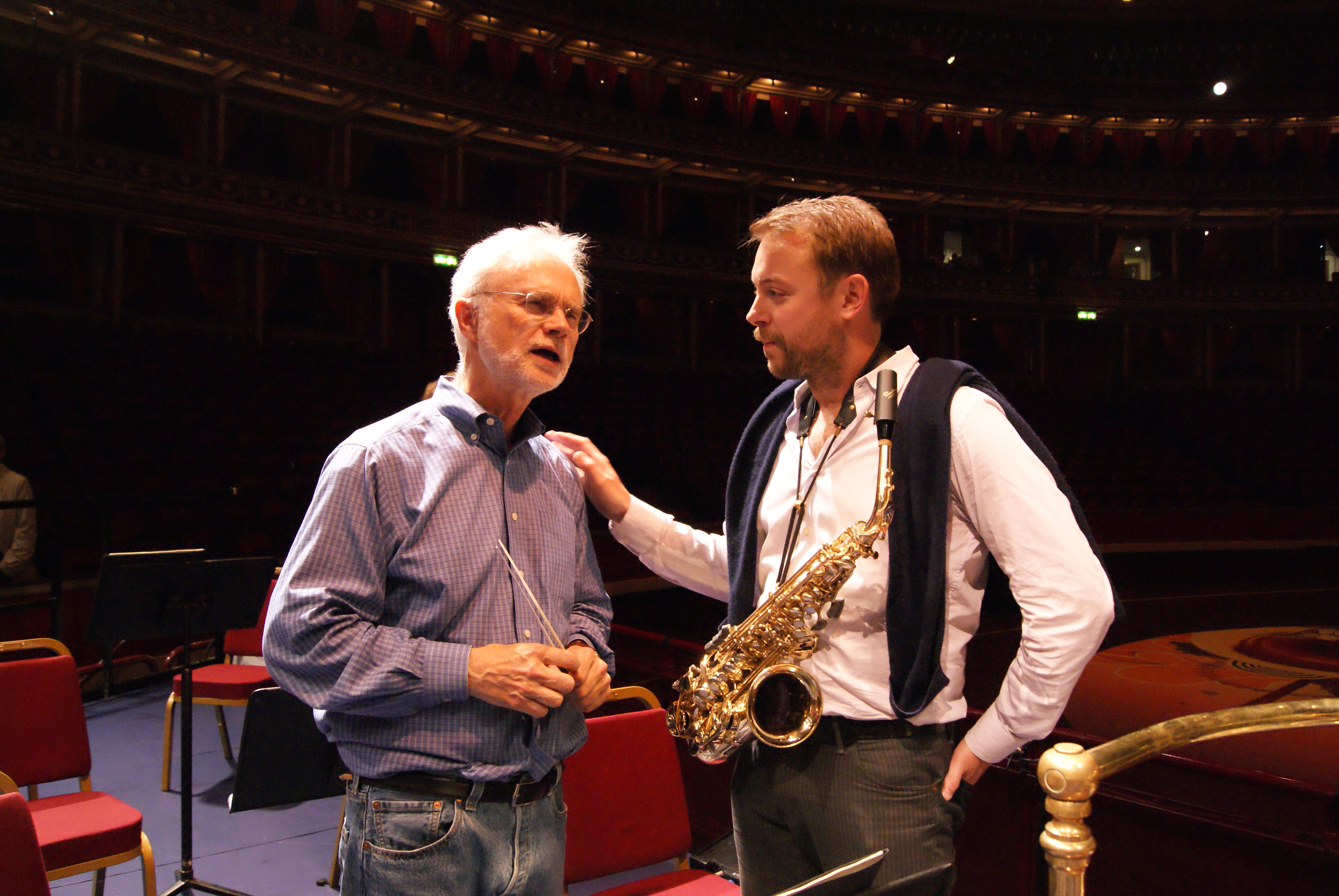
Posey (right) with John Adams onstage at the Royal Albert Hall, BBC Proms, 2012

Posey is a member of Le Train Bleu and a founding member of the Los Angeles Reed Quintet (LARQ). They are a Conn-Selmer Performing Artist.

== Administrative career ==
Posey served as Director of Orchestral Activities and Planning at The Juilliard School from 2007 to 2012, after having held the positions of Assistant Orchestra Librarian, Personnel Manager, and Orchestra Manager in the years prior. They concurrently held administrative positions at the Stamford Symphony Orchestra, Orchestra of St. Lukes, Brevard Music Center, and the Aspen Music Festival and School, and in 2010-11 they were Director of Artistic Operations for the YouTube Symphony Orchestra project in Sydney, Australia.

In September, 2012 they were appointed as Vice President of Artistic Planning and Educational Programs of the Music Academy of the West. They were selected from a field of over 70 applicants following a four-month international search. At the Music Academy they oversaw all artistic matters including the creation of a composer residency program that brought nearly 20 living composers to the summer festival over two years, and led the conception and implementation of partnerships with the New York Philharmonic and London Symphony Orchestra. They left the Music Academy in 2018.

== Teaching career ==
Posey was a Visiting assistant professor of Saxophone at the University of New Mexico. They have also been a member of the performance faculty at the University of Windsor and at the University of Southern California Thornton School of Music, and given pre-concert lectures for the Los Angeles Philharmonic.

== Personal life ==
Posey is queer and began crossdressing in 2019. With longtime friend Colin Campbell they were the victim of a hate crime in Hollywood when a car passing by shot them with airsoft pellets and yelled "faggots" following the 2024 presidential election. They face the transphobic backlash in the US with their art and their whole person and regularly take part in protests against fascism in the US.
