= Triathlon (disambiguation) =

A triathlon is an endurance athletic event consisting of three stages, without a break: swimming, cycling and running, in that order.

Triathlon or Triathlete may also refer to:

== Other three-part sports events ==
- Cross triathlon, swimming, mountain-biking, and trail-running
- Winter triathlon, running, mountain biking, and cross-country skiing
- Athletics at the 1904 Summer Olympics – Men's triathlon, long jump, shot put, and 100-yard dash
- Gymnastics at the 1904 Summer Olympics – Men's triathlon, horizontal bar, parallel bars, and horse
- Eventing, the equestrian triathlon

== Other ==
- Triathlon (concerto), a 2020 saxophone concerto by John Corigliano
- Triathlon, alias of Delroy Garrett, a fictional superhero character in Marvel Comics
- 10346 Triathlon, a main-belt asteroid

== See also ==
- Triathlete, a magazine published by Outside (company)
