= Reed quintet =

Group of five reed players

A reed quintet is a chamber group consisting of an oboe (or English horn), a clarinet, a saxophone (usually alto), a bass clarinet, and a bassoon. The term can refer to the instrumentation itself, a specific group of performers, or a composition written for this instrumentation.

The first reed quintet, the Calefax Reed Quintet, was formed in The Netherlands in 1985 by students of the Barlaeus Gymnasium, making the ensemble a relatively new chamber configuration compared to the similar woodwind quintet, which can trace its roots to the late 18th century. Proponents of the reed quintet highlight the configuration's ability to create a cohesive blend amongst the five voices (compared to the woodwind quintet, whose flute and horn make this more difficult), while maintaining a significant amount of timbral range compared to ensembles such as string quartets or saxophone quartets.

Because of the relative newness of the reed quintet, its repertoire consists of contemporary compositions and arrangements of earlier works. Calefax in particular has added significantly to the body of arrangements for the reed quintet, with many of their albums being entirely made up of arrangements of works by well known composers such as J. S. Bach, Claude Debussy, Maurice Ravel, and Dmitri Shostakovich. Other reed quintets focus more heavily on expanding the original repertoire of the reed quintet by commissioning living composers.

In 2025 the Akropolis Reed Quintet, Pascal Le Bouef, and Christian Euman won the Grammy Award for Best Instrumental Composition for the composition "Strands".

== Notable original compositions for reed quintet ==
- Ton ter Doest: Circusmuziek (1990)
- Matthew Shlomowitz: Line and Length (2007)
- Yannis Kyriakides: Hypothetical Islands (2012)
- Roger Zare: Variations on Reverse Entropy (2012)
- Willem Jeths: Maktub (2013)
- Marc Mellits: Splinter (2014)
- Kyle Bruckmann: Mitigating Factors (2015)
- Nico Muhly: Look For Me (2015)
- Gregory Wanamaker: The Space Between Us (2016)
- Sky Macklay: Choppy (2017)
- Theresa Wong: Letters to a Friend (2017)
- Natalie Draper: Music of Foghorns & Seabirds (2018)
- Michael Gilbertson: Kinds of Light (2018)
- Paula Matthusen: Antenna Studies (2018)
- Niloufar Nourbakhsh: Firing Squad (2018)
- Octavio Vazquez: Alchemical Birds (2018)
- Michael Gordon: Tall Grass (2022)
- Pascal le Bouef: Are We Dreaming the Same Dream? (2024)
