= Kevin Starr =

American historian and librarian (1940–2017)

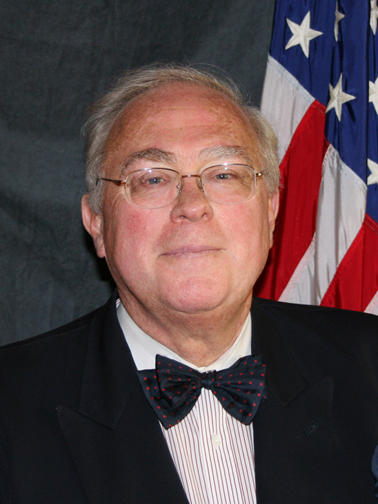
- Born: Kevin Owen Starr; September 3, 1940; San Francisco, California, U.S.
- Died: January 14, 2017 (aged 76); San Francisco, California, U.S.
- Education: University of San Francisco (B.A. 1962); Harvard (M.S. 1965; PhD 1969); U.C. Berkeley (M.S. 1974)
- Occupations: Historian; author; professor; librarian
- Known for: Writings on California history
- Spouse: Sheila Gordon (1963–his death)
- Children: 2
- Awards: California Hall of Fame; National Humanities Medal; Los Angeles Times Book Prize

Kevin Owen Starr (September 3, 1940 – January 14, 2017) was an American historian and California's state librarian, best known for his multi-volume series on the history of California, collectively called "Americans and the California Dream."

After an impoverished childhood, he received degrees from various universities where he studied history and literature. Beginning in 1973, Starr wrote nine books on the history of California during his career, along with being professor or visiting lecturer at numerous California universities. From 1989 until his death in 2017, he was a professor at the University of Southern California.

From 1994 to 2004 Starr was California's state librarian. He continued writing California history throughout his career, receiving a Guggenheim Fellowship, membership in the Society of American Historians, and the Gold Medal of the Commonwealth Club of California. In 2006 he was presented a National Humanities Medal from President George W. Bush for his work as a scholar and historian, and in 2010 was inducted into the California Hall of Fame.

== Early life and education ==
Kevin Starr was born on September 3, 1940, in San Francisco, to Owen Starr, a machinist, and Marian Starr (née Collins), a bank teller. He was a seventh generation Californian.

Starr's parents divorced when he was a child. When he was six his mother had a nervous breakdown, after which Starr and his younger brother, James, were placed in a Roman Catholic orphanage in Ukiah. Five years later, he and his brother were reunited with their mother, where they lived in a public housing project in San Francisco, while they subsisted on welfare. He attended St. Boniface School in the Tenderloin neighborhood.

He later enrolled in the University of San Francisco, a Jesuit institution, where he graduated with a Bachelor of Arts degree in English in 1962. At the school, he was editor of The Foghorn, the school newspaper. After graduation he was commissioned as an armor officer in the United States Army. He served for two years as a lieutenant with the 4th Battalion, 68th Armor Regiment, first as a platoon leader and then as the Assistant S-1. The 4/68 Armor Bn was assigned to the 3rd Brigade, 8th Infantry Division and was located at Coleman Barracks near Mannheim in West Germany. Upon release from the service, Starr entered Harvard University, earning an M.A. in English in 1965 and a Ph.D. in the discipline (specializing in American literature) in 1969. He subsequently launched his teaching career at Harvard as an assistant (and later associate) professor of English from 1969 to 1973 before returning to California.

== Career ==
In 1973, he became an aide and speechwriter to San Francisco mayor Joseph Alioto. He was also appointed city librarian, during which time he earned a master's degree in library science from the University of California, Berkeley, in 1974. He also did post-doctoral work at the Graduate Theological Union in Berkeley.

From 1976 to 1983, Starr wrote a column for the San Francisco Examiner. In one column, he described himself as “a conservative neo-Thomist Roman Catholic with Platonist leanings and occasional temptations towards anarchy.” He opposed what he called San Francisco's "rigid inquisitorial orthodoxy," which he identified with the city's Democratic leadership, and defended Proposition 13, which capped increases in property tax rates. After Patricia Hearst was abducted by the Symbionese Liberation Army, denounced her parents, and participated in the SLA's bank robberies, Starr described Hearst, whose father was president of the San Francisco Examiner, as "a political prisoner of the politics of class resentment." In one speech, San Francisco supervisor Harvey Milk referred to Starr as a bigot and grouped him with anti-gay activists. After leaving the Examiner and running unsuccessfully for the San Francisco Board of Supervisors, Starr tempered his political views and refashioned his public persona.

Beginning in 1973, Starr wrote nine books on the history of California, eight of which comprise his Americans and the California Dream series. It was at Harvard that he first became inspired to write about California's history, after browsing through their collection of books about California and the Pacific Coast. He explained the impact those books had on him:

All of a sudden I saw all these California books: diaries, memoirs, journals, histories, bibliographies. And a kind of enchantment overtook me, a kind of beguilement, a kind of reverie, definitely a physical reaction in the days that followed. As I look back on it psychologically, I see that I’d made an absolutely powerful connection between California and my interior landscape.

From 1974 to 1989 he was professor or visiting lecturer at numerous California universities, including UC Berkeley, University of Southern California, UC Davis, UC Riverside, Santa Clara University, the University of San Francisco, and Stanford University. He was also a columnist for the San Francisco Examiner and served as the Vatican correspondent for Hearst Newspapers, covering the elections of Popes John Paul I and John Paul II in 1978.

Kevin Starr chronicled the history of California as no one else. He captured the spirit of our state and brought to life the characters and personalities that made the California story. His vision, like California itself, was bigger than life.

— Governor Jerry Brown

In 1989 Starr became Professor of Urban and Regional Planning at the University of Southern California, he then became Professor of History, and he was designated University Professor in 1998. Starr sometimes taught at the USC State Capital Center in Sacramento, California.

Starr was appointed by Governor Pete Wilson to serve as California's state librarian, a post he managed from 1994 to 2004, at which time Governor Arnold Schwarzenegger named him State Librarian Emeritus. Starr oversaw the allocation of $350 million in local library construction money after voters approved a statewide library borrowing measure in 2000. As a child, Starr had to read the newspaper to his visually impaired father, an experience which led him to create a statewide service that allowed visually impaired people to call a phone number to connect with someone who would read the news to them.

California state librarian Greg Lucas calls Starr "truly, one of a kind. No other historian has been able to capture California's exceptionalism, its vitality and its promise in such detail and yet invest it with the immediacy and excitement of a page-turner novel." Starr's library assistant, Mattie Taormina, notes that "Starr made you excited to be a Californian because you were going to create the future California."

Mike Davis writes that Starr, in his Material Dreams, "by convincing us that its 'heroes' designed the city's past, offers a hubristic coda for today's mercenary intellectuals to claim that they are designing its future." Davis also criticizes the epilogue written by Starr for the Mayor Bradley-commissioned report LA 2000: A City for the Future (1988), where Davis draws attention to Starr's statement that Los Angeles in the 1920s found "community on a civic level" due to its having "a dominant establishment and a dominant population."

Starr is the author of the multi-volume history of California collectively entitled "Americans and the California Dream". The first volume in the series, Americans and the California Dream, 1850–1915 was published in 1973. The final volume, entitled Golden Dreams: California in an Age of Abundance, covers the period from 1950 to 1963 and won the 2009 Los Angeles Times Book Prize for history.

== Awards and honors ==
His writing won him a Guggenheim Fellowship, membership in the Society of American Historians, and the Gold Medal of the Commonwealth Club of California.

In 2006, Starr was made a member of the College of Fellows of the Dominican School of Philosophy and Theology in Berkeley, California. In 2006 he was presented a National Humanities Medal from President George W. Bush for his work as a scholar and historian. And in 2010, Governor Arnold Schwarzenegger and Maria Shriver inducted Starr into the California Hall of Fame.

Composer John Adams was inspired by the "Dream" series of books to write the piece City Noir in 2009. Starr received The Robert Kirsch Award by the Los Angeles Times as part of the 2012 Los Angeles Times Book Prizes.

== Death ==
Starr died of a heart attack in San Francisco on January 14, 2017.

== Works ==
- Land's End (a novel) (1979) ISBN 0-07-060880-6
- Americans and the California Dream, 1850–1915. (1973 and 1986) New York, NY: Oxford University Press. pp. 494. ISBN 978-0195016444 (1986) OCLC 641725018, 254930084
- Inventing the Dream: California through the Progressive Era (1985) ISBN 0-19-503489-9
- Material Dreams: Southern California through the 1920s (1990) ISBN 0-19-504487-8
- Endangered Dreams: The Great Depression in California (1996) ISBN 0-19-510080-8
- The Dream Endures: California Enters the 1940s (1997) ISBN 0-19-510079-4
- "Sunset Magazine and the Phenomenon of the Far West". Sunset magazine: a century of Western living, 1898–1998. Stanford University Libraries. 1998. ISBN 978-0-911221-17-6.
- Embattled Dreams: California in War and Peace, 1940–1950 (2002) ISBN 0-19-512437-5
- Coast Of Dreams: California on the Edge, 1990–2003 (2004) ISBN 0-679-41288-3
- California: a history. Random House. 2005. ISBN 978-0-679-64240-4.
- Golden dreams: California in an age of abundance, 1950–1963. Oxford University Press US. July 2009. ISBN 978-0-19-515377-4.
- Golden Gate: The Life and Times of America's Greatest Bridge. Bloomsbury USA. 24 April 2012. ISBN 9781596915343.
- Continental Ambitions: Roman Catholics in North America: the Colonial Experience. (2016) Ignatius Press; Sewn edition. pp. 675. ISBN 978-1621641186

== See also ==
- Bibliography of California history
