= Saint Francis of Assisi Church (San Francisco) =

Church in San Francisco, California, US

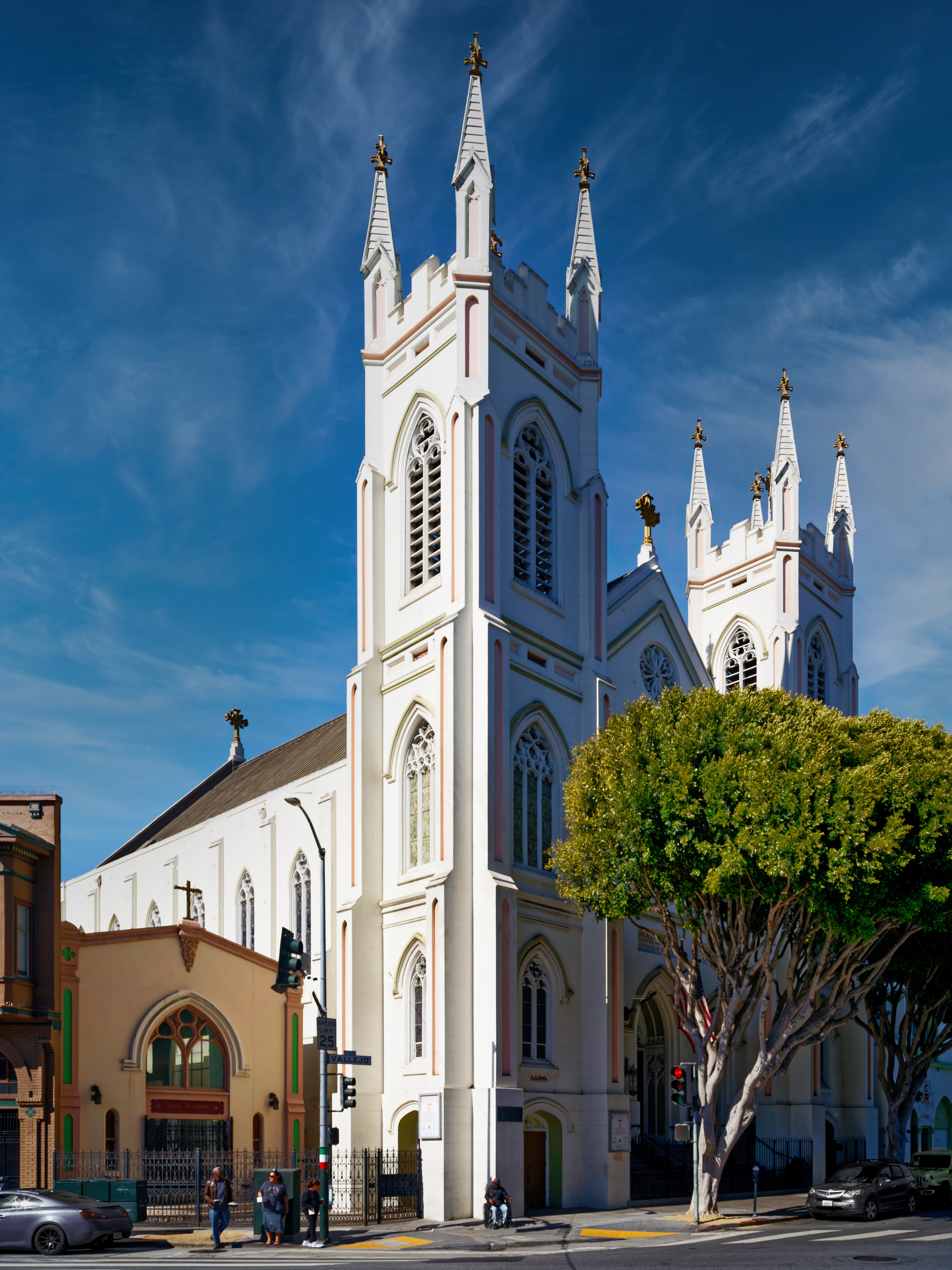

Religion
- Affiliation: Roman Catholic
- Ecclesiastical or organisational status: Archdiocese of San Francisco
- Leadership: Downtown Deanery

Location
- Location: 610 Vallejo Street, San Francisco, California, United States
- Interactive map of Saint Francis of Assisi Church
- Coordinates: 37.7988°N 122.4077°W

Architecture
- Style: Norman Revival, Gothic Revival
- San Francisco Designated Landmark
- Designated: September 3, 1968
- Reference no.: 5
- California Historical Landmark
- Designated: October 1, 1972

Website
- shrinesf.org

Saint Francis of Assisi Church is a historic Norman Gothic Catholic church building in the North Beach neighborhood of San Francisco, California, United States. Its an early church in California, outside of the Spanish missions. It is also known as the St. Francis Parish, and the National Shrine of St. Francis of Assisi.

It has been listed as a San Francisco Designated Landmark (no. 5) since September 3, 1968. On October 1, 1972, the building was declared to be a landmark by the California Historical Society; and in September 1999, it became known as the National Shrine of St. Francis of Assisi. It is a Pro-cathedral of the Roman Catholic Archdiocese of San Francisco.

== History ==
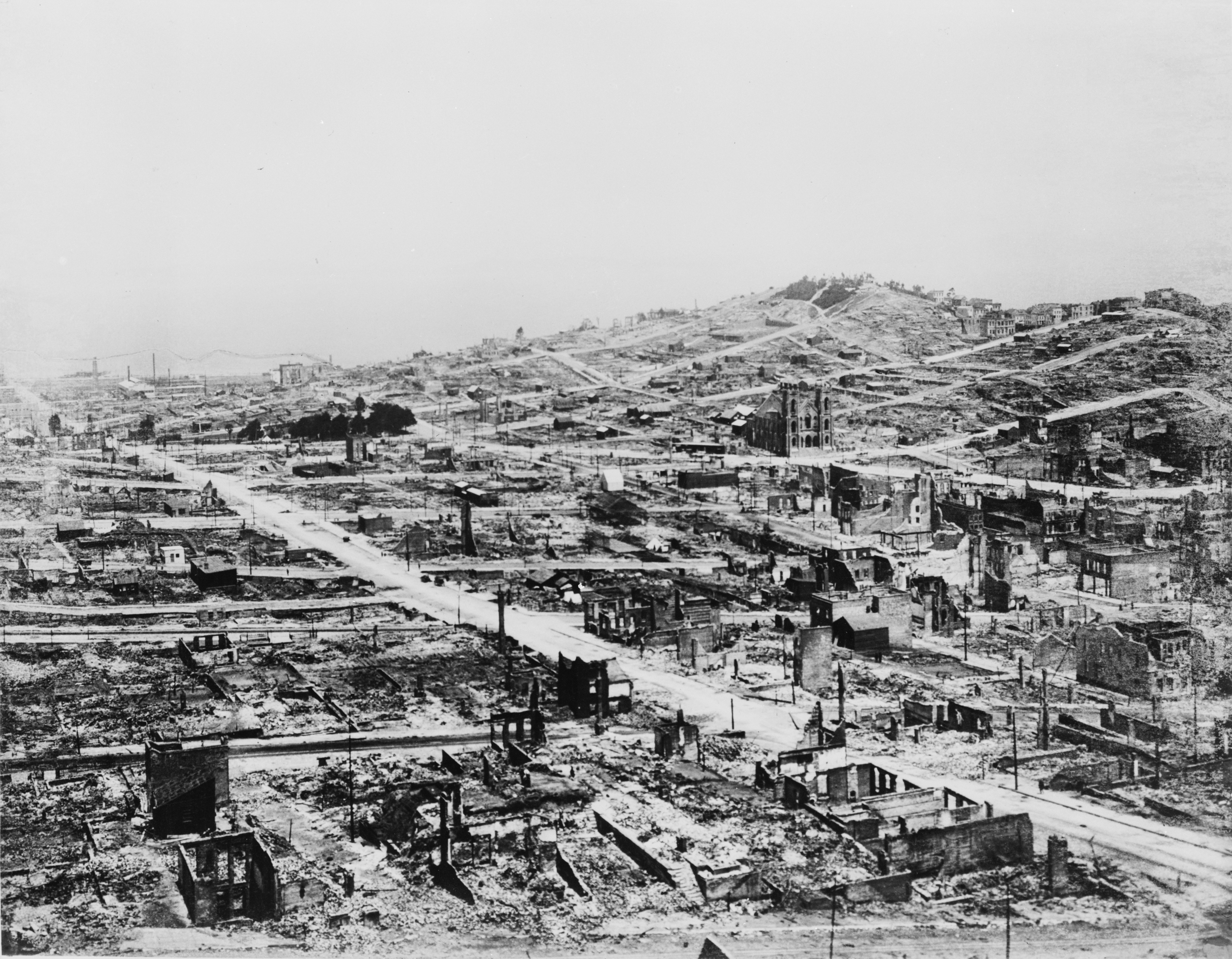
Historic view (1906, after the earthquake and fire) looking North at Saint Francis of Assisi Church

The Saint Francis of Assisi Church was dedicated as a parish church on March 17, 1860, and during the 1906 earthquake and fire the interior was fully damaged. Throughout its parish history, nineteen priests served as pastors. Early sermons were offered in many languages to reflect the community during the California gold rush, including in Latin, Spanish, Italian, French, Chinese, and German. Using the existing exterior walls which included the twin campanile, a new church interior was built and rededicated on March 2, 1919. It contains a 1926 pipe organ from the Schoenstein Organ Company of San Francisco, which was enlarged in 1993.

During the Beat movement in the 1950s, this church was an influential landmark in part due it is proximity to Caffe Trieste. Gregory Corso notably used this church's steps to perform poetry.

=== 21st century ===
The Saint Francis of Assisi Church was closed for many years due to seismic issues. In 2013, accusations of embezzlement and sexual harassment by former church chairman William McLaughlin had kept the church closed.

Politician and attorney, Angela Alioto was involved in a legal battle in 2013 over the La Porziuncola Nuova, a little chapel and shrine located next to the Saint Francis of Assisi Church in San Francisco, a 2008 replica of a small chapel founded in the 12th century by Saint Francis in Assisi, Italy. Alioto also founded the Knights of St. Francis organization, whose mission was to guard the La Porziuncola Nuova chapel.

== See also ==
- List of San Francisco Designated Landmarks
- San Francisco County Parishes
- Saints Peter and Paul Church, San Francisco, a church located nearby
