= Stella Roman =

Romanian soprano

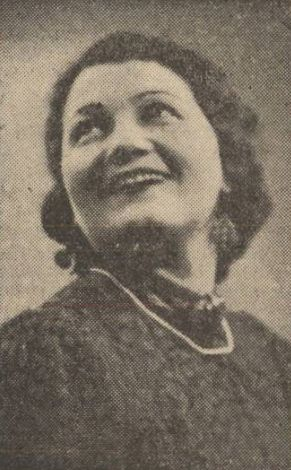
Image of Stella Roman

Stella Roman (23 August 1904 – 12 February 1992) was a Romanian operatic soprano whose career brought her leading roles in Italy and the United States.

== Background and training ==
Stella Roman (née Florica Viorica Alma Stela Blasu) was born in 1904 in Kolozsvár, Austria-Hungary (now Cluj-Napoca, Romania). She came from a musical background, and studied singing for eight years before making her concert début in Cluj and then in Bucharest. She then won a scholarship to continue her training in Italy with the great verismo interpreter Giuseppina Baldassare-Tedeschi, of whom she later said: "her style did not really suit me". Roman moved on to study with Hariclea Darclée (who had created the title role of Tosca at the première in 1900), and was much happier under her guidance: "she taught me the value of every word and phrase".

== Career ==
Her operatic début was, by her own account, at Bologna in 1934 in the role of Maddalena in Andrea Chénier, (though other accounts mention a performance in Piacenza in 1932). She sang Tosca at the Teatro di San Carlo in Naples which inaugurated a long partnership with the tenor Giacomo Lauri-Volpi. In 1937 she was offered a three-year contract at Rome Opera House by Tullio Serafin, and she found herself making a sudden début as Aida.

It was as Aida that she also made her first appearance at the Metropolitan Opera in New York in 1941, and she continued to sing there throughout the 1940s in the Italian repertoire: Il trovatore, Otello, Un ballo in maschera, Cavalleria rusticana, La Gioconda, Tosca. She often shared these roles at the Met with Zinka Milanov. She left the Met in 1950 after the arrival of Rudolf Bing as its general manager.

Stella Roman had a particular association with Richard Strauss, who chose her to sing the role of the Empress in Die Frau ohne Schatten for its Italian première at La Scala in 1940. She later went to visit Strauss at Pontresina in 1948 to study with him the Four Last Songs and the role of the Marschallin in Der Rosenkavalier, and it was as the Marschallin that she ended her career at the San Carlo Theatre in Naples. She retired in 1953 after having married for the second time; her operatic career had lasted for 19 years.

Her voice was admired for its warm lyrical quality and its ability to deliver high pianissimi and vibrant climaxes, but her technique was said to be "unorthodox and sometimes hectic".

After her retirement, she took up painting and her work was exhibited. She died of respiratory failure at Mount Sinai Hospital in New York at the age of 87.

== Recordings ==
Several of Roman's performance at the Metropolitan Opera were recorded and have now been reissued on CD, including:

- Un ballo in maschera, as Amelia, conducted by Ettore Panizza. February 1942.
- La forza del destino, as Leonora, conducted by Bruno Walter. January 1943. (Of this performance, Alan Blyth has written: "Stella Roman ... yields few points to such notable interpreters as Ponselle, Milanov and Tebaldi ... she uses her warm generous voice to unerring effect".)
- Otello, as Desdemona, with Torsten Ralf, conducted by George Szell. 1946.

In addition, a recording of assorted opera arias with Artur Rodziński conducting the Los Angeles Philharmonic, along with excerpts from Verdi's Aida with Karl Kritz conducting (1945–50), was released on Eklipse in 1997.

Roman also reported that she had made some recordings of Romanian folk-songs with her compatriot George Enescu, but it is not certain whether these were ever released. She also recorded as a soloist in Beethoven's 9th Symphony with the Philadelphia Orchestra conducted by Eugene Ormandy in May 1945. (Columbia Masterworks set mm-591)
