= Triathlon (concerto) =

Triathlon for Saxophonist and Orchestra is a saxophone concerto written in 2020 by the American composer John Corigliano. The work was commissioned by the San Francisco Symphony with support from Michèle and Larry Corash, to whom the piece is dedicated. Its world premiere, initially delayed by the COVID-19 pandemic, was given by the saxophonist Timothy McAllister and the San Francisco Symphony conducted by Giancarlo Guerrero at the Louise M. Davies Symphony Hall on April 7, 2022.

== Composition ==
=== Structure ===
Triathlon has a duration of roughly 30 minutes and is cast in three movements that each call for a different instrument in the saxophone family:

1. Leaps (soprano saxophone)
2. Lines (alto saxophone)
3. Licks (baritone saxophone)

The movement titles correspond to different facets of the music. "Leaps" refers to wide intervals of the opening theme. In the score program note, Corigliano wrote, "This melody utilizes the entire lyrical range of the soprano saxophone, and leads to a slower section that extends and develops the melody. But the joyous opening returns and the movement ends as it began — with a leap." The title of the second movement "Lines" refers the horizontal motion of its melody. The final movement "Licks" is named for the eponymous musical term, which refers to small improvisational moments in jazz. The composer added, "While this is not a jazz movement, the idea of small ornamental turns appealed to me, and provided me with the inspiration for the solo writing."

=== Instrumentation ===
The concerto is scored for a solo saxophonist (playing soprano, alto, and baritone saxophone) and an orchestra comprising two flutes (2nd doubling piccolo), two oboes (2nd doubling Cor anglais), two clarinets ( 2nd doubling bass clarinet), two bassoons (2nd doubling contrabassoon), four horns, three trumpets, two trombones, bass trombone, tuba, timpani, three percussionists, piano, and strings.

== Reception ==
Reviewing the world premiere, the music critic Joshua Kosman of the San Francisco Chronicle praised Triathlon, writing, "As the title suggests, it's a workout." He continued, "Corigliano’s 30-minute extravaganza, which the [San Francisco] Symphony had originally commissioned for a 2020 premiere that was delayed by the COVID pandemic, was the highlight of Thursday's matinee program. It grabbed a listener's attention from the first notes, and lingered long in the memory after everything else had passed."

== See also ==
- List of compositions by John Corigliano
