= Kenneth Fuchs =

American composer (born 1956)

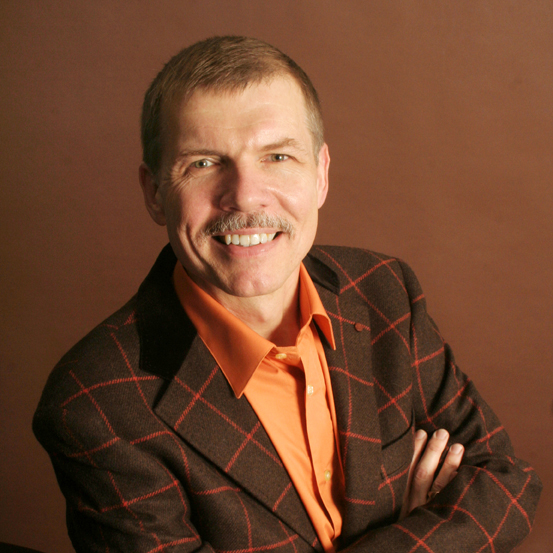

Background information
- Born: July 1, 1956 (age 70); USA
- Genres: Classical
- Occupations: Composer, Educator
- Label: Naxos
- Website: www.kennethfuchs.com

Kenneth Daniel Fuchs (born July 1, 1956) is a Grammy Award-winning American composer. He currently serves as Professor of Music Composition at the University of Connecticut in Storrs, Connecticut.

== Music ==
Kenneth Fuchs is the first living American composer recorded by the Sinfonia of London and its conductor, John Wilson (conductor). In June 2024, Chandos Records released Light Year, Orchestral Works, Volume 2, which includes two works for full orchestra and two concerti, one for alto saxophone performed by Timothy McAllister and the other for bass trombone performed by James Buckle. In July 2023, Chandos Records released Cloud Slant, Orchestral Works, Volume 1, which includes two works for full orchestra, a composition for strings, and a concerto for C and alto flute, performed by Adam Walker (flautist).

Fuchs recorded for Naxos five albums with the London Symphony Orchestra conducted by JoAnn Falletta, the last of which won the 2019 Grammy Award in the category Best Classical Compendium. The Recording Academy announced the accolade in the Classical category at the 61st annual awards ceremony at the Staples Center in Los Angeles, February 10, 2019.

Fuchs has composed music for orchestra, band, voice, chorus, and various chamber ensembles. With Pulitzer Prize-winning playwright Lanford Wilson, he created three chamber musicals:The Great Nebula in Orion, A Betrothal, and Brontosaurus, which were originally presented by Circle Repertory Company in New York City. Fuchs's operatic monodrama Falling Man (text by Don DeLillo, adapted by J. D. McClatchy) was presented at the National September 11 Memorial & Museum in commemoration of the 15th anniversary of 9/11. His music has achieved significant global recognition through performances, media exposure, and digital streaming and downloading throughout North and South America, Central and Eastern Europe, Asia, and Australia.

The London Symphony Orchestra, under the baton of JoAnn Falletta, has recorded five albums of Fuchs's music for Naxos American Classics. The first, released in August 2005, was nominated for two Grammy Awards (Best Instrumental Soloist(s) Performance (with orchestra) (Thomas Stacy, English horn, JoAnn Falletta, conductor) and Producer of the Year, Classical (Michael Fine)). The second album, which features music for horn, was released in January 2008. Following its release, MusicWeb-International stated, "Fuchs's distinctive voice is evident from the outset, and his flair for orchestral colours and sheer lyricism shine through". The third album, recorded in August 2011 at London's Abbey Road Studios, was released in August 2012. Following its release, BBC Music Magazine stated, "Kenneth Fuchs writes tonal orchestral music of great imagination. He's a master of orchestral writing." This album was included in the 2012 Grammy Award nominations for the category Producer of the Year, Classical (Tim Handley). The fourth album, recorded at Abbey Road Studios in August 2013, featuring a program of vocal music based on texts by Don DeLillo, John Updike, and William Blake, was released in August 2014. Gramophone Magazine featured the disc in its Awards Issue (October 2014), stating, "Fuchs claims his own expressive warmth and colour.... The performances are exemplary, from baritone Roderick Williams's commanding artistry to the bold, fresh playing of the London Symphony Orchestra under JoAnn Falletta's sensitive direction." The fifth album, recorded at Abbey Road Studios in August 2017, featuring a program of concerti for piano, electric guitar, alto saxophone, and an orchestral song cycle for countertenor based on twelve poems of Judith G. Wolf, was released in August 2018. James Jolley, Editor-in-Chief of Gramophone Magazine stated, "The American composer Kenneth Fuchs now has quite a sizeable discography of his music on Naxos, invariably played by the LSO who have played a major role in inspiring him to write for the orchestra with impressive authority and imagination." The album won the 2019 Grammy Award Award in the category Best Classical Compendium (JoAnn Falletta, conductor; Tim Handley, producer), announced by the Recording Academy at the 61st annual awards ceremony in Los Angeles, February 10, 2019.

Fuchs's seventh album for Naxos, released in August 2020, includes seven works for symphonic winds recorded by the United States Coast Guard Band and was called Point of Tranquility (Seven Works for Symphonic Winds).

Fuchs's album of chamber music was released by Naxos in April 2013 and includes Falling Canons (Christopher O'Riley, piano), Falling Trio (Trio21), and String Quartet No. 5 "American" (Delray String Quartet). The album received outstanding reviews in print and in online sources, including Fanfare Magazine, Gramophone Magazine, and MusicWeb-International.

Fuchs's recent orchestral commissions include Piano Concerto 'Spiritualist' (After Three Paintings by Helen Frankenthaler, Poems of Life (After Twelve Poems by Judith G. Wolf for Countertenor, violoncello, and Orchestra), Glacier (Concerto for Electric Guitar), Bass Trombone Concerto (scored for both orchestra and band), and Rush (Concerto for Alto Saxophone (scored for both orchestra and band). In 2013, the Wheeling Symphony Orchestra invited Fuchs to compose a fanfare-overture, Forever Free, to celebrate the Sesquicentennial of the State of West Virginia. Fuchs created a version of the work for band, which was performed by ensembles throughout the State to celebrate the occasion.

In 2012, the United States Air Force Band of Flight (Wright-Patterson Air Force Base, Ohio) commissioned Fuchs's celebration fanfare for brass and percussion From the Field to the Sky. The work, dedicated to the National Museum of the United States Air Force, was premiered under the baton of Lieutenant Daniel W. Boothe on November 3, 2012. In 2008, the United States Air Force Academy Band (Peterson Air Force Base, Colorado) commissioned Fuchs's work for band United Artists. Following performances on tour throughout the U.S., the band recorded the work under the baton of Colonel Larry H. Lang for inclusion on the disc Windscapes, which was released in December 2009. The work was simultaneously published and released by the Hal Leonard Corporation, the world's largest music print publisher. Since its release the work has been played by high school and college bands throughout the United States and in China. Subsequently, Hal Leonard published two other works scored for band, Discover the Wild and Forever Free.

The Adrian Symphony Orchestra in Michigan appointed Fuchs as composer in residence for the 2009–10 seasons. In collaboration with music director John Thomas Dodson, the residency included world premiere performances of five works. The residency concluded with the premiere of Divinum Mysterium (concerto for viola and orchestra) on April 10, 2010. The concerto was composed especially for London Symphony Orchestra principal Paul Silverthorne, who performed the premiere in Adrian. Silverthorne recorded the work with the LSO for Fuchs's third Naxos disc on August 19, 2011.

Marin Alsop selected Fuchs as one of ten composers in residence for the Cabrillo Festival of Contemporary Music in August 2007. Alsop conducted the world premiere of the original orchestral version of Fuchs's work United Artists, following which critic Jason Victor Serinus wrote in the American Record Guide, "the work's dramatic, resounding chords and gloriously ringing flourishes constitute a modern fanfare of sorts."

The album Kenneth Fuchs: String Quartets 2, 3, 4 performed by the American String Quartet was released by Albany Records in 2001. Following the release of this disc, the American Record Guide stated quite simply, "String quartet recordings don't get much better than this."

Fuchs received his Bachelor of Music degree (1979) in composition from the University of Miami where he graduated Omicron Delta Kappa. He earned a Master of Music (1983) and Doctor of Musical Arts (1988) degrees from the Juilliard School in New York City. His teachers included Milton Babbitt, David Diamond, Vincent Persichetti, David Del Tredici, Alfred Reed and Stanley Wolfe. The University of Miami Frost School of Music named him Distinguished Alumnus for the Year 2000. The University of Miami Band of the Hour Association inducted him into their Hall of Fame in 2008. Phi Mu Alpha Sinfonia, the national music fraternity, named Fuchs a Signature Sinfonian in 2009. The designation "recognizes alumni members who have achieved a high standard of accomplishment in their field or profession, thereby bringing honor to Phi Mu Alpha Sinfonia Fraternity."

Fuchs has also been deeply committed to arts administration. He served as head of the department of music at the University of Connecticut from 2005 to 2008. Prior to this, he served as director of the school of music at the University of Oklahoma from 1998 to 2005. Previous administrative positions include dean of students and academics at the Manhattan School of Music (1990–1998), assistant dean of the school of music at the North Carolina School of the Arts (1988–1989), and assistant to the associate dean at the Juilliard School (1985–1988). Fuchs served as a member of the Commission on Accreditation for the National Association of Schools of Music (2003–2009), evaluating music curricula at collegiate institutions throughout the United States. He served as an on-site evaluator to such institutions as the Cleveland Institute of Music, Curtis Institute of Music, Peabody Institute of the Johns Hopkins University, Arizona State University, University of Nebraska-Lincoln, and the University of Washington.

Fuchs has composed scores for orchestra, band, solo instruments, voice, chorus, standard and mixed chamber ensembles, and musical theater. His music is published by Bill Holab Music, Edward B. Marks Music Company (an imprint of Round Hill Music) represented by Keiser Southern Music, Hal Leonard Corporation, Theodore Presser Company, and Subito Music.

Fuchs has been awarded artist residencies at the Atlantic Center for the Arts (New Smyrna Beach, Florida); The Hermitage (Manisota Key, Florida); The MacDowell Colony (Peterborough, New Hampshire); The Helene Wurlitzer Foundation of New Mexico (Taos); and Yaddo (Saratoga Springs, New York). His professional memberships include ASCAP (American Society of Composers, Authors, and Publishers); American Composers Forum; College Music Society; Dramatists Guild; National Association of Schools of Music, and The Recording Academy.

== Discography ==
Recordings of Fuchs's music include:

- Light Year (Orchestral Works, Volume 2); Sinfonia of London conducted by John Wilson (conductor) with soloists James Buckle, bass trombone, and Timothy McAllister, saxophone. (Chandos Records 5326), 2024. Brian Pidgeon, Producer, and Kenneth Fuchs, Executive Producer.
- Cloud Slant (Orchestral Works, Volume 1); Sinfonia of London conducted by John Wilson (conductor) with soloist Adam Walker. (Chandos Records 5296), 2023. Nominated for the 2023 Grammy Award in the category Producer of the Year, Classical (Brian Pidgeon, Producer, and Kenneth Fuchs, Executive Producer).
- Point of Tranquility (Seven Works for Symphonic Winds); United States Coast Guard Band conducted by Adam Williamson; (Naxos Records 8.573567), 2020.
- Piano Concerto Spiritualist (After Three Paintings by Helen Frankenthaler); Poems of Life (Twelve Poems by Judith G. Wolf for Countertenor and Orchestra); Glacier (Concerto for Electric Guitar and Orchestra); Rush (Concerto for Saxophone and Orchestra). London Symphony Orchestra conducted by JoAnn Falletta with soloists D. J. Sparr, electric guitar; Jeffrey Biegel, piano; Aryeh Nussbaum Cohen, countertenor; and Timothy McAllister, saxophone. (Naxos Records 8.559824), 2018. WINNER of the 2019 Grammy Award in the category Best Classical Compendium (JoAnn Falletta, conductor; Tim Handley, producer).
- Orion Nocturne, including “Orion Nocturne,” completed 2005; Johanna Cox Pennington, oboe, Albany Records (Troy 1737), 2018.
- New Music for Violin and Piano, including “Duo for Violin and Piano,” 2013, Julie Rosenfeld, violin, Albany Records (Troy 1717), 2018.
- Falling Man (for Baritone Voice and Orchestra, text by Don DeLillo, adapted by J. D. McClatchy); Movie House (Seven Poems by John Updike for Baritone Voice and Chamber Ensemble); Songs of Innocence and of Experience (Four Poems by William Blake for Baritone Voice and Chamber Ensemble). London Symphony Orchestra conducted by JoAnn Falletta with soloist Roderick Williams, baritone. (Naxos Records 8.559753), 2014.
- String Quartet No. 5 ("American"; Falling Canons (Seven Canons for Piano); Falling Trio (for Piano, Violin, and Violoncello). Christopher O'Riley, piano; Trio21 (Jeffrey Biegel, Kinga Augustyn, Robert DeMaine); Delray String Quartet (Mei Mei Luo, Tomas Cotick, Richard Fleischman, Claudio Jaffé). (Naxos Records 8.559733), 2013.
- Atlantic Riband (for Orchestra); American Rhapsody (Romance for Violin and Orchestra); Concerto Grosso (for String Quartet and String Orchestra); Discover the Wild (for Orchestra); and Divinum Mysterium (Concerto for Viola and Orchestra). London Symphony Orchestra conducted by JoAnn Falletta with soloists Michael Ludwig, violin, and Paul Silverthorne, principal viola of the LSO. (Naxos Records 8.559723), 2012. Nominated for a 2012 Grammy Award in the category Producer of the Year, Classical (Tim Handley).
- Evensong (for Horn and Guitar), “Horn Constellation: Jacek Muzyk,” JoAnn Falletta, guitar; Summit Records (DCD-563), 2011.
- United Artists (Fanfare-Overture for Winds, Brass, and Percussion), "Windscapes", United States Air Force Academy Band, 2009.
- Canticle to the Sun (Concerto for French horn and orchestra); United Artists (for Orchestra); Quiet in the Land (Idyll for flute, clarinet, English horn, viola, and cello); Fire, Ice, and Summer Bronze (Idyll for Brass Quintet After Two Works on Paper by Helen Frankenthaler); and Autumn Rhythm (Idyll for Woodwind Quintet After a Painting by Jackson Pollock). London Symphony Orchestra conducted by JoAnn Falletta with soloist Timothy Jones, principal horn of the LSO. (Naxos Records 8.559335), 2008.
- On Silver Wings (Fanfare-Overture for Winds, Brass, and Percussion), "On Silver Wings", United States Air Force Band of Liberty, 2006.
- Immigrants Still (Poem by Richard Wilbur), "Songs of Liberation", CONCORA, 2006.
- An American Place (for Orchestra); Eventide (Concerto for English Horn, Harp, Percussion, and String Orchestra); Out of the Dark (Suite for Chamber Orchestra After Three Paintings by Helen Frankenthaler). London Symphony Orchestra conducted by JoAnn Falletta with soloists Thomas Stacy, English horn, and Timothy Jones, principal French horn of the LSO. (Naxos Records 8.559224), 2005. Nominated for two 2006 Grammy Awards in the categories Best Instrumental Soloist(s) Performance (with orchestra) (Thomas Stacy, English horn, and JoAnn Falletta for Eventide) and Producer of the Year, Classical (Michael Fine).
- String Quartets Nos. 2, 3 & 4, American String Quartet, Albany Records (Troy 480), 2001.
- Christina's World (Idyll for Winds, Brass, and Percussion After a Painting by Andrew Wyeth), "Christina's World", University of Miami Frost School of Music Wind Ensemble, Albany Records (Troy 403), 2000.
- In the Clearing (Eight Poems by Robert Frost), "In the Clearing", Coro Allegro (Boston), 1998.
- Face of the Night (After a Painting by Robert Motherwell), "New York Legends: Recitals with Principals from the New York Philharmonic," Thomas Stacy, English horn, Cala Records (CACD0511), 1997.

== Private life ==
Kenneth Fuchs resides in Mansfield Center, Connecticut. His life partner since 1980 is graphic designer Chris von Rosenvinge. They were married in Connecticut on April 28, 2009, the first day of their thirtieth year as a couple.
