= Gregory Wanamaker =

Gregory Wanamaker (born 1968) is an American composer, musician, and professor of music composition and theory.

== Education ==
He studied at Shenandoah University from 1987 to 1991, where he received a 2016 Distinguished Alumni Award for Professional Achievement, and Florida State University from 1991 to 1996. His composition instructors included Anthony Branker, William Averitt, Thomas Albert, and Ladislav Kubík.

== Life and career ==
Wanamaker was born in Livonia, Michigan, and spent most of his youth in Skaneateles, New York. He is currently Professor of Composition and Music Theory at the Crane School of Music at the State University of New York at Potsdam, where he has served since 1997. Wanamaker’s commissions include works for the Society for New Music, Timothy McAllister, Akropolis Reed Quintet, PRISM Quartet, Capitol Quartet, and independent consortiums of musicians.

== Works ==
Wanamaker is best known for his works that feature the saxophone as a solo instrument or as part of a chamber ensemble. His Sonata deus sax machina was premiered at the 12th World Saxophone Congress by Timothy McAllister and David Heinick in July 2000, and has served as one of the required works for the semi-final round of the Adolphe Sax International Competition for saxophonists. Wanamaker’s Duo Sonata for clarinet and alto saxophone, composed in 2002, has entered standard repertoire for this instrumentation. Saxophonist Timothy McAllister dubbed it “the cornerstone work for such a combination” in his 2010 interview for Fanfare Magazine. According to the composer, Duo Sonata has received over 300 performances to date.

Wanamaker collaborated with Garth Bardsley on several works for choir and orchestra including Adirondack Songs and Laude!

He owns a publishing company named Gregory Wanamaker Music (ASCAP).
