= List of churches in the Archdiocese of San Francisco =

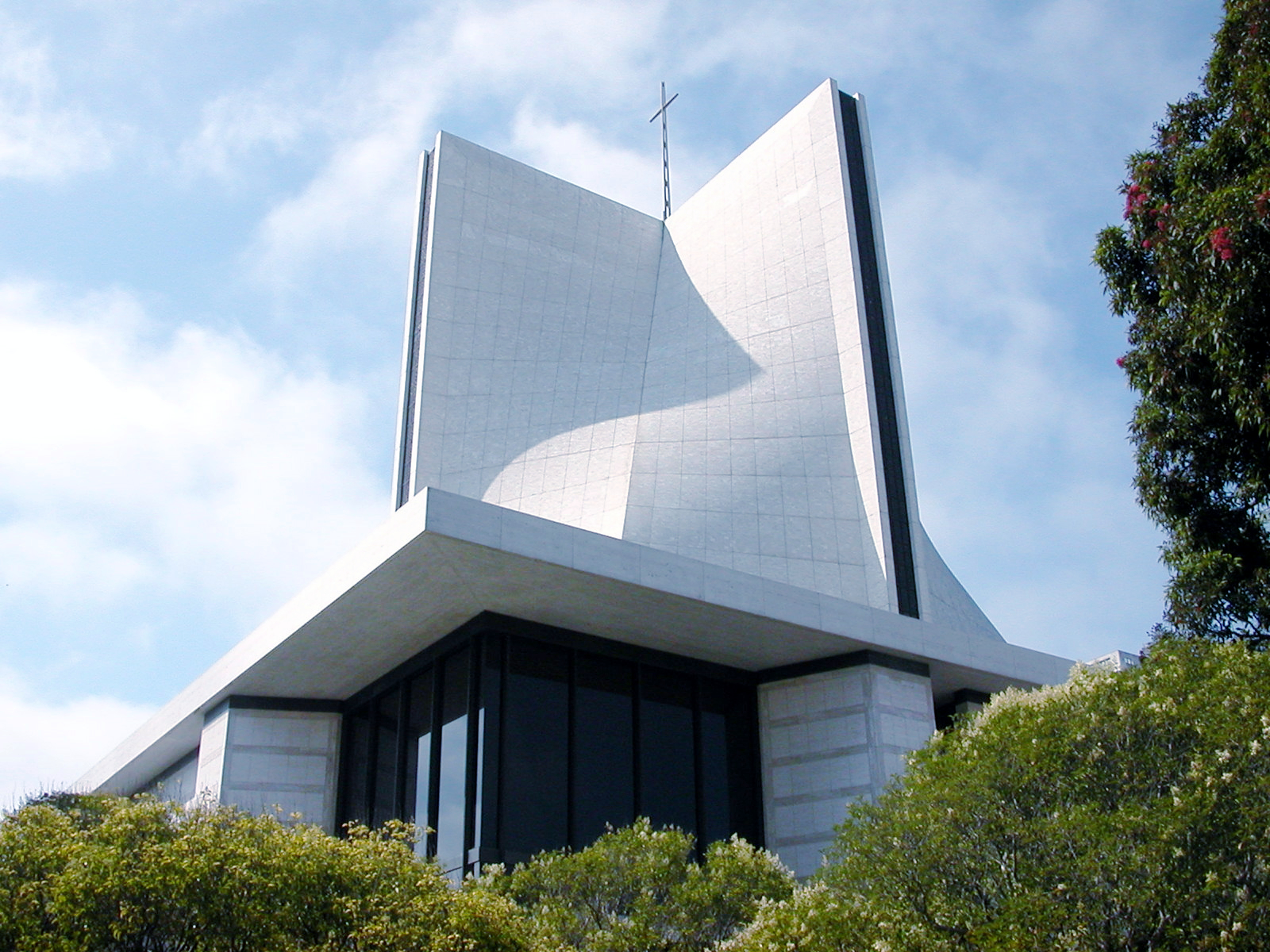
Cathedral of Saint Mary of the Assumption, completed in 1971

This is a list of current and former Roman Catholic churches in the Roman Catholic Archdiocese of San Francisco. The archdiocese includes the City and County of San Francisco and the Counties of Marin and San Mateo.

The mother church of the archdiocese is the Cathedral of Saint Mary of the Assumption in San Francisco, completed in 1971. It replaced the previous cathedral, dedicated in 1891 at the NW corner of Van Ness Avenue and O'Farrell Street, which was destroyed by arson in 1962. The archdiocese includes the following historic sites

- Old Saint Mary's Cathedral in San Francisco, dating to the mid-1850s, still in active use as a parish church
- Mission San Francisco de Asís, the oldest building in San Francisco
- Saints Peter and Paul Church in San Francisco, known as the Italian cathedral of the West

== San Francisco County ==
All the parishes in San Francisco County are contained in five deaneries.

=== Alemany Deanery ===
The Alemany Deanery consists of the Bayview/Hunter's Point, Excelsior, Visitacion Valley, Crocker Amazon and Ingleside areas in San Francisco.

Church name	Image	Location	Date est.	Description/notes
Church of the Epiphany		827 Vienna St.	1911	Current church completed in 1950
Church of the Visitacion		655 Sunnydale Ave.	1907	Current church dedicated in 1952
Corpus Christi		62 Santa Rosa Ave.	1898	A Salesian parish
Our Lady of Lourdes		410 Hawes St.	1946	Wooden chapel with carved beams and stained glass windows depicting Dr. Martin Luther King, Jr., Sojourner Truth and others
St. Elizabeth		459 Somerset St.	1912	
St. Emydius		286 Ashton Ave.	1913	
St. Michael Korean		32 Broad St.	1898	
St. Paul of the Shipwreck		1122 Jamestown Ave.	1913	Located in Bayview Hunters Point neighborhood

=== Cathedral Deanery ===
The Cathedral Deanery consists of the Western Addition, Japantown, Castro, Haight-Ashbury, Richmond, and Cow Hollow neighborhoods in San Francisco.

Church name	Image	Location	Date est.	Description/notes
Cathedral of Saint Mary of the Assumption		1111 Gough St.		
Nativity of Our Lord		240 Fell St.	1903	Began as a parish serving Croatian and Slovenian immigrants
Most Holy Redeemer		100 Diamond St.	1900	Church dedicated in 1901; located in the Castro district
Our Lady of Fatima		5920 Geary Blvd.	1950	Russian Byzantine parish founded to serve Russian exiles
St. Agnes		1025 Masonic Ave.	1893	Addition to church built in 1953
St. Benedict Parish for the Deaf		1801 Octavia St.	1984	Established as the only deaf Catholic parish in the Western United States
St. Dominic		2390 Bush St.	1873	Gothic style church completed in 1928; flying buttresses added in early 1990s for seismic stability
St. Ignatius		650 Parker Ave.	1855	Current Italian Renaissance and Baroque church dedicated in 1914
St. Monica-St. Thomas the Apostle Parish		St. Monica Church, 470 24th Ave.	1911	Current church dedicated in 1918. Merged in 2017 with St. Thomas the Apostle.
		St. Thomas the Apostle Church, 3835 Balboa St.		First church built in 1923, expanded in 1930. Merged in 2017 with St. Monica
St. Vincent de Paul		2320 Green St.	1911	Parish in Pacific Heights neighborhood. Church opened in 1913, became known as the "Church of the Exposition"
Star of the Sea		4420 Geary Blvd.		

=== Downtown Deanery ===
The Downtown Deanery consists of San Francisco's Financial District, Chinatown, North Beach, Tenderloin District, and SOMA areas.

Church name	Image	Location	Date est.	Description/notes
National Shrine of St. Francis of Assisi		610 Vallejo St.		Current Norman Gothic church has twin campaniles, was dedicated in 1860
Notre Dame des Victoires		566 Bush St.	1856	Founded to serve French immigrants. The original church was destroyed in the 1906 San Francisco Earthquake. The current church was built in 1913; it is a San Francisco Historic landmark
Old St. Mary's Cathedral		660 California St.	1854	Gothic Revival church built in 1854. It is a San Francisco landmark
St. Boniface		133 Golden Gate Ave.	1860	
St. Patrick		756 Mission St.	1851	Church rebuilt after 1906 San Francisco Earthquake. It is San Francisco Historic Landmark #4
Sts. Peter and Paul		666 Filbert St.	1884	Known as the Italian Cathedral of the West, completed in 1924

=== Mission Deanery ===
The Mission Deanery consists of the Mission, Bernal Heights, Glen Park, Potrero Hill, and Noe Valley districts in San Francisco.

Church name	Image	Location	Date est.	Description/notes
Mission Dolores Basilica and Mission San Francisco de Asis		3321 16th St.	1776	The mission building is the oldest surviving structure in San Francisco; the basilica was added in 1918
St. Anthony of Padua		3215 Cesar Chavez St.	1893	
St. Charles Borromeo		701 S Van Ness Ave.	1887	Current Mission style church built in 1917
St. James		1086 Guerrero St.	1888	
St. John the Evangelist		19 St Marys Ave.	1893	
St. Kevin		704 Cortland Ave.	1922	Church built in 1925
St. Paul		221 Valley St.	1876	Located in Noe Valley neighborhood, completed in 1911
St. Peter		1200 Florida St.	1867	
St. Philip the Apostle		725 Diamond St.	1910	Gothic Revival church built in 1925
St. Teresa of Avila		1490 19th St.	1880	Church built in 1892

=== Sunset Deanery ===
The Sunset Deanery consists of San Francisco's Sunset District, Forest Hill, Parkside, Westwood Park, and Lakeside neighborhoods.

Church name	Image	Location	Date est.	Description and notes
Holy Name of Jesus		1555 39th Ave.	1925	Located in the Sunset District. Church was dedicated in 1964. It was referred to at the time as being "as modern as tomorrow."
St. Anne of the Sunset		850 Judah St.	1904	Romanesque church in Sunset District was completed in 1932.
St. Brendan the Navigator		29 Rockaway Ave.	1929	California mission-style structure with a distinctive bell tower
St. Cecilia		2555 17th Ave.	1917	Current Spanish colonial church completed in 1956 in Sunset District
St. Finn Barr		415 Edna St.	1926	Located in the Sunnyside district
St. Gabriel		2559 40th Ave.	1941	Church dedicated in 1942
St. John of God		1290 5th Ave.	1967	
St. Stephen		451 Eucalyptus Dr.	1950	Church dedicated in 1964
St. Thomas More		1300 Junipero Serra Blvd.	1950	

== Marin County ==
=== Marin Deanery ===
The Marin Deanery consists of all the parishes in Marin County.

Church name	Image	Location	Date est.	Description/Notes
Church of the Assumption and St. Helen Parish		Tomales	1860	
Mission San Rafael Arcángel		1104 5th Ave, San Rafael	1822	Founded in 1817 as a medical asistencia ("sub-mission") of Mission San Francisco de Asís; granted full mission status in 1822.
Our Lady of Loretto		1806 Novato Blvd, Novato	1892	Church dedicated in 1963
Our Lady of Mount Carmel		3 Oakdale Ave, Mill Valley	1910	Church dedicated in 1968
Sacred Heart		10189 State Route #1, Olema	1937	Church dedicated in 1967
St. Anselm		97 Shady Lane and Bolinas, San Anselmo	1907	Church built in 1908
St. Anthony of Padua		1000 Cambridge St, Novato	1968	Church dedicated in 1971
St. Cecilia		450 Cintura Ave, Lagunitas	1937	
St. Hilary		761 Hilary Drive, Tiburon	1951	
St. Isabella		One Trinity Way, San Rafael	1961	
St. Mary Star of the Sea		180 Harrison Ave, Sausalito	1881	Church built in 1959
St. Mary's		Ranch Rd, Nicasio		Built in 1867, declared a historical monument by the Native Sons and Daughters of the Golden West in 1967; now a mission church of St. Cecilia's in Lagunitas
St. Mary Magdalene		16 Horseshoe Hill Rd, Bolinas	1863	Mission church of Sacred Heart in Olema; dates to 1878
St. Patrick		114 King St, Larkspur	1915	
St. Raphael		1104 Fifth Ave, San Rafael	1861	Parish traces its history to formation of the Mission San Rafael Arcángel in 1817.
St. Rita		100 Marinda Dr, Fairfax	1930	
St. Sebastian		373 Bon Air Rd, Greenbrae	1951	

== San Mateo County ==
All the parishes in San Mateo County are contained in four deaneries.

=== Central San Mateo Deanery ===
Church name	Image	Location	Date est.	Description/notes
Immaculate Heart of Mary		1040 Alameda De Las Pulgas, Belmont	1947	
Our Lady of Angels		1721 Hillside Dr, Burlingame	1926	Served by Capuchin Franciscans
Our Lady of the Pillar		400 Church St, Half Moon Bay	1868	Church dedicated in 1954, largest parish in size in San Mateo County.
St. Bartholomew		300 Alameda De Las Pulgas, San Mateo	1955	
St. Catherine of Siena		1310 Bayswater Ave, Burlingame	1908	
St. Gregory		2715 Hacienda St, San Mateo	1941	Church constructed in 1953.
St. Luke		1111 Beach Park Blvd, Foster City	1970	
St. Mark		325 Marine View Ave, Belmont	1965	Church built in 1970.
St. Matthew		1 Notre Dame Ave, San Mateo	1863	

=== Coastside Deanery ===
Church name	Image	Location	Date est.	Description/notes
Church of the Good Shepherd		901 Oceana Blvd, Pacifica	1951	
Holy Angels		107 San Pedro Rd, Colma	1914	
Our Lady of Mercy		1 Elmwood Dr, Daly City	1954	Church dedicated in 1956.
Our Lady of Perpetual Help		60 Wellington Ave, Daly City	1925	
St. Andrew		1571 Southgate Ave, Daly City	1968	Church dedicated in 1975.
St. Augustine		3700 Callan Blvd, South San Francisco	1970	Church dedicated in 1975.
St. Peter		700 Oddstad Blvd, Pacifica	1956	

=== North San Mateo Deanery ===
Church name	Image	Location	Date est.	Description/notes
All Souls		315 Walnut Ave, South San Francisco	1913	Church dedicated in 1968.
Mater Dolorosa		307 Willow Ave, South San Francisco	1961	
St. Bruno		555 W. San Bruno Ave, San Bruno	1912	Church dedicated in 1959.
St. Dunstan		1133 Broadway, Millbrae	1940	
St. Robert		1380 Crystal Springs Rd, San Bruno	1912	Church constructed in 1958.
St. Veronica		434 Alida Way, South San Francisco	1951	

=== South San Mateo Deanery ===
Church name	Image	Location	Date est.	Description/notes
Church of the Nativity		210 Oak Grove Ave, Menlo Park	1877	
Our Lady of Mount Carmel		300 Fulton St, Redwood City	1887	
Our Lady of the Wayside		930 Portola Rd, Portola Valley		Mission Revival church built in 1912
St. Anthony of Padua		3500 Middlefield Rd, Menlo Park	1951	
St. Charles		880 Tamarack Ave, San Carlos	1928	Church dedicated in 1966
St. Denis		2250 Avy Ave, Menlo Park	1856 and 1961	
St. Francis of Assisi		1425 Bay Rd, East Palo Alto	1951	
St. Matthias		1685 Cordilleras Rd, Redwood City	1961	Church dedicated in 1963.
St. Pius		1100 Woodside Rd, Redwood City	1951	Church dedicated in 1968.
St. Raymond		1100 Santa Cruz Ave, Menlo Park	1950	Church dedicated in 1959.
