= Kōmei Abe =

Japanese composer

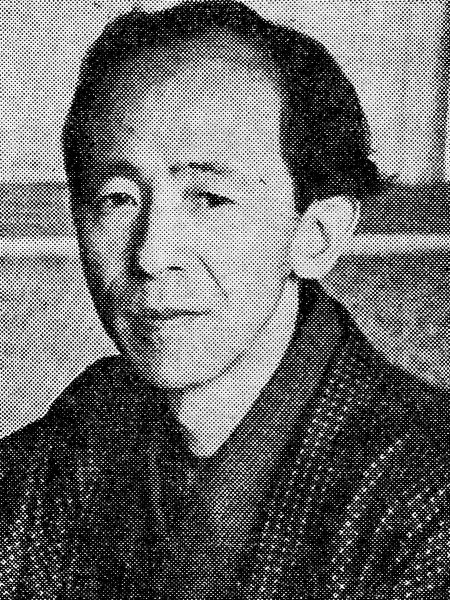
- Born: 1 September 1911; Hiroshima, Japan
- Died: 28 December 2006 (aged 95)
- Occupation: composer

Kōmei Abe (安部幸明, Abe Kōmei; 1 September 1911 – 28 December 2006) was a neo-classical Japanese composer who specialized in string quartets. He performed both as cellist and clarinetist.

== Biography ==
He was born in Hiroshima in a military family, and became interested in the violin during a stay in Tokyo. From 1929 he attended Tokyo Music School, where he studied cello under Heinrich Werkmeister (1883–1936), who had moved to Japan in 1907, and studied composition under the conductor Klaus Pringsheim Sr. (a former pupil of Gustav Mahler) who had been invited to Tokyo in 1931 to become a professor of music at the Tokyo National University of Fine Arts and Music. From 1937 he studied with Joseph Rosenstock. In 1942, he had his first success with the premiere of the Cello Concerto, which he had completed five years before. However, in 1944 he was conscripted into the Navy. After the war, he became involved in broadcasting and co-founded the five-member Chijinkai (Earth-Human Association), which gave six concerts between 1949 and 1955. Between 1948 and 1954, he was the director of the Imperial orchestra. Although this orchestra usually performed Western music, many of its members had played traditional court music and thus, Abe learnt in detail about the gagaku style.

His compositions include two symphonies, fifteen string quartets, and concertos for piano and cello.

== Selected works ==
=== Orchestral works ===
- 1935 Kleine Suite, for orchestra
- 1937 Concerto, for cello and orchestra
- 1953-1957 Symphony No. 1
  1. Allegro con brio
  2. Adagietto
  3. Vivace assai
- 1960 Divertimento, for alto saxophone and orchestra
  1. Andante sostenuto
  2. Adagietto
  3. Allegro
- 1960 Symphony No. 2
- 1964 Sinfonietta, for orchestra
  1. Allegro con brio
  2. Moderato
  3. Scherzo: Andante - Presto
  4. Finale: Allegro assai
- 1985 Piccola sinfonia for strings

=== Theatre ===
- Jungle Drum, ballet choreographed by Michio Ito (1893-1961)

=== Chamber music ===
- 1935 String quartet No. 1
- 1937 String quartet No. 2
- 1940 String quartet No. 3
- 1942 String quartet No. 4
- 1942 Sonata No. 1, for flute and piano
- 1946 Clarinet quintet
- 1948 String quartet No. 5
- 1948 String quartet No. 6
- 1950 String quartet No. 7
- 1951 Divertimento, for alto saxophone and piano
- 1952 String quartet No. 8
- 1956 String quartet No. 9
- 1978 String quartet No. 10
- 1982 String quartet No. 11
- 1988 String quartet No. 12
- 1989 String quartet No. 13
- 1991 String quartet No. 14
- 1993 String quartet No. 15

=== Music for children ===
- 1972 3 Sonatinas for children
- 1986 Easy piano pieces for children: "Dreamland"
