= Saxophone Concerto (Adams) =

Composition by John Adams

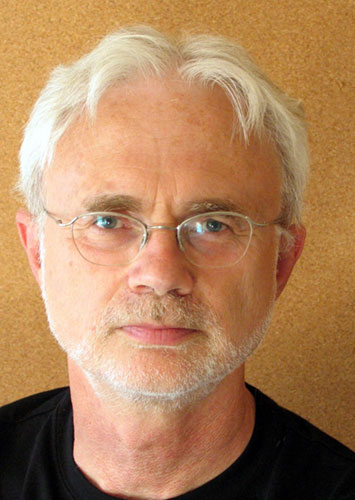
John Adams in 2008

The Saxophone Concerto is a composition for alto saxophone and orchestra by the American composer John Adams. The work was jointly commissioned by the Sydney Symphony Orchestra, the St. Louis Symphony, the Baltimore Symphony Orchestra, and Orquestra Sinfônica do Estado de São Paulo Foundation. It was given its world premiere in Sydney, Australia on August 22, 2013, by the saxophonist Timothy McAllister and Sydney Symphony Orchestra under the direction of Adams.

== Composition ==
=== Background ===
The Saxophone Concerto was Adams's first composition following his three-hour oratorio The Gospel According to the Other Mary. Adams, whose father played alto saxophone in swing bands during the 1930s, has cited his early exposure to such jazz saxophonists as John Coltrane, Eric Dolphy, and Wayne Shorter as inspiration for the piece. The composer described the work's style in the score program notes, writing, "While the concerto is not meant to sound jazzy per se, its jazz influences lie only slightly below the surface." Noting the relative scarcity of saxophone concertos in the classical repertoire, Adams further remarked:

A composer writing a violin or piano concerto can access a gigantic repository of past models for reference, inspiration or even cautionary models. But there are precious few worthy concertos for saxophone, and the extant ones did not especially speak to me. But I knew many great recordings from the jazz past that could form a basis for my compositional thinking, among them "Focus," a 1961 album by Stan Getz for tenor sax and an orchestra of harp and strings arranged by Eddie Sauter. Although clearly a "studio" creation, this album featured writing for the strings that referred to Stravinsky, Bartók and Ravel. Another album, "Charlie Parker and Strings," from 1950, although more conventional in format, nonetheless helped to set a scenario in my mind for way the alto sax could float and soar above an orchestra. Another album that I'd known since I was a teenager, "New Bottle Old Wine," with Canonball Adderley [sic] and that greatest of all jazz arrangers, Gil Evans, remained in mind throughout the composing of the new concerto as a model to aspire to.

Thus, Adams stipulated that the concerto be played in the jazz style of saxophone performance, as opposed to the classical "French" style of playing typically heard in such pieces as Maurice Ravel's Boléro and Darius Milhaud's La création du monde.

The saxophonist Timothy McAllister became acquainted with the composer after performing saxophone parts in Adams's Nixon in China and City Noir. McAllister later suggested the possibility of performing a new work by Adams, to which the saxophonist recalled, "...we were having dinners and lunches out at New World Symphony (in Miami Beach, Florida); I believe it was March of 2011. We were walking to dinner one night and he said, 'I think I should write you a piece.' I worked hard to contain my elation at the mere suggestion." McAllister continued, "I let it go, and over a year went by, and -- you know how it is with people, you kind of fall in and out of touch. I just kind of stayed on his radar as I kept doing 'City Noir,' and then in February of 2012 I received an e-mail out of the blue from him, saying that he'd finished 'The Gospel According to the Other Mary,' and he was thinking about the next project and he'd like to do a saxophone concerto in Sydney, and asked if I was free." McAllister later described the concerto as "some of the hardest music I've ever played," adding, "It's traditional in a way that's incredibly challenging."

=== Structure ===
The Saxophone Concerto has a duration of roughly 30 minutes and is composed in two parts:

1. Animato: tranquillo, suave
2. Molto vivo: a hard, driving pulse

=== Instrumentation ===
The work is scored for alto saxophone and an orchestra comprising piccolo, two flutes, two oboes, English horn (doubling 3rd oboe), two clarinets, bass clarinet, two bassoons, three horns, two trumpets, harp, piano, celesta, and strings.

== Reception ==
Reviewing the world premiere, Harriet Cunningham of The Sydney Morning Herald highly praised the Saxophone Concerto, writing, "Adams has thrown down the gauntlet with a solo line which demands speed, flexibility, musicality and, above all, stamina to keep going with barely a bar's rest. McAllister delivered, punching out the 'nervous bebop' sound (Adams' description) with manic intensity, like a Charlie Parker or Stan Getz solo sustained across 30 minutes." She continued, "But the most beautiful moments were all Adams, from the brain-addling cross-rhythms of the final movement to the delicate interplay between solo saxophone and clarinet." The work was also lauded by Charles T. Downey of The Classical Review, who observed, "Adams pushes the soloist to the edge with dizzying scales and disjunct leaping passages, often bouncing off the orchestra in syncopated or otherwise disorienting rhythmic patterns. [...] All in all, Adam's Saxophone Concerto is a worthy addition to a small but growing repertory for this instrument." Alexandra Gardner of NewMusicBox added, "One of my favorite parts is the very opening of the piece, which sounds as if McAllister is pulling an entire orchestra out of the ground with his instrument alone."

Conversely, Andrew Clements of The Guardian called the piece "another note-spinning exercise in nostalgia" and wrote, "the solo part is expertly written for brilliant Timothy McAllister, and the music has the infectious, irresistible energy the composer generates so convincingly. But it never does anything you wouldn't expect, or reveals anything deeper beneath its shiny surfaces." Hannah Nepil of the Financial Times similarly said the piece "doesn't have enough to say." She added:

Self-confessedly influenced by legendary jazz saxophonists of yesteryear – among them John Coltrane and Eric Dolphy – it sounds more like a nostalgia-fest than an attempt to establish the saxophone's relevance to classical music. Long solo passages unwind in the manner of jazz improvisations that at times leave the orchestra sounding a little like a spare part. Between these we hear plenty of seductive sounds, with subtle echoes of composers including Debussy and Holst. The effect is atmospheric, and it's hard not to be carried along by the work's vigour... But beneath this gleaming shell, there's little to move or remember the piece by.

== Recording ==
A recording of the work, performed McAllister and the St. Louis Symphony under the conductor David Robertson, was released through Nonesuch Records on May 6, 2014. The disk also features Adams's 2009 symphony City Noir. The album later won the 2015 Grammy Award for Best Orchestral Performance.
