= Divertimento for Alto Saxophone =

Alto saxophone piece

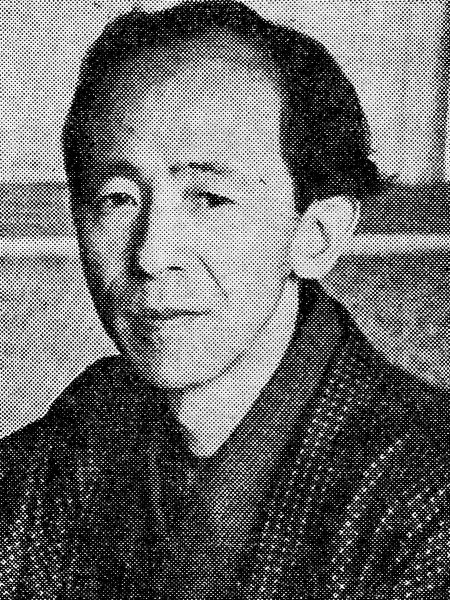
Kōmei Abe in 1956

Kōmei Abe's Divertimento for Alto Saxophone was originally written in 1951 for alto saxophone and piano and subsequently orchestrated in 1960. It is a result of his interest in woodwind instruments in the postwar years, which led him to learn to play the clarinet in addition to his previous training as a cellist. His interest can be traced back to his schoolyears when he was moved by its use in Maurice Ravel's orchestration of Pictures at an Exhibition.

The Divertimento is a lyrical and light-hearted work in the vein of French neoclassicism reflecting Abe's adscription to cosmopolitanism rather than to the primitivistic nationalism that was on the rise in Japanese music at the time. It consists of three movements, marked Andante sostenuto, Adagietto and Allegro lasting for about 20 minutes in total, and it was premiered by saxophonist Arata Sakaguchi.

The orchestral version was first recorded by Aleksey Volkov and the Russian Philharmonic conducted by Dmitry Yablonsky in 2005. Following the release the Divertimento was rated as "an enjoyable work, though not overly distinctive" by Jonathan Woolf from Musicweb International, while Steve Hicken from Sequenza21 found that it showed to good effect Abe's "straight-forwardly tonal, melodic, [...] lighter than air" style and Uncle Dave Lewis from AllMusic praised it as "sort of the kind of sax concerto that Richard Strauss might have written", deserving to be added into the instrument's concert repertoire.

== Discography ==
| Orchestra | Conductor | Location | Year | Label(s) | Duration |
|---|---|---|---|---|---|
| Russian Philharmonic | Dmitry Yablonsky | (Russia) VGTRK Studio 5, Moscow | 2005 | Naxos | 19:58 |
