= Timothy McAllister =

American saxophonist and music educator

- Born: October 21, 1972 (age 54); United States
- Genre: classical
- Occupations: saxophonist, teacher
- Instrument: Saxophone

Timothy McAllister (born October 21, 1972) is an American classical saxophonist and music educator, who, as of 2014, is Professor of Saxophone at the University of Michigan School of Music, Theatre & Dance.

== Career ==
Born in 1972, he gave his solo debut at age 16 with the Houston Civic Symphony. As a teenager he attended the Interlochen Center for the Arts. McAllister studied saxophone with Donald Sinta and conducting with H. Robert Reynolds at the University of Michigan. He holds a Bachelor of Music (1995), the Albert A. Stanley Medal (1995), Masters of Music (1997), and a Doctor of Musical Arts (2002). As of 2014, McAllister has been Professor of Saxophone at the University of Michigan School of Music, Theatre & Dance, a role held previously by Donald Sinta and Larry Teal. Each summer he teaches saxophone at Interlochen, the MPulse Saxophone Institute, Arosa Music Course in Switzerland, and the Orford Music Academy in Canada. From 2012 to 2014, McAllister was Co-Director of the Institute for New Music and saxophone professor at the Bienen School of Music at Northwestern.

He has premiered over 250 new works by composers including: Gunther Schuller, Caleb Burhans, Jennifer Higdon, Benjamin Broening, Kati Agocs, Mischa Zupko, Gregory Wanamaker, Roshanne Etezady, Kristin Kuster, William Bolcom, Martin Bresnick, Steven Mackey, Lee Hyla, Libby Larsen, Lei Liang, John Harbison, David Rakowski, Zhou Long, Chen Yi, Joel Puckett, Brian Fennelly, Evan Chambers, Ken Ueno, Donnacha Dennehy, David T. Little. His recording of William Bolcom’s Concert Suite for Alto Saxophone and Band was nominated for multiple Grammy Awards.

In 2013, he premiered Saxophone Concerto dedicated to him by the composer John Adams with the Sydney Symphony Orchestra at the Sydney Opera House. The premiere was conducted by the composer. This concerto was a joint commission by St Louis, Baltimore and Sydney Symphony Orchestras and Fundacao Orquestra Sinfonica do estado de Sao Paulo. McAllister had previously given the World Premiere of Adams’ City Noir in 2009. He is featured as the saxophone soloist on City Noir (album) which won the 2014 Grammy Award for Best Orchestral Performance.

He is the soprano chair of the PRISM Saxophone Quartet. He also regularly performs with the Chicago Symphony Orchestra, the Cabrillo Festival Orchestra, and the Los Angeles Philharmonic.

He appears on over 50 albums as a soloist, chamber musician, and orchestral saxophonist.

== Selected discography ==
- The Inaugural Concert: Gustavo Dudamel DVD (LA Philharmonic) 2009, Deutsche Grammophon
- Concerto for Soprano Saxophone and Wind Ensemble, by John Mackey (ASU Wind Symphony) 2012, Tresona Multimedia
- John Cage (Simone Mancuso, percussion; including McAllister’s version of “Ryoanji”) 2012, Stradivarius
- The Singing Gobi Desert (Prism Quartet) 2013
- John Adams: City Noir; Saxophone Concerto (St. Louis Symphony Orchestra) 2014, Nonesuch Records (2015 GRAMMY winner)
- Music of Matthew Levy (Prism Quartet) 2014
- Heritage/Evolution (Prism Quartet) 2014
- Belle Nuit (Kathryn Goodson, piano) 2015, Navona Records
- Zae Munn: They were mysterious guests (Lucia Unrau, Piano and others) 2015, Navona Records
- The Fifth Century (Gavin Bryars, The Crossing and Prism Quartet) 2016, ECM New Series (2017 GRAMMY winner)
- Spiritualist: Kenneth Fuchs (includes Saxophone Concerto “Rush”) (London Symphony Orchestra) 2018, Naxos (2019 GRAMMY winner)
- Lost Horizon: Guillaume Connesson (includes ‘A Kind of Trane’ Concerto) (Brussels Philharmonic) 2019, Deutsche Grammophon
- Animal, Vegetable, Mineral (Prism Quartet) 2019, XAS Records
- Surfaces and Essences (Prism Quartet) 2020, XAS Records
- Westland: Andy Scott (Liz Ames, Piano) 2020, Naxos
- Notturno (Liz Ames, Piano) 2020, XAS Records
