= City Noir =

Symphonic work by John Adams

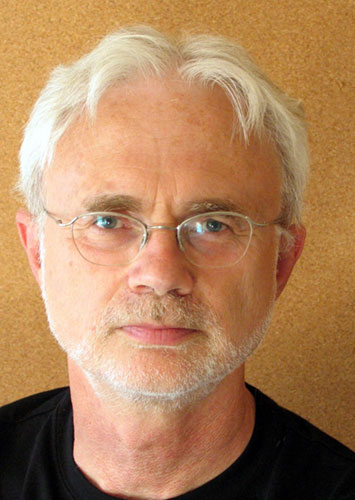
John Adams in 2008

City Noir is a 2009 symphonic work by the composer John Adams. A primary inspiration for the piece is the work of historian Kevin Starr on urban California in the late 1940s and early 1950s. The composer characterizes the work as "jazz-inflected symphonic music", citing the French composer Darius Milhaud as originator of this trend. It has a duration of 35 minutes, features solos for alto saxophone, trumpet, trombone, horn, viola, and double bass, and has three movements:

1. The City and Its Double
2. The Song Is for You
3. Boulevard Night

The piece was co-commissioned by the Los Angeles Philharmonic Association, the London Symphony Orchestra in association with Cité de la Musique, the Zaterdag Matinee and the Toronto Symphony Orchestra. It received its first public performance by the Los Angeles Philharmonic on October 8, 2009, conducted by Gustavo Dudamel, with Carrie Dennis (viola), Timothy McAllister (alto saxophone), William Lane (horn), Donald Green (trumpet), and James Miller (trombone) playing the prominent solo parts. This concert was filmed and subsequently televised internationally and released on DVD and digital download by Deutsche Grammophon.

== Critical reception ==
Anthony Tommasini, reviewing the world premiere, stated that "Mr. Adams has become a master at piling up materials in thick yet lucid layers. Moment to moment the music is riveting. Yet here as in some other Adams scores, I found it hard to discern the structural spans and architecture".

Following its European premiere in March 2010, Richard Morrison praised the work as "infused with the seething energies, menace and melodrama of one particular cinematic genre — the film noir. The restlessness, the sardonic relish of urban angst familiar from the hard-bitten tales of Hammett and Chandler seeps through it like a dark stain". In regard to the same performance, Nick Kimberley wrote that the piece is "suffused with longing for a past in which big, bold gestures and firm-footed melody were the order of the day. And yet so affectionate is Adams’s manipulation of his musical memories that City Noir emerges as a dazzling showpiece. It may look resolutely backwards but it knows where it’s going".

In 2019, The Guardian ranked City Noir the 24th greatest work of art music since 2000, with Andrew Clements describing it as a "vivid portrait of Los Angeles [...] that references a host of American idioms without ever getting too specific. It’s not his finest orchestral work by any means (those came last century), but an effective, extrovert showpiece."

== Instrumentation ==
The work is scored for the following instrumentation.

Woodwinds
piccolo
3 flutes (3rd doubling on piccolo)
3 oboes
English horn
3 B♭ clarinets (1st and 2nd doubling on A clarinets, 3rd doubling on 2nd bass clarinet)
bass clarinet
alto saxophone
2 bassoons
contrabassoon

Brass
6 horns
4 trumpets
3 trombones
tuba
Percussion
timpani
5 percussionists
jazz drum set

Keyboard
piano
celesta

Strings
2 harps

violins (1st and 2nd)
violas
cellos
double basses
