= Piccolo oboe =

Smallest of the oboe musical instrument family

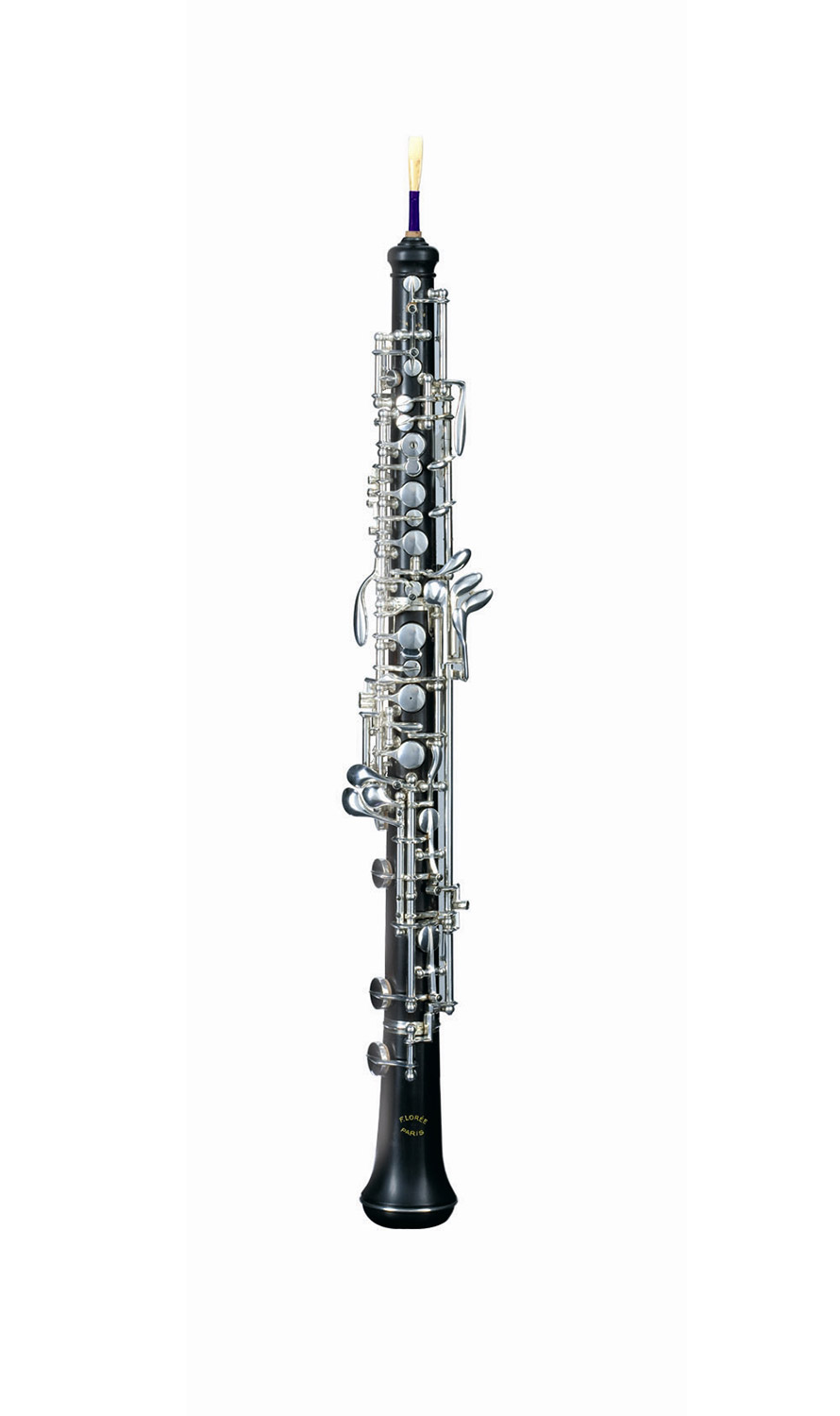

Woodwind instrument
- Classification: Wind; Woodwind; Double reed
- Hornbostel–Sachs classification: 422.112-71 (Double-reeded aerophone with keys)

Playing range
- Piccolo oboe sounds a minor third or perfect fourth higher than written.

Related instruments
- Oboe; Oboe d'amore; Cor anglais (English horn); Oboe da caccia; Wiener oboe; Bombarde; Bass oboe; Heckelphone; Lupophon; Contrabass oboe; Piston oboe

The piccolo oboe, also known as the piccoloboe or sopranino oboe and historically called an oboe musette (or just musette), is the smallest and highest pitched member of the oboe family. Pitched in E♭ or F above the regular oboe (i.e. notated a minor third or perfect fourth lower than sounding), the piccolo oboe is a sopranino version of the oboe, comparable to the E♭ clarinet. It is most commonly found in early 20th-century marching band music, and more rarely in chamber music ensembles or contemporary compositions.

== Makers ==
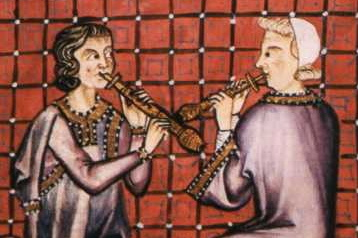
Two shawm players from the Cantigas de Santa Maria (13th century)

Piccolo oboes are produced by the French makers F. Lorée (pitched in F) and Marigaux (pitched in E♭), as well as the Italian firm Fratelli Patricola (pitched in E♭). Lorée calls its instrument "piccolo oboe or oboe musette (in F)", while Marigaux and Patricola call their instruments simply "oboe musette".

== Repertoire ==
The instrument has found the most use in chamber and contemporary music, where it is valued for its unusual tone colour. It is also employed in double-reed ensembles, such as Amoris, and in film scoring. Perhaps the best-known pieces requiring piccolo oboe are "Solo for Oboe Instruments" (1971) and "Concerto for Oboe and Orchestra No. 2", both by Bruno Maderna; "Vérifications" by Samuel Andreyev; and "Ar-Loth" (1967) by Paolo Renosto.

Other contemporary works for the instrument are "Scherzo Furioso" by William Blezard, "Tasmanian Ants" by Ian Keith Harris, "Iberian Improvisations" and "Bailables" by Leonard Salzedo, and "Variations on a Sicilian Shepherd Tune" by Clive Strutt.

Two concerti have been written featuring the piccolo oboe in addition to the other four members of the oboe family, these works being David Stock's Oborama (second movement, "Crisp, Bright") and James Stephenson's "Rituals and Dances", both written for Alex Klein.

== See also ==
- Oboe
- Piccolo heckelphone
