= Wiener oboe =

Viennese variant of the oboe

- The Wiener oboe retains external and internal characteristics of the classical oboe from which it was derived.

Woodwind instrument
- Classification: Wind; Woodwind; Double reed
- Hornbostel–Sachs classification: 422.112-71 (Double-reeded aerophone with keys)
- Developed: Late 19th century from the classical oboe

Playing range
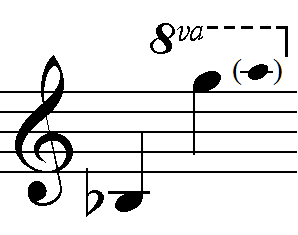

Related instruments
- Oboe; Oboe d'amore; Cor anglais (English horn); Oboe da caccia; Baroque oboe; Bass oboe; Heckelphone; Contrabass oboe

The Akademiemodel Wiener oboe, commonly referred to as the Wiener oboe or Viennese oboe, is a type of modern oboe first developed in the 1880s by Josef Hajek. The design of the Wiener oboe retains the essential bore and tonal characteristics of the historical oboe. The Wiener oboe is named after its origins in Vienna (German: Wien).

== Sound ==
The Wiener oboe is a hybrid of German and Austrian designs. It has a wider internal bore, shorter and broader reed and a different fingering schema than the Conservatoire oboe. In their definitive historical work The Oboe, Geoffrey Burgess and Bruce Haynes write (page 212) "The differences are most clearly marked in the middle register, which is reedier and more pungent, and the upper register, which is richer in harmonics on the Viennese oboe". Guntram Wolf describes them: "From the concept of the bore, the Viennese oboe is the last representative of the historical oboes, adapted for the louder, larger orchestra, and fitted with an extensive mechanism. Its great advantage is the ease of speaking, even in the lowest register. It can be played very expressively and blends well with other instruments." The Viennese oboe is (with the Viennese horn) perhaps the most distinctive member of the Vienna Philharmonic instrumentarium.

== History ==
The oboe in use in Vienna in the early and mid-19th century was originally a design called the Koch/Sellner oboe. In 1825 Viennese oboist and teacher Joseph Sellner wrote an oboe tutor (Theoretische-praktische Oboeschule), which included an illustrated fingering chart. The oboe associated with these materials was produced by Stefan Koch (1772–1828). This instrument was very well regarded in central Europe. In addition to a modernized mechanism with up to 13 keys, the Koch/Sellner oboe resembled the conservatoire oboe used today in that it had a narrow bore and a similarly bright tone. As a relatively advanced musical tool it satisfied the needs of Viennese musicians until the end of the 19th century.

One instrument maker whose designs went in the opposite direction, utilizing a wide bore design, was the highly regarded German maker Karl Friedrich Golde (1803–1873) from Dresden. His ideal oboe sound contained a deep, rich, warm tonality: "a powerful depth and a full sound will be achieved, … [not] a thin, nasal sound, like the French and Viennese [Koch] oboes.” Ironically, just a few years after his death his design would supplant the Koch oboe and become the new Wiener oboe of the 20th Century.

In 1880 oboist Richard Baumgärtel (1858–1941) brought his Golde oboe with him to Vienna, where the essential design was subsequently adapted by Josef Hajek (1849–1926) to play in the ‘diapason normal’ tuning of A = 435 used in the Austrian Empire. Hajek and later other makers, notably Hermann Zuleger (1885–1949) created a new instrument with changes and improvements especially to the key mechanism. The new Wiener oboe retained the essence of the classical oboe’s internal bore, as well as elegantly simplified classical external features such as the baluster and finial, but with greatly expanded keywork.

The aftermath of the Second World War witnessed the takeover of the Conservatoire oboe and a slow phase-out of the "German oboe" in Germany. In Austria the Wiener oboe faced a period of general decline, and with the death of Zuleger in 1949, quality instruments became scarce. This unsatisfactory situation only worsened as time went by, with the construction of instruments almost coming to a standstill. In the 1980s, however, the Yamaha company in Japan began to manufacture Wiener oboes, creating a hitherto unprecedented supply of quality instruments.

With the resurgence of interest in early music in the late 20th century, the Wiener oboe has emerged as an alternative to the use of hautboys or baroque oboes, retaining the tone color of the early instruments but not the significant limitations. In more recent years, as interest and use of the Wiener oboe has slowly increased, oboes are now being made by a number of makers such as André Constantinides, Karl Rado, Guntram Wolf, and Christian Rauch.

== Materials ==
The modern Wiener oboe is most commonly made from grenadilla, though some manufacturers also make oboes out of the traditional European material boxwood.

== Notable Wiener oboe manufacturers ==
=== Manufacturers still in business ===
- Karl Rado (Vienna, Austria)
- Guntram Wolf (Kronach, Germany) Note: After Guntram Wolf's death in 2013, his children Peter and Claudia Wolf took over the business.

=== Manufacturers out of business or no longer producing Wiener oboes ===
- Yamaha (Japan)
- Christian Rauch (Innsbruck, Austria)
- André Constantinides (Pöggstall, Austria)
- Hubert Schück (Vienna, Austria)
- Zuleger & Co. (Vienna, Austria)

== Sources ==
- Burgess, Geoffrey, and Bruce Haynes: 2004, The Oboe, The Yale Musical Instrument Series, New Haven, Connecticut and London: Yale University Press, ISBN 0-300-09317-9
- Haynes, Bruce: 2001, The Eloquent Oboe: A History of the Hautboy 1640–1760, Oxford Early Music Series, Oxford and New York: Oxford University Press, ISBN 0-19-816646-X
- Rauch, Christian: 1999, “Wiener Oboen im 19. und 20. Jahrhundert”, Rohrblatt : Magazin für Oboe, Klarinette, Fagott und Saxophon 14:
