= Bass oboe =

Double reed instrument in the woodwind family

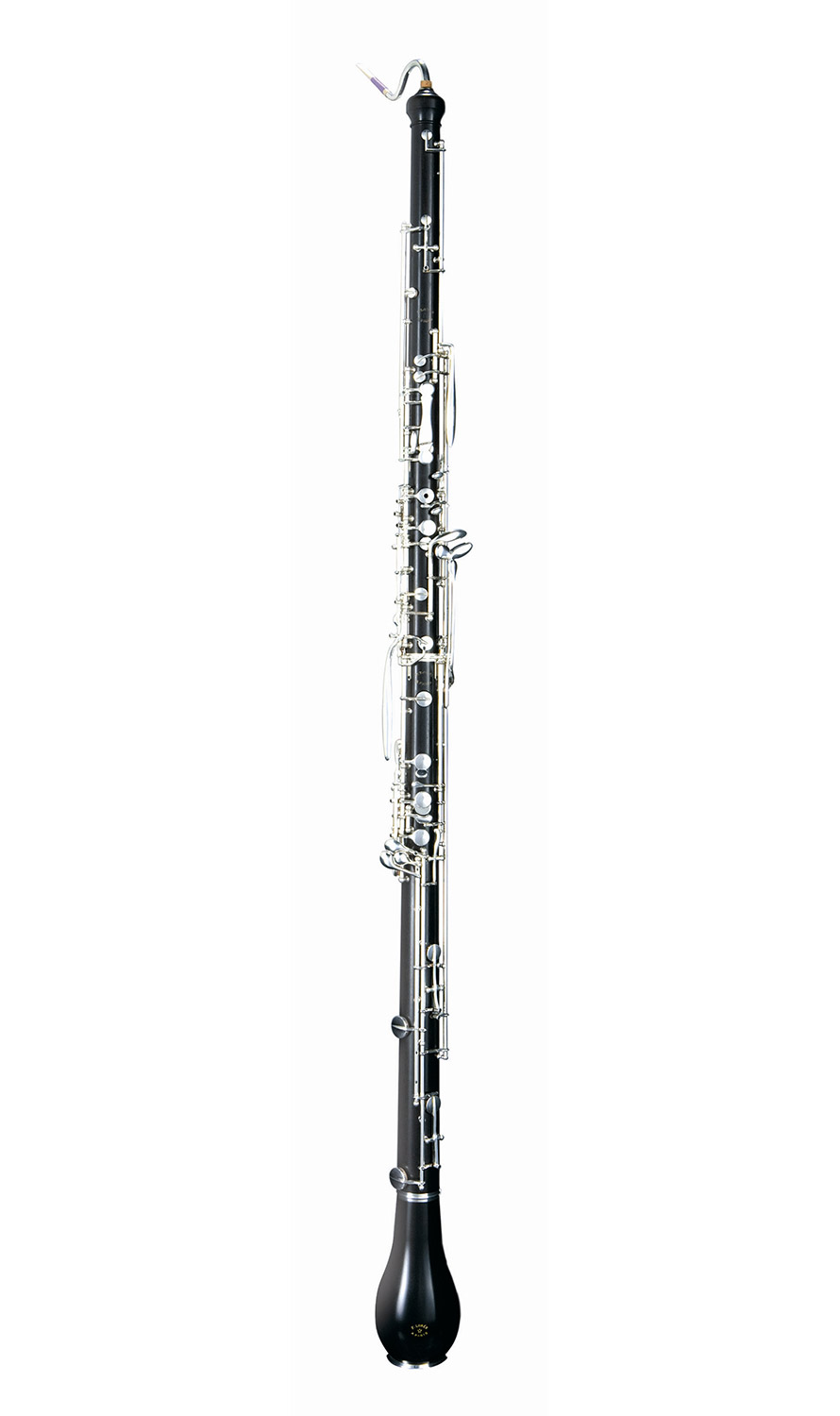

Woodwind instrument
- Classification: Wind; Woodwind; Double reed
- Hornbostel–Sachs classification: 422.112-71 (Double-reeded aerophone with keys)
- Developed: 19th century

Playing range
- Bass oboe is notated in treble clef, sounding one octave lower than written.

Related instruments
- Piccolo oboe; Piccolo heckelphone; Oboe; Oboe d’amore; Cor anglais (English horn); Oboe da caccia; Heckelphone; Lupophon; Contrabass oboe

Demonstration of a bass oboe by Morven Bell at St Cecilia's Hall, Edinburgh, in 2021

The bass oboe or baritone oboe is a double reed instrument in the woodwind family. It is essentially twice the size of the familiar soprano oboe in C, sounding an octave lower; it has a deep, full tone somewhat akin to that of its higher-pitched cousin, the cor anglais (English horn). The bass oboe is notated in treble clef, sounding one octave lower than written. Its lowest sounding note is B_{2} (in scientific pitch notation), one octave and a semitone below middle C, although an extension with an additional key may be inserted between the lower joint and bell of the instrument in order to produce a low B♭_{2}. The instrument's bocal (crook) first curves away from and then toward the player (unlike the bocal of the cor anglais and oboe d'amore), looking rather like a flattened metal question mark; another crook design resembles the shape of a bass clarinet neckpiece. The bass oboe uses its own double reed, similar to but larger than that of the cor anglais.

== Etymology ==
The instrument is known popularly as the "bass oboe" in the English language and as "hautbois baryton" ('baritone oboe') in French. The bass designation is in concurrence with that of the bass flute in the flute family and the bass clarinet in the clarinet family—an instrument pitched an octave below the principal instrument of its genre.

== History ==
Early bass oboes were modeled after bassoons, with a boot joint and bocal (such as the Triébert's instruments, which still had a bulb-shaped bell) and some holes drilled obliquely; later an enlarged cor anglais design was adopted. The concept of the bass oboe as an enlarged cor anglais survived, and the hautbois baryton, redesigned by François Lorée, was introduced in 1889.

Some confusion exists between the bass oboe and the Heckelphone, a double reed instrument of similar register introduced by the firm of Wilhelm Heckel in 1904, and which is distinguished from standard members of the oboe family by its wider bore, different fingering system (on older instruments), and larger bell. As a result, it is not always clear in English orchestral works of the early 20th century which of the two instruments is intended when the composer requests "bass oboe".

The instrument has been manufactured sporadically by various companies, including F. Lorée, Marigaux, Rigoutat, Fossati, and others. It is usually a special order instrument, and its purchase price normally exceeds that of a top-of-the-line cor anglais.

== Repertoire ==
- In the Great Museum of our Memory – for bass oboe by Brian Cherney
- The East Coast – concerto for bass oboe and orchestra by Gavin Bryars
- Earth Spirit – for bass oboe and orchestra by Yuang Chen
- The Sacrifice of Prometheus – for bass oboe and orchestra by Marko Bajzer

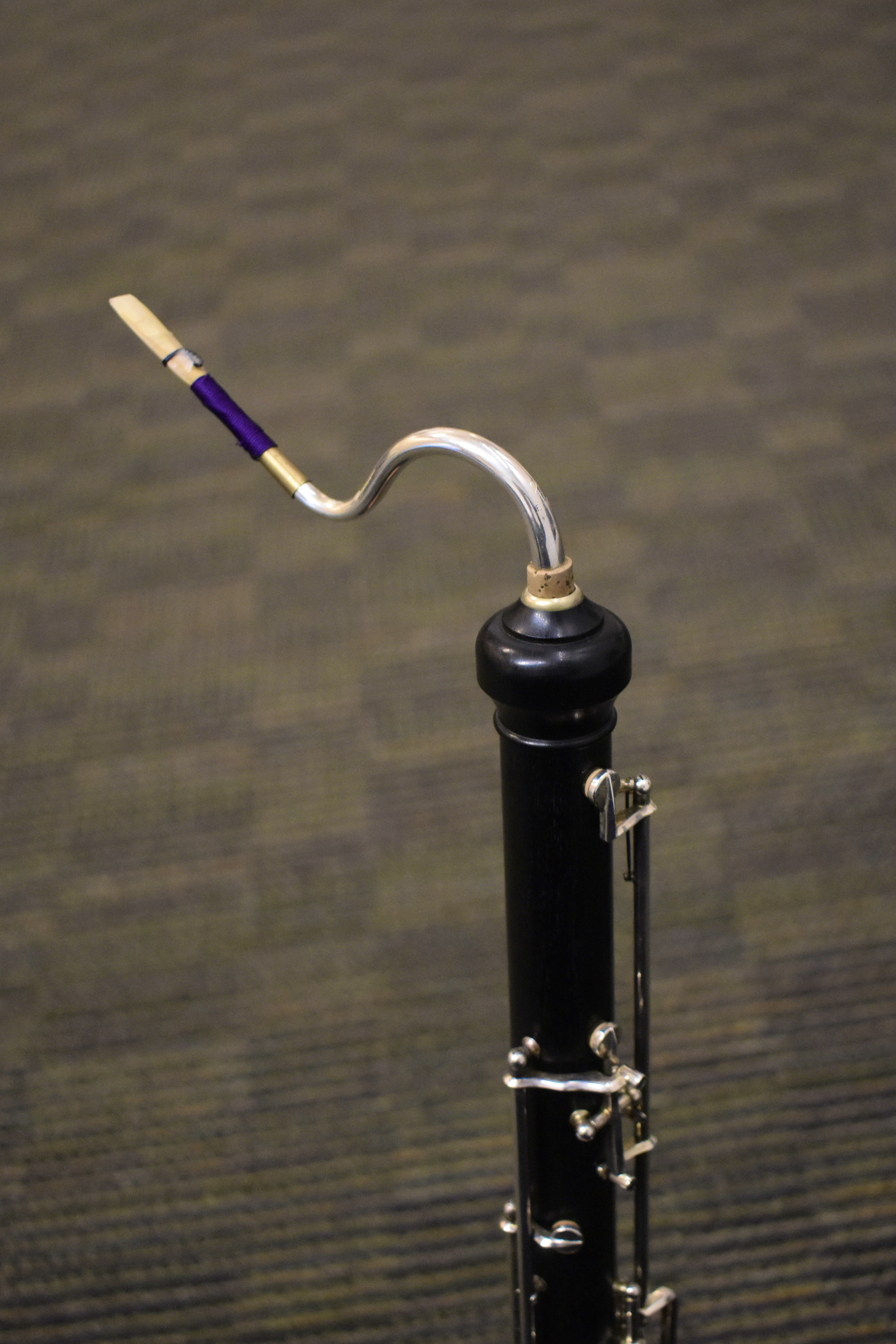
The top joint of a bass oboe, showing the bocal's distinct swan neck curve

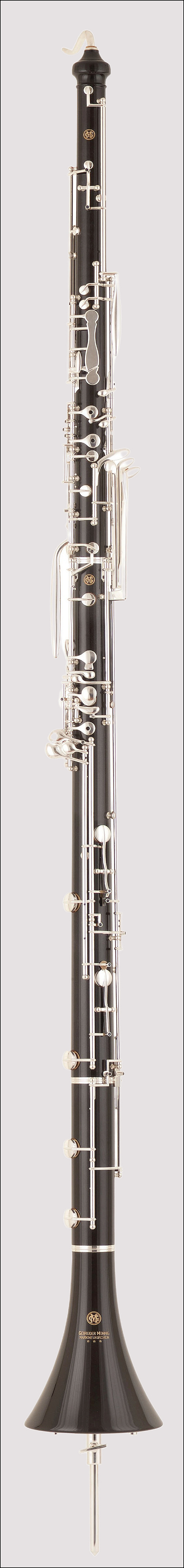
Bass oboe by Gebrüder Mönnig

One of the most notable uses of the bass oboe is in Gustav Holst's The Planets, where the instrument is used to great effect and provides a tone of which no other instrument is capable. Notable solo lines include some faint parts during "Mars", during the bitonal runs by the woodwinds in "Mercury", numerous exposed lines in the quieter moments of "Saturn" (probably the best example of a solo in the whole work), and in the fifth and sixth bars of the bassoon's soli after the opening notes of "Uranus". The bass oboe is also prominently featured in the first interlude of Michael Tippett's Triple Concerto. There is also a very substantial solo in the second movement of Thomas Adès's "Asyla". Frederick Delius scored for the bass oboe in six of his works: Songs of Sunset, A Mass of Life, Requiem, An Arabesque, Fennimore and Gerda, and Dance Rhapsody No. 1; however, the latest research reveals that despite his use of this term, Delius's intended instrument was the heckelphone. Arnold Bax calls for it in his Symphony No. 1, and Havergal Brian requires an instrument in both The Gothic symphony and his Symphony No. 4, Das Siegeslied. Humphrey Searle calls for the instrument in his Third Symphony (1960). Percy Grainger includes the bass oboe in Children's March and The Warriors, which has a notable large solo for the instrument in the middle of the piece. The bass oboe solo in The Warriors and "Saturn" of The Planets are the more famous bass oboe excerpts.

The bass oboe has not as yet come into its own as a solo instrument; only a few solo bass oboe concertos have been written to date, for example, The East Coast, by English composer Gavin Bryars, composed in 1994, and a 2016 Concerto by Canadian composer Christopher Tyler Nickel. The former work was written for the Canadian performer Lawrence Cherney, who uses a bass oboe manufactured by F. Lorée. Two concerti have been written featuring the bass oboe in addition to the other four members of the oboe family, these works being David Stock's Oborama (bass oboe featured in the fourth movement, "Dark and Solemn") and James Stephenson's "Rituals and Dances", both written for Alex Klein. Marko Bajzer recently composed The Sacrifice of Prometheus for bass oboe and orchestra, which premiered with the Reno Philharmonic.

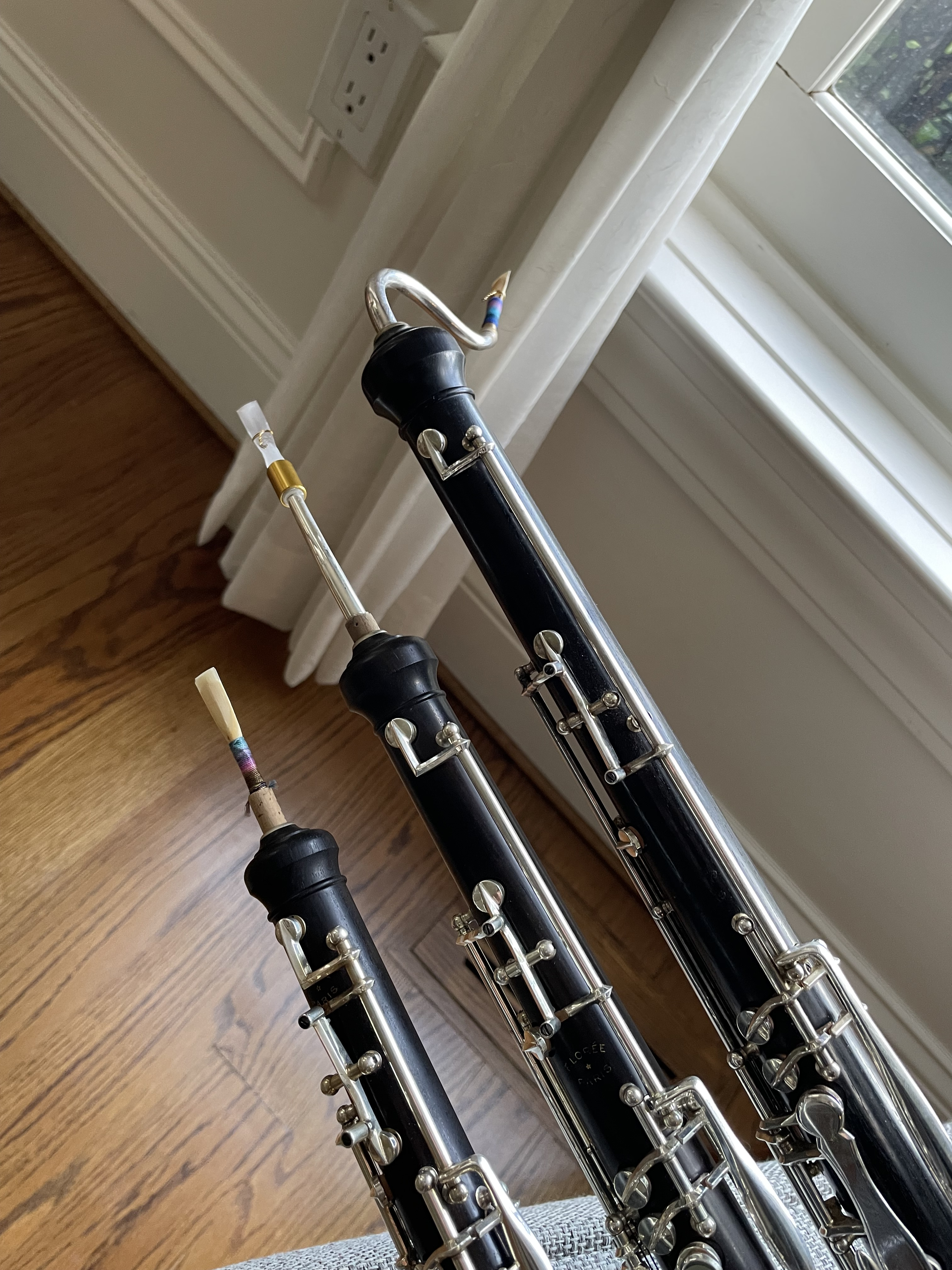
From left: oboe, cor anglais, and bass oboe

British oboist Michael Sluman has commissioned approximately 60 works for the bass oboe, a number of which have been performed at recitals in the UK, the 2016 Australian Double Reed Society in Sydney, and the 2018 International Double Reed Society Conference in Granada. These works consist of solo, orchestral, chamber, and recital pieces, along with a number of quartets for oboe, oboe d'amore, cor anglais, and bass oboe, written for the Asyla Oboe Quartet. Sluman has given lectures on the bass oboe at the Royal Academy of Music, London, King's College London, the University of North Texas and the Royal Northern College of Music.

Robert Moran's Survivor from Darmstadt, for nine amplified bass oboes, was commissioned by oboist Nora Post and premiered in 1984. At least one sonata for bass oboe and piano, by Simon Zaleski, has been written.
