= Oboe d'amore =

Musical instrument in the oboe family

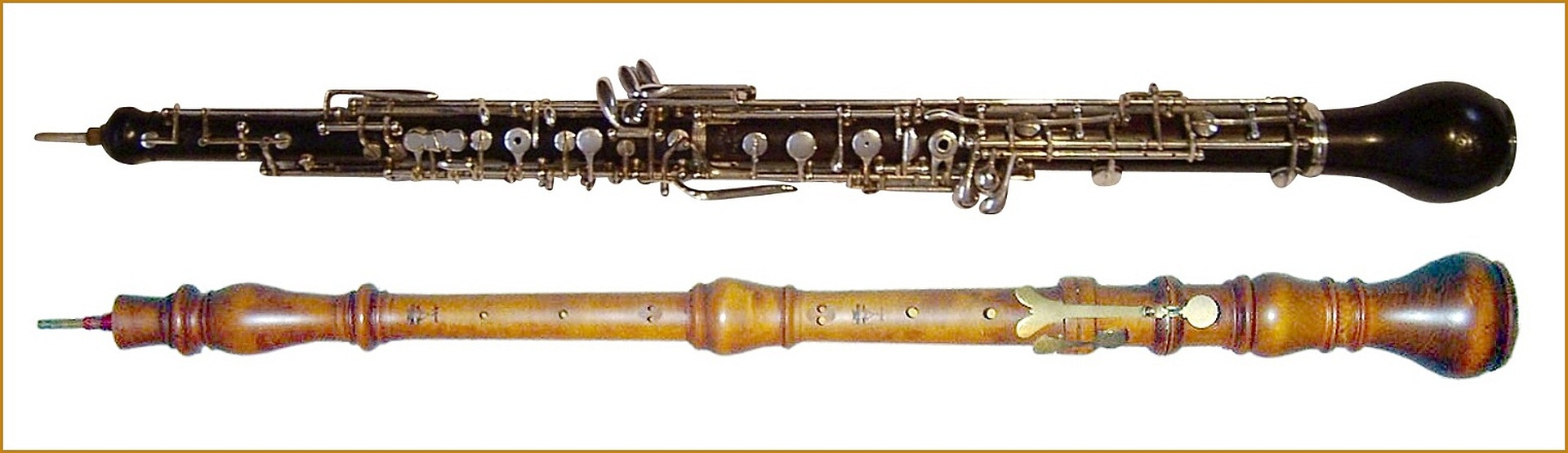
- Modern and baroque oboe d'amore, Denner copy

Woodwind instrument
- Classification: Woodwind; Wind; Double reed
- Hornbostel–Sachs classification: 422.112-71 (Double-reeded aerophone with keys)
- Developed: Eighteenth century

Related instruments
- Piccolo oboe; Piccolo heckelphone; Oboe; Cor anglais (English horn); Oboe da caccia; Bass oboe; Heckelphone; Lupophon; Contrabass oboe

The oboe d'amore (Italian for 'oboe of love'; (pronounced [ˈɔːboe daˈmoːre]), less commonly hautbois d'amour (French: [obwɑ damuʁ]), is a double-reed woodwind musical instrument in the oboe family. Slightly larger than the oboe, it has a less assertive and a more tranquil and serene tone, and is sometimes considered the alto of the oboe family, between the oboe (soprano) and the cor anglais, or English horn (tenor, but sometimes also considered an alto). It is a transposing instrument pitched in A sounding a minor third lower than it is notated. The bell (called Liebesfuß) is pear-shaped and the instrument uses a crook or bocal, similar to but shorter than that of the cor anglais.

== Invention and use ==
The oboe d'amore was invented in the eighteenth century and was first used by Christoph Graupner in his cantata Wie wunderbar ist Gottes Güt (1717). Johann Sebastian Bach wrote many pieces—a concerto, many of his cantatas, and the Et in Spiritum sanctum movement of his Mass in B minor—for the instrument. Georg Philipp Telemann also frequently employed the oboe d'amore.

Its popularity waning in the late eighteenth century, the oboe d'amore fell into disuse for about 100 years until composers such as Richard Strauss (Symphonia Domestica, where the instrument represents the child), Claude Debussy (Gigues, where the oboe d'amore has a long solo passage), Maurice Ravel, Frederick Delius, and others began using it once again in the early years of the twentieth century. It can be heard in Toru Takemitsu's Vers, l'arc-en-ciel, Palma (1984), but its most famous modern usage is, perhaps, in Ravel's Boléro (1928), where the oboe d'amore follows the E-flat clarinet to recommence the main theme for the second time. Gustav Mahler employed the instrument once, in Um Mitternacht (1901), one of his five Rückert-Lieder. In his orchestration of Mussorgsky's Pictures at an Exhibition, Vladimir Ashkenazy uses the oboe d'amore to highlight the plaintive solo of the Il vecchio castello movement.

In the twentieth century, it was used extensively by Philip Glass in his opera Akhnaten (1983) to complement the countertenor register of the titular character.

David Stock's concerto "Oborama" features oboe d'amore as a soloist alongside cor anglais, musette, bass oboe, and oboe (with the oboe player using an oboe d'amore in the third movement)

== Modern instruments ==
Modern makers of oboes d'amore include Howarth of London (instruments in African blackwood or cocobolo wood), F. Lorée in Paris (instruments in African blackwood or violetwood) and others such as French makers Rigoutat, Fossati and Marigaux, Italian maker Bulgheroni (who offer instruments in grenadilla, violetwood, cocobolo, rosewood, palisander, and cocus wood), Japanese maker Joseph and German makers Püchner, Mönnig and Ludwig Franck. New instruments cost approximately £8,250 at 2016 prices (roughly $11,885 US), comparable to the cost of a new cor anglais. This cost, coupled with the limited call for the instrument, leads many oboists not to possess their own oboe d'amore, but to rent one when their work dictates the need. For the same reason, however, second-hand oboes d'amore surface from time to time with very little wear, demonstrating they were well loved (and yet with very little reduction in price over a new instrument).
