= Heckelphone =

Lower-pitched instrument of the oboe family

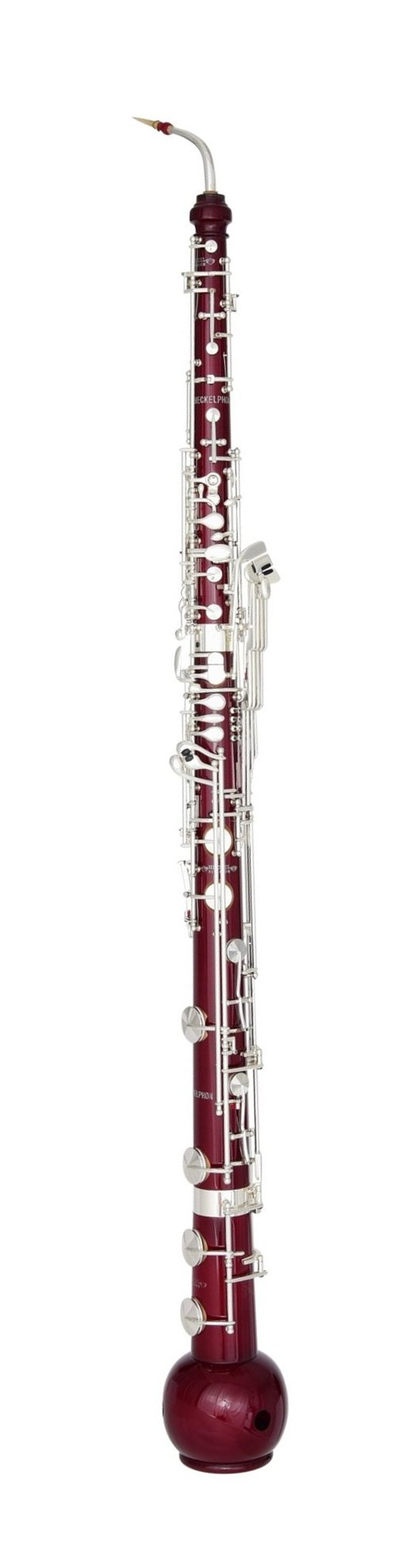

Woodwind instrument
- Classification: Wind; Woodwind; Double reed
- Hornbostel–Sachs classification: 422.112 (Double-reeded aerophone with keys)
- Developed: 1904

Related instruments
- Oboe; Piccolo oboe; Oboe d'amore; Cor anglais (English horn); Oboe da caccia; Wiener Oboe; Bass oboe; Contrabass oboe; Piston oboe

Demonstration of a heckelphone at St Cecilia's Hall, Edinburgh

The heckelphone (German: Heckelphon) is a musical instrument invented by Wilhelm Heckel and his sons. The idea of inventing the instrument was initiated by Richard Wagner, who suggested its concept at the occasion of a visit of Wilhelm Heckel in 1879. Introduced in 1904, the heckelphone resembles an oboe but is pitched an octave lower, similar to the bass oboe. In addition to the pitch difference, the heckelphone has a larger bore.

== General characteristics ==
The heckelphone is a double reed instrument of the oboe family, but with a wider bore and hence a heavier and more penetrating tone. It is pitched an octave below the oboe and furnished with an additional semitone taking its range down to A. It reads in treble clef sounding one octave lower than written. It was intended to provide a broad oboe-like sound in the middle register of the large orchestrations of the turn of the twentieth century. In the orchestral repertoire it is generally used as the bass of an oboe section incorporating the oboe and the cor anglais (English horn), filling the gap between the oboes and bassoons.

The heckelphone is approximately 1.3 m (4 ft 3 in) in length and heavy enough to require that the instrument rest on the floor, supported by a short metal peg attached to the underside of its bulbous bell ("Liebesfuss"). An alternate second bell, called a "muting" bell, is also available, which serves to muffle the instrument for playing in a small ensemble. This arrangement is unique among double-reed instruments. It is played with a double reed that closely resembles a bassoon reed or large cor anglais reed.

Smaller piccolo- and terz-heckelphones were developed, pitched respectively in (high) F and E♭, but few were made, and they were less successful than the baritone-range instrument.

== Musical uses ==
The first use of the heckelphone was in Richard Strauss's 1905 opera Salome. The instrument was subsequently employed in the same composer's Elektra, as well as An Alpine Symphony (though this part frequently calls for notes that are below the range of the heckelphone), Josephslegende and Festliches Präludium. It was adopted as part of the large orchestral palette of such works as Edgard Varèse's Amériques (1918–1921) and Arcana (1925–1927) and Carlos Chávez's Sinfonía de Antígona (1933). Aaron Copland's Short Symphony (Symphony No. 2, 1931–1933) calls for a player to double on cor anglais and heckelphone, but a cor anglais may be used for the entire part if a heckelphone is unavailable.

The heckelphone was also used by Gordon Jacob in his "Variations on Annie Laurie" which was performed in the first Hoffnung Music Festival Concert at the Royal Festival Hall, London, UK, in 1956. See Annetta Hoffnung's biography of Gerard Hoffnung and the sleeve notes to the complete Decca recording of the concert in question.

The heckelphone is often confused with F. Lorée's redesigned hautbois baryton which was introduced in 1889, the term "bass oboe" being widely used to describe both instruments. Among English composers of the early-20th century there was some vogue for the use of a "bass oboe", for example in Gustav Holst's orchestral suite The Planets (1916), as well as in several works of Frederick Delius (A Mass of Life, 1904–1905; Dance Rhapsody No. 1, 1908), Arnold Bax's Symphony No. 1 (1921), and Havergal Brian's Gothic Symphony (1919–1927) and Symphony No. 4 (Das Siegeslied). However, it is not in all cases clear which of the two instruments is intended—indeed, it is possible that sometimes the composers themselves were unclear as to the distinction. Strauss, however, mentions both instruments in his 1904 revision of Hector Berlioz's Grand Traité d'instrumentation et d'orchestration modernes, and (like Varèse) specifies the instrument by name in his orchestral scores, so preventing any ambiguity.

The heckelphone has also been employed in chamber music, one of the most notable instances being Hindemith's Trio for Heckelphone, Viola, and Piano, Op. 47 (1928). Graham Waterhouse wrote Four Epigraphs after Escher, Op. 35 (1993) for the same instrumentation.

The heckelphone is also featured in the orchestral music of Finnish composer Kalevi Aho. It is heard in his operas Insect Life (1985–1987), The Book of Secrets (1998), and Before We Are All Drowned (1995/1999), in the Symphonies no. 6 (1979–1980), 11 (1997–1998), 13 (2003), 15 (2009–2010), 17 (2017), and in his Piano Concerto no. 1 (1988–1989), Contrabassoon Concerto (2004–2005) and Oboe Concerto (2007). American composer William P. Perry used the heckelphone as part of a double reed quartet in his score for the film The Mysterious Stranger. There is a part for heckelphone in the concert band piece Two Sketches From The Orient by composer Cecil Burleigh, Op. 55 arranged by N. Clifford Page, published by Oliver Ditson Company 1926 and 1928.

== Modern use ==
For all its potential in adding weight to the lower registers of the woodwind section, the heckelphone remains a rarity on the orchestral scene—only about 150 heckelphones have been produced, of which around 100 are believed to be extant—and is seldom carried on the regular roster of professional orchestras.

The first annual meeting of the North American Heckelphone Society took place on August 6, 2001, at the Riverside Church in New York City, with six heckelphonists in attendance—possibly the first occasion upon which six such instruments had been assembled under one roof. Later meetings have included as many as 14 instruments. The group met annually in New York through 2006.

The centennial of the heckelphone in 2004–5 led to the publication of a number of articles on the instrument in organological journals. Among these were two in the German-language Rohrblatt by the Cologne player Georg Otto Klapproth; a comprehensive review article by Robert Howe and Peter Hurd, "The Heckelphone at 100", in the 2004 Journal of the American Musical Instrument Society; and a two-part article by Michael Finkelman in the 2005 issues of The Double Reed.

A recent development is the Lupophon (Lupophone), essentially an extended Heckelphone able to play lower notes such as those called for in the Alpine Symphony.

== Selected solo and chamber works ==
- Mielenz, Hans Concerto, Op. 60 for heckelphone and orchestra
- Ewazen, Eric Quintet for Heckelphone and String Quartet

== Discography ==
- Robert Howe, Heckelphone; Alan Lurie, Michael Dulac, piano (2005). Centennial Recital for Heckelphone. Wilbraham Music.
- Paul Winter Consort (1990). Earth: Voices of a Planet. Living Music.
- Paul Winter Consort (1995). The Man Who Planted Trees. Living Music.
- Paul Winter Consort (2010). Miho:Journey To The Mountain. Living Music
- Winter, Paul (1994). Prayer for the Wild Things. Living Music.
- Grossman and others (2002). Music by Paul Hindemith. Centaur Records.
- Arthur Grossman, Heckelphone; Lisa Bergman, piano. Arthur Grossman Plays Heckelphone. Wilhelm Heckel GmbH.
- Vittorio Piredda, "Voci in guerra" (2018) for heckelphone, harp, cello and photosongs.
- Martin Frutiger, Heckelphone; "Uncommon Concertos" Fabian Müller: Concerto for Heckelphone and Orchestra. ARS Produktion (2024)

== See also ==
- Piccolo heckelphone
- List of musical instruments
