= Lupophon =

Very low-pitched instrument of the oboe family

Lupophone
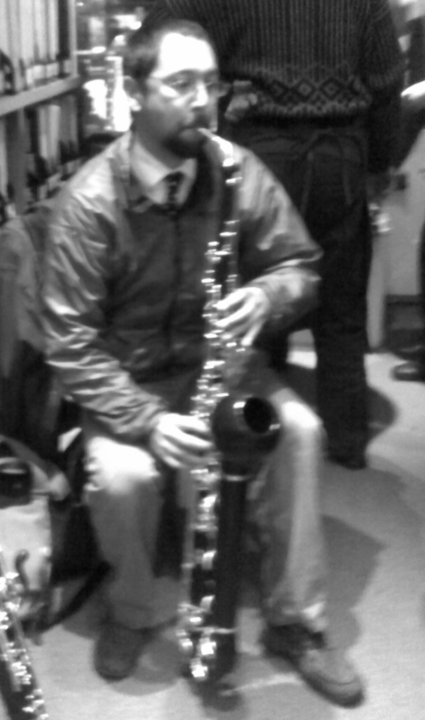
- A musician playing the lupophone

Woodwind instrument
- Classification: Wind; Woodwind; Double reed
- Hornbostel–Sachs classification: 422.112 (Double-reeded aerophone with keys)
- Developed: 2008

Related instruments
- Oboe; Piccolo oboe; Oboe d'amore; Cor anglais (English horn); Oboe da caccia; Wiener Oboe; Bass oboe; Contrabass oboe; Piston oboe

The Lupophon (or lupophone) is an extremely rare woodwind instrument in the oboe family that plays in a lower pitch than standard, and was developed by Guntram Wolf of Kronach and Benedikt Eppelsheim of Munich, Germany, manufactured by Guntram Wolf. The instrument takes its name after the Italian translation of the inventor's surname (lupo standing for wolf), as the sarrusophone, the saxhorn, the saxophone, the heckelphone, and the rothphone are named after their inventors. It is in effect a modified heckelphone, with a slightly smaller bore and range down to low F. The lower portion of the instrument is folded back on itself in order to manage the considerable length of the tube, somewhat in the manner of a saxophone. The addition of the four lowest semitones allows it to cover the full intended range of the heckelphone part of Richard Strauss' Eine Alpensinfonie, which descends beyond that instrument's lowest note.

The first chamber composition featuring the instrument in a solo capacity, PLP for lupophone and two pianos by Samuel Andreyev, was premiered by Martin Bliggenstorfer in Amsterdam on 15 March 2011.
