= Fratelli Patricola =

Patricola Brothers
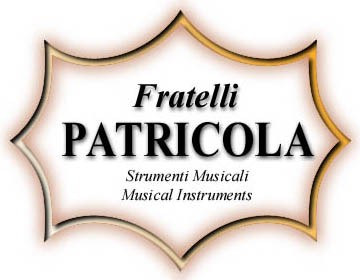

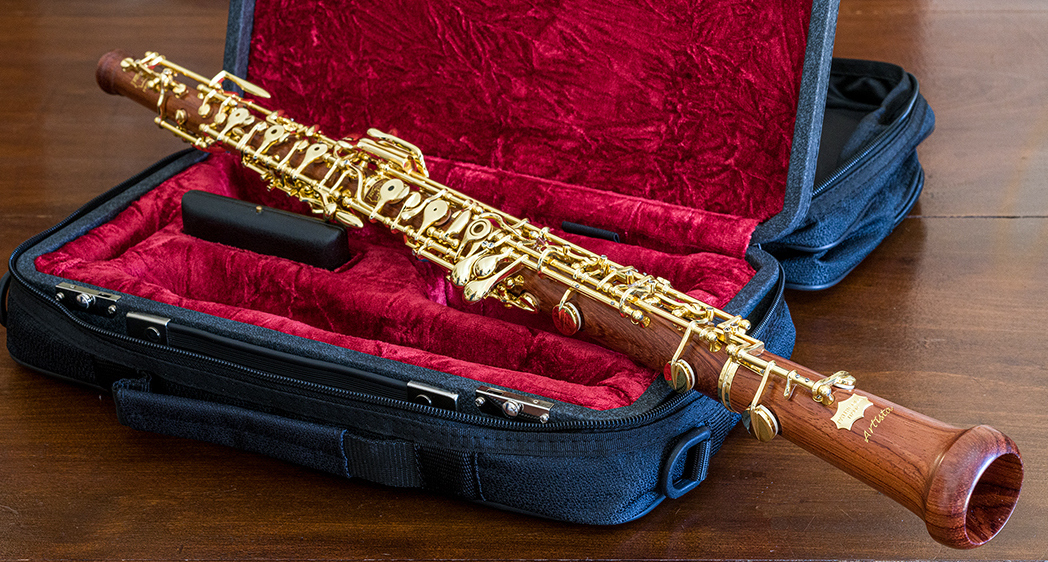
- Oboe Artista
- Genre: instrument makers
- Founded: 1976
- Headquarters: Castelnuovo Scrivia, Italy
- Key people: Francesco, Pietro and Biagio Patricola
- Products: Clarinets (Boehm system), Oboes
- Number of employees: 9
- Website: patricola.com

Fratelli Patricola (Patricola Brothers) is an Italian company producing oboes and clarinets since 1976, based in Castelnuovo Scrivia in the Province of Alessandria.

== History ==
The brothers Francesco, Pietro and Biagio Patricola, woodwind instrument makers, founded their own workshop in 1976 for the production of oboes and clarinets. Two sons and a grandson are also working as instrument builders in the family business.

Fratelli Patricola Clarinets

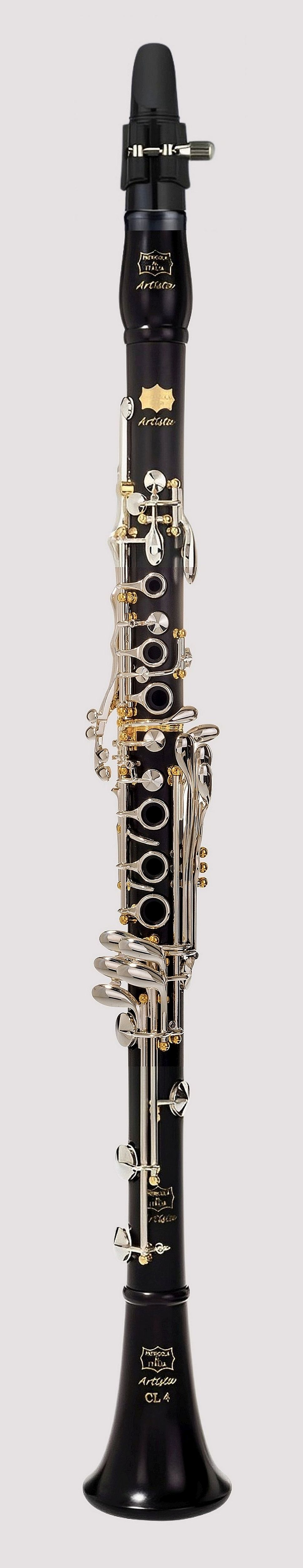
clarinet in B♭ CL.4 (full Boehm)

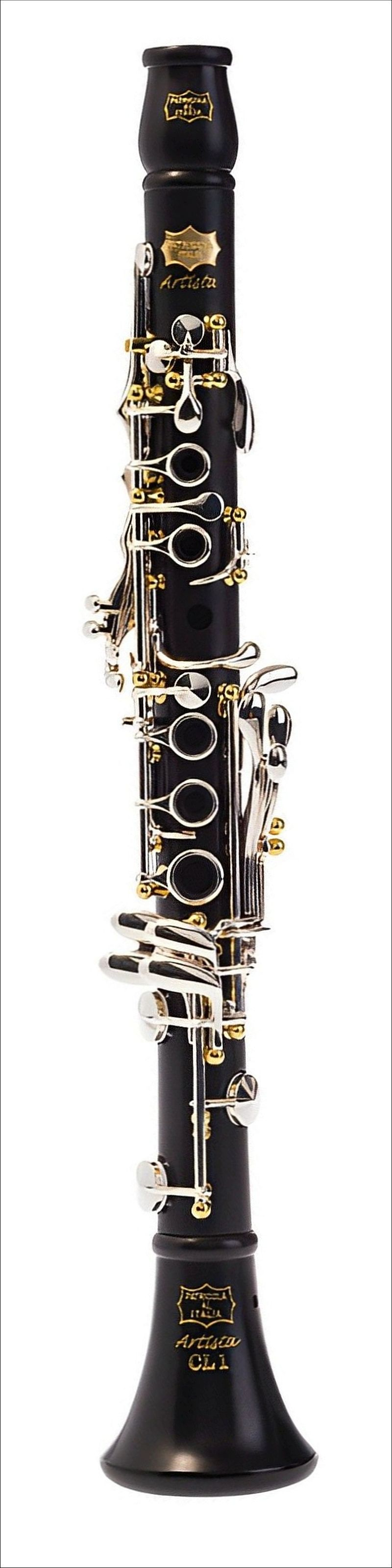
clarinet in E♭ CL.1

== Products ==
Patricola make oboes and clarinets from the woods of Grenadilla (Dalbergia melanoxylon) and Bubinga (Guibourtia tessmannii), aged for up to 12 years, and with silver-plated or optionally gold-plated key work. The woodworking is done with the help of CNC machines, while the hand-made key work is manufactured in-house. About 75% of the manufacturing is done by hand.

Oboes are made in student, semi-professional and professional grades, and the oboe d'amore, cor anglais, and oboe musette in E♭ are also produced. Clarinets are offered as "Virtuoso" semi-professional and "Artista" professional models using the French (Boehm) fingering system in B♭ and A, with options for Full Boehm fingering and a low E♭ key. A clarinet in C and a sopranino in E♭ are also made.

Patricola instruments are distributed globally and played by well-known oboists and clarinetists in orchestras in Italy and throughout the world.
