= Patricola =

Patricola is an Italian surname. Notable people with the surname include:

- Isabella Patricola (1888–1965), known as Miss Patricola, Italian-American singer
- Tom Patricola (1891–1950), Italian-American dancer and actor

== Other uses ==
- Fratelli Patricola, Italian company producing musical instruments
