= Laubin =

Laubin is a surname. Notable people with the surname include:

- Alfred Laubin (1906–1976), American oboist and founder of A. Laubin
- Carl Laubin (born 1947), American-British painter who specializes in architectural painting
- Reginald Laubin (1903–2000), American writer, dancer, and expert on Native American culture and customs
