= Oboe da caccia =

Double reed woodwind instrument

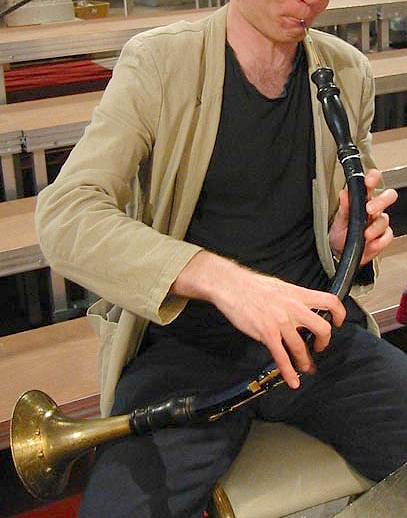
- Oboe da caccia

Woodwind instrument
- Classification: Woodwind; Wind; Double reed
- Hornbostel–Sachs classification: 422.112 (Double-reeded aerophone with keys)
- Developed: Eighteenth century

Related instruments
- Piccolo oboe; Piccolo heckelphone; Oboe; Oboe d'amore; Cor anglais (English horn); Bass oboe; Heckelphone; Lupophon; Contrabass oboe

The oboe da caccia (pronounced [ˈɔːboe da (k)ˈkattʃa]; literally 'hunting oboe' in Italian), also sometimes referred to as an oboe da silva, is a double reed woodwind instrument in the oboe family, pitched a fifth below the oboe and used primarily in the Baroque period of European classical music. It has a curved tube, and in the case of instruments by Eichentopf (and modern copies of same), a brass bell, unusual for an oboe.

Its range is close to that of the cor anglais—that is, from the F below middle C (notated C_{4} but sounding F_{3}) to the D above the treble staff (notated D_{6} but sounding G_{5}). The oboe da caccia is thus a transposing instrument in F. The notated range is identical to that of the soprano baroque oboe, and with a good reed, all registers speak very easily. Johann Sebastian Bach tended to favor the middle and lowest registers, however, perhaps because they are the most characteristic ones for this instrument.

== Development ==
The instrument was likely invented by J.H. Eichentopf of Leipzig, Germany. The first dated reference to the oboe da caccia is 1722, when composer Johann Friedrich Fasch ordered "Waldhautbois" from Leipzig for the court at Zerbst. The first recorded use of the instrument is on 24 June 1723, when the Bach aria BWV 167/3, "Gottes Wort, das trüget nicht", from the cantata Ihr Menschen, rühmet Gottes Liebe, BWV 167, was performed. As Bach had arrived in Leipzig just a month before, it seems hardly possible that he had been involved in developing the new instrument, even if one were to question the identity of the Waldhautbois a year earlier. But Bach was certainly the most prolific and most important composer for oboe da caccia, often using them in pairs. In 1723 alone, Bach wrote four cantatas using this instrument, the others being Schauet doch und sehet, ob irgend ein Schmerz sei, BWV 46, 1 August, Siehe zu, daß deine Gottesfurcht nicht Heuchelei sei, BWV 179, 8 August), and Ich elender Mensch, wer wird mich erlösen, BWV 48, 3 October. Bach wrote extensively for the oboe da caccia in the years 1723–27. There are also significant parts for the oboe da caccia in his Christmas Oratorio (BWV 248, 1734), the Passions (St John Passion, 1724, and St Matthew Passion, c. 1727), and the cantatas.

Other known compositions for the oboe da caccia are by Fasch, Christoph Graupner, and Giovanni Battista Ferrandini. The oboe da caccia was used only in the late Baroque period, after which it fell out of use until interest in authentic performance in the 20th century caused it to be revived.

== Construction ==
The oboe da caccia has a leather-covered wooden body terminating in a large wooden bell, or in the case of Eichentopf's instruments, a flaring brass bell as pictured above. There are typically two brass keys, E♭ and C. The E♭ key is normally doubled for the left hand. There are usually two twin fingerholes, G/A♭ and F/F♯, similar to the soprano baroque oboe. The construction differs from that of practically all other woodwinds. The bore and outward profiles are first created on the lathe, then a series of saw kerfs are made through the bore from the side, which is to become the inner curve. Then the instrument is bent over steam and a slat glued onto the inside curve to fix it. Any remaining lacunae in the kerfs are filled and the curved section is covered with leather. The da caccia is played with a double reed; the sound is very mellow and supple.

The oboe da caccia stands in a rather unusual relationship to the rest of the oboe family. It cannot rightly be called the precursor of the English horn, as it largely developed at the same time as the English horn. The evolution of the English horn is more complex and less straightforward. The da caccia sounds like none of the other members of the oboe family, and no other instrument may legitimately substitute for it—although the English horn is routinely used for this purpose.

== The oboe da caccia after Bach and modern reconstruction ==
After Bach, the oboe da caccia quickly fell out of use. The knowledge of its exact sound and construction was lost, and instruments once believed to be oboes da caccia have proven not to be this instrument at all or to consist only of parts of one. The consensus amongst scholars during the first half of the 20th century was that no known instruments from Bach's time had survived to the present day. Interest in the da caccia was revived in the early 1970s, in part due to the ongoing Teldec Records project to record the complete cantatas of J.S. Bach, conducted by Nikolaus Harnoncourt and Gustav Leonhardt. The taille, a straight two-key oboe pitched in F, had previously been used for the da caccia parts in period-instrument recordings, with mixed results.

It fell to Cary Karp, a curator at the Music Museum in Stockholm, Sweden, to make the discovery that in fact two well-preserved (but unplayable) Eichentopf da caccias existed in museums in Scandinavia: one of them in his own museum, and another in a museum in Copenhagen. Using measurements taken from the two instruments, oboist and instrument maker Paul Hailperin of Zell im Wiesental, Germany, made the first modern-day copies, and these were used in the Harnoncourt recording of the Weihnachtsoratorium that appeared in late 1973.

Modern-day makers of oboes da caccia include Sand Dalton of Lopez Island, Washington, United States; Richard Earle and Tony Millyard in the UK; Marcel Ponseele in Belgium; Henri Gohin in France; and Joel Robinson in New York City.
