= Cor anglais =

Double-reed woodwind instrument

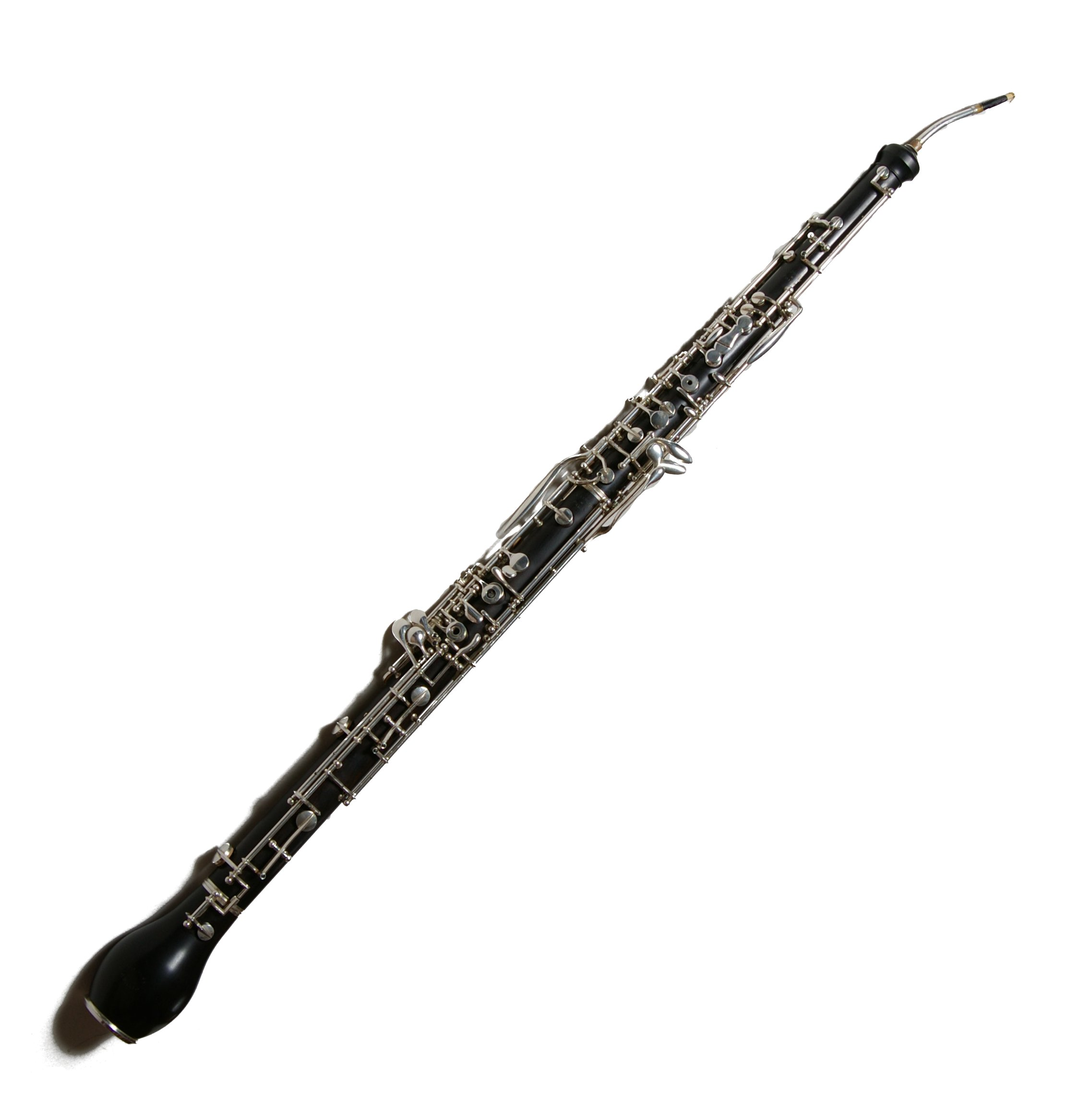

Woodwind instrument
- Classification: Woodwind; Wind; Aerophone
- Hornbostel–Sachs classification: 422.112-71 (Double reed aerophone with keys)
- Developed: about 1720 from the oboe da caccia

Playing range
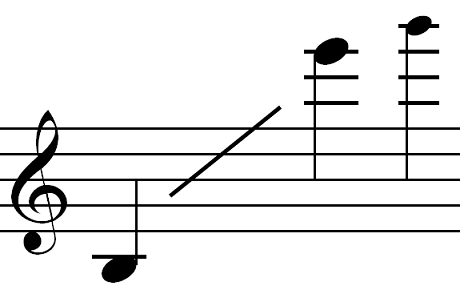
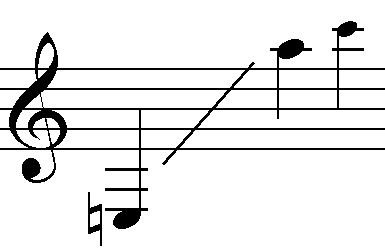
- Written pitch, notated in F, sounds a perfect fifth lower Sounding pitch

Related instruments
- Piccolo oboe; Oboe; Oboe d'amore; Oboe da caccia; Bass oboe; Heckelphone; Lupophon; Contrabass oboe

The cor anglais (UK: /ˌkɔːr ˈɒŋɡleɪ/, US: /- ɑːŋˈɡleɪ/ or original French: [kɔʁ ɑ̃ɡlɛ]; plural: cors anglais), or English horn (mainly North America), is a double-reed woodwind instrument in the oboe family. It is approximately one and a half times the length of an oboe, making it essentially an alto oboe in F.

The cor anglais is a transposing instrument pitched in F, a perfect fifth lower than the oboe (a C instrument). This means that music for the cor anglais is written a perfect fifth higher than the instrument sounds. The fingering and playing technique used for the cor anglais are essentially the same as those of the oboe, and oboists typically double on the cor anglais when required. The cor anglais normally lacks the lowest B♭ key found on most oboes, and so its sounding range stretches from E_{3} (written B♮) below middle C to C_{6} two octaves above middle C. Some versions have a Low B♭ key to extend the range down one more note to sounding E♭_{3.}

== Description and timbre ==
The pear-shaped bell (called Liebesfuß) of the cor anglais gives it a more covered timbre than the oboe, closer in tonal quality to the oboe d'amore. Whereas the oboe is the soprano instrument of the oboe family, the cor anglais is generally regarded as the alto member of the family, and the oboe d'amore—pitched between the two in the key of A—as the mezzo-soprano member. The cor anglais is perceived to have a more mellow and plaintive tone than the oboe. The difference in sound results primarily from a wider reed and a conical bore that expands over a greater distance than the oboe's; although darker in tone and lower in pitch than the oboe, its sound is distinct from (though naturally blends with) the sound of the bassoon family. Its appearance differs from the oboe in that the instrument is notably longer, the reed is attached to a slightly curved metal tube called the bocal, or crook, and the bell has a bulbous shape ("Liebesfuß").

The cor anglais is usually notated in the treble clef, a perfect fifth higher than sounding pitch. Alto clef written at sounding pitch is occasionally used, even by as late a composer as Sergei Prokofiev. In late-18th- and early-19th-century Italy, where the instrument was often played by bassoonists instead of oboists, it was notated in the bass clef an octave below sounding pitch (as found in Rossini's Overture to William Tell). French operatic composers up to Fromental Halévy notated the instrument at sounding pitch in the mezzo-soprano clef, which enabled the player to read the part as if it were in the treble clef.

Although the instrument usually descends only to (written) low B♮, continental instruments with an extension to low B♭ (sounding E♭) have existed since early in the 19th century. Examples of works requiring this note (while acknowledging its exceptional nature) include Arnold Schoenberg's Gurre-Lieder, Gustav Mahler's Das Lied von der Erde, Heitor Villa-Lobos's Chôros No. 6, and Karlheinz Stockhausen's Zeitmaße. Antonín Dvořák, in his Scherzo capriccioso, even writes for the cor anglais down to low A, though it seems unlikely that such an extension ever existed.

Reeds used to play the cor anglais are similar to those used for an oboe, consisting of a piece of cane folded in two. While the cane on an oboe reed is mounted on a small metal tube (the staple) partially covered in cork, there is no such cork on a cor anglais reed, which fits directly on the bocal. The cane part of the reed is wider and longer than that of the oboe. Unlike American-style oboe reeds, cor anglais reeds typically have some wire at the base, approximately 5 mm (0.20 in) from the top of the string used to attach the cane to the staple. This wire serves to hold the two blades of cane together and stabilize tone and pitch.

Perhaps the best-known makers of modern cors anglais are the French firms of F. Lorée, Marigaux, and Rigoutat, the British firm of T. W. Howarth, and the American firm Fox Products. Instruments from smaller makers, such as A. Laubin, are also sought after. Instruments are usually made from African blackwood (aka Grenadilla), although some makers offer instruments in a choice of alternative woods as well, such as cocobolo (Howarth) or violet wood (Lorée), which are said to alter the voice of the cor anglais slightly, producing a more mellow sound. Fox has recently made some instruments in plastic resin and maple, the latter being the wood traditionally used for bassoons.

== History and etymology ==
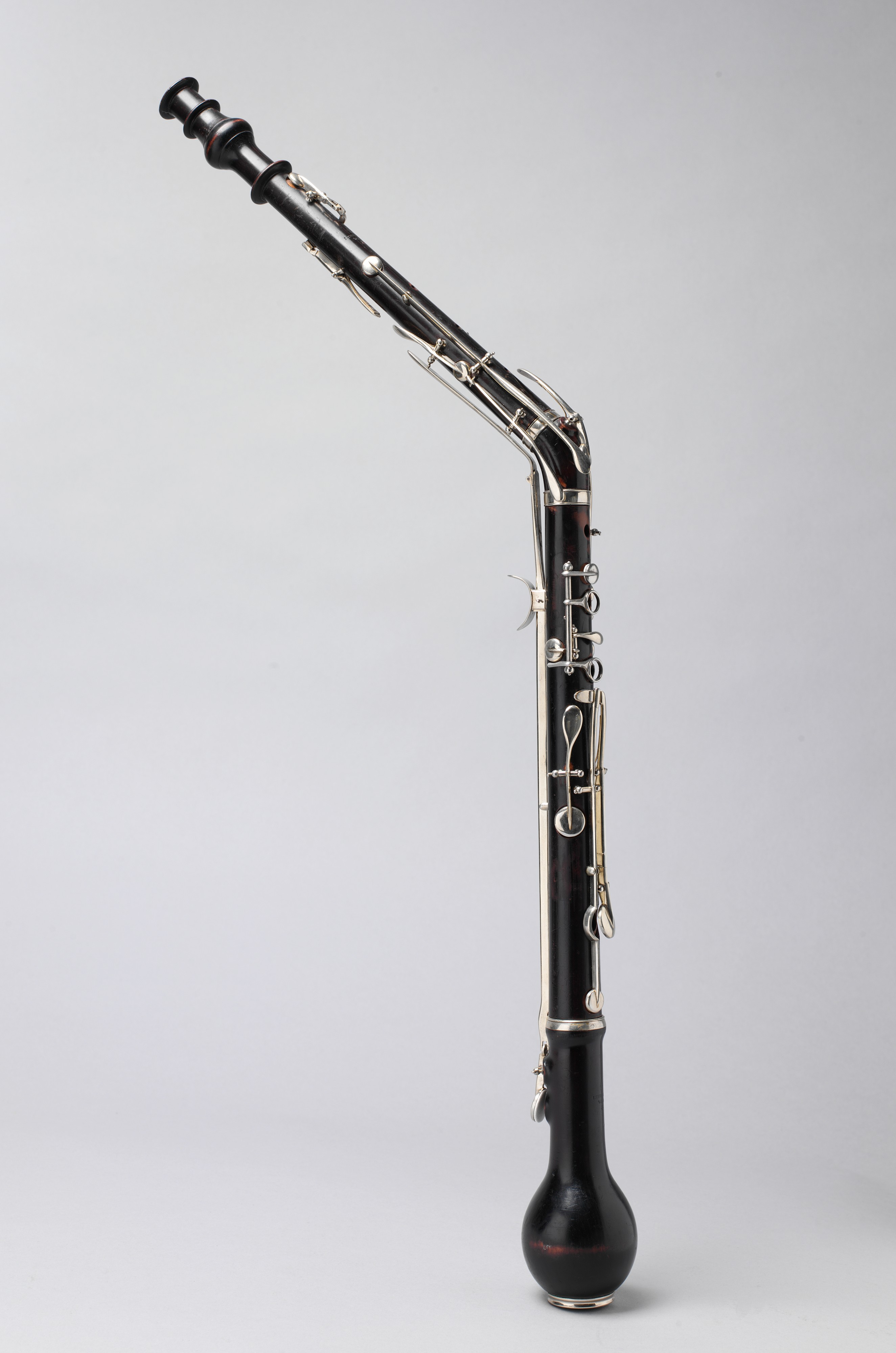
English horn, c. 1860–70

The term cor anglais is French for English horn, but the instrument is neither from England nor related to the various conical-bore brass instruments called "horns", such as the French horn, the natural horn, the post horn, or the tenor horn. The instrument originated in Silesia about 1720 when a bulb bell was fitted to a curved oboe da caccia-type body by the Weigel family of Breslau. The two-keyed, open-belled, straight tenor oboe (French taille de hautbois, "tenor oboe"), and more particularly the flare-belled oboe da caccia, resembled the horns played by angels in religious images of the Middle Ages. This gave rise in German-speaking central Europe to the Middle High German name engellisches Horn, meaning angelic horn. Because engellisch also meant English in the vernacular of the time, the "angelic horn" became the "English horn". In the absence of any better alternative, the curved, bulb-belled tenor oboe then retained the name even after the oboe da caccia fell into disuse around 1760. The name first appeared regularly in Italian, German, and Austrian scores from 1749 on, usually in the Italian form corno inglese.

The earliest known orchestral part specifically for the instrument is in the Vienna version of Niccolò Jommelli's opera Ezio dating from 1749, where it was given the Italian name corno inglese. Gluck and Haydn followed suit in the 1750s, and the first English horn concertos were written in the 1770s. The Schwarzenberg Wind Harmonie of 1771 employed 2 cors anglais as well as 2 oboes, 2 bassoons and 2 horns. Johan Went was first cor anglais and Ignaz Teimer (father of the Teimer brothers) was second cor anglais. The first oboe trios were composed by Johan Went for the Teimer brothers. The oboe and cor anglais writing in these original Bohemian/Viennese trios by Johan Went and Joseph Triebensee are notable as written by oboists for oboists and include some early examples of florid virtuosic writing for the cor anglais, paving the way for similar writing to come. In 1796 Johann and Franz Teimer died. The first recorded performance of an oboe trio was 1793 (which Beethoven attended). While the Teimer brothers performed in Vienna and environs, over 20 oboe trios were composed. Phillip Teimer continued to play the cor anglais in Schikaneder's opera house in Vienna. He also sang some roles with the company due to his sonorous bass voice. Many cor anglais parts were specially written for him by Stengel, Süssmayr, Paer, Winter, Weigl, Eberl, Eybler, Salieri, Hummel, Schacht and Fisher.

Considering the name "cor anglais", it is ironic that the instrument was not regularly used in France before about 1800 or in England before the 1830s. It is mentioned in the Penny Cyclopedia from 1838 as "The English Horn, or Corno Inglese, is a deeper-toned oboe [...]", while the first identified printed use of the term cor anglais in English was in 1870. In the UK the instrument is colloquially generally referred to as the "cor". The local equivalent for "English horn" is used in most other European languages, while a few languages use their equivalent of "alto oboe".

Due to the earlier bowed or angular forms it took, the suggestion has been made that anglais might be a corruption of Middle French anglé (angular, or bent at an angle, angulaire in modern French), but this has been rejected on grounds that there is no evidence of the term cor anglé before it was offered as a possible origin of anglais in the late 19th century.

== Repertoire ==
=== Concertos and concertante ===
Until the 20th century, there were few solo pieces for the instrument with a large ensemble (such as orchestra or concert band). Important examples of such concertos and concertante works are:

- William Alwyn's Autumn Legend for English horn and string orchestra (1954)
- Emmanuel Chabrier's Lamento for English horn and orchestra (1875)
- Aaron Copland's Quiet City for trumpet, English horn, and string orchestra (1940) †
- Miguel del Aguila, Broken Rondo for solo English horn and orchestra
- Gaetano Donizetti's Concertino in G major (1816)
- Arthur Honegger's Concerto da camera for flute, English horn and string orchestra (1948)
- Gordon Jacob's Rhapsody for English horn and strings (1948)
- Aaron Jay Kernis's Colored Field (1994)
- James MacMillan's The World's Ransoming, for obbligato English horn and orchestra (1995–96), part of the orchestral triptych Triduum (1995–97) †
- Walter Piston's Fantasy for English horn, harp and string orchestra (1952)
- Ned Rorem's Concerto for English horn and orchestra (1992)
- Peter Seabourne's Concerto for English horn and orchestra (2013)
- Jean Sibelius' The Swan of Tuonela (1893) †
- Jack Stamp's Elegy for English horn and Band (2004)
- Pēteris Vasks's Concerto for English horn and orchestra (1989)
- Ermanno Wolf-Ferrari's Concertino in A♭, op. 34 (1947)

David Stock's concerto "Oborama" (2010) features the English Horn and its other members as a soloist, the instrument changing in each movement. (ex. Oboe D'amore in movement 3 and Bass Oboe in movement 4)

† Though concertante in nature, these are just orchestral works featuring extensive solos, with the player seated within the orchestra

=== Chamber music ===
Better known chamber music for English horn includes:

- Ludwig van Beethoven's Trio for 2 oboes and English horn, Op. 87 (1795)
- Ludwig van Beethoven's Variations on "Là ci darem la mano", for 2 oboes and English horn, WoO 28 (1796)
- Elliott Carter's Pastoral for English horn and piano (1940)
- Felix Draeseke's "Kleine Suite" for English horn and piano, Op. 87 (1911)
- Paul Hindemith's Sonata for English Horn and Piano (1941)
- Charles Koechlin's Monody for English Horn, Op. 216, Nr. 11 (1947–48)
- Franz Krommer's Trio for 2 oboes and English horn, Trio in F major c.(1794)
- Franz Krommer's Trio for 2 oboes and English horn, Variations on a Theme by Pleyel c.(1794–6)
- Vincent Persichetti's Parable XV for Solo English Horn
- Franz Poessinger's Trio for 2 oboes and English horn, Trio in F major c.(1794–6)
- Anton Reicha's Andante arioso, Andante and Adagio for wind quintet with featured cor anglais (1817-9)
- Karlheinz Stockhausen's Zeitmaße for flute, oboe, clarinet, English horn and bassoon (1955–56)
- Igor Stravinsky's Pastorale for soprano and piano (1907), in the composer's arrangements for soprano, oboe, English horn, clarinet, and bassoon (1923), and violin, oboe, English horn, clarinet, and bassoon (1933)
- Augusta Read Thomas's Pilgrim Soul for cor anglais and two violins (2011)
- Josef Triebensee's Trio for 2 oboes and English horn, Trio in F major c.(1794–6)
- Josef Triebensee's Trio for 2 oboes and English horn, Trio in C major c.(1794–6)
- Josef Triebensee's Trio for 2 oboes and English horn, Trio in Bb major c.(1794–6)
- Josef Triebensee's Trio for 2 oboes and English horn, Variations on a Theme by Haydn c.(1794–6)
- Heitor Villa-Lobos' Quinteto (em forma de chôros) for flute, oboe, clarinet, English horn and bassoon (1928)
- Peter Warlock's 'The Curlew' for singer, flute, cor anglais and string quartet (1920–22)
- Johan Went's Trio for 2 oboes and English horn, Petite Serenade Concertante in F major c.(1790)
- Johan Went's Trio for 2 oboes and English horn, Divertimento in Bb major c.(1790)
- Johan Went's Trio for 2 oboes and English horn, Variations on a Theme by Paisiello c.(1790)
- Johan Went's Trio for 2 oboes and English horn, Variations on a Theme by Haydn c.(1790)
- Johan Went's Trio for 2 oboes and English horn, Pas de Deux in C major de Signore e Signora Vigano c.(1790)
- Anton Wranitsky's Trio for 2 oboes and English horn, Trio in C major c.(1794–6)
- Carlo Yvon's Sonata in F minor for English Horn (or Viola) and Piano (published ca. 1831), one of the few sonatas written during the Romantic era for this combination.

=== Solos in orchestral works and dramas ===
The English horn's timbre makes it well suited to the performance of expressive, melancholic solos in orchestral works (including film scores) as well as operas. Famous examples are:

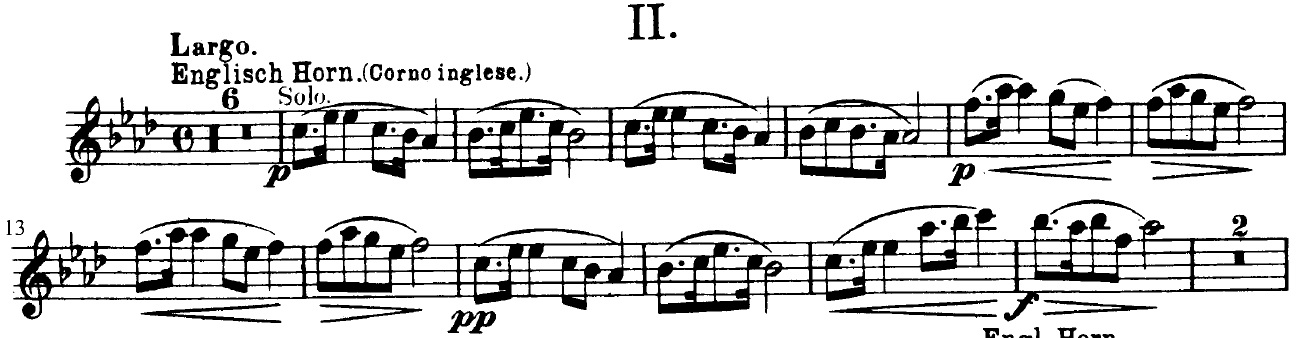
Opening motive from the 2nd movement (Largo) of Dvořák's Symphony No. 9, From the New World

- Vincenzo Bellini's Il Pirata (Act II: Introduzione) (1827)
- Hector Berlioz's Harold in Italy (1834)
- Hector Berlioz's La damnation de Faust: "D'amour l'ardente flamme"
- Hector Berlioz's Rob Roy Overture (1826)
- Hector Berlioz's Roman Carnival Overture (1844)
- Hector Berlioz's Symphonie fantastique (third movement) (1830)
- Alexander Borodin's In the Steppes of Central Asia (1880)
- Alexander Borodin's "Polovetsian Dances" from Prince Igor (1890)
- Emmanuel Chabrier's "Lamento" for orchestra (1875)
- Louis Cole's nothing (2024) ("It All Passes")
- Claude Debussy's Nocturnes (1899) ("Nuages")
- Frederick Delius's Florida Suite (1887)
- Antonín Dvořák's Symphony No. 9 (1893), From the New World (Largo)
- César Franck's Symphony in D minor (1888) (2nd movement)
- Alexander Glazunov's Symphony No. 4 in E-flat major (1893) (1st movement)
- Joseph Haydn's Symphony No. 22, "The Philosopher" (1764) (two English horns)
- Joseph Haydn's Divertimento in F, for two violins, two English horns, two horns & two bassoons Hob. II: 6 (1760)
- Vincent d'Indy's Symphony on a French Mountain Air (1886)
- Zoltán Kodály's Summer Evening (1906)
- Gustav Mahler's "Ich bin der Welt abhanden gekommen" from Rückert-Lieder (1901), "Wenn dein Mütterlein" from Kindertotenlieder (1905)
- Jules Massenet's Le Cid Ballet Suite (Madrilène) (1885)
- Olivier Messiaen's L'ascension (1932–33) (2nd movement)
- Thea Musgrave's Phoenix Rising (1997)
- Basil Poledouris's Conan the Barbarian score – "Riddle of Steel" (1982)
- Amilcare Ponchielli's "Voce di donna" from La Gioconda
- Gaetano Pugnani's Werther Melodrama in Two Parts, (Part II No. 21 Largo assai) (1790)
- Sergei Rachmaninoff's Symphonic Dances (1940)
- Sergei Rachmaninoff's The Bells (1913) (4th movement)
- Maurice Ravel's Piano Concerto in G (1931) (2nd movement)
- Maurice Ravel's Ballet Daphnis et Chloé (1912)
- Maurice Ravel's Le Tombeau de Couperin (1914-1917) All movements but the Fugue and Toccata, later orchestrated by Zoltán Kocsis (1917-1919)
- Maurice Ravel's Rapsodie espagnole (1908)
- Alfred Reed's Russian Christmas Music (1944)
- Ottorino Respighi's Fontane di Roma (1918)
- Ottorino Respighi's Pini di Roma (1924)
- Ottorino Respighi's Lauda per la Natività del Signore (1930)
- Nikolai Rimsky-Korsakov's Capriccio Espagnol (1887) (2nd movement)
- Nikolai Rimsky-Korsakov's Scheherazade Op. 35 (1888)
- Joaquín Rodrigo's Concierto de Aranjuez (1939) (2nd movement)
- Gioachino Rossini's Adelaide di Borgogna, aria: "Soffri la tua sventura…Amica speme"
- Gioachino Rossini's William Tell Overture (1829)
- Antonio Salieri's Annibale in Capua
- Howard Shore's The Lord of the Rings film trilogy (film score)
- Dmitri Shostakovich's Symphony No. 4 in C minor (1936) (1st movement)
- Dmitri Shostakovich's Symphony No. 6 in B minor (1939) (1st movement)
- Dmitri Shostakovich's Symphony No. 8 in C minor (1943) (1st movement)
- Dmitri Shostakovich's Symphony No. 10 in E minor (1953) (3rd movement)
- Dmitri Shostakovich's Symphony No. 11 in G minor (1957) (4th movement)
- Jean Sibelius' Karelia Suite (1893) and Pelléas et Mélisande (1905)
- Robert W. Smith's Symphony No. 2 "The Odyssey" (3rd movement, "The Isle of Calypso")
- Richard Strauss' Ein Heldenleben (1898)
- Igor Stravinsky's The Rite of Spring (1913) Mainly in the Intro to Part I and the next-to-last dance in Part II, Ritual Action of the Ancestors
- Pyotr Ilyich Tchaikovsky's Romeo and Juliet Fantasy Overture (1870) (Love Theme, Exposition)
- Pyotr Ilyich Tchaikovsky's The Nutcracker (1892)
- Ralph Vaughan Williams' In the Fen Country (1904)
- Ralph Vaughan Williams' Symphony No. 2 A London Symphony (2nd movement)
- Ralph Vaughan Williams' Symphony No. 5 in D major (1943) (3rd movement)
- Ralph Vaughan Williams' Symphony No. 6 in E minor (1946–47) (2nd movement)
- Richard Wagner's Tristan und Isolde (1859) (Act 3, Scene 1)
- Ennio Morricone's The Ecstasy of Gold (1966)
- John Williams' Harry Potter and the Philosopher's Stone (film score) (2001)
- John Williams' Schindler's List (film score) (1993)
- Gustav Holst's The Hymn of Jesus (1919) (Prelude)
- Mily Balakirev's arrangement of Frederic Chopin's piano concerto no. 1 in E minor (which he re-orchestrated in 1908-09) has a prominent part for cor anglais as part of its orchestration (where it replaces the second oboe in Chopin's original). This gives his arrangement of the concerto's orchestration a more mellower, resigned tone, especially in the first and second movements.

=== Unaccompanied ===
- Andriessen, Hendrik, Elegia (1967)
- Auerbach, Lera, The Prayer
- Bancquart, A., Sonatine
- Bentzon, J., Rhapsodique Etude, Op. 10
- Berkeley, Michael, Snake (1990)
- Brandon, J., In the City at Night
- Caldini, F., Abendstück, Op. 12
- Caldini, F., Aria di Eliogabalo, Op. 18
- Cantalbiano, R., Sonata
- Carbon, J., Four Impromptus
- Carter, E., A 6-letter Letter
- Cherney, B., Epitaph
- Childs, Barney, Four Involutions
- Dagher, Abdo, The New Egyptian-Arabic
- Davies, Ken, Dark River
- Douglas, Paul Marshall, Luquet
- Downey, John W., Soliloquy
- Filippi, A., Equations
- Hall, Juliana, A Certain Tune
- Head, Raymond, No Nights are Dark Enough
- Isaacson, M., A Quiet Prayer
- Koechlin, Charles, Monodie
- Koechlin, Charles, Suite
- Lawrence, Echoes in Wilderness
- Persichetti, Vincent, Parable XV
- Pfiffner, Miniature d'Umbria I
- Rudin, R., Recitativ und Arie
- Silvestrini, Paysage avec Pyrame eet Thisbe
- Tomasi, H., Evocations
- Turok, P., Partita
