= Alfred Laubin =

- Born: 1906
- Died: September 6, 1976
- Genres: Classical
- Occupations: Oboist, instrument maker
- Instrument: Oboe

Alfred Laubin (1906 – September 6, 1976) was an American oboist and founder of A. Laubin.

Alfred Laubin was born in 1906 in Detroit, where his father Carl was a charter member of that city's orchestra, playing the oboe and the clarinet. His early oboe studies were in Boston with Lenom, DeVergie, and Gillet, who exercised the greatest influence on Laubin to start making oboes.

Laubin played in Boston as an extra with the Boston Symphony Orchestra and at the Esplanade Concerts. He was the first oboe with the Hartford Symphony Orchestra under Leonard Bernstein, the Springfield Symphony Orchestra and the New Jersey Symphony Orchestra. He played second oboe with the Pittsburgh Symphony Orchestra under Fritz Reiner and played the first season, as well as several successive ones, with the New York City Opera Orchestra.
