= Howarth of London =

Musical instrument manufacturer and retailer

Howarth of London is a company specialising in the manufacture and retail of woodwind instruments and associated accessories. The company was formed in 1948 when its first oboe was produced, and continues to produce instruments today. The first oboe, serial number 1001, was purchased by Edward Selwyn, who at the time was principal oboist for the BBC Symphony Orchestra. Today the Howarth XL, the professional model, is played by soloists and orchestral players around the world, including Gordon Hunt, Roy Carter, Richard Woodhams, Elaine Douvas, Martin Schuring and Emily Pailthorpe. The retail shop and repair workshops are based in Chiltern Street, London, whilst the manufacture of instruments takes place in Worthing on the south coast of England. The London shop is divided into three sections: the oboe and bassoon specialists; saxophone and flute specialists; and clarinet specialists.

The company is renowned chiefly for its manufacture of oboes, but it is also a maker of the clarinet, cor anglais and oboe d'amore. It has developed F and G tenoroons (the G instrument is dubbed a "mini-bassoon"), smaller versions of the bassoon, designed for younger players.

Howarth of London sells both thumbplate and conservatoire system oboes. They also sell oboes from other manufacturers such as Loree and Marigaux. The shop sells accessories, sheet music and gifts for all woodwind instruments. It has been the manufacturer of choice among many teachers, students, professionals and amateurs.
