= A. Laubin =

American woodwind instrument maker

- Company type: Private
- Industry: Musical instruments
- Founded: 1931
- Founder: Alfred Laubin
- Headquarters: Peekskill, New York, United States
- Website: www.alaubin.com

A. Laubin, LLC is an American maker of oboes and English horns, formerly located in Peekskill, New York. The first Laubin oboe was made in 1931 by Alfred Laubin, a performing musician who was dissatisfied with the oboes available at the time. Building an oboe began as a home project, cranking a hand-held drill for the bore, and purportedly melting his wife's silverware to create the keys. Soon Mr. Laubin was able to make an instrument which met the demands of his own playing career. He then made more instruments which he demonstrated for other professional oboists, several of whom began playing Laubin oboes during this time. Jack Holmes and Ralph Gomberg of the Boston Symphony were early converts, and many of their students and other players followed. By the mid-1950s, Alfred was making oboes on a full-time basis. In 1956, Alfred's eldest son Paul Laubin joined the business. In 1958, they moved into the Penzel-Mueller factory in Long Island City. With the increased access to workers and machinery, production increased dramatically over the next several years, peaking at over 100 instruments per year by the end of the 1960's.

Paul Laubin (December 14, 1932 – March 1, 2021) took over the business when Alfred died in 1976. He would be the master instrument maker for over four decades. He died March 1, 2021 working in his shop, having made perhaps four instruments in his final year. From 1931 to 2021, approximately 2,050 Laubin oboes were produced. Paul's son Alex Laubin (born 1977) began working in the business in 2003, first doing administrative work, and then expanding into instrument-making. Instrument finisher and repairman David Teitelbaum, who had started at the company in 1974, left in 2016 and moved to Rhode Island (and, in 2025, to Connecticut) where he has his own shop repairing oboes and English horns. Stephen Gara began working at the company part-time around 2011, doing key work and turning wood, and later learning fine woodwork. John Skelton, full-time key maker from 1995 to 2004, returned part-time in 2022.

In August 2022, J. James Phelan (born 1951) purchased the assets of A. Laubin, Inc. from the Laubin family. Mr. Phelan is former co-owner of Burkart-Phelan, Inc., makers of flutes and piccolos in Shirley, Massachusetts. He initially kept the shop in Peekskill, but later moved the new company, A. Laubin LLC, to Holmes, New York, in 2023. The company has hired several new workers since 2023. In 2024, Alex Laubin's association with the company was severed.

In spite of their relative scarcity, Laubin oboes are played by a significant number of highly regarded oboists, including musicians in the New York Philharmonic, the Saint Louis Symphony Orchestra, the Boston Esplanade Pops, and the Montreal Symphony Orchestra.
