= The Warriors (Grainger) =

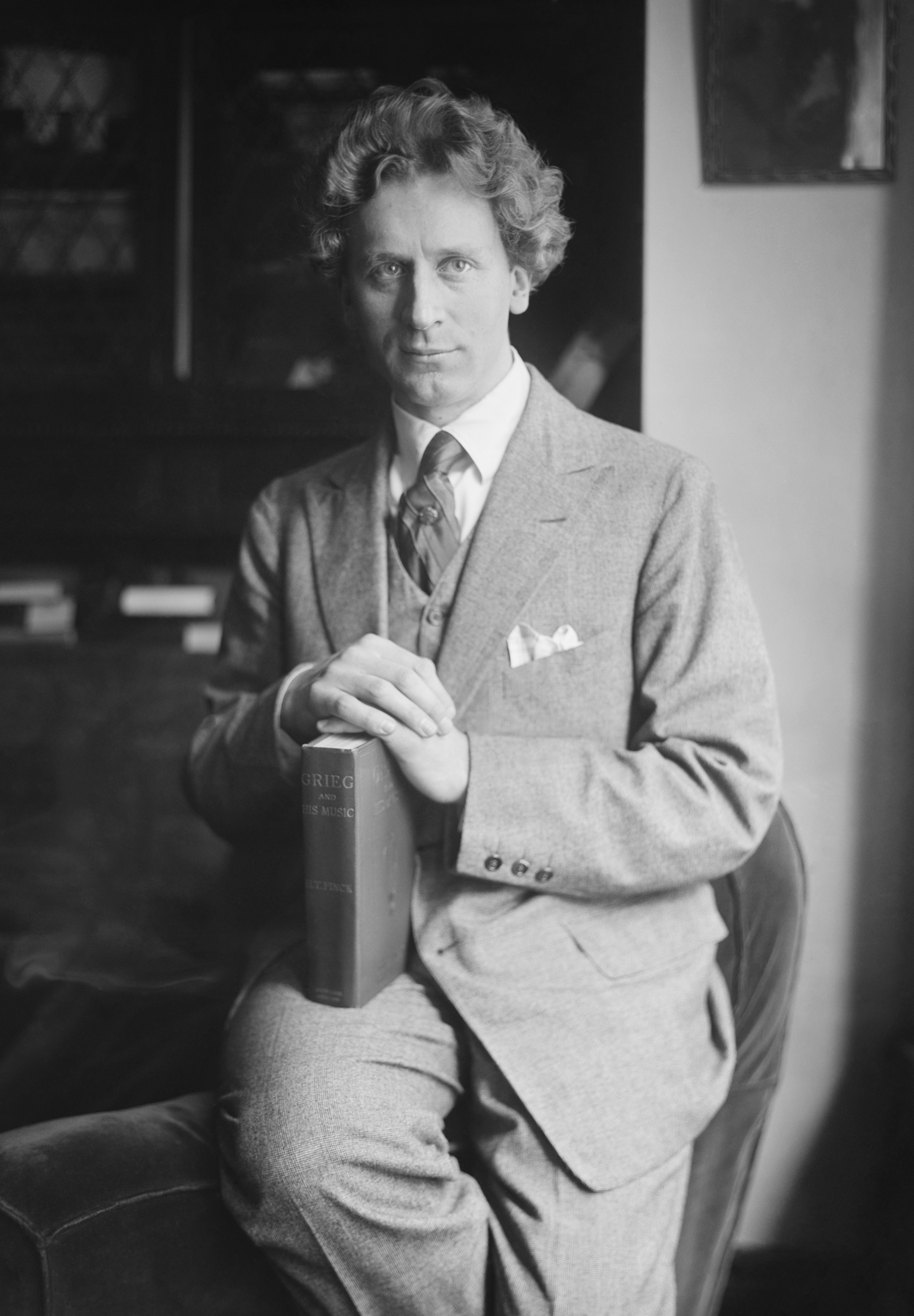
Percy Grainger, c. 1910s

The Warriors: Music to an Imaginary Ballet is an orchestral piece written in the United States by the Australian-born composer and pianist Percy Grainger between 1913 and 1916. It is dedicated "For Frederick Delius, in admiration and affection".

In addition to the usual orchestral forces, it calls for a very large percussion section, including off-stage brass, led by an assistant conductor, and three pianos.

Critics were undecided as to whether the work was “magnificent”, or merely “a magnificent failure”.

== Background ==
In London, on 10 June 1911, Grainger presented Sir Thomas Beecham with the score of his "English Dance" in gratitude following a Queen's Hall concert at which Frederick Delius's cantata A Mass of Life was performed, to Grainger's great delight. In return, Beecham premiered the "English Dance" with his own orchestra at the London Palladium on 18 February 1912. On that occasion Beecham asked Grainger to be his assistant conductor, an invitation Grainger felt unable to accept due to his touring schedule. But Beecham also suggested Grainger write a ballet, to a scenario that Beecham himself would provide, to be performed by Sergei Diaghilev's Ballets Russes when they were next due to appear in London. After waiting almost two years without any scenario forthcoming from Beecham, Grainger decided to make a start in December 1913. He wrote a work for a very large orchestra including three pianos, which could be edited into a danceable form as appropriate to the scenario. Most of the composition took place in London and New York, and he completed it in San Francisco in December 1916. The proposed scenario never did materialise, so Grainger sub-titled the work "Music to an Imaginary Ballet".

In the notes to the published score, Grainger wrote:

No definite program or plot underlies the music, though certain mind-pictures set it going. Often scenes of a ballet have flitted before the eyes of my imagination in which the ghosts of male and female warrior types of all times and places are spirited together for an orgy of warlike dances, processions, and merry-makings, broken or accompanied by amorous interludes; their frolics tinged with just that faint suspicion of wistfulness all holiday gladness wears.

== Structure ==
Grainger notes that there are 15 distinct themes occurring through the 8 sections of the work, played continuously:

1. Fast. Martial or dance-like in character.
2. Slow and langorous.
3. Fast. Begins in the dance spirit but gradually becomes broader and more ‘flowing’ in style.
4. Slow pastoral melody on the bass oboe, accompanied by a tremolo of muted strings and a staccato organ-paint consisting of harp harmonics and piano strings struck by marimba mallets.
5. Slow langorous music (similar to section 2). At the same time, snatches of quick martial music are faintly heard from behind the platform.
6. Dance orgy, beginning gently but working up to a high pitch of commotion and excitement.
7. Climax. The chief theme of the composition is given forth slowly and majestically by the full orchestra.
8. The dance orgy is resumed with vigour, but is broken off suddenly while at its height, whereupon the work ends with an abrupt anticlimax.

The percussion group sometimes plays to different rhythms and tempi from the remainder of the orchestra, which has caused some commentators to describe Grainger as "the Charles Ives of Australia", although others insist a more apt characterisation is that Charles Ives was America's Percy Grainger.

== Instrumentation ==
- Piccolo, 2 flutes, 2 oboes, cor anglais, bass oboe, 2 clarinets, bass clarinet, 2 bassoons, double-bassoon, 6 horns, 4 trumpets, 3 trombones, bass tuba, 4 timpani (1 player), percussion (8 players), celeste, 3 pianos, 2 harps, strings.

== Premiere ==
Grainger himself conducted the first performance at the Norfolk Music Festival, Connecticut, on 7 June 1917.

Some sources state that the world premiere was on 26 December 1919 in a performance by the Chicago Symphony Orchestra under Frederick Stock with Grainger on piano.

The United States West Coast premiere occurred on 9 August 1928, as part of the same concert after which Grainger married the Swedish poet Ella Viola Ström on the stage of the Hollywood Bowl.
