= Piston (music) =

Instrument in the oboe family

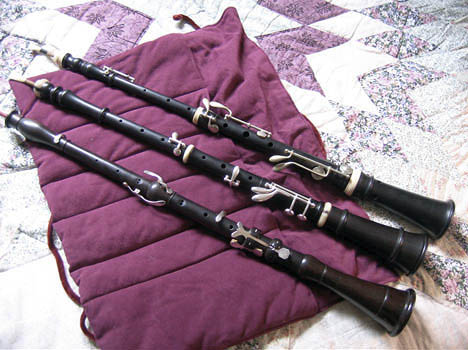
Left: a classical oboe by Harry Vas Dias. Center: a 'piston' oboe by Youenn Le Bihan. Right: a "hautbois rustique" oboe by Hervieux & Glet.

The piston (Breton: pistoñ, English phonetic "pist-on") is a type of oboe invented by Breton musician, teacher, and luthier Youenn Le Bihan in 1983. The pistoñ is a contemporary development of the hautbois, classical and/or baroque oboe, influenced by the bombard or talabard, the traditional double reed instrument of Brittany. It is typically rooted in the key of D and features post-mounted simple system key-work to expand its range. The tone of the pistoñ stands in a warm and rich middle ground between the trumpet-like tone of the bombard and that of the baroque oboe. The bore is similar to that of a baroque or classical oboe.

The pistoñ uses a fairly stiff reed based on cane of an approximate diameter of 12mm, very similar in size to those of the baritone oboe (approximately 9 mm in width at the tip), English horn and baroque oboe. Unlike these other oboes, however, the pistoñ reed's brass staple resembles that of the conservatoire oboe, having a cork outer layer and a cylindrical (as opposed to conical) shape to fit into the reed well of the instrument, therefore requiring neither thread to wrap the staple nor a bocal for it to fit into.

Since its debut by Mr. Le Bihan with groups such as Gwerz and Skolvan, use of the pistoñ has slowly expanded in popularity in traditional groups associated with the "fest noz" dance culture, typically accompanied by instruments such as fiddle, guitar, traverso flute, and accordion. Some other musicians who have recorded with the pistoñ are the group Koun (pistoñ: Josik Allot), Tud (instruments and music by Eric Ollu), and Penn Gollo (pistoñ: Jean-Claude Petit).

Initially Mr. Le Bihan was the only maker of the instrument, and he made them on a very limited basis. Other makers soon filled the void, however, and instruments by makers such as Hervieux & Glet, Jean-Luc Ollivier and Eric Ollu began to fill the pistoñ role as well. Mr. Ollu objects to the use of the term "pistoñ". As he states on his website (translated): "I always call the instrument by its real name; oboe or baroque oboe. I suppose I could call it an Olluphone, tromblophone or some other fantastic name. Why in Brittany and only in Brittany do people call a Baroque oboe a pistoñ? One can only wonder that information available since the fifteenth century has not yet been received! Why give the name of a brass instrument to a woodwind?" (In French, piston occurs as a shortened form of cornet à pistons, the instrument known in English as a cornet.)

While Mr. Ollu markets his instruments as baroque oboes, the pistoñ differs from the baroque or classical oboe in several ways beyond the differences in reeds and keywork mentioned above. Changes in the size and placement of the finger holes have produced changes in the fingerings used to produce the notes F and F#, allowing very rapid passages to be played in E minor without the use of forked fingerings. The pistoñ is also tuned to concert standard A440 tuning rather than a historically-based tuning scheme such as A=415 or 430. Altogether these developments highlight the pistoñ oboe as an evolving instrument intended to play contemporary popular music, rather than recreate music and performance from the remote past.
