= Piccolo heckelphone =

Woodwind instrument

The piccolo heckelphone is a very rare woodwind instrument invented in 1905 by the firm of Wilhelm Heckel in Wiesbaden-Biebrich, Germany. A variant of the heckelphone, the piccolo heckelphone was intended to add power to the very highest woodwind register of the late Romantic orchestra, providing a full and rich oboe-like sound well into the sopranino range. A transposing instrument pitched in F, a perfect fourth above the oboe, its written range is from B3 to E6, though it can reach tones as much as a third above this.

Following the basic principle of the heckelphone, the piccolo heckelphone in F has an extremely wide bore with large tone holes. The angle of the instrument's conicity is quite wide (though not as wide as that of a saxophone), giving it a characteristically strong and powerful tone. The instrument is built in one section with a detachable bell and has simple-system German fingering.

Richard Strauss, who scored for the heckelphone on a number of occasions, was an early enthusiast of the piccolo heckelphone, even using it in a performance of Bach's second Brandenburg Concerto, where it played the solo trumpet part in the final movement. In 1915, Strauss requested that a piccolo heckelphone in E♭ be built for use in his composition Eine Alpensinfonie. Named the terz-heckelphon, Strauss ultimately did not score for it, though a handful were built.

The piccolo heckelphone never became popular, for a number of reasons. Its esoteric name likely did not help matters. Furthermore, with the trend toward economical orchestration following the excesses of the Romantic period, massive sonorities and (by extension) instruments capable of cutting through quadruple wind sections became much less necessary. Finally, the instrument was only ever produced in extremely small numbers, with the last one built in 1955. According to company records, only eight instruments were ever sold.

Altogether, 13 piccolo heckelphones were completed. A further five have remained 'blanks': assigned serial numbers, but not fitted with keys. Two are preserved at the Heckel museum in Biebrich, one is in a museum in Russia, and there is also a piccolo heckelphone at the University of Leipzig's Musical Instrument Museum. Only one is known to be in active use. Of the rest, some may have been lost or destroyed, or may be in the hands of private collectors awaiting discovery.

Despite the extreme rarity of the instrument, there does exist a repertoire, albeit a very small one. In 1971, the German composer Hans-Joachim Hespos composed a trio for piccolo heckelphone, basset-horn, and cello entitled Fahl-Brüchig, which has been performed several times and recorded by German radio. More recently, a number of composers have expressed interest in the instrument and some are writing for it again. A revival appears to be underway.

In recent years, rumors have circulated that Heckel is planning on bringing the piccolo heckelphones in F and E♭ back into production on a limited basis. Were a modern version produced, it could well prove to be a great asset to contemporary composers, providing an alternative to the less powerful piccolo oboe (oboe musette or musette oboe) in F or E♭.
