= Marigaux =

French manufacturer of woodwind instruments

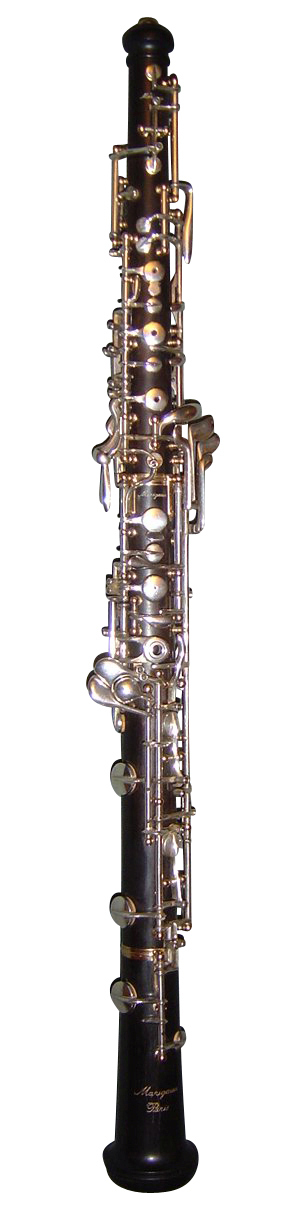
Marigaux Oboe

Marigaux, also known as SML (Strasser-Marigaux-Lemaire) is a French manufacturer of high quality woodwind musical instruments.

Marigaux is considered one of the world's best oboe-makers. The company has made a line of woodwinds that has also included clarinets, saxophones, flutes and bassoons.

== History ==
Strasser Marigaux & Lemaire was founded January 12, 1935 by three partners: Charles Strasser, a businessman who was born in Switzerland; Jules Marigaux, an instrument maker who trained at Buffet-Crampon, where his father was "premier ouvrier," and Lemaire. After the death of Lemaire many years ago, Strasser and Marigaux bought their partner's shares and the company became known as "Strasser-Marigaux." Marigaux died in the early 1970s, leaving Strasser the sole owner of the company. Strasser then sold SML (it continues to use these initials) to a holding company—Strasser-Marigaux S.A..

Strasser Marigaux began its activity in Paris with manufacture of saxophones and flutes. Production of oboes and clarinets was started in a workshop located in la Couture-Boussey, in the Eure department, cradle of French artisan manufacture.

SML ceased production of saxophones in 1982; at the time, the company was making 400 saxes a year. It was also selling saxes to King Musical Instruments, which marketed them under the name,"King Marigaux." A company spokesperson said SML stopped making saxophones because "we just couldn't compete with Selmer anymore" and would "... devote itself entirely to the improvement of the oboe and the clarinet".
