= F. Lorée =

Musical instrument maker in Paris

- Company type: Private
- Industry: Musical instruments
- Founded: 1881; 145 years ago
- Headquarters: Paris, France
- Website: www.loree-paris.com

F. Lorée is a manufacturer of double reed musical instruments based in Paris, France. Lorée produces professional-level instruments in the oboe family under the brand F. Lorée and student-level oboes under the brand Cabart.

F. Lorée was established in 1881 by François Lorée when he left his position as chef d'atelier for the well-established French oboe maker Frédéric Triébert.

The firm of Triébert, which was the dominant oboe-making concern in mid-19th century France, fell to pieces with the death of sole proprietor Frédéric Triébert in 1879. By 1882 it had changed management thrice and was eventually sold to the mass-maker Gautrot, itself purchased in 1884 by Couesnon.

Frédéric Triébert’s last foreman, François Lorée (1835–1902), formed his own oboe making company in 1881, carrying on Triébert’s work and tradition. Acquiring the contract for supplying oboes to the Paris Conservatory in 1882, François Lorée limited his atelier to making oboes and English horns. There is ample reason to believe that the professor of oboe at the Paris Conservatoire, Georges Gillet, encouraged Lorée to set up his own shop. The facts that Lorée acquired the Conservatoire contract before making a single oboe under his own name and that he collaborated with Gillet on the System 6 oboe, suggest such a plan.

Until the mid-20th century, François Lorée was almost without rival as a maker of artist-quality French oboes. In 1906, working with Georges Gillet, François’s son Adolphe Lucien Lorée modified the System 6 oboe to the 6bis (plateau) oboe that is almost universally used today. Even now Lorée remains the dominant French oboe maker. The overwhelming influence of French conservatory-trained oboists in American orchestras of the 1900s led to Lorée’s dominating the American market for most of that century; rare indeed is the American oboist who has not owned a Lorée oboe.

Further details of the Lorée-Triébert relationship are in an article by Robert Howe. The study on Triébert by Tula Giannini, PhD, musicologist, sheds light on his workshop and personal life.
