= Contrabass oboe =

Musical instrument lower than an oboe

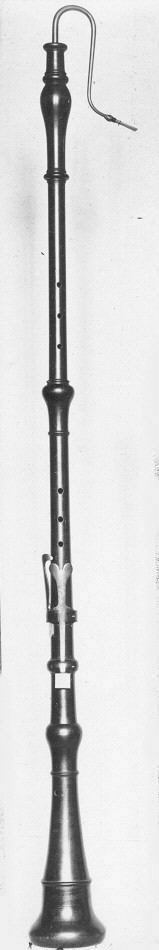
- Contrabass oboe in F, Metropolitan Museum of Art

Woodwind instrument
- Classification: Aerophone; Woodwind; Double reed
- Hornbostel–Sachs classification: 422.112 (Double-reeded aerophone with keys)

Playing range
- Contrabass oboe sounds an octave and a fifth or two octaves below written.

Related instruments
- Oboe; Bass oboe; Heckelphone; Lupophon; Bassoon

The contrabass oboe is a double reed woodwind instrument in the key of C or F, sounding two octaves or an octave and a fifth (respectively) lower than the standard oboe.

Recent research, in particular that by oboe historian Bruce Haynes, suggests that such instruments may have been developed in France as part of an attempt to maintain the complete family of double reed instruments when the oboe was created from the shawm. There was an instrument referred to by H. de Garsault in 1761 as the basse de cromorne or basse de hautbois (Finkelman 2001) which was used by Lully, Charpentier, and other French Baroque composers. This apparently was an oboe-type instrument in the bassoon range. It had, nonetheless, a distinct tonal quality of its own. Richard Strauss states, in his edition of Hector Berlioz's Treatise on Instrumentation, that its tone "...had not the slightest similarity with the low tones of the bassoon" (Berlioz and Strauss 1948, ).

Despite this distinction, the contrabass oboe never became popular or widely used, and few remain today.

== See also ==
- Bass oboe
- Heckelphone
