= List of period instruments =

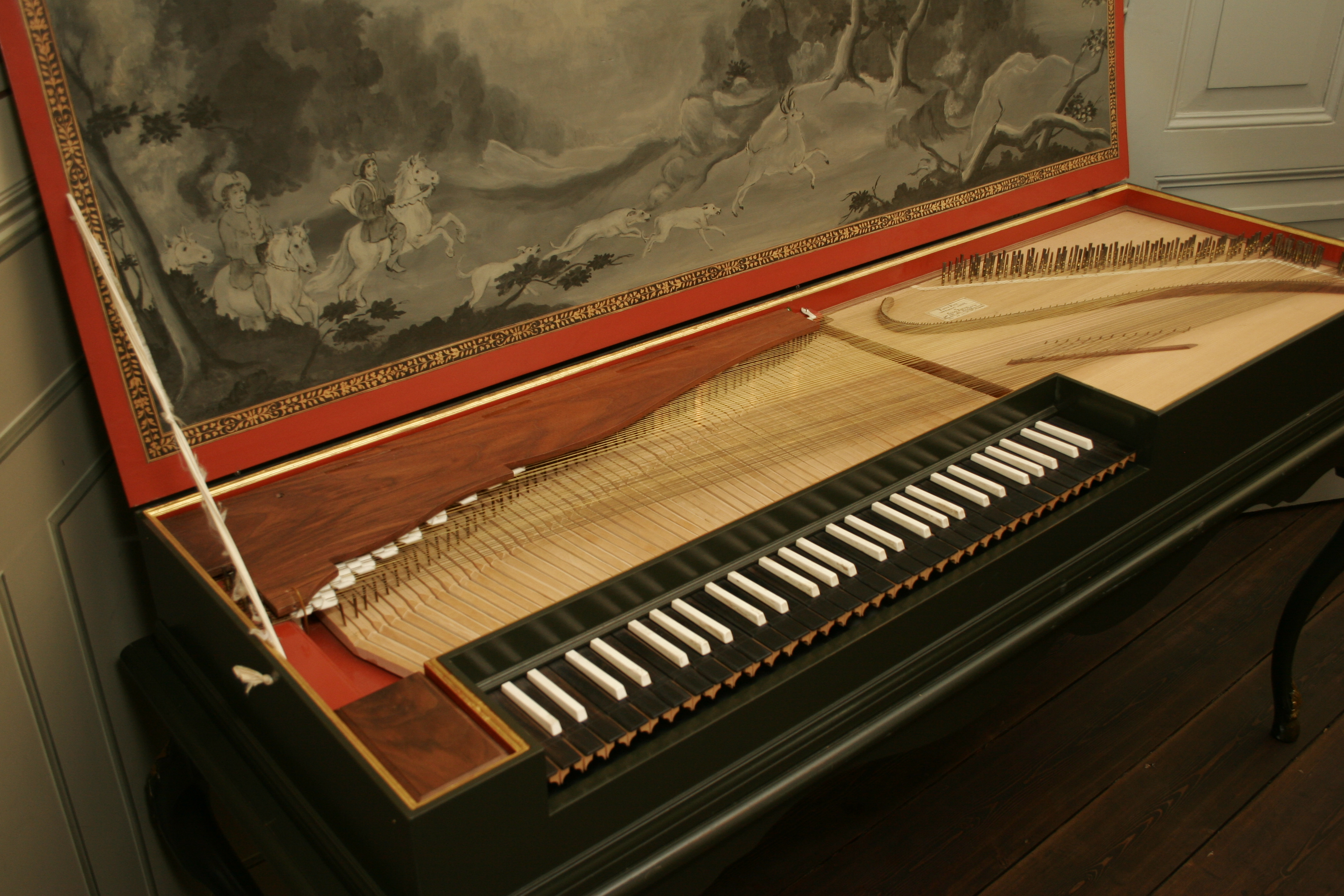
The clavichord is an example of a period instrument.

In the historically informed performance movement, musicians perform classical music using restored or replicated versions of the instruments for which it was originally written. Often performances by such musicians are said to be "on authentic instruments".

This article consists of a list of such instruments in the European tradition, including both instruments that are now obsolete and early versions of instruments that continued to be used in later classical music.

== Renaissance (1400–1600) ==
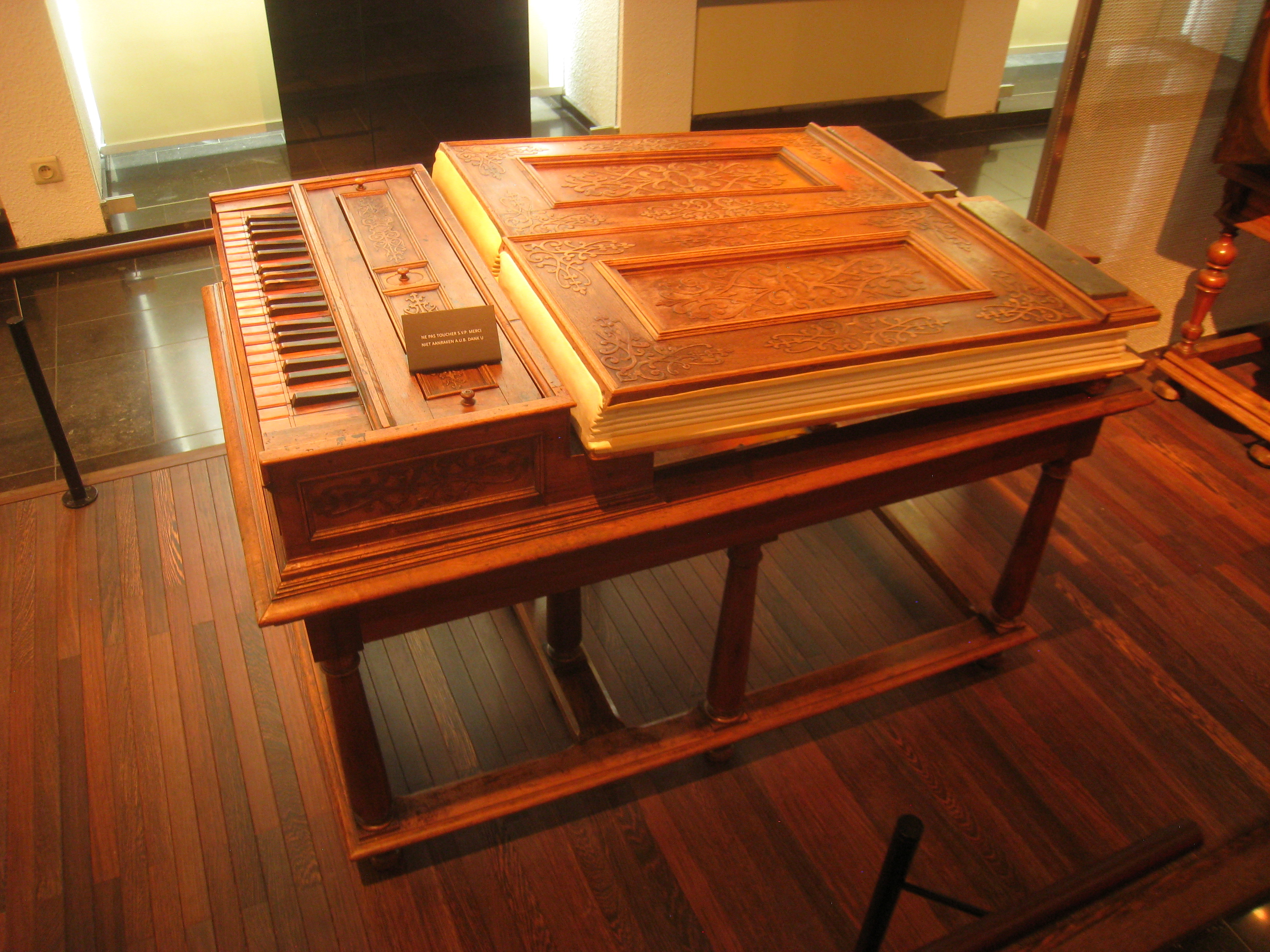
Regal, c. 1600, from Frauenfeld Abbey, Switzerland

=== Strings ===
- Violin
- Viol
- Viola
- Cello
- Lira da braccio
- Contrabass
- Violone
- Lute
- Theorbo
- Archlute
- Gittern
- Mandore
- Harp
- Cittern
- Vihuela

=== Woodwinds ===
- Cornamuse
- Cromorne
- Crumhorn
- Rackett
- Rauschpfeife
- Recorder
- Shawm
- Dulcian

=== Brasses ===
- Trumpet
- Cornett
- Sackbut
- Serpent
- Natural horn
- Slide trumpet
- Natural trumpet
- Horn

=== Keyboards ===
- Clavichord
- Harpsichord
- Regal
- Virginal
- Ottavino
- Organ

=== Percussion ===
- Drum
- Timpani
- Cymbals
- Bass drum
- Tabor

== Baroque (1600–1750) ==
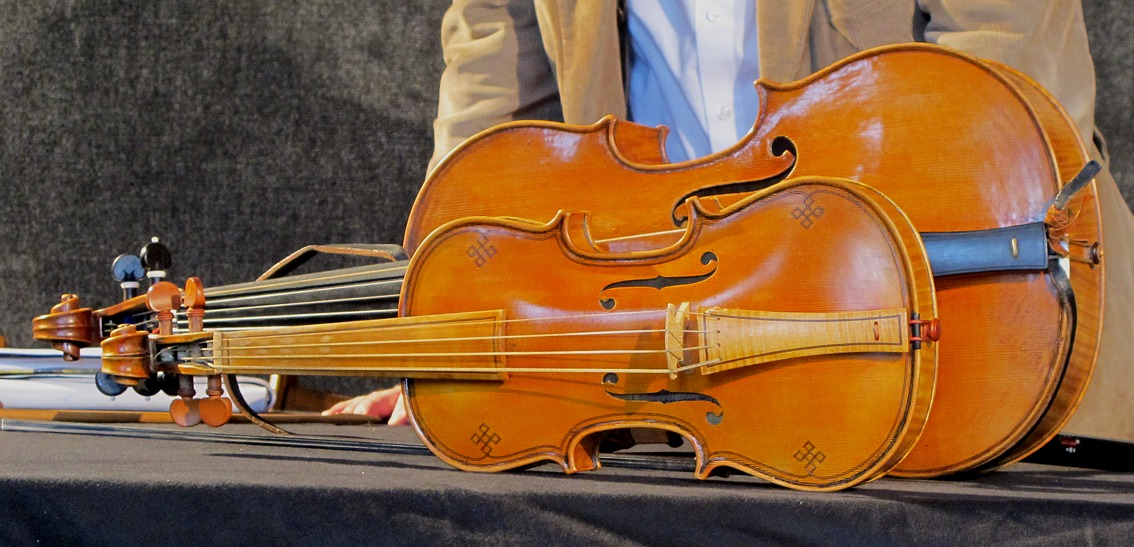
Baroque violin and violoncello da spalla or viola da spalla (cello like instrument often held to chest or shoulder by a strap while playing)

=== Strings ===
- Violino piccolo
- Violin
- Viol
- Viola da gamba
- Viola
- Viola d'amore
- Viola pomposa
- Tenor violin
- Cello
- Violoncello piccolo
- Contrabass
- Colascione
- Violone
- Lute
- Theorbo
- Archlute
- Angélique
- Mandore
- Mandolin
- Baroque guitar
- Harp
- Hurdy-gurdy

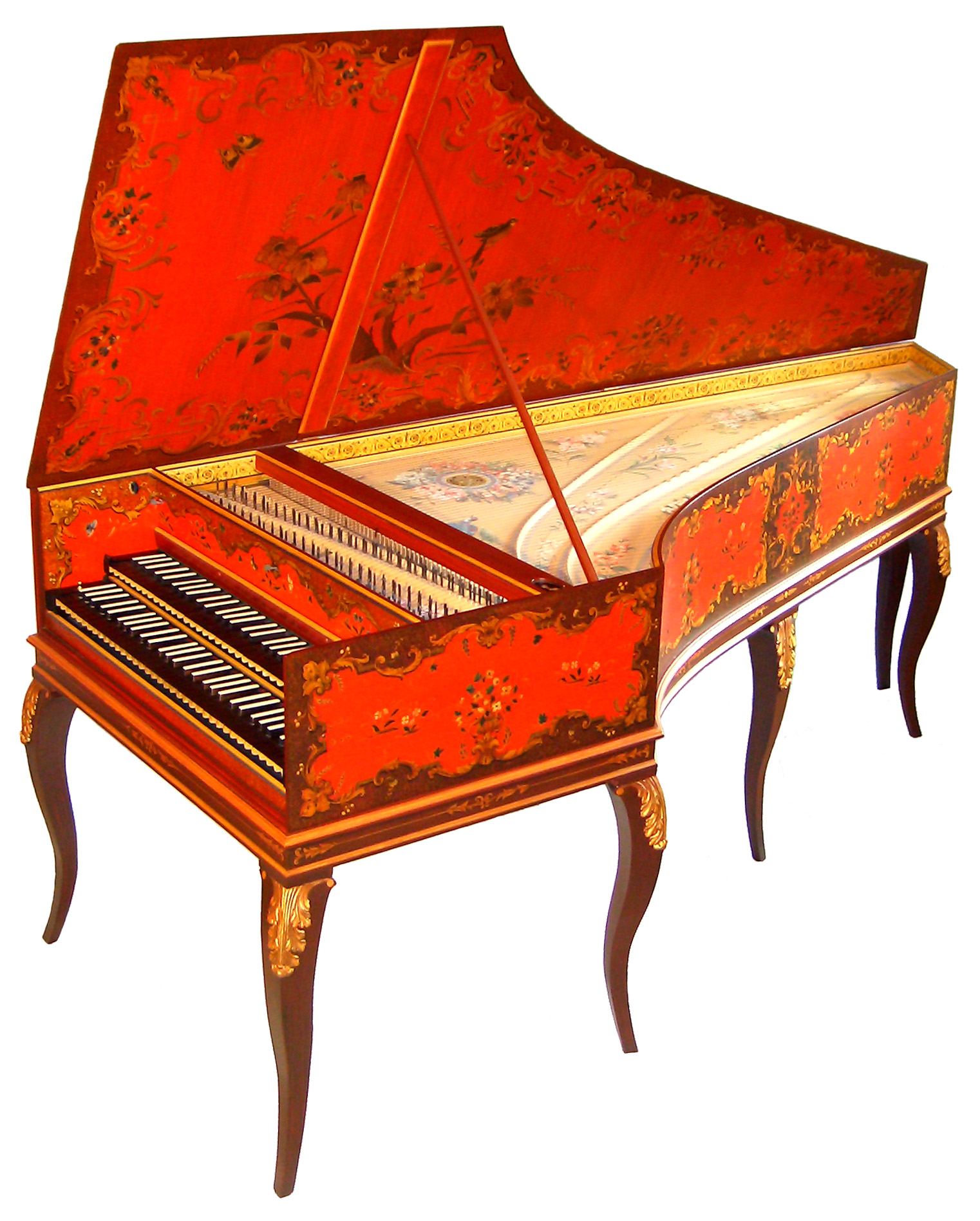
A double-manual harpsichord after Jean-Claude Goujon (1749)

=== Woodwind ===
- Baroque flute
- Chalumeau
- Kortholt (also known as Cortholt, Curtall, Oboe family)
- Dulcian
- Baroque oboe
- Rackett
- Recorder
- Oboe d'amore
- Oboe da caccia
- Contrabassoon
- Taille
- Cor anglais

=== Brasses ===
- Baroque trumpet
- Cornett
- Serpent
- Natural horn
- Slide trumpet
- Post horn
- Natural trumpet
- Horn
- Trombone

=== Keyboards ===
- Clavichord
- Harpsichord
- Spinet
- Organ

=== Percussion ===
- Drum
- Timpani
- Cymbals
- Bass drum
- Tabor
- Snare drum

== Classical (1750–1820) ==
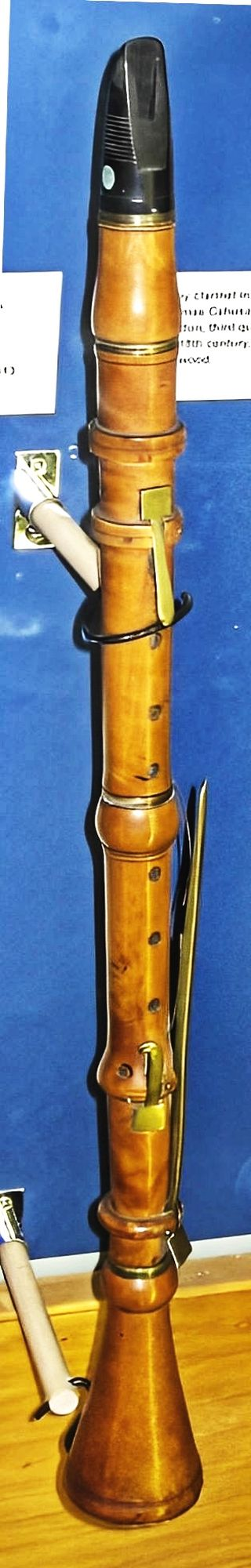
A Classical 4-key boxwood clarinet, ca. 1760

=== Strings ===
- Violin
- Viola
- Cello
- Double bass
- Guitar
- Mandolin

=== Woodwinds ===
- Basset clarinet
- Basset horn
- Clarinette d'amour
- Clarinet
- Chalumeau
- Flute
- Oboe
- Bassoon
- Contrabassoon
- Cor anglais

=== Keyboards ===
- Clavichord
- Harpsichord
- Spinet
- Tangent piano
- Fortepiano (early Piano)
- Organ

=== Brasses ===
- Buccin
- Ophicleide—a Serpent replacement, precursor of the Tuba
- Natural trumpet
- Natural horn
- Trombone
- Post horn

=== Percussion ===
- Drum
- Timpani
- Cymbals
- Bass drum
- Snare drum

== See also ==
- Castrato
- List of European medieval musical instruments
