= Bore (wind instruments) =

Interior channel of a wind instrument

Two instruments distinguished solely by bore

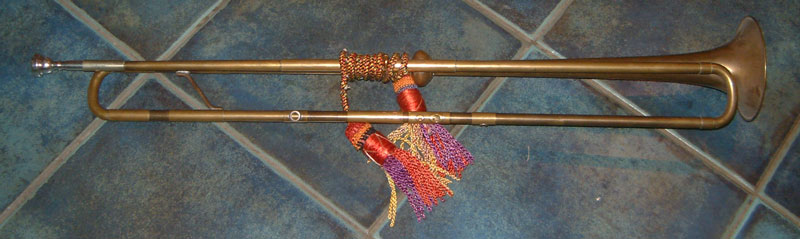
Trumpet: cylindrical

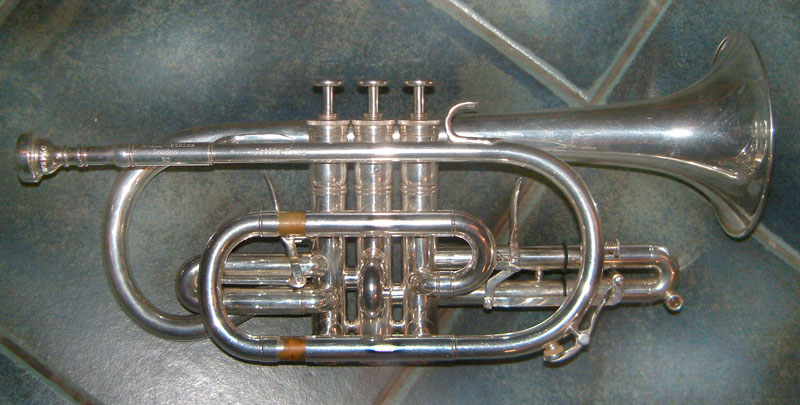
Cornet: conical

Difference may not be visible externally

In music, the bore of a wind instrument (including woodwind and brass) is its interior chamber. This defines a flow path through which air travels, which is set into vibration to produce sounds. The shape of the bore has a strong influence on the instrument's timbre.

== Bore shapes ==
The cone and the cylinder are the two idealized shapes used to describe the bores of wind instruments. Other shapes are not generally used, as they tend to produce dissonant, anharmonic overtones and an unmusical sound. Instruments may consist of a primarily conical or cylindrical tube, but begin in a mouthpiece, and end in a rapidly-expanding "flare" or "bell". This flare reduces the acoustic impedance mismatch between the instrument and the air, allowing the instrument to transmit sound to the air more effectively.

These shapes affect the prominence of harmonics associated with the timbre of the instrument. A bore that flares from the mouthpiece reduces resistance to the breath, while a bore that narrows from the mouth increases it, compared to a cylinder.

=== Cylindrical bore ===
The diameter of a cylindrical bore remains constant along its length. The acoustic behavior depends on whether the instrument is stopped (closed at one end and open at the other), or open (at both ends).

For an open pipe, the wavelength produced by the first normal mode (the fundamental note) is approximately twice the length of the pipe. The wavelength produced by the second normal mode is half that, that is, the length of the pipe, so its pitch is an octave higher; thus an open cylindrical bore instrument overblows at the octave. This corresponds to the second harmonic, and generally the harmonic spectrum of an open cylindrical bore instrument is strong in both even and odd harmonics.

For a stopped pipe, the wavelength produced by the first normal mode is approximately four times the length of the pipe. The wavelength produced by the second normal mode is one third that, i.e. the 4/3 length of the pipe, so its pitch is a twelfth higher; a stopped cylindrical bore instrument overblows at the twelfth. This corresponds to the third harmonic; generally the harmonic spectrum of a stopped cylindrical bore instrument, particularly in its bottom register, is strong in the odd harmonics only.

Modern brass instruments however generally make use of the full length of the instrument for every pitch, and are therefore significantly affected by the effects of the mouthpiece and bell. These modify the instrument's resonances to closely resemble that of a conical pipe, even if the bore is mostly cylindrical.

Instruments having a cylindrical, or mostly cylindrical, bore include:

- Chalumeau
- Clarinet
- Cornamuse
- Crumhorn
- Flute (Boehm system — open)
- Recorder (renaissance and some modern recorders)
- Kortholt
- Rackett (renaissance)
- Trumpet
- Trombone

=== Conical bore ===
The diameter of a conical bore varies linearly with distance from the end of the instrument. A complete conical bore would begin at zero diameter—the cone's vertex. However, actual instrument bores approximate a frustum of a cone. The wavelength produced by the first normal mode is approximately twice the length of the cone measured from the vertex. The wavelength produced by the second normal mode is approximately equal to the length of the cone, so its pitch is an octave higher. Therefore, a conical bore instrument, like one with an open cylindrical bore, overblows at the octave and generally has a harmonic spectrum strong in both even and odd harmonics.

Instruments having a conical, or approximately conical, bore include:

- Alphorn
- Bassoon
- Conch shell
- Cornet
- Dulcian
- Euphonium
- Flugelhorn
- Flute (pre-Boehm)
- French Horn
- Recorder (baroque and most contemporary recorders)
- Oboe
- Rackett (baroque)
- Rauschpfeife
- Saxhorn
- Saxophone
- Shawm
- Trembita
- Tuba
- Uilleann pipes

== Woodwinds ==
Sections of the bores of woodwind instruments deviate from a true cone or a cylinder. For example, although oboes and oboes d'amore are similarly pitched, they have differently shaped terminal bells. Accordingly, the voice of the oboe is described as "piercing" as compared to the more "full" voice of the oboe d'amore.

Although the bore shape of woodwind instruments generally determines their timbre, the instruments' exterior geometry typically has little effect on their voice. In addition, the exterior shape of woodwind instruments may not overtly match the shape of their bores. For example, while oboes and clarinets may outwardly appear similar, oboes have a conical bore while clarinets have a cylindrical bore.

The bore of a baroque recorder has a "reversed" taper, being wider at the head and narrower at the foot of the instrument. Most contemporary recorders also have such a conical bore as they are made very similar to baroque recorders. However, multiple renaissance, medieval and also modern recorders have a cylindrical bore. Some tin flageolets also have a reverse taper.

== Brasses ==
Brass instruments also are sometimes categorized as conical or cylindrical, though most in fact have cylindrical sections between a conical section (the mouthpiece taper or leadpipe) and a non-conical, non-cylindrical flaring section (the bell). Benade gives the following typical proportions:

	Trumpet	Trombone	Horn
Mouthpiece taper	21%	9%	11%
Cylindrical part	29%	52%	61%
Bell	50%	39%	28%

These proportions vary as valves or slides are operated; the above numbers are for instruments with the valves open or the slide fully in. This deviation from standard models of cylindrical and conical tubes means normal mode frequencies of brass instruments do not correspond to integer multiples of the first mode, which is not used for playing. The higher modes however do correspond fairly to integer multiples of a "fictitious fundamental" which can often still be played as a pedal tone. Players of brasses (in contrast to woodwinds) are able to "lip" notes up or down substantially, and on some instruments make use of privileged frequencies (pedal tones and false tones), to obtain in-tune notes outside of the range allowed for by the normal modes.

== See also ==
- Acoustic resonance
- Harmonic series (music)
- Square wave
- Triangle wave
