= Double reed =

Type of reed used to produce sound in various wind instruments

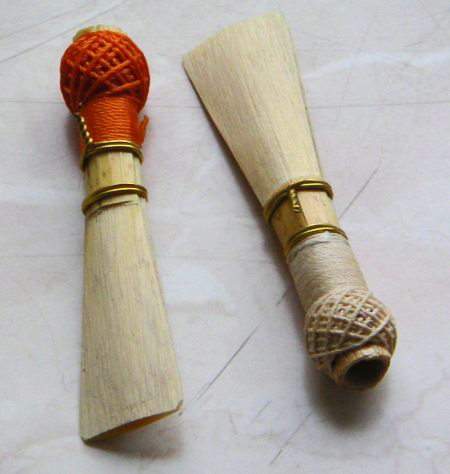
Bassoon reeds, showing the lens-shaped opening (bottom left)

A double reed is a type of reed used to produce sound in various wind instruments. In contrast with a single-reed instrument, where the instrument is played by channeling air against one piece of cane which vibrates against the mouthpiece and creates a sound, a double reed features two pieces of cane vibrating against each other. This means, for instruments with the double reed fully exposed, that the air flow can be controlled by the embouchure from the top, bottom and sides of the reed. The term double reeds can also refer collectively to the class of instruments which use double reeds.

== Structure and dimensions ==
The size and shape of the reed depend on the type of double-reed instrument which is of two groups, conical and cylindrical. Even within families of instruments, for example, the oboe family, the reed for the oboe is quite different from that for the cor anglais (English horn).

Oboe reeds are usually 7 mm (0.3 in) in width, while bassoon reeds are wider, from 13.5 to 15.9 mm (0.53–0.63 in). Since the width of a reed affects its sound and response, reed makers experiment constantly to achieve the results they desire. Reed length, which broadly affects pitch, is much less consistent globally, as different orchestras tune to different frequencies. Auxiliary double reeds such as English horn and contrabassoon have their own sets of measurements, which are subject to the requirements of the player.

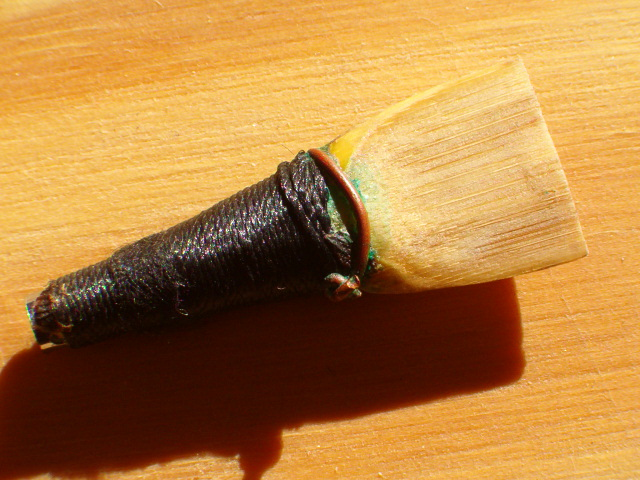
Bagpipe of Portugal reed (gaita transmontana)

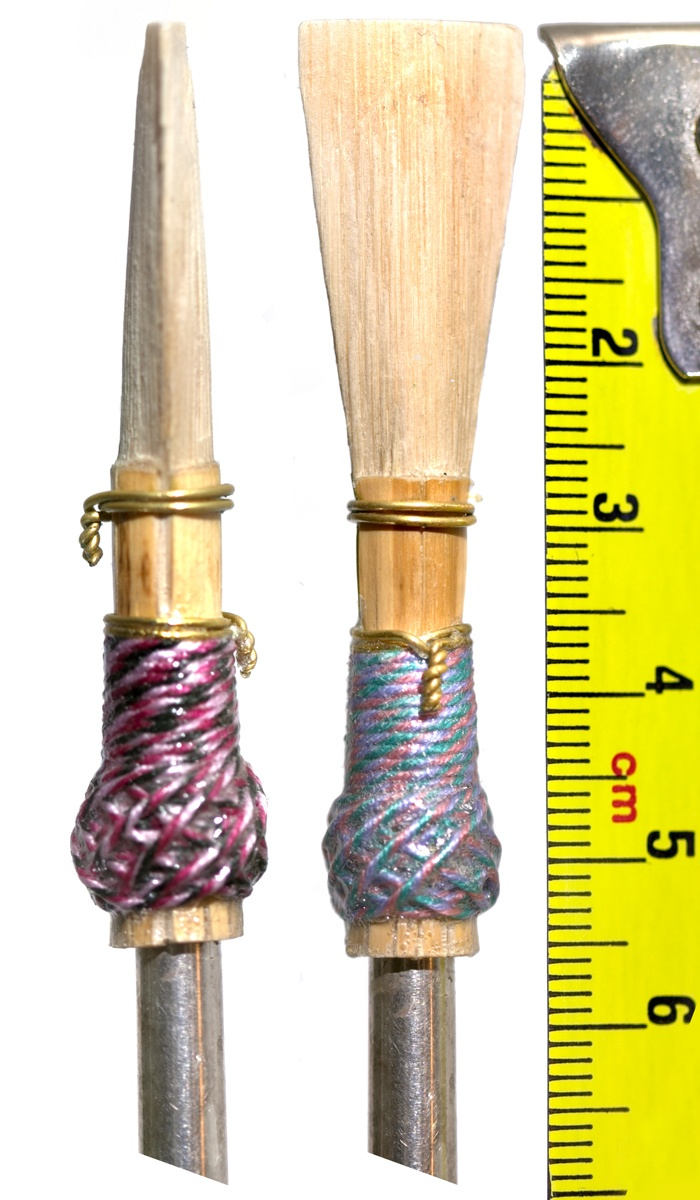
Bassoon reed

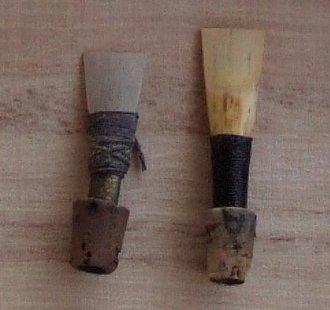
Bombard reed

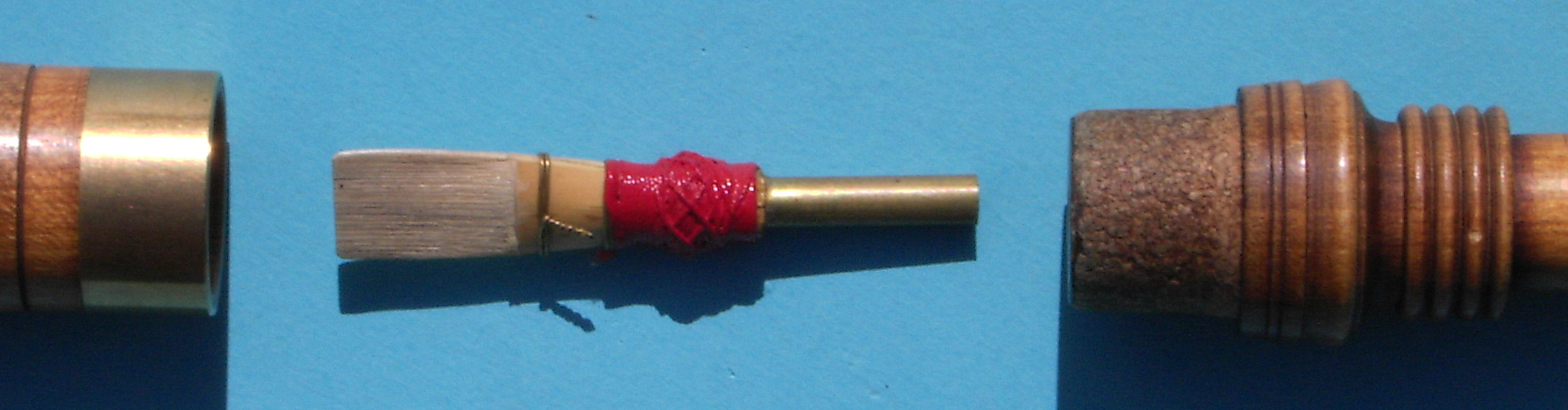
Crumhorn reed

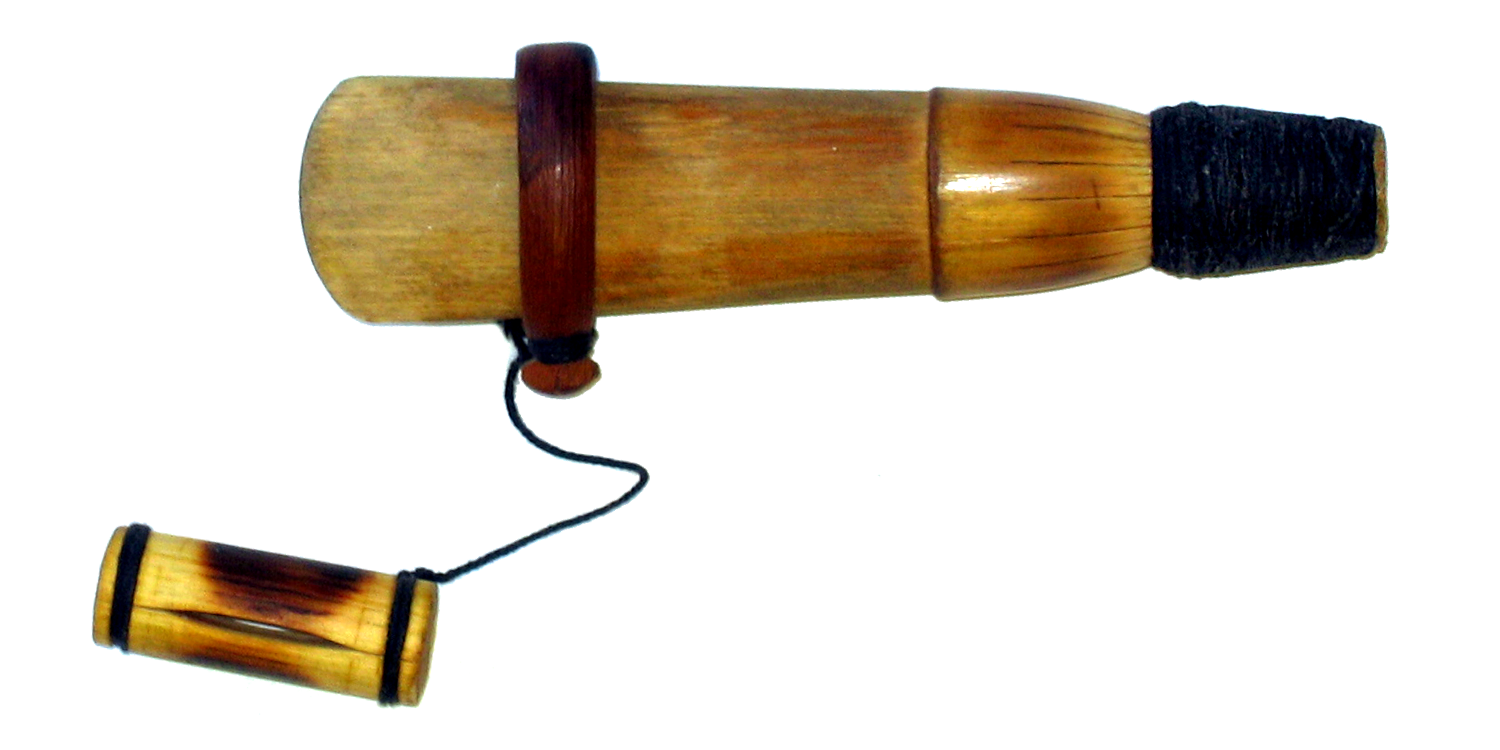
Duduk reed

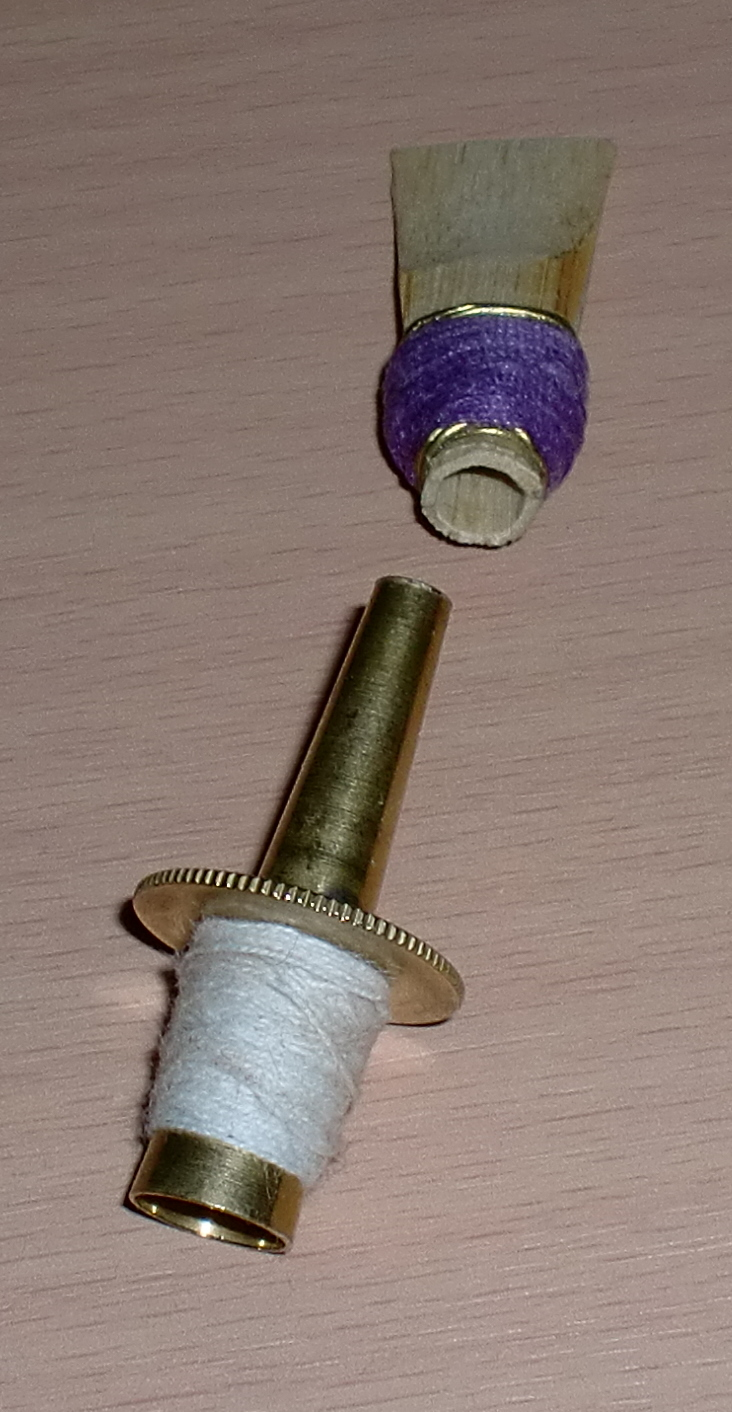
Dulzaina reed

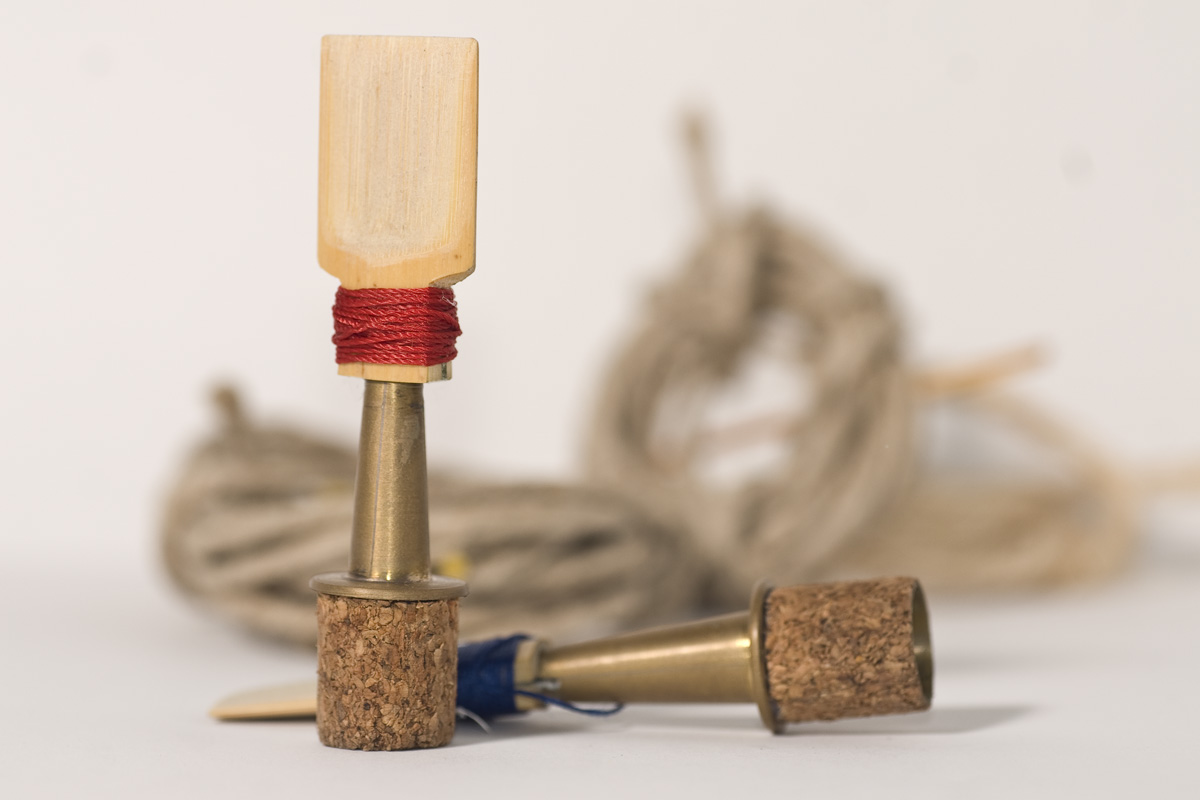
Gralla reed

Oboe reed

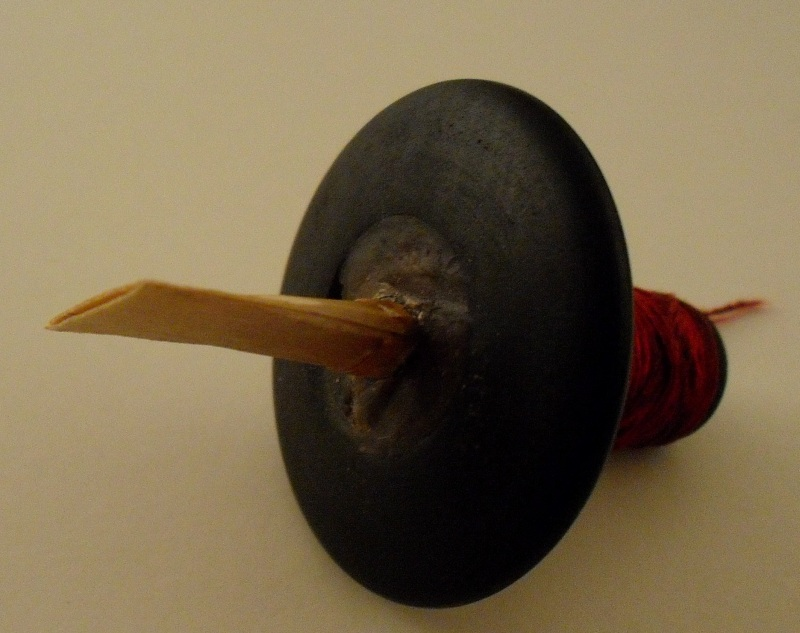
Piffero reed

== Materials ==
For the reeds of European instruments, cane from Arundo donax, a wetland reed species traditionally from southern France, is commonly used. The reeds of non-European instruments can be made from similar wetland grasses, bamboo or young leaves from toddy palm trees. For example, the reed of Japan's hichiriki can be made from either mountain bitter bamboo or Phragmites australis, the latter is a softer cane than Arundo donax. When soft materials are used, adding layers to the reed can increase the stiffness while also maintain suppleness; for example, Myanmar's hne reed can have up to six layers of leaves from the palmyra palm tree which technically transform the double reed into a sextuple reed.

It is also possible to make reeds from synthetic materials such as polypropylene, which tend to last longer because they are less sensitive to temperature and humidity fluctuations. However, since the tone quality is dissimilar to that of a cane reed, synthetic reeds are not favoured by professional musicians.

== Construction ==
A variety of tools are used for splitting, chopping, gouging and shaping the cane in the reed-making process.

=== Example: Bassoon ===
For bassoon reeds, tubes of cane are first split lengthwise then gouged to a certain thickness using a gouging machine. The chosen piece of cane is then cut to shape using a flat shaper and the centre portion is thinned (profiled) using a profiling machine which could be as simple as a wooden dowel and scraping knife to sophisticated machines with planes on a rod and a barrel to hold the cane that has accuracy down to .001" . The cane is folded end to end to form the two blades of the reed. The unprofiled end of the cane is shaped into a tube with the aid of a mandrel and bound with three (or four in some reed making techniques) strategically placed wires. A turban made out of thread is added on the third wire. It provides a hand hold for the reed that is not a sharp wire. The folded tip is cut off to allow the blades to vibrate and final adjustments to the interior of the reed using a reamer to precisely finish the tube to fit the bocal dimensions, and to the exterior (blade) using a reed-scraping knife or tip profiler, are carried out. The reed is then ready to fit to the bocal of the bassoon. The parts of the bassoon reed starting at the tip are: tip, blade, collar (where the profiled cane ends and throat begins), throat, 1st wire, 2nd wire (where throat ends and tube begins), 3rd wire, and butt (where the tube ends).

=== Example: Oboe ===
The construction of double reeds for the oboe family of instruments is similar in principle: like the bassoon's reeds, they consist of two pieces of cane fastened together with an opening at the tip. However, because the oboe does not have a bocal, the cane must be fastened to a metal tube (the staple), the lower half of which is normally surrounded by a piece of cork. The staple is then inserted into the farrow at the upper end of the oboe.

=== Ready-made reeds ===
Players can buy reeds either ready-made, or in various stages of formation, such as part-scraped, reed blanks, or buy the staples and cane separately. Cane is sold in several forms: as tubes, gouged, gouged and shaped, or gouged and shaped and profiled. Bassoon cane has the further option of being profiled before purchase. There are also many options with regard to staples and shaping equipment, which all have a subtle effect on the tone quality a reed will produce.

=== Reed variability ===
Differences in reed construction that may be visually minor can have a substantial impact on the sound produced by the reed, and as a consequence professional double-reed players must exercise meticulous craftsmanship in creating a suitable-sounding reed for whatever repertoire they are playing, with yet further considerations such as whether the player is principal or sectional, or whether the reed will be suitable for every item on the program. Environmental factors such as humidity and temperature also affect the performance of a double reed. Adjustments to reeds are, consequently, very frequent among double-reed musicians.

The reedmaking culture varies between countries, cities, and individuals, and the reedmaker accepts that the life of each reed is extremely short. Among oboists, there are several distinct schools of reedmaking, notatably the American and European schools. American, or "long scrape" reeds feature two visible "windows" of removed cane separated by a central spine, whereas European or "short scrape" reeds typically feature a more homogenous, tapered thickness across the entire reed. The construction of the American reed can help facilitate a "darker" timbre, whereas European reeds may foster a "brighter" sound.

== Playing ==
The orchestral double reeds all employ a similar embouchure. Players pull their lips over their teeth to protect the reed from their teeth, and then vibrate the blades of the reed by blowing, while controlling the timbre and pitch with constant micromuscular pressure adjustments from the muscles of the mouth and jaw. Articulation is achieved by occluding the mouth of the reed with the tongue and then releasing it, with extended techniques such as double tongue, flutter tongue and growl all possible as on the other woodwind families.

The principal difference between double-reed embouchures – both between and within instrument families – is in the positioning of the rolled-in lips, and the musculature employed to control a sound. Oboe reeds, being much longer relative to their width, require concentrated pressure near the tip with more pressure from the sides of the mouth, whereas bassoon reeds are played with lips slightly more pouted and not necessarily aligned vertically. Similarly, the Armenian duduk does not require rolled-in lips and the control of the air flow is distributed toward the lower half of the cheeks.

All double-reed players employ and develop muscles at the back of the mouth to control their intonation via adjustments to the shape and pressure of the oral cavity surrounding the reed.

== Instruments ==
=== Period ===
There are three main groups of instruments based on the methods of playing: blowing directly into the reed, partially blowing into the reed, and not blowing directly into the reed.

Reed fully outside	Reed partially enclosed in a pirouette	Reed enclosed in a windcap
baroque bassoon; baroque oboe; baroque rackett; dulcian; oboe da caccia; sordun	renaissance rackett; shawm	cornamuse; crumhorn; hirtenschalmei; kortholt; musette de cour; rauschpfeife

=== Orchestral ===
Bassoon	Heckelphone	Oboe	Sarrusophone
contraforte; contrabassoon (double bassoon); semi-contrabassoon; tenoroon	piccolo heckelphone	bass oboe; cor anglais (English horn); oboe da caccia; oboe d'amore; piccolo oboe	contrabass sarrusophone

=== Other ===
Instrument	Region(s), best-known for
algaita	West Africa
aulos	Greece
bagpipes	Scotland
balaban	Iran
bombard	Brittany
bishgüür	Mongolia
charumera	Japan
cromorne	France
duduk	Armenia
dulzaina	Spain
fadno	Sámi
gaita transmontana	Portugal
guan	China
gralla	Spain
gyaling	Tibet
hne	Myanmar
hichiriki	Japan
hojok	Korea
kèn (also, kèn bầu)	Vietnam
lupophon	Germany
mey	Turkey
mizmar	Egypt
nadaswaram	India
pey au	Cambodia
piffero or piffaro	Italy
pí tơm	Vietnam
pi nai	Thailand
piri	Korea
pommer	Germany
rhaita	Africa
saronen	Indonesia
selompret	Indonesia
shehnai	India
sralai	Cambodia
sopila	Croatia
sorna	Iran
suona	China
surnay	Middle East
tangmuri	India
tárogató	Hungary, Romania
tenora	Spain
tible	Spain
taepyeongso	Korea
tromboon (trombone with reed)	United States
zurna	Middle East

== Double-reed societies ==
- International Double Reed Society
- British Double Reed Society

== See also ==
- Single reed
- Quadruple reed
