= Cornamuse =

Double reed instrument

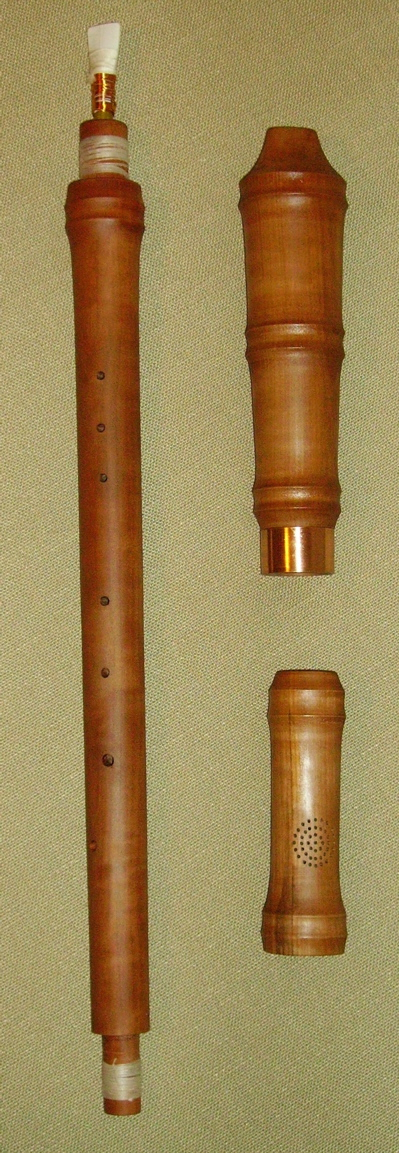
Alto Cornamuse in F, made of pear wood (Reconstruction by Dominik Bauer, Saarbrücken)

The cornamuse is a double reed instrument dating from the Renaissance period. It is similar to the crumhorn in having a windcap over the reed and cylindrical bore. The only evidence for the cornamuse comes from a description and a few comments by Michael Praetorius in Syntagma musicum II, published in 1619. Since the paragraph by Praetorius is the only clear description of the cornamuse and no period specimen or picture has been found, all reconstructions of the instrument rely on a certain amount of conjecture.

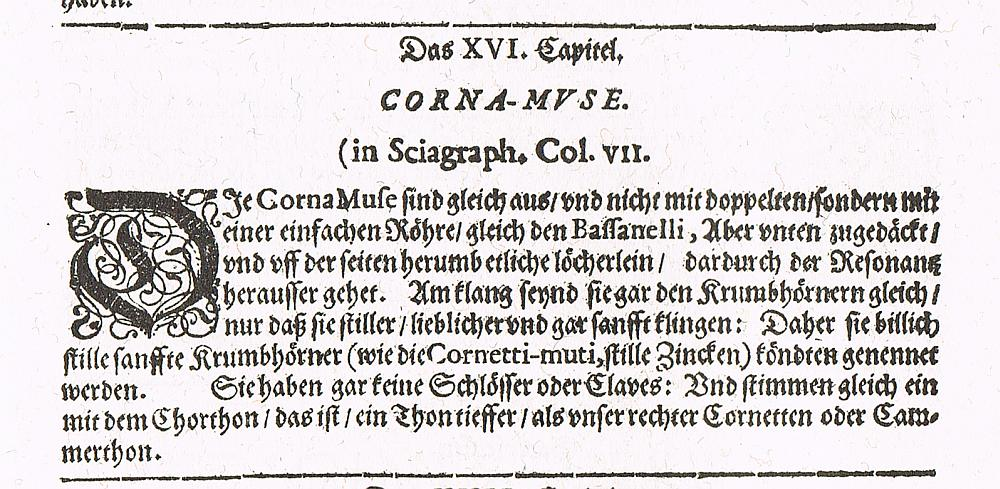
Description of the cornamuse, a Renaissance instrument, by Michael Praetorius

The text in German reads "Die CornaMuse sind gleich aus/und nicht mit doppelten/sondern mit einer einfachen Röhre/gleich den Bassanelli[…] aber unten zugedackt / und uff der seiten herumb etliche löcherlein / dadurch der Resonanz herausser gehet. Am klang seynd sie gar den Krumbhörnern gleich / nur dass sie stiller / lieblicher und gar sanft klingen […]"

(The cornamuse are similar to/and do not have a double, but rather a single tube (bore)/like the bassanelli.) This statement differentiates it from double bore instruments of the period like the sordun, kortholt and curtal. Another clue to its appearance is given in Praetorius' description of the schryari: ("They...are nearly the same as the cornamuse in size and appearance".)

The name is not to be confused with cornemuse, which is the French word for bagpipes.
