= Pommer =

Low-pitched family of woodwind instruments

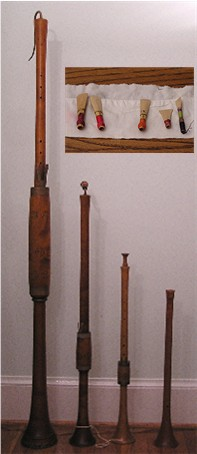
Pommers with reeds

Pommer or bombard (French hautbois; Italian bombardo, bombardone) describes the alto, tenor, bass, and contrabass members of the shawm or Schalmey family. They are similar in function to the modern cor anglais, tenoroon, bassoon, and contrabassoon, although the bassoon family's direct ancestor was the dulcian/curtal family.

== Overview ==
The name "Pommer" arose in Germany, named after artillery, and was large and powerful in tone. The shawm family was the prototypical consort instrument, built in seven sizes from high soprano to great bass, and an ensemble of double reed shawms was capable of producing a grand, full, and balanced sound. These instruments remained popular outdoor instruments and ceremonial instruments up until the development of the more refined and eloquent oboe family by the Philidors and Hotteterres in France during the middle of the 17th century. The cromorne family, not to be confused with the crumhorn, was a sort of transitional instrument that remained in use after the oboe, tenor oboe, and bassoon had been developed.

The main difference to the casual observer between the medieval instruments and those of our orchestra which were evolved from them would be one of size. In the Pommers no attempt had been made to bend the tube, and its length, equal to that of an open organ pipe of the same pitch, was outstretched in all its unwieldiness in an oblique position in front of the performer.

"The great contrabass pommer was 9 ft (2.7 m). long without the crook and reed, which, however, were bent downwards. It had five open fingerholes and five keys working inside a perforated case; in order to bring the holes within reach of the finger, they were cut obliquely through the tube. The compass extended from F below 8 ft (2.4 m). C to E or F in the bass stave, two octaves in all. The other members of the family were the bass Pommer, from 8 ft (2.4 m). C to middle C, corresponding to the modern bassoon or fagotto; the tenor or basset Pommer, a fifth higher in pitch; the alto pommer or nicolo, a fourth or a fifth above the tenor; and the high alto, or Klein Alt Pommer, an octave higher than the tenor, corresponding approximately to the cor-anglais."

== See also ==
- Bombard (music)
- Oboe
- Bassoon
