= Sordino (disambiguation) =

Con sordino is a musical instruction telling a musician to use a mute.

Con sordino can also refer to:

- An instruction for a pianist to use the soft pedal which mutes the instrument
- An instruction for guitarists to dampen the sound using the palm method to slightly deadening the stings
- Sordun, a family of archaic double-reed instruments
- Surdellina or Sordellina, a 17th-century bagpipe
- kit violin, a small string instrument
- Clavichord (from its quiet sound)
