= Dulzaina =

Spanish double-reed instrument

Dulzaina/Dolçaina
- Aragonese dulzaina

Woodwind instrument
- Other names: xirimita
- Classification: Wind; Woodwind; Double reed
- Hornbostel–Sachs classification: 422.112 (Double-reeded aerophone with conical bore)

Related instruments
- Sorna; Rhaita; Suona; Sopila; Zurna

Dulzaina being played

The Muixeranga song (Xavi Richart, valencian dolçaina with tabalet drum).

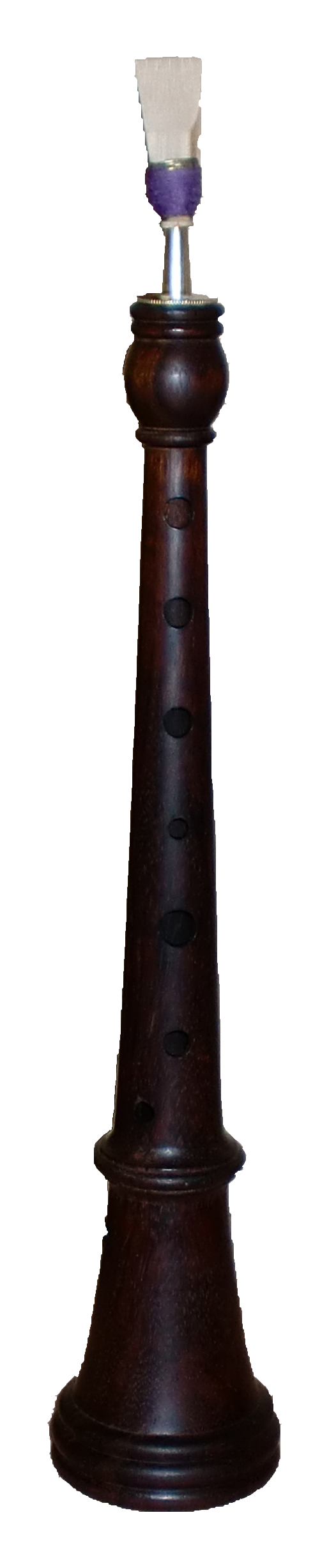
Dolçaina (Valencian Community, Spain).

The dulzaina (Spanish: [dulˈθajna]) is a Spanish double reed instrument in the oboe family. It has a conical shape and is the equivalent of the Breton bombarde. It is often replaced by an oboe or a double reeded clarinet as seen in Armenian and Ukrainian folk music.

Many varieties of the dulzaina exist in Spain. In the Valencian Community, it is known as a dolçaina or xirimita and is accompanied by a drum called the tabalet. The Catalan variety of the dulzaina is called a gralla, and the Basque variety is called a bolin-gozo.

In the region of Aragon, especially in the town of Huesca, the dulzaina is played along with gaitas de boto, regional bagpipes, and sometimes drums. The instrument was first introduced in Spain through Arabic people. The dulzaina is also heard in a large portion of the region of Castilla y León, where it frequently has keys over the holes. The instrument is deeply rooted in the folklore of Burgos, Segovia, Soria, in some areas of Ávila, Madrid, Guadalajara, Toledo, Cuenca, León and Salamanca, less extended in the Basque Autonomous Community and widely used in Navarre and La Rioja.

== Valencian G dolçaina ==
Valencian G dolçaina, otherwise known as dolçaina en sol, is the most typically used dolçaina in Valencia .

=== Range ===
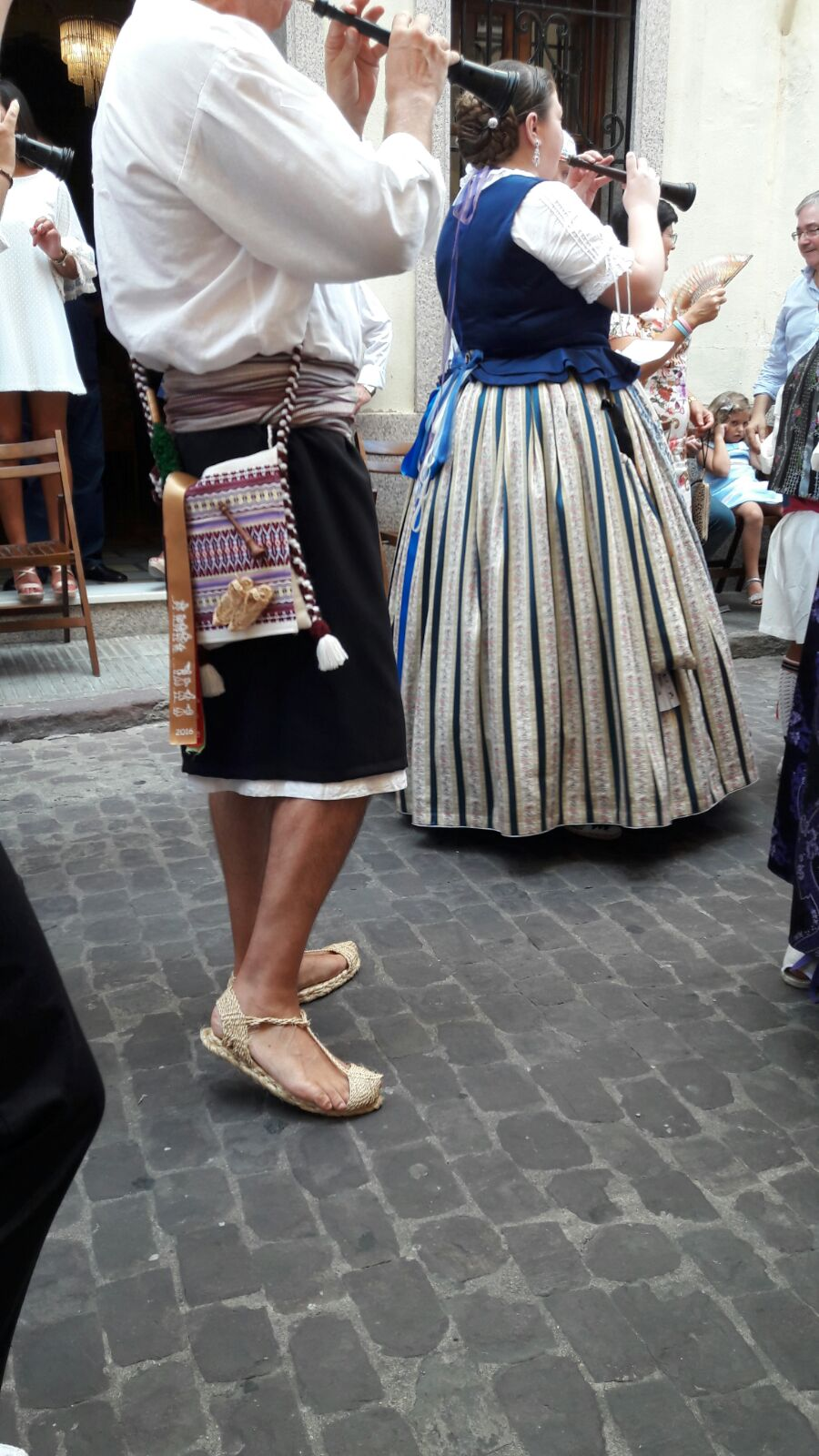
Valencian tabaleters during folk celebration in Algemesi

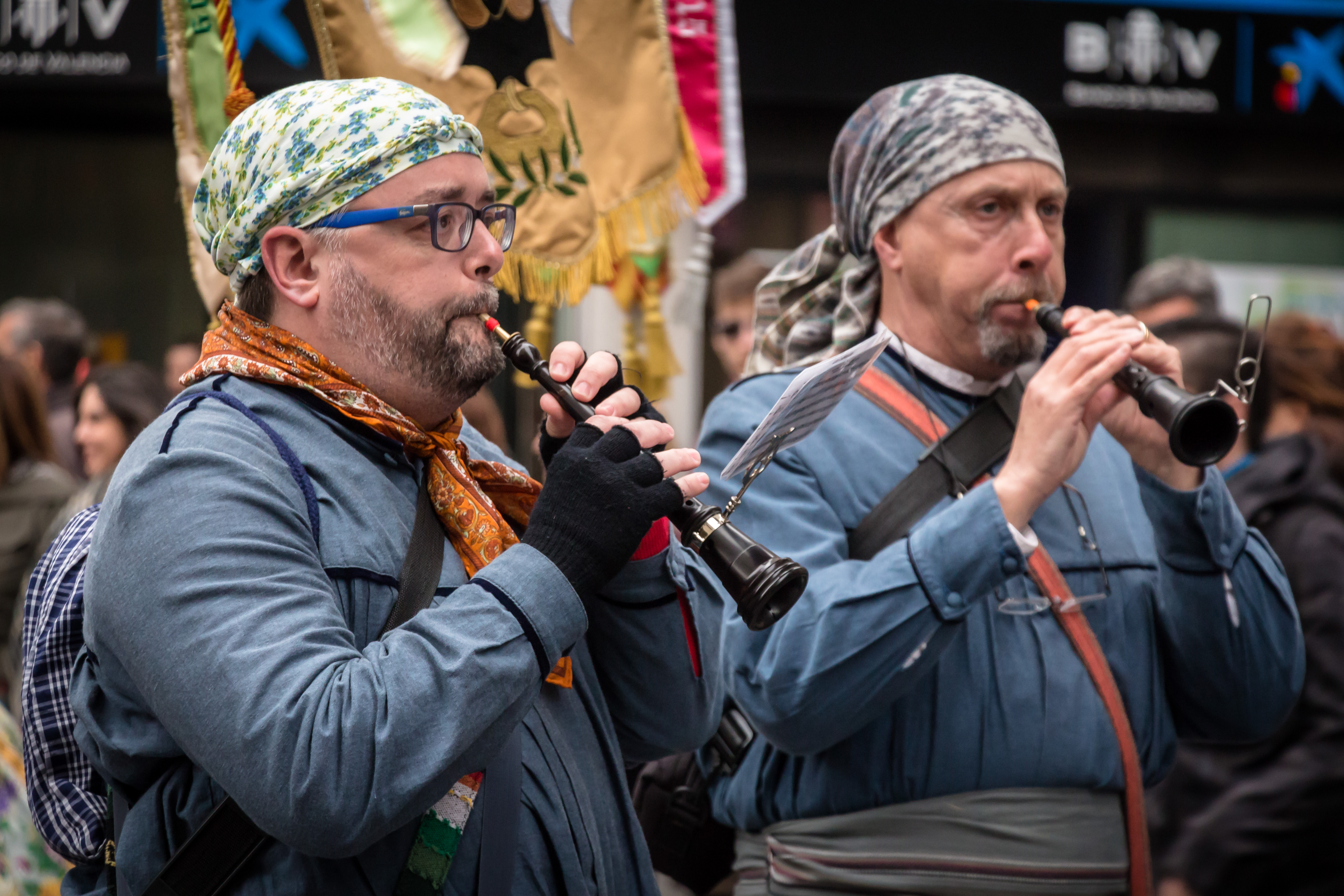
Dolçaines during the Fallas in Valencia

The range in the concert pitch goes from A3 to E5. F#5 may be occasionally used, but it needs to be the next note progression of the scale and it has to be slurred to the previous note.

=== Music reading and writing ===
Music for the dolçaina is always written in treble clef. G-dolçaina (dolçaina en sol) is a transposing instrument and its music is written in treble clef. Scores written for dolçaina should ideally be transposed into treble clef. Therefore, the lowest written note is D4 (the first one below the treble clef staff) and the highest one is A5 (on the first additional line above the treble clef staff).

Unless specifically stated otherwise, in the following sections, when there is a reference to notes or keys, one must think on the ones that are used by dolçaina players (in G) and not to the actual pitch (in C).

=== Acoustics ===
The dolçaina has a penetrating, very powerful sound. Until some years ago, events involving dolçaina were restricted to the streets and squares of many towns and cities. Historically, the dolçaina has played a main role in big gatherings of people during Valencian festivities and traditions, so it is unsurprising that its powerful sound has been specially valued and developed.

Because of its double reed and conical shaped tube, the dolçaina has a sound characteristic of an oboe or a xeremia. However, there are some important differences.

Even though the dolçaina produces a high-pitched sound range, it has a great timbric identity thanks to its richness in harmonics. Under certain acoustic conditions, it can also sound like a soprano saxophone or a trumpet.

Mastering tuning is achieved by fingering and subtle changes in air pressure and in the embouchure. Fingering consists of eight finger holes (7 on the front part and one on the rear part for the thumb; like a recorder).

=== Registers ===
The dolçaina's effective range is divided into two registers, middle register and upper register. They can be distinguished by their timbre and by the way they are produced.

1. Middle register: The sound is natural. It is the most relaxed register. It comprises the first octave, from low D (concert A 3) to high D (concert A 4). Tuning in this register is relatively easy.

2. Upper register: they are the first harmonics of the natural notes. They can be produced by increasing the air pressure - commonly known as "over blowing". Tuning in this register is very hard and playing the notes in it is tiring and difficult. Sustaining playing in this register is truly exhausting. It is situated in the second octave, from high E (concert B4) to high A (concert E5).

=== Accidentals ===
Even though the dolçaina was not originally intended to produce chromaticisms, they can be achieved through a very complex and difficult technique, with obvious timbre and volume differences.

Accidentals which can be easily executed and have a powerful and clear sound are first octave C# and D#.

The rest of them are harder to play and their sound is duller and less powerful. They are: first octave F natural, Bb / A#, G# / Ab and second octave F natural, D# / Eb and G# / Ab.

=== Tonalities ===
The easiest and most used tonalities are G major and D major, since F# and C# can be played naturally. E Minor is also usual, since first octave D# is relatively easy to play.

C major is the most difficult, since natural F cannot be produced naturally and it is considered an accidental in the dolçaina's natural scale. In addition, its lower tonic (lower C) does not exist for dolçaina.

Difficult tonalities: B minor, G minor, A major and A minor.

Very difficult tonalities: E major, D minor, F♯ minor, C♯ minor, F major, Mib major, C minor and B♭ major.

All other tonalities are considered most difficult ones.

=== Dynamics ===
As mentioned above, the dolçaina has a very powerful and penetrating sound – loud (f - forte) playing is common. Getting a louder sound than forte is impossible.

Thanks to modern interpretation techniques, effects of dynamics can be achieved by varying the air pressure and making subtle changes in the embouchure. The diaphragm technique and good breathing practices allow for effective volume control. However, using dynamics is still too hard, as they make tuning more difficult and timbre less powerful. Therefore, the following points must be taken into account in order to make the best of interpretation and expression:

1.Changes of dynamics must not be used in the second register (from high E to high A). These notes are always loud and only difficult techniques allow the player to darken and soften their sound.

2. As opposed to other instruments, decreasing volume level while playing dolçaina implies a huge physical effort in the embouchure and a very difficult and complex technique. This must be kept in mind.

3. Playing quieter than mezzo piano is very difficult, so success cannot be guaranteed below mp.

4. Sudden changes should not be excessive.

=== Articulation ===
Articulation on the dolçaina is really limited compared to other wind instruments. This and other technical issues such as the impossibility of executing double or triple staccato force the player to play slower.

In order to play in faster tempos, the musician has to resort to combinations of slurrings, keeping in mind the difficulty implied by the change of octave, where there is a big break in-between the register, and in many instances it is more or less impossible to maintain an even tone.

One of the dolçaina's special features is the fact that the easiest and most natural way of playing a sound happens when the player tongues both the start and the end of the note, while on other wind instruments it is much easier to play without articulation. Easy articulation for a dolçaina player consists of a firm, well-defined attack. The dolçaina has a strong sound power and other techniques have not been developed simply because they were not needed (need is the mother of all invention).

In spite of these circumstances, techniques for simple attacks and slurs are evolving at a great pace in order to achieve a wider range of nuances in phrasing. The reason for this evolution lies basically in its coexistence with other regularized instruments.

=== Fingering ===
Fingering features are almost the same as any other woodwind keyless instrument. However, at a certain pace, it is complicated to play F natural, Bb/A# and Ab/G# due to their fingering positions, like the recorder (a technique known as cross-fingering).

Register changes must also be taken into account, since dolçaina has neither keys nor finger locations to octave change, hence the player has to resort to air pressure and embouchure pressure (harmonics).

=== Endurance ===
The dolçaina is a musical instrument that quickly tires its players both physically and psychologically, much faster than brass instruments. The reason for this lies with some of its features:

Being a short-length instrument, it offers little resistance to air flow and therefore requires great pressure and a strong airflow.

The reed used on the dolçaina is among the biggest and most resistant in the oboe family, meaning that great pressure must be applied so as to manipulate the sound.

However, endurance may increase progressively if the piece features fewer high-pitched notes, more breaths, empty bars and less dynamics. Difficult accidentals should be avoided as much as possible.
