= Prattica Terza =

Prattica Terza is a chamber musical ensemble playing Baroque music on period instruments. It was founded in 2007 by young musicians in Saint Petersburg, Russia.
