= Rackett =

Renaissance predecessor of the bassoon

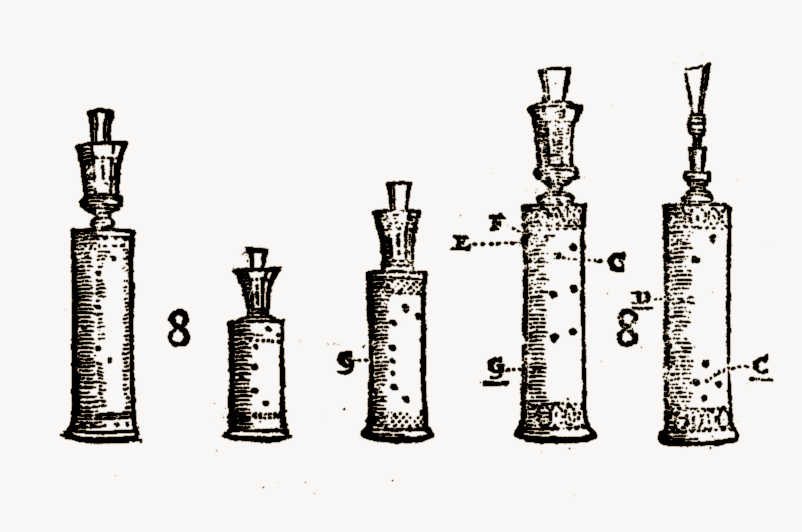
Racketts, from Michael Praetorius' Syntagma Musicum Theatrum Instrumentorum seu Sciagraphia (1619)

The rackett, raggett, cervelas, or sausage bassoon is a Renaissance-era double reed wind instrument, introduced late in the sixteenth century and already superseded by bassoons at the end of the seventeenth century.

== Description ==
There are four sizes of rackett, in a family ranging from descant (soprano), tenor-alto, bass to great bass. Relative to their pitch, racketts are quite small (the descant rackett is only 4½ inches long, yet its lowest note is G2). This is achieved through its ingenious construction; the body consists of a solid wooden cylinder into which nine parallel bores are drilled. These are connected alternately at the top and bottom, resulting in a long, cylindrical wind passage within a compact body so that one can carry in one's pocket an instrument that will descend as low in pitch as a modern bassoon.

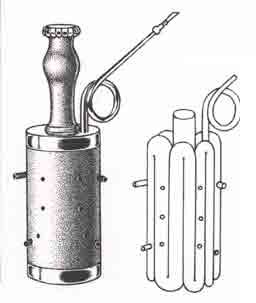
Baroque rackett: outside (left) and inside (right)

However, its unusual construction requires its fingering to be somewhat different from other period woodwinds; it is similar to the front seven holes of the crumhorn and blends well with recorders and krumhorns, but with the hands placed side by side. Additional holes are covered by the thumbs and second joint of the index finger in order to extend the range a perfect fourth below the nominal scale, like the curtal. Thus the descant rackett is considered to be in C, but its range covers a perfect twelfth from d' to G. The ranges for the rest of the family as given by Praetorius are: tenor alt: g to C; bass: c to FF; great bass: A to DD or G to CC. The range could be extended upward by several more notes since the Renaissance rackett overblows at the twelfth like a clarinet. Praetorius writes in Syntagma Musicum II: "if a rackett is well drilled and is played by a good musician, it then can be made to produce a few more tones." The three extant renaissance racketts are housed in two European collections; one is in the Musikinstrumenten Museum in Leipzig, and two are in the Kunsthistorisches Museum in Vienna.

Renaissance racketts surround the reed with an openwork cylindrical pirouette; Baroque ones are closed-in, with a bocal.

The baroque rackett (developed by the Nuremberg maker Johann Christoph Denner) combined the folded bore concept with a conical (or pseudo-conical) bore profile; in essence, it is a bassoon in rackett form. It has ten parallel cylindrical bores whose diameters increase in succession to function as a true conical bore and allow overblowing at the octave. A number of tetines were added, which are tubular metal extensions covered by the middle joint of the index fingers as well as the pinkies. Condensation usually remains in the coil of the removable brass crook, thus it is fairly simple to expel during pauses. Despite its idiosyncrasies, the baroque rackett is a versatile instrument with a wide range of notes and dynamics. With an appropriate reed, the baroque rackett has a similar chromatic range to the baroque bassoon (g' to BB♭), and with its agility, can perform most bass-instrument repertoire from the time in which it was in vogue. Extant specimens of the baroque rackett can be found in the Musikinstrumenten-Museum Berlin, the Rijksmuseum in Amsterdam and the Bayerisches Nationalmuseum in Munich.

== Origin ==
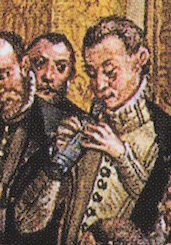
Depiction of the raggett being played in a consort of the Munich court musicians in the 1560s, detail (click through for context image). This may be the oldest depiction of a raggett.

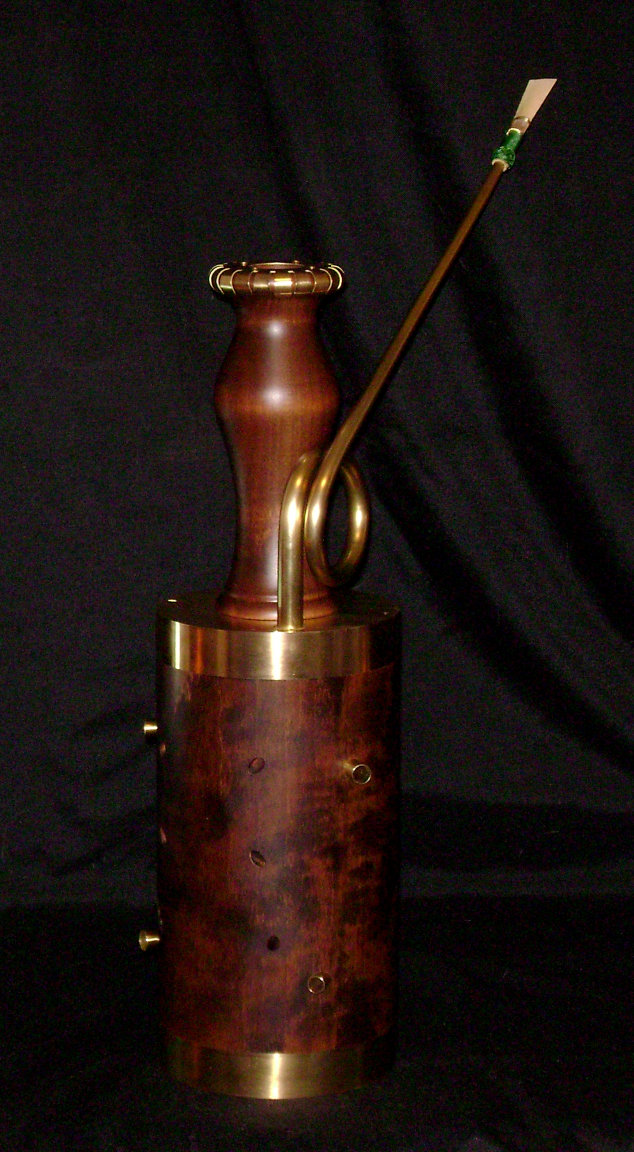
Reproduction of a Baroque rackett, manufactured by Moeck Musikinstrumente + Verlag

The inventor of the rackett is unknown. The first historical mention can be found in German sources Wurttemberg inventories of 1576 (listed as a Raggett) and the Graz inventory of 1590 (listed as Rogetten). Early paintings of the Munich Court band and a carved cabinet by Christof Angermair depict a single rackett being played in a mixed consort of other instruments. Prior to the late seventeenth century, the rackett had a cylindrical bore and the reed was surrounded by a pirouette. The later baroque rackett had an expanding pseudo-conical bore and was blown through a coiled crook inserted into the top of the instrument. A separate bell joint is added to extend the sounding length.

== Sound ==
Will Peebles plays a baroque rackett in concert at the John C. Campbell Folk School

Praetorius noted: "In sound [Renaissance] racketts are quite soft, almost as if one were blowing through a comb. They have no particular distinction when a whole set of them is used together, but when violas da gamba are used with them, or when a single rackett is used together with other wind or stringed instruments and a harpsichord or the like, and is played by a good musician, it is indeed a lovely instrument. It is particularly pleasing and fine to hear on bass parts."

The tone is versatile, with good dynamic and tonal range, and has a warm, rich, vibrating sound. The timbre has been described as "combination of a bassoon and a kazoo".

The baroque rackett, sometimes called a "pocket bassoon" or "sausage bassoon", conversely, sounds much like a dulcian or baroque bassoon, and can easily blend with the same kind of ensemble instruments—violas da gamba, cornetti, historical keyboards, baroque recorders, and small baroque orchestras.
