= Tangmuri =

Double-reed wind instrument

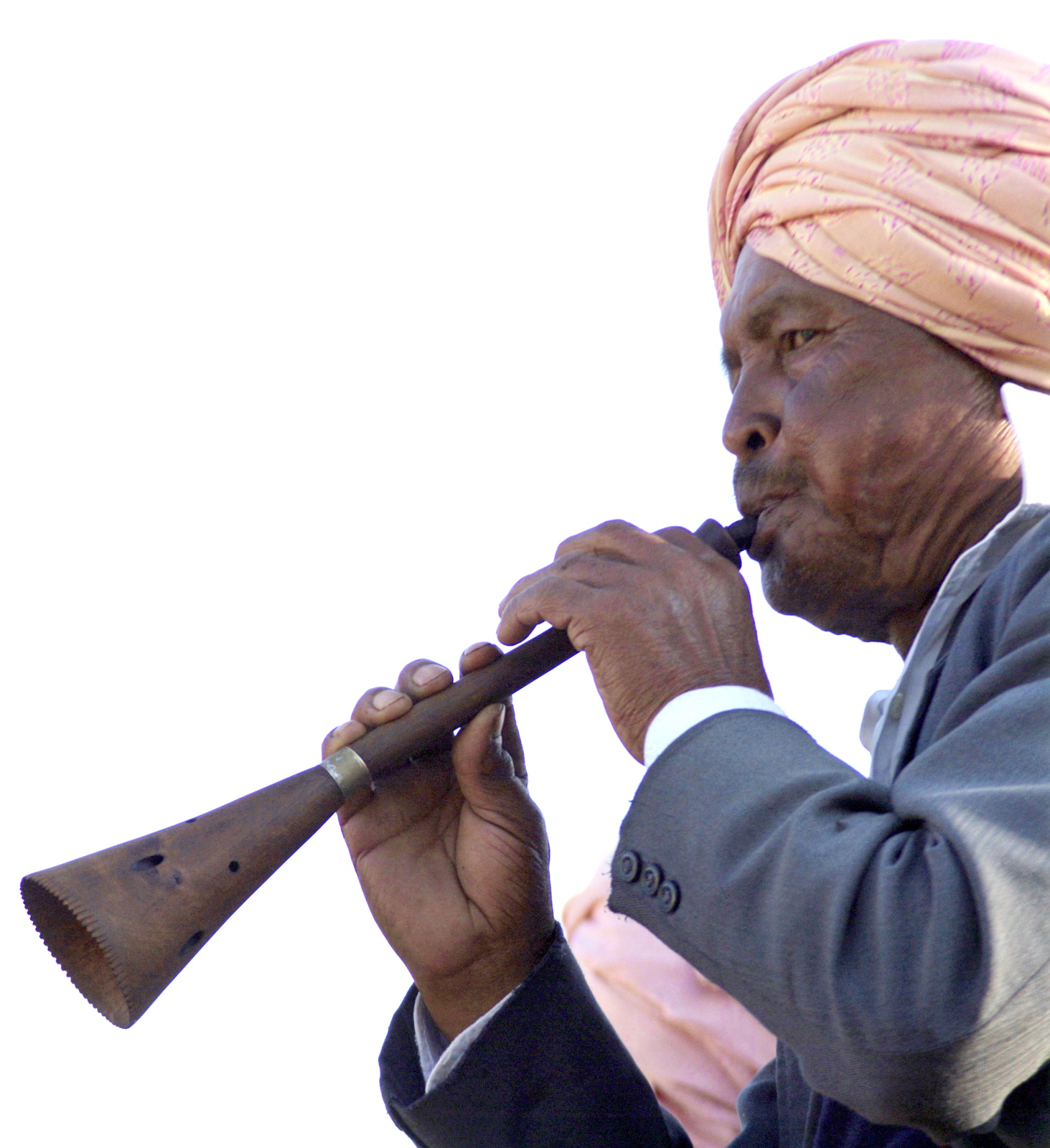
- A Tangmuri player in Shillong, Meghalaya 2010

Wind Instrument
- Inventor(s): Hynniew Trep People

The tangmuri, ka tangmuri in the Khasi language, is a double-reed conical-bore wind-instrument used by the Hynniew Trep people of Meghalaya State in North-East India.

The tangmuri is used by musicians playing for traditional dances, and for other traditional rituals, such as cremations performed according to the indigenous religion, Niam Khasi. The tangmuri delivers a very high pitched sound when played by the musician.

== Description ==
The instrument consists of a turned conical-bore wooden chanter, about 20 cm long, with seven finger-holes on the front, and a separate flared turned 15 cm long wooden bell which is attached to the chanter by a push-fit.
The double-reed is tied onto a thin conical-bore metal tube around 3 cm long, which is wound with thread to hold it in place in the chanter.

== Gallery ==
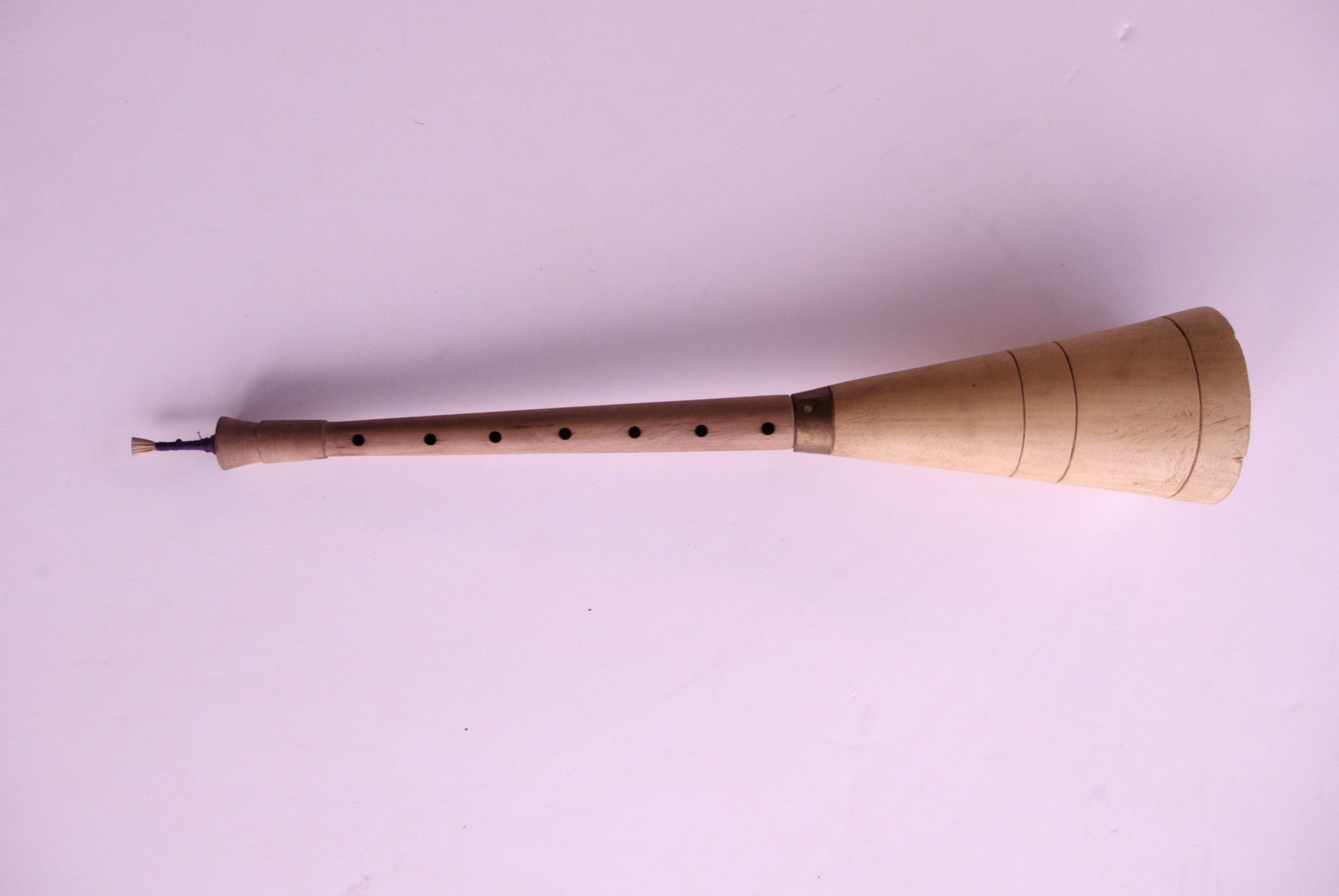
Tangmuri

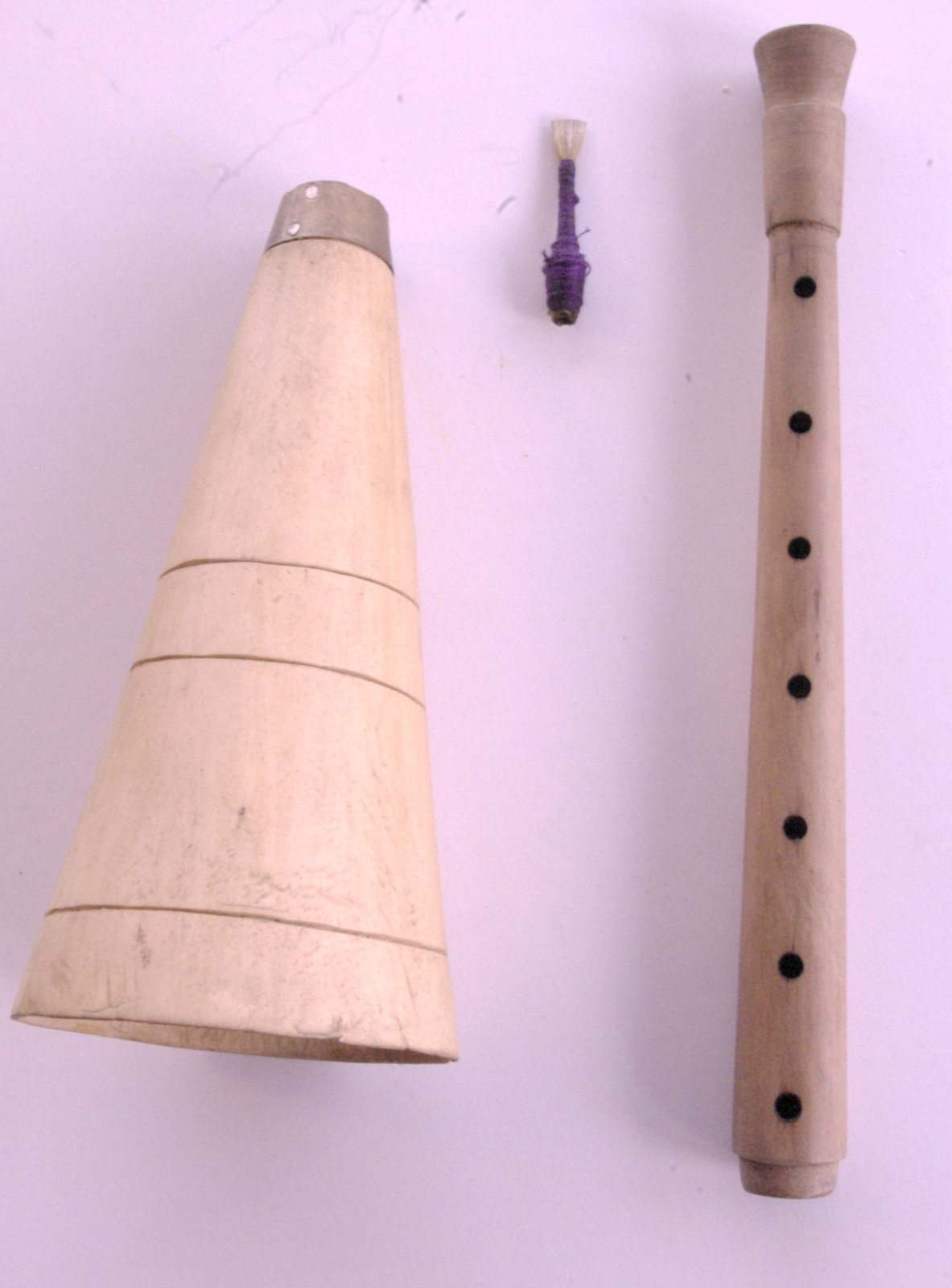
Tangmuri showing its component parts
