= Gralla (instrument) =

Instrument

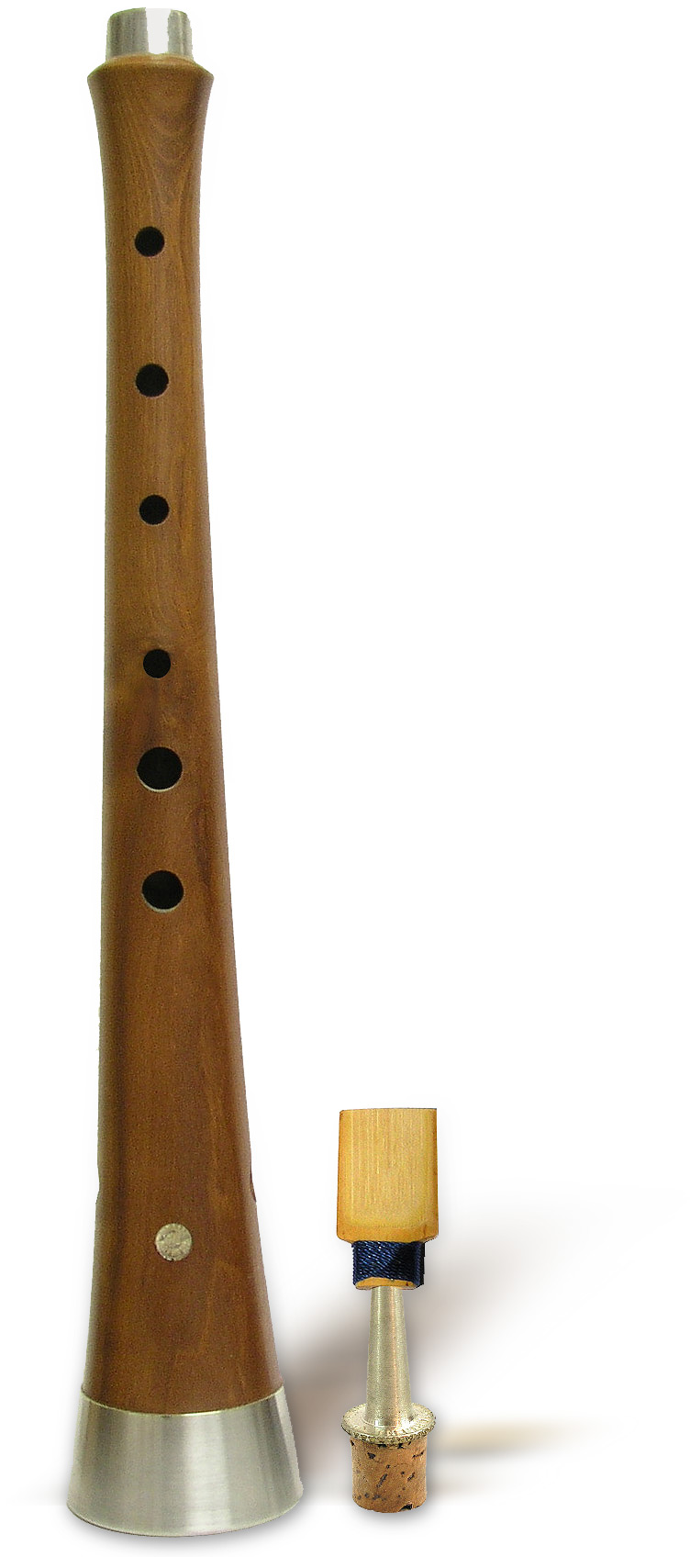
- A gralla with a detached reed

Woodwind instrument
- Other names: Grall de pastor, xaramita, xirimita
- Classification: Wind; Woodwind; Double reed
- Hornbostel–Sachs classification: 422.12 (Double-reeded aerophone with conical tube.)

Related instruments
- Dolçaina; Xeremia

The gralla (Catalan pronunciation: [ˈɡɾaʎə]), also known as grall de pastor, xaramita, dulzaina catalana or xirimita, is a traditional Catalan double reed instrument in the shawm family classified in the group 422.112 in the Hornbostel-Sachs system. The gralla comes from the ancient xeremia a medieval instrument largely used until the Baroque. Probably, the name of the instrument comes from its strident sound similar to the sound of a Jackdaw native to Catalonia and northern Spain and also called 'Gralla' in Catalan.

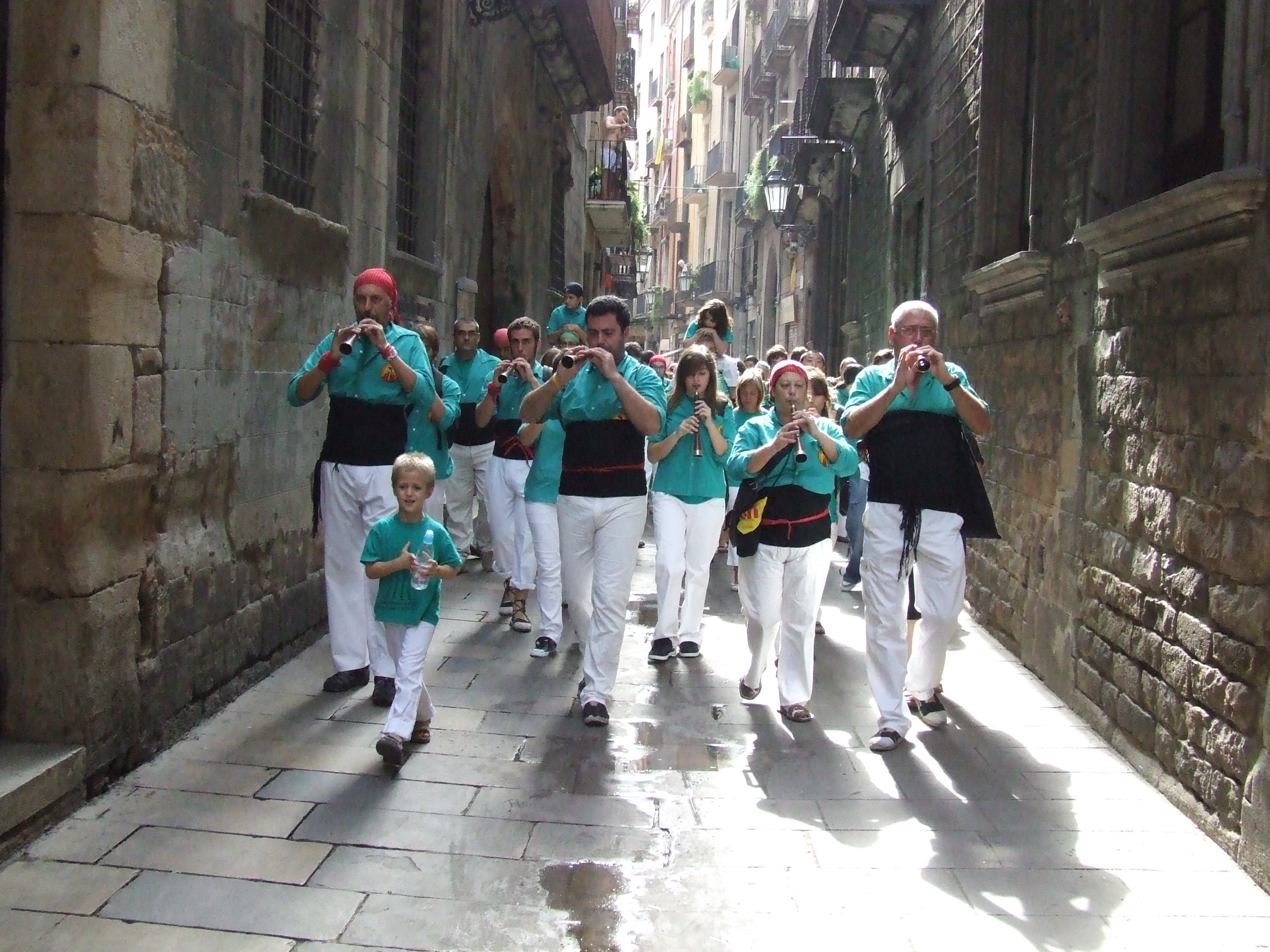
The grallers of a castells team (colla castellera)

This traditional instrument is used during the construction and dismantling of human towers or castells and other traditional festivities. It is usually played with the timbal, a percussion instrument similar to a drum. The traditional gralla melody used in castells, called the toc de castells, serves to advise the castellers within the tower what stage of the construction their colleagues have reached, as they are unable to see this.

The gralla regained popularity in the late 1970s.

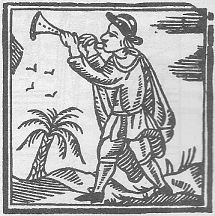
A gralla player or graller.

== Types ==
There are two types of gralla, the seca(dry) and the dolça, (sweet). Both can be characterised by their sound: the gralla seca has a harsher or strident sound while the gralla dolça has metal keys that increase its register.

== Components ==
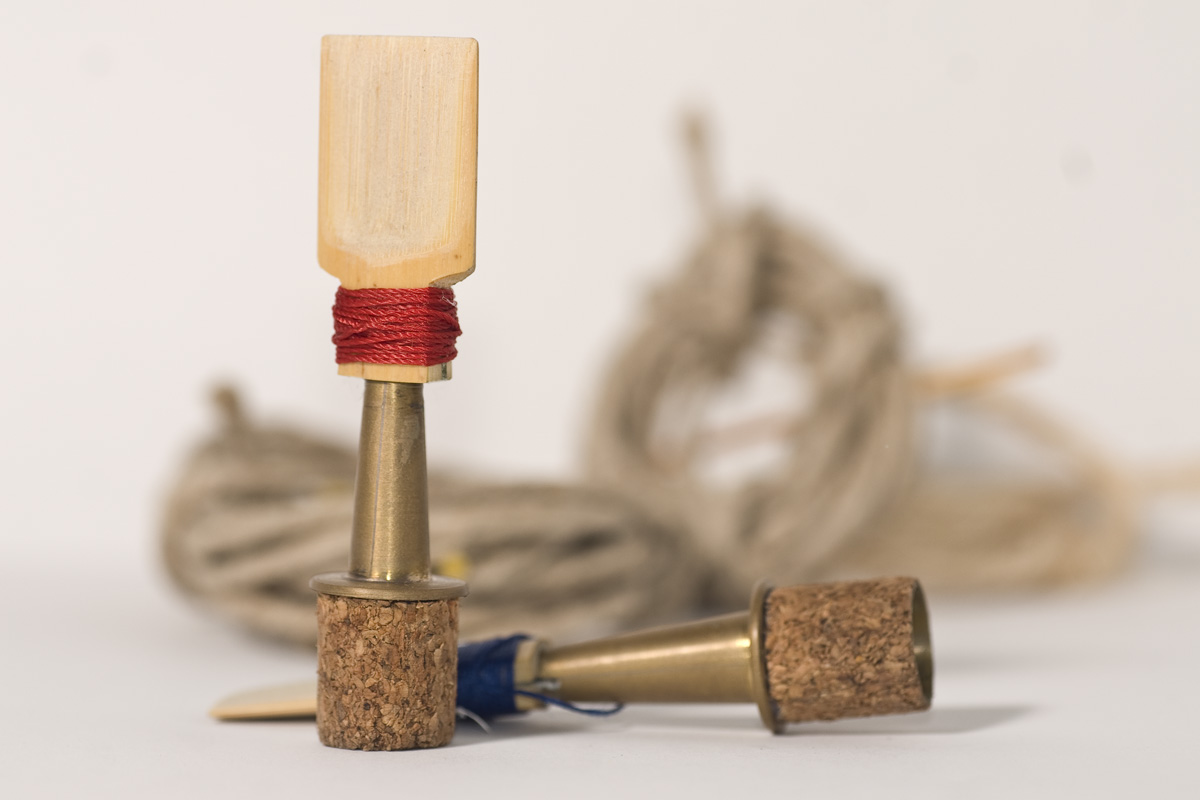
Closeup of the reeds used in gralles

- Cap: in the top of the instrument is where the tudell is inserted with the canya.
- Tub: the part between the tudell and the canya or inxa.
- Tudell: a conic tube made of metal where the canya is inserted.
- Canya or inxa: the double reed.
- Cos: the central part of the instrument. A conical wood tube with six gaps in the front side and one in the back.
- Campana: the final part that act like an amplifier of the sound and has two gaps in the sides. It is usually covered with metal.
