= Kortholt =

Woodwind musical instrument

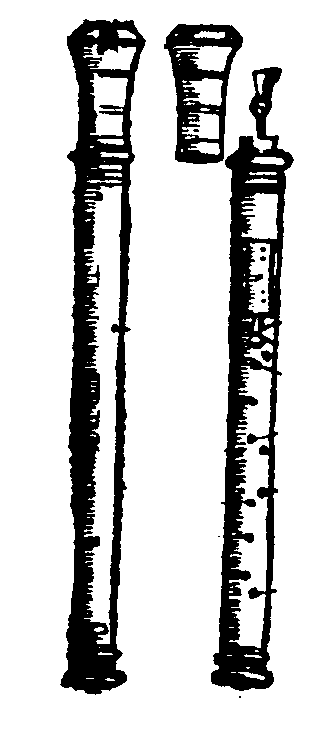
Kortholt from Praetorius, Syntagma musicum, Wolfenbüttel 1619

The kortholt is a musical instrument of the woodwind family, used in the Renaissance period.

The name comes from Low Saxon and means short (kort) piece of wood (holt). This name is mentioned in the work Syntagma musicum by Michael Praetorius, who is the main source for information about this instrument. The name refers to the characteristic low pitch that belies the short length of the instrument, and could be applied more generically to any wind instrument which was deeper in pitch than expected from its length.

The kortholt is a capped reed instrument. Its construction is similar to that of the chanter of a bagpipe. A double reed is mounted inside a chamber. Blowing through a slot in the chamber causes the reed to vibrate; because the reed is not touched by the lips, the performer has little control over the sound. The pitch of the note can be varied by opening or closing finger and side holes along the length of the instrument.

The kortholt is actually double bored, similar to the modern bassoon. The combination of cylindrical bore, which sounds roughly an octave lower than a conical bore, and a bore which is almost twice as long as the outside of the instrument, results in a sound much lower than normally would be possible from an instrument of that length.

The sound is a similar to the crumhorn, but is softer. Although Praetorius only mentions one size (a bass), modern makers provide the standard soprano, alto, tenor and bass. They can be played together in a consort.
