= Sordun =

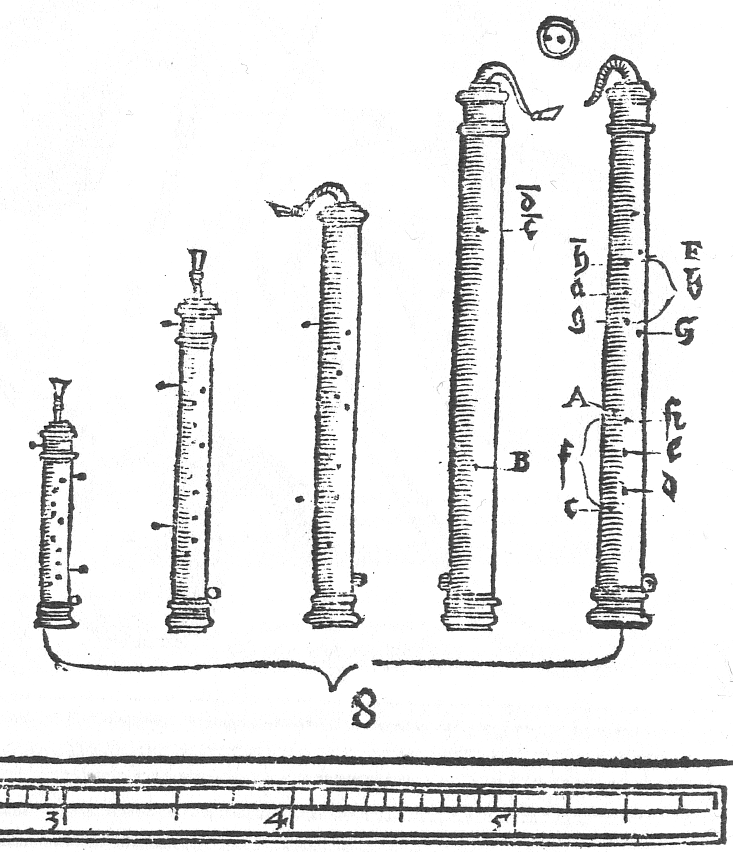
"A consort of sordun," Praetorius, Syntagma Musicum, vol. 2, table XII. Over the bass sordun appears a cross-section of the double bore.

Sordun is a family of archaic wind instruments blown by means of a double reed (sordone or sordun, etc.)

== Etymology ==
Sordun originates from the Italian word Sordino. The primary Italian word in use in these specialised terms is a feminine noun: sordina, with plural sordine; but in international musical terminology a masculine form is much more common: sordino, with plural sordini. The Italian word is derived as a feminine diminutive of the adjective sordo ("deaf", "dull in sound"), from Latin surdus. The alternative forms given above would have as plurals sordini, sordoni, sorduni. The French version of the word is feminine, and is sometimes used in music notation also: sourdine, plural sourdines. Other languages' versions are also feminine: Spanish has sordina, plural sordinas; Portuguese has surdina, plural surdinas.

== Ancient instruments ==
The sordun or sordoni family are often confused with the dolcians (Fr. courtaud, Eng. single curtail or single curtal, Ger. Kort or Kortholt), from which, however, they differed radically. This difference was not understood by Praetorius, who acknowledges his mystification. The contra-bass sordun, he says, hardly half the length of the contra-fagotto, is yet practically of the same pitch, which is astonishing since the bore is only double once upon itself as in the fagotto. The kort likewise is of the same size as the bass sordun, and yet in pitch it is but a tenor.

The following description of the construction and acoustic properties of the sordoni will clear up the mystery. The body consisted of a cylinder of wood in which were cut two parallel channels of narrow cylindrical bore, communicating with each other at the bottom through a bend, but not with ambient air. At the top of the cylinder was fitted a double-reed mouthpiece giving access to the column of air at one end of the bore, while the other was vented through a small hole in the side, similar to the finger-holes; in the tenor, bass and contra members of the family, the reed was attached to a curved brass crook similar to that of the fagotto. So far the description would almost apply to the dolcian also, but in the latter there is the radical difference that the bore of the channels is conical, so that it has the acoustic properties of the open pipe. The sordun, however, having a cylindrical bore, has the acoustic properties of the stopped pipe, i.e. the sound waves are twice the length of the pipe, so that to produce a sound of any given pitch, for instance for C, the bore need only be half the length, i.e. 4 ft. long. Overblowing, on the sordoni, moreover, produced as first harmonic (the only one required for reed-blown instruments in order to produce the diatonic scale for the second octave) not the octave, but the twelfth, or number 3 of the series. This accounts for the fact that instruments of the fagotto and dolcian type require but six or seven holes to give the diatonic scale throughout the compass, whereas the sordoni require 11 or 12 holes. Praetorius states that those figured by him have 12 open holes, and that some specimens have in addition two keys; a hole is also bored through the bottom of the instrument to allow the moisture condensed from the breath to be shaken out. The 12 holes are stopped by means of fingers and thumbs and by the ball of the hand or the fleshy underpart of the joints of the fingers.

Two sourdines belonging to the Museum of the Brussels Conservatoire, said to be facsimiles of some instruments belonging to the emperor Maximilian I's band, are reproduced in Captain U. R. Day's Descriptive Catalogue of Musical Instruments (London, 1891). They differ slightly in construction from the Italian instruments described by Praetorius. The straight crook is set in the side of the instrument, almost at right angles, the top of the cylinder is surmounted by a cap, and there are but 6 open holes, the rest being covered by brass keys in wooden boxes. The pitch of these instruments lies within a semi-tone of that of the contra-bass and bass of Praetorius.

== See also ==
- List of musical terminology
