= Flow resistance =

== Medicine ==
- Vascular resistance

== Physics ==
- Electrical resistance, the measure of the degree to which a conductor opposes the flow of an electric current through that conductor
- Friction
  - Drag (physics) ("air resistance"), fluid or gas forces opposing motion and flow
- The inverse of Hydraulic conductivity, the ease with which water can flow through pore spaces or fractures in soil or rock
- Thermal resistance, a measure of difficulty of heat flow through a substance
  - Thermal conductivity, how well heat flows through a substance
  - Thermal resistance in electronics, heat considerations in electronics design

== Music ==
- Resistance to airflow through a wind instrument due to air friction (for instance, a tightly-coiled French horn has higher resistance than a straight unvalved slide trumpet)
