= Cromorne =

Musical instrument

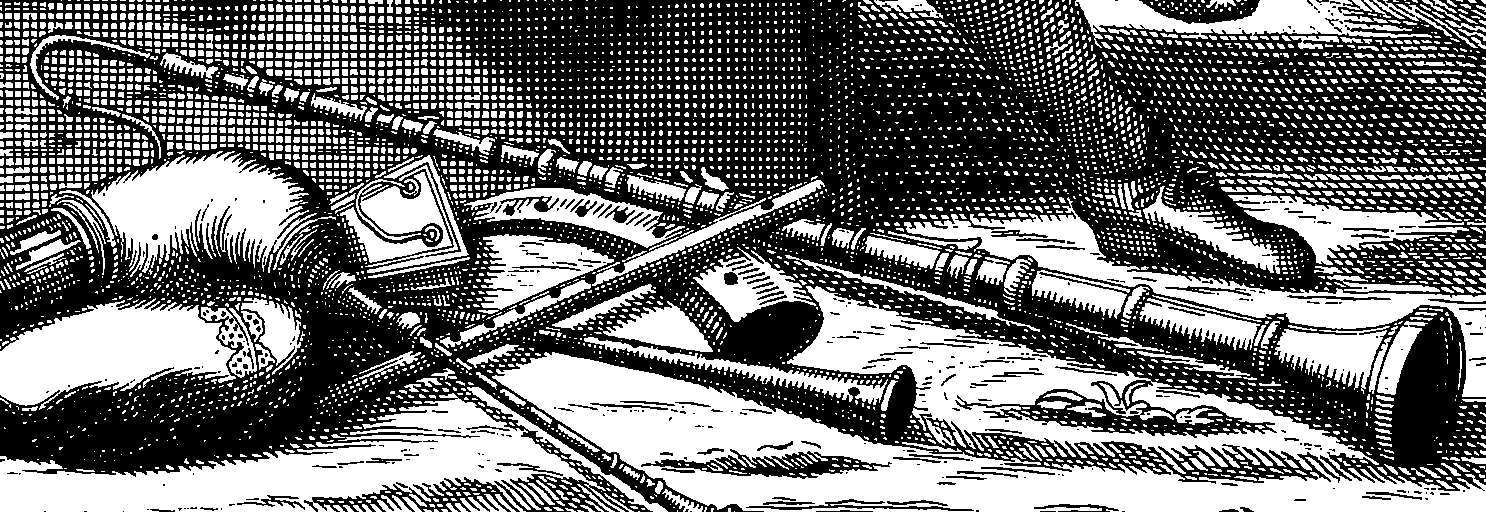
Cromorne (the longest instrument in this illustration)

Cromorne is a French woodwind reed instrument of uncertain identity, used in the early Baroque period in French court music. The name is sometimes confused with the similar-sounding name crumhorn, a musical woodwind instrument probably of different design, called "tournebout" by French theorists in the 17th century.

== Crumhorn ==
Basse de Cromorne from Organ Suite in D major
By Jean-François Dandrieu

By contrast, the crumhorn (also known by names including crum horn, crumm horn, Krummhorn, Krummpfeife, Kumbhorn, cornamuto torto, and piva torto) is a capped double-reed instrument usually shaped like a letter "J" and possessing a rather small melodic range spanning a ninth (i.e. just over an octave) unless extended downward by keys or by the technique of underblowing, which increases the range by a perfect fifth. However, this instrument was apparently little used in England—despite listings in the inventories of Henry VIII and the earls of Arundel at Nonsuch House, and mention in a poem by Sir William Leighton, they are conspicuously absent from inventories and other documents of English town waits—or France and was called a "tournebout" by French theorists including Mersenne (1636), Pierre Trichet (ca 1640), and even as late as Diderot (1767).
