= Dulcian =

Renaissance predecessor of the bassoon

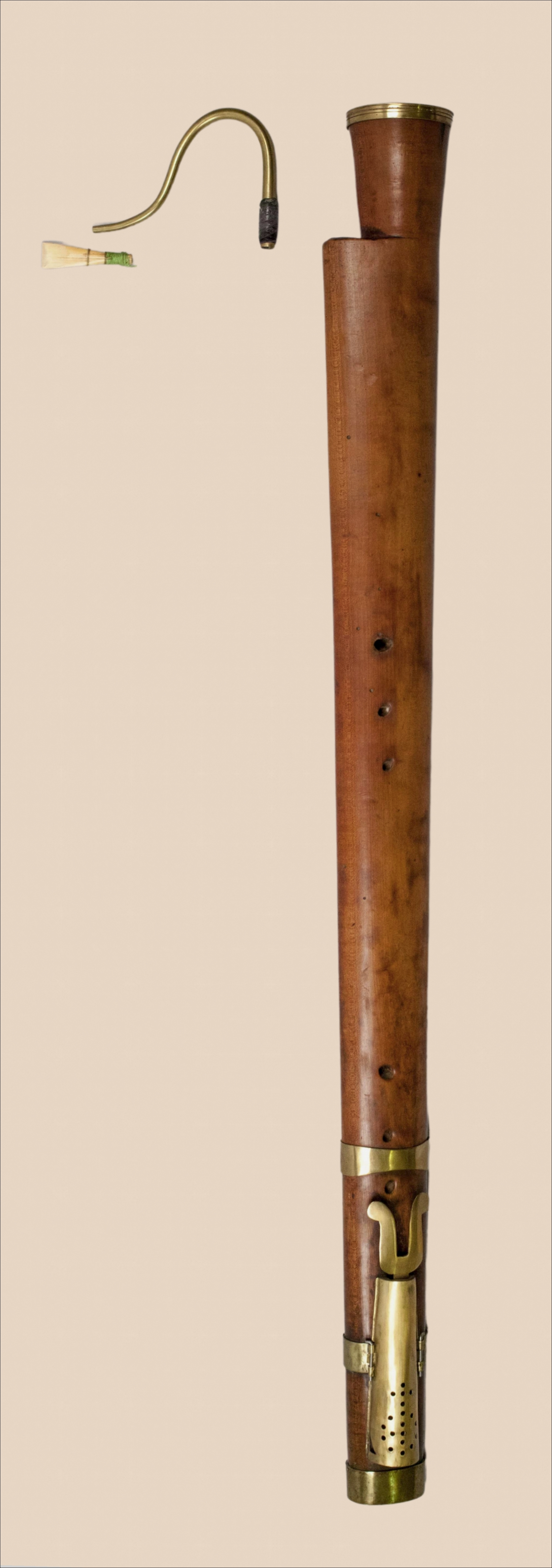
Dulcian, 1700, Museu de la Música de Barcelona

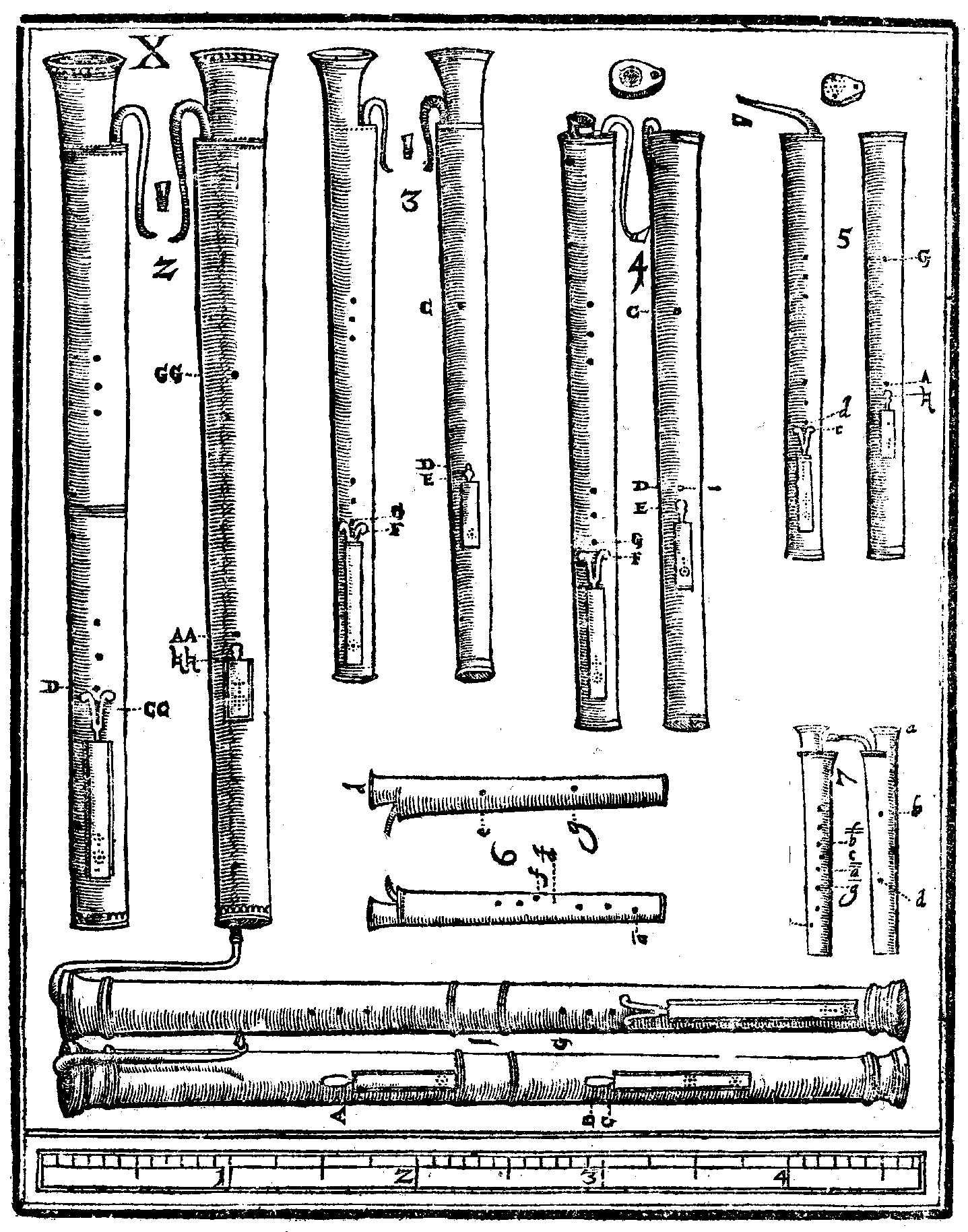
Dulcians in Theatrum Instrumentorum (Michael Praetorius, 1620)

The dulcian is a Renaissance woodwind instrument, with a double reed and a folded conical bore. Equivalent terms include English: curtal, German: Dulzian, French: douçaine, Dutch: dulciaan, Italian: dulciana, Spanish: bajón, and Portuguese: baixão.

The predecessor of the modern bassoon, it flourished between 1550 and 1700, but was probably invented earlier. Towards the end of this period it co-existed with, and was then superseded by, the baroque bassoon. It was played in both secular and sacred contexts, throughout northern and western Europe, as well as in the New World.

== Construction ==
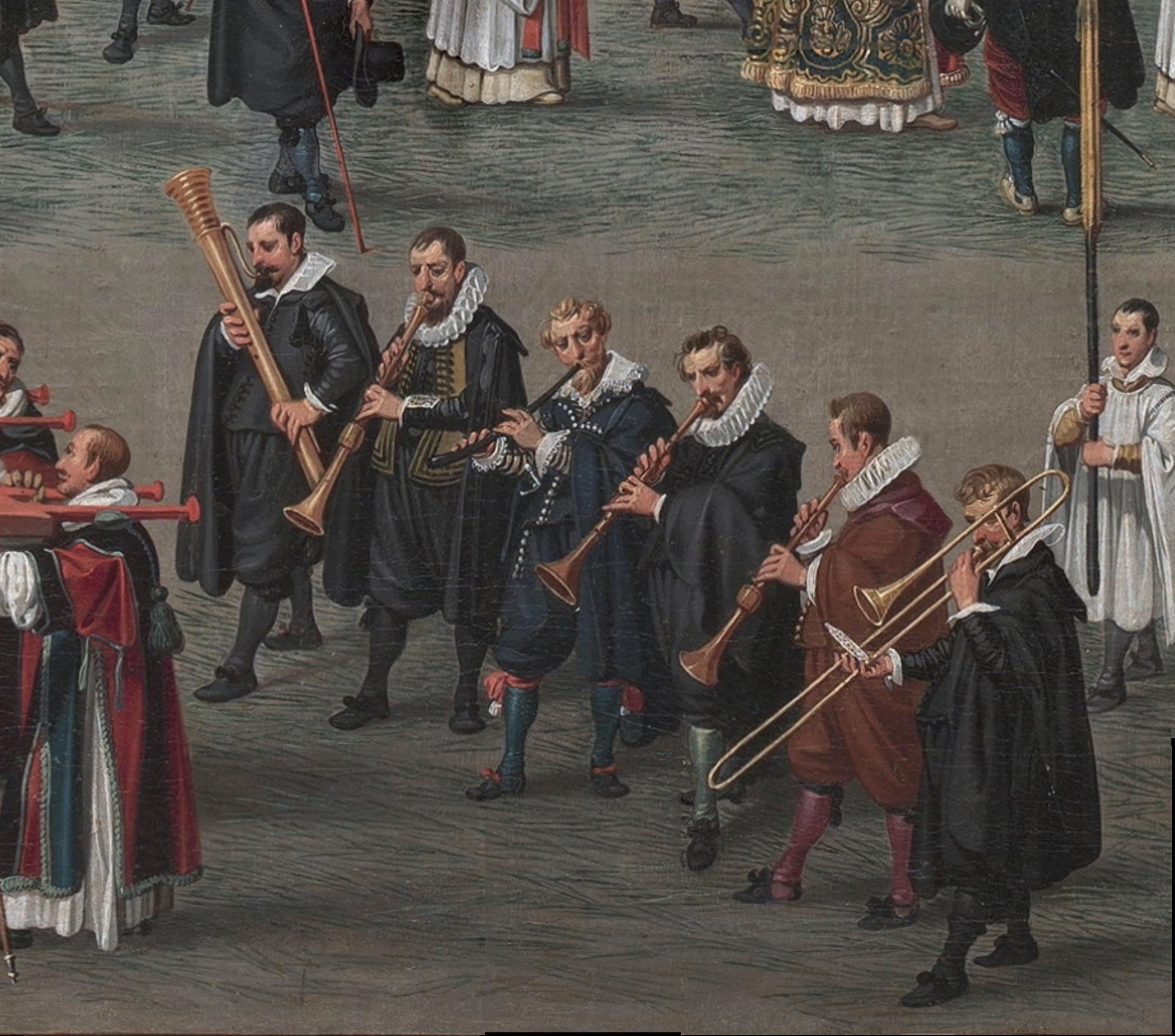
Bass version of dulcian, far left. Other instruments include shawms, a cornett and a sackbutt.

The dulcian is generally made from a single piece of maple, with the bores being drilled and reamed first, and then the outside planed to shape. The reed is attached to the end of a metal bocal, inserted into the top of the small bore. Unlike the bassoon it normally has a flared bell, sometimes made from a separate piece of timber. This bell can sometimes be muted, the mute being either detachable, or built into the instrument. The outside of the instrument can also be covered in leather, like the cornett.

Although the bass in F is the most common size, the dulcian comes in many other sizes: tenor (in C), alto (in F or G) and soprano (in C). There are also examples of a "quart bass" dulcian in C and contrabass in F. The range of each instrument is two and a half octaves, centred on the range of the corresponding singing voice: for example, the bass ranges from C_{2} (two octaves below middle C), to G♯_{4} (the G♯ above middle C).

== Evolution ==
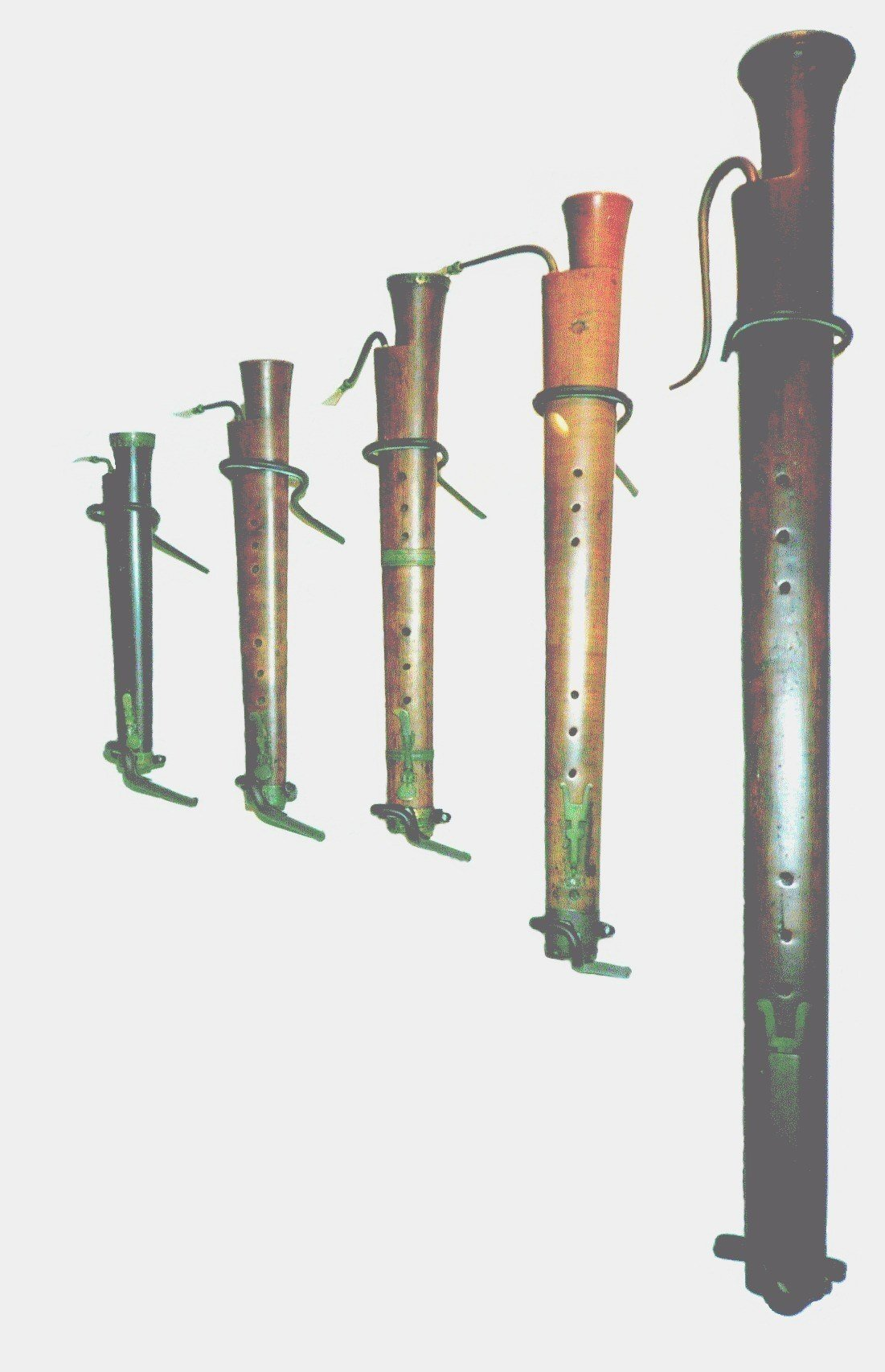
Soprano, G-alto, F-alto, tenor and bass dulcians from the Brussels collection

The reed on the dulcian is fully exposed, allowing the player to control the sound and intonation by embouchure. At the time it first appeared, other double reed instruments either had the reed fully enclosed, like the crumhorn or the bagpipe, or partially enclosed by a pirouette, like the shawm. It has been argued the dulcian displaced the bass shawm, on account of its more convenient size, but it has also been argued that the two co-existed and that the bass shawm appeared at about the same time as the bass dulcian.

The instrument seems to have been in wide use by the middle of the sixteenth century. A set of instruments in various sizes exist in Brussels: these have a maker's mark of "Melchor" and are thought to be Spanish. Another well known example is a slightly later instrument in Linz, leather covered and with a built-in mute. The latest commonly copied example is by Denner, c. 1700, which also has a built in mute. Modern copies of the Linz instrument have a smoother sound and reach the high notes more easily, this is even more the case for modern copies of the Denner instrument.

== Function and repertoire ==
Will Peebles plays a dulcian in concert at the John C. Campbell Folk School

The dulcian is a flexible instrument, capable of being loud enough to play in outdoor bands, quiet enough for chamber music, and expressive enough to join in with the choir. Its uses would have included playing dance music with the shawms and sackbuts of the city watch, chamber music, and the grand polychoral repertoire from Venice and Germany, such as Giovanni Gabrieli and Heinrich Schütz. There are explicit dulcian parts in the sonatas by Dario Castello.
