= Crumhorn =

Double reed musical instrument of the woodwind family

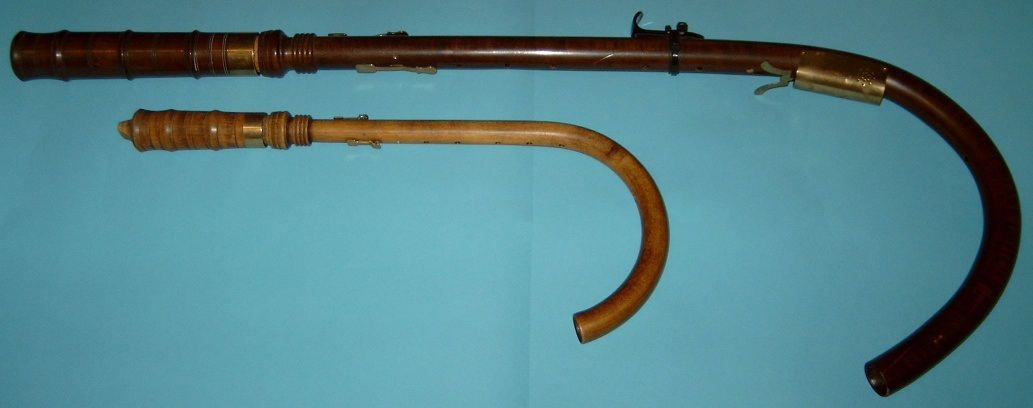
Modern crumhorns with keys, alto crumhorn in F, bass crumhorn in F

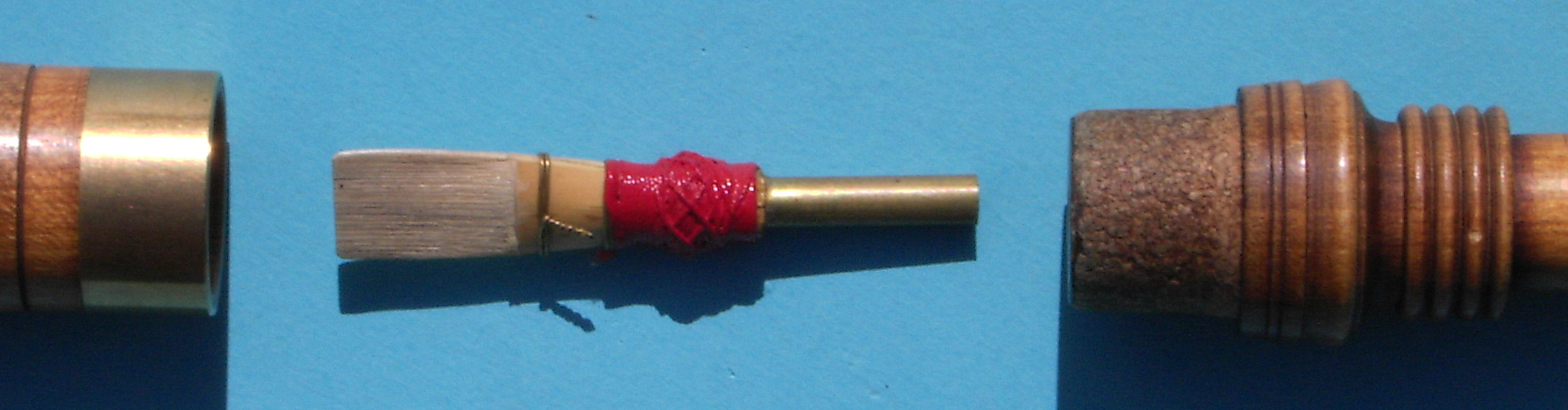
Double-reed of an alto crumhorn in F

The crumhorn is a double reed instrument of the woodwind family, most commonly used during the Renaissance period. In modern times, particularly since the 1960s, there has been a revival of interest in early music, and crumhorns are being played again. It was also spelled krummhorn, krumhorn, krum horn, and cremorne.

== Terminology ==
The name derives from the German Krumhorn (or Krummhorn or Krumporn) meaning 'bent horn'. The first part is cognate with the Middle English crumpen meaning 'to bend, fold, wrinkle', surviving in modern English in crumpled and crumpet 'a wrinkled cake'. The similar-sounding French term cromorne, when used correctly, refers to a woodwind instrument of different design, though the term cromorne is often used in error synonymously with that of crumhorn.

It is uncertain if the Spanish wind instrument orlo (attested in an inventory of 1559) designates the crumhorn, but it is known that crumhorns were used in Spain in the 16th century, and the identification seems likely.

Three Italian terms for the instrument, apart from the equivalent cromorno, are storto, cornamuto torto, and piva torta.

== Description ==
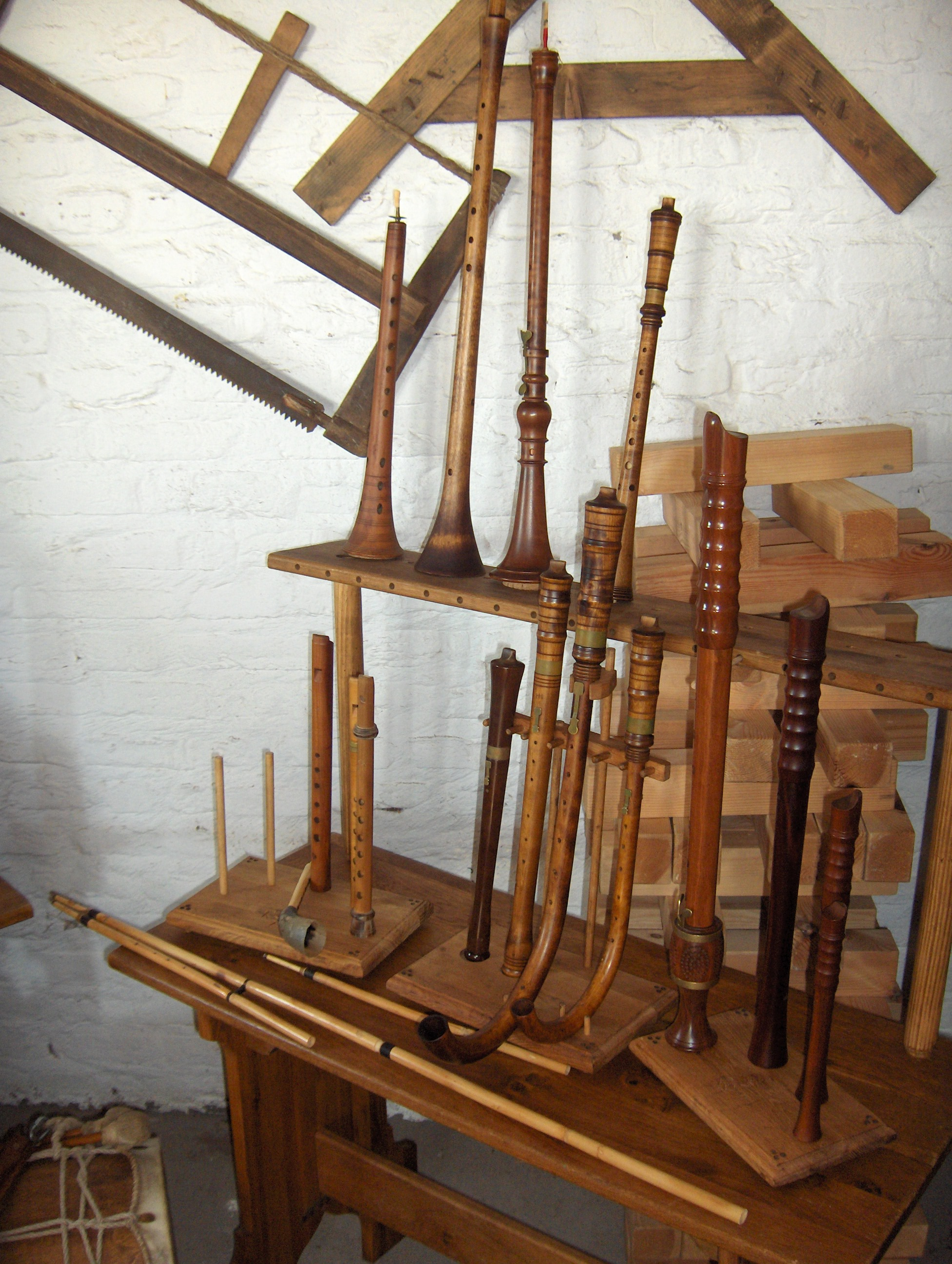
Two crumhorns, 5 & 6 from left.

The crumhorn is a capped reed instrument. Its construction is similar to that of the chanter of a bagpipe. A double reed is mounted inside a long windcap. Blowing through a slot in the windcap produces a musical note. The pitch of the note can be varied by opening or closing finger holes along the length of the pipe. One unusual feature of the crumhorn is its shape; the end is bent upwards in a curve resembling the letter 'J'. The curve is decorative only and does not influence the sound.

Crumhorns make a strong buzzing sound, but quieter than their conical-bore relatives the rauschpfeife and shawm. They have a limited range, usually a ninth. While it is theoretically possible to get the reed to overblow a twelfth above the fundamental note, this is extremely difficult because the reed is not held in the mouth (and even if done would result in a gap of two notes in the scale on historical instruments), and in practice all playing is confined to the fundamental series. Some larger instruments have their range extended downwards by means of additional holes, keys and sliders, and the pitch of the instrument can be lowered a perfect fourth by dropping the breath pressure (called "underblowing"). Some modern instruments have their range extended upwards to an eleventh by two keys. Crumhorns can be chromatically played by using cross-fingerings, except for the minor second above the lowest note.

== Different sizes ==
Because of the limited range, music for crumhorns is usually played by a group of instruments of different sizes and hence at different pitches. Such a group is known as a consort of crumhorns. Crumhorns are built in imitation of the vocal quartet with soprano, alto, tenor and bass as a family, as was true of most instruments of the Renaissance. There are examples of higher- and lower-sounding instruments, of which the great bass is the only commonly used one. Modern instruments are pitched in C and F (Renaissance altos were usually pitched in g, continuing the distance of a fifth between sizes):

Size	Scale range in Helmholtz pitch notation (modern crumhorn in parentheses)	Scale range in scientific pitch notation (modern crumhorn in parentheses)
Soprano	(c^{1}) d^{1}–e^{2} (f^{2})	(C_{4}) D_{4}–E_{5} (F_{5})
Alto	(f^{0}) g^{0}–a^{1} (b♭^{1})	(F_{3}) G_{3}–A_{4} (B♭_{4})
Tenor	c^{0}–d^{1} (f^{1}) or B♭-c^{1} (e♭^{1})	C_{3}–D_{4} (F_{4}) or B♭_{2}-C_{4} (E♭_{4})
Extended tenor	G–f^{1} or F-e♭^{1}	G_{2}–F_{4} or F_{2}–E♭_{4}
Bass	F–g^{0} (b♭^{0})	F_{2}–G_{3} (B♭_{3})
Extended bass	C–b♭^{0}	C_{2}–B♭_{3}
Great Bass	B♭,–c^{0} (e♭^{0}) or C–d^{0} (f^{0})	B♭_{1}–C_{3} (E♭_{3}) or C_{2}–D_{3} (F_{3})
Extended great bass	G,–f^{0}	G_{1}–F_{3}

== Literature for crumhorn ==
There are some pieces specifying crumhorns in two manuscript sets of partbooks prepared for the Prussian court band, including an anonymous setting of "D’Andernach auff dem Reine". Johann Hermann Schein included a Padouana für 4 Krummhörner for crumhorns in his collection Banchetto Musicale (1617), and Thomas Stoltzer wrote in a letter that he had composed his setting of Psalm 37, "Erzürne dich nicht" (1526), such that the lower six of the seven parts could be played on crumhorns. Michael Praetorius suggested the use of crumhorns in some of his sacred vocal works as a possible alternative to trombones, dulcians and other instruments.

In Ursula Dubosarsky's novel Bruno and the Crumhorn, two children, Bruno and Sybil, find themselves learning to play the crumhorn almost by accident.
