= Bassoon makers =

This article contains a list of notable bassoon makers. The lists are split up according to the two different systems used to construct the bassoon.

== Historic ==
- Rottenburgh family, Brussels 18th century

== German (Heckel system) Bassoons ==
- Wilhelm Heckel
- Yamaha
- Fox Products
- W. Schreiber
- Püchner
- Conn-Selmer
- Linton
- Moosmann
- Kohlert
- Moennig/Adler
- B.H. Bell
- Walter
- Stephan Leitzinger
- Guntram Wolf
- Mollenhauer Bassoons
- Amati
- Thore
- Yinfente

=== Beginning Bassoons ===
Several factories in the People's Republic of China produce inexpensive beginner-level instruments that go by the names of these brands. These are similar in size to a Tenoroon and sometimes colloquially referred to as a "fagottini".

- Laval
- Haydn
- Lark
- Guntram Wolf (located in Germany)

== Buffet (French) Bassoons ==
- Buffet Crampon (French system)
- Yannick Ducasse
- AJ musique

== See also ==
- Bassoon
