= Semi-contrabassoon =

Musical instrument

Semi-Contrabassoon
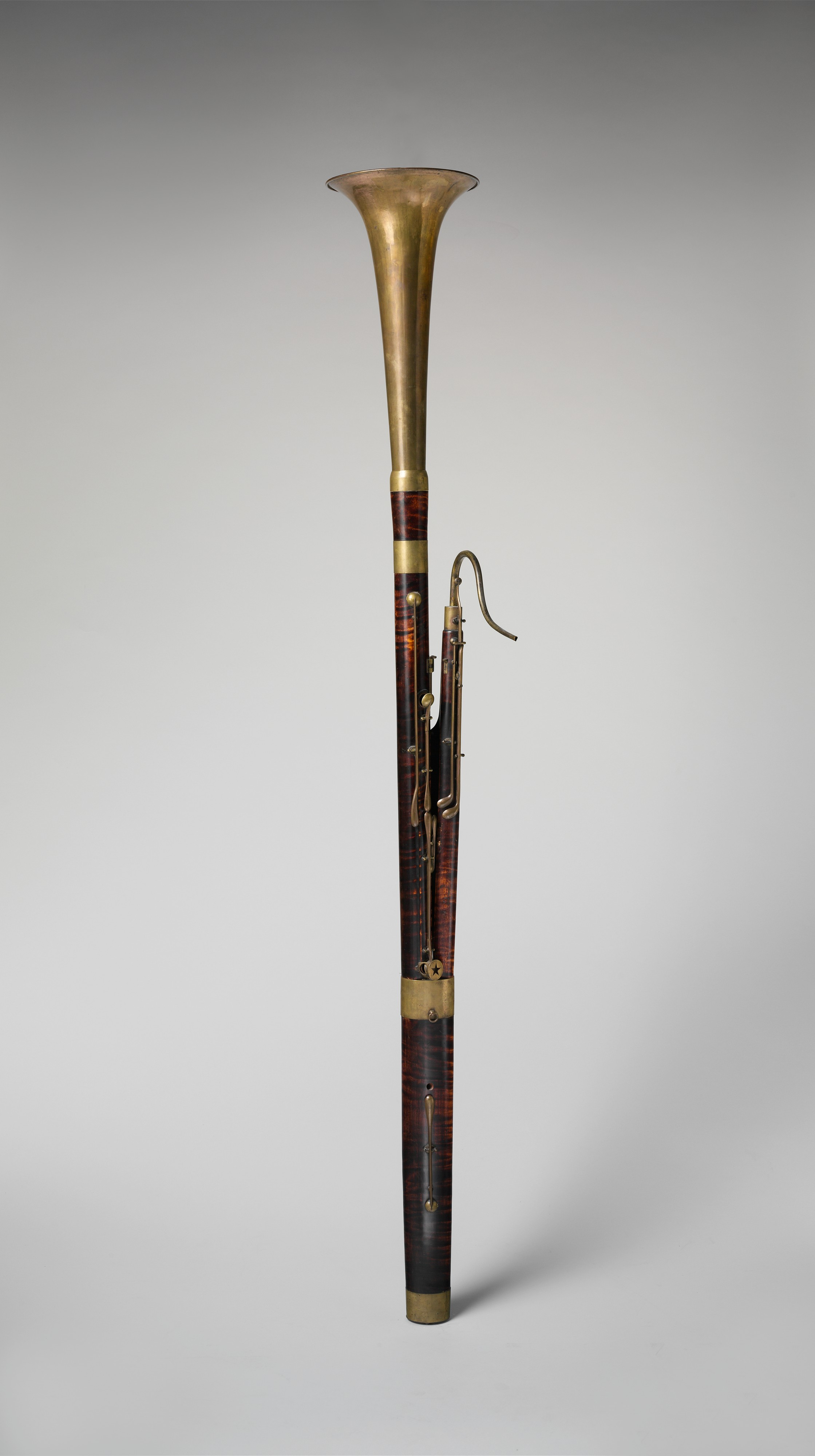

Woodwind instrument
- Hornbostel–Sachs classification: 422.112–71 (Double-reeded aerophone with keys)
- Developed: eighteenth century

Related instruments
- Bassoon; Contraforte; Tenoroon; Dulcian

The semi-contrabassoon (also called quint bassoon, semi-contra or half-contra) is a double reed woodwind instrument pitched between the bassoon and the contrabassoon. It is pitched in either F (quint bass) or G (quart bass) a fifth or fourth, respectively, below the bassoon. The cantata Nach dir, Herr, verlanget mich, BWV 150, by Johann Sebastian Bach requires a bassoon in A, lower by a minor third than the ordinary bassoon.

== History ==
These instruments were used mostly in the eighteenth century and are remnants of the old quart bass dulcians. Among the instruments surviving from this period is a semi-contrabassoon made in Leipzig by Johann Heinrich Eichentopf, who was active there from about 1717 until 1749. The organist Charles Marie Widor in his book on orchestration expected that the semi-contra would be added to the orchestra's roster.

The basson-quinte has not yet been made, but bassoon-players are calling for it. It would form the true bass of the Woodwind group, a fifth below the standard instrument, descending consequently to E♭, a semitone lower than the double bass. The low A, which Wagner wrote below B♭ is admirably rich and full; 'then', say professionals, 'why not descend to E♭, with the same fingering and the same capabilities as the ordinary bassoon?' We have already seen that the low fifth, from double B♭ to double F, is sufficiently robust to bear any weight of sound; the "new" low fifth would be still more robust. The basson-quinte is said to be easy of construction; we look to instrument makers to provide us with it in the near future.

— Charles Marie Widor, C. Pierre, La facture instrumentale à l'exposition de 1889.

No instruments were ever constructed on his instigation. Widor's remarks come in light of the dismal state of the French contrabassoon in the late 19th century, which was generally replaced with a contrabass sarrusophone. Arthur Sullivan is said to have owned a semi-contra in F and included parts for it in some of his operettas. Aside from the Great (quart) bass dulcians, the only modern reproductions of historical semi-contras are being made by Guntram Wolf of Germany.
