= Catherine Young =

Catherine Young (or similar) may refer to:

== Performers ==
- Catherine Young (1918–1967), married name of German-American actress Kaaren Verne
- Kathy Young (born 1945), American pop singer
- Cathy Young (vocalist) (born 1951), Canadian folk singer and songwriter
- Katherine Young (musician), American bassoonist and composer
- Katie Nicole Young, American beauty pageant winner, Miss Texas USA 1992
- Kate Young, Scottish fiddler with 2015 Songs of Separation

== Public officials ==
- Kay Young (Caroline Kate Young, born 1944), Canadian legislator for Newfoundland and Labrador
- Kate Young (politician) (born 1955), Canadian MP for London West in Ontario
- Catharine Young (politician) (born 1960), American state legislator from New York
- Katy Yaroslavsky (born 1980), née Young, American member of Los Angeles City Council

== Sportswomen ==
- Kathy McEdwards (born 1957), or Young, Canadian curler
- Kathryn Young, American rower, see 1990 World Rowing Championships
- Kate Young, Australian breaststroke swimmer, see 2002 Oceania Swimming Championships

== Writers ==
- Catharine Young (journalist), (1826–1908), English pioneering newspaper writer
- Katherine K. Young (born 1944), Canadian historian of religions
- Cathy Young (born 1963), Russian-born American libertarian author

== Others ==
- Katherine Young (centenarian) (1901–2005), Chinese-American centenarian

== See also ==
- Kathleen Baxter (1901–1988), née Young, English women's rights activist
- Kathleen Tankersley Young (1902–1933), American writer, poet, and editor
- Young Catherine, 1991 American TV miniseries about early life of Catherine the Great
- Young (surname)
