= Leitzinger =

Leitzinger is a surname. Notable people with the surname include:

- Antero Leitzinger (born 1962), Finnish historian
- Butch Leitzinger (born 1969), American racing driver
- Stephan Leitzinger, maker of bassoons
