= Galandronome =

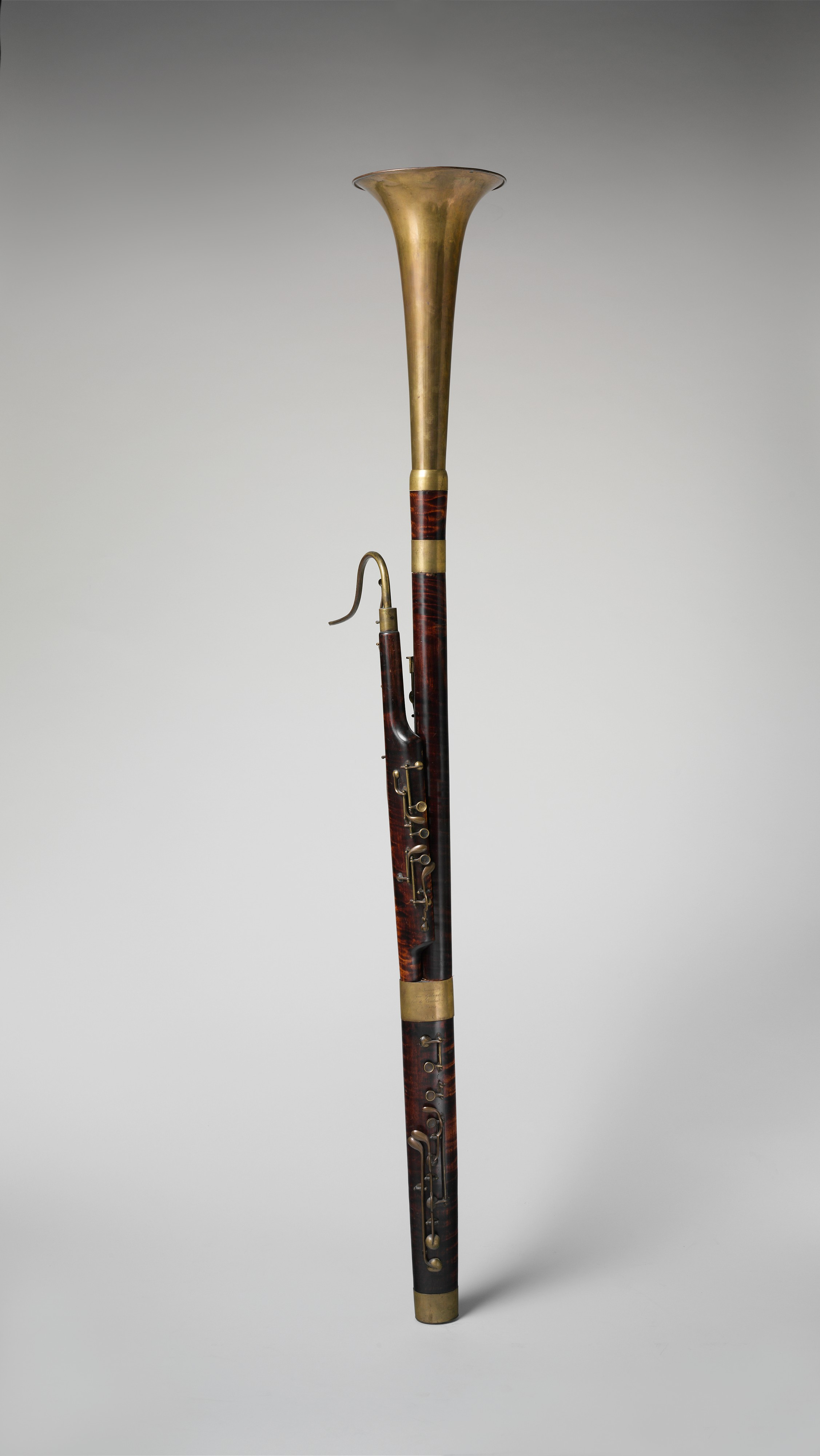
The galandronome, a half-contra bassoon. The Metropolitan Museum of Art, New York.

The galandronome is an obscure military bassoon tuned in B♭. It was invented or improved by a Parisian instrument maker named Galander around 1853.

== History ==
Very little is known about the galandronome and its inventor Galander, whose first name has been lost. Galander seems to have taken over the Paris workshop from instrument maker Jean Nicolas Savary (1786–c.1850) around 1840 and kept it until 1854 when he sold it to Georges Schubert. Although the galandronome is unanimously called a military bassoon, Will Jansen believes that it was never suitable as a military instrument due to its big flared bell that would catch rain.

== Description ==
The galandronome is made of maple and brass with a body slightly larger than the usual bassoons. It has a large flare bell, possibly the largest ever made for a bassoon. Its dimensions are: length (end to end) 1545 mm; length of tube ca. 2888 mm; diameter of bell 212 mm; crook ca. 370 mm; length of wing section 553 mm; length of butt section 464 mm; length of short wooden section between long section and bell 140 mm; length of long section 639 mm; length of bell 443 mm.

Like all bassoons, it is a double-reed instrument. It has 19 keys and two open holes. The galandronome is tuned in B♭, below the normal bassoon in C and above the semi-contrabassoon in F or G. The only known surviving instrument is found at the Metropolitan Museum of Art in New York City. It carries the engraving “Innové / par Galander / Rue de Constantine 27, / à Paris. / I. C.” It is therefore possible that Galander did not actually invent the galandronome but improved – or innovated – it, possibly based on an instrument of Savary's whose bassoons were widely copied at the time.

Images of the galandronome, licensed for non-commercial educational purposes, are available in the collection of the Metropolitan Museum of Art.

== In literature ==
In Against the Day, Thomas Pynchon mentions the galandronome, although the description appears to be that of a valved ophicleide:

[Gastón brings] out a towering contraption of tarnished and beat-up brass covered with valves and keys, whose upper end flared open like something in a marching band.
“Sure. Where′s the trigger on it again?”
“It is called the Galandronome—a military bassoon, once standard issue in French army bands—my uncle salvaged this one from the Battle of Puebla, you can see a couple of dents from Mexican bullets here, and here?”
