= Margaret Cookhorn =

English contrabassoonist

Margaret Cookhorn is a British classical contrabassoonist and bassoonist. She is Principal Contrabassoon and Bassoon with the City of Birmingham Symphony Orchestra, bassoonist with the Birmingham Contemporary Music Group and, notably, has pursued a career as a contrabassoon soloist. John Woolrich's contrabassoon concerto Falling Down was written for her, which she most recently performed at the BBC Proms in 2015.

Cookhorn is a tutor at the Royal Birmingham Conservatoire and for the CBSO Youth Orchestra.
