= Contrabassoon =

Lower-pitched instrument of the bassoon family

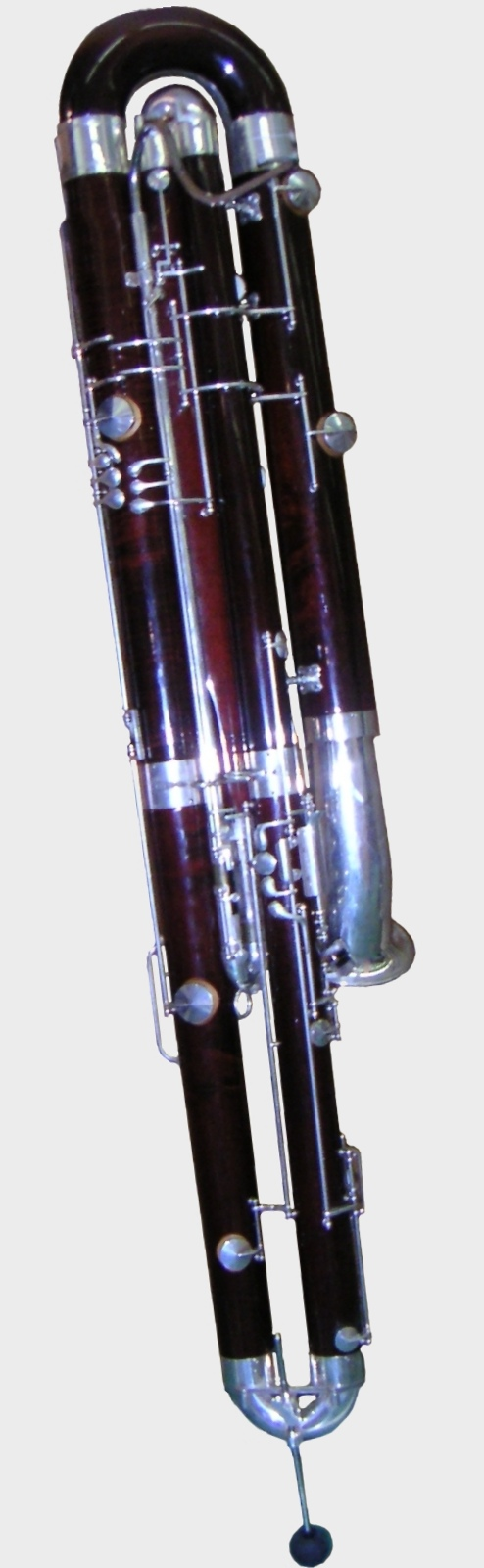

Woodwind instrument
- Other names: double bassoon; Kontrafagott (DE); contrafagot (SP); controfagotto (IT); contrebasson (FR)
- Hornbostel–Sachs classification: 422.112–71 (Double-reeded aerophone with keys)
- Developed: Mid 18th century

Playing range
- Written pitch, sounds one octave lower Sounding pitch

Related instruments
- Bassoon; Contraforte; Tenoroon; Dulcian

The contrabassoon, also known as the double bassoon, is a larger version of the bassoon, sounding an octave lower. Its technique is similar to its smaller cousin, with a few notable differences.

== Differences from the bassoon ==
The reed is considerably larger than the bassoon's, at 65–75 mm (2.6–3.0 in) in total length (and 20 mm (0.8 in) in width) compared with 53–58 mm (2.1–2.3 in) for most bassoon reeds. The large blades allow ample vibration that produces the low register of the instrument. The general structure of the reed is very similar to a bassoon reed, and as with bassoon reeds scraping the reed affects the intonation, tone and response of the instrument.

Contrabassoons possess a simplified version of bassoon keywork, although all open toneholes on bassoon are necessarily replaced with keys and pads due to the physical distances. In the lower register, its fingerings are almost identical to bassoon's. However, differences in fingering begin in the second register, and are totally unrelated in the high register, partly because contrabassoon's harmonic series is different to bassoon's.

The instrument is twice as long as the bassoon, curves around on itself twice and, due to its weight and shape, is supported by an endpin rather than a seat strap. Accounting for length, the bore is narrower than bassoon's, although still wider than that of an oboe or cor anglais. Additional support is sometimes provided by a strap around the player's neck. A wider hand position is also required, as the primary finger keys are widely spaced. The contrabassoon has a water key to expel condensation and a tuning slide for gross pitch adjustments. The instrument comes in a few pieces (plus bocal); some models cannot be disassembled without a screwdriver. Sometimes, the bell can be detached, and instruments with a low A extension often come in two parts.

== Range, notation and tone ==
The contrabassoon is a very deep-sounding woodwind instrument that plays in the same sub-bass register as the tuba, double bass, or contrabass clarinet. It has a sounding range beginning at B♭_{0} (or A_{0}, on some instruments) and extending up over three octaves to D_{4}, though the highest fourth is rarely scored for. Donald Erb and Kalevi Aho write even higher in their concertos for the instrument (to A♭_{4} and C_{5}, respectively), but this is extraordinary and well beyond the expectations of the typical instrument or player. At the lower end, Richard Bobo of the Tulsa Symphony has designed a "subcontrabassoon", a full octave below the contrabassoon, and is intent on manufacturing the first working prototype.

Contrabassoon parts are notated an octave above sounding pitch, and most often use bass clef. Like bassoon, extended high-register passages may use tenor clef, though this is rarely necessary due to the rarity of such passages. The use of treble clef is even less common, and is only necessary for the most ambitious solo repertoire.

Tonally, it sounds similar to the bassoon, but at all parts of its compass are distinctly different in tone from it. There is a "thinning" of the sound in the extreme high register, as in all double reeds, but unlike oboe and bassoon which become more penetrative and "intense" in this register, the contrabassoon's sound becomes substantially less audible and is easily drowned out. Conversely, in its lower register the contrabassoon has a booming quality, similar to organ pedals, which enable it to produce powerful contrabass tones when desired (aided by the flared bell, which the bassoon does not have). The contrabassoon can also produce a "buzz" or "rattle", particularly when loud and in its low register, which gives the sound an edged quality. This effect can be mitigated greatly by changes to the reed design, but it can be a desirable quality for some players, as it adds to the sinister or monstrous quality which some contrabassoon writing seeks to effect, and causes the contrabassoon sound to be more prominent in musical textures.

== History ==
=== Precursors ===
Precursors to the contrabassoon are documented as early as 1590 in Austria and Germany, at a time when the growing popularity of doubling the bass line led to the development of lower-pitched dulcians. Examples of these low-pitched dulcians include the octavebass, the quintfagott, and the quartfagott. There is evidence that a contrafagott was used in Frankfurt in 1626. Baroque precursors to the contrabassoon developed in France in the 1680s, and later in England in the 1690s, independent of the dulcian developments in Austria and Germany during the previous century.

=== Baroque era – present ===
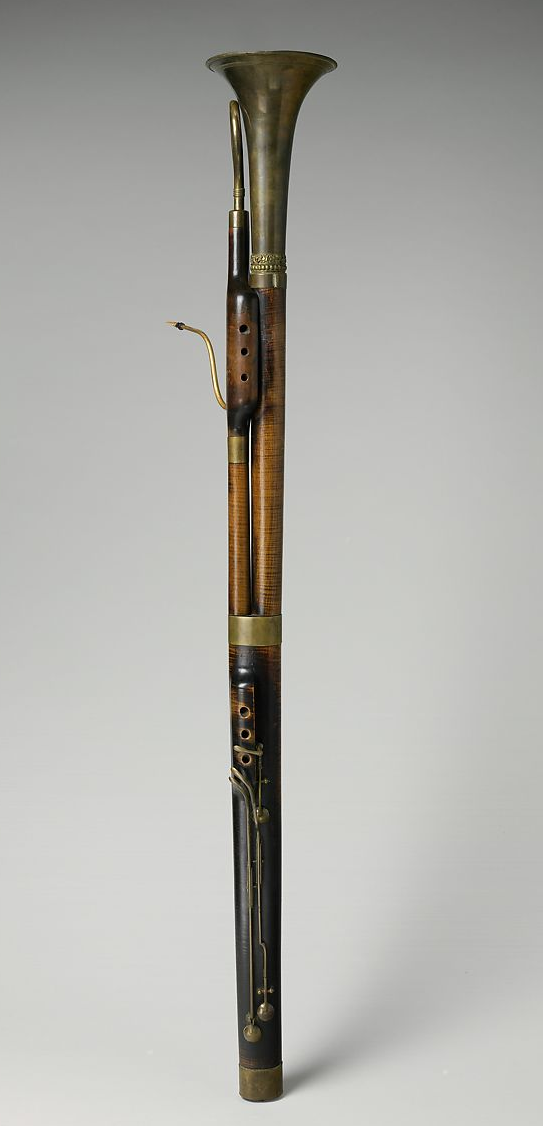
Contrabassoon made in Vienna in the first half of the 19th century

The contrabassoon was developed, especially in England, in the mid-18th century; the oldest surviving instrument, which came in four parts and has only three keys, was built in 1714. It was around that time that the contrabassoon began gaining acceptance in church music. Some notable early uses of the contrabassoon during this period include in J.S. Bach's St. John's Passion (1749 and 1739-1749 versions), and G.F. Handel's L'Allegro (1740) and Music for the Royal Fireworks (1749). Until the late 19th century, the instrument typically had a weak tone and poor intonation. For this reason, the contrabass woodwind parts often were scored for, and contrabassoon parts were often played on a serpent, contrabass sarrusophone or, less frequently, reed contrabass, until improvements by Heckel in the late 19th century secured the contrabassoon's place as the standard double reed contrabass.

For more than a century, between 1880 and 2000, Heckel's design remained relatively unchanged. Chip Owen, at the American company Fox, began manufacturing an instrument in 1971 with some improvements. Generally, during the 20th century changes to the instrument were limited to an upper vent key near the bocal socket, a tuning slide, and a few key linkages to facilitate technical passages. In 2000, Heckel announced a completely new keywork for its instrument and Fox introduced its own new key system based on input from New York Philharmonic contrabassoonist Arlan Fast. Both companies' improvements allow for improved technical facility as well as greater range in the high register. Benedikt Eppelsheim developed the Contraforte, a "redesigned contrabassoon", in collaboration with Guntram Wolf in the early 2000s.

== Current use ==
Cello suites (excerpt)
This segment of J.S. Bach's cello suites, played on a contrabassoon.

Most major orchestras use one contrabassoonist, either as a primary player or a bassoonist who doubles, as do a large number of symphonic bands.

The contrabassoon is a supplementary orchestral instrument and is most frequently found in larger symphonic works, often doubling the bass trombone or tuba at the octave. Frequent exponents of such scoring were Brahms and Mahler, as well as Richard Strauss, and Dmitri Shostakovich. The first composer to write a separate contrabassoon part in a symphony was Beethoven, in his Fifth Symphony (1808) (it can also be heard providing the bass line in the brief "Janissary band" section of the fourth movement of his Symphony No. 9, just prior to the tenor solo), although Bach, Handel (in his Music for the Royal Fireworks), Haydn (e.g., in both of his oratorios The Creation and The Seasons, where the part for the contrabassoon and the bass trombone are mostly, but not always, identical), and Mozart had occasionally used it in other genres (e.g., in the Coronation Mass). Composers have often used the contrabassoon to comical or sinister effect by taking advantage of its seeming "clumsiness" and its sepulchral rattle, respectively. A clear example of this can be heard in Paul Dukas' The Sorcerer's Apprentice (originally scored for contrabass sarrusophone). Igor Stravinsky's The Rite of Spring is one of the few orchestral works that requires two contrabassoons.

As a featured instrument, the contrabassoon can be heard in several works, most notably Maurice Ravel's Mother Goose Suite, and at the opening of Piano Concerto for the Left Hand. Gustav Holst gave the contrabassoon multiple solos in The Planets, primarily in "Mercury, the Winged Messenger" and "Uranus, the Magician".

Solo literature is somewhat lacking, although some modern composers such as Gunther Schuller, Donald Erb, Michael Tilson Thomas, John Woolrich, Kalevi Aho, Ruth Gipps and Daniel Dorff have written concertos for this instrument (see below). Stephen Hough has written a trio for piccolo, contrabassoon and piano Was mit den Tränen geschieht. Contrabassoon may theoretically play music for bassoon, which has much more solo repertoire, but the sonic and mechanical differences from the bassoon (and bassoon's comparative facility in the high register) mean that bassoon repertoire is not always suited to contra.

== Notable solos and soloists ==
Most major symphony orchestras employ a contrabassoon, and many have programmed concerts featuring their contrabassoonist as soloist. For example, Michael Tilson Thomas: Urban Legend for Contrabassoon and Orchestra featuring Steven Braunstein, San Francisco Symphony; Gunther Schuller: Concerto for Contrabassoon featuring Lewis Lipnick, National Symphony Orchestra; John Woolrich: Falling Down featuring Margaret Cookhorn, City of Birmingham Symphony Orchestra; Erb: Concerto for Contrabassoon featuring Gregg Henegar, London Symphony Orchestra; Kalevi Aho: Concerto for Contrabassoon featuring Lewis Lipnick Bergen Symphony Orchestra

One of the few contrabassoon soloists in the world is Susan Nigro, she has released several CDs.

Henry Skolnick commissioned, premiered and recorded Aztec Ceremonies for contrabassoon by Graham Waterhouse.

A rare use of the instrument in jazz was by Garvin Bushell, who sat in as a guest with saxophonist John Coltrane during his 1961 recording sessions at the Village Vanguard.

== Manufacturers ==
=== Current ===
As of 2019, there are nine firms which manufacture modern contrabassoons (in alphabetical order):

- Amati
- Fox
- Heckel
- Kronwalt (a collaboration between Guntram Wolf and Rudolf Walter) and Guntram Wolf (Kontraforte)
- Mönnig-Adler
- Mollenhauer (also manufactures contrabassoons under the Schreiber brand)
- Moosmann
- Püchner
- Takeda

=== Period instruments ===
There are a few makers producing copies of period instruments. Most nobably, Guntram Wolf offers a baroque contrabassoon after Eichentopf and two instruments from the classical era after Uhlmann and an unknown maker.

=== Historic ===
These firms once manufactured contrabassoons, but no longer do so.

- Lignatone (Czechoslovakia)
- Cabart (Paris) stopped after purchase by Lorée in 1974.
- Buffet Crampon (Paris): Keywork differentiated from the German style somewhat.
