= Ulysses Awakes =

Musical composition for solo viola

Ulysses Awakes (after Monteverdi) is a musical composition for solo viola and strings by English composer John Woolrich. It is a creative transcription of Ulysses's first aria in act 1, scene 7 of Claudio Monteverdi's opera Il ritorno d'Ulisse in patria. Ulysses has been washed up on the coast of Ithaca, his homeland.

Am I sleeping or awake?
And what country surrounds me?

'It's a powerfully effective piece, which manages to be utterly faithful to the spirit of Monteverdi and yet entirely part of Woolrich's musical world, too.'

Ulysses Awakes was commissioned by Dartington International Summer School and first performed there by Clare Finnimore and the Guildhall String Ensemble on August 11, 1989.

== Instrumentation ==
The composition consists of a solo viola with 6 violins, 1 viola, 2 cellos, and 1 double bass.

== Discography ==
- Jane Atkins (viola); John Lubbock (conductor); Orchestra of St John's, Smith Square; ASV (1998); Black Box Classics 1091 (2004)
- Simon Rowland-Jones (viola); 12 Ensemble; Sancho Panza Records SPANCD001(2018)

== Bibliography ==
- Robert Philip Performing Music in the Age of Recording (Yale University Press 2004)
- John Wenham and Richard Wistreich (editors) The Cambridge Companion to Monteverdi (Cambridge University Press 2008)
