= Stephan Leitzinger =

Stephan Leitzinger is a manufacturer of bassoons and bocals based in Hösbach, Germany.

Leitzinger was an apprentice at Wilhelm Heckel GmbH before working in Paris and then establishing his own business in 1989.

Numerous professional bassoonists play Leitzinger® bassoons.
