= Johann Adam Heckel =

German musical instrument maker (1812–1877)

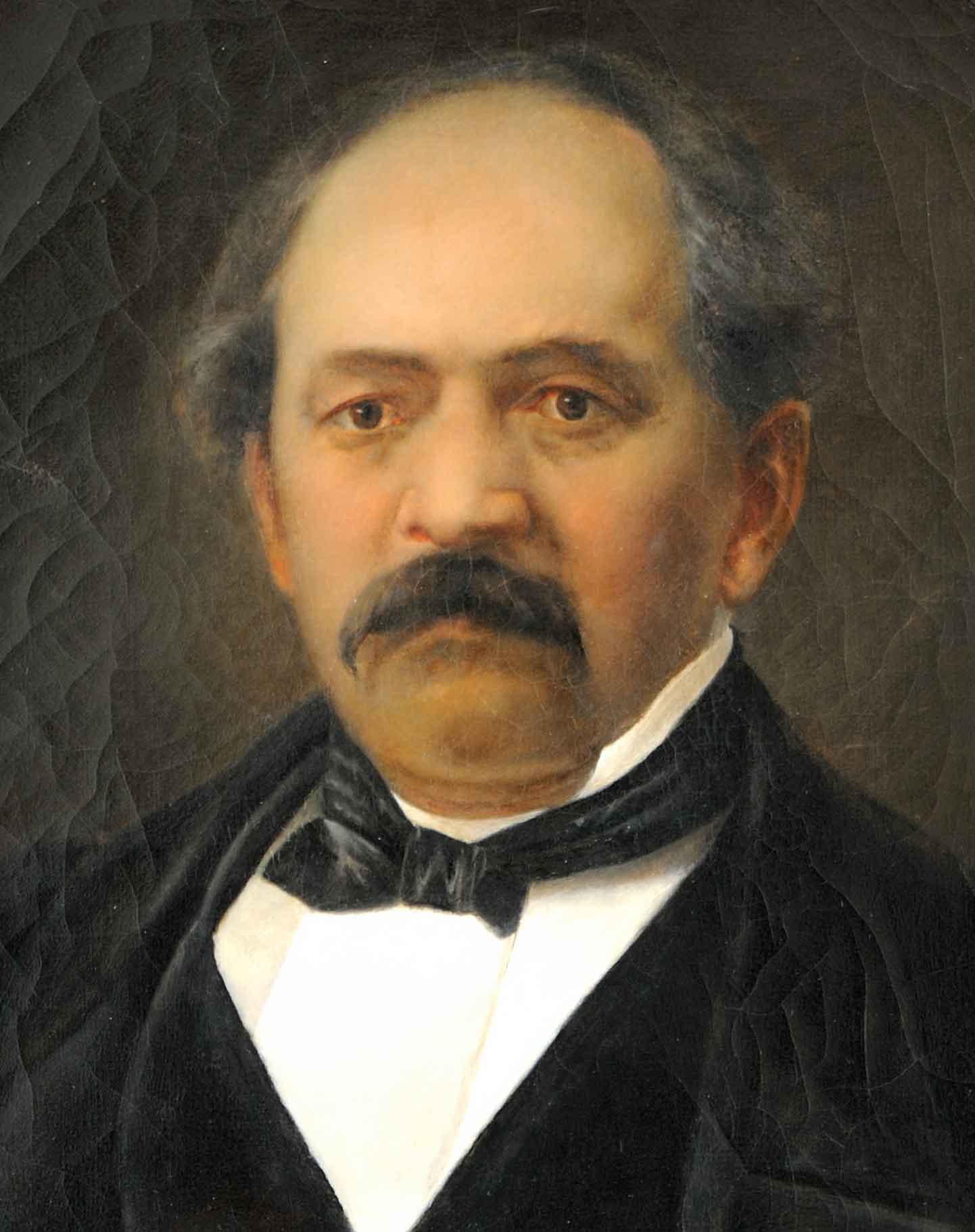
- Heckel, c. 1870
- Born: 14 July 1812; Adorf, Saxony, Germany
- Died: 13 April 1877 (aged 64); Biebrich, Hesse, Germany
- Occupation: Musical instrument maker
- Known for: Wilhelm Heckel GmbH

Johann Adam Heckel (14 July 1812 in Adorf – 13 April 1877 in Biebrich) was a German instrument maker. He founded his family firm in Wiesbaden-Biebrich in 1831 and became the foremost German bassoon maker, making many improvements to the instrument. His company, Wilhelm Heckel GmbH, is still regarded as one of the top makers of bassoons in the world today. The company also makes contrabassoons and heckelphones.
