= Tenoroon =

Woodwind instrument of the bassoon family

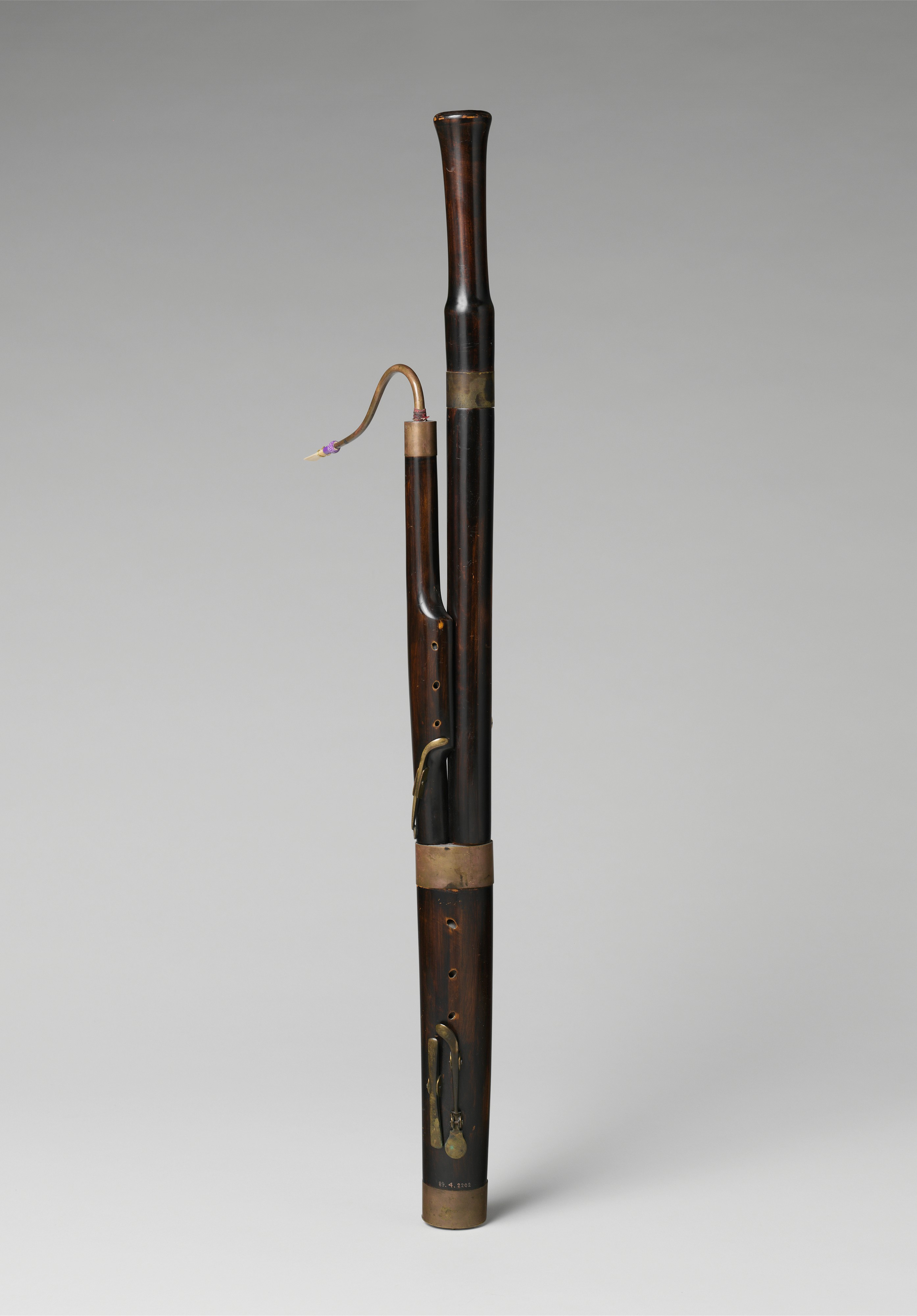
- Tenoroon, c. 1820

Woodwind instrument
- Classification: Wind; Woodwind; Double reed
- Hornbostel–Sachs classification: 422.112 (Double-reeded aerophone with keys)

Related instruments
- Bassoon; Contrabassoon; Contraforte; Semi-contrabassoon; Tenoroon

The tenor bassoon or tenoroon is a member of the bassoon family of double reed woodwind instruments. Similar to the alto bassoon, also called octave bassoon, it is relatively rare.

== Nomenclature ==
Many debates have been had on the nomenclature of the smaller bassoons. All small bassoons have at one time or another been called fagottino (pl. fagottini), but this term is historically usually only applied to the octave bassoon. The terms quart-bassoon (Quartfagott) and quint-bassoon (Quintfagott) are applied respectively to the instruments pitched a fourth above and a fifth above the normal bassoon. To add to the confusion, these terms can also be applied to instruments a fifth lower (quint-bassoon in F) and a fourth lower (quart-bassoon in G) known as semi-contrabassoons. Note that the keys of the lower and higher versions are reversed. Often the terms bass and tenor or high are added to clarify which instrument one is talking about, e.g. quart-bass bassoon or high quint-bassoon (Hochquintfagott). One of the most common terms used to describe these instruments is the term tenoroon which is a contraction of "tenor bassoon", which is the more correct title of the instrument although tenoroon is quite accepted nowadays. Altoon (the combination of the words alto and bassoon), as a moniker for the smaller octave bassoon, has yet to catch on. A recently introduced alternative is the fagonello which is of similar size and weight to these smaller bassoons, but plays at the normal pitch, albeit with a slightly reduced range.

== History ==
First Heckel-system tenoroon by Guntram Wolf, 1989

During the Renaissance, instruments were made in every size available, from sopranos, sopraninos, and garkleins down to bass, great bass, and contrabass. The bassoon (or more properly in this era, the dulcian or curtal) was to be found in at least six sizes. The larger sizes, the bass, and the great bass were more popular, but the smaller sizes were still used, being found in several of Heinrich Schütz's motets; they were also quite popular in Spain, where they were known as "bajoncillos". Smaller bassoons appeared throughout the later Baroque and Classical eras, although their exact use is somewhat clouded. It is true that virtually no literature exists for the smaller bassoons. A notable exception is a partita by Johann Kaspar Frost (not Trost, as sometimes listed) which is scored for two octave bassoons, two tenor bassoons, two bassoons, and two horns. It seems that this was exactly the situation during the nineteenth century. Such notable names as Carl Almenräder advocated the use of the smaller bassoons for teaching purposes and it is said that Jancourt would often perform solos on one during recitals. Hector Berlioz lamented its non-use in his Treatise on Instrumentation and even specified that his perfect orchestra would contain five tenor bassoons (though he never wrote for the instrument himself).

In the late nineteenth century, several improved models of tenor bassoon were unveiled in Paris, but were not very well received, as the real need at the time was a working contrabassoon (and not the sarrusophone that was currently in use). But the tenor bassoon was eventually used, despite its obscurity. After an absence of about one hundred years, the tenor bassoon made its comeback in 1989 when Guntram Wolf of Kronach made the first modern, Heckel system tenor bassoon. Since that reintroduction the tenor bassoon has flourished, being used as a children's instrument in Germany (and in locales all over the world) and is being looked at by professionals as a serious instrument worthy of use.

== Manufacturers ==
In many regards the smaller bassoons play much like the full-size bassoon. Currently there are three sizes available from four different makers. [Moosmann makes an instrument in F (a fourth higher than the normal bassoon) with simplified fingerings that descend only to low C and is intended for young children. The company Bassetto in Switzerland produces instruments in G (a fifth higher) and has an added bonus of a model with an altissimo vent in the bocal, but no whisper key. Bruno Salenson in Nîmes in France is producing a petit basson in E-flat with simplified French or German keywork, specifically for children. Howarth of London markets instruments designed and manufactured by Guntram Wolf both in F and in G (respectively called by the company "tenoroon" and "mini-bassoon"). Guntram Wolf makes and sells his own F and G models, plus an octave bassoon one full octave higher than the normal bassoon. He also offers all three instruments with extra keywork for professional players: the F and G instruments having a full whisper key mechanism and F–F♯ link; and the octave bassoon (called "Fagottino" by Wolf) can have up to nine keys, adding a wing speaker key, and C♯, B♭, F♯, and low E♭ keys to the basic children's model. By far the most used of these would appear to be the Wolf instruments: the model in G or quint-bassoon is marketed more toward children as its slightly smaller size suits them better, while the F or quart-bassoon is more suited to older children or professionals due to its slightly bigger size as well as its feeling and sounding more like a full-sized bassoon, although in its basic children's model it has limited professional use due to the lack of full modern keywork and indeed some professional players using this instrument have opted to have alternative F♯ and G♯ keys added to Wolf's professional instrument (standard features on the regular bassoon) to facilitate the playing of more advanced music.

== Octave bassoon ==
Instruments pitched an octave above the bassoon are, like all smaller bassoons, historically quite old instruments. Virtually no literature exists for this size of bassoon other than a partita by Frost (or Trost?) and a cantata by Zachau (which specifies "Bassonetti" which would appear to be small bassoons). The instrument has enjoyed something of a revival in the past decade. Once again both historically accurate copies and modern instruments are being constructed. The modern instruments are very simple in their fingering, needing only four keys (although as many of nine or more can be had), considerably fewer keys than the original bassoon. The instrument is not, however, fully chromatic. It lacks the bottom B♮ and C♯, which is akin to Baroque and Classical instruments. This instrument is not a remedy for high notes on the bassoon nor can it extend the range considerably. The octave bassoon can generally only reach the written F above the bass clef (but sounding an octave higher) although professionals may be able to extend this range. The sound is thin and would not be out of place in a Renaissance or Baroque wind ensemble. Due to the somewhat smaller size and abundance of cross-fingerings, technique on the octave bassoon may be somewhat challenging for a non-professional. Octave bassoons (alto bassoons) have been made in various keys, D, D♭ (an octave above the lowest and largest tenoroon), and C.

== Tenor bassoons ==
The tenor bassoon is a historically very old instrument evolved from the tenor dulcian or curtal. There is virtually no literature for the instrument aside from a few pieces written in the late Baroque by relatively obscure composers (namely a work by Frost). An old theory that the exposed English horn part in Rossini's overture to his opera William Tell was originally written for the tenor bassoon (due to its being written in old Italian notation in bass clef) has now been widely debunked. There are also many names by which the instrument is known: tenoroon (a contraction of tenor bassoon), quart- and quint-bassoon (the former for the instrument in F and the latter for the one in G), fagottino, and mini-bassoon. Tenor bassoons have been made in many various keys: D♭, E♭, F, and G. Only the E♭, F and G instruments are currently available. Many times these smaller instruments are used for young children to begin on, as the normal-sized bassoon would be far too large for anyone under about the age of 10. Naturally, due to the smaller size of the instrument, the tone is much lighter and reedier than that of the bassoon. The instruments are remarkably quick in response and with some practice one could have faster technique on the tenor bassoon. Most tenor bassoons have a somewhat simplified fingering system with most of the alternate keys on the butt joint removed for space reasons. A light and narrow bassoon reed is preferred on the tenor bassoon so that a wholly different reed is not needed. However, a shorter and narrower reed will tend to favor the higher notes. The upper-register fingerings are somewhat different from the bassoon and in scale it can only ascend to B♭ (although their response is questionable, a B and C, and even C♯ and D, are possible). In general professionals prefer the F instrument as it feels and responds more like a bassoon while the smaller G instrument is used more for children.

The sound of the tenor bassoon can be compared to that of a dull English horn and has been described as somewhat saxophone-like. It can make an excellent tenor or alto voice in a wind ensemble or orchestra (the latter could benefit from having a true tenor instrument in the woodwind department). It could effectively bridge the octave (or octave and a half if bass oboe is omitted) gap between the bassoon family and the oboe family. Although it does not effectively extend the range of the bassoon, it can be used to give more flexibility in that range where the bassoon lacks in mobility. The D♭ tenoroon (also called D♭ bassoon) (6 fingers sound A♭)'s sounding range is from B_{1} to B_{4} (C♭_{2} to C♭_{5}), the E♭ tenoroon (6 fingers sound B♭)'s sounding range is from D♭_{2} to D♭_{5}, the F tenoroon (6 fingers sound C)'s sounding range is from E♭_{2} to E♭_{5} and the G tenoroon (6 fingers sound D)'s sounding range is from F_{2} to F_{5}.

=== Notable works ===
- Johann Kaspar Frost (Trost?) – Parthia No. IV for 2 horns in C, 2 octave bassoons, 2 tenor bassoons in F and 2 bassoons
- Victor Bruns – Sonatina for tenor bassoon in F and piano, Op. 96
- Victor Bruns – Trio for tenor bassoon in F, bassoon and contrabassoon, Op. 97, dedicated to William Waterhouse
- Timothy Raymond – "Lost Music" for tenor bassoon in F and piano (1992)
- Bret Newton – "Osiris: Lord of the Duat", symphonic poem for solo tenor bassoon in F and orchestra (2005)
- Bret Newton – "Forest Scenes" for tenor bassoon in F and 3 marimbas (2006)
- Robert Harvey – "Runes" for tenor bassoon in F and piano (2009)
- Graham Waterhouse – "The Akond of Swat" for tenor bassoon in F, bassoon and piano (2009)
- Elliott Schwartz – "Tenor Variations" for tenor bassoon in F and piano (2013)
- Vincenzo Toscano – "Prosopon" for tenor bassoon in G, 2 bassoons and contrabassoon (2018)
- Carla Magnan – "Il magnifico canocchiale" for 2 tenor bassoons in G, bassoon and contrabassoon (2018)
