= Eugène Louis-Marie Jancourt =

French bassoonist, composer, and pedagogue

Eugène Louis-Marie Jancourt (15 December 1815 – 29 January 1901) was a French bassoonist, composer, and pedagogue. A virtuoso bassoonist and teacher at the Paris Conservatoire, Jancourt is mostly known for his method books and the system innovations he made to the "Buffet" style bassoon. He, along with his contemporary and fellow bassoonist Julius Weissenborn, is considered by many scholars to be one of the most important bassoonists of the 19th century.

== Biography and playing career ==
Jancourt was born in Château-Thierry, France on December 15, 1815. He grew up surrounded by music and began formally studying flute at age eight. Throughout his childhood he also learned violin and clarinet before switching to the bassoon because he was "impressed by the timbre and character" of the instrument. He proved to be very capable at the instrument and was soon accepted into the Paris Conservatoire at the age of nineteen. His teacher, François René Gebauer, gave Jancourt one of his own bassoons after he saw the terrible condition that Jancourt's bassoon was in. Afterwards, he went on to win the Conservatoire competition in only his second year. Once he graduated in 1837, Jancourt free-lanced in Paris, playing in concerts at the Hôtel de Ville, the Athénée Royal, and the Concert-Rooms of Hertz, Érard, and Pleyel, before he was appointed the principal bassoon position with the l'Orchestre de l'Opéra-Comique. His playing was said to have been known for its "purity and for a charm of which, in its resemblance to the human voice, avoided all elements of the grotesque." It was during this time that Jancourt began composing solo works for the bassoon although it had not yet been recognized as a solo instrument. Between 1843 and 1869, Jancourt attained a principal bassoon position with the Théâtre Italien, the bandmaster position with the 5th Subdivision of the la Garde nationale, and became a member of the Société des Concerts du Conservatoire, a membership he would hold for 30 years. He also traveled and toured in London, Italy, and France while never straying too far away from his native Paris. It was, however, during the 1840s that Jancourt's composing really blossomed. He became a very prolific composer and wrote mostly bassoon "concert pieces that are very beautiful and still a joy to perform." His last appearance as a performer came in 1877 in Angers, France. Once he concluded his performing career, Jancourt became a renowned teacher at the Paris Conservatoire in 1875, his former school. He would remain at the conservatory until 1891 when he retired and continued to make improvements to the bassoon in its mechanical deficiencies. Eugène Jancourt died on January 29, 1901, in Boulogne-ser-Seine at the age of 85.

== The Buffet-style bassoon ==
While teaching at the Paris Conservatoire, Jancourt dedicated his time to composing and modifying the bassoon in its form at the time to make it a more reliable solo instrument. Working along with his colleagues Louis Auguste Buffet, Frédéric Triébert, and Pierre Goumas, Jancourt made several key contributions to the improvement of the French bassoon that are still in use today. Among the many advancements they made to the bassoon, the most important ones were: exchanging the former key saddles for rod keys and pillars, adding the whisper key, enabling low register notes to be played much more softly and easily, replacing various keys with ring mechanisms triggered by the fingers to give the notes more security, better intonation, and avoiding large finger motions while working the keys. They also rebuilt the bassoon with 22 keys, a more mathematically calculated ore to produce the best sound, adding 22 new trills. The smaller bore used in the construction of the French bassoon also allowed for the higher register to resonate better, allowing French composers more flexibility. Maurice Ravel, Henri Tomasi, André Jolivet, and Alexandre Tansman are prime examples. They officially published their new alterations in Jancourt's Etude du Basson perfectionné à anneaux mobiles, plateau et 22 Clés comprenant des Exercices pour l'emploi des nouvelles Clés, Op. 58. These modifications helped renovate the instrument and create what is now the modern French bassoon. Although today the use of the Jancourt-Buffet system bassoon has become less frequent outside France many French bassoonists only use this model.

== Pedagogy ==
Besides being a well-known performer, Jancourt became the most prolific bassoon composer of all time, publishing 119 works and writing many method and technique books to help develop the bassoon as a solo instrument. His most famous method book, the Grande methode theorique et pratique, Op. 15, helped to establish himself as the leading bassoon pedagogue at the time. His oeuvre comprises entirely bassoon concert pieces and etude books that demonstrate the bassoon's capabilities. This became, and remains, as one of the most complete and well documented bassoon tutors for the bassoon, emphasizing tone vibrato and embellishment along with fundamental technique. Among his many works for the bassoon, Jancourt was well known for writing transcriptions of other pieces to make them adaptable for the bassoon. For example, he used a theme from the Allegretto of Beethoven's Symphony No. 7 as root for a work he wrote for bassoon and piano. His Grande methode is widely recognized as the most expansive and detailed bassoon tutors ever written and is still used today.

== Works ==
=== Solo Bassoon ===
- 1st Air varie, Op. 1
- Variations for solo bassoon and piano, Op. 2
- 3rd Air varie, Op. 3
- Fantasie sure Lucie de Lamermoor, Op. 4
- Fantasie & Theme varie, Op. 5
- Concertino in La majeur, Op. 8
- Cavatine sur Anna Bolena, Op. 9
- 4th Air varie, Op. 10
- Fantasie sur la Norma, Op. 11
- Concertino d’apres Ferdinand David, Op. 12
- Variations brillantes sur un Theme de Carafa, Op. 14
- Methode Theorique et Pratique en 3 parties adoptee au Conservatoire National de Musique et de Declamation, Op. 15
- Cavatine de la Muette, Op. 18
- Souvenirs de la Somnanbula, Op. 21
- Cavatine sur Lucie de Lamermoor, Op. 22
- Premiere Solo, Op. 23
- 6th Fantasie, Op. 24
- 6 Melodies en 2 suites, Op. 25
- Air varie facile, Op. 28
- Melange sur des Melodies de Haas, Op. 29
- Souvenirs de l’Italie, Op. 30
- 2nd Fantasie sur Lucie de Lamermoor, Op. 35
- Fanatsie sur Don Juan, Op. 50
- 6 Melodies d’apres Mr. Decourcelle, Op. 51
- Solo #2, Op. 52
- Solo #3, Op. 53
- Solo #4, Op. 54
- Mosaique sur Guillaumme Tell, Op. 55
- Grande etude parcourant 18 tons principeaux de la gamme & suivie de deux etude complementaire, Op. 56
- Solo #5, Op. 57
- Etude du Basson perfectionne, Op. 58
- Cantilene, Op. 59
- Cavatine de Mercadante (Di dona Caritea), Op. 60
- Reverie, Op. 61
- Solo #6, Op. 66
- Air du Caid (Ambroise Thomas), Op. 68
- Cavatine du Comte Ory, Op. 69
- Air de Robert le Diable, Op. 70
- Fantasie sur les Huguenots, Op. 71
- Fantasie sur Il Trovatore, Op. 72
- Souvenirs d’Il Trovatore, Op. 73
- Grande Fantasie dur la Favorite, Op. 74
- Grande Fantasie sur la Juive, Op. 75
- Sonate Pathetique, Op. 76
- Romance, Op. 77
- 3 Melodies, Op. 78
- Etude Melodique en sib mineur, Op. 79
- 5th Air varie, Op. 84
- Mosaique sur le Prophete, Op. 89
- Variations faciles pour Basson, Op. 95
- Solo #7, Op. 99
- Solo #8, Op. 100
- Etude melodique en mib, Op. 111
- Romance sans paroles en La majeur, Op. 113
- Fantasie-Caprice, Op. 114
- Etude caracteristique, Op. 117
- Concertino en La majuer, Op. 118
- Etude in mi minuer, Op. 119

=== Duos ===
- Duo concertant for bassoon and piano, Op. 6
- Fantasie concertante sur la Norma for oboe and bassoon, Op. 7
- Fantasie sur la Norma for clarinet and bassoon, Op. 12bis
- Allegretto de la Symphonie en La de Beethoven for piano and bassoon, Op. 13
- Duo concertante sur l’Italienne a Alger for oboe and bassoon, Op. 16
- Fantasie concertante sur la Somnambula for clarinet and bassoon, Op. 26
- Concertino d’apres Meefessel, oboe and bassoon, Op. 40 on YouTube
- Fantasie concertante sur Semiramide for oboe and bassoon, Op. 48
- Duo concertante sur Colette for piano and bassoon, Op. 50bis
- Fantasie d’apres Gattermann for oboe and bassoon, Op. 63
- Soirees musicales de Rossini for oboe and piano, Op. 64
- Trois Duos concertants pour 2 bassons, Op. 65
- Duo ser les 2 Reines (de Manpou) for bassoon and oboe, Op. 67
- 24 Exercices melodiques faciles en 2 suites avec accompagnement de 2nd Basson ou Violoncelle, Op. 98
