= Wilhelm Heckel GmbH =

German woodwind musical instrument manufacturer

- Type: Private
- Founded: 1831; 195 years ago
- Founder: Johann Adam Heckel
- Headquarters: Wiesbaden, Germany
- Website: heckel.de

Wilhelm Heckel GmbH, also known simply as Heckel, is a manufacturer of woodwind instruments based in Wiesbaden, Germany. It is best known for its bassoons, which are considered some of the finest available in the world. The company was established in 1831 by the instrument maker Johann Adam Heckel. It remains a family-owned business to this day.

Heckel is also renowned for its production of contrabassoons and heckelphones, a low oboe family instrument which they invented at the suggestion of opera composer Wagner. In 1879, Wagner approached Wilhelm and shared his desire for a low double reed to bridge the tonal gap between the cor anglais and bassoon. Wilhelm and his sons brought Wagner's idea to fruition in 1904, and the heckelphone was used to great effect by Richard Strauss, who features it prominently in his operas Salome (1905) and Elektra (1909). Although completed after Wagner's death, the instrument has also been featured in modern productions of Wagner's operas, such as in Parsifal under direction of maestro Eberhard Kloke in 2016.

Formerly, Heckel also produced a limited number of other oboe family instruments, including oboes, cors anglais, piccolo heckelphones, and heckel-clarinas. Heckel produced less than a hundred modern conservatoire system instruments between 1933 and 1971, making them extremely rare.

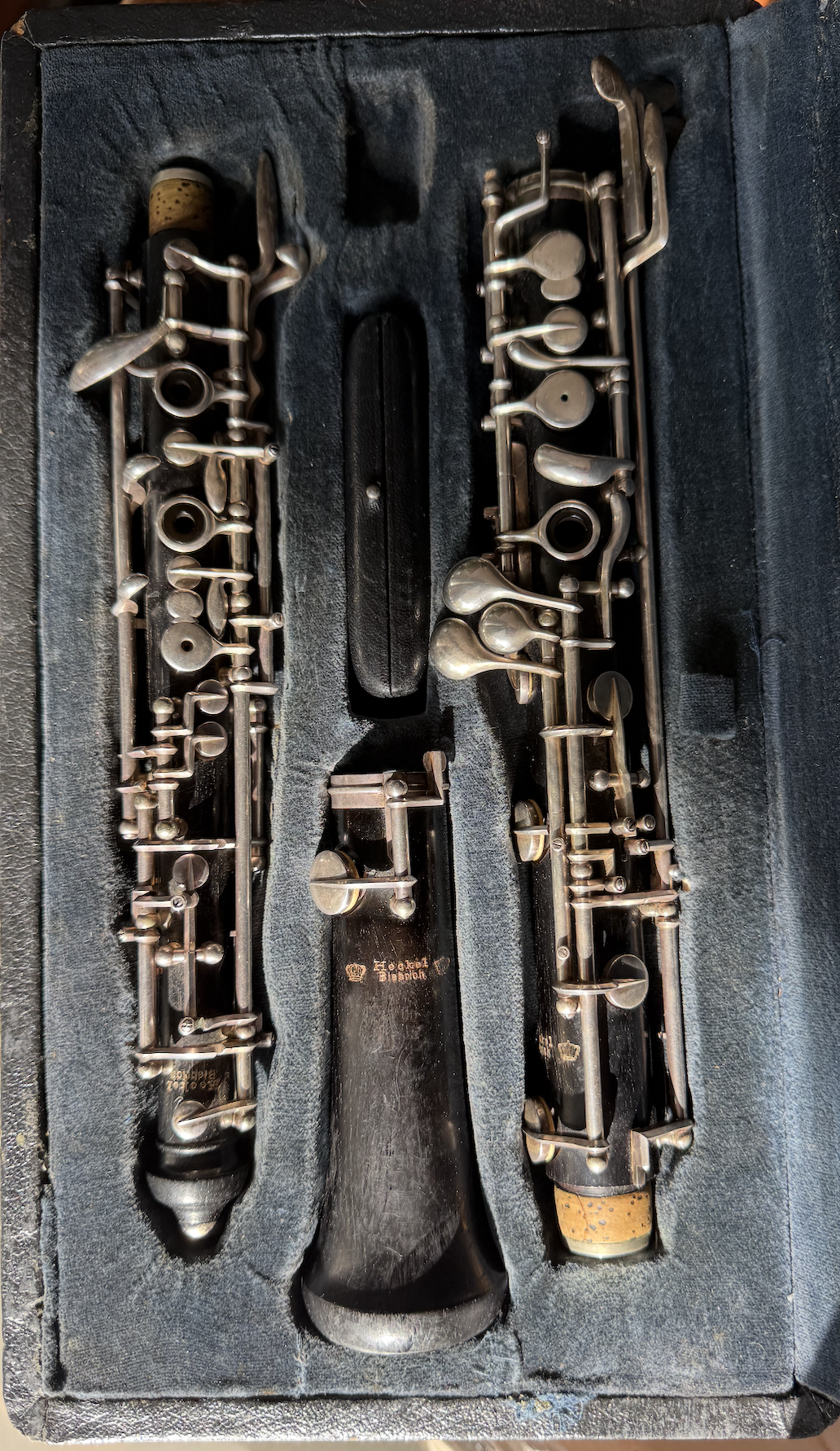
