= Catharine Young (journalist) =

British journalist (1826-1908)

- Born: 1826
- Died: December 15, 1908 (aged 81–82); Willesden, London, England
- Occupation: Journalist
- Employer(s): The Sun; Central Press
- Known for: One of the first women employed on the staff of a British newspaper
- Parent: Murdo Young
- Relatives: Ann Young (sister); Floremma Young (sister)

Catharine Young (1826 – 15 December 1908) was a British journalist. Young was one of the first women to work on the staff of a newspaper, doing so before Eliza Lynn Lynton, who is often given this position.

== Biography ==
Catharine Young was baptised on 19 November 1826. Young was the second of three daughters of Murdo Young, who developed The Sun into one of the leading London newspapers. She and her younger sister both worked on The Sun; Young did general reporting and wrote leading articles, including one on the Battle of Solferino on 25 June 1859.

She was described as 'a fine young lady of almost masculine appearance’.

After her father sold The Sun in 1862, she joined one of the first news agencies, Central Press, under the management of Edward Spender.

She died on 15 December 1908, at her home in Willesden, London, at the age of 82. Her older sister Ann and younger sister Floremma were also journalists.
