= Contraforte =

Musical instrument

Woodwind instrument
- Hornbostel–Sachs classification: 422.112–71 (Double-reeded aerophone with keys)

Related instruments
- Bassoon; Contrabassoon; Tenoroon; Dulcian

The contraforte (German: Kontraforte) is a proprietary instrument with a range similar to the contrabassoon produced by Benedikt Eppelsheim and Guntram Wolf. It is intended to have improved dynamics and intonation over the distinctive but sometimes reticent sound of the conventional contrabassoon. The contraforte uses a different and wider bore than the contrabassoon to produce a distinct tone; the sound is more even in strength and intonation across registers, remaining quite strong into the high register, unlike a contrabassoon. It also lacks the distinct "rattle" of a contrabassoon, although an appropriate reed design can replicate this effect where desired.

Wolf and Eppelsheim developed an accurate bore taper and precise key works in order to simplify fingerings despite the instrument's large size.

In October 2010, Lewis Lipnick, contrabassoonist for the National Symphony Orchestra in Washington, DC, played it in a performance of Beethoven's Symphony No. 9. According to Lipnick, the other members of the orchestra, who used to make jokes about the sound of his old contrabassoon, praised the sound of the contraforte. As the soloist of the Helsinki Philharmonic Orchestra in February 2012, Lipnick also performed Kalevi Aho's extensive Contrabassoon Concerto on the contraforte, and as a solo instrument, it proved to be superior to the traditional contrabassoon, because of its very wide dynamic range, clear and focused intonation. In September 2021, Georg Friedrich Haas' concertante symphonic poem for violin, contraforte and orchestra was premiered during the annual Beethovenfest Bonn. The part of the contraforte was played by Lorelei Dowling, a member of Klangforum Wien, who is conducting her artistic research at the University of Music and Performing Arts Graz on the question, "How can the contraforte be exploited in the color palette of the 21st century ensemble writing".

== Technical specifications ==
The contraforte has many technical aspects that have not been associated with instruments like the bassoon and contrabassoon.

- The contraforte has a written range from A_{1} to G_{5} (in scientific pitch notation), which sounds as A_{0} to G_{4}.
- Large tone holes allow for a free response and a very large dynamical range.
- The pivot screws lie in synthetic sleeves for silent key actions, and push rods make for easy key action with low friction.
- The half-hole mechanism provides a clean, silent octave for F♯_{3} and G_{3}. There are also well-built automatic octave keys from notes A_{3} to F_{4}.
