= John Woolrich =

English composer

John Woolrich (/ˈwʊlrɪtʃ/ WUUL-ritch; born 1954 in Cirencester) is an English composer.

== Biography ==
Woolrich at first studied English at the University of Manchester, before switching to composition at Lancaster University, where he studied under Edward Cowie.

Woolrich has founded a group (the Composers Ensemble), a festival (Hoxton New Music Days), and has been composer in association with the Orchestra of St John's and the Britten Sinfonia. His collaborations with Birmingham Contemporary Music Group led to his appointment in 2002 as Artist-in-Association. He was guest Artistic Director of the Aldeburgh Festival in 2004 and Associate Artistic Director of the festival from 2005 to 2010. From 2010 to 2013 Woolrich was both Artistic Director of Dartington International Summer School and Professor of Music at Brunel University. From 2013 to 2016 he was Artistic Director of Mirepoix Musique in France. He is currently an Associate Artist of the Gulbenkian Arts Centre, iCCi, University of Kent.

A number of preoccupations thread through his music: the art of creative transcription—Ulysses Awakes, for instance, is a re-composition of a Monteverdi aria, and The Theatre Represents a Garden: Night is based on fragments of Mozart—and a fascination with machinery and mechanical processes, heard in many pieces including The Ghost in the Machine and The Barber's Timepiece.

Throughout the 1990s, Woolrich had a string of orchestral commissions, which resulted in some of his most significant works: his concertos for viola, oboe and cello. A CD of the viola and oboe concertos on the NMC label attracted particular attention and was 'Record of the Week' on BBC Radio 3. Other orchestral pieces written during this period include The Ghost in the Machine, premiered in Japan by Andrew Davis and the BBC Symphony Orchestra, and Si Va Facendo Notte which the Barbican Centre commissioned to celebrate the Mozart European Journey Project.

Recent pieces include Between the Hammer and the Anvil, for the London Sinfonietta, a violin concerto for Carolin Widmann and the Northern Sinfonia, Falling Down, a contrabassoon concerto for Margaret Cookhorn and the City of Birmingham Symphony Orchestra andTo the Silver Bow for Leon Bosch and the Academy of St Martin in the Fields. In 2017 John Woolrich composed ‘That Saying Goodbye at the Edge of the Dark’, a meditation on loss and parting, commissioned by the Portsmouth Grammar School. Most recently Woolrich has composed 'A Book of Inventions', a large-scale set of string quartets, one of which Another Journey Calls was premiered by the Aris Quartet as part of the Birmingham Barber Series and broadcast on 30 March 2023.

He was BBC Radio 3's Composer of the Week in March 2008.

== Selected works ==
- Ulysses Awakes (1989)
- The Ghost in the Machine (1990)
- A Farewell (1992)
- Viola Concerto (1993)
- Oboe Concerto (1996)
- Sestina (1997)
- Cello Concerto (1998)
- A Shadowed Lesson (1999)
- Bitter Fruit (2000)
- Spring in Winter (2001)
- The Elephant from Celebes (2005)
- Going a Journey (2006)
- Violin Concerto (2008)
- Whitel's Ey (2008)
- Falling Down (2009)
- Capriccio (2009)
- Pluck from the Air (2013)
- Call to the Mirrors (2014)
- The Tongs and the Bones (2014)
- To the Silver Bow, a double concerto for viola, bass and strings (2014)
- The Voices (2014)
- That saying goodbye at the edge of the dark (2016)
- A Book of Inventions (2016–23)
