= Guntram Wolf =

Guntram Wolf (25 March 1935, Kronach – 4 February 2013, Kronach) was a maker of modern and historical woodwind instruments in Kronach, Germany.

== His productions ==
He specialized in the modern Heckel (German) system bassoon and was one of the better known makers of Wiener (Viennese) oboes. He also made a considerable number of historical instrument replicas of bassoons, oboes and clarinets, as well as child-sized models of the same instruments.

== Innovations ==
Guntram Wolf also developed a redesign of the contrabassoon after an acoustical concept by Benedikt Eppelsheim, called the "Contraforte". The Contraforte was received well in many countries but has a very small following in the United States, with less than a half dozen players of the instrument.

More recently, he and Eppelsheim developed a redesigned bass oboe, called the "Lupophone".
