= Katherine Young (musician) =

American bassoonist and composer

- Young in 2014
- Education: Oberlin College (BA); Wesleyan University (MA); Bienen School of Music (DMA)
- Occupations: Bassoonist; composer
- Employer: Emory University
- Awards: Guggenheim Fellowship (2021)
- Musical career
- Genre: Electro-acoustic music
- Instrument: Bassoon

Katherine Young is an American bassoonist and composer. She released her solo album Further Secret Origins in 2009 and is a 2021 Guggenheim Fellow. She is also a professor at Emory University.

== Biography ==
Katherine Young studied classical music with the Atlanta Symphony Orchestra's Carl Nitchie, and she studied comparative literature and bassoon at Oberlin College and the Oberlin Conservatory of Music, graduating in 2003. She later obtained her MA in Composition from Wesleyan University, where she studied under Anthony Braxton, and her DMA in Composition from the Bienen School of Music; her doctoral dissertation is Nothing Is as It Appears: Anthony Braxton’s Trillium J.

Young's music involves electroacoustic music and sonic art, and she also plays as a bassoonist in her work. She recorded with Braxton in an album released in 2008. In 2019, she was the featured composer for the sixth season of Basscon's Wasteland festival, with one of her pieces being Arthur Russell's Hiding Your Present From You (1986). Aaron Cohen of the Chicago Tribune noted that she "thrives in unexpected terrain" and that "her basic impulse remains straight-forward". Tamzin Elliott of San Francisco Classical Voice said of Young: "Her vocabulary of string techniques — bowing on the body of the instrument, grinding the bow into the string, playing behind the bridge, etc. — was markedly uniform between the pieces, to the point where I wondered about the intentionality of this similarity."

In 2009, her solo album Further Secret Origins was released. She later did another album in 2012, Pretty Monsters, for her quartet of the same name. Young said that solo recordings are "brutal", noting they leave her with only a sound engineer to record with. She performed as bassoonist in Jessica Pavone's 2024 album Clamor.

Originally teaching at Berklee College of Music and the School of the Art Institute of Chicago, she later became Assistant Professor of Composition at Emory University. In 2021, she was awarded a Guggenheim Fellowship.

Young has been based in Chicago.
