= Bassoon =

Double-reed woodwind instrument

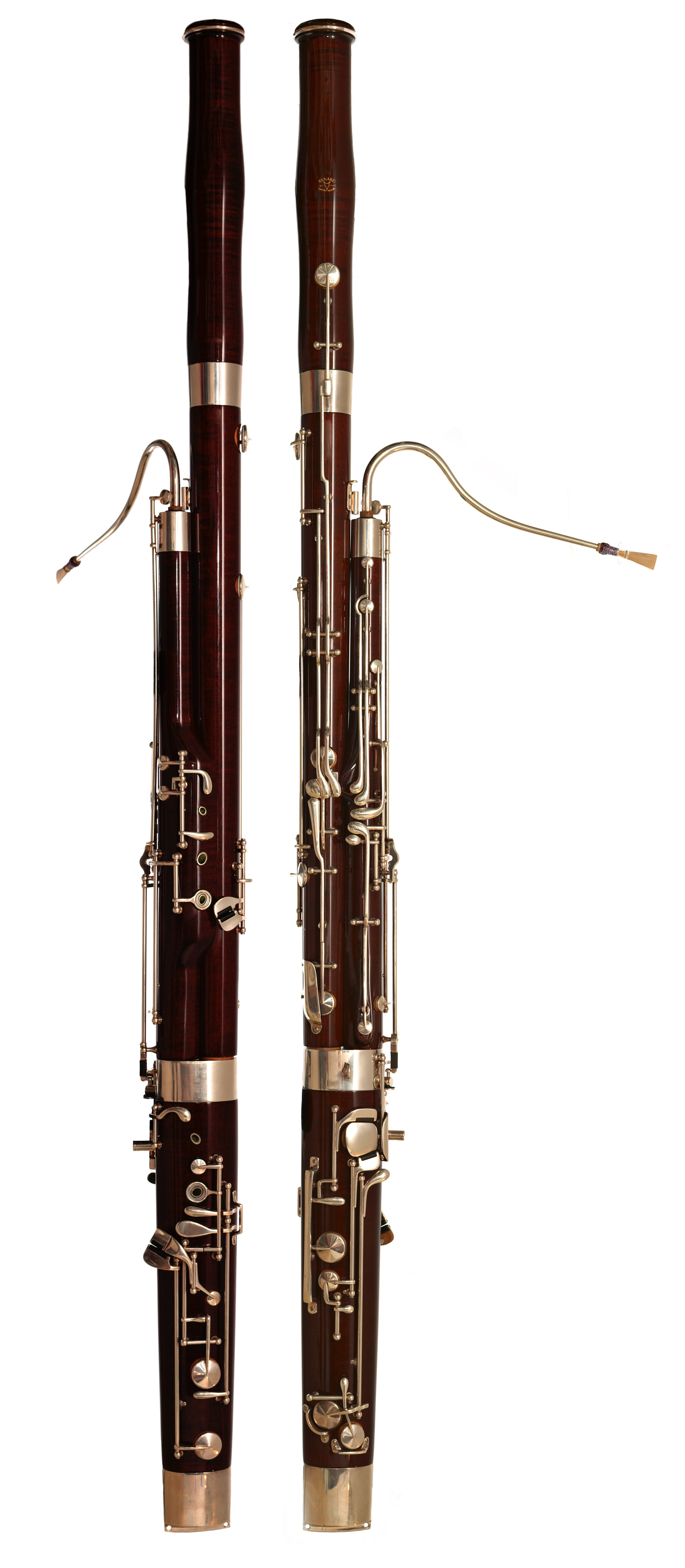
- Renard Artist model 220 bassoon by Fox, front and side views

Woodwind instrument
- Hornbostel–Sachs classification: 422.112–71 (Double-reeded aerophone with keys)
- Developed: Early 18th century

Playing range
- (A_{1}) B♭_{1}–E_{5} (A♭_{5})

Related instruments
- Tenoroon; Contrabassoon (double bassoon); Contraforte; Dulcian; English horn; Oboe

The bassoon is a musical instrument in the woodwind family, which plays in the tenor and bass ranges. It is composed of six pieces, and is usually made of wood. It is known for its distinctive tone color, wide range, versatility, and virtuosity. It is a non-transposing instrument and typically its music is written in the bass and tenor clefs, and sometimes in the treble. There are two forms of modern bassoon: the Buffet (or French) and Heckel (or German) systems; the two have different fingering systems, as well as possessing subtle differences in timbre. It is typically played while sitting using a seat strap, but can be played while standing if the player has a harness to hold the instrument. Sound is produced by rolling both lips over the reed and blowing direct air pressure to cause the reed to vibrate. Its fingering system can be quite complex when compared to those of other instruments. Appearing in its modern form in the 19th century, the bassoon figures prominently in orchestral, concert band, and chamber music literature, and is occasionally heard in pop, rock, and jazz settings as well. One who plays a bassoon is called a bassoonist.

== Etymology ==
The word bassoon comes from French basson and from Italian bassone (basso with the augmentative suffix -one), both terms that refer to the version of any instrument in a bass register. The term for bassoon used in classical music scores and parts is often its Italian name fagotto (plural fagotti), which referred initially to the dulcian. This word, adopted in many other European languages as fagot, fagote, or in German, Fagott, comes from an Old French word meaning a bundle of sticks. The Scottish Gaelic word for bassoon is torm-fheadan which roughly translates as ‘rumble tube or pipe’

== Characteristics ==
=== Range ===
The range of the bassoon begins at B♭_{1} (the first one below the bass staff) and extends upward over three octaves, roughly to the G above the treble staff (G_{5}). However, most writing for bassoon rarely calls for notes above C_{5.} Stravinsky's opening solo in The Rite of Spring ascends to D_{5}, and Ravel's Piano Concerto calls for E_{5,} but notes this high are seldom written, as they are difficult to produce (often requiring specific reed design features to ensure reliability), and at any rate are quite homogeneous in timbre to the same pitches on the cor anglais, which can produce them with relative ease. French bassoon’s greater facility in the extreme high register means repertoire written for it is somewhat likelier to include very high notes, although modern players of German system can achieve these notes.

Mechanical improvements since its invention gradually expanded the high range of the bassoon. Increasing use of bassoon for tenor lines in the late Baroque saw tenor clef sometimes employed, partly to avoid excessive ledger lines, and by the 20th century treble clef was used as well.

Bassoon part
From Beethoven's Symphony No. 4, 1st movement

Bassoon solo
From Rimsky-Korsakov's Scheherazade

Tu pauperum refugium
Four-bassoon ensemble performing from Josquin des Prez's "Magnus es tu, Domine"

Like other woodwind instruments, the lowest note is fixed, but A_{1} is possible with a special extension to the instrument—see "Extended techniques" below.

Although the mechanism is in F (effectively an octave beneath English horn) the bassoon is non-transposing, meaning that notes sounded match the written pitch, in the same manner as bass recorder.

== Construction ==
Parts of the bassoon

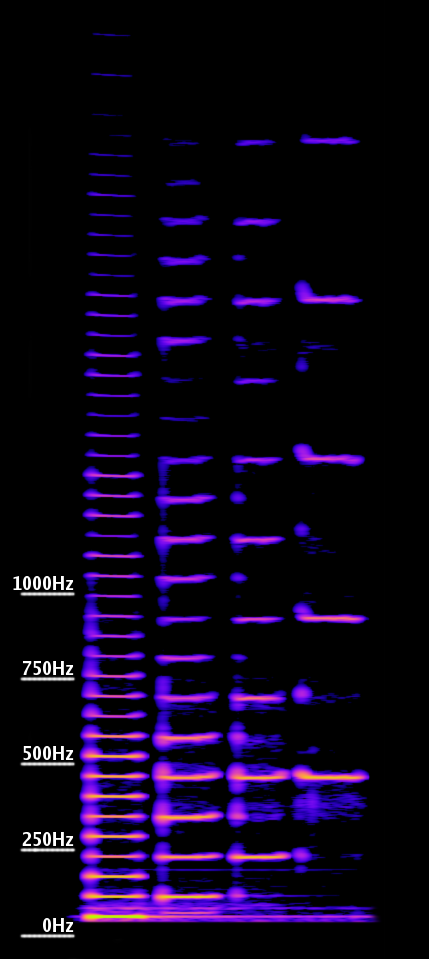
A spectrogram of the bassoon's B♭ in four octaves.

The bassoon disassembles into six main pieces, including the reed. The bell (6), extending upward; the bass joint (or long joint) (5), connecting the bell and the boot; the boot (or butt) (4), at the bottom of the instrument and folding over on itself; the wing joint (or tenor joint) (3), which extends from boot to bocal; and the bocal (or crook) (2), a crooked metal tube that attaches the wing joint to a reed (1).

=== Structure ===
The bore of the bassoon is conical, like that of the oboe and the saxophone, and the two adjoining bores of the boot joint are connected at the bottom of the instrument with a U-shaped metal connector. Both bore and tone holes are precision-machined, and each instrument is finished by hand for proper tuning. The walls of the bassoon are thicker at various points along the bore; here, the tone holes are drilled at an angle to the axis of the bore, which reduces the distance between the holes on the exterior. This ensures coverage by the fingers of the average adult hand. Playing is facilitated by closing the distance between the widely spaced holes with a complex system of key work, which extends throughout nearly the entire length of the instrument. The overall height of the bassoon stretches to 1.34 m (4 ft 5 in) tall, but the total sounding length is 2.54 m (8 ft 4 in) considering that the tube is doubled back on itself. There are also short-reach bassoons made for the benefit of young or petite players.

=== Materials ===
A modern beginner's bassoon is generally made of maple, with medium-hardness types such as sycamore maple and sugar maple preferred. Less-expensive models are also made of materials such as polypropylene and ebonite, primarily for student and outdoor use. Metal bassoons were made in the past but have not been produced by any major manufacturer since 1889.

=== Double reeds ===
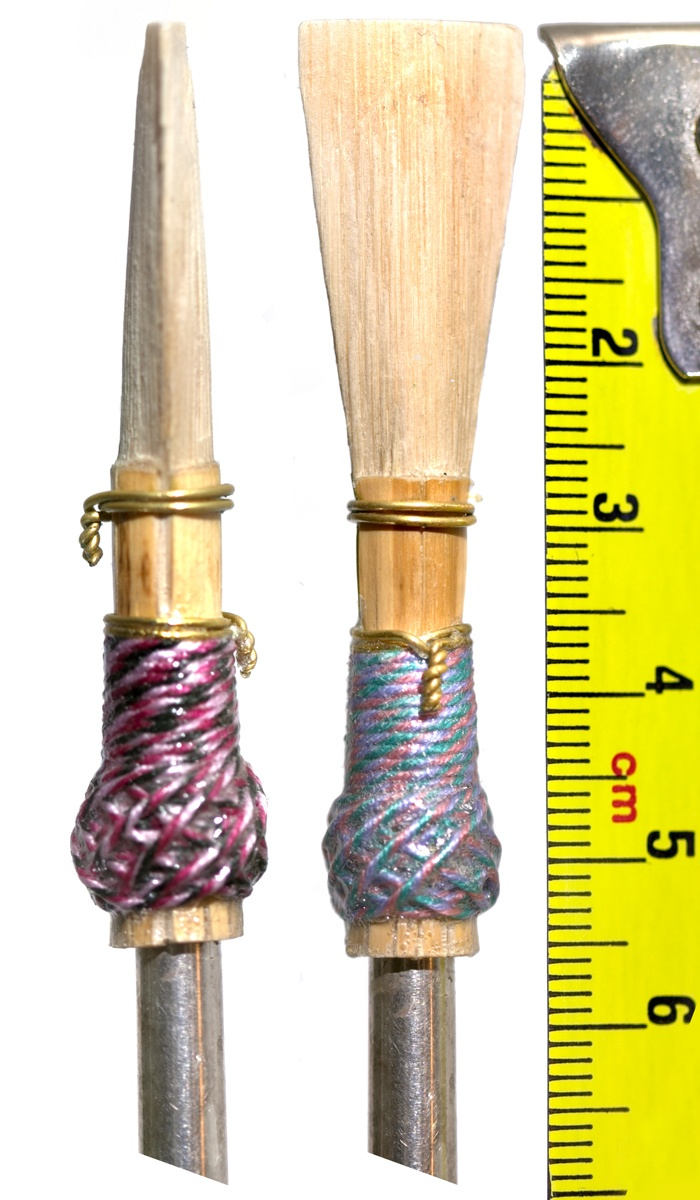
Bassoon reeds are usually around 5.5 cm (2.2 in) in length and wrapped in thread.

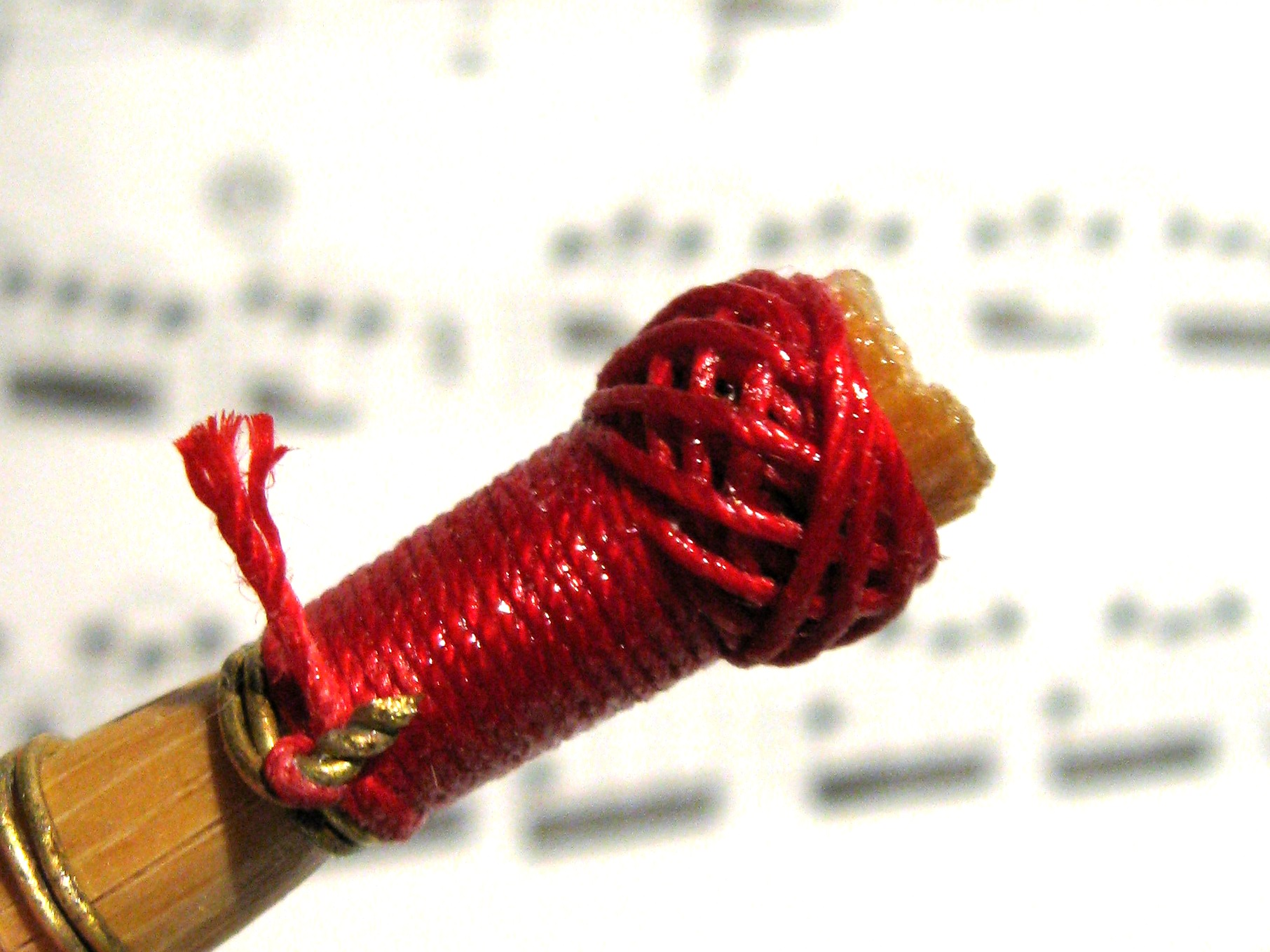
Detail of binding around base of reed.

The art of reed-making has been practiced for several hundred years, some of the earliest known reeds having been made for the dulcian, a predecessor of the bassoon. Current methods of reed-making consist of a set of basic methods; however, individual bassoonists' playing styles vary greatly and thus require that reeds be customized to best suit their respective bassoonist. Advanced players usually make their own reeds to this end. With regards to commercially made reeds, many companies and individuals offer pre-made reeds for sale, but players often find that such reeds still require adjustments to suit their particular playing style.

Modern bassoon reeds, made of Arundo donax cane, are often made by the players themselves, although beginner bassoonists tend to buy their reeds from professional reed makers or use reeds made by their teachers. Reeds begin with a length of tube cane that is split into three or four pieces using a tool called a cane splitter. The cane is then trimmed and gouged to the desired thickness, leaving the bark attached. After soaking, the gouged cane is cut to the proper shape and milled to the desired thickness, or profiled, by removing material from the bark side. This can be done by hand with a file; more frequently it is done with a machine or tool designed for the purpose. After the profiled cane has soaked once again it is folded over in the middle. Prior to soaking, the reed maker will have lightly scored the bark with parallel lines with a knife; this ensures that the cane will assume a cylindrical shape during the forming stage.

On the bark portion, the reed maker binds on one, two, or three coils or loops of brass wire to aid in the final forming process. The exact placement of these loops can vary somewhat depending on the reed maker. The bound reed blank is then wrapped with thick cotton or linen thread to protect it, and a conical steel mandrel (which sometimes has been heated in a flame) is quickly inserted in between the blades. Using a special pair of pliers, the reed maker presses down the cane, making it conform to the shape of the mandrel. (The steam generated by the heated mandrel causes the cane to permanently assume the shape of the mandrel.) The upper portion of the cavity thus created is called the "throat", and its shape has an influence on the final playing characteristics of the reed. The lower, mostly cylindrical portion will be reamed out with a special tool called a reamer, allowing the reed to fit on the bocal.

After the reed has dried, the wires are tightened around the reed, which has shrunk after drying, or replaced completely. The lower part is sealed (a nitrocellulose-based cement such as Duco may be used) and then wrapped with thread to ensure both that no air leaks out through the bottom of the reed and that the reed maintains its shape. The wrapping itself is often sealed with Duco, beeswax, or clear nail varnish (polish). Electrical tape can also be used as a wrapping for amateur reed makers. The bulge in the wrapping is sometimes referred to as the "Turk's head"—it serves as a convenient handle when inserting the reed on the bocal. Alternatively, hot glue, epoxy, or heat shrink wrap may be used to seal the tube of the reed. The thread wrapping (commonly known as a "Turban" due to the criss-crossing fabric) is still more common in commercially sold reeds.

To finish the reed, the end of the reed blank, originally at the center of the unfolded piece of cane, is cut off, creating an opening. The blades above the first wire are now roughly 27–30 mm (1.1–1.2 in) long. For the reed to play, a slight bevel must be created at the tip with a knife, although there is also a machine that can perform this function. Other adjustments with the reed knife may be necessary, depending on the hardness, the profile of the cane, and the requirements of the player. The reed opening may also need to be adjusted by squeezing either the first or second wire with the pliers. Additional material may be removed from the sides (the "channels") or tip to balance the reed. Additionally, if the "e" in the bass clef staff is sagging in pitch, it may be necessary to "clip" the reed by removing 1–2 mm (0.039–0.079 in) from its length using a pair of very sharp scissors or the equivalent.

== History ==
=== Origin ===
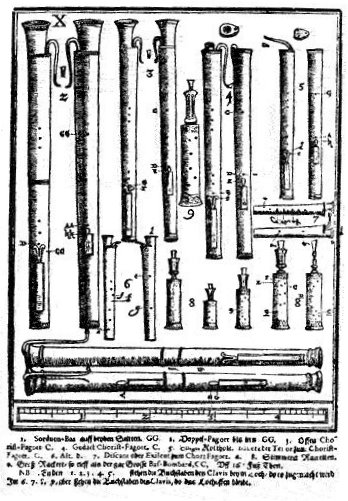
Dulcians and racketts, from the Syntagma musicum by Michael Praetorius.

Music historians generally consider the dulcian to be the forerunner of the modern bassoon, as the two instruments share many characteristics: a double reed fitted to a metal crook, obliquely drilled tone holes and a conical bore that doubles back on itself. The origins of the dulcian are obscure, but by the mid-16th century it was available in as many as eight different sizes, from soprano to great bass. A full consort of dulcians was a rarity; its primary function seems to have been to provide the bass in the typical wind band of the time, either loud (shawms) or soft (recorders), indicating a remarkable ability to vary dynamics to suit the need. Otherwise, dulcian technique was rather primitive, with eight finger holes and two keys, indicating that it could play in only a limited number of key signatures.

Circumstantial evidence indicates that the baroque bassoon was a newly invented instrument, rather than a simple modification of the old dulcian. The dulcian was not immediately supplanted, but continued to be used well into the 18th century by Bach and others; and, presumably for reasons of interchangeability, repertoire from this time is very unlikely to go beyond the smaller compass of the dulcian. The man most likely responsible for developing the true bassoon was Martin Hotteterre (d. 1712), who may also have invented the three-piece flûte traversière (transverse flute) and the hautbois (baroque oboe). Some historians believe that sometime in the 1650s, Hotteterre conceived the bassoon in four sections (bell, bass joint, boot and wing joint), an arrangement that allowed greater accuracy in machining the bore compared to the one-piece dulcian. He also extended the compass down to B♭ by adding two keys. An alternate view maintains Hotteterre was one of several craftsmen responsible for the development of the early bassoon. These may have included additional members of the Hotteterre family, as well as other French makers active around the same time. No original French bassoon from this period survives, but if it did, it would most likely resemble the earliest extant bassoons of Johann Christoph Denner and Richard Haka from the 1680s. Sometime around 1700, a fourth key (G♯) was added, and it was for this type of instrument that composers such as Antonio Vivaldi, Bach, and Georg Philipp Telemann wrote their demanding music. A fifth key, for the low E♭, was added during the first half of the 18th century. Notable makers of the 4-key and 5-key baroque bassoon include J.H. Eichentopf (c. 1678–1769), J. Poerschmann (1680–1757), Thomas Stanesby Jr. (1668–1734), G.H. Scherer (1703–1778), and Prudent Thieriot (1732–1786).

=== Modern configuration ===
Increasing demands on capabilities of instruments and players in the 19th century—particularly larger concert halls requiring greater volume and the rise of virtuoso composer-performers—spurred further refinement. Increased sophistication, both in manufacturing techniques and acoustical knowledge, made possible great improvements in the instrument's playability.

The modern bassoon exists in two distinct primary forms, the Buffet (or "French") system and the Heckel ("German") system. Most of the world plays the Heckel system, while the Buffet system is primarily played in France, Belgium, and parts of Latin America. A number of other types of bassoons have been constructed by various instrument makers, such as the rare Galandronome. Owing to the ubiquity of the Heckel system in English-speaking countries, references in English to the contemporary bassoon always mean the Heckel system, with the Buffet system being explicitly qualified where it appears.

==== Heckel (German) system ====
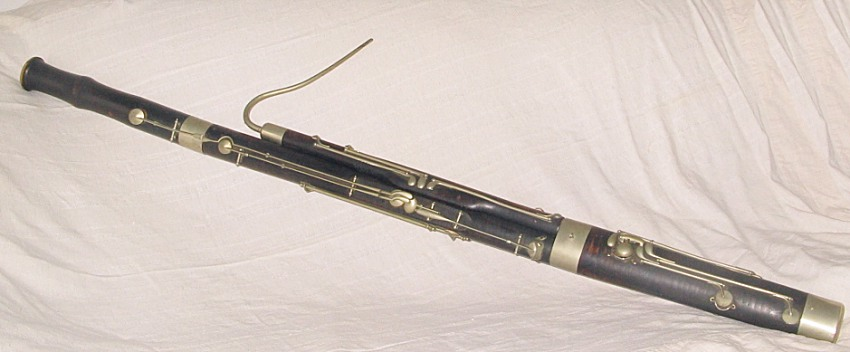
Heckel system bassoon from 1870

The design of the modern bassoon owes a great deal to the performer, teacher, and composer Carl Almenräder. Assisted by the German acoustic researcher Gottfried Weber, he developed the 17-key bassoon with a range spanning four octaves. Almenräder's improvements to the bassoon began with an 1823 treatise describing ways of improving intonation, response, and technical ease of playing by augmenting and rearranging the keywork. Subsequent articles further developed his ideas. His employment at Schott gave him the freedom to construct and test instruments according to these new designs, and he published the results in Caecilia, Schott's house journal. Almenräder continued publishing and building instruments until his death in 1846, and Ludwig van Beethoven himself requested one of the newly made instruments after hearing of the papers. In 1831, Almenräder left Schott to start his own factory with a partner, Johann Adam Heckel.

Heckel and two generations of descendants continued to refine the bassoon, and their instruments became the standard, with other makers following. Because of their superior singing tone quality (an improvement upon one of the main drawbacks of the Almenräder instruments), the Heckel instruments competed for prominence with the reformed Wiener system, a Boehm-style bassoon, and a completely keyed instrument devised by Charles-Joseph Sax, father of Adolphe Sax. F.W. Kruspe implemented a latecomer attempt in 1893 to reform the fingering system, but it failed to catch on. Other attempts to improve the instrument included a 24-keyed model and a single-reed mouthpiece, but both these had adverse effects on tone and were abandoned.

Coming into the 20th century, the Heckel-style German model of bassoon dominated the field. Heckel himself had made over 1,100 instruments by the turn of the 20th century (serial numbers begin at 3,000), and the British makers' instruments were no longer desirable for the changing pitch requirements of the symphony orchestra, remaining primarily in military band use.

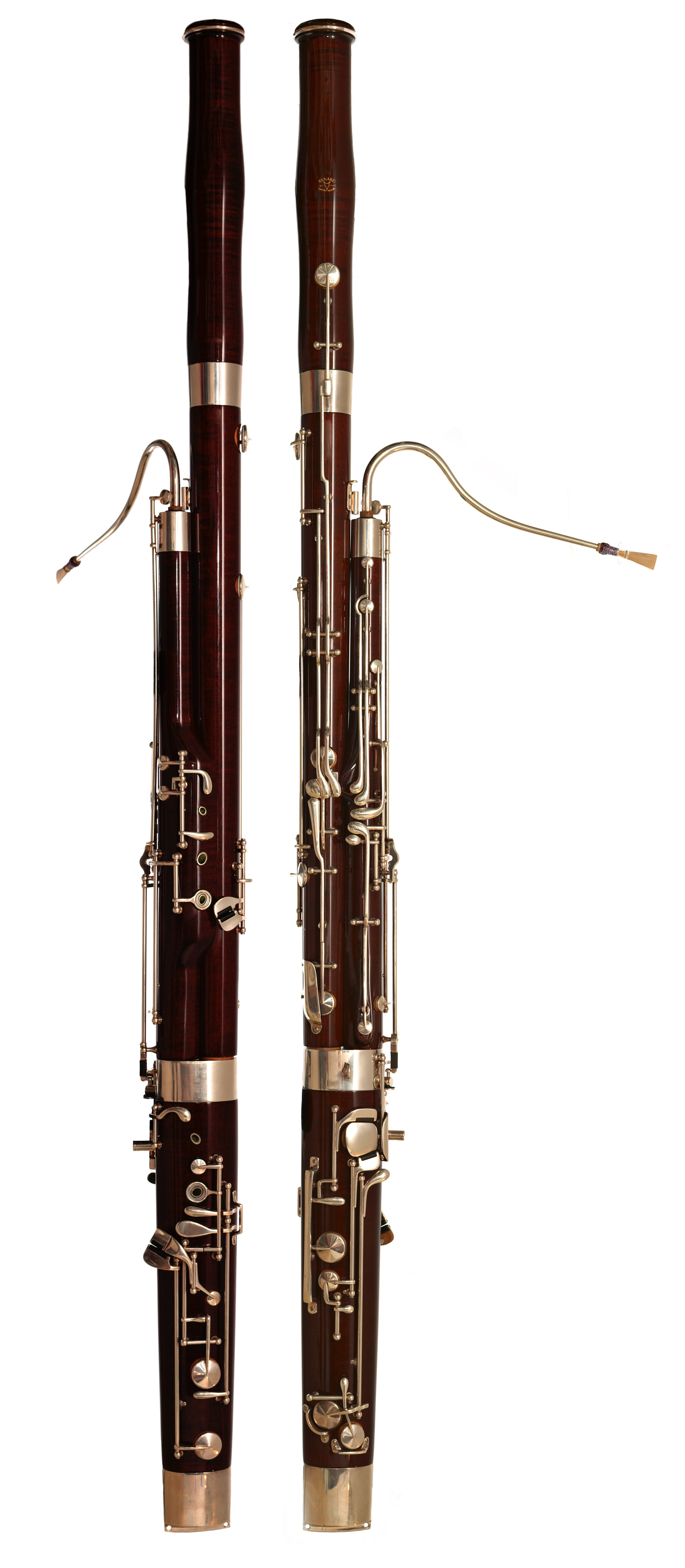
Two views of a Fox model 220 bassoon

Except for a brief 1940s wartime conversion to ball bearing manufacture, the Heckel concern has produced instruments continuously to the present day. Heckel bassoons are considered by many to be the best, although a range of Heckel-style instruments is available from several other manufacturers, all with slightly different playing characteristics.

Because its mechanism is primitive compared to most modern woodwinds, makers have occasionally attempted to "reinvent" the bassoon. In the 1960s, Giles Brindley began to develop what he called the "logical bassoon", which aimed to improve intonation and evenness of tone through use of an electrically activated mechanism, making possible key combinations too complex for the human hand to manage. Brindley's logical bassoon was never marketed.

==== Buffet (French) system ====
The Buffet system bassoon achieved its basic acoustical properties somewhat earlier than the Heckel. Thereafter, it continued to develop in a more conservative manner. While the early history of the Heckel bassoon included a complete overhaul of the instrument in both acoustics and key work, the development of the Buffet system consisted primarily of incremental improvements to the key work. This minimalist approach of the Buffet deprived it of improved consistency of intonation, ease of operation, and increased power, which is found in Heckel bassoons, but the Buffet is considered by some to have a more vocal and expressive quality. The conductor John Foulds lamented in 1934 the dominance of the Heckel-style bassoon, considering them too homogeneous in sound with the horn. The modern Buffet system has 22 keys with its range being the same as the Heckel; although Buffet instruments have greater facility in the upper registers, reaching E_{5} and F_{5} with far greater ease and less air resistance.

Compared to the Heckel bassoon, Buffet system bassoons have a narrower bore and simpler mechanism, requiring different, and often more complex fingerings for many notes. Switching between Heckel and Buffet, or vice versa, requires extensive retraining. French woodwind instruments' tone in general exhibits a certain amount of "edge", with more of a vocal quality than is usual elsewhere, and the Buffet bassoon is no exception. This sound has been utilised effectively in writing for Buffet bassoon, but is less inclined to blend than the tone of the Heckel bassoon. As with all bassoons, the tone varies considerably, depending on individual instrument, reed, and performer. In the hands of a lesser player, the Heckel bassoon can sound flat and woody, but good players succeed in producing a vibrant, singing tone. Conversely, a poorly played Buffet can sound buzzy and nasal, but good players succeed in producing a warm, expressive sound.

Though the United Kingdom once favored the French system, Buffet-system instruments are no longer made there and the last prominent British player of the French system retired in the 1980s. However, with continued use in some regions and its distinctive tone, the Buffet continues to have a place in modern bassoon playing, particularly in France, where it originated. Buffet-model bassoons are currently made in Paris by Buffet Crampon and the atelier Ducasse (Romainville, France). The Selmer Company stopped fabrication of French system bassoons around the year 2012. Some players, for example the late Gerald Corey in Canada, have learned to play both types and will alternate between them depending on the repertoire.

== Use in ensembles ==
=== Ensembles prior to the 20th century ===
==== Pre-1760 ====
Prior to 1760, the early ancestor of the bassoon was the dulcian. It was used to reinforce the bass line in wind ensembles called consorts. However, its use in concert orchestras was sporadic until the late 17th century when double reeds began to make their way into standard instrumentation. Increasing use of the dulcian as a basso continuo instrument meant that it began to be included in opera orchestras, in works such as those by Reinhard Keiser and Jean-Baptiste Lully. Meanwhile, as the dulcian advanced technologically and was able to achieve more virtuosity, composers such as Joseph Bodin de Boismortier, Johann Ernst Galliard, Johann Friedrich Fasch and Georg Philipp Telemann wrote demanding solo and ensemble music for the instrument. Antonio Vivaldi brought it to prominence by featuring it in thirty-nine concerti.

==== c. 1760–1830 ====
While the bassoon was still often used to give clarity to the bassline due to its sonorous low register, the capabilities of wind instruments grew as technology advanced during the Classical era. This allowed the instrument to play in more keys than the dulcian. Joseph Haydn took advantage of this in his Symphony No. 45 ("Farewell Symphony"), in which the bassoon plays in F-sharp minor. Following with these advances, composers also began to exploit the bassoon for its unique color, flexibility, and virtuosic ability, rather than for its perfunctory ability to double the bass line. Those who did this include Ludwig van Beethoven in his three Duos for Clarinet and Bassoon (WoO 27) for clarinet and bassoon and Niccolo Paganini in his duets for violin and bassoon. In his Bassoon Concerto in B♭ major, K. 191, W. A. Mozart utilized all aspects of the bassoon's expressiveness with its contrasts in register, staccato playing, and expressive sound, and was especially noted for its singing quality in the second movement. This concerto is often considered one of the most important works in all of the bassoon's repertoire, even today.

The bassoon's similarity to the human voice, in addition to its newfound virtuosic ability, was another quality many composers took advantage of during the classical era. After 1730, the German bassoon's range expended up to B♭_{4}, and much higher with the French instrument. Technological advances also caused the bassoon's tenor register sound to become more resonant, and playing in this register grew in popularity, especially in the Austro-Germanic musical world. Pedagogues such as Josef Frohlich instructed students to practice scales, thirds, and fourths as vocal students would. In 1829, he wrote that the bassoon was capable of expressing "the worthy, the virile, the solemn, the great, the sublime, composure, mildness, intimacy, emotion, longing, heartfulness, reverence, and soulful ardour." In G.F. Brandt's performance of Carl Maria von Weber's Concerto for Bassoon in F Major, Op. 75 (J. 127) it was also likened to the human voice. In France, Pierre Cugnier described the bassoon's role as encompassing not only the bass part, but also to accompany the voice and harp, play in pairs with clarinets and horns in Harmonie, and to play in "nearly all types of music," including concerti, which were much more common than the sonatas of the previous era. Both Cugnier and Étienne Ozi emphasized the importance of the bassoon's similarity to the singing voice.

The role of the bassoon in the orchestra varied depending on the country. In the Viennese orchestra the instrument offered a three-dimensional sound to the ensemble by doubling other instruments such as violins, as heard in Mozart's overture to The Marriage of Figaro, K 492. where it plays a rather technical part alongside the strings. He also wrote for the bassoon to change its timbre depending on which instrument it was paired with; warmer with clarinets, hollow with flutes, and dark and dignified with violins. In Germany and Scandinavian countries, orchestras typically featured only two bassoons. But in France, orchestras increased the number to four in the latter half of the nineteenth century. In England, the bassoonist's role varied depending on the ensemble. Johann Christian Bach wrote two concertos for solo bassoon, and it also appeared in more supportive roles such as accompanying church choirs after the Puritan revolution destroyed most church organs. In the American colonies, the bassoon was typically seen in a chamber setting. After the Revolutionary War, bassoonists were found in wind bands that gave public performances. By 1800, there was at least one bassoon in the United States Marine Band. In South America, the bassoon also appeared in small orchestras, bands, and military musique (similar to Harmonie ensembles).

==== c. 1830–1900 ====
The role of the bassoon during the Romantic era varied between a role as a supportive bass instrument and a role as a virtuosic, expressive, solo instrument. In fact, it was very much considered an instrument that could be used in almost any circumstance. The comparison of the bassoon's sound to the human voice continued on during this time, as much of the pedagogy surrounded emulating this sound. Giuseppe Verdi used the instrument's lyrical, singing voice to evoke emotion in pieces such as his Messa da Requiem. Eugène Jancourt compared the use of vibrato on the bassoon to that of singers, and Luigi Orselli wrote that the bassoon blended well with human voice. He also noted the function of the bassoon in the French orchestra at the time, which served to support the sound of the viola, reinforce staccato sound, and double the bass, clarinet, flute, and oboe. Emphasis also began to be placed on the unique sound of the bassoon's staccato, which might be described as quite short and aggressive, such as in Hector Berlioz's Symphonie fantastique, Op. 14 in the fifth movement. Paul Dukas utilized the staccato to depict the image of two brooms coming to life in The Sorcerer's Apprentice.

It was common for there to be only two bassoons in German orchestras. Austrian and British military bands also only carried two bassoons, and were mainly used for accompaniment and offbeat playing. In France, Hector Berlioz also made it fashionable to use more than two bassoons; he often scored for three or four, and at time wrote for up to eight such as in his l'Impériale.

At this point, composers expected bassoons to be as virtuosic as the other wind instruments, as they often wrote solos challenging the range and technique of the instrument. Examples of this include Nikolai Rimsky-Korsakov's bassoon solo and cadenza following the clarinet in Sheherazade, Op. 35 and in Richard Wagner's Tannhäuser, which required the bassoonist to triple tongue and also play up to the top of its range at an E_{5}. Wagner also used the bassoon for its staccato ability in his work, and often wrote his three bassoon parts in thirds to evoke a darker sound with noticeable tone color. In Modest Mussorgsky's Night on Bald Mountain, the bassoons play fortissimo alongside other bass instruments in order to evoke "the voice of the Devil."

=== 20th and 21st century ensembles ===
At this point in time, the development of the bassoon slowed. Rather than making large leaps in technological improvements, tiny imperfections in the instrument's function were corrected. The instrument became quite versatile throughout the twentieth century; the instrument was at this point able to play three octaves, a variety of different trills, and maintained stable intonation across all registers and dynamic levels. The pedagogy among bassoonists varied among different countries, and so the overall instrument itself played a variety of roles. As was a common theme in previous eras, the bassoon was valued by composers for its unique voice, and its use rose higher in pitch. A famous example of this is the beginning of Igor Stravinsky's Rite of Spring in which the bassoon plays in its highest register in order to mimic the Ukrainian Dentsivka. Composers also wrote for the bassoon's middle register, such as in Stravinsky's "Berceuse" in The Firebird and Symphony No. 5 in E♭ major, Op. 82 by Jean Sibelius. They also continued to highlight the staccato sound of the bassoon, as heard in Sergei Prokofiev's Humorous Scherzo. In Sergei Prokofiev's Peter and the Wolf, the part of the grandfather is played by the bassoon.

In orchestral settings, most orchestras from the beginning of the twentieth century to the present have three or four bassoonists, with the fourth typically covering contrabassoon as well. Greater emphasis on the use of timbre, vibrato, and phrasing began to appear in bassoon pedagogy, and many followed Marcel Tabuteau's philosophy on musical phrasing. Vibrato began to be used in ensemble playing, depending on the phrasing of the music. The bassoon was, and currently is, expected to be fluent with other woodwinds in terms of virtuosity and technique. Examples of this include the cadenza for bassoons in Maurice Ravel's Rapsodie espagnole and the multi-finger trills used in Stravinsky's Octet.

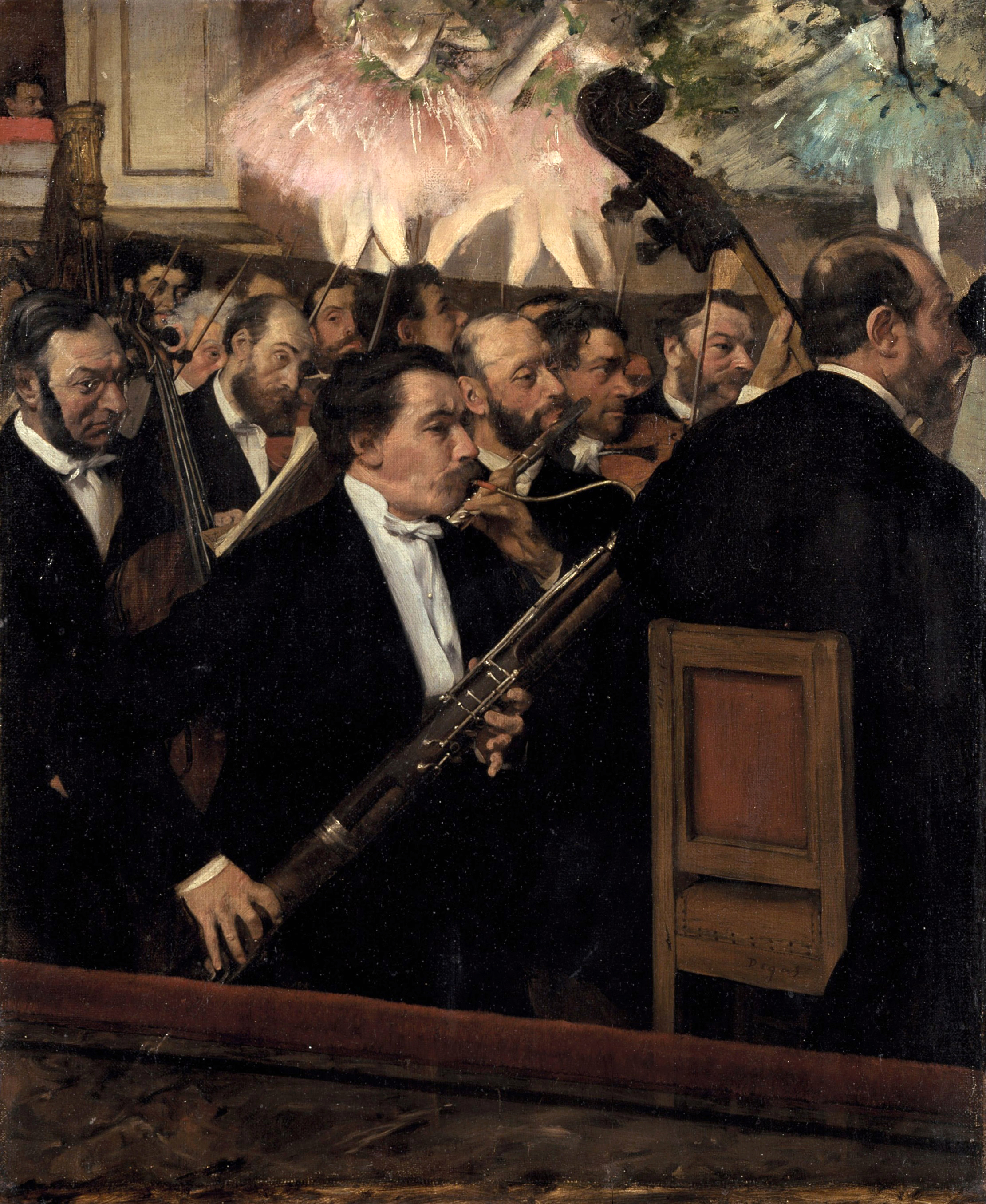
Edgar Degas, L'Orchestre de L'Opera, (1868)

In the twentieth century, the bassoon was less of a concerto soloist, and when it was, the accompanying ensemble was made softer and quieter. In addition, it was no longer used in marching bands, though still existed in concert bands with one or two of them. Orchestral repertoire remained very much the same Austro-Germanic tradition throughout most Western countries. It mostly appeared in solo, chamber, and symphonic settings. By the mid-1900s, broadcasting and recording grew in popularity, allowing for new opportunities for bassoonists, and leading to a slow decline of live performances. Much of the new music for bassoon in the late twentieth and early twenty-first centuries, often included extended techniques and was written for solo or chamber settings. One piece that included extended techniques was Luciano Berio's Sequenza XII, which called for microtonal fingerings, glissandos, and timbral trills. Double and triple tonguing, flutter tonguing, multiphonics, quarter-tones, and singing are all utilized in Bruno Bartolozzi's Concertazioni. There were also a variety of concerti and bassoon and piano pieces written, such as John Williams's Five Sacred Trees and André Previn's Sonata for bassoon and piano or a Trio for violin, bassoon and piano by the Indonesian composer Ananda Sukarlan's A Curious Coincidence of a Tune Appearance in Austria & Scotland in the Night-Time. There were also "performance" pieces such as Peter Schickele's Sonata Abassoonata, which required the bassoonist to be both a musician and an actor. The bassoon quartet became prominent at this time, with pieces such as Daniel Dorff's It Takes Four to Tango.

=== Jazz ===
The bassoon is infrequently used as a jazz instrument and rarely seen in a jazz ensemble. It first began appearing in the 1920s, when Garvin Bushell began incorporating the bassoon in his performances. Specific calls for its use occurred in Paul Whiteman's group, the unusual octets of Alec Wilder, and a few other session appearances. The next few decades saw the instrument used only sporadically, as symphonic jazz fell out of favor, but the 1960s saw artists such as Yusef Lateef and Chick Corea incorporate bassoon into their recordings. Lateef's diverse and eclectic instrumentation saw the bassoon as a natural addition (see, e.g., The Centaur and the Phoenix (1960) which features bassoon as part of a 6-man horn section, including a few solos) while Corea employed the bassoon in combination with flautist Hubert Laws.

More recently, Illinois Jacquet, Ray Pizzi, Frank Tiberi, and Marshall Allen have both doubled on bassoon in addition to their saxophone performances. Bassoonist Karen Borca, a performer of free jazz, is one of the few jazz musicians to play only bassoon; Michael Rabinowitz, the Spanish bassoonist Javier Abad, and James Lassen, an American resident in Bergen, Norway, are others. Katherine Young plays the bassoon in the ensembles of Anthony Braxton. Lindsay Cooper, Paul Hanson, the Brazilian bassoonist Alexandre Silvério, Trent Jacobs and Daniel Smith are also currently using the bassoon in jazz. French bassoonists Jean-Jacques Decreux and Alexandre Ouzounoff have both recorded jazz, exploiting the flexibility of the Buffet system instrument to good effect.

=== Popular music ===
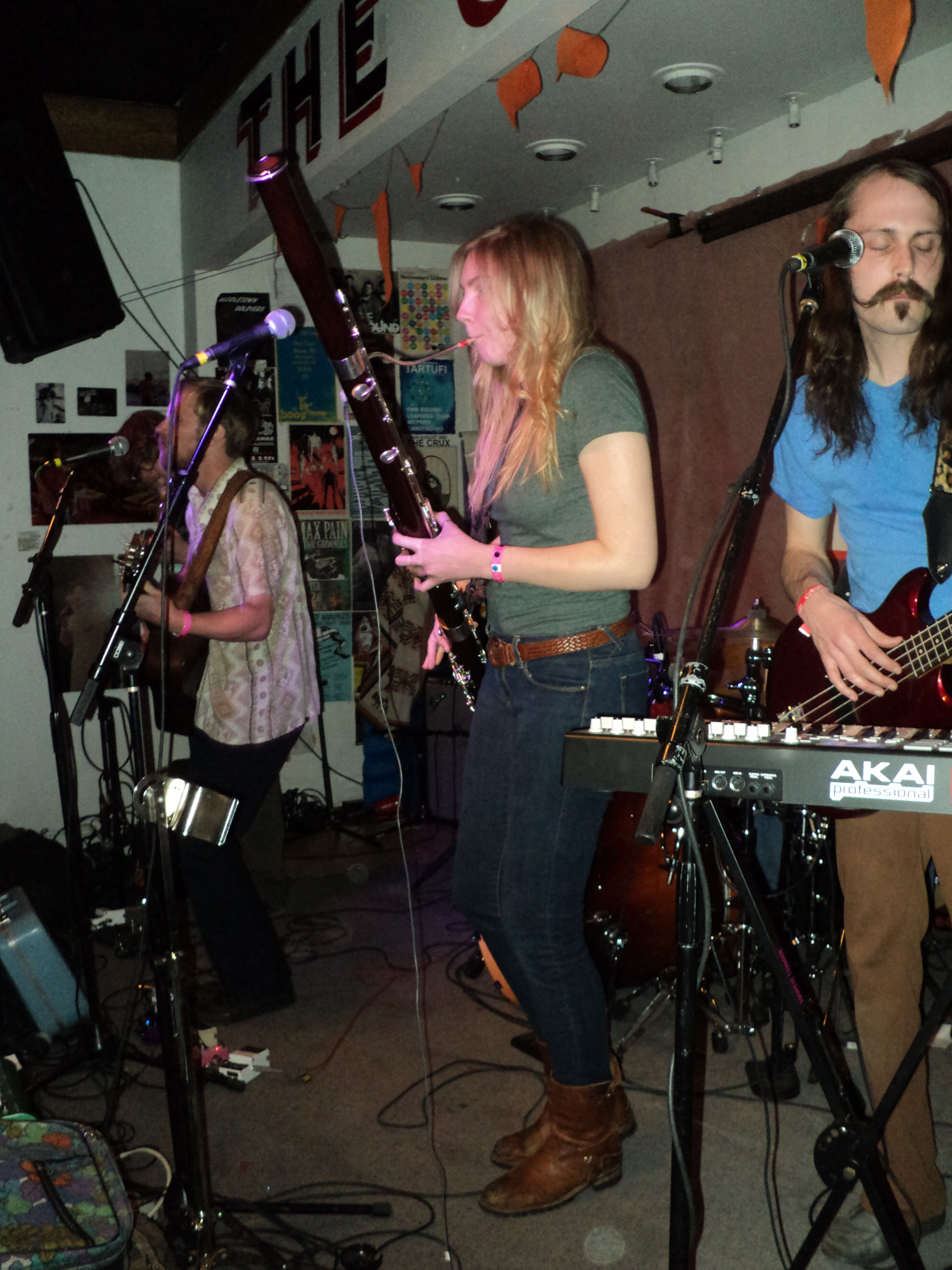
The contemporary quintet Edmund Wayne at the Treefort Music Fest

In conjunction with the use of electronic pickups and amplification, the instrument began to be used more somewhat in jazz and rock settings. However, the bassoon is still quite rare as a regular member of rock bands. Several 1960s pop music hits feature the bassoon, including "The Tears of a Clown" by Smokey Robinson and the Miracles (the bassoonist was Charles R. Sirard), "Jennifer Juniper" by Donovan, "59th Street Bridge Song" by Harpers Bizarre, and the oompah bassoon underlying The New Vaudeville Band's "Winchester Cathedral". From 1974 to 1978, the bassoon was played by Lindsay Cooper in the British avant-garde band Henry Cow. The Leonard Nimoy song "The Ballad of Bilbo Baggins" features the bassoon. In the 1970s it was played, in the British medieval/progressive rock band Gryphon, by Brian Gulland, as well as by the American band Ambrosia, where it was played by drummer Burleigh Drummond. The Belgian Rock in Opposition-band Univers Zero is also known for its use of the bassoon.

More recently, These New Puritans's 2010 album Hidden makes heavy use of the instrument throughout; their principal songwriter, Jack Barnett, claimed repeatedly to be "writing a lot of music for bassoon" in the run-up to its recording. The rock band Better Than Ezra took their name from a passage in Ernest Hemingway's A Moveable Feast in which the author comments that listening to an annoyingly talkative person is still "better than Ezra learning how to play the bassoon", referring to Ezra Pound.

British psychedelic/progressive rock band Knifeworld features the bassoon playing of Chloe Herrington, who also plays for experimental chamber rock orchestra Chrome Hoof.

Fiona Apple featured the bassoon in the opening track of her 2004 album Extraordinary Machine.

In 2016, the bassoon was featured on the album Gang Signs and Prayers by UK "grime" artist Stormzy. Played by UK bassoonist Louise Watson, the bassoon is heard in the tracks "Cold" and "Mr Skeng" as a complement to the electronic synthesizer bass lines typically found in this genre.

== Technique ==
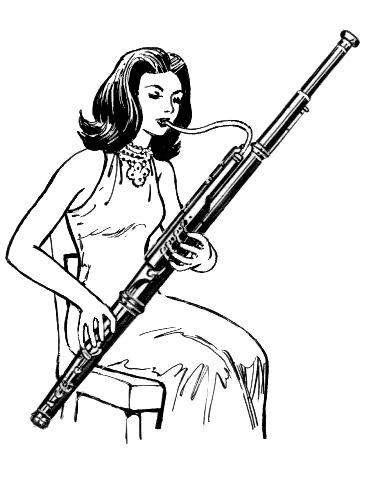

A collection of samples demonstrating the bassoon's range, abilities, and tone.
Playing Range (A_{1} B♭_{1} E_{5} A♭_{5})

Tone across octaves (B♭_{1} B♭_{2} B♭_{3} B♭_{4})

Chromatic scale (B♭_{1} to B♭_{4})

Articulations (staccato, legato, legato+vibrato, slurred)

Dynamics

Trills (B_{4} to C_{5}, B_{3} to C_{4}, B_{2} to C_{3})

Embouchure bending

Bassoon reed alone or crowing

Flutter tonguing

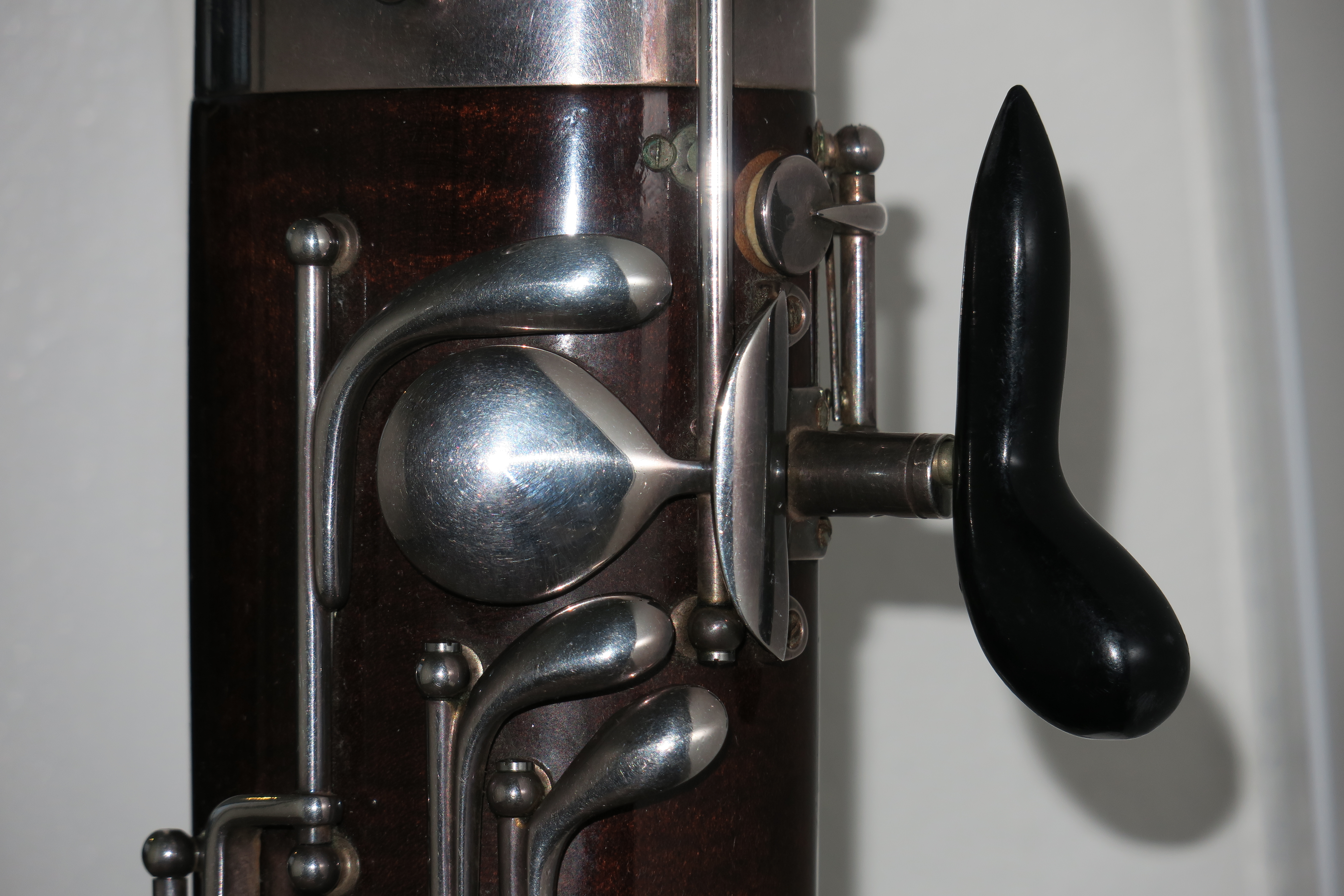
Close-up of a hand rest attached to a bassoon, viewed from behind. See also: viewed from the front.

The bassoon is held diagonally in front of the player, but unlike the flute, oboe and clarinet, it cannot be easily supported by the player's hands alone. Some means of additional support is usually required; the most common ones are a seat strap attached to the base of the boot joint, which is laid across the chair seat prior to sitting down, or a neck strap or shoulder harness attached to the top of the boot joint. Occasionally a spike similar to those used for the cello or the bass clarinet is attached to the bottom of the boot joint and rests on the floor. It is possible to play while standing up if the player uses a neck strap or similar harness, or if the seat strap is tied to the belt. Sometimes a device called a balance hanger is used when playing in a standing position. This is installed between the instrument and the neck strap, and shifts the point of support closer to the center of gravity, adjusting the distribution of weight between the two hands.

The bassoon is played with both hands in a stationary position, the left above the right, with five main finger holes on the front of the instrument (nearest the audience) plus a sixth that is activated by an open-standing key. Five additional keys on the front are controlled by the little fingers of each hand. The back of the instrument (nearest the player) has twelve or more keys to be controlled by the thumbs, the exact number varying depending on model.

To stabilize the right hand, many bassoonists use an adjustable comma-shaped apparatus called a "crutch", or a hand rest, which mounts to the boot joint. The crutch is secured with a thumb screw, which also allows the distance that it protrudes from the bassoon to be adjusted. Players rest the curve of the right hand where the thumb joins the palm against the crutch. The crutch also keeps the right hand from tiring and enables the player to keep the finger pads flat on the finger holes and keys.

An aspect of bassoon technique not found on any other woodwind is called flicking. It involves the left hand thumb momentarily pressing, or "flicking" the high A, C and D keys at the beginning of certain notes in the middle octave to achieve a clean slur from a lower note. This eliminates cracking, or brief multiphonics that happens without the use of this technique. Alternatively, a similar method is called "venting", which requires that the register key be used as part of the full fingering as opposed to being open momentarily at the start of the note. This is sometimes called the "European style"; venting raises the intonation of the notes slightly, and it can be advantageous when tuning to higher frequencies. Some bassoonists flick A and B♭ when tongued, for clarity of articulation, but flicking (or venting) is practically ubiquitous for slurs.

While flicking is used to slur up to higher notes, the whisper key is used for lower notes. From the A♭ right below middle C and lower, the whisper key is pressed with the left thumb and held for the duration of the note. This prevents cracking, as low notes can sometimes crack into a higher octave. Both flicking and using the whisper key is especially important to ensure notes speak properly during slurring between high and low registers.

While bassoons are usually critically tuned at the factory, the player nonetheless has a great degree of flexibility of pitch control through the use of breath support, embouchure, and reed profile. Players can also use alternate fingerings to adjust the pitch of many notes. Similar to other woodwind instruments, the length of the bassoon can be increased to lower pitch or decreased to raise pitch. On the bassoon, this is done preferably by changing the bocal to one of a different length, (lengths are denoted by a number on the bocal, usually starting at 0 for the shortest length, and 3 for the longest, but there are some manufacturers who will use other numbers) but it is possible to push the bocal in or out slightly to grossly adjust the pitch.

=== Embouchure and sound production ===
The bassoon embouchure is a very important aspect of producing a full, round, and rich sound on the instrument. The lips are both rolled over the teeth, often with the upper lip further along in an "overbite". The lips provide micromuscular pressure on the entire circumference of the reed, which grossly controls intonation and harmonic excitement, and thus must be constantly modulated with every change of note. How far along the reed the lips are placed affects both tone (with less reed in the mouth making the sound more edged or "reedy", and more reed making it smooth and less projectile) and the way the reed will respond to pressure.

The musculature employed in a bassoon embouchure is primarily around the lips, which pressure the reed into the shapes needed for the desired sound. The jaw is raised or lowered to adjust the oral cavity for better reed control, but the jaw muscles are used much less for upward vertical pressure than in single reeds, only being substantially employed in the very high register. However, double reed students often "bite" the reed with these muscles because the control and tone of the labial and other muscles is still developing, but this generally makes the sound sharp and "choked" as it contracts the aperture of the reed and stifles the vibration of its blades.

Apart from the embouchure proper, students must also develop substantial muscle tone and control in the diaphragm, throat, neck and upper chest, which are all employed to increase and direct air pressure. Air pressure is a very important aspect of the tone, intonation and projection of double reed instruments, affecting these qualities as much, or more than the embouchure does.

Attacking a note on the bassoon with imprecise amounts of muscle or air pressure for the desired pitch will result in poor intonation, cracking or multiphonics, accidentally producing the incorrect partial, or the reed not speaking at all. These problems are compounded by the individual qualities of reeds, which are categorically inconsistent in behaviour for inherent and exherent reasons.

The muscle requirements and variability of reeds mean it takes some time for bassoonists (and oboists) to develop an embouchure that exhibits consistent control across all reeds, dynamics and playing environments.

=== Modern fingering ===
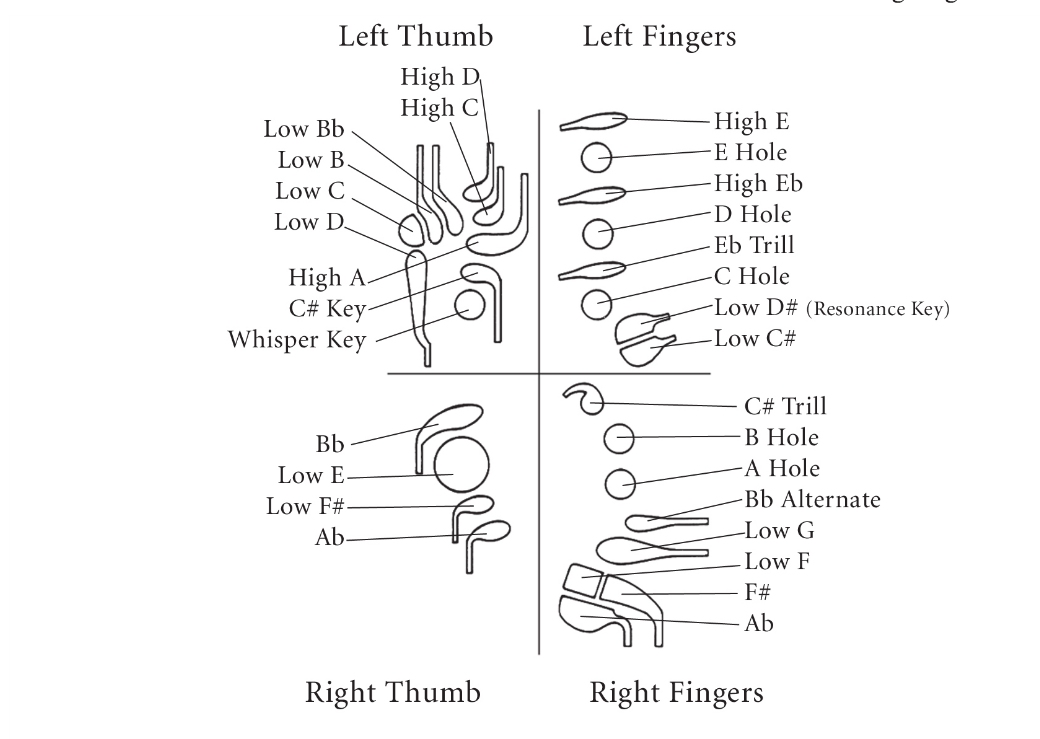
Diagram describing the keys on a bassoon

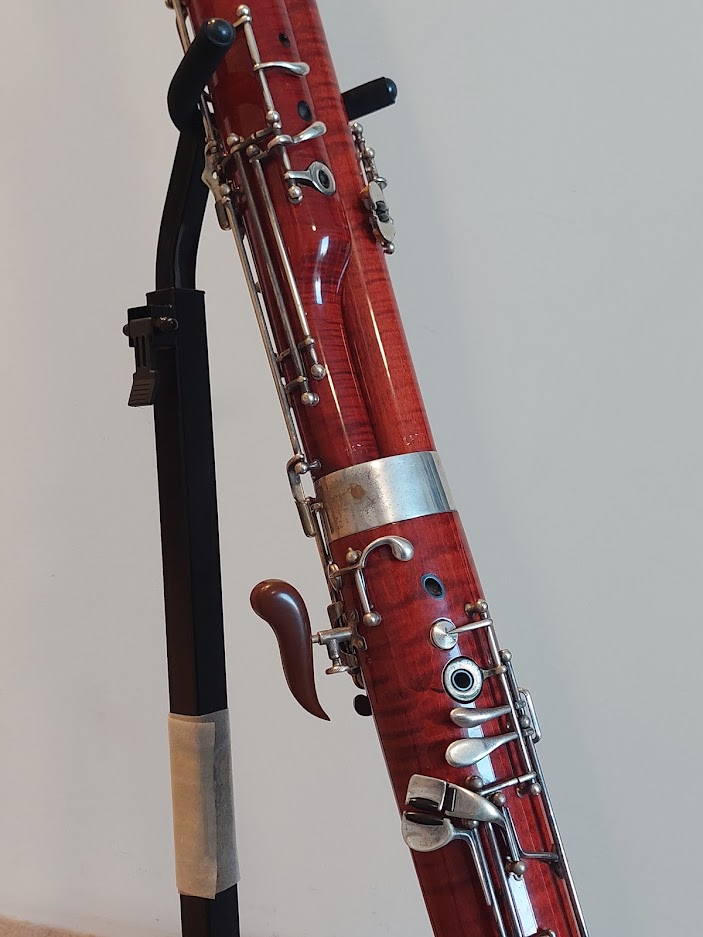
Holes and keys operated by fingers on left hand (above) and right hand (below)

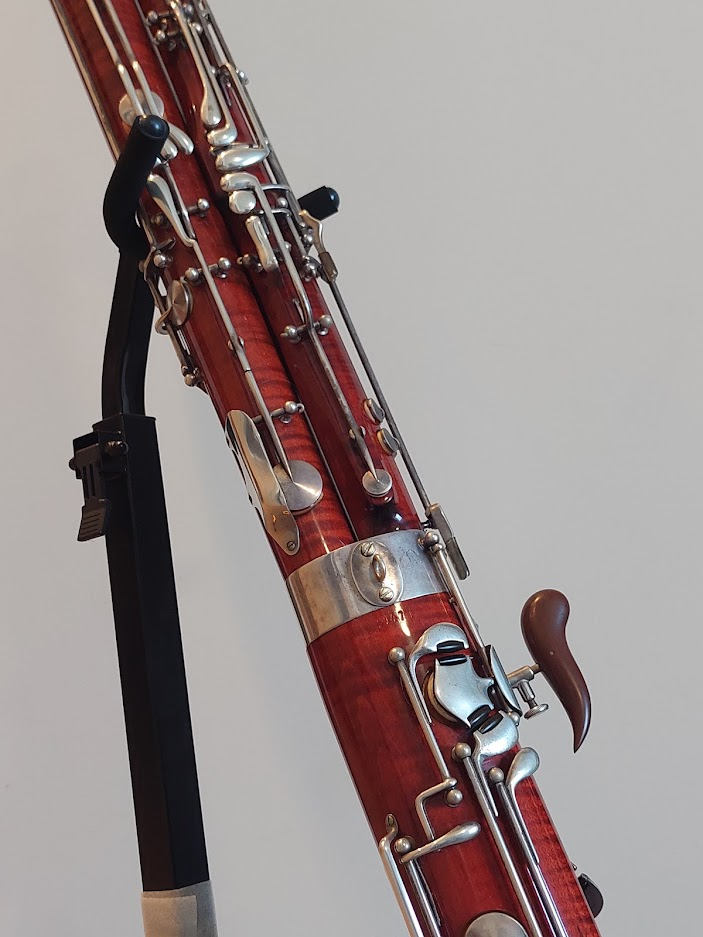
Keys operated by left thumb (above) and right thumb (below)

The fingering technique of the bassoon varies more between players, by a wide margin, than that of any other orchestral woodwind. The complex mechanism and acoustics mean the bassoon lacks simple fingerings of good sound quality or intonation for some notes (especially in the higher range), but, conversely, there is a great variety of superior, but generally more complicated, fingerings for them. Typically, the simpler fingerings for such notes are used as alternate or trill fingerings, and the bassoonist will use as "full fingering" one or several of the more complex executions possible, for optimal sound quality. The fingerings used are at the discretion of the bassoonist, and, for particular passages, he or she may experiment to find new alternate fingerings that are thus idiomatic to the player.

These elements have resulted in both "full" and alternate fingerings differing extensively between bassoonists, and are further informed by factors such as cultural difference in what sound is sought, how reeds are made, and regional variation in tuning frequencies (necessitating sharper or flatter fingerings). Regional enclaves of bassoonists tend to have some uniformity in technique, but on a global scale, technique differs such that two given bassoonists may share no fingerings for certain notes. Owing to these factors, ubiquitous bassoon technique can only be partially notated.

The left thumb operates nine keys: B♭_{1}, B_{1}, C_{2}, D_{2}, D_{5}, C_{5} (also B_{4}), two keys when combined create A_{4}, and the whisper key. The whisper key should be held down for notes between and including F_{2} and G♯_{3} and certain other notes; it can be omitted, but the pitch will destabilise. Additional notes can be created with the left thumb keys; the D_{2} and bottom key above the whisper key on the tenor joint (C♯ key) together create both C♯_{3} and C♯_{4}. The same bottom tenor-joint key is also used, with additional fingering, to create E_{5} and F_{5}. D_{5} and C_{5} together create C♯_{5}. When the two keys on the tenor joint to create A_{4} are used with slightly altered fingering on the boot joint, B♭_{4} is created. The whisper key may also be used at certain points throughout the instrument's high register, along with other fingerings, to alter sound quality as desired.

The right thumb operates four keys. The uppermost key is used to produce B♭_{2} and B♭_{3}, and may be used in B_{4}, F♯_{4}, C_{5}, D_{5}, F_{5}, and E♭_{5}. The large circular key, otherwise known as the "pancake key", is held down for all the lowest notes from E_{2} down to B♭_{1}. It is also used, like the whisper key, in additional fingerings for muting the sound. For example, in Ravel's "Boléro", the bassoon is asked to play the ostinato on G_{4}. This is easy to perform with the normal fingering for G_{4}, but Ravel directs that the player should also depress the E_{2} key (pancake key) to mute the sound (this being written with Buffet system in mind; the G fingering on which involves the Bb key – sometimes called "French" G on Heckel). The next key operated by the right thumb is known as the "spatula key": its primary use is to produce F♯_{2} and F♯_{3}. The lowermost key is used less often: it is used to produce A♭_{2} (G♯_{2}) and A♭_{3} (G♯_{3}), in a manner that avoids sliding the right fourth finger from another note.

The four fingers of the left hand can each be used in two different positions. The key normally operated by the index finger is primarily used for E_{5}, also serving for trills in the lower register. Its main assignment is the upper tone hole. This hole can be closed fully, or partially by rolling down the finger. This half-holing technique is used to overblow F♯_{3}, G_{3} and G♯_{3}. The middle finger typically stays on the centre hole on the tenor joint. It can also move to a lever used for E♭_{5}, also a trill key. The ring finger operates, on most models, one key. Some bassoons have an alternate E♭ key above the tone hole, predominantly for trills, but many do not. The smallest finger operates two side keys on the bass joint. The lower key is typically used for C♯_{2}, but can be used for muting or flattening notes in the tenor register. The upper key is used for E♭_{2}, E_{4}, F_{4}, F♯_{4}, A_{4}, B♭_{4}, B_{4}, C_{5}, C♯_{5}, and D_{5}; it flattens G_{3} and is the standard fingering for it in many places that tune to lower Hertz levels such as A440.

The four fingers of the right hand have at least one assignment each. The index finger stays over one hole, except that when E♭_{5} is played a side key at the top of the boot is used (this key also provides a C♯_{3} trill, albeit sharp on D). The middle finger remains stationary over the hole with a ring around it, and this ring and other pads are lifted when the smallest finger on the right hand pushes a lever. The ring finger typically remains stationary on the lower ring-finger key. However, the upper ring-finger key can be used, typically for B♭_{2} and B♭_{3}, in place of the top thumb key on the front of the boot joint; this key comes from the oboe, and some bassoons do not have it because the thumb fingering is practically universal. The smallest finger operates three keys. The backmost one, closest to the bassoonist, is held down throughout most of the bass register. F♯_{4} may be created with this key, as well as G_{4}, B♭_{4}, B_{4}, and C_{5} (the latter three employing solely it to flatten and stabilise the pitch). The lowest key for the smallest finger on the right hand is primarily used for A♭_{2} (G♯_{2}) and A♭_{3} (G♯_{3}) but can be used to improve D_{5}, E♭_{5}, and F_{5}. The frontmost key is used, in addition to the thumb key, to create G♭_{2} and G♭_{3}; on many bassoons this key operates a different tone hole to the thumb key and produces a slightly flatter F♯ ("duplicated F♯"); some techniques use one as standard for both octaves and the other for utility, but others use the thumb key for the lower and the fourth finger for the higher.

=== Extended techniques ===
Many extended techniques can be performed on the bassoon, such as multiphonics, flutter-tonguing, circular breathing, double tonguing, and harmonics. In the case of the bassoon, flutter-tonguing may be accomplished by "gargling" in the back of the throat as well as by the conventional method of rolling Rs. Multiphonics on the bassoon are plentiful, and can be achieved by using particular alternative fingerings, but are generally heavily influenced by embouchure position. Also, again using certain fingerings, notes may be produced on the instrument that sound lower pitches than the actual range of the instrument. These notes tend to sound very gravelly and out of tune, but technically sound below the low B♭.

The bassoonist may also produce lower notes than the bottom B♭ by extending the length of bell. This can be achieved by inserting a specially made "low A extension" into the bell, but may also be achieved with a small paper or rubber tube or a clarinet/cor anglais bell sitting inside the bassoon bell (although the note may tend sharp). The effect of this is to convert the lower B♭ into a lower note, almost always A natural; this broadly lowers the pitch of the instrument (most noticeably in the lower register) and will often accordingly convert the lowest B to B♭ (and render the neighbouring C very flat). The idea of using low A was begun by Richard Wagner, who wanted to extend the range of the bassoon. Many passages in his later operas require the low A as well as the B♭ immediately above it; this is possible on a normal bassoon using an extension which also flattens low B to B♭, but all extensions to the bell have significant effects on intonation and sound quality in the bottom register of the instrument, and passages such as this are more often realised with comparative ease by the contrabassoon.

Some bassoons have been specially made to allow bassoonists to realize similar passages. These bassoons are made with a "Wagner bell" which is an extended bell with a key for both the low A and the low B♭, but they are not widespread; bassoons with Wagner bells suffer similar intonational problems as a bassoon with an ordinary A extension, and a bassoon must be constructed specifically to accommodate one, making the extension option far less complicated. Extending the bassoon's range even lower than the A, though possible, would have even stronger effects on pitch and make the instrument effectively unusable.

Despite the logistic difficulties of the note, Wagner was not the only composer to write the low A. Another composer who has required the bassoon to be chromatic down to low A is Gustav Mahler. Richard Strauss also calls for the low A in his opera Intermezzo. Some works have optional low As, as in Carl Nielsen's Wind Quintet, op. 43, which includes an optional low A for the final cadence of the work.

=== Learning the bassoon ===
The complex fingering system and the expense and lack of access to quality bassoon reeds can make the bassoon more of a challenge to learn than some of the other woodwind instruments. Cost is another factor in a person's decision to pursue the bassoon. Prices may range from US$7,000 to over $45,000 for a high-quality instrument. In North America, schoolchildren may take up bassoon only after starting on another reed instrument, such as clarinet or saxophone.

Students in America often begin to pursue the study of bassoon performance and technique in the middle years of their music education, often in association with their school band program. Students are often provided with a school instrument and encouraged to pursue lessons with private instructors. Students typically receive instruction in proper posture, hand position, embouchure, repertoire, and tone production.

== See also ==
- List of bassoonists
- Bassoon makers
- Bassoon repertoire
- International Double Reed Society
- British Double Reed Society
