= 1823 in music =

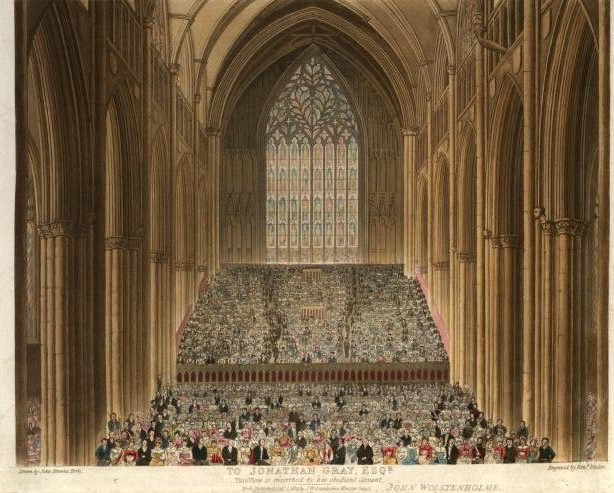
York Minster, during the 1823 York Musical Festival

This article is about music-related events in 1823.

== Events ==
- April 13 – According to his official biographer, Gustav Schilling, eleven-year-old Franz Liszt gives a concert after which he is personally congratulated by Ludwig van Beethoven; however, there is no record of Beethoven having attended the concert.
- May 8 - The most famous song of the nineteenth century, Home, Sweet Home, is sung for the first time in London. (melody by Englishman Sir Henry Bishop, lyrics by John Howard Payne.
- August 12 – Hector Berlioz writes to the journal Le Corsaire defending Gaspare Spontini's opera La vestale.
- Gioachino Rossini arrives in London and is presented to King George IV.
- The arpeggione is invented by Viennese guitar maker Johann Georg Staufer.
- Soprano Henriette Méric-Lalande catches the attention of the critic Castil-Blaze, who introduces her to the famous tenor Manuel García, thereby advancing her career.
- Franz Liszt is denied entry into the Paris Conservatory by the Director, Luigi Cherubini, who states that he cannot admit foreigners.

== Classical music ==
- Christian Frederik Barth – Oboe Concerto, Op.12
- Ludwig van Beethoven
  - Diabelli Variations, Op. 120
  - Missa Solemnis, Op. 123
- Vincenzo Bellini – Oboe Concerto in E-flat major
- Hector Berlioz – Amitié, reprends ton empire, H 10b
- Ferdinando Carulli – Duos Nocturnes, Op. 189
- Carl Czerny – Toccata, Op. 92
- Louis Ferdinand, Prince of Prussia – Rondo, Op. 13
- Mauro Giuliani – 6 Variations, Op. 112
- Mikhail Glinka – Andante Cantabile and Rondo
- Johann Nepomuk Hummel
  - Nocturne, theme et variations, Op. 99
  - Introduction, theme et variations, Op. 102
- Friedrich Wilhelm Kalkbrenner – Piano Concerto No. 1, Op. 61
- August Alexander Klengel – Piano Trio, Op. 36
- Ernst Krähmer – Variations brillantes, Op. 18
- Franz Krommer
  - Flute Quintet, Op. 101
  - Symphony No. 6 in D
- Friedrich Kuhlau
  - 3 Flute Quintets, Op. 51
  - 6 Sonatinas, Op. 55
- Giovanni Morandi – Raccolta di sonate per gli organi moderni No.4
- George Onslow
  - Piano Trio No. 7, Op. 20
  - Grand Sonata No. 2, Op. 22
  - String Quintets Nos.7-9, Opp. 23–25
- Ferdinand Ries
  - Symphony Nos. 4 and 5, Opp. 110 and 112
  - Introduction et rondeau sur une danse russe, Op. 113, No. 1
  - Piano Sonata, Op. 114
  - Cello Sonata No. 4 in G minor, Op. 125
- Christian Heinrich Rinck – 12 Adagios for Organ, Op. 57
- Bernhard Romberg – Cello Concerto No. 5, Op. 30
- Franz Schubert –
  - Die Schöne Müllerin
  - Drang in die Ferne, D. 770
  - Der Zwerg, D.771
  - Wehmut, D.772
  - Auf dem Wasser zu singen, D. 774
- Louis Spohr
  - Potpourri on Irish Themes, Op. 59
  - String Quartet No.18, Op. 61

== Stage works ==
- Gaetano Donizetti – Alfredo il grande
- Mary Fauche – The Shepherd King, Op.1
- Saverio Mercadante – Didone abbandonata
- Gioachino Rossini – Semiramide
- Franz Schubert
  - Fierrabras
  - Rosamunde
- Carl Maria von Weber – Euryanthe

== Popular Music ==
- "Home! Sweet Home!" w. John Howard Payne m. Henry Bishop

== Publications ==
- Alling Brown – The Gamut, or Scale of Music (New Haven: A. H. Maltby and Co.)
- Thomas Busby – A Musical Manual (London: Goulding & D'Almaine)
- Emanuel Aloys Förster – Anleitung zum General-Baß
- Philippe Marc Antoine Geslin – Exposition de la gamme (Paris)

== Births ==
- January 1 – Sándor Petőfi, lyricist (died 1849)
- January 3 – Jacques-Nicolas Lemmens, organist and composer (died 1881)
- January 5 – William Smith Rockstro, musicologist and musician (died 1895)
- January 21 – Alexandre Édouard Goria, pianist and composer (died 1860)
- January 27 – Édouard Lalo, composer (died 1892)
- June 2 – Carl Christian Møller, composer (died 1893)
- June 5 – Augusta Albertini, English soprano (died 1898)
- June 30 – Selmar Bagge, composer (died 1896)
- July 22 – Paulina Rivoli, operatic soprano (died 1881)
- August 3 – Francisco Ansenjo Barbieri, composer (died 1894)
- August 14 – Karel Miry, Belgian composer (died 1889)
- August 15 – Léon Gastinel, French composer (died 1906)
- August 16 – Adolphe Herman, composer (died 1903)
- August 17 – Theodor Julius Jaffé, opera singer and actor (died 1898)
- October 28 – William Spark, musician (died 1897)
- November 4 – Karel Komzák I, composer and conductor (died 1893)
- November 26 – Thomas Tellefsen, pianist and composer (died 1874)
- December 1 – Ernest Reyer, opera composer and music critic (died 1909)
- December 10 – Theodor Kirchner, composer and musician (died 1903)
- December 11 – David Bennett, Canadian soldier and musician (died 1902)
- date unknown – John Diamond, dancer and minstrel (died 1857)

== Deaths ==
- February 16 – Johann Gottfried Schicht, conductor and composer (born 1753)
- March 1 – Pierre-Jean Garat, singer (born 1764)
- March 18 – Jean-Baptiste Breval, French cellist and composer (born 1753)
- April – Jacques Widerkehr, Alsatian composer (born 1759)
- April 15 – Louis Deland, actor, singer and dancer (born 1772)
- June 20 – Theodor von Schacht, German composer (born 1748)
- October 2 – Daniel Steibelt, German pianist and composer (born 1765)
- November 12 – Emanuel Aloys Förster, composer and music teacher (born 1748)
- date unknown – Federigo Fiorillo, composer and musician (born 1755)
