= List of concertos for cor anglais =

A number of concertos and concertante works have been written for cor anglais (English horn) and string, wind, chamber, or full orchestra.

English horn concertos appeared about a century later than oboe solo pieces, mostly because until halfway through the 18th century different instruments (the taille de hautbois, vox humana and the oboe da caccia) had the role of the tenor or alto instrument in the oboe family. The modern English horn was developed from the oboe da caccia in the 1720s, probably in Silesia. The earliest known English horn concertos were written in the 1770s, mostly by prominent oboists of the day, such as Giuseppe Ferlendis, Ignaz Malzat (and his non-oboist brother Johann Michael Malzat) and Joseph Lacher. Few of these works have survived. Among the oldest extant English horn concertos are those by Josef Fiala (a period transcription of a piece originally for viola da gamba) and Anton Milling. It is known that Milling's concerti were performed in 1782 by the Italian oboist Giovanni Palestrini.

Many solos in orchestral works were written for the English horn and a decent amount of chamber music appeared for it as well. However, few solo works with a large ensemble were written for the instrument until well into the 20th century. Since then the repertoire has expanded considerably. Of the 270+ concertos listed below, only 35 predate the Second World War.

== Solo concertos ==
Composer	Title	Year (Note: Years in italics are estimates, which may be off by as much as 10 years.)	Accompaniment	Length (min.)	Publisher	Record label
Raffaele d'Alessandro	Serenade, op. 12	1936	strings and timpani	8'	Amadeus	Pan (Qualiton)
William Alwyn	Autumn Legend	1954	strings	12'	Lengnick	Lyrita; Chandos; Naxos
Keith Amos	Princess of the peacocks	1995	strings		CMA Publications	
Louis Applebaum	Five Snapshots	1999	strings			
Jesús Arámbarri	Ofrenda a Falla	1946	strings	4'	UME	Naxos
Henk Badings	American Folks Song Suite	1975	winds		Peters	
Carlos Baguer	Concerto (Note: This concerto may be lost (see ca:Corn anglès and ca:Carles Baguer (in Catalan))	1801	orchestra			
Matthias Bamert	Concertino	1966	strings		Schirmer; Schott	
Jeanne Barbillion	Cortège funèbre		strings			
Siegfried Barchet	Concertino	1973	strings			Hänssler Classic
Arnold Bax	Concertante for Three Solo Instruments and Orchestra	1949	orchestra	29'	Chapell	Chandos
Vincenzo Benatti	Concerto in F major	1790	orchestra	15'	Universal	
Ortwin Benninghoff	Legende	2001	strings			
Warren Benson	Recuerdo	1965	winds	16'	Presser	Golden Crest
Alexandre Béon	Air Lointain (Poème Symphonique)	1912	orchestra		Lemoine	
Hans Willy Bergen	Bucolica	1952	orchestra	3'	Bernbach; M.M. Cole and Peters	
Lorne Betts	Elegy	1949	strings		CNC	
Oliver Corcoran Binney	Three poems	1965	strings	8'		
Yohanan Boehm	Concerto, op. 19	1958	orchestra		IMP	
Jo van den Booren	Suite Dionysienne, op. 10	1964	strings	13'	Donemus	
Teresa Borràs i Fornell	Concerto, op. 116	1994	strings	20'	Tritó	
Siegfried Borris	Concertino	1949	strings		Peters	
Neil Bramson	Concertion	2006	strings		Da Capo	
Colin Brumby	Scena for cor anglais	1988	strings	9'	Phylloscopus	ABC Classics
Victor Bruns	Concerto, op. 61	1978	orchestra		Breitkopf	
Anthony Burgess	Concerto—OS6.3	1988	orchestra		Saga	
Eurico Carrapatoso	Cinco peças de carácter	2005	strings			
Elliott Carter	Pastoral (Note: Carter's own adaptation of his pastoral for English horn and piano. In 1937 Carter also wrote a Concerto for English horn and orchestra, but did not finish it and the manuscript has been destroyed.)	1988	strings marimba		Merion	
André Casanova	Musique concertante	1969	orchestra		United Music	
Romeo Cascarino	Blades of Grass	1945	strings&harp	7'	Lyra	Naxos
Frits Celis	Kareol, op. 61b	1997	orchestra	8'30		Phaedra
Sergio Cervetti	Duelle	1974	string bass	11'		
Emmanuel Chabrier	Lamento	1875	orchestra	8'	Schirmer	Naxos
Julius Chajes	Melody and dance	1958	strings		Transcontinental	Archer
Brian Cherney	In the stillness of September 1942	1992	orchestra		Doberman-Yppan	Centrediscs
Brian Cherney	La Princesse lointaine	2001	harp orchestra	18'	Doberman-Yppan	Centrediscs
Barney Childs	Concerto	1955	strings harp percussion	14'	ACE	
Elizabeth Clark	Larghetto	1941	orchestra			
Dinos Constantinides	Threnos of Creon	2006	strings		Magni	
Robert Cummings	Concerto	2006	orchestra			
Arthur Cunningham	Dim du mim	1969	orchestra		Presser	
Michael Daugherty	Spaghetti western	1998	orchestra	21'	Peer Music	Equilibrium
Gion Antoni Derungs	Elegia, op. 131/a	1993	harp strings		Pizzicato	
David Diamond	Elegy in memory of William Faulkner (No. 1 of Elegies for flute, EH, and string orch.)	1963	strings	9'	Peer Music	
Igor Dibak	Altayan Nocturne, op. 30	1984	strings percussion			
Caspar Diethelm	Concerto, op. 37	1963	harp strings			
Gerd Domhardt	Orpheus	1994	strings			
Gaetano Donizetti	Concertino in G major, In. 608	1816	orchestra	11'	Peters; Litolff	8+ recordings
Will Eisma	Indian summer	1981	orchestra		Donemus	
Roderick Elms	Il Cygnet	2003	orchestra	4'		Dutton
Eberhard Eyser	Girondelle	1995	strings		SMIC	
Giuseppe Ferlendis	Concerto in C (Note: This is an arrangement of one of Ferlendis' published oboe concertos, mistaken by Saint-Foix as a period arrangement of his lost English horn concerto.[version by Marcia Kraus , first version of 1987, final version of 2006))	1790	orchestra		KrausHaus	
George Fiala	Introduction et fugato	1961	strings			
Josef Fiala	Concerto in E♭	1780 (Note: This piece was originally a concerto for viola da gamba, which the composer played. There is a period arrangement for basset horn. The English horn version is a 20th-century idea.)	orchestra	12'	Cesky Hudebni Fond	Philips
Juraj Filas	Ora pro nobis, Fantaisie concertante	2000	orchestra		Bim Editions	
Ernst Fischer	First piece of “Drei Stücke” > Idylle	1948	orchestra	4'	Robert Forberg	
Anton Fladt	Concertino (Note: Composition date unknown; composer lived from 1775 to 1850.)	1810	orchestra		Befoco	
Bjørn Fongaard	Concerto, op. 120, No. 7	1976	orchestra	21'	NMIC	
Matt Fossa	Festive Dances	2006	strings timpany			
Tommy Fowler	Concerto	1995	orchestra			
Luca Francesconi	Plot in fiction	1986	orchestra	9'	Ricordi	Metier; Attaca(2x); Megadisc
Luca Francesconi	Secondo Concerto (Note: Soloist alternates between piccolo oboe (musette), oboe and English horn)	1991	orchestra	14'	Ricordi	BVHaast
Isadore Freed	Concertino	1953	orchestra		(Note: The orchestral score does not appear to survive, and may never have been produced. MS with piano: US-NYpl.)	
Peter Racine Fricker	Concertante No.1, op. 13	1950	strings	13'	Schott	
Eugenia Frothingham	Soliloquy	1974	orchestra			
Kenneth Fuchs	Eventide	2003	string orchestra, harp, percussion	21'	Edward B. Marks Music Company	Naxos
Peter Paul Fuchs	Fantasy	1974	strings	12'	Belwin & Mills	
Peter Paul Fuchs	Partita concertante, op. 43	1981	strings	10'		
Anis Fuleihan	Le cor anglais s'amuse	1969	orchestra			
Raphael Fusco	Capriccio Concertante	2007	orchestra			
Kenji Fusé	Elegy	1998	strings			
John Linton Gardner	The Last Prelude, op. 247	2003	strings		MS	
René Gerber	Concertino	1976	orchestra	22'		Gallo
Timothy Goplerud	Concerto	2001	orchestra			
Ursula Görsch	Konzertstück	1988	orchestra			
Gabriel Ian Gould	Watercolors	1998	orchestra	12'		Albany
Matthias Grimminger	Konzert	1995	orchestra		Artivo	
Richard Gross	Interlude	1952	strings		ACFE	
Urho Hallaste	Lyyrillinen sarja (Lyric Suite)	1962	strings	14'	FMIC	
Joseph Hallman	Divine Discontent	2007	strings harp percussion		Hallman	
Ted Hansen	Contrasts	1980	strings	25'	Seesaw	
A. Oscar Haugland	Concertino	1996	orchestra		TrevCo	
Nico Hermans	Ode	1985	strings		Donemus	
Jennifer Higdon	Soliloquy	1989	strings		Lawdon	
Edward Burlingame Hill	Music, op. 50	1943	orchestra	8'		
Sydney Phillip Hodkinson	The Edge of the Old One	1977	strings percussion	26'	Presser	New World
Bernard Hoffer	Concerto	1989	orchestra			
Anders Hultqvist	Variation n.31: concerto	1993	orchestra		SMIC	
Gordon Jacob	Rhapsody	1948	strings	9'	Steiner & Bell; Galaxy	Golden Crest
Stanislav Jelínek	Partita		strings			
Ivo Jirasek	Podvecerni hudba	1985	strings			
Joseph Jongen	Méditation op. 21	1901	orchestra			
Joseph Kaminski	Variations on an Israeli theme	1958	strings		Israeli Music Institute	
Maurice Karkoff	Lieder ohne Worte: Stimmungsbilder, op. 188	1991	orchestra		SMIC	
Elena Kats-Chernin	Champagne in a Teapot	1997	orchestra		Boosey & Hawks	
Ulysses Kay	Pietà	1950	strings	7'	Pembroke	
Garrison Keillor	What an English horn player thinks	2006	orchestra			
Aaron Jay Kernis	Colored Field	1994	orchestra	41'	Schirmer	Argo
Dirk-Michael Kirsch	Jahreszeiten, Op. 18	2005/07	orchestra	28’	ACCOLADE Musikverlag	
Uuno Klami	Intermezzo	1937	orchestra	4'	FMIC	Alba
Erland von Koch	Fantasi över en svensk vallåt	1975	strings		SMIC	
Erland von Koch	Rondo	1983	strings		WarnerCh	
Jan Koetsier	Vision pastorale, op. 15/1	1937	strings		Donemus	
Karl Michael Komma	Elegie und Scherzo	1998	orchestra	12’		
Leslie Kondorossy	Serenade, op. 11	1946	orchestra			
Marek Kopelent	Concertino	1984	orchestra	19’	Breitkopf und Härtel	Praga
Karl-Heinz Köper	Der Schwan von Pesaro	1979	orchestra	12'	Köper Verlag	
William Kraft	Concerto	2002	orchestra	19’	Presser	
Bernhard Krol	Serenata amorosa, op. 57	1972	mandolin orchestra		Trekel	
Bernhard Krol	Consolazione concerto, op. 70	1980	strings		Bote & Bock	
Herbert Küster	Bukolische serenade & Notturno		strings		Bosworth	
Oddvar S. Kvam	Elegy, op. 8	1959	strings timpany	7'	NMIC	
Otomar Kvěch	Cassandra and the Trojan Horse	2004	orchestra	10'	NMIC	
Harold Laudenslager	Elegy (In memoriam)	1959	strings timpany		US-Wc	
Aubert Lemeland	L'automne et ses envols d'étourneaux, op. 145	1990	harp strings	12'	Billaudot	Skarbo
Dimitrios Levidis	Divertissement, op. 25	1911	orchestra		Durdilly-Hayet	
Gerald Levinson	From Erebus and black night	1979	orchestra		Philharmusic	
Ivana Loudová	Luminous Voice	1985	orchestra		C F Peters	
Peter Machajdík	In Embrace	2019	strings	15'		
James MacMillan	The World's Ransoming	1996	orchestra	22'		LSO;Bis
Bruno Maderna	Concerto n.1 (Note: Soloist alternates between oboe, oboe d'amore, and English horn)	1962	orchestra	20'	Bruzzichelli	BVHaast; Col Legno
Bruno Maderna	Concerto n.3	1973	orchestra	17'	Ricordi	BVHaast; Col Legno
Johann Michael Malzat	Concerto in E♭	1785	orchestra			
Johann Michael Malzat	Concerto in F	1785	orchestra			
Fritz Mareczek	Sommerabend am Berg	1956	orchestra		Gerig; Peters	
John Marvin	Concerto	2006	orchestra		Fish Creek	
Nicholas Maw	Concerto	2005	orchestra	20'	Faber	
Hardy Mertens	Tone poem "Queen of Sheba", op. 125	1984	winds			
Anton Milling	Concerto in B♭	1780	strings		Molinari	
Walter Mourant	Elm St, Fairbury, Illinois	1954	strings	7'	ACA	
Alexandros Mouzas	Monologue	2001	orchestra	13'		Naxos
Bernhard Eduard Müller	Abendempfindung im Gebirge, op. 12	1880	orchestra		Merseburger	
Hans Müller-Talamona	Ballata	1989	orchestra			
Vazgen Muradian	Concerto, op. 80	1993	orchestra			
Gösta Nystroem	Ett litet intermezzo	1937	strings		SMIC	
Leroy Osmon	A Lonely Moment Wakens	2005	harp strings		RBC	
Ian Parrott	Concerto	1954	orchestra		Novello	
Gustaf Paulson	Concerto nr 1, op. 99	1958	strings timpany		SMIC	
Gustaf Paulson	Concerto nr 2, op. 103	1959	strings		SMIC	
Krzysztof Penderecki	Adagietto from the "Paradise Lost"	1979	strings	5'	MS	Dux
Alain Perron	Double éclat (Note: Soloist alternates between oboe d'amore, and English horn)	1992	orchestra	8'	Doberman	Vienna Modern Masters
Vincent Persichetti	Concerto, op. 137	1977	strings	24'	Elkan	Grenadilla; New World
Bryony Phillips	Child birth	1949	orchestra			
Astor Piazolla	Tanti anni prima (Molto cantabile) (Note: Originally part of the score for the movie "Henry IV".)	1984	orchestra	5'		8+ records
Giuseppe Pilotti	Konzertstück in F	1806	orchestra		Berliner	Torofon
Walter Piston	Fantasy	1952	harp strings	9'	AMP	Capriccio; Delos; Naxos
Juan Bautista Plaza	Elegía	1923	strings			
David L. Post	Concerto	1999	orchestra	19'		MMC (2x)
Archibald James Potter	Madra Líath na Mara (Grey Dog of the Sea)	1977	orchestra			
Mel Powell	Cantilena concertante	1948	orchestra		Schirmer	
Alexander Radvilovitch	Concerto	1986	orchestra			
Behzad Ranjbaran	Concerto for English Horn and Strings	2015	string orchestra	16'	Presser	
Anton Reicha	Scène (Recitative and Rondo)	1811	orchestra		McGinnis & Marx; Amadeus	Philips
Alan Ridout	Concertino	1979	strings		Emerson	Wirripang
Richard Rijnvos	Riflesso sull'acqua	2007	orchestra	15'		
Ned Rorem	Concerto	1992	orchestra	23'	Boosey & Hawkes	New World
Ronald Roseman	Concertion (or Chanson)	1983	strings	14'	ACE	
Arnold Rosner	Five meditations, op. 36	1967	harp strings	18'		Laurel
Arne Running	Concertino, op. 4	1982	strings	18'	Shawnee	CRI
Marjorie Rusche	Concerto	1974	orchestra			
Josef Rut	Concerto	1983	strings	15'		
Herman Sandby	Romance	1950	harp strings		Skandinavisk	
François Sarhan	Cinq pièces: "Études pour la Fleur inverse“	2004	orchestra	12'		
Josef Schelb	Concerto	1970	strings	19'		Antes
Harold Schiffman	Chamber Concerto	1986	orchestra	17'		North/South
Wolfgang-Andreas Schultz	Abendländisches Lied	1989	orchestra	18'	Astoria	
Peter Seabourne	Concerto	2013	orchestra	26'		
José Serebrier	Casi un Tango	2002	strings	6'		BIS
Larry Shackley	Concerto	2006	orchestra			
Rodney Sharman	Song without Words	2009	orchestra	20'		
Jean Sibelius	The Swan of Tuonela, op. 22/3	1893	orchestra	9'	Doblinger	125+ records
Stanisław Skrowaczewski	Concerto	1969	orchestra	18'	Schirmer	Desto; Phoenix
Vilnis Šmīdbergs	Concerto Symphony	1983	strings	18'	Musica Baltica	
Hale Smith	Recitative and Aria	1995	winds			
Robert Edward Smith	Concerto	2007	orchestra			
Vladimír Soukup	Sonata	1966	strings piano			
Simeon Stafford	Andante	2006	orchestra		Da Capo	
Jack Stamp	Elegy	1990	winds	6'		
Christopher Stanichar	Poem	2005	strings		Trevco	
Hans Steinmetz	Liebesruf eines Faun	1954	orchestra		Forberg; Trevco	
Allan Stephenson	Concerto	2000	strings	18'		K&K Verlagsanstalt
David Stock	Evensong	1985	winds	9'	Peters	
Wolfgang Stockmeier	Sonata	1969	strings		Möseler	
Jan Stoeckart	Suite Pastorale (Note: Using the pseudonym Julius Steffaro)	1975	harp strings	9'	Orlando	
Allan Burrage Stout	Intermezzo, op. 4	1955	strings celesta tom-tom		Peters	
Otto Strobl	Musik	1994	orchestra	10'		
Tomas Svoboda	Chorale from 15th Century, op. 52f	1993	strings	4'		
Keith Templeman	Concerto	2006	orchestra			
Johannes Paul Thilman	Orpheus	1969	orchestra		Peters	
John Thow	Bellini Sky	2005	orchestra	20'		
Roger Trefousse	Column	1979	strings	10'		
Paul Turok	Canzone Concertante, op. 57	1980	orchestra	13’	Schirmer	
Paul Turok	Concerto, op. 73	1985	strings	15’	Fischer	
Pēteris Vasks	Concerto	1989	orchestra	21’	Schott	Wergo; Conifer; RCA
Giulio Viozzi	Arioso e burlesca	1994	strings		Pizzicato	
Berthe di Vito-Delvaux	Piece Concertante, op. 105	1965	orchestra	9’		
Henk de Vlieger	Concerto (Note: Orchestration of Sonate in F minor by Carlo Yvon)	1992	orchestra	20’		
Lodewijk de Vocht	Herderswijze ("Shepherd's tune")	1908	strings			
Gustave Vogt	Adagio (Note: 2nd movement of otherwise lost Concerto. Charles David Lehrer, An Introduction to the 16 Oboe Concertos of Gustave Vogt)	1830	orchestra		F-Pn 16.683	
Gustave Vogt	Prière de Zingarelli, Lettre A	1835	orchestra		Richault	
Zbynek Vostrak	Kristaly (Crystals), op. 65	1983	strings percussion	13'		
Alarich Wallner	Konzert	1971	orchestra			
Fried Walter	Traunsee	1957	strings harp glockenspiel			
Guy Warrack	Lullaby	1950	orchestra	6'	Novello	
Derek Weagle	Resplendent Sorrow	2016	strings and harp	12'	Risanare Music	
John Weinzweig	Divertimento n.11	1990	strings	13'	CMC	CMC
Elliot Weisgarber	Autumnal Music	1973	strings	15'	CMC	
Joseph Pollard White	Concerto for Oboe d'amore	2006	orchestra			
Michel Wiblé	Nocturne	1946	harp orchestra			
Michel Wiblé	Ballade	1955	orchestra			
Michel Wiblé	Rapsodia	1962	strings percussion			
Peter Wiegold	Earth, receive an honoured guest	2003	strings	18'		
Alec Wilder	Air	1944	strings	4'	USA	Sony; Newport
Robert Wittinger	Consonante, op. 5	1965	orchestra			
Hugo Wolf	Italian serenade (Note: Wolf originally orchestrated his serenade for English horn and orchestra, but in the final version (finished by Max Reger in 1903), the solo English horn was replaced by a solo viola.)	1892	orchestra	8'		
Ermanno Wolf-Ferrari	Concertino in A♭, op. 34	1947	orchestra	27’	Leuckart; Peters	CPO; Koch; Tactus (2x)
Pavel Zemek	Serenade	2004	orchestra			
Richard Zettler	Concerto	1966	winds			

== Double and triple concertos ==
Composer	Title	Year	Other soloist(s)	Accompaniment	Length (min.)	Publisher	Record label
Kalevi Aho	Double Concerto	2014	harp	orchestra	30'	Fennica Gehrman	
Benjamin Ashkenazy	Izkor, in memoriam Glenn Gould, op. 9	1986	piano	orchestra		Donemus	
Robert George Barrow	Sinfonia concertante		trumpet, double bass	orchestra			
Stefano Bellon	Alfabeto deserto	2006	flute	orchestra			
Michael Berkeley	Tristessa	2004	viola	orchestra	22'	OUP	Chandos
John Biggs	Double Reed Concerto	2011	oboe, bassoon	strings			
Victor Bruns	Concerto, op. 74	1982	flute	strings, percussion		Breitkopf	
Diana Burrell	Dunkelhvide Månestråler	1996	contralto	orchestra		UMP	
Luigi Cherubini	Ave Maria: Offertorium	1816	soprano	orchestra	5'	Fentone; Kalmus	9+ recordings
Aaron Copland	Quiet City	1940	trumpet	strings	10'	Boosey & Hawks	46+ recordings
Lars Danielsson	Double Concerto	2018	double bass/cello	orchestra	40'		
Jan van Dijk	Suite pastorale, op. 199	1953	oboe	orchestra		Donemus	
Franco Donatoni	Holly	1990	oboe, oboe d'amore	orchestra		Ricordi	
Antal Dorati	Trittico	1985	oboe, oboe d'amore	orchestra		Decca	
Johannes Driessler	Concerto da camera I, op. 51	1962	flute, violin	strings		Boosey & Hawks	
Roderick Elms	Cygncopations - Reverie et Danse	2003	vibraphone	orchestra	7'		Dutton
Harold Farberman	Shapings	1983	percussion (2)	strings		Cortelu	
Josef Fiala	Concertante in B♭	1780	clarinet	orchestra	20'	Musica Rara	Arte Nova
Eugene Goossens	Concert piece op.65	1958	2 harps	orchestra		Mills	ABC; Chandos
Percy Grainger	Colleen Dhas (The Valley Lay Smiling)	1904	flute, guitar	strings	4'	Bardic	Cala; Chandos; Koch
Jozef Gresak	Concertino pastorale	1965	oboe, horn	orchestra			
Gary Hayes	Serenade	1984	trumpet	strings			
Harald Heilmann	Gulbenkian-Concerto	1974	trombone	orchestra		FGC	
Lee Hoiby	Prayer and Procession	2010	flute, clarinet	wind ensemble	24'		
Arthur Honegger	Concerto da camera, H 196	1948	flute	strings	17'	Salabert	12+ recordings
Alan Hovhaness	Anahid op.57	1944	flute, trumpet	strings, percussion	14'	Peters	Crystal
Charles Ives	The Rainbow (Note: At 1:53 minutes hardly a "concerto")	1914	flute	strings, piano	2'	Peer Music	EMI, Sony, Unicorn Kanchana
Milko Kelemen	Interplay	1998	oboe, oboe d'amore	orchestra		Sikorski	
Miklos Kocsar	Episodi	1982	oboe	strings	15'	Editio Musica	Hungaroton
Karl Heinz Köper	Concertino Tricolore	1974	bass clarinet, bassoon	strings	12'	Köper	
David I. Krivitsky	Double concerto	1989	piccolo trumpet	strings			
Riccardo Malipiero	Composizione concertata	1982	oboe, oboe d'amore	strings	14'	Suvini Zerboni	
Ignaz? Malzat	Arietta e rondo	1792	English horn	orchestra			
Ignaz? Malzat	Variazione e cantabile	1799	bassoon	orchestra			
Clark McAlister	Elegia para Quijote y Quijana	1996	double bass	winds	21'	Maecenas	Albany
Louis Moyse	Marlborian concerto No. 2	1969	flute	orchestra			
Knut Nystedt	Concertino, op. 29	1952	clarinet	strings	19'	NMIC	Norsk Komponist Forening
Alessio Prati	Misero pargoletto (aria)	1786	alto	orchestra			
André Previn	Reflections	1981	cello	orchestra	13'	Chester	Angel
Augusto B. Rattenbach	Doppio concerto	1969	clarinet	orchestra			
João Guilherme Ripper	Abertura Concertante	1999	oboe	orchestra			
Irving Robbin	Concerto for oboes and strings	1983	oboe, oboe d'amore	strings			
Alec Roth	Departure of the Queen of Sheba	1999	oboe	strings			
Helmut Sadler	Dialog-Szenen		oboe	strings	20'	Latzina	
Nicola Scardicchio	Kemit, canti e danze del giovane Horus	2002	soprano, viola	orchestra		Latzina	
Othmar Schoeck	Serenade, op. 27	1930	oboe	strings	5'	Breitkopf & Härtel	CPO
Max Schubel	Elation "Uniesienie"	2002	voice, cello	orchestra	8'		Opus One
Max Schubel	Aquirelle	2003	cello	orchestra	13'		Opus One
Rodion Shchedrin	Shepherd's Pipes of Vologda (Hommage to Bartók), op. 91	1995	oboe, horn	strings	8'	Schott	
Heinrich Simbriger	Elegie, op. 94	1963	violin	strings	12'		
Robert Starer	Concerto a quattro	1983	oboe, clarinet, bassoon	orchestra	22'	MCA	MMC
Clive Strutt	Suite in G minor after Loeillet	1996	oboe	strings, harpsichord	22'	SMC	
Gleb Taranov	Concerto piccolo	1937	flute, bassoon	strings			
Ivan Tcherepnin	Triple Concertino	1997	trombone, contrabass clarinet	winds	13'		
Francis Thorne	Triple Concerto	2004	bass clarinet, viola	orchestra	23'	Presser	
František Xaver Thuri	Triple Concerto in D-major	2005	oboe, oboe d'amore	strings, harpsichord			Thuri
Tôn-Thât Tiêt	Hy Vong 14	1971	harpsichord	strings	15'	Salabert	
Michael Touchi	Tango Barroco	2000	soprano saxophone	strings	16'		JDA
Eugenio Toussaint	Gauguin	2000	harp	strings	20'		Urtext
John Veale	Triune	1993	oboe	orchestra	14'	Lengnick	
Mathieu Vibert	Nocturne	1973	oboe	orchestra	15'		Doron
Graham Whettam	Les Roseaux Au Vent	1993	2 oboes, bassoon	strings	17'	Meriden	
Isang Yun	Duetto concertante	1987	oboe	strings	18'	Bote & Bock	

== Sources ==
- Caldini, Sandro (2008). "The English Horn Bibliography". International Double Reed Society.
- Clark, David Lindsey (1999). Appraisals of Original Wind Music. Greenwood Publ. pp. 148–152. ISBN 9780313309069.
- McMullen, William Wallace (1994). Soloistic English Horn Literature from 1736-1984. Pendragon Press. ISBN 9780918728784.

== See also ==
- Oboe concerto
- Oboe d'amore concerto
- Bass oboe concerto
