= 1753 in music =

== Events ==
- January 10 – King Louis XV of France banishes Eustachio Bambini and his Italian opera company from Paris.
- May 1 – George Frideric Handel plays the organ in public for the last time, at the Foundling Hospital, London.
- June 15 – Schlosstheater Schwetzingen in Schwetzingen Palace, Baden-Württemberg, designed by Nicolas de Pigage, is inaugurated with a performance of Ignaz Holzbauer's opera Il figlio delle selve.
- October 12 – Cuvilliés Theatre in the Munich Residenz, Bavaria, designed by François de Cuvilliés, is inaugurated with a performance of Ferrandini's opera Catone in Utica.
- November 21 – Niccolò Jommelli is appointed music director and Oberkapellmeister to Charles Eugene, Duke of Württemberg, at Stuttgart.
- Teatro Carignano in Turin is inaugurated with a performance of Baldassare Galuppi's opera Calamità de' cuori.
- Grand Théâtre in Antwerp is inaugurated.

== Classical music ==
- Carl Philipp Emanuel Bach
  - Harpsichord Concerto in C minor, H.441 Wq. 31
  - Harpsichord Concerto in B minor, H.440 Wq. 60
  - 6 Keyboard Sonatas, Wq.63 (published in the treatise of the same year)
- Christoph Graupner – Gott der Herr ist Sonne und Schild, GWV 1113/54 (autographed 1753, first performed 1754)
- Niccolò Jommelli – 7 Trio Sonatas (two of which are not currently attributed to Jommelli)
- Jean-Marie Leclair – [3] Ouvertures et [3] sonates en trio, Op. 13 (Paris). Ouverture No. 3 arranged from Ouverture to Scylla et Glaucus (1746); the trio sonatas are arranged from the solo sonatas Op. 2 No. 8, Op. 1 No. 12, and Op. 2 No. 12
- Domenico Scarlatti – Books 3 and 5, 30 sonatas each Collection of Harpsichord Sonatas
- Georg Philipp Telemann – Fürchtet den Herrn und dienet ihm treulich (oratorio)
- Carlo Tessarini – Contrasto armonico, Op. 10
- Giuseppe Valentini – Concerto in D major
- Samuel Simon Weise – Det Danske Syngende Nymphe-Chor (collection of songs)
- Johann Baptist Wendling – Flute Concerto in C major, GUN 26

== Opera ==
- Maria Agnesi – Ciro in Armenia
- Rinaldo Da Capua – La zingara
- Antoine Dauvergne – Les troqueurs
- Giovanni Battista Ferrandini – Catone in Utica
- Carl Heinrich Graun – Silla, GraunWV B:I:27
- Johann Adolf Hasse
  - L'eroe cinese
  - Solimano
- Niccolò Jommelli
  - Attilio Regolo, with libretto by Metastasio (composed 1752, first performed)
  - Bajazette
  - La clemenza di Tito
  - Il parataio (intermezzo)
- Jean-Joseph Cassanéa de Mondonville – Titon et l'Aurore
- Davide Perez – L'Olimpiade
- Jean-Philippe Rameau – Daphnis et Eglé

== Methods and theory writings ==
- Charles Avison – An Essay on Musical Expression
- Carl Philipp Emmanuel Bach publishes the first part of his treatise Versuch über die wahre Art das Clavier zu spielen ("An Essay on the True Art of Playing Keyboard Instruments"), including instructions for improvisation.
- Michel Corrette – Le Maitre de clavecin
- William Hayes – Remarks on Mr. Avison's Essay on Musical Expression
- Friedrich Wilhelm Marpurg – Abhandlung von der Fuge
- Jean-Philippe Rameau – Extrait d'une réponse de M. Rameau à M. Euler sur l'identité des octaves
- Friedrich Wilhelm Riedt – Versuch über die Musikalische Intervallen

== Births ==
- January 9 – Luísa Todi, Portuguese opera singer (died 1833)
- March 2 – Johann Samuel Schröter, German composer (died 1788)
- April 8 – Pigault-Lebrun, librettist and writer (died 1835)
- May 3 – Jeanne-Renée de Bombelles Travanet, composer and librettist (died 1828)
- June 8 – Nicolas Dalayrac, composer of opéra-comique (died 1809)
- September 29 – Johann Gottfried Schicht, conductor and composer (died 1823)
- November 4 – Wilhelm Gottlieb Becker, librettist and art historian (died 1813)
- November 6 – Jean-Baptiste Bréval, cellist and composer (died 1823)
- November 19 – Stanislas Champein, French composer (died 1830)
- November 30 – Johann Baptist Schenk, composer (died 1836)
- December 28 – Johan Wikmanson, organist and composer (died 1800)

== Deaths ==
- February 7 – Giovanni Alberto Ristori, opera composer and conductor, 60
- February 16 – Giacomo Facco, violinist, conductor and composer, 77
- May 19 – Jacques Aubert, composer, 63
- August 4 – Gottfried Silbermann, German constructor of keyboard instruments, 70
- September 24 – Georg Gebel (the younger), composer, 43
- November – Giuseppe Valentini, violinist, painter, poet, and composer, 71
- November 4 – Johann Nicolaus Bach, organist and composer, eldest son of Johann Christoph Bach, 84
- November 16 – Nicolas Racot de Grandval, harpsichordist and composer, 77
- unknown date – John Holt, bell-ringer and composer, 27
