= Oboe concerto =

Musical work for solo oboe and ensemble

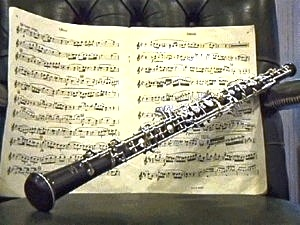

A number of concertos (as well as non-concerto works) have been written for the oboe, both as a solo instrument as well as in conjunction with other solo instrument(s), and accompanied by string orchestra, chamber orchestra, full orchestra, concert band, or similar large ensemble.

These include concertos by the following composers:

== Baroque ==
- Tomaso Albinoni
- Johann Sebastian Bach (reconstruction from harpsichord concerto)
- Johann Friedrich Fasch
- Christoph Förster
- Carl Heinrich Graun
- Christoph Graupner
- George Frideric Handel
- Johann Adolph Hasse
- Alessandro Marcello
- Johann Joachim Quantz
- Alessandro Scarlatti
- Giovanni Battista Sammartini
- Giuseppe Sammartini
- Georg Philipp Telemann
- Antonio Vivaldi

Tomaso Albinoni's Concerto for Two Oboes in F Major, Op. 9, No. 3. Performed by the Advent Chamber Orchestra with oboists Humbert Lucarelli and Edino Biaggi
1. Allegro

2. Adagio

3. Allegro

Vivaldi's Concerto for Oboe and Orchestra in C major (RV 447) - 2. Andante
The 2nd movement of Antonio Vivaldi's Oboe Concerto in C major, RV 447, Performed by the Advent Chamber Orchestra with oboist Edino Biaggi

== Classical ==
- Carl Philipp Emanuel Bach
- Johann Christian Bach
- Ludwig van Beethoven (lost)
- Carlo Besozzi
- Domenico Cimarosa
- Carl Ditters von Dittersdorf
- Josef Fiala
- Joseph Haydn (doubtful)
- William Herschel
- Franz Anton Hoffmeister
- Ignaz Holzbauer
- Jan Antonín Koželuh
- Franz Krommer
- Ludwig August Lebrun
- Wolfgang Amadeus Mozart (concerto)
- Antonio Rosetti
- Antonio Salieri
- Carl Stamitz
- Johann Stamitz
- Peter von Winter

== Romantic ==
Antonio Pasculli - Gran Concerto
Antonio Pasculli's Gran Concerto. Performed by Alex Klein, oboe, and Lisa Bergman, piano

- Vincenzo Bellini (concerto)
- Gaetano Donizetti
- Jan Kalivoda
- Bernhard Molique
- Antonio Pasculli
- Richard Strauss (concerto)
- Ralph Vaughan Williams (concerto)
- Carl Maria von Weber (spurious)

== Modern/Contemporary ==
- Kalevi Aho
- William Alwyn
- Khanyafi Chinakaev
- Hendrik Andriessen
- Malcolm Arnold
- Walter Aschaffenburg
- Tadeusz Baird
- Sally Beamish
- David Bedford
- Arthur Benjamin (on themes of Domenico Cimarosa)
- Lennox Berkeley
- Michael Berkeley
- John Biggs
- Judith Bingham
- Anthony Burgess
- Edwin Carr
- Elliott Carter
- Mario Castelnuovo-Tedesco
- John Corigliano
- Peter Maxwell Davies
- Edison Denisov
- Bill Douglas
- Joël-François Durand
- Ross Edwards
- Lukas Foss
- Matthew Fossa
- Jean Françaix
- John Gardner
- Jeremy Gill
- Eugene Goossens
- Michael Zev Gordon
- Helen Grime
- John Harbison
- Christos Hatzis
- Frigyes Hidas
- Jennifer Higdon
- Vagn Holmboe
- Alan Hovhaness
- Jacques Ibert
- Gordon Jacob
- John Joubert
- Jouni Kaipainen
- Graeme Koehne
- Thomas Oboe Lee
- Kenneth Leighton
- Malcolm Lipkin
- Bent Lorentzen
- Salvatore Macchia
- James MacMillan
- Bruno Maderna
- Ursula Mamlok
- Bohuslav Martinů
- Peter Mieg
- Darius Milhaud
- Anthony Milner
- Paul Moravec
- Dominic Muldowney
- David Mullikin
- Thea Musgrave
- Arne Nordheim
- Sean Osborn
- Haim Permont
- Osmo Tapio Räihälä
- Bernard Rands
- Alan Rawsthorne
- Malcolm D Robertson
- George Rochberg
- Christopher Rouse
- Edwin Roxburgh
- Andrey Rubtsov
- Poul Ruders
- Harald Sæverud
- Peter Schickele
- Rodion Shchedrin
- Roger Steptoe
- Hilary Tann
- Ralph Vaughan Williams
- Carl Vine
- Gwyneth Walker
- Grace Williams
- John Williams
- Ermanno Wolf-Ferrari
- John Woolrich
- Marco Aurelio Yano
- Isang Yun
- Eugene Zador
- Bernd Alois Zimmermann
- Ellen Taaffe Zwilich

== See also ==
- Concerto
- Bass oboe concerto
- English horn concerto
- Bassoon concerto
