= Charles Triébert =

French oboist and instrument maker

Charles Louis Triébert (31 October 1810 – 18 July 1867) was a French oboist and instrument-maker.

== Life ==
Triébert was born in Paris in 1810; his father Guillaume Triébert (1770–1847) and brother Frédéric Triébert (1813–1878) were woodwind instrument makers.

He studied at the Conservatoire de Paris, and took the first oboe prize in Gustave Vogt's class in 1829. He was known to have an excellent tone, great execution, and good style; he was a noted player at the Théâtre des Italiens, and in the Orchestre de la Société des Concerts du Conservatoire.

Although much occupied with instrument-making, he carried on his oboe-playing with earnestness, and composed much for the instrument: original pieces, arrangements of operatic airs, and (with Eugène Louis-Marie Jancourt) fantaisies-concertantes for oboe and bassoon. At the Paris Exhibition of 1855 Triébert obtained a medal for his adaptation of the Boehm system to the oboe, and for improved bassoons. Triébert succeeded Stanislas Verroust as professor of the oboe at the Conservatoire in April 1863, and retained the post until his death in 1867.
