= Maria Agnesi =

Maria Agnesi may refer to:

- Maria Gaetana Agnesi (1718–1799), Italian mathematician, philosopher, theologian and humanitarian
- Maria Teresa Agnesi (1720–1795), Italian composer
