= Oboe Concerto (Bellini) =

1823 composition by Vincenzo Bellini

- by Vincenzo Bellini
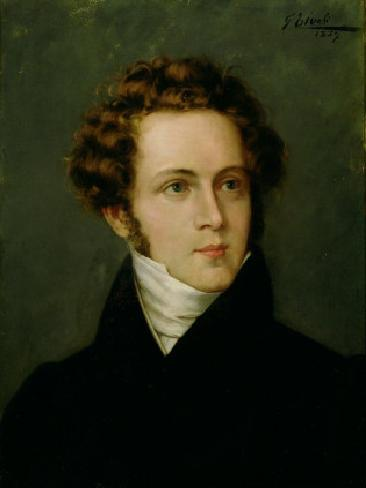
- Portrait of Bellini from an unknown date
- Key: E♭ major
- Period: Romantic music
- Composed: 1823
- Scoring: Oboe; orchestra

The Oboe Concerto in E♭ major is an oboe concerto by Vincenzo Bellini, most likely composed in 1823. Bellini's only surviving concerto, the piece is also an important part of his limited instrumental output. Performances typically last between seven and eight minutes.

== Background ==
In 1819, at the age of eighteen, Bellini received a scholarship to the Conservatorio di San Sebastiano in Naples. He composed the Oboe Concerto during his studies. Gramophone called the piece "a product of his youth". Some other works composed by Bellini during the period included sacred music and fifteen symphonies (six of which are lost). In addition, fragments exist for two other concertos for woodwind instruments composed around the time: a bassoon concerto in G major that remains incomplete and a draft for a flute concerto in A major.

== Structure and analysis ==
The work is scored for solo oboe and an orchestra consisting of two flutes, two oboes, two clarinets, two bassoons, two French horns, and strings. It is in one movement with three distinct sections:

1. Risoluto allegro
2. Larghetto cantabile
3. Allegro polonese

The piece is a concerto "all'italiana", a relatively new form in Bellini's time, which consists of an introduction, a slow section, and an Allegro. The first section, marked Risoluto allegro, is only nine bars long and in the key of G major. It does not develop any melodic material in the rest of the piece, and it consists of a chord progression that makes heavy use of chromatic intervals. Naxos Records referred to it as "the shortest of dramatic introductions". Charles-David Lehrer opined that the concerto "deleted the first movement structure", in contrast to previous concerti for the oboe. Lehrer also stated that most pieces without an extensive first movement were labeled as concertinos.

The second section, Larghetto cantabile, marks the first entrance of the oboe and transitions to E♭ major, a major third down from the previous key of G major. In this section, the oboe soloist has several short cadenzas, expressive melodies, and fermata notes. The section can be divided into three subsections. Hyperion Records called the oboe part in the section "aria-like", stating that it was typical of the bel canto style that was to influence Frédéric Chopin.

The third and final section, a polonaise marked Allegro, is the largest section of the piece and changes the time signature to 3/4. The section shows a greater amount of interaction between the solo and orchestral parts, as there is frequent imitation and trading off of the main theme. One compiler and publisher of Bellini's music called the section a rondo in the structure "ABACABX"; he also wrote that "the orchestra connects the different episodes by short riffs […] and replies once the main theme." Lehrer noted this third section as part of the common trend towards polonaises in rondo format as final movements of Romantic oboe concerti, listing it with works by Carl Maria von Weber, Stanislas Verroust, and Georges Guilhaud.

== Reception ==
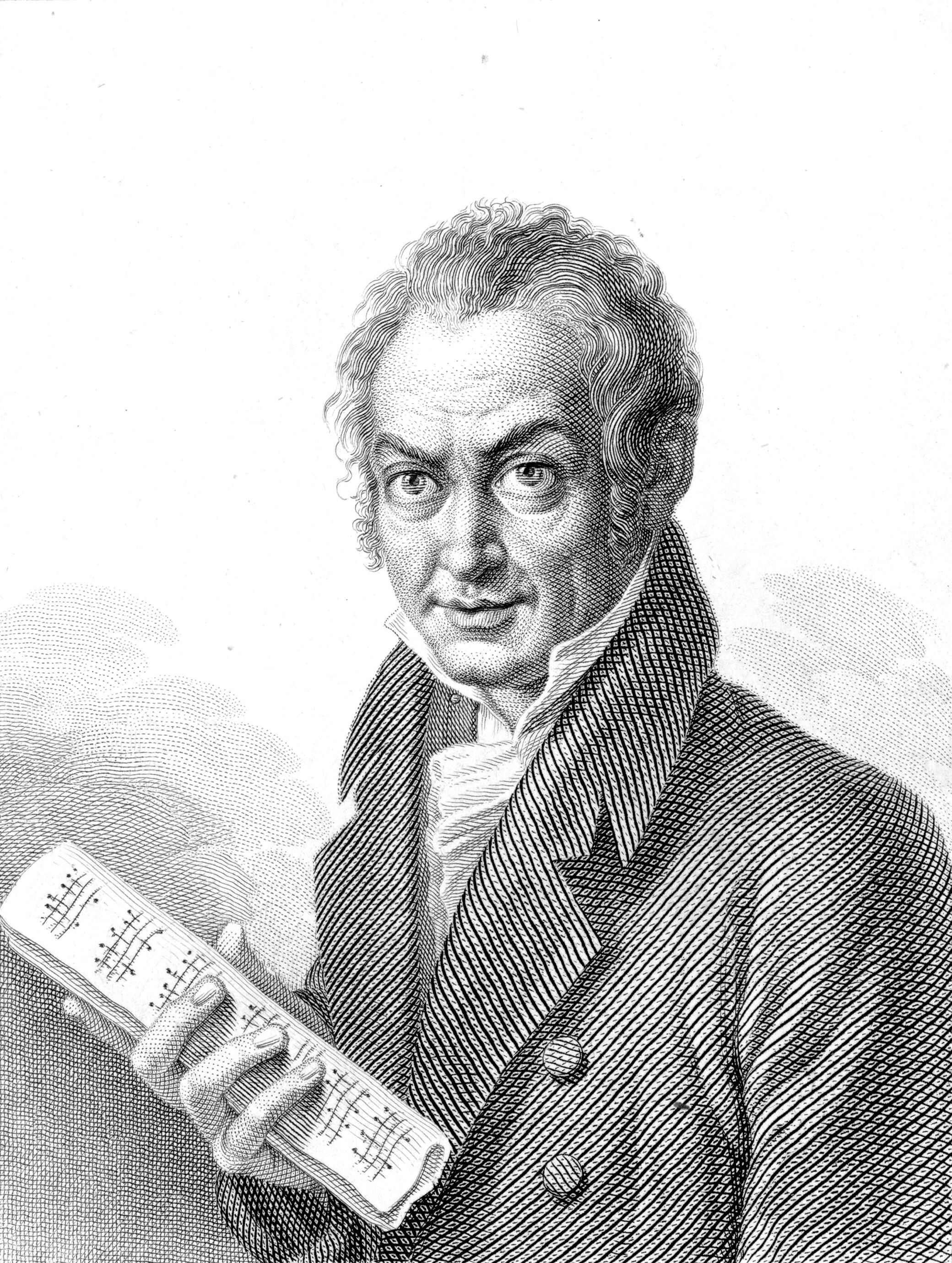
Bellini's teacher, Niccolò Antonio Zingarelli.

The concerto has often been noted for its operatic qualities and the usage of bel canto themes in the solo oboe part. Valeria Lucentini, in an introduction to an edition of the piece, wrote, "Bellini devolves the lively and intense expressiveness of vocal music to the cantabile. As a result, Bellini places particular emphasis on the solo instrument, in effect giving it the same attention as the human voice." She also stated that this characteristic was possibly influenced by some of the wordless songs composed by Bellini's teacher, Niccolò Antonio Zingarelli.

Program notes for a United States Military Academy concert wrote that "The lyrical writing in the concerto is so indicative of Bellini's style that one could easily believe it to belong to one of Bellini's operas, and yet the work is still thoroughly idiomatic to the oboe." Hyperion Records opined that "Bellini's juxtaposition of lyrical and more rigorous passages gives the little work an expertly managed inner balance." Gramophone referred to the concerto as one that "extends the past rather than smooths the passage to the twentieth-century revival of the form," contrasting it with Domenico Cimarosa's constructed oboe concerto by Arthur Benjamin as an example of a 20th-century 'revival' of a work that was not originally made.
