= English Horn Concerto (Rorem) =

The Concerto for English Horn and Orchestra is a composition for solo English horn and orchestra by the American composer Ned Rorem. The work was commissioned by the New York Philharmonic to commemorate the orchestra's sesquicentennial anniversary. It was first performed by the soloist Thomas Stacy and the New York Philharmonic under the direction of Kurt Masur at Avery Fisher Hall on January 27, 1994. Rorem dedicated the piece to Thomas Stacy. The work is one of the few prominent contemporary English horn concertos, along with James MacMillan's The World's Ransoming.

== Composition ==
=== Background ===
The concerto was written over the winter of 1991–1992, predominantly while Rorem was in the hospital. Rorem described the composition process as "one of physical stress," adding, "when I worked at all it was through a hazy protestant need to meet deadlines." The composer thus originally intended to call the piece Meditations in an Emergency after the eponymous poem by Frank O'Hara. Rorem opted for a straightforward title, however, noting his lack of belief that "music, especially non-vocal music, necessarily reflects its maker's mood in medias res, or what people can agree—as they can with poetry and pictures—that a specific piece is angry or happy or noble, much less that it represents an ocean or an operating room." He added, "When a gloomy composer labors on a lengthy project he checks the gloom at his studio door, along with his aches and pains, and functions in a kind of limbo. (A definition of the Artist: One who exists outside himself, and has something to show for it. He is the least egotistical of citizens)."

Given his lack of mobility, this was the first piece that Rorem composed directly onto paper without any keyboard instrument. The work was started on December 6, 1991, and completed on June 13, 1992. In the score program notes, he wrote:

My sole aim in writing the concerto for English Horn was to exploit that instrument's special luster and pliability. The literature is slim, maybe because the English Horn—or, as the English say, the cor anglais—cannot hold its own against an orchestra as singularly as a piano or trumpet or cello or flute. To make the sound gleam like an opaline reed through a wash of brass and silver, catgut steel, I used an orchestra by Philharmonic standards is hardly huge, with a pair of oboes like nephews often flanking, sometimes goading, their wistful relative.

=== Structure ===
The work has a duration of approximately 23 minutes and is cast in five movements:

1. Preamble and Amble
2. Love Letter
3. Recurring Dream
4. Perpetual Motion
5. Medley and Prayer

=== Instrumentation ===
The work is scored for solo English horn and an orchestra comprising two flutes (2nd doubling piccolo), two oboes, two clarinets, two bassoons, two horns, two trumpets, timpani, four percussionists, harp, piano (doubling celesta), and strings.

== Reception ==
Reviewing the world premiere, Alex Ross of The New York Times wrote, "The concerto is simply a sequence of five sketches, with melody interspersed; the orchestral fabric is subtle enough for the mild-mannered English horn to assume a convincing solo role. Nothing goes on too long, and some movements seem too short." He added:

The introduction, coda and third movement ("Recurring Dream") have the most appealing music, wistful and songful. "Love Letter," the intriguingly enigmatic second movement, drifts toward restrained anguish, and then sudden silence. The first, fourth and fifth movements are rapid and assertive, churningly complex at times, but on Thursday night they seemed curiously fragmentary and unfocused. Mr. Stacy tied these disparate impressions together with a rich tone and dazzling technique.

== See also ==
- List of concertos for English horn
