= Teatro Regio Ducale =

Coordinates: 45.4632°N 9.19114°E

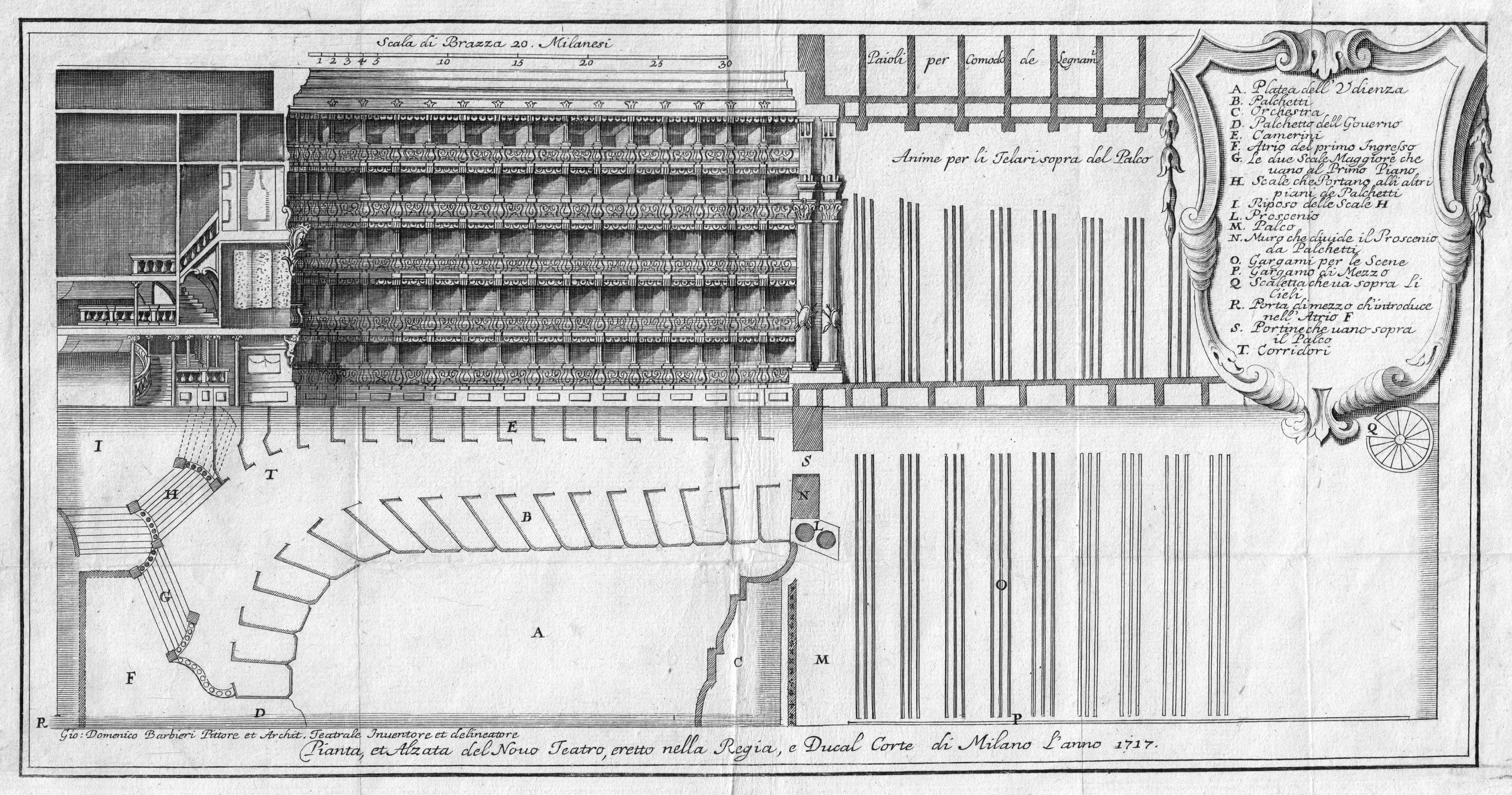
Cutaway drawing of the theatre (Descrizione di Milano, 1737)

The Teatro Regio Ducale (Italian for "Royal Ducal Theatre"; also Regio Ducal Teatro) was the opera house in Milan from 26 December 1717 until 25 February 1776, when part of it was burned down following a carnival gala. Many famous composers and their operas are associated with it, including the premieres of Mozart's Mitridate, re di Ponto, Ascanio in Alba, and Lucio Silla. The opera house also saw the premiere of Maria Teresa Agnesi Pinottini's Ciro in Armenia in 1753; one of the earliest successfully received operas by a female composer.

The atmosphere in opera houses at the time was very sociable and congenial, and the Teatro Regio Ducale was no exception. The English traveller and music writer Charles Burney describes its faro tables for gambling, and gives this description:

The theatre here is very large and splendid; it has five rows of boxes on each side, one hundred in each row; and parallel to these runs a broad gallery ... as an avenue to every row of boxes: each box will contain six persons, who sit at the sides, facing each other. Across the gallery of communications is a complete room to every box, with a fireplace in it, and all conveniences for refreshments and cards. In the fourth row is a pharo table, on each side of the house, which is used during the performance of the opera.

After the destruction of the Teatro Regio Ducale, which had been a wing of the Royal Palace, two new theatres were commissioned to be built near the site, both designed by Giuseppe Piermarini. The Nuovo Regio Ducal Teatro alla Scala (with variant forms of its name), the present-day La Scala, was inaugurated on 3 August 1778. The Teatro alla Canobbiana, now called the Teatro Lirico, was inaugurated on 21 August 1779.
