= Flute Concerto No. 1 (Mozart) =

1778 composition by W. A. Mozart

Flute Concerto in G major
- No. 1
- by W. A. Mozart
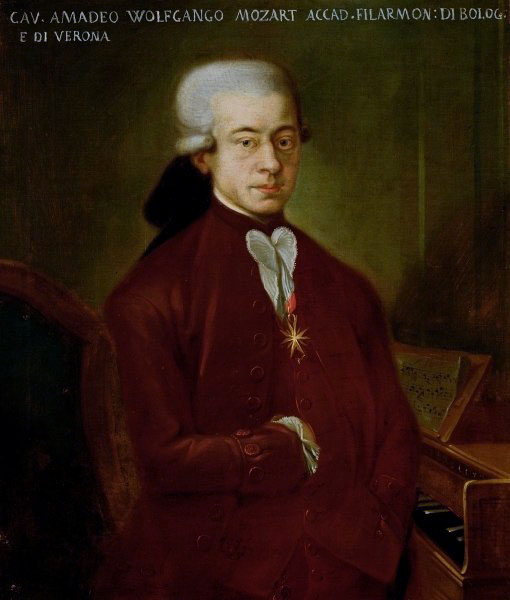
- The young composer, a 1777 copy of a lost painting
- Key: G major
- Catalogue: K. 313
- Genre: Concerto
- Style: Classical period
- Composed: 1778
- Movements: Three (Allegro maestoso, Adagio ma non troppo, Rondo – Tempo di menuetto)
- Scoring: Flute; orchestra

The Flute Concerto No. 1 in G major, K. 313, was written in 1778 by Wolfgang Amadeus Mozart.

Commissioned by the Dutch surgeon and amateur flutist Ferdinand Dejean (1731–1797) in 1777, Mozart was supposed to provide four flute quartets and three flute concertos, yet he only completed two of the three concertos, this one being the first. The Andante for Flute and Orchestra, K. 315, may have been written as an alternative slow movement for this concerto, but there is no extant manuscript and it is therefore difficult to ascertain Mozart's intentions clearly (this also means that current editions are based on the earliest editions rather than an autograph).

== History ==
While travelling to Paris with his mother in 1777–1778, Mozart spent about four months in the German city of Mannheim. During this time, Mozart became acquainted with court flutist Johann Baptist Wendling. It was through Wendling that he came into contact with Ferdinand Dejean, an amateur flutist and local physician and well-known medical scholar who commissioned the works from Mozart. Dejean requested that Mozart provide "three short, simple concerti and a couple of quartets for the flute". In exchange for the works, Dejean, who worked for the Dutch East India Company, offered 200 gold pieces. Mozart was unable to complete the commission, releasing two flute concertos (this one and K. 314 in D major) and three flute quartets. The second flute concerto, however, is merely a transposition of Mozart's Oboe Concerto, K. 314.

=== Mozart's "aversion" of the flute ===
There is some question about whether Mozart liked the flute. The idea that he may not have liked it comes from a letter he wrote to his father about why he had not finished the commission of Ferdinand Dejean.

Herr de Jean, who also travels to Paris tomorrow, has given me only 96 florins as I have not finished more than 2 concertos and 3 quartets for him—he erred by 4 florins in calculating half. But he must pay me in full, for I have already agreed it with Wendling, I will send the rest on afterwards. It is quite natural that I have not been able to finish it. I do not have an hour of peace here. I cannot write except at night, and therefore I cannot get up early either. Nor is one in the mood for working at every time of day; I could of course scribble the whole daylong, but something like this goes out into the world, and there my wish is that I should not need to be ashamed if my name is on it. And then, as you know, I immediately become disinclined if I am always expected to write for an instrument that I cannot stand. From time to time, therefore, for a change, I have done something different, such as clavier duetti with violin, and also worked on the Mass.

This aside, however, there is no source that truly clarifies whether Mozart liked or disliked the instrument. It is possible that he feared the disappointment and anger of his father and merely made up reasons for his delay in completing the commission.

== Movements ==
The concerto is scored for a standard orchestral string section, two oboes (which are replaced with two flutes in the Adagio movement), and two horns. A performance lasts about 25 minutes.

I. Allegro maestoso
Performed by the Skidmore College Orchestra

The piece is divided into three movements:

1. Allegro maestoso, in G major
2. Adagio ma non troppo, in D major
3. Rondo: Tempo di Menuetto, in G major 3/4

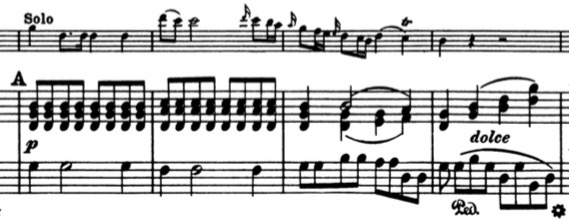
Main theme of movement I

=== I. Allegro maestoso ===
Duration: approximately 8.5 minutes

The first movement is written in sonata form. The exposition contains two themes, the first in G major and the second in the dominant key of G, D major. The two themes also return in the recapitulation, but both return in the key of G. The main theme of the movement is a ritornello and returns many times throughout the movement in both the orchestra and the flute part.

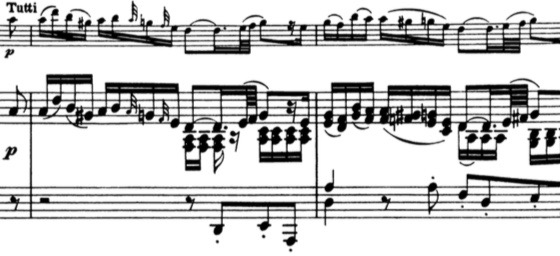
Main theme movement II

=== II. Adagio ma non troppo ===
Duration: approximately 8.5 minutes

The second movement is written in the key of D major. The main theme is introduced by the orchestra and then passed to the solo flute. Of the three movements of the concerto, this one in particular is more of a duet between the soloist and orchestra. Throughout the movement, the soloist and the orchestra create a musical dialogue while passing melodic lines back and forth.

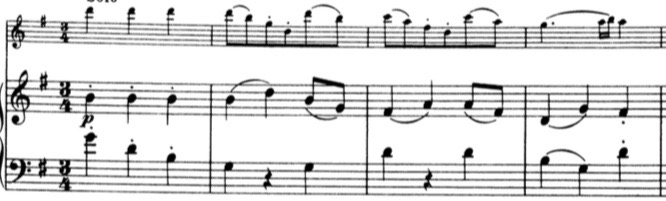
Main theme of movement III

=== III. Rondo: Tempo di menuetto ===
Duration: approximately 7.5 minutes

The recurring theme in the third movement is in the home key of G major. Contrary to the other movements of the concerto, the middle of this movement incorporates a lead-in as opposed to a cadenza.
