= Andante in C for Flute and Orchestra (Mozart) =

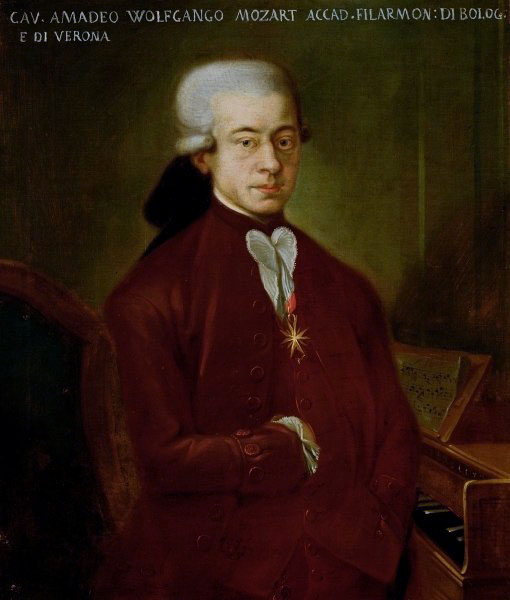
1777 portrait of Mozart

The Andante in C for Flute and Orchestra, K. 315/285e was written by Wolfgang Amadeus Mozart in 1778 and commissioned by Ferdinand De Jean as a possible replacement or alternative second movement for the Flute Concerto No. 1 in G major (K. 313).

Supposedly, the commissioner of the K. 313 concerto, De Jean, disliked the original Adagio and had Mozart compose the shorter Andante to replace it; however, it is also speculated the Andante may have been part of the third flute concerto Mozart was commissioned to write for De Jean but never completed.

The piece is written for the same orchestral arrangement as K. 313: a standard set of orchestral strings, two oboes, and two horns.
