= Giuseppe Ferlendis =

Italian oboist and composer (1755–1810)

Giuseppe Ferlendis (1755 Adrara San Martino – 1810 Lisbon) was an Italian oboist and composer.

== Career ==
In 1777, he was appointed oboist at the Court Chapel of Salzburg, with a yearly stipend of 540 florins (higher than that of Mozart by 40 florins). During his time in Austria, Ferlendis met and earned the esteem of Mozart, who composed a concerto for oboe and orchestra for him—a work that has since been lost. Mozart's Oboe Concerto, K. 314, was dedicated to Ferlendis in 1777. According to François-Joseph Fétis, the Salzburg court orchestra included the English horn—an instrument that still featured a primitive mechanism, which Ferlendis undertook to improve and adapt to the demands of Classical music.

Ferlendis was temperamentally disinclined to stay in one place for long; consequently, following a serious hunting accident, he resigned from his position at the Salzburg court in June 1778.

== Personal life ==
He died in Lisbon. His brother Pietro and his nephews Gerardo, Faustino and Antonio were all professional oboists. His sons Angelo and Alessandro also followed in his artistic footsteps: Angelo, born in Brescia in 1781, was a renowned oboist who worked primarily abroad, in Germany and Russia; Alessandro, born in Venice in 1783, played the oboe and the English horn. He married the Italian singer Camilla Barberi in Lisbon and was active in Italy, Spain, France, and the Netherlands..

== Works ==
- Oboe Concerto No. 1 in F Major (c. 1777)
- Oboe Concerto No. 2 in C Major
- Oboe Concerto No. 3 in C Major
- English Horn Concerto in F Major

== Sources ==
- Alfredo Bernardini, "Ferlendis, Giuseppe" in The New Grove Dictionary of Music and Musicians edited by Stanley Sadie, volume 8, page 682
