= Jeanne Barbillion =

French violinist and composer

- Born: 12 October 1895; Paris
- Died: 8 August 1992 (aged 96) Paris
- Instruments: Piano, violin

Jeanne Marie Louise Barbillion (12 October 1895 – 8 August 1992) was a French pianist, violinist, and composer.

== Life ==
Born in Paris, Barbillion attended the Schola Cantorum de Paris from the age of 8. She was a pupil of Vincent d'Indy (who nicknamed her "the Chameleon") who gave her orchestration lessons, Armand Parent and Berthe Duranton.

In the late 1910s, she performed as a violinist with Vincent d'Indy in pieces by Nicola Porpora, Franz Schubert and Vincent d'Indy.

In the 1920s, she created the Barbillion Quartet, in collaboration with Denise Vidaillet, Edwige Bergeron, Madeleine Portier, and Marcel Vernet. She composed and created several of her works for her quartet, (La tristesse de Pan, 13 March 1926) for example).

In the 1940s, Barbillion taught chamber music at the École César-Franck.

In 1972, she took part in a day in homage to Charles Fourier, for whom she composed a Hymne sylvestre for mixed choir and mezzo-soprano, Scènes champêtres for piano four hands, and En forêt for piano four hands.

In 1926, she lived on Avenue de l'Observatoire. In 1939 she was awarded the title of Officier of the Ordre des Palmes académiques.

Barbillon died in Paris at the age of 96.

== Work ==
- 1926. Provence. Deux pièces, for piano (éd. Maurice-Senart)
- 1926. Sonate en ré majeur, for violin and piano (éd. Maurice-Senart). In concert at la Salle des agriculteurs in June 1925. at the September 1925 Salon d'automne and in concert on radio in June 1927.
- 1928. Trio, for piano, violin and cello (éd. Fortin)
- 1930. Sonate synthétique, for cello and piano (éditions Fortin, 1934)
- 1936. Quatuor à cordes, for two violins, viola and cello
- 1972. Hymne sylvestre, for mixed choir and mezzo-soprano. Score available at la-colonie.org
- 1972. Scènes champêtres, 6 pieces for children ("Sur la route", "Aux champs", "Le ruisseau", "À la ferme", "L’orage", "Le retour"), for piano four hands
- 1972. En forêt ("Jeux", "Soir", "Départ matinal", "Sieste"), for piano four hands.
- Aurora, for male choir
- Automne, for voice and piano
- Chorale et pastorale en rondeau, for ondes Martenot, organ and strings
- Cortège funèbre, for English horn and string orchestra
- Dédicace, for soprano, women's choir and piano
- Two symphonic movements for orchestra
- Étude symphonique for orchestra
- Dorian Hymn, for viola and chromatic harp
- Ile de France, for flute and piano
- Impression maritime, for piano (published by Fortin, 1930)
- Jeanne d'Arc à Rouen, for soloists, choir and orchestra
- Cadence for Beethoven's Violin Concerto
- Pan's Sadness, for baritone, flute, harp and (?)
- The Erinnyes, for soprano, tenor and orchestra
- The Flies, for women's choir
- La noce, nocturne, for voice and piano. In concert at the TSF, 26 June 1927
- Poème d'été, for flute, oboe, cello, bassoon and piano
- Poème, for cello and piano
- Provence, for piano
- Quatuor avec piano, for violin, viola, cello and piano
- Quintette à vent
- Sonate, for piano
- Trio avec piano, for violoi, cello and piano. Prix Marmontel, 1928.
- Variations sur des vieux Noëls, pour quatuor à cordes et orgue. Premiered 25 December 1935 by Maurice Duruflé

== Recording ==
- 1923. Quatuor nº2, (Vincent d'Indy) by the Barbillion quartet. Gramophone W 507 à 509.

== Video ==
- 2020. Sonate, for violin and piano, by Francis Paraïso.
