= Carl Christian Møller =

Danish concertmaster and composer

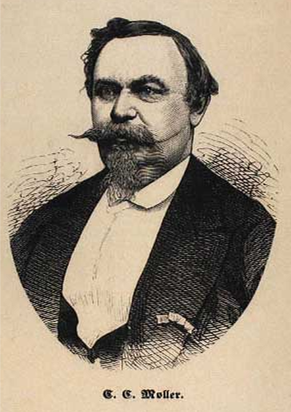
- Carl Christian Møller
- Born: 2 June 1823; Copenhagen, Denmark
- Died: 2 April 1893 (aged 69); Copenhagen, Denmark

Carl Christian Møller (2 June 1823 – 2 April 1893) was a Danish concertmaster and composer. His father was a musician and early in his life Carl Christian was hired in the Danish Civil Artillery Music Corps and later became a musician in the 2nd Brigade Music Corps while also playing in Hans Christian Lumbye's orchestra. He participated in the First Schleswig War as a musician but from the 1850s and the rest of his life he worked as leader of different orchestras, initially travelling ensembles but in 1857-64 and 1875-85 he led the orchestra of Folketeatrets in Copenhagen. From 1875 until his death he was a popular leader of Tivoli's concert band.

== Musical works ==
Carl Christian Møller composed some 300 works, mostly in the style of Lumbye or music for concert bands but he has also written ballet and other theater music. Today he may be best known for Århus Tappenstreg which may paradoxically not entirely be his own composition but is most likely an arrangement of 2 older melodies.

- Fastelavnsgildet (stage music)
- Kalifen paa Æventyr (stage music)
- Esmeralda (stage music)
- Sivertsens døtre (stage music)
- Brud og pavekrone (stage music)
- Far Jean (stage music)
- Fra Sibirien til Moskov (ballet by August Bournonville, 1876)
- 3 Symfonier for Harmoniorkester (1886–88)
- Skarpskyttemarch
- Århus Tappenstreg
- Bataillemarch
- Kong Christian IX’s Revue-march
- Augusta-polka
- Dorothea-polka
- Fanfan-polka
- Telefom-polka
- Euterpe-vals
- Niniche-galop
- Cliquot-galop
- Figaro-galop
- Kunstnerkarneval-galop
- Fakkeldans
