= Stanislas Verroust =

French composer and oboist

Louis Stanislas Xavier Verroust (10 May 1814 – 9 or 11 April 1863) was a French composer and oboist.

== Biography ==
Verroust was born in Hazebrouck on May 10, 1814, into a family of musicians. Verroust's father was head of the National Guard Band in Hazebrouck, and his brother, Charles Verroust was later a famous bassoonist.

In 1831, Verroust joined Gustave Vogt's class at the Paris Conservatoire, He won second prize in oboe in 1833, followed by a first prize in the next year. Also a very good violinist, he became second violinist in the orchestra of the Palais-Royal in 1831. However, he primarily distinguished himself as an oboist playing in places such as the Théâtre de la Porte-Saint-Martin, the Théâtre de la Renaissance and the Opera de Paris.

He taught oboe at the Conservatoire de Paris from 1853 to 1860. However, he was suspended for a few months in 1854 for alcoholism. He succeeded Gustave Vogt in this position and preceded Charles Triébert.

Verroust's published compositions primarily centered around oboe works. All in all, Verroust has 86 published works with his final 2 works being published posthumously.

He died on either 11 April 1863, also in Hazebrouck.

== Works ==
- 24 Etudes for oboe, in 2 suites, op. 65
- 24 Etudes mélodiques for oboe with piano acc., in 4 suites, op. 65 bis

== Bibliography ==
- Constant Pierre, Le Conservatoire national de musique et de déclamation. Historical and administrative documents. Dictionnaire des lauréats, Paris, Imprimerie Nationale, 1900, p. 865
