= David Bennett (musician) =

- Born: 11 December 1823; Carlisle, England
- Died: 9 August 1902 (aged 78); St. John's, Newfoundland
- Occupation(s): Drummer, bandleader, soldier
- Instrument: Drums

David Bennett (11 December 1823 – 9 August 1902) was a soldier and musician from Newfoundland Colony.

Bennett was born in Carlisle, England and came to Newfoundland at a young age. He joined the Royal Newfoundland Companies in 1838 at age 14 where he was trained as a musician. Upon retirement after almost 25 years, he was chosen by Bishop Mullock to head the music program at the recently opened Saint Bonaventure's College.

Bennett became an important figure in the musical fabric of the St. John's community.

Bennett died 9 August 1902 in St. John's, Newfoundland.
