= Theodor Julius Jaffé =

German actor

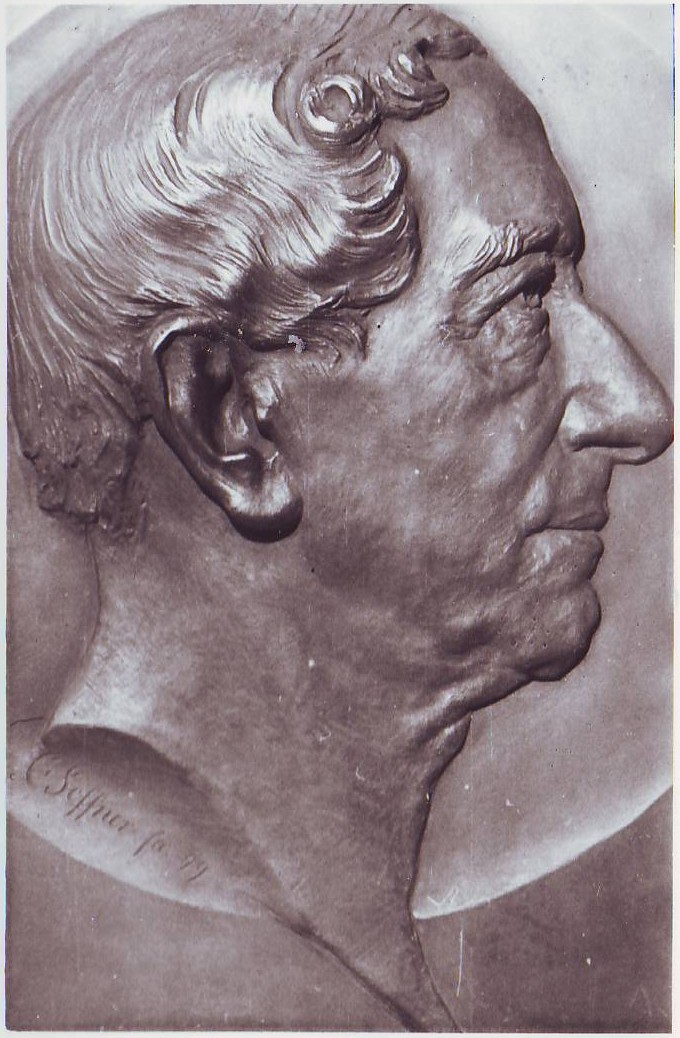
Julius Jaffe

Theodor Julius Jaffé (August 17, 1823 – April 11, 1898) was a German actor.

== Life ==
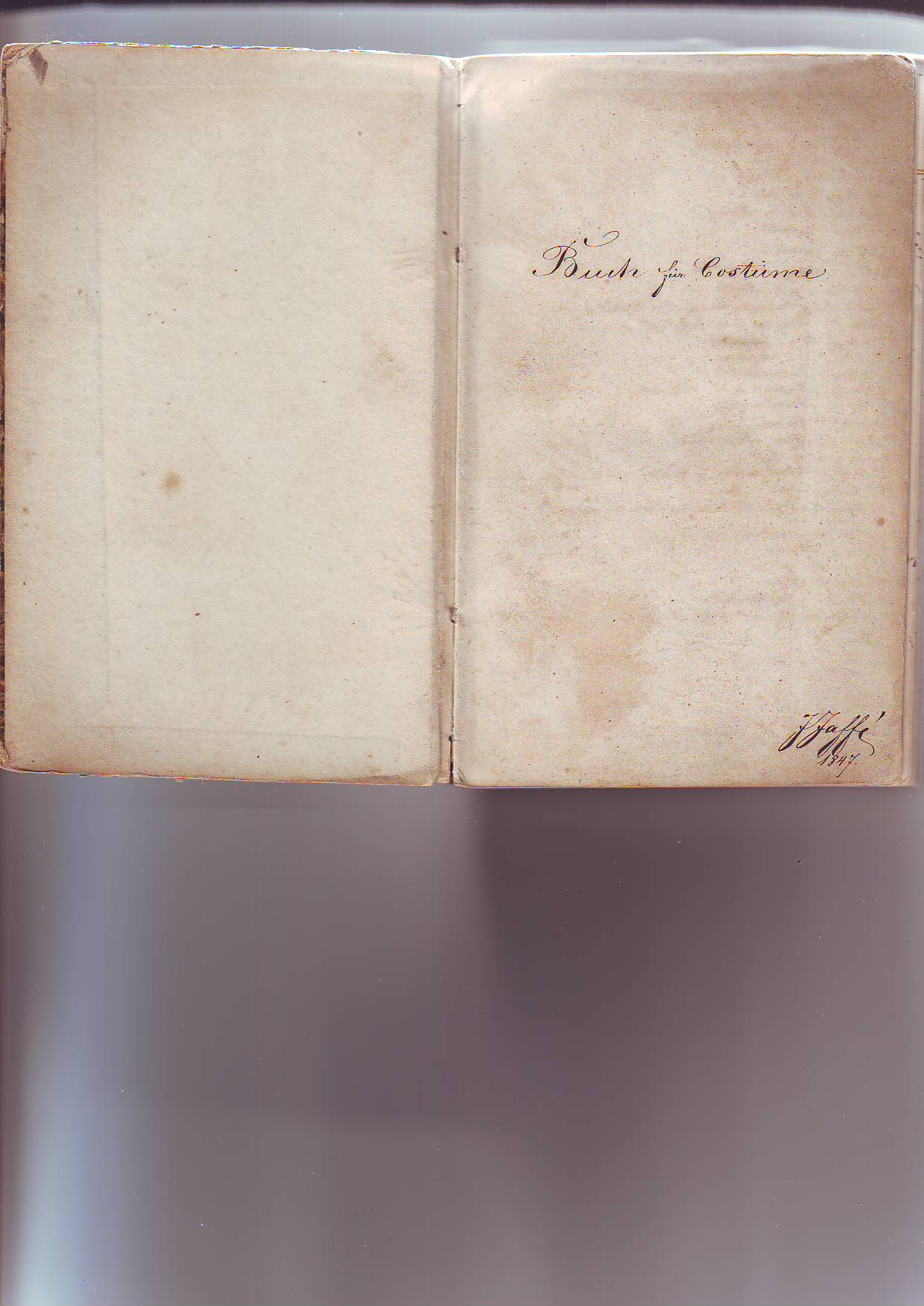
Julius Jaffe' original costume book

Julius Jaffé was born in Berlin to the Jaffé family. His father was a Jewish merchant who wanted his son to become a lawyer. However, since he had a fine bass, he decided to become a singer and studied with Kugler and Joseph Elssler in Berlin, then with Giovanni Gentiluomo in Vienna. In 1844 he appeared as an opera-singer in Opava, Austrian Silesia, and then in Lübeck, Halle, Magdeburg, and Cologne. In 1847 he abandoned opera and became an actor. He filled engagements in Bremen (1847–49), Weimar (1849–53), Breslau (1853–56), and in Braunschweig. In 1864 he went to Dresden as successor to Dawison, and was the leading actor of the royal theater there for thirty years. In 1894 he retired with the honorary degree of professor. He took every opportunity to visit the leading German theaters of Europe. He died in Dresden.

He celebrated his stag night on 13th May 1851 with Franz Liszt.

The image shown is from his grave, salvaged after damage from World War II bombing. This grave plaque was sculpted by Carl Seffner.

== Performances ==
- Nathan der Weise, Richard III, Shylock, Iago, Franz Moor, Philipp II., Carlos, Tartuffe, Mephistopheles, etc.

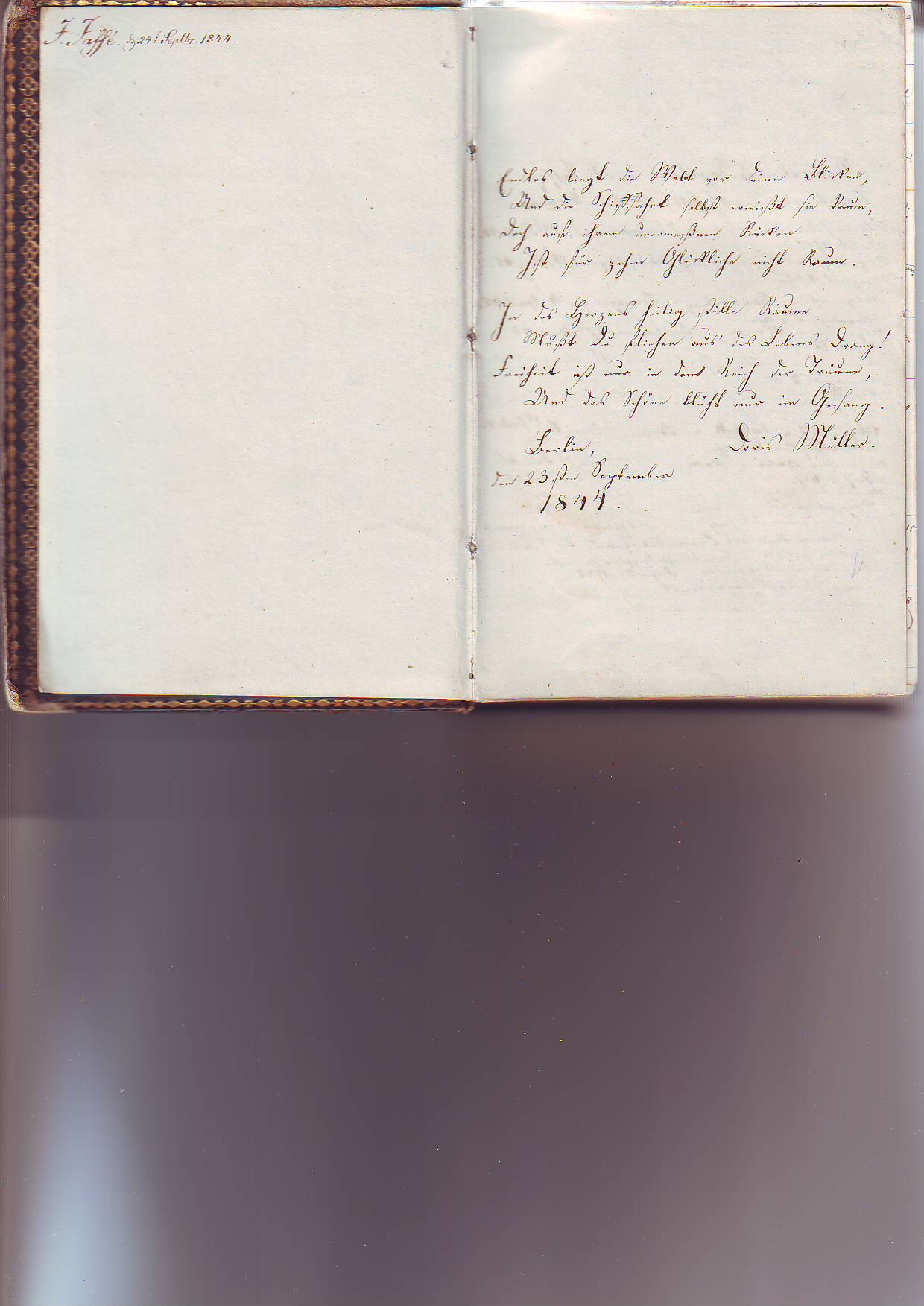
Julius Jaffe's original theatre diary
