= Michel Wiblé =

Swiss composer (1923–2020)

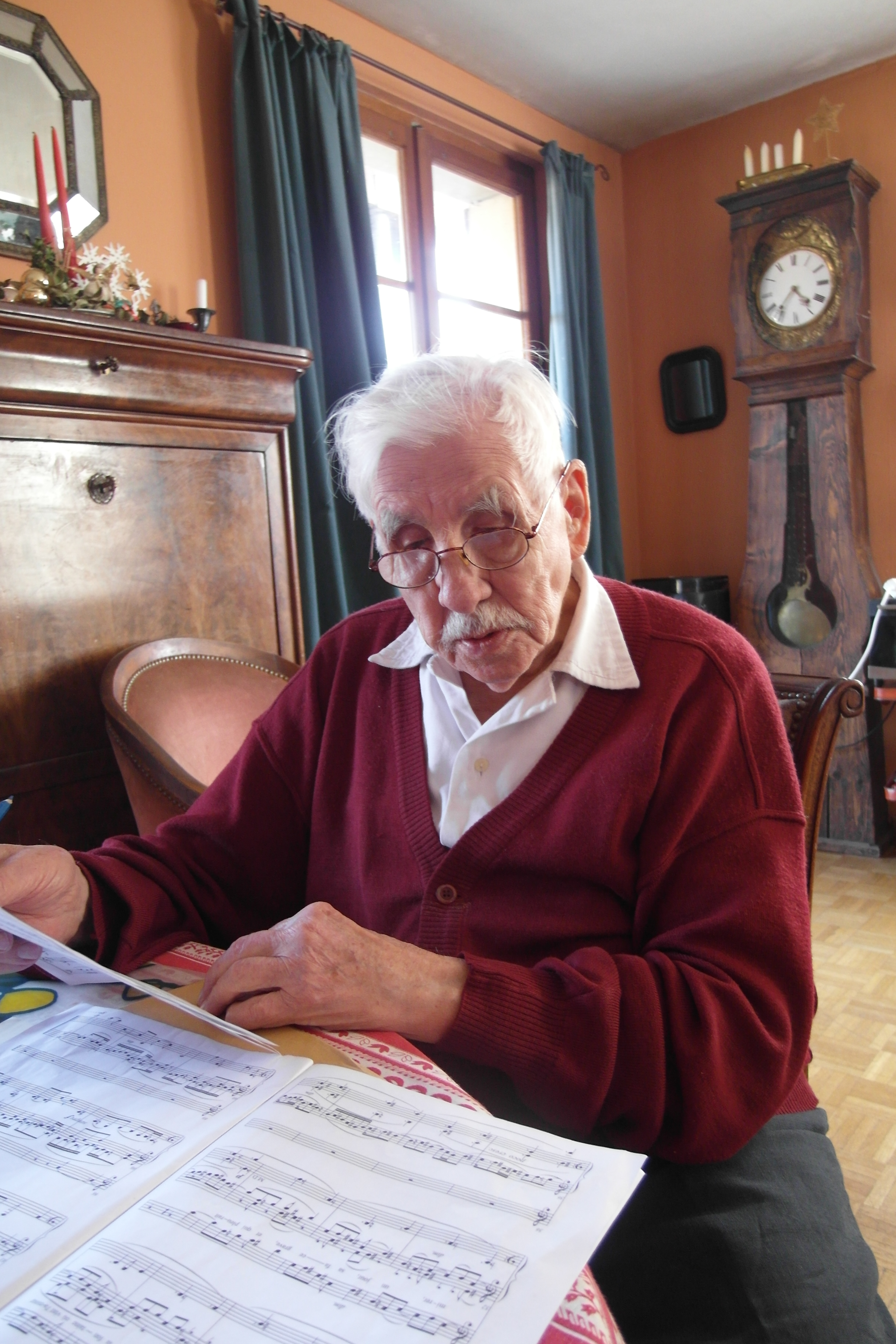
- Michel Wiblé, composer, on his 89th birthday.
- Born: 24 February 1923; Geneva, Switzerland
- Died: 4 April 2020 (aged 97); Geneva, Switzerland
- Occupations: Composer; Teacher

Michel Wiblé (24 February 1923 – 4 April 2020) was a Swiss composer and teacher.

== Biography ==
Wiblé was born in Geneva in 1923 into a family of amateur musicians. His father regularly played the violin, and he learned piano with his mother.

He studied at Collège Calvin, choosing to major in music after listening to Mathis der Maler by Paul Hindemith. He then entered the Conservatoire de Musique de Genève, studying oboe with Paul Dennes (an oboe soloist with the Orchestre de la Suisse Romande) and theoretical branches with Henri Gagnebin. He worked composition for Frank Martin for two years, and then continued studying music in Paris.

He joined the Orchestre de la Suisse Romande in 1944 as an oboist. He left the orchestra in 1965 to focus on composition and teaching. He created a course in music teaching at the Conservatoire de Musique de Genève for music teachers in public education.

Wiblé died on 4 April 2020 in Geneva at the age of 97. His works were created almost entirely in Geneva or were broadcast on the radio. His scores are now deposited at the library at the Conservatoire de Musique de Genève.
