= Ciro in Armenia =

Opera by Maria Teresa Agnesi Pinottini

- Opera by Maria Teresa Agnesi Pinottini
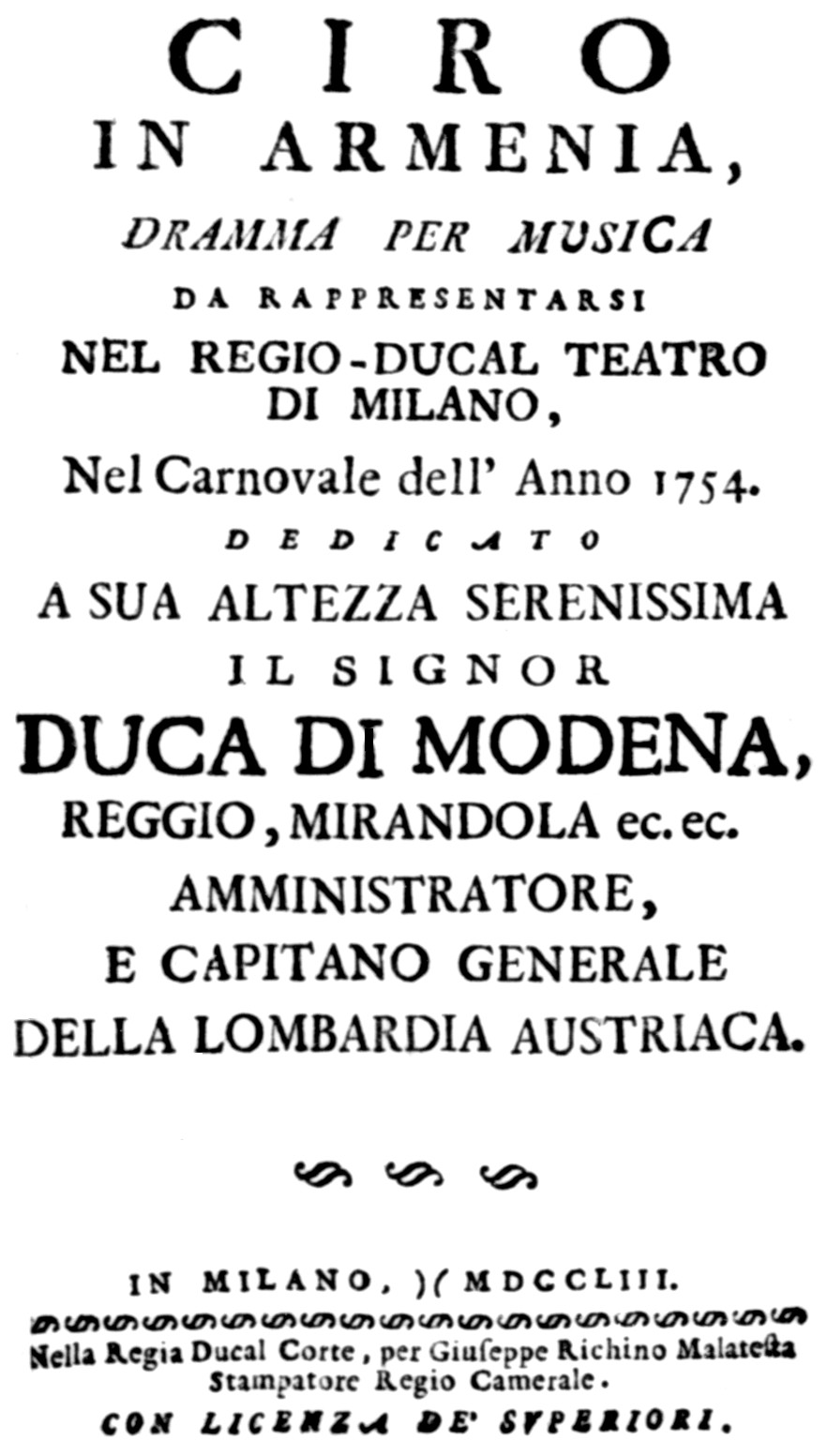
- Title page of the libretto
- Librettist: Pinottini
- Language: Italian
- Based on: work by Umberto Manferrari and G. Manfredi
- Premiere: 26 December 1753 (Carnival season); Teatro Regio Ducale, Milan

Ciro in Armenia is a dramma per musica or opera in three acts by composer Maria Teresa Agnesi Pinottini. The work premiered in Milan on 26 December 1753 at the Teatro Regio Ducale. The work uses an Italian language libretto by the composer which is based on a work by Umberto Manferrari and G. Manfredi.

== Background ==
Pinottini was one of the earliest female Italian opera composers, and this opera was considered her finest achievement. Pinottini had previously composed two other operas; the first of which, II Restauro di Arcadia, also premiered at the Teatro Regio Ducal in 1747.

The complete score of Ciro in Armenia was preserved in Dresden, but was transferred by the Red Army during World War II to Russia. Today it is owned by the Russian State Library in Moscow. Parts from the opera survive also in the collection of the library at the Milan Conservatory, some of which have been recorded. Tom Service, music critic for The Guardian, included the work is his 2015 list of the 10 best operas written by women composers.

== Roles ==
The information in this section is taken from the published libretto.

Role	Voice type	Premiere cast, 26 December 1753
Ciro (Cyrus the Younger of Persia)		Domenico Luino
Semira, Ciro's sister		Camilla Mattei
Araspe, Ciro's general		Antonio Priori
Arsace, King of Armenia		Litterio Ferrari
Tigrane, son of Arsace		Giovanni Tedeschi
Palmide, princess of Phrygia, affianced to Tigrane.		Colomba Mattei

== Synopsis ==
The story is elaborated (unhistorically) from Xenophon's account in his Anabasis of Cyrus the Younger's campaign in 401 BC. The plot centres on the plans of Ciro (Cyrus) to wage war against Assyria in league with the Medes. However the King of Armenia, formerly a vassal of the Medes, changes allegiance to side with the Assyrians, prompting Cyrus to invade Armenia. Cyrus quickly overwhelms the Armenians. Tigrane, son of the Armenian King Arsace, was a childhood friend of Ciro and persuades him generously to forgive Arsace, allowing the marriage of Tigrane with the Phrygian princess Palmide.
