= Johan Wikmanson =

Swedish organist and composer

Johan Wikmanson (28 December 1753 – 10 January 1800) was a Swedish organist and composer.

== Biography ==
Wikmanson was born in Stockholm and, except for 18 months spent in Copenhagen studying mathematics and instrument making, lived his entire life in the Swedish capital. He was reputed to be a superb organist and for many years held the post of organist at the Storkyrkan, Stockholm's principal church. He was also an accomplished cellist. His teachers included Abbé Georg Joseph Vogler and Joseph Martin Kraus.

Nonetheless, like most Swedish musicians of this era, he was unable to earn his living solely as a practicing musician and was forced to find employment as a government accountant, working for the Royal Swedish National Lottery. He did, however, obtain some recognition during his lifetime. In 1788, he was made a member of the Swedish Royal Academy and later was put in charge of its music program.

As a composer, Wikmanson is remembered for his five string quartets, all published after his early death from tuberculosis in 1800. His close friend, Gustav Silverstolpe, published what he felt were the three best at his own expense, titling them Opus 1. Later, Silverstolpe gave the rights to the well-known German publisher Breitkopf and Härtel, hoping they would publish the quartets and hence give them wider circulation. However, this appears not to have happened. No new edition appeared for more than 170 years. In the 1970s the Swedish firm of Edition Reimers published all three quartets of the Op.1 and recently (2006) Edition Silvertrust brought out a new edition of String Quartet No.1 in d minor, Op.1 No.1

It is not known exactly when Wikmanson composed the Opus 1 string quartets, as Silverstolpe called them. They were not, however, his first work, and probably were among his last works. Of the five quartets, most scholars believe the so-called First Quartet was probably his fifth and last. Evidence supports this, as Silverstolpe placed what he considered the strongest work first in the set of three that he published. This was common practice, because it was generally felt that the first work of a published set had to be strong to interest players in the others in the set. The weakest was usually placed in the middle and another strong work at the end. The Op.1 Quartets were dedicated to Haydn, albeit posthumously. Though Wikmanson did not know Haydn personally, it is clear that he was familiar with Haydn's quartets, including the Op.76, published in 1799, the year before his death. Haydn for his part, was impressed by these works and tried, unsuccessfully, to stimulate interest in them.

String Quartet No.1 is in four movements—Allegro—Adagio—Minuetto and Allegro. Critics consider it the equal of any of Haydn's Op.64 quartets and, in some ways, in advance of them, particularly in its excellent use of the viola and cello. The most striking movement is the Adagio, a powerful funeral march—which was performed at Wikmanson's own funeral. It is reminiscent of the slow movement to Haydn's Op.20 No.2, one of the finest Haydn ever wrote. The minuet is also grave in mood although its lovely trio is much like an Austrian Ländler. The finale features a wild racing melody with a surprise ending.

Wikmanson also contributed music to two pasticcio operas, Äfventyraren (1791) and Eremiten (1798). Both premiered in Stockholm.

Wikmanson's music has been discussed and catalogued by musicologist Carl Gabriel Stellan Mörner

List of Theoretical Works Choral-Bok Clavérschola Afhandling om Manererne uti Musiquen (Translation of Giuseppe Tartini, Traité des agreements del la musique)

List of Compositions (Informally designated SMW for Stellan Mörner Wikmanson)

1. Minuet for Orchestra
2. String Quartet in d minor
3. String Quartet in e minor
4. String Quartet in B-flat major
5. String Quartet in B-flat major
6. String Quartet
7. String Quartet
8. Thema senza Variationi
9. Sonata in C major for Fortepiano
10. Sonata in B minor for Fortepiano
11. Sonata for Cittern
12. Sonatina for Cittern
13. Sonatina for Cittern
14. Divertissement på Söderforss for Keyboard
15. Theme and 7 Variations for Keyboard
16. Romance for Keyboard
17. Fragmenter för min lilla flicka for Keyboard
18. Solo for Violoncello
19. Solo for Violoncello
20. Andante for Organ
21. Offer Choeur from Äfventyraren
22. Finale from Eremiten
23. Concert Recitative and Aria “Han försvann—Länge glad af hoppet ford”
24. Chorus with Orchestra “Syskon af vänskapens heliga röst”
25. Sammelsurium af Wisor och Små Sångstycken
26. Häckningen
27. Lied “Jorden af Skaparen nydanad låg”
28. Lied “Lärde med fåfäng kunskap blänka”
29. Lied “Han, som en dag skall verlden dömma”
30. Lied “Det bör ej någon plåga ge”
31. Lieder for Men’s Quartet
