= Oboe Concerto (Mozart) =

1777 composition by W. A. Mozart

- by W. A. Mozart
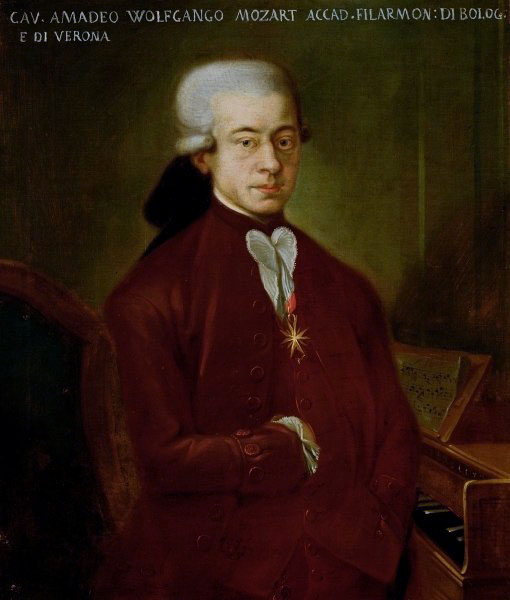
- Mozart, 1777 copy of a lost painting
- Key: C major
- Catalogue: K. 314
- Genre: Concerto
- Style: Classical period
- Composed: 1777
- Movements: Three (Allegro aperto, Adagio ma non troppo, Rondo – Allegro)
- Scoring: Oboe; orchestra

Wolfgang Amadeus Mozart's Oboe Concerto in C major, K. 314 (271k), was composed in the spring or summer of 1777, for the oboist Giuseppe Ferlendis (1755–1802) from Bergamo. In 1778, Mozart re-worked it as a concerto for flute in D major. The concerto is a widely studied piece for both instruments and is one of the most important concertos in the oboe repertoire.

== Movements ==
I. Allegro aperto

II. Adagio non troppo

III. Rondo: Allegretto

As with his Flute Concerto No. 1, the piece is orchestrated for a standard string section (violin I/II, viola and cello/double bass doubling the bass line), two oboes, and two horns in D/C. The first and last movements are in the home key of C major, while the second movement is in the subdominant key of F major.

The piece is divided into three movements:

1. Allegro aperto
2. Adagio non troppo
3. Rondo: Allegretto

== Flute Concerto No. 2 ==
Flute Concerto in D major
- No. 2
- adaptation by W. A. Mozart
- Key: D major
- Composed: 1778

The Flute Concerto No. 2 in D major, K. 314 (285d) is an adaptation of the original oboe concerto. Dutch flautist Ferdinand Dejean (1731–1797) commissioned Mozart for four flute quartets and three flute concerti, of which Mozart only completed three quartets and one new flute concerto. Instead of creating a new second concerto, Mozart rearranged the oboe concerto he had written a year earlier as the second flute concerto, although with substantial changes for it to fit with what the composer deemed flute-like. However, Dejean did not pay Mozart for this concerto because it was based on the oboe concerto.

== Origin ==
In the 1800s and early 1900s, the oboe concerto was presumed to be lost, while the flute concerto in D remained known. The oboe concerto was rediscovered by Bernhard Paumgartner in 1920, who found a handwritten set of parts in the Salzburg Mozarteum archives, and recognized the similarity with the flute concerto in D. Alfred Einstein, editor of the third edition of the Köchel catalogue (1937), noted that both a D major and a C major copy of the K. 314 concerto existed in the library of the Gesellschaft der Musikfreunde in Vienna. From this and also from Paumgartner's discovery, Einstein concluded that the concerto was originally for oboe. The priority of the oboe version is supported by Mozart's letters, as well as various evidence from the music itself. For example, according to Einstein in his Mozart: His Character, His Work and Paumgartner in his Mozart-Jahrbuch, the violins in the D major version never go below the A on the G string, suggesting that C major was the original key and D major was a transposition. For the same reason, the violas in the D major version never go below the D on the C string. Perhaps the most convincing piece of evidence is that, in the Flute Concerto in D major, the flute never plays above an E, whereas in the Flute Concerto No. 1 in G major, the flute regularly plays up to a G. This is because the Flute Concerto in D major is originally the Oboe Concerto in C major and the oboe has a lower range than the flute.

No autograph score has survived. The only known autograph fragment consists of nine measures discovered in 1971, partly duplicating the Oboe Concerto in C major and partly proceeding with previously unknown material.

== See also ==
The first movement of Mozart's unfinished Oboe Concerto in F major, K. 293 (1778) has been completed by the Mozart scholar and pianist Robert D. Levin, and by the musicologist William Drabkin in 2015.
