= Gustave Vogt =

French oboist and composer

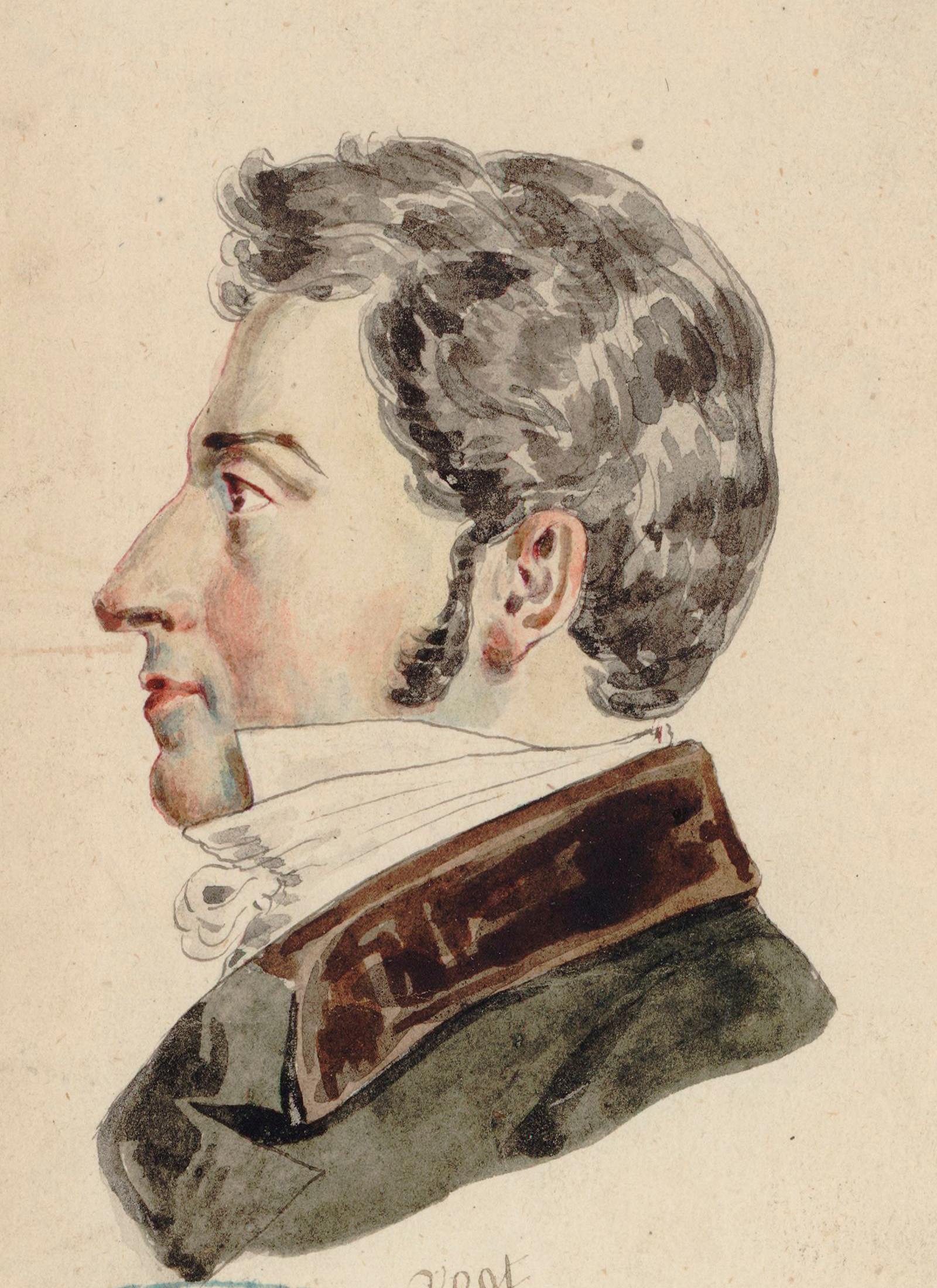
- Born: 18 March 1781; Strasbourg, France
- Died: 20 May 1870 (aged 89); Paris
- Education: Conservatoire de Paris
- Occupations: Oboist; Music educator
- Organizations: Conservatoire de Paris
- Awards: Chevalier of the Legion of Honour

Gustave Vogt (18 March 1781 – 20 May 1870) was a French oboist and composer.

== Biography ==
Born in Strasbourg, Vogt followed his parents to Paris at a very young age, where he entered the Conservatoire de Paris on 7 July 1798 and became a pupil of François Sallantin for oboe. He made such rapid progress that he was awarded a First Prize in this instrument at the end of the following year. He later attended the harmony course of Jean-Baptiste Rey at the same institution.

Vogt entered the orchestra of the Théâtre Montansier as second oboe in 1798, then joined that of the Théâtre de l'Ambigu-Comique, from where he passed, on 31 May 1801, to the Comédie Italienne of the Théâtre de la Victoire, as its first oboe. Vogt then followed Emperor Napoleon as oboist of the music of the Imperial Guard during the 1805 campaign. At the same time as the Battle of Austerlitz, he met Joseph Haydn and Ludwig van Beethoven in Vienna. Back in Paris, he was the first oboe of the Théâtre Feydeau and kept this post until 1814. He then joined the Paris Opéra as successor of his teacher Sallantin. He remained there until 1854, the time of his retirement.

After he became a member of the Orchestre de la Société des Concerts du Conservatoire in 1838, he played first oboe there until 1844. In 1835, he was called to London for the season as first oboe of the Philharmonic Society. In 1838, Vogt made a second trip to London and spent the entire season there, being sought after for his talent in all musical societies. Back in Paris, he returned to his position as first oboe of the Société des Concerts du Conservatoire, where he was as much noticed by the beauty of the sound he derived from the instrument as by the quality of his performance.

As early as 1808, he had been appointed assistant professor of oboe at the Conservatory, where he became a full professor during the new organisation of 1816. He formed there all the French oboists who made a name for themselves at that time, particularly Henri Brod, Stanislas Verroust, Vinit, Barré, Lavigne, de La Barre and many others. Appointed first oboe of the King's Chapell in 1815, he retained this position until the 1830 July Revolution. In 1839, he was awarded the Order of the Légion d'honneur. Vogt retired from teaching at the Conservatory in 1853.

== Works ==
- Airs du ballet de Nina et de l'Épreuve villageoise, arrangés en sérénade pour des instruments à vent, Paris, Frey
- La Bordelaise, grande marche militaire en harmonie, Paris, A. Petit
- Sérénade pour harmonie militaire, Paris, Frey
- Première sérénade sur un choix d'airs d’opéras, ibid.
- Trois nocturnes ou pots-pourris d'airs connus pour flûte, hautbois, cor et basson, Paris, Pleyel
- Concertos pour hautbois et orchestre, no. 1 (in F); no. 3 (in D minor), Paris, Pleyel
- Romance de Joseph variée pour le hautbois, avec orchestre, Paris, Sieber
- Trois airs variés idem, Paris, Janet
- Solo du Carnaval de Venise varié idem, ibid.
- Troisième concerto pour hautbois et orchestre, Paris, Janet
- Lettre A. Solo pour cor anglais et orchestre, Paris, Richault
- Air varié pour hautbois avec orchestre ou piano, lettre B, ibid.
- Concerto pour hautbois et orchestre ou piano, lettre C, ibid.
- Duo pour deux hautbois et orchestre ou piano , ibid.
- Mélodie anglaise variée, pour le hautbois et l’orchestre ou le piano, ibid.
- Quatrième concertino pour hautbois, Paris, Costallat
- Adagio religioso, trio pour deux hautbois et cor anglais, Paris, Richault
- Fantaisie et variations sur un thème russe, pour hautbois avec accompagnement de piano, ibid.
- Six Solos de concert pour le hautbois avec accompagnement de piano, ibid.

== Bibliography ==
- Geoffrey Burgess: The Premier Oboist of Europe: A Portrait of Gustave Vogt (Lanham, MD: The Scarecrow Press, 2003), ISBN 9780810848511.
- François-Joseph Fétis, Biographie universelle des musiciens, vol. 8 (Paris: Firmin-Didot, 1870), pp. 380–381.
- Geneviève Honegger: "Gustave Vogt", in Nouveau Dictionnaire de biographie alsacienne, vol. 38, p. 4028.
