= Maria Teresa Agnesi Pinottini =

Italian composer

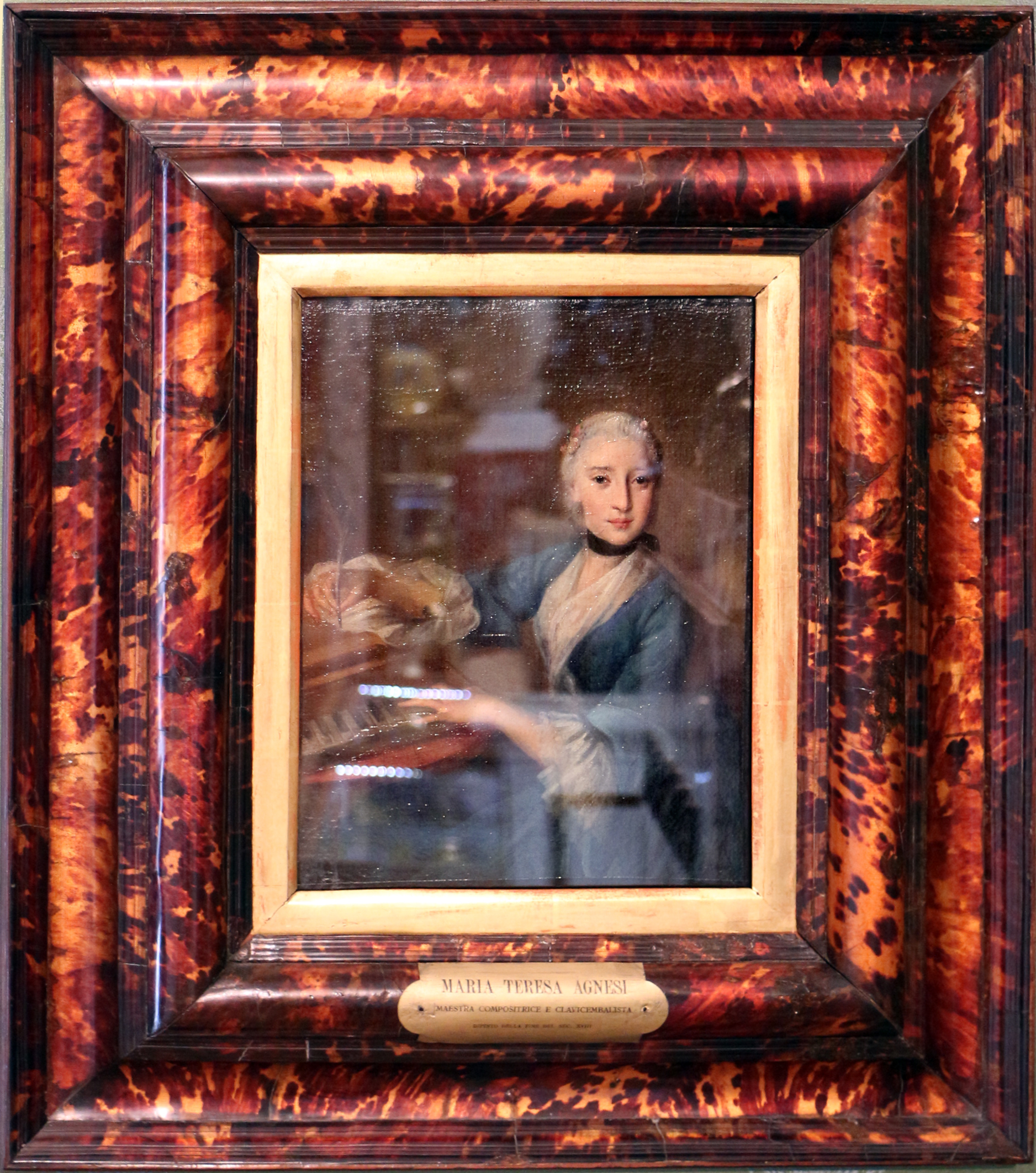
Maria Teresa Agnesi Pinottini.

Maria Teresa Agnesi Pinottini (Italian pronunciation: [maˈriːa teˈrɛːza aɲˈɲeːzi pinotˈtiːni, -ɲɛːz-]; née Agnesi; 17 October 1720 – 19 January 1795) was an Italian composer. Though she was most famous for her compositions, she was also an accomplished harpsichordist and singer, and the majority of her surviving compositions were written for keyboard, the voice, or both.

== Life ==
Maria Teresa was born in Milan to Pietro Agnesi, a member of the lesser nobility. He provided early education for both Maria Teresa and her more famous older sister, Maria Gaetana, a mathematics and language prodigy who lectured and debated all over Europe while her sister performed. It was this education that allowed for Maria Teresa to fulfill her passion for music. Maria Teresa was married to Pier Antonio Pinottini on 13 June 1752, and they settled in a district populated by intellects and artists, but eventually suffered severe financial ruin. Pinottini died not too long afterwards.

Maria Teresa died in Milan in 1795.

== Career ==
Maria Teresa had several famous performances, perhaps the most famous on 16 July 1739, when famous French traveller Charles de Brosses was very impressed by her music. He was not the only one; Count Gerolamo Riccati wrote several letters praising her compositions and musical talent. Another very famous performance was her theatrical debut, the Cantata Pastorale Il Ristoro d'Arcadia, in Milan at the Teatro Regio Ducale in 1747 where she dedicated her piece to various rulers of the surrounding areas of Saxony and Austria.

Agnesi would enjoy the patronage of Maria Theresa, Holy Roman Empress and sovereign of Lombardy, and Maria Antonia Walpurgis, a gifted composer and contemporary. The Empress was said to have sung at Maria Teresa Agnesi's famous 1747 performance.

== Legacy and influence ==
Her keyboard music was frequently technically challenging and was widely circulated during her lifetime and is representative of the northern Italian style of the period. Her work does seem to have evolved throughout her career; her early works are simple and clean, while her later works are more virtuosic, complex, and melodramatic. Her compositions were well-received in courts like Vienna and Dresden, where elegantly designed copies of some of her works were produced.

== Compositions ==
Operas

- II Restauro di Arcadia (cant. pastorale, G. Riviera), Milan, Teatro Regio Ducale, 1747 (lost)
- La Sofonisba (dramma eroico, 3, G.F. Zanetti)
- Ciro in Armenia (dramma serio, 3, ? Agnesi), Milan, Teatro Regio Ducale, 26 Dec 1753, Act 3 frags
- Il re pastore (dramma serio, 3, P. Metastasio), 1755?
- La Insubria Consolata (Componimento drammatico, 2), Milan, 1766-Nitocri (dramma serio, 3, A. Zeno), Act 2 frags
- Ulisse in Campania (serenata, 2)

Keyboard, small ensemble, vocal music

- 12 arias, S, 2
- Aria en Murki: Still, stille Mann!
- 4 concertos (F, F, F, D) (str pts missing in A-Wn, D-Dl), 1 cited in 1766 Breitkopf catalogue
- Sonata, G, cited in 1767 Breitkopf catalogue (1998)
- Sonata, F (1992)
- Allegro ou Presto
- Allemande militare & Menuetto grazioso, kbd (with special stops), ed. F. Brodszky, -Thesaurus Musicus, xvii (1962)
- Lost: conc., Eâ, hpd, cited in 1766 Breitkopf catalogue; sonata, G, kbd, cited in 1767—Breitkopf catalogue; Airs divers

== Discography ==
- Hofkomponistinnen in Europa: Aus Boudoir und Gärten, Vol. 2
- Sonata for Harpsichord in G Major
- CD “Note Femminill”-Concerto
