= List of transposing instruments =

This is a list of transposing instruments and their transposition. Transposing instruments are instruments for which the convention is to write music notation transposed relative to concert pitch.

| Instrument family | Instrument name | The note C_{4} written down produces: | Comment |
|---|---|---|---|
| Accordion | Bass accordion | C_{2} | |
| Arpeggione | | C_{2}/C_{3} | |
| Bagpipe | Great Highland bagpipe | variable D♭_{4 -} D_{4} | A minority of bagpipes, made for playing with other instruments, are exactly D♭_{4} (referred to as B♭, relative to the tonic note A rather than C). Most bagpipes are sharper than this, between D♭_{4} and D_{4}._{.} |
| Bagpipe | Northumbrian smallpipes in F or F+ | B♭_{4} for F (~20 cents sharp for F+) | Older and traditionally made instruments use a pitch sharp of F described as F+ (F-plus) |
| Bajo Sexto (or Bajo Quinto) | Bajo Sexto | C_{2} | - |
| Banjo | Banjo | C_{3} | |
| Banjo | Tenor banjo | C_{3} | |
| Bassoon | Tenoroon | F_{4} | |
| Bassoon | Contrabassoon | C_{3} | |
| Bugle | Soprano bugle Mellophone bugle French horn bugle | G_{3} | |
| Bugle | Baritone bugle Euphonium bugle | G_{2} | |
| Bugle | Contrabass bugle | G_{1} | |
| Carillon | | Various | Since they are seldom played in concert with other instruments and carillonneurs need standardized sheet music, carillons often transpose to a variety of keys—whichever is advantageous for the particular installation; many transposing carillons weigh little, have many bells, or were constructed on limited funds. An increasing number of new carillons have been installed in concert pitch as a result of the desire to establish the carillon as a full-fledged concert instrument. |
| Celesta | | C_{5} | |
| Clarinet^{a} | A♭ clarinet | A♭_{4} | |
| Clarinet^{a} | G piccolo clarinet | G_{4} | |
| Clarinet^{a} | E♭ clarinet | E♭_{4} | |
| Clarinet^{a} | D clarinet | D_{4} | |
| Clarinet^{a} | B♭ clarinet | B♭_{3} | |
| Clarinet^{a} | A soprano clarinet Basset clarinet | A_{3} | |
| Clarinet^{a} | G soprano clarinet Clarinet d’amour | G_{3} | |
| Clarinet^{a} | Basset horn | F_{3} | |
| Clarinet^{a} | Alto clarinet | E♭_{3} | |
| Clarinet^{a} | Bass clarinet | B♭_{2} | |
| Clarinet^{a} | Contra-alto clarinet | E♭_{2} | |
| Clarinet^{a} | Contrabass clarinet | B♭_{1} | |
| Clarinet^{a} | Octocontra-alto clarinet | E♭_{1} | |
| Clarinet^{a} | B♭ octocontrabass clarinet | B♭_{0} | |
| Cornet | Soprano cornet | E♭_{4} | |
| Cornet | Cornet | B♭_{3} | |
| Crotales | | C_{6} | |
| Csakan | | A♭_{4} | |
| Euphonium | | B♭_{2} | When notated in treble clef |
| Fife | Folk B♭ fife | A♭_{4} | |
| Flute | D♭ piccolo | D♭_{5} | |
| Flute | Piccolo | C_{5} | |
| Flute | Treble flute | G_{4} | |
| Flute | F soprano flute | F_{4} | |
| Flute | Soprano flute | E♭_{4} | |
| Flute | D♭ Flute | D♭_{4} | |
| Flute | B♭ flûte d'amour | B♭_{3} | |
| Flute | A flûte d'amour | A_{3} | |
| Flute | Alto flute | G_{3} | |
| Flute | Bass flute | C_{3} | |
| Flute | Contra-alto flute | G_{2} | |
| Flute | Contrabass flute | C_{2} | |
| Flute | Subcontrabass flute | G_{1} | |
| Flute | F subcontrabass flute | F_{1} | |
| Flute | Double contrabass flute | C_{1} | |
| Flute | Hyperbass flute | C_{0} | |
| Glockenspiel | | C_{6} | |
| Guitar | Guitar | C_{3} | |
| Handbells | | C_{5} | |
| Hardanger Fiddle | | D_{4} | |
| Horn | Marching horn | B♭_{3} | |
| Horn | Horn | F_{3} | |
| Mellophone | Mellophone | F_{3} | |
| Oboe | F piccolo oboe | F_{4} | |
| Oboe | E♭ piccolo oboe | E♭_{4} | |
| Oboe | Oboe d'amore | A_{3} | |
| Oboe | Cor anglais | F_{3} | |
| Oboe | Heckelphone and Bass oboe | C_{3} | |
| Oud | | G_{2} | Bolahenk tuning |
| Recorder | Garklein recorder | C_{6} | |
| Recorder | Sopranino recorder | C_{5}/F_{5} | |
| Recorder | Soprano recorder | C_{5}, formerly G_{4} | |
| Recorder | B♭ Soprano recorder | B♭_{4} | |
| Recorder | Alto recorder | C_{5} sometimes | |
| Recorder | Voice flute | formerly A_{3} | |
| Recorder | Tenor recorder | formerly G_{3} | Modern convention is to notate all recorders as transposed at the octave where necessary; in this case the tenor recorder sounds at pitch. |
| Recorder | Basset recorder | C_{3} | |
| Recorder | Bass recorder | C_{3} | When notated in treble clef |
| Recorder | Great bass recorder | C_{2} | |
| Recorder | Contrabass recorder | C_{2} | |
| Saxhorns | Flugelhorn | B♭_{3} | |
| Saxhorns | Tenor horn | E♭_{3} | |
| Saxhorns | Baritone horn | B♭_{2} | When notated in treble clef |
| Saxophone | Piccolo saxophone | B♭_{4} | |
| Saxophone | Sopranino saxophone | E♭_{4} | |
| Saxophone | Soprano saxophone | B♭_{3} | |
| Saxophone | F alto saxophone | F_{3} | |
| Saxophone | Alto saxophone | E♭_{3} | |
| Saxophone | C melody saxophone | C_{3} | |
| Saxophone | Tenor saxophone | B♭_{2} | |
| Saxophone | Baritone saxophone | E♭_{2} | |
| Saxophone | Bass saxophone | B♭_{1} | |
| Saxophone | Contrabass saxophone | E♭_{1} | |
| Saxophone | Subcontrabass saxophone | B♭_{0} | |
| Tin whistle | | C_{5} | Transposes at the octave. Some whistle players treat whistles pitched higher or lower than the "standard" D tin whistle as (additionally) transposing instruments. |
| Trombone | Tenor trombone | B♭_{2} | When notated in treble clef in a British-style brass band |
| Trombone | Soprano trombone | B♭_{3} | When notated like a B♭ trumpet; otherwise, in concert pitch |
| Trumpet | C Piccolo Trumpet | C_{5} | |
| Trumpet | Piccolo trumpet | B♭_{4} | |
| Trumpet | Piccolo Trumpet in A | A_{4} | |
| Trumpet | F trumpet | F_{4} | |
| Trumpet | E trumpet | E_{4} | |
| Trumpet | E♭ trumpet | E♭_{4} | |
| Trumpet | D trumpet | D_{4} | |
| Trumpet | Trumpet | B♭_{3} | |
| Trumpet | A trumpet | A_{3} | |
| Trumpet | E♭ bass trumpet | E♭_{3} | |
| Trumpet | D bass trumpet | D_{3} | |
| Trumpet | Bass trumpet | B♭_{2} | |
| Tuba | E♭ tuba | E♭_{2} | When notated in treble clef |
| Tuba | B♭ tuba | B♭_{1} | When notated in treble clef |
| Venova | Venova | C_{5} | |
| Venova | Alto Venova | F_{4} | |
| Violin | Treble violin | C_{5} | |
| Violin | Alto Violin | C_{5} | |
| Violin | Octobass | C_{2} | |
| Violin | Octobass | C_{0} | |
| Viol | Double bass | C_{3} | |
| Wagner Tuba | Tenor Wagner tuba | B♭_{3}, formerly B♭_{2} | |
| Wagner Tuba | Bass Wagner tuba | F_{3}, formerly F_{2} | |
| Xylophone | | C_{5} | |

== See also ==
- Transposing instrument

== Notes ==
^a Only clarinet types currently in production or planned for production are listed. Additional obsolete or experimental transposing members of the clarinet family are listed at clarinet family.
