= Contrabass =

Instrument tuned in octaves lower than the standard instrument

Contrabass (from Italian: contrabbasso) refers to several musical instruments of very low pitch—generally one octave below bass register instruments. While the term most commonly refers to the double bass (which is the bass instrument in the orchestral string family, tuned lower than the cello), many other instruments in the contrabass register exist.

The term "contrabass" is relative, usually denoting a very low-pitched instrument of its type, rather than one in a particular range.

For example, the contrabass flute's lowest note is approximately an octave higher than that of the contrabass clarinet.

Instruments tuned below contrabass instruments, such as the double contrabass flute or subcontrabass saxophone, may be referred to as "double contrabass," "triple contrabass," "subcontrabass," or "octocontrabass" instruments.

On the other hand, the "contrabass" classification often includes such instruments.

== Wind ==
=== Brass ===
- Contrabass bugle, a variant tuba used in drum and bugle corps
- Contrabass hélicon
- Contrabass sackbut
- Contrabass serpent
- Contrabass saxhorn in EE♭
- Contrabass saxhorn in BB♭
- Subcontrabass saxhorn in EEE♭
- Subcontrabass saxhorn in BBB♭
- Contrabass trombone, in F or BB♭ below the bass trombone
- Contrabass trumpet
- Subcontrabass tuba in BBB♭

=== Woodwind ===
- Contrabass clarinet, two octaves below the B♭ soprano clarinet
- Octocontralto clarinet, two octaves below the alto clarinet
- Octocontrabass clarinet, three octaves below the B♭ soprano clarinet
- Contrabass flute, two octaves below the C concert flute
- Subcontrabass flute, two octaves below the alto flute
- Double contrabass flute, three octaves below the C concert flute
- Hyperbass flute, four octaves below the C concert flute
- Contrabass oboe, two octaves below the oboe
- Contrabass ocarina, one octave below the bass ocarina in C
- Great contrabass pommer
- Contrabass rackett
- Contrabass recorder, in F, two octaves below the alto/treble recorder
- Subcontrabass recorder, in C, three octaves below the soprano/descant recorder
- Sub-subcontrabass recorder, in F, three octaves below the alto/treble recorder
- Contrabass sarrusophone, range similar to the contrabass saxophone
- Contrabass saxophone, two octaves below the alto saxophone
- Subcontrabass saxophone, two octaves below the tenor saxophone
- Contrabass tin whistle
- Contrabass tubax, a saxophone-like instrument two octaves below the alto saxophone
- Subcontrabass tubax, two octaves below the tenor saxophone
- Contrabassoon, an octave below the bassoon
- Contraforte, a recently invented proprietary wide-bore variant of the contrabassoon with a more powerful tone and an upward pointing bell
- Reed contrabass
- Contrabassophone
- Slide reed subcontrabass

=== Other ===
- Contrabass harmonica
- Contrabass singer, basso profondo or oktavist, a rare sub-bass, classical singer who performs notes in the contrabass octave
- Organ with 16' or 32' registers.

== String ==
=== Bowed ===
- Double bass, a contrabass violin
- Violone, or contrabass viol
- Octobass
- Triple contrabass viol
- Dalaruan, used in the modern Chinese orchestra
- Dadihu, used in the modern Chinese orchestra

=== Plucked ===
- Acoustic bass guitar
- Bass guitar
- Contrabass guitar
- Subcontrabass guitar
- Contrabass balalaika, a large triangular lute used in traditional Russian folk music
- Guitarrón, a Mexican acoustic bass guitar used in mariachi ensembles
- Chitarrone moderno, a plucked bass type designed around 1900 by Italian luthiers for use in a mandolin orchestra
- Contrabass ukulele, typically marketed as the Kala U-Bass
