= Flute ensemble =

Genre of chamber music

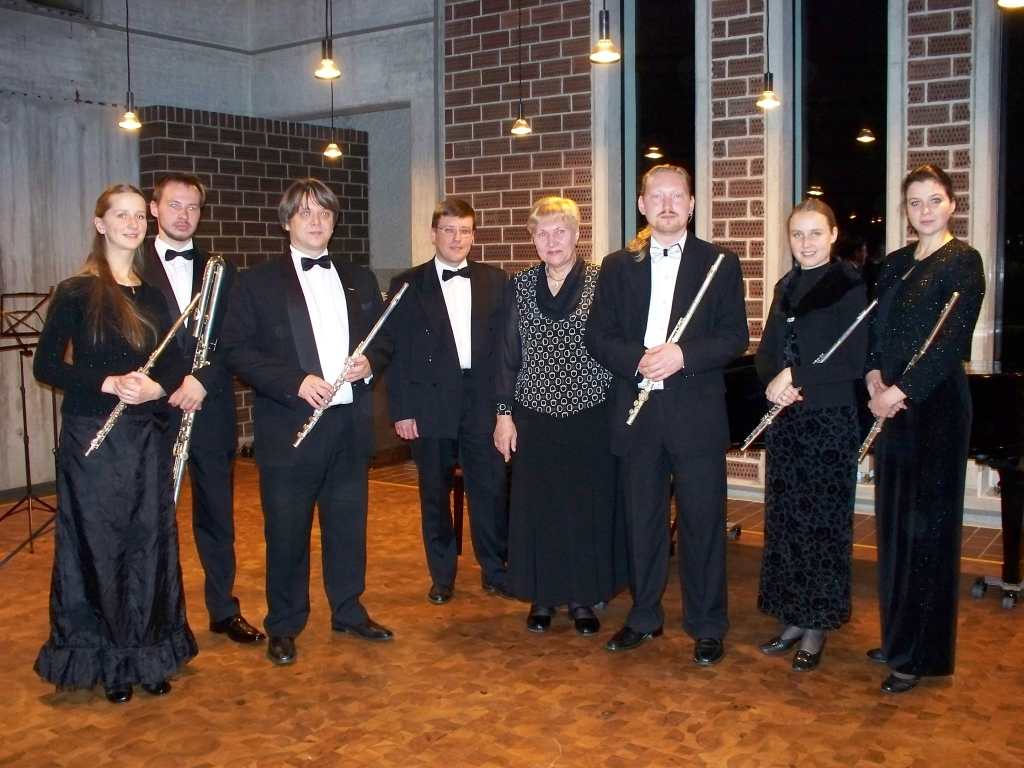
Flute ensemble Syrinx 2008 on German tour

A flute ensemble is an instrumental chamber ensemble consisting of members of the flute family.

== Flute quartet ==
In a more traditional sense, a flute quartet consists of a flute and a string trio (i.e., a violin, viola, and cello). This arrangement flourished in the eighteenth century, particularly through composers such as Wolfgang Amadeus Mozart, Carl Friedrich Abel, and Ferdinand Ries, among others. However, as of the twentieth century, a modern flute quartet typically refers to an arrangement of four flautists.

The flute quartet does not have any set arrangement, but common configurations include:

- Piccolo, Concert Flute, Alto Flute, Bass Flute
- Two Concert Flutes, Alto Flute, Bass Flute
- Four Concert Flutes

=== Notable works ===
==== For flute and string trio ====
- Wolfgang Amadeus Mozart:
  - No. 1 in D major (K. 285)
  - No. 2 in G major (K. 285a)
  - No. 3 in C major (K. Anh. 171/285b)
  - No. 4 in A major (K. 298)

== Flute choir ==
The modern definition of a flute choir is a recent development; likewise, the abundance of literature specifically written for the ensemble has grown alongside the ensemble itself. In the 1960s, flute choirs began to surface within colleges and communities. As there was very little music available for the instrumentation, directors of the individual groups arranged and composed music for the group. Over time, these groups learned of each other. The performers' love of the flute family eventually led to the formation of the National Flute Association. In turn, this led to an increase not only in music written for the flute and flute choir, but also to an increase in flute choirs. As the literature for the ensemble expanded, more flute choirs began to form.

=== Instrumentation ===
The following instruments, listed by descending range, can be included in a flute choir:

- Piccolo (in C, sounding an octave above the concert flute)
- Treble flute (in G, sounding a fifth above the concert flute)
- Soprano flute (in E♭, sounding a minor third above the concert flute)
- Concert Flute (in C)
- Alto flute (sounding a fourth below the concert flute)
- Bass flute (sounding an octave below the concert flute)
- Contra-alto flute (sounding an octave below the alto flute)
- Contrabass flute (sounding an octave below the bass flute and two octaves below the concert flute)
- Subcontrabass flute (very rare, often called the contrabass flute in G, sounding two octaves below the alto flute)
- Double contrabass flute (very rare, sounding one octave below the contrabass flute, two below the bass flute and three below the concert flute)

The flûte d'amour in B♭ or A is also occasionally seen in flute choirs. The G treble flute is used predominantly in the modern flute choirs of Scotland and Northern Ireland. The most common instrumentation for a "standard" flute choir can be seen in much of the literature:

- Piccolo
- 3–4 Concert Flute
- Alto Flute
- Bass Flute

By the mid-2010s, many of the well-established community and professional-level ensembles have acquired at least one contrabass flute.

As some groups do not have access to the larger flutes, some alterations are usually provided. Alto flute parts are usually accompanied by a transposed part for the concert flute (usually including certain octave changes because of the extended range of the alto). The sheer cost and limited availability of flutes lower than the bass flute usually prevent most community-based flute choirs from performing these works. However, many flute choirs use the lower voices of the string section ( such as the cello or double bass) to cover these lower parts.

== Repertoire ==
While most of the initial music arranged for flute choir included little more than transcriptions of classical pieces for orchestra and chamber ensembles, in recent years many new compositions have been created by such active composers as Ian Clarke, Sophie Lacaze, Phyllis Louke, Catherine McMichael, Ron Korb, and Judy Nishimura, Doina Rotaru, Didier Schein, among others. Although flute choirs are still a relatively new ensemble in the history of music, much of the established repertoire is available at many music stores worldwide, in addition to sites focused solely on the ensemble, such as ALRY Publications and Flute World.

== See also ==
- Flute concerto
