= Sub-bass flute =

Sub-bass flute may refer to:

- Contra-alto flute
- Contrabass flute
- Subcontrabass flute
