= Matthias Ziegler =

Swiss flautist and professor of flute (born 1955)

- Born: 13 February 1955 (age 71); Bern, Switzerland
- Genres: Contemporary, jazz, electronic music, classical
- Instruments: Flute, alto flute, bass flute, contrabass flute
- Formerly of: Zurich Chamber Orchestra

Matthias Ziegler (born in Bern, Switzerland on 13 February 1955) is a Swiss flautist and professor of flute who specializes in contemporary music for various sizes of flute (including flute, alto flute, bass flute, contrabass flute, and double contrabass flute).

== Early life and career ==
Ziegler started playing with recorder at the age of four and by the age of nine decided to practice playing a flute. Two years prior to it, his grandparents took him to a flute and organ concert, with the fascination with the flute arose from there. Ziegler plays Miguel Arista's Louis Lot, especially during collaboration with Bickford Brannen and Eva Kingma, who plays alto flute. His choice of this instrument came after long studying at Zurich Conservatory and eventually making his mind on Jack Moore's flute. In Conservatory he studied under various teachers and music pedagogues, including; William Bennett, Geoffrey Gilbert, André Jaunet, and Conrad Klemm.

Ziegler has toured with Andreas Vollenweider and George Gruntz, and performed with Pierre Favre and Mark Dresser. In a classical context, he was formerly the solo flautist for the Zurich Chamber Orchestra.

== Playing style ==
Ziegler's original works for flute instruments feature numerous extended techniques. In order to allow for the production of a buzzing timbre, he has installed small PET film membranes similar to the dimo used on the Chinese dizi on several of his instruments; he calls flutes so-equipped "Matusiflute". In addition, he plays quarter tone flutes.

Ziegler is also proficient with jazz and improvised music, and frequently performs in an electroacoustic setting. He amplifies his flutes with microphones installed directly into the instruments, and utilizes electronic loop devices (LOOP delay, Echoplex, Echoloop) to allow him to layer sounds. About his work, he states: " "All sounds (key noise, winds, tongue stops) usually neglected on the flute are amplified. There is a whole orchestra inside the flute, which allows me to play solo-polyphonic music."

Noting a similarity in tone between his large flutes and the viola da gamba, he also performs Renaissance music originally composed for viola.

Among Ziegler's instruments is a brass prototype of a bass flute with a low G foot, made by Eva Kingma; this instrument allows him to reach the low G of the contra-alto flute using special fingerings using the little fingers of the left and right hands, as well as the thumb of the right hand. The advantage of this instrument is that it is not a transposing instrument; it is tuned in C.

He lives in Stäfa, Canton of Zurich, Switzerland, and has toured the United States, Japan, Australia, South America, and Israel.

== Discography ==
- Uakti: New Music for Flute (1999) New Albion Records.
