= List of E-flat instruments =

The following is a list of E♭ instruments, or instruments for which the concert pitch of E♭ is notated as C in standard terminology. They are listed by the type of instrument, such as woodwind and brass.

== Woodwind instruments ==
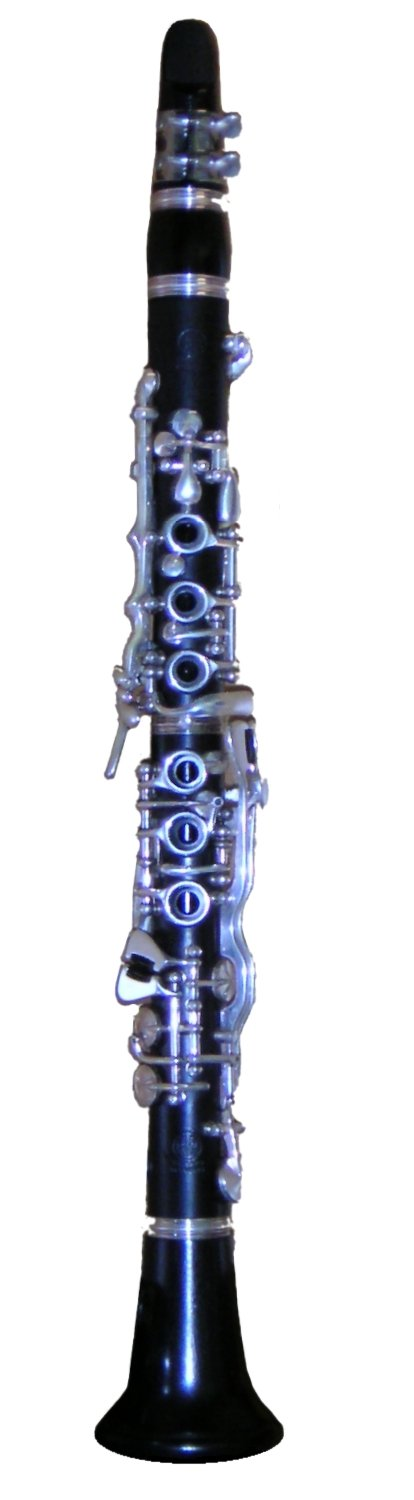
The E♭ Clarinet

- Sopranino saxophone
- Alto saxophone
- Baritone saxophone
- Contrabass saxophone
- Soprano flute
- E♭ clarinet
- Alto Clarinet
- Contra-alto Clarinet
- Octocontra-alto clarinet

== Brass instruments ==
- E♭ cornet, also known as a soprano cornet
- Tenor horn, known as an Alto Horn in the US
- Tuba in E-flat (written at concert pitch when using the bass clef, only transposing when written in treble clef)
- Circular altohorn (Koenig horn) pitched in E♭
- Tenor cornet
- Mellophone
- Alto trombone
- Vocal horn (cornet with an upward-facing bell)
- Duplex horn (Gemelli) pitched in E♭
- Tenor horn (with a forward-facing bell)
- Tenor ventil horn pitched in E♭ (an early horn that was one of the first to use valves)
- Over the shoulder bass horn pitched in E♭
- Solo Horn, an Alto Horn wrapped like a Cornet with forward facing bell

Cornets are occasionally known as coronets, although this may be a historical corruption of the word 'cornet'.

== Percussion and stringed instruments ==
- Clavichord pitched in E♭
- Mōsō biwa pitched in E♭

Ecossaise in E-flat
A piano solo by Ludwig van Beethoven played in the key of E♭ major.

== See also ==
- E-flat major
- E♭
