= Contra-alto =

Contra-alto, a musical term meaning low alto, may refer to:

- Contralto, a low female voice type
- Contra-alto clarinet, an instrument an octave lower than an alto clarinet
- Contra-alto flute, an instrument an octave lower than an alto flute
- Contra-alto saxophone, an instrument similar in size to the C melody saxophone
