= Roberto Fabbriciani =

Italian flautist

Roberto Fabbriciani (born 13 June 1949 in Arezzo) is an Italian flutist and composer, best known for having invented the hyperbass flute. Since 1976, he has appeared on the recordings of composers Luigi Nono, Claudio Abbado, Luciano Berio, Riccardo Chailly, and Peter Eötvös, among others and has played in the Spanish National Orchestra, the London Sinfonietta, and the orchestra of the Accademia Nazionale di Santa Cecilia.

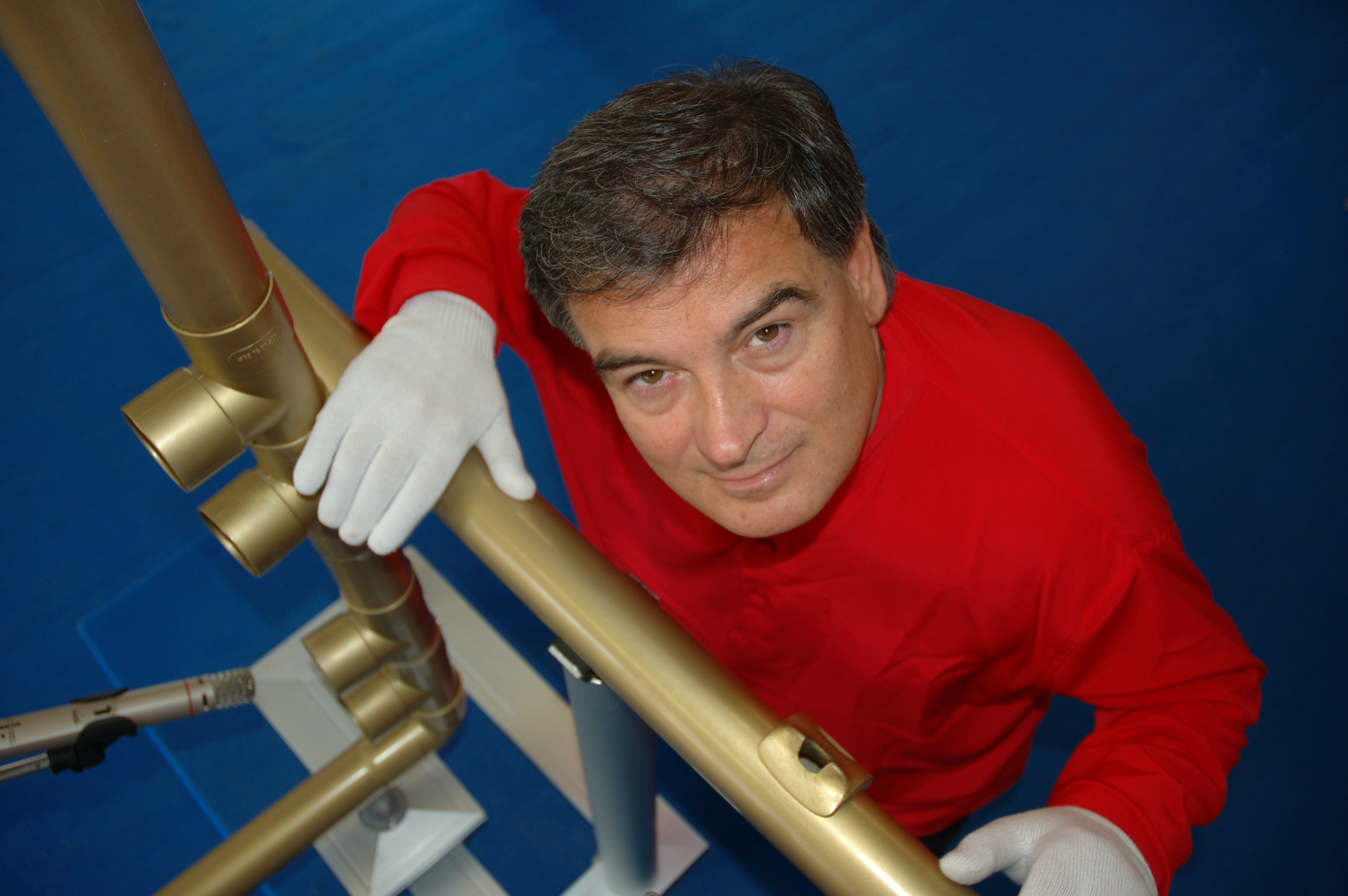
Roberto Fabbriciani with hyperbass flute
