= Venova =

Type of musical instrument of the woodwind family

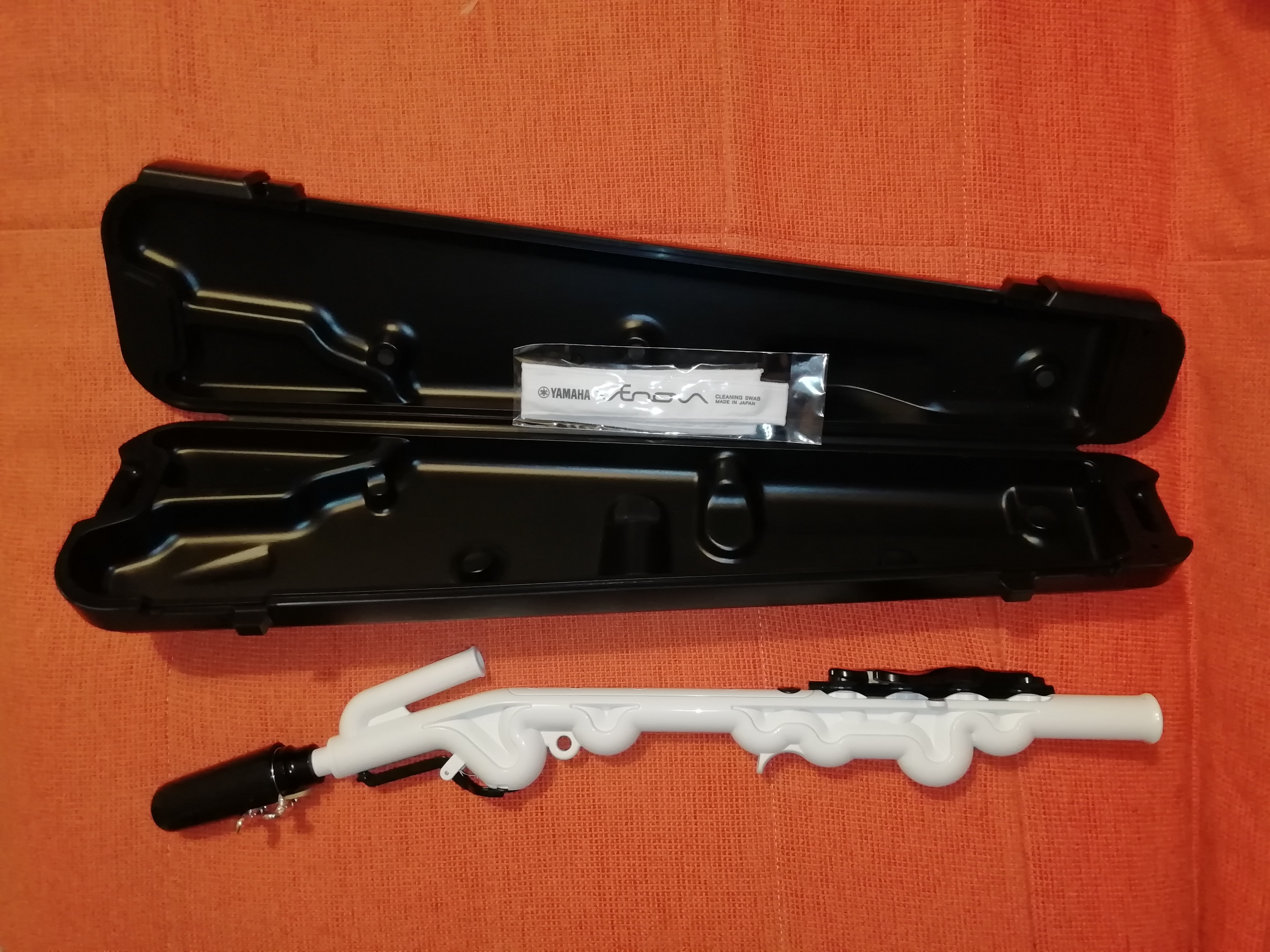
- Venova (YVS-100)

Related instruments
- Saxophone; Recorder

Builders
- Yamaha Corporation

The Venova is a single-reed musical instrument, currently produced by the Yamaha Corporation. The original (soprano) model, the YVS-100, was released in 2017, the alto model, the YVS-120, was released in 2019, and the tenor model, the YVS-140, was released in 2021. Yamaha markets the Venova as a "casual wind instrument".

The Venova features a predominantly cylindrical bore, but is distinguished by its branched-pipe structure near the mouthpiece of the instrument. This serves to approximate the acoustic qualities of an instrument with a conical bore, such as a saxophone. In particular, the Venova overblows at the octave, rather than the twelfth as does a conventional cylindrical reed instrument such as a chalumeau or clarinet.

The body of the Venova is composed almost entirely of ABS resin, and uses fingering systems derived from the baroque and German recorder conventions to chromatically span two octaves. The soprano Venova is a non transposing instrument in the key of C, the alto is a transposing instrument in F, and the tenor in C sounds an octave below written pitch. The Venova has a meandering, rather than straight, bore, making the instrument more compact and bringing the tone holes closer together within easier finger reach, a design idea that traces back to Nicola Papalini's early nineteenth century bass clarinet and the earlier rackett. Venovas use saxophone mouthpieces and reeds.

The Venova received the "Good Design Award", the highest award, at the 2017 Good Design Awards.

== See also ==
- Chalumeau
- Xaphoon
