= Gizmo key =

Feature of certain models of concert flutes

Parts of a flute. The gizmo key is illustrated in red.

The gizmo key is a key commonly found on the B foot joint of certain models of flute. It closes the low B tone hole without closing the low C tone hole or the low C♯ tone hole, which is intended to facilitate the performance of the fourth octave C.

The gizmo key was introduced by Verne Q. Powell (Powell Flutes), in response to criticisms of the B foot joint by performers such as Jean-Pierre Rampal, who believed that the lengthened tube made it harder for them to produce the highest notes. It is now common on the instrument.
