= Hyperbass flute =

Extremely low-pitched musical instrument in the flute family

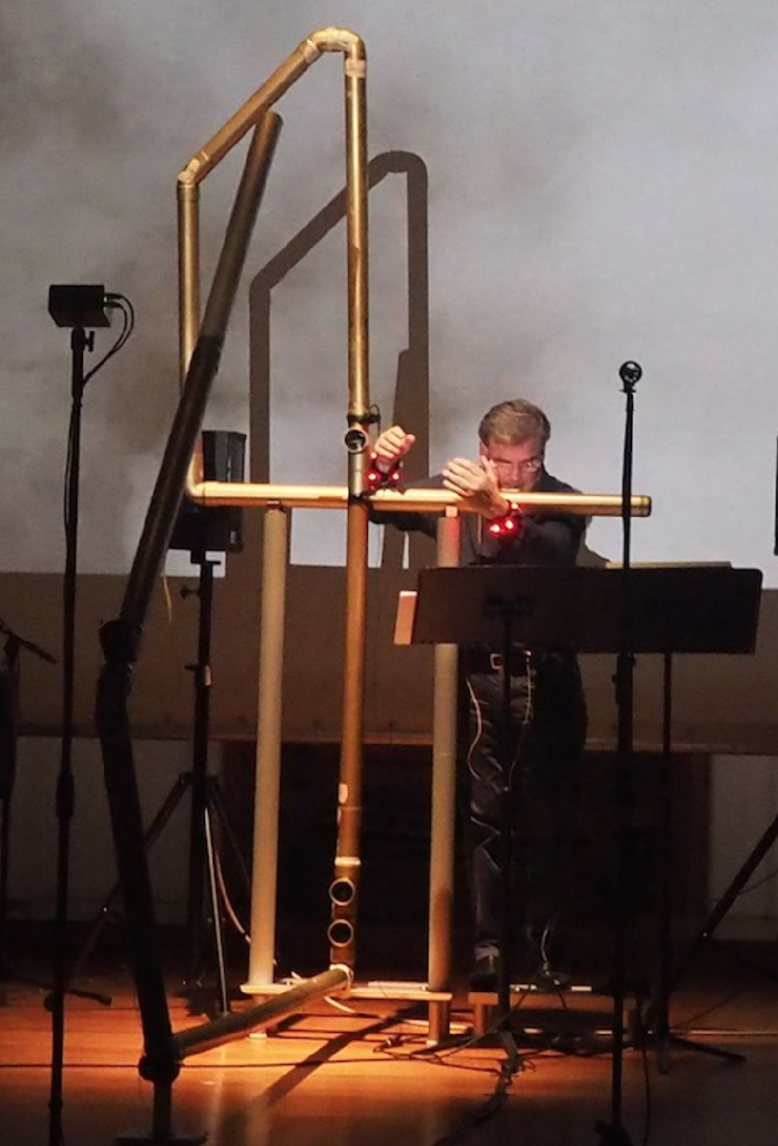
- Hyperbass flute played by Roberto Fabbriciani in Chemical Free (?) by Nicola Sani, 2014

Woodwind instrument
- Classification: Wind; Woodwind; Aerophone
- Hornbostel–Sachs classification: 421.121.12-71 (Side-blown Aerophone with tone holes and keys)

Playing range
- The lowest note of the hyperbass flute is C_{0}, below the lowest A on the concert piano.

Related instruments
- Flutes: Piccolo; Treble; Soprano; Flute; Flûte d'amour; Alto; Bass; Contra-alto; Contrabass; Subcontrabass; Double Contrabass; Hyperbass

The hyperbass flute is conceptually the largest and lowest-pitched instrument in the flute family, although it is extremely rare. It first appeared at the turn of the 21st century, and only two are known to exist. With tubing reaching over 8 metres (26 ft) in length, it is pitched in C, four octaves below the concert flute (three octaves below the bass, two below the contrabass, and one octave below the double contrabass). Its lowest note is C_{0}, one octave below the lowest C on a standard piano, which at 16 Hertz is considered below the threshold of human hearing. Humans hear from 20 to 20,000 Hz. Therefore, only the second and higher harmonics of the lowest notes are audible, but the entire range of the instrument can be heard.

The first playable example was built by Florentine craftsman Francesco Romei for Italian flutist Roberto Fabbriciani, inventor and first performer of the instrument. He called it the flauto iperbasso, or hyperbass flute. This first instrument was made from PVC and wood, with wide tone holes made from standard tee fittings, but without keys; these are covered with the palms of the hands. Low flute specialist Peter Sheridan commissioned the first fully chromatic hyperbass flute, from Dutch flute maker Jelle Hogenhuis in August 2010.

== Repertoire ==
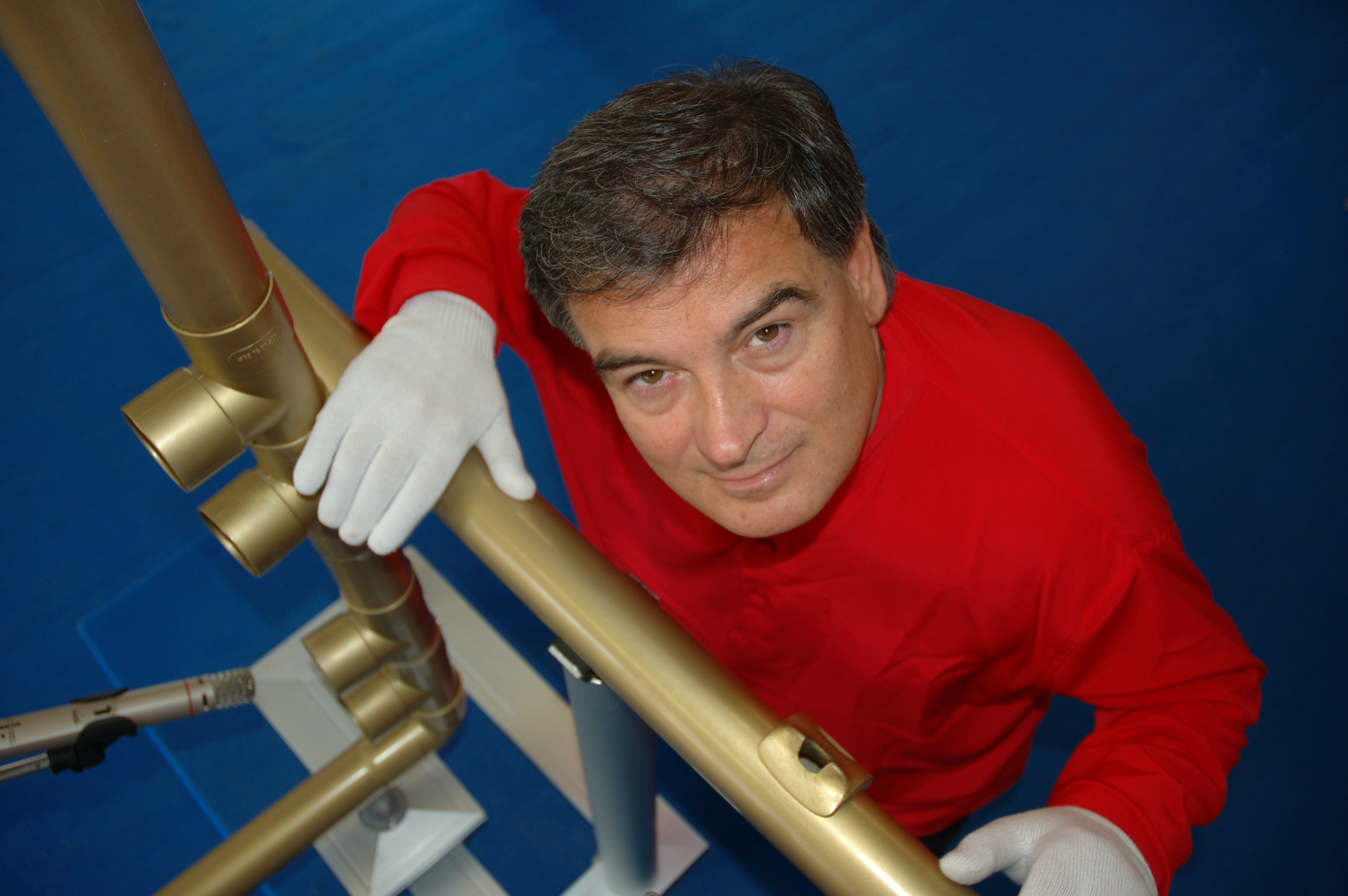
Roberto Fabbriciani with hyperbass flute

The first composition for the hyperbass flute with live electronics and magnetic tape is Persistenza della memoria by Alessandro Grego, published in 2001 by the ARTS label on the CD Flute XX vol.2. In 2002, Italian composer Nicola Sani composed Con Fuoco for hyperbass flute and 8-track magnetic tape, which Fabbriciani recorded at the electronic studio of the Westdeutscher Rundfunk (WDR) in Cologne, Germany. The track was released on a CD called Elements on the Stradivarius label.

In March 2005 Fabbriciani released an entire CD of music for hyperbass flute and tape, Glaciers in Extinction, on the Col Legno label.

In 2010, Fabbriciani released another hyperbass flute CD entitled Winds of the Heart, this time with tárogató player Esther Lamneck, on the Innova label. In 2013, Fabbriciani released another hyperbass flute CD entitled Alchemies, on the Brilliant label.

Peter Sheridan recorded Groaning Oceans for hyperbass flute and electronics by Dominy Clements in 2014, and played the hyperbass in Decodificando El Universo by Chilean composer Andrián Pertout in its première 2021 recording. He also performs and records on low flutes, including the hyperbass, in the Monash University Flute Ensemble.
