= Flûte d'amour =

Intermediate sized flute

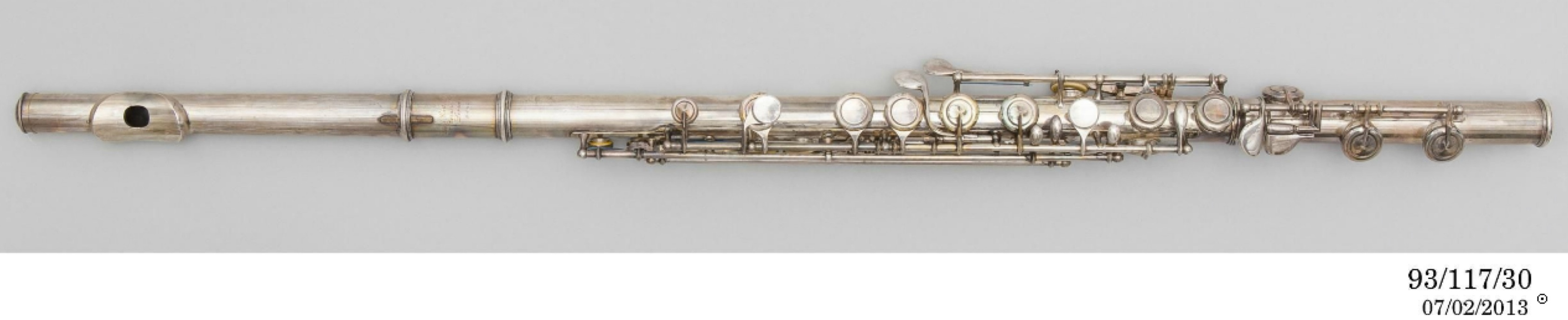
- Silver flûte d'amour (Radcliff system: alto flute in B-flat) used by John Amadio, made by Rudall Carte & Co. Ltd., London, England in 1923

Woodwind instrument
- Classification: Wind; Woodwind; Aerophone
- Hornbostel–Sachs classification: 421.121.12-71 (side-blown aerophone with tone holes and keys)

Playing range
- Tessitura of the flûte d'amour in A is A_{3}–A_{6}.

Related instruments
- Flutes: Piccolo; Treble; Soprano; C flute; Flûte d'amour; Alto; Bass; Contra-alto; Contrabass; Subcontrabass; Double Contrabass; Hyperbass

The flûte d'amour (/ˌfluːt dəˈmʊər/ FLOOT də-MOOR, French: [flyt damuʁ]; Italian: flauto d'amore; German: Liebesflöte; all translating as "love flute"), sometimes called a Mezzo-Soprano flute (French: flûte ténor; Italian: flauto tenore; German: Tenorflöte), is an uncommon member of the Western concert flute family, pitched in A♭, A, or B♭ and is intermediate in size between the modern C concert flute and the alto flute in G.

It is 100–205 mm (4–8 in) longer than the concert flute and plays either a major second, minor third, or major third below the standard C flute. A number of these instruments have survived. Apart from their length, they do not differ in any way from the concert flute; the bore diameter and embouchure are identical.

"When Verdi composed the opera Aida for performance in Cairo in 1871, he conceived the 'Sacred Egyptian Dance,' the finale of Act I, as being played by a group of three flûtes ď amour, and three such flutes were especially constructed in Milan. ... In present-day [1938] performances of this opera, the music for the flûtes ďamour is usually assigned to other instruments."

== Flûte d'amour repertoire ==
Composer	Work
Johann Sebastian Bach (1685–1750)	Various cantata movements Pastorale from Christmas Oratorio possibly Sonata in B minor.
Christoph Graupner (1683–1730)	Seven religious cantatas; two birthday cantatas; Triple concerto for flûte d'amour, oboe d’amore and viola d’amore; Solo flûte d'amour: Concerto in A. (Uses A d'amore)
Georg Philipp Telemann (1681–1767)	Concerto in A for flûte d'amour (A) and strings
Johann Melchior Molter (1696–1765)	Concerto for flûte d'amour (Ab) and strings
Johan Helmich Roman (1694–1767)	Second movement of E minor Sinfonia uses two flûtes d'amour.
Ignaz Holzbauer (1711–1783)	La Passione di Jesu Christo
Franz Anton Hoffmeister (1754–1812)	Notturno in E♭ for flute – flûte d'amour – (A♭) two horns in E♭ – two violas – cello or bassoon. Notturno in E♭ flûte d'amour – horn in E♭ and viola. (Trio)
Joseph Weigl (1766–1846)	Concerto in E♭ for cor anglais – flûte d'amour – (A♭) trumpet in E♭ – viola d'amore – Glockenspiel – euphonium – cembalo – and cello. With echo ensemble: cor anglais – flûte d'amour – (A♭) trumpet and cello.
Friedrich Hartmann Graf (1727–1795)	No title located
Antonio Messina-Rosaryo	Fantasia Diabolica (bass flute – flûte d'amour & flute/piano)
Giuseppe Richter (18th/19th century)	Quintet for 4 concert flutes and flûte d'amour (in A♭)
Johann Adolph Hasse (1699–1783)	Concerto in F for flûte d'amour (B♭) and strings.
Saverio Mercadante (1795–1870)	Trio for Flute – flûte d'amour and cello in F major. Fantasia Concertante for flute – flûte d'amour and orchestra
Stephen Dodgson (1924–2013)	O Swallow – flûte d'amour (A) and piano

Missing scores of known flûte d'amour compositions
Johann Morawetz: Eight nocturnes for flûte d'amour, 2 violins, 2 trumpets and cello.
Johann Neubauer: Two nocturnes for flute, flûte d'amour, 2 rns, 2 violins and cello
F. G. Reymann: 13 concerti for flute, flûte d'amour, 2 horns, 2 violas and cello.
