= Transposing instrument =

Musical instrument for which notated pitch differs from sounding pitch

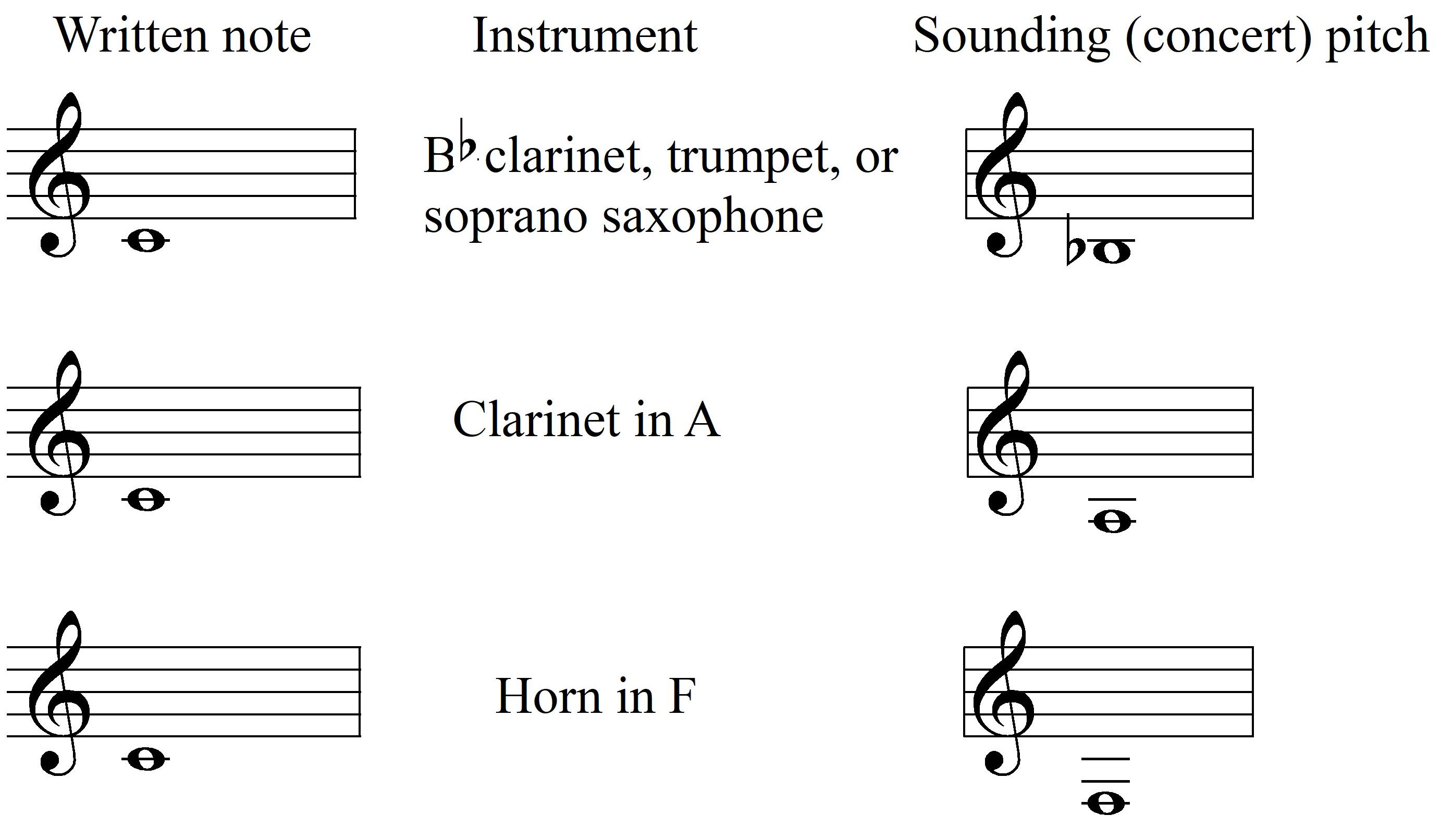

A transposing instrument is a musical instrument for which music notation is not written at concert pitch (concert pitch is the pitch on a non-transposing instrument such as the piano). For example, playing a written middle C on a transposing instrument produces a pitch other than middle C; that sounding pitch identifies the interval of transposition when describing the instrument. Playing a written C on clarinet or soprano saxophone produces a concert B♭ (i.e. B♭ at concert pitch), so these are referred to as B♭ instruments. Providing transposed music for these instruments is a convention of musical notation. The instruments do not transpose the music; rather, their music is written at a transposed pitch. Where chords are indicated for improvisation they are also written in the appropriate transposed form.

For some instruments, a written C sounds as a C but is in a different octave; these instruments are said to transpose "at the octave". Pitches on the double bass sound an octave lower than written, while those on the piccolo and celesta sound an octave higher, and those on the glockenspiel sound two octaves higher.

== Reasons for transposing ==
=== Ease of switching instruments ===
Some instruments are constructed in a variety of sizes, with the larger versions having a lower range than the smaller ones. Common examples are clarinets (the high E♭ clarinet, soprano instruments in C, B♭ and A, the alto in E♭, and the bass in B♭), flutes (the piccolo, transposing at the octave, the standard concert-pitch flute, and the alto flute in G), saxophones (in several octaves in B♭ and E♭), and trumpets (the common instrument in B♭, instruments in C, D and E♭, and the piccolo trumpet transposing at the octave). Music is often written in transposed form for these groups of instruments so that the fingerings correspond to the same written notes for any instrument in the family, even though the sounding pitches will differ. A musician who plays several instruments in a family can thus read music in the same way regardless of which particular instrument is being used.

Instruments that transpose this way are often said to be in a certain "key" (e.g., the "B♭ clarinet" or "clarinet in B♭"). This refers to the concert pitch that is heard when a written C is played on the instrument in question. Playing a written C produces a concert B♭ on a B♭ clarinet, a concert A on an A clarinet, and a concert C on a C clarinet (this last example is a non-transposing instrument).

=== Horn crooks ===
Before valves were invented in the 19th century, horns and trumpets could play only the notes of the overtone series from a single fundamental pitch. (Exceptions included slide-bearing versions such as the sackbut and finger-hole horns like the cornett and serpent.) Beginning in the early 18th century, a system of crooks was devised in Germany, enabling this fundamental to be changed by inserting one of a set of crooks between the mouthpiece and the lead pipe of the instrument, increasing the total length of its sounding tube. As a result, all horn music was written as if for a fundamental pitch of C, but the crooks could make a single instrument a transposing instrument into almost any key.

Changing these lead-pipe crooks was time-consuming, and even keeping them from falling out while playing was a matter of some concern to the player, so changing crooks could take place only during substantial rests. Medial crooks, inserted in the central portion of the instrument, were an improvement devised in the middle of the 18th century, and they could also be made to function as a slide for tuning, or to change the pitch of the fundamental by a semitone or tone. The introduction of valves made this process unnecessary, though many players and composers found the tone quality of valved instruments inferior (Richard Wagner sometimes wrote horn parts for both natural and valved horns together in the same piece). F transposition became standard in the early 19th century, with the horn sounding a perfect fifth below written pitch in treble clef. In bass clef, composers differed in whether they expected the instruments to transpose down a fifth or up a fourth.

=== Reconciling pitch standards ===
In Germany during the Baroque period, instruments used for different purposes were often tuned to different pitch standards, called Chorton ("choir pitch") and Kammerton ("chamber [music] pitch"). When playing together in an ensemble, the music of some instruments would therefore be transposed to compensate. In many of Bach's cantatas, the organ part is notated a full step lower than the other instruments. See pitch inflation.

Some present day early-music ensembles combine instruments tuned to A415 with instruments tuned to A440. Since these pitches are approximately a semitone apart, the music for one set of instruments may be transposed to match the pitch of the others. Modern builders of continuo instruments sometimes include moveable keyboards which can play with either pitch standard. Some harpsichords are made with a mechanism that shifts the keyboard action right or left, causing each key to play the adjacent string. If A4 is tuned at A415, that key can then play either the A♯ at 440 Hz or the A♭ at 392 Hz. The top or bottom key on the instrument will not produce sound unless the builder has added extra strings to accommodate this transposition.

== Transposition at the octave ==
Some instruments have ranges that do not fit on the staff well when using one of the common clefs. In order to avoid the use of excessive ledger lines, music for these instruments may be written one, or even two, octaves away from concert pitch, using treble or bass clef. These instruments are said to "transpose at the octave"—their music is not written in a different key from concert pitch instruments, but sound one or two octaves higher or lower than written.

Double bass, bass guitar, guitar, and contrabassoon sound an octave lower than written. Piccolo, xylophone, celesta, and some recorders (sopranino, soprano, bass and sometimes alto) sound an octave above the written note. Glockenspiel, garklein recorder, and crotales sound two octaves above the written note.

Most authorities include this type of notation in the definition of "transposing instruments", although it is a special case in the sense that these instruments remain in the same key as non-transposing instruments.

== Mechanical and physical considerations ==
Many woodwind instruments have one major scale whose execution involves lifting the fingers more or less sequentially from bottom to top. On flute and saxophone, and in the second register of the clarinet, this scale is notated as a C scale. This is not the case for oboe (where this scale is D) or bassoon (where it is F). The note written as C sounds as the note of the instrument's transposition: on an E♭ alto saxophone, that note sounds as a concert E♭, while on an A clarinet, that note sounds as a concert A.

Brass instruments, when played with no valves engaged (or, for trombones, with the slide all the way in), play a series of notes that form the overtone series based on some fundamental pitch, e.g., the B♭ trumpet, when played with no valves engaged, can play the overtones based on B♭. Usually, that pitch is the note that indicates the transposition of the instrument. Trombones are an exception: while tenor and bass trombones are pitched in B♭, and the alto trombone is in E♭, they read at concert pitch. This convention is not followed in British Brass Band music, where the tenor trombone is treated as a transposing instrument in B♭. French horn is treated as a transposing instrument in F even though many horns have two (or even three) different sets of tubing in different keys (the common double horn has tubing in F and B♭).

In general, for these instruments there is some reason to consider a certain pitch the "home" note of an instrument, and that pitch is usually written as C for that instrument. The concert pitch of that note is what determines how we refer to the transposition of that instrument.

== Conductor's score ==
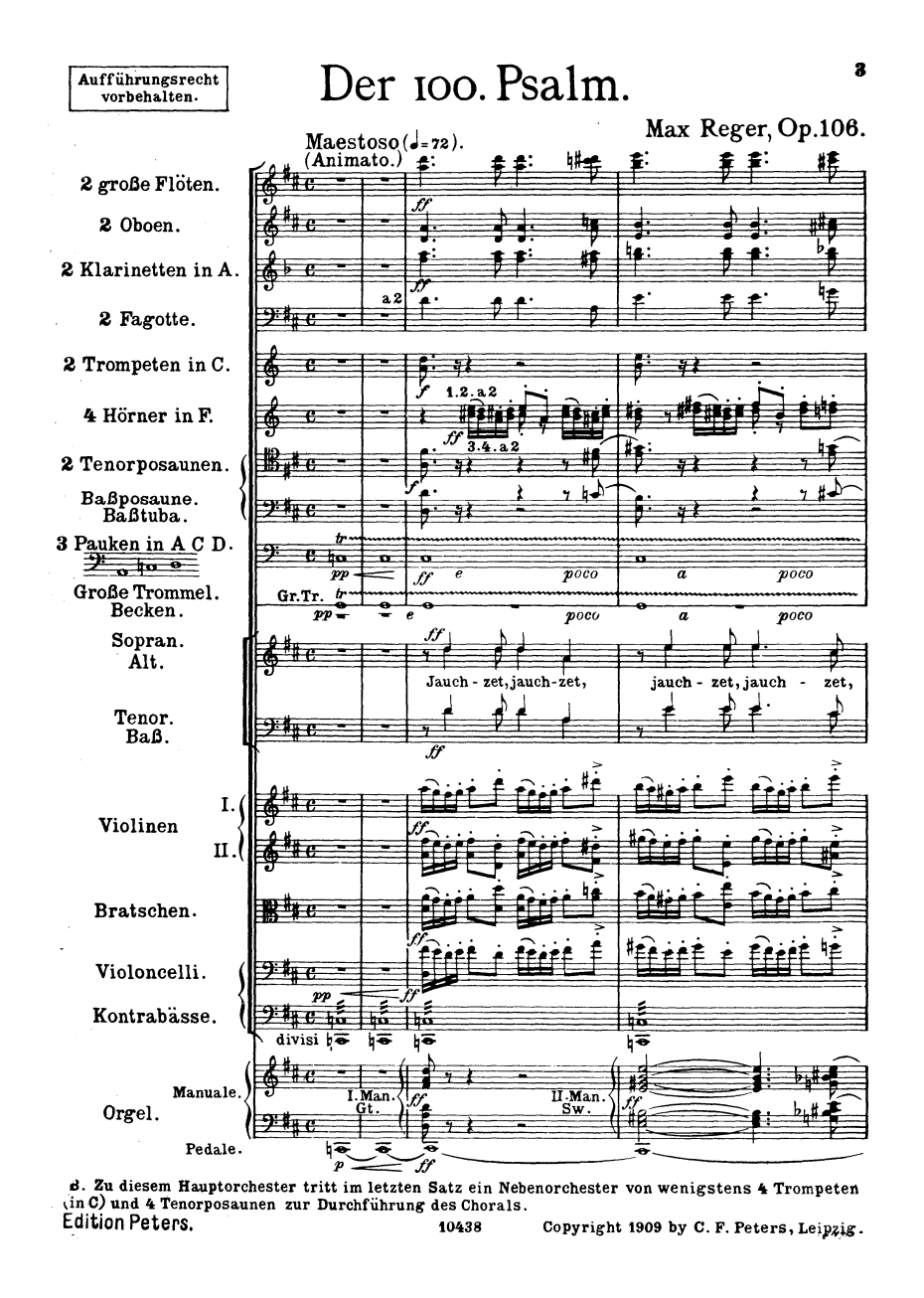
Sheet music of the full score for Max Reger's Der 100. Psalm for choir, orchestra and organ. Staves for voices and for most concert-pitch instruments show a key signature of D major. Clarinets (2 Klarinetten in A) are shown with the appropriate transposition. French horns (4 Hörner in F) are shown transposed, but without a key signature, while trumpets (2 Trompeten in C) and timpani (3 Pauken in A C D) are written at concert pitch without key signatures.

In full scores, music for transposing instruments is generally written in transposed form, just as in the players' parts. Since the beginning of the 20th century, some composers have written orchestral scores entirely in concert pitch, e.g. the score of Sergei Prokofiev's Piano Concerto No. 1 in D♭.

== See also ==
- List of transposing instruments

== Sources ==
- Kennan, Kent Wheeler (1970) [1952]. The Technique of Orchestration (second ed.). Englewood Cliffs, New Jersey: Prentice-Hall. ISBN 0-13-900316-9.
- Del Mar, Norman (1981). The Anatomy of the Orchestra. University of California Press. ISBN 0-520-04500-9.
