= Treble flute =

Musical Instrument

Treble Flute
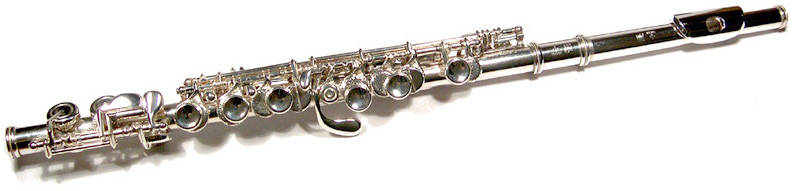
- Myall-Allen G treble flute
- Classification: Woodwind (Aerophone)

Related instruments
- Flute; Alto flute; Bass flute; Treble flute; Soprano flute; Flûte d'amour; Contra-alto flute; Contrabass flute; Subcontrabass flute; Double contrabass flute; Hyperbass flute

The treble flute is a member of the flute family. It is in the key of G, pitched a fifth above the concert flute and is a transposing instrument, sounding a fifth higher than the written note. The instrument is rare today, only occasionally found in flute choirs, some marching bands or private collections. Some 19th-century operas, such as Ivanhoe, include the instrument in their orchestrations.

A limited number of manufacturers produce G treble flutes, including Myall-Allen and Flutemakers Guild. The flutes have many of the same options as their larger C flute cousins, including sterling silver bodies, trill keys, and soldered keys. It is very similar to a piccolo, and plays in the same range, although, because it is slightly larger, it has a different quality at the upper end of its register, and it has an extended lower register, as compared with the piccolo. The instrument should not be confused with the alto flute, also in G, which is a larger instrument that transposes down a fourth to the octave below the treble flute.

Since the demise of the Renaissance flute consorts, this treble flute in G seems to have all but disappeared. Only the flute bands of Northern Ireland and Scotland that have converted from the traditional "simple system" flutes to Boehm system silver flutes make extensive use of the treble flutes in G. Current instrumentation of one of these ensembles typically would be: Solo piccolo in C, Solo treble flute in G, 1st, 2nd and 3rd treble flutes in G, Solo flute in C, 1st and 2nd flutes in C, 1st and 2nd alto flutes in G, bass flutes in C, (and contrabass flutes in C), 4 percussion.
