= Subcontrabass flute =

Subcontrabass member of the Western concert flute family

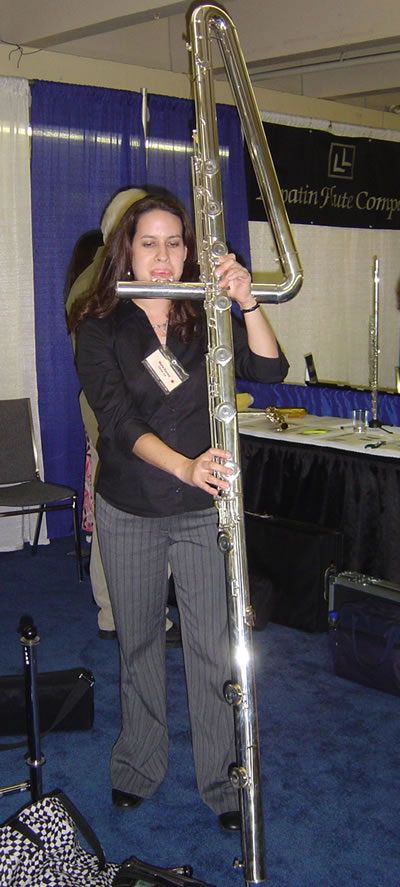
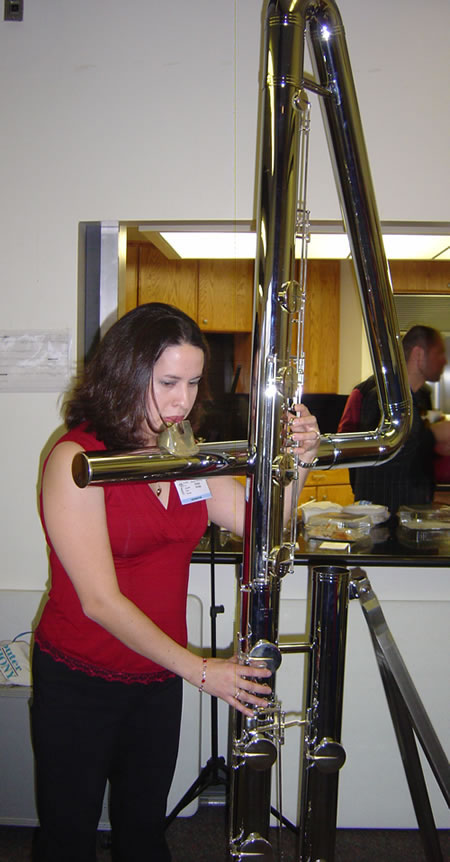
- Maria Ramey playing an Eva Kingma subcontrabass flute in G Maria Ramey playing a double contrabass flute

Woodwind instrument
- Classification: Transverse flute
- Hornbostel–Sachs classification: 421.121.12-71 (Side-blown Aerophone with tone holes and keys)

Playing range
- The G subcontrabass flute, notated in treble clef, sounds two octaves and a fourth below written; the tessitura is G_{1}–G_{3}. The C double contrabass flute, notated in treble clef, sounds three octaves below written; the tessitura is C_{1}–C_{3}.

Related instruments
- Flutes: Piccolo; Treble; Soprano; C flute; Flûte d'amour; Alto; Bass; Contra-alto; Contrabass; Subcontrabass; Hyperbass

Musicians
- Peter Sheridan; Matthias Ziegler

Builders
- Eva Kingma; Kotato and Fukushima

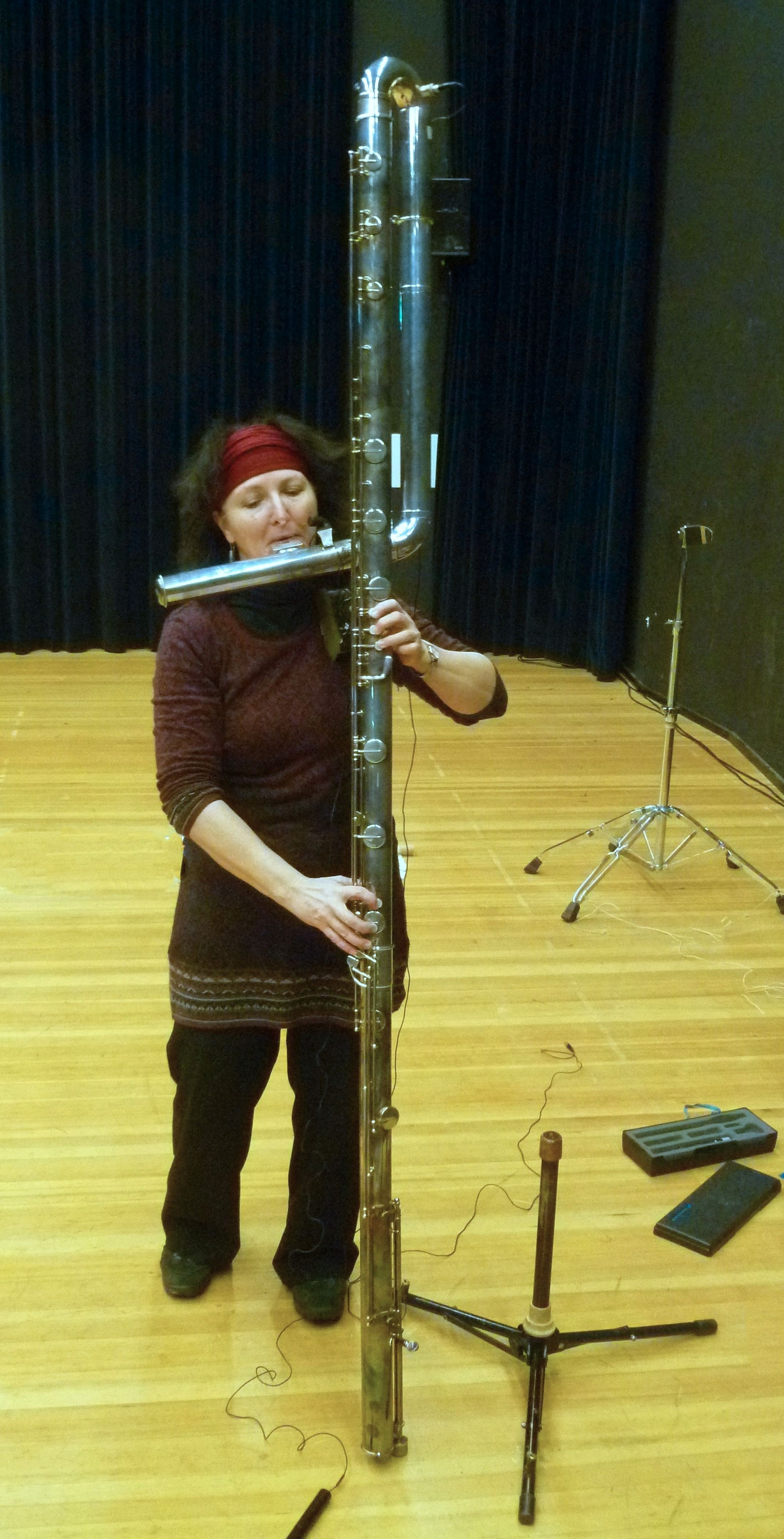
A subcontrabass flute in G.

The subcontrabass flutes are members of the Western concert flute family. Built in two sizes, the instrument in G or F, also known as the double contra-alto flute, has 4.6 to 4.9 metres (15 to 16 ft) of tubing, while the larger instrument in C, also known as the double contrabass flute or octobass flute, has tubing 5.5 metres (18 ft) long, and is the second largest instrument of the family after the hyperbass flute.

The subcontrabass flute in G is pitched a fourth below the contrabass flute in C, and two octaves below the alto flute; it is sometimes built a whole tone lower in F. The subcontrabass flute in C is a full octave below the contrabass flute, hence its "double contrabass" name. Its lowest note is C_{1}, the lowest C on the piano.

The subcontrabass flutes are mainly used as the lower voices in large flute choirs, although they are occasionally also used in film scores. Their projection is limited without amplification, especially in larger ensembles. At present, they are only available as a custom order from specialty makers Eva Kingma (based in the Netherlands) or Kotato & Fukushima (based in Japan). Higher quality instruments are made of silver- or chrome-plated metal, usually brass. Dutch maker Jelle Hogenhuis built subcontrabass flutes in metal, and offered a version built using polypropylene plastic tubing, which was cheaper and half the weight.

Eva Kingma sells her double contrabass flutes for US$41,367, and Kotato & Fukushima sell their double contrabass flutes for US$48,500. Kingma introduced her newly developed double contrabass flute at the National Flute Association's 2023 convention in Phoenix, Arizona (August 3-6, 2023); this instrument weighs 10.5 kg (23 lbs.) in total (including its tripod stand).

== Compositions ==
- "And the Giant Began to Dance..." (2009) from the album Below: Music for Low Flutes by Peter Sheridan
