= Western concert flute =

Transverse woodwind instrument

Flute
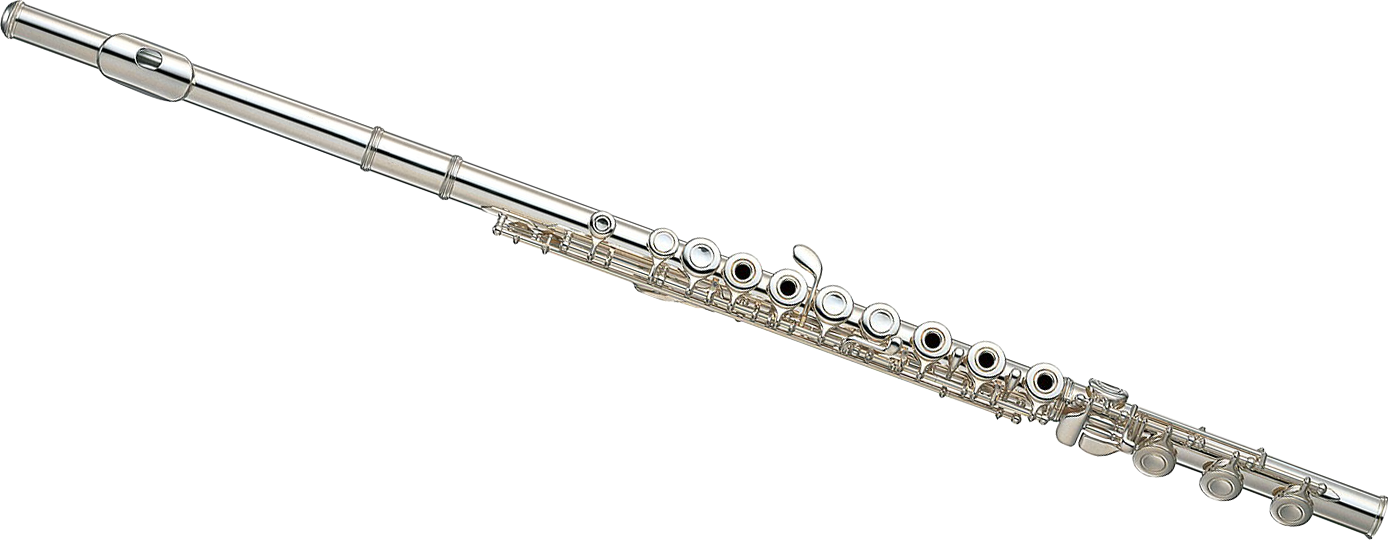

Woodwind instrument
- Other names: Transverse flute; Boehm flute; C flute
- Classification: Edge-blown aerophone
- Hornbostel–Sachs classification: 421.121.12 (open side-blown flute with fingerholes)

Playing range
- The range of the standard C concert flute is C_{4} to C_{7}, although higher notes are possible. Some professional models may have a key for low B_{3}.

Related instruments
- Flute family: Piccolo; Treble; Soprano; C flute; Flûte d'amour; Alto; Bass; Contra-alto; Contrabass; Subcontrabass; Double Contrabass; Hyperbass

The Western concert flute can refer to the common C concert flute or to the family of transverse (side-blown) flutes to which the C flute belongs. Almost all are made of metal or wood, or a combination of the two. A musician who plays the flute is often called a "flautist" in British English and a "flutist" in American English.

This type of flute is used in many ensembles, including concert bands, military bands, marching bands, orchestras, flute ensembles, and occasionally jazz combos and big bands. Other flutes in this family include the piccolo, the alto flute, and the bass flute. A large repertory of works has been composed for flute.

== Predecessors ==
The flute is one of the oldest and most widely used wind instruments. The precursors of the modern concert flute were keyless wooden transverse flutes similar to modern fifes. These were later modified to include up to eight keys for chromatic notes.

Partita for solo flute (BWV 1013) by Johann Sebastian Bach performed on an 18th-century traverso by Alex Murray
1. Allemande

2. Courante

3. Sarabande

4. Bourrée

Six-holed flutes pitched in D are the most common keyless wooden transverse flutes. They are used in Irish traditional music and historically informed performances of early music, including Baroque music. During the Baroque era the traditional transverse flute was redesigned and eventually developed into the modern traverso.

=== Medieval flutes (1000–1400) ===
Throughout the 11th, 12th, and 13th centuries, the recorder was prominent in Europe while transverse flutes were very uncommon. The transverse flute arrived in Europe from Asia via the Byzantine Empire, whence it migrated to Germany and France. These became known as "German flutes" to distinguish them from others, such as the recorder. The flute began to be used in court music, along with the viol, and was used in secular music in France and Germany. It would not spread to the rest of Europe for nearly a century. The first literary appearance of the transverse flute was made in 1285 by Adenet le Roi in a list of instruments he played. After this, a period of 70 years follows in which few references to the flute are found.

=== Renaissance to 17th century ===
Beginning in the 1470s, the use of the flute in military contexts (the Swiss army used flutes for signalling, for example) led to its spread through Europe. In the late 16th century, flutes began to appear in court and theatre music (in predecessors of the modern orchestra), and the first flute solos were seen.

After this flutes began appearing in chamber ensembles, often as the tenor voice, although flutes varied greatly in size and range. This made transposition necessary, which led flautists to use Guidonian hexachords (used by singers and other musicians since their introduction in the 11th century) to transpose music more easily.

During the 16th and early 17th centuries in Europe, the transverse flute was made in several sizes, in effect forming a consort, similarly to how recorders and other instruments were used. The transverse flute was usually made in one section (or two for the larger sizes) and had a cylindrical bore. As a result, this flute had a rather soft sound and was used primarily in the "soft consort".

=== Traverso ===
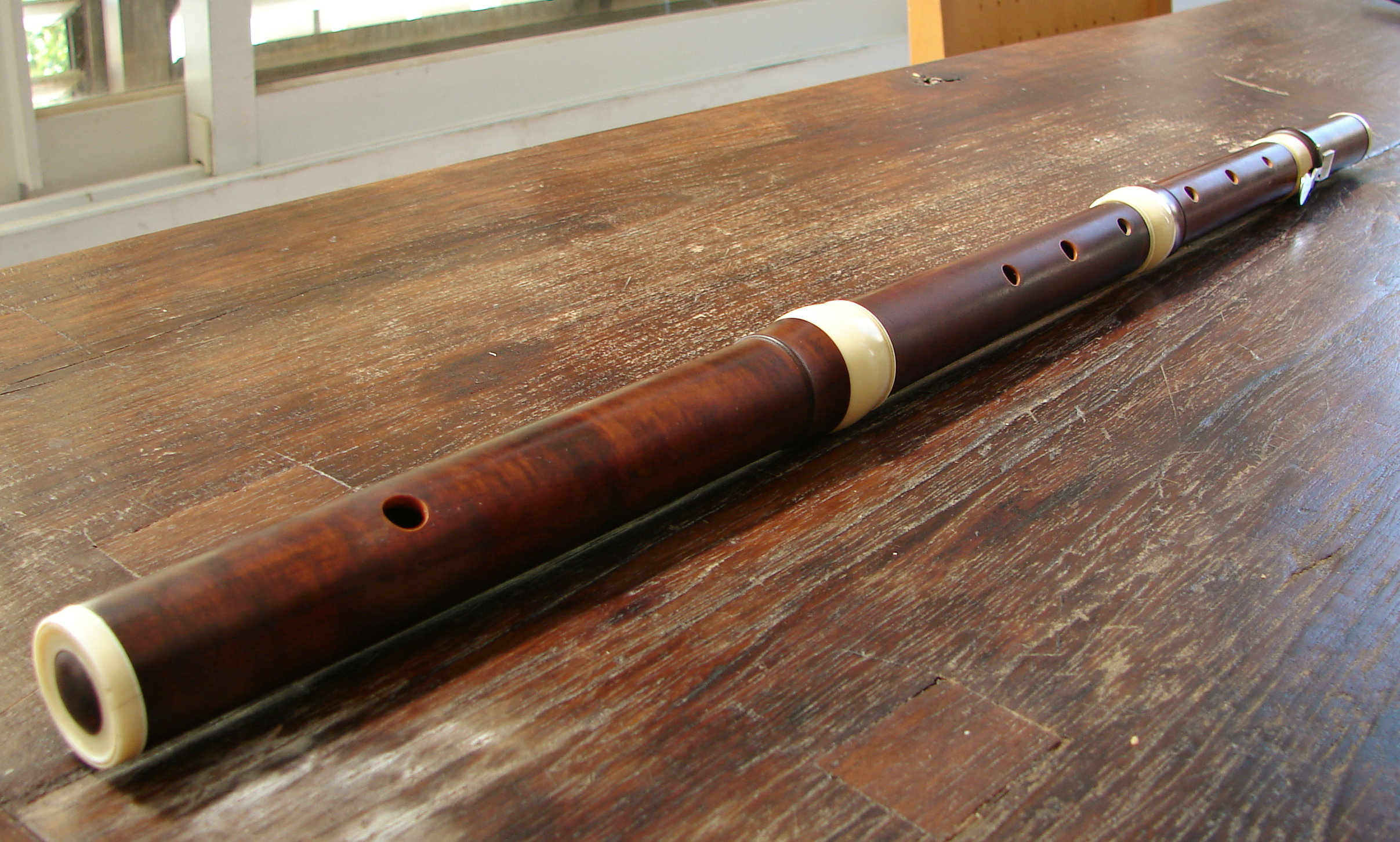
A modern copy of an 18th-century French traverso, by flute-maker Boaz Berney

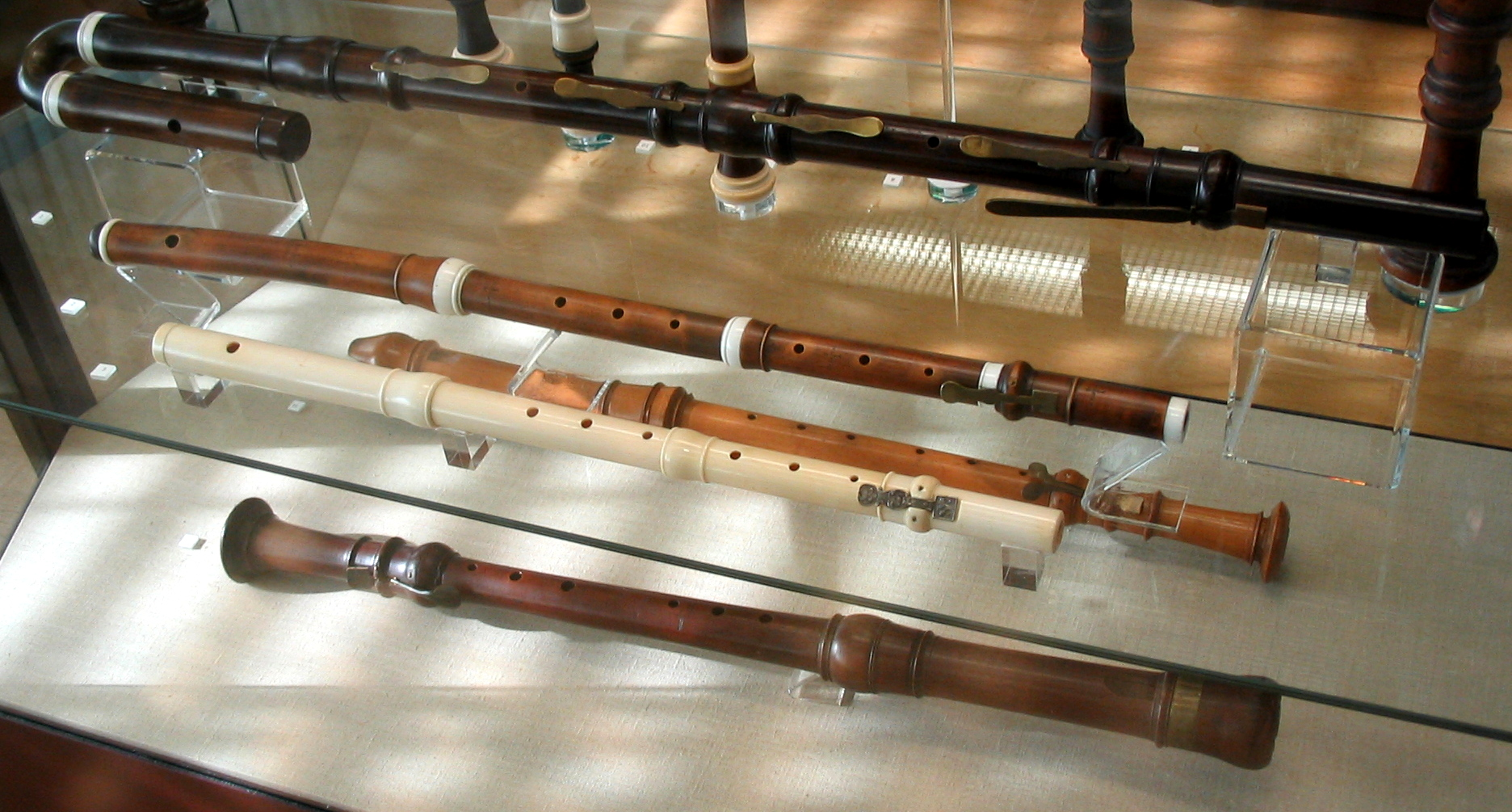
Various Baroque flutes and recorders in the Berlin Musical Instrument Museum

During the Baroque period, the transverse flute was redesigned. Now often called the traverso (from the Italian), it was made in three or four sections or joints (the head, upper-body, lower-body and foot joint) and made with a conical bore from the head joint down. The conical bore gave the flute a wider range and more penetrating sound without sacrificing its softer, expressive qualities. The head joint of the traverso contains one embouchure hole across which air is blown, and the two body pieces (upper and lower) each contain three equally sized finger holes. There is one key on the baroque flute. It is on the foot joint and was usually made out of metal. The traverso was made with a variety of materials including wood (most often boxwood), ivory, and metal. While very few flutes remain from the Renaissance and Medieval eras, many Baroque flutes have been preserved.

While the flute was mostly used in ensembles and group performances during the Renaissance and Medieval eras, Baroque era composers began to write more music for the flute in operas, ballets, and chamber music. The traverso also began to take on the role of soloist. The first written work for the solo traverso was a piece written by Michael de la Barre entitled “Pièces pour la flute traversiere avec la basse-continue” in 1702. Other notable baroque flute composers include Praetorius, Schütz, Rebillé, Quantz, J.S Bach, Telemann, Blavet, Vivaldi, Hotteterre, Handel and Frederick the Great. Several books studying the Baroque flute were published during this time. In 1707, Jacques Martin Hotteterre wrote the first method book on playing the flute: Principes de la flûte traversière. The 1730s saw an increase in the use of the flute in opera and chamber music, and Quantz published his Essay of a Method of Playing the Transverse Flute near the end of this era.

The Baroque flute requires less airflow than the modern flute and produces much softer, mellower sounds, often blending in with other instruments in the orchestra. The baroque flute also requires the player to adjust the intonation more than modern flutes. Additional adjustments are needed when playing notes outside of the D major scale. The flutist can change pitch through small adjustments in the mouth and by turning the flute towards or away from the player.

Flutes began to lose favor in the early Romantic era as symphony orchestras tended to feature brass and strings. The 21st century has seen a rise in the popularity of the Baroque flute, by flutist Barthold Kuijken and others such as Frans Bruggen, Emi Ferguson, and Peter Holtslag.

== Development ==
A 1911 illustration of a Western Classical Flute

Partita for solo flute (BWV 1013) by Johann Sebastian Bach performed on a modern flute by Scott Goff
1. Allemande

2. Courante

3. Sarabande

4. Bourrée

=== Boehm flute ===
In the nineteenth century, the great flautist, composer, acoustician, and silversmith Theobald Boehm began to make flutes. Keys were added to the flute, and the taper was changed to strengthen its lower register. The dimensions and key system of the modern western concert flute and its close relatives are strongly influenced by Boehm's design, which he patented in 1847. Minor additions to and variations on his key system are common, but the acoustical structure of the tube remains almost exactly as he designed it. Major innovations were the change from wood to metal, a large straight bore, a "parabolic" tapered headjoint bore, very large tone holes covered by keys, and the linked key system, which simplified fingering. The most substantial departures from Boehm's original description are the universal elimination of the "crutch" for the left hand and almost universal adoption of Briccialdi's thumb key mechanism and a closed-standing G♯ key over an additional G♯ tone hole. Boehm's key system, with minor variations, remains regarded as the most effective system of any modern woodwind, allowing trained instrumentalists to perform with facility in all keys. The modern flute has three octaves plus C_{7}–C♯_{7}–D_{7} in the fourth octave. Many modern composers used the high D♯_{7}. While such extremes are not common, the modern flute can produce even higher notes.

=== 19th-century variants ===
Meyer and Giorgi flutes

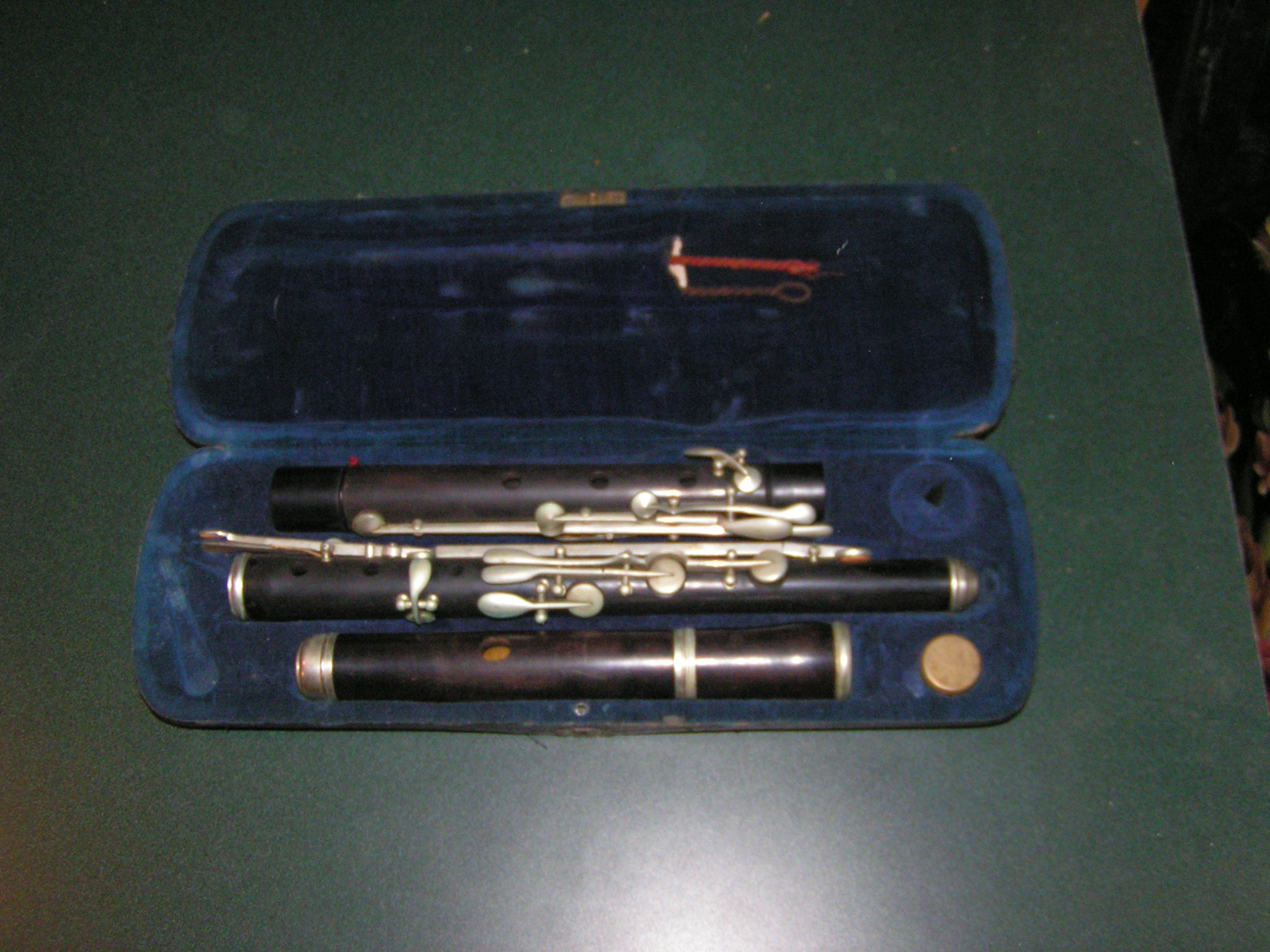
An early keyed H.F. Meyer all-wood construction flute in case

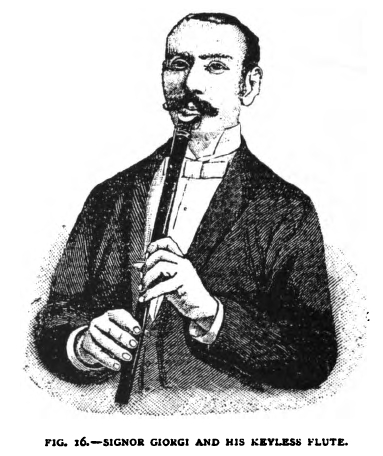
Carlo Tommaso Giorgi and his Giorgi flute. The flute was end-blown.

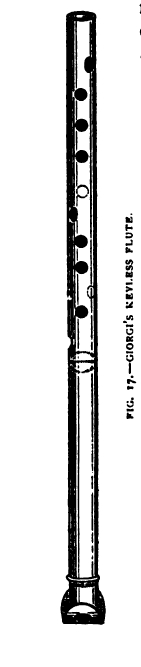
Giorgi flute

The Meyer flute was a popular flute in the mid 19th century. Including and derived from the instruments built by H.F. Meyer from 1850 to the late 1890s, it could have up to 12 keys and was built with head joints of either metal-lined ivory or wood. The final form was a combination of a traditional keyed flute and the Viennese flute, and became the most common throughout Europe and America. This form had 12 keys, a body of wood, a head joint of metal and ivory, and was common at the end of the century.

Quite at the opposite end of the spectrum, in terms of the complexity of the key system developed by Boehm, was the Giorgi flute, an advanced form of the ancient holed flute. Patented in 1897, the Giorgi flute was designed without any mechanical keys, though the patent allows for the addition of keys as options. Giorgi enabled the performer to play equally true in all musical keys, as does the Boehm system. Giorgi flutes are now rarities, found in museums and private collections. The underlying principles of both flute patterns are virtually identical, with tone holes spaced as required to produce a fully chromatic scale. The player, by opening and closing holes, adjusts the effective length of the tube, and thus the rate of oscillation, which defines the audible pitch.

=== Modified Boehm flute ===
In the 1950s, Albert Cooper modified the Boehm flute to make playing modern music easier. The flute was tuned to A440, and the embouchure hole was cut in a new way to change the timbre. These flutes became the most used flutes by professionals and amateurs.

In the 1980s, Johan Brögger modified the Boehm flute by fixing two major problems that had existed for nearly 150 years: maladjustment between certain keys and problems between the G and B♭ keys. The result was non-rotating shafts, which gave a quieter sound and less friction on moving parts. Also, the modifications allowed for springs to be adjusted individually, and the flute was strengthened. The Brögger flute is only made by the Brannen Brothers and Miyazawa Flutes.

== Characteristics ==
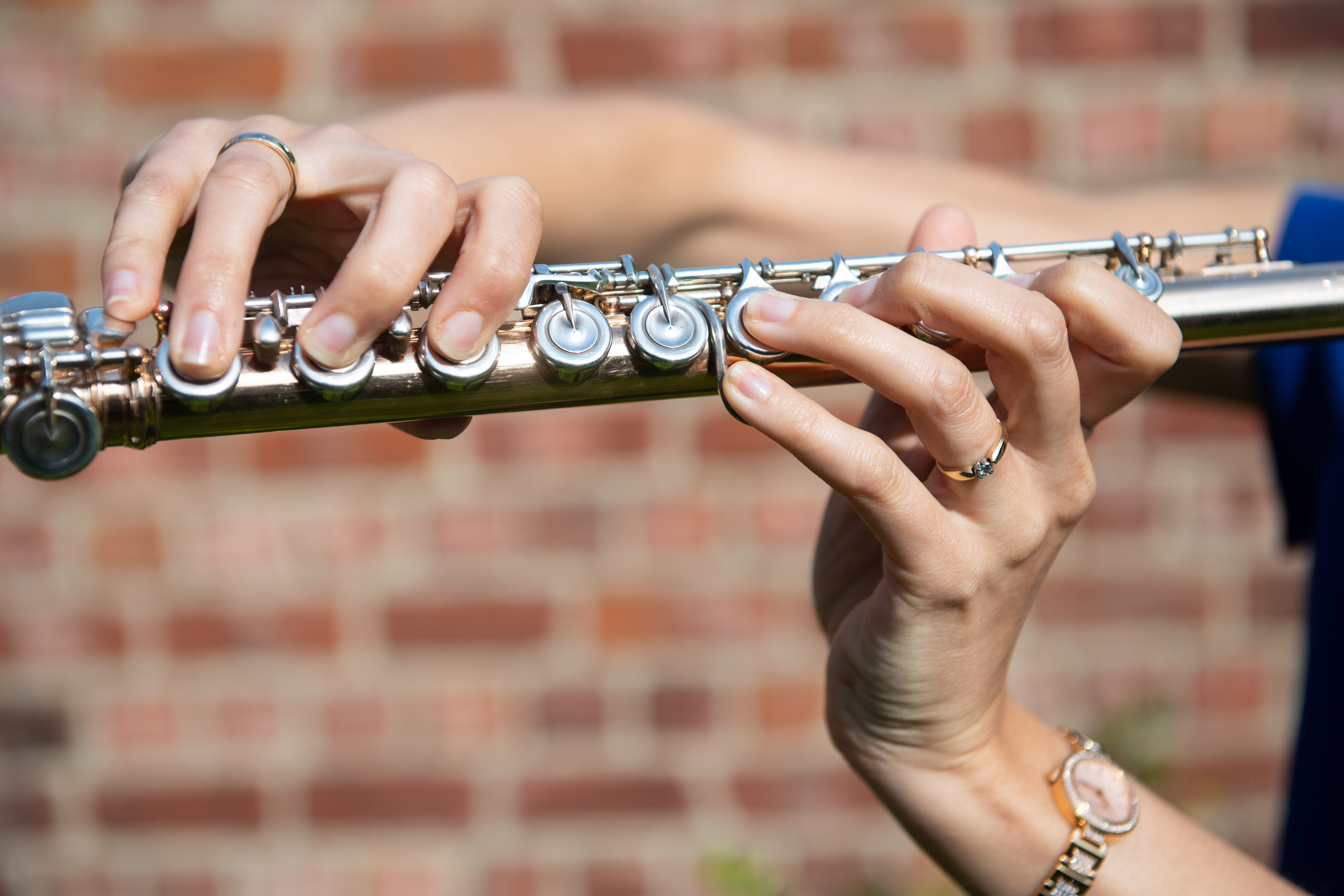
A flautist playing a Western concert flute

The flute is a transverse (or side-blown) woodwind instrument that is closed at the blown end. It is played by blowing a stream of air over the embouchure hole. The pitch is changed by opening or closing keys that cover circular tone holes (there are typically 16 tone holes). Opening and closing the holes produces higher and lower pitches. Higher pitches can also be achieved through over-blowing, like most other woodwind instruments. The direction and intensity of the airstream also affects the pitch, timbre, and dynamics.

The piccolo is also commonly used in Western orchestras and bands. Alto flutes, pitched a fourth below the standard flute, and bass flutes, an octave below, are also used occasionally.

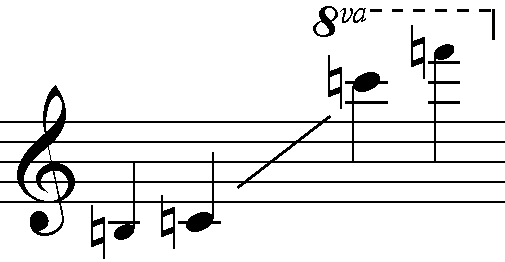
(B_{3}) C_{4}–C_{7} (F_{7})

(B_{3}) C_{4}–C_{7} (F♯_{7})

The standard concert flute, also called C flute, Boehm flute, silver flute, or simply flute, is pitched in C and has a potential range of three and a half octaves starting from the note C_{4} (middle C). The flute's highest pitch is usually given as C_{7} or (in more modern flute literature) D_{7}. More experienced flautists are able to reach up to F♯_{7}, but notes above D_{7} are difficult to produce. Modern flutes may have a longer foot joint, a B-footjoint, with an extra key to reach B_{3}.

From high to low, the members of the concert flute family include the following:

- Piccolo in C or D♭
- Treble flute in G
- Soprano flute in E♭
- Concert flute in C, described above
- Flûte d'amour (also called tenor flute) in B♭, A, or A♭
- Alto flute in G
- Bass flute in C
- Contra-alto flute in G
- Contrabass flute in C (also called octobass flute)
- Subcontrabass flute in G (also called double contra-alto flute) or C (also called double contrabass flute)
- Double contrabass flute in C (also called octocontrabass flute or subcontrabass flute)
- Hyperbass flute in C

Each of the above instruments has its own range. The piccolo reads music in C (like the standard flute), but sounds one octave higher. The alto flute is in the key of G, and the low register extends to the G below middle C; its highest note is a high G (4 ledger lines above the treble staff). The bass flute is an octave lower than the concert flute, and the contrabass flute is an octave lower than the bass flute.

Less commonly seen flutes include the treble flute in G, pitched one octave higher than the alto flute; soprano flute, between the treble and concert; and tenor flute or flûte d'amour in B♭, A or A♭ pitched between the concert and alto.

Flutes pitched lower than the bass flute were developed in the 20th century. These include the contra-alto flute (pitched in G, one octave below the alto), the subcontrabass flute (pitched in G, two octaves below the alto), and the double contrabass flute (pitched in C, one octave below the contrabass). The flute sizes other than the concert flute and piccolo are sometimes called harmony flutes.

=== Construction and materials ===
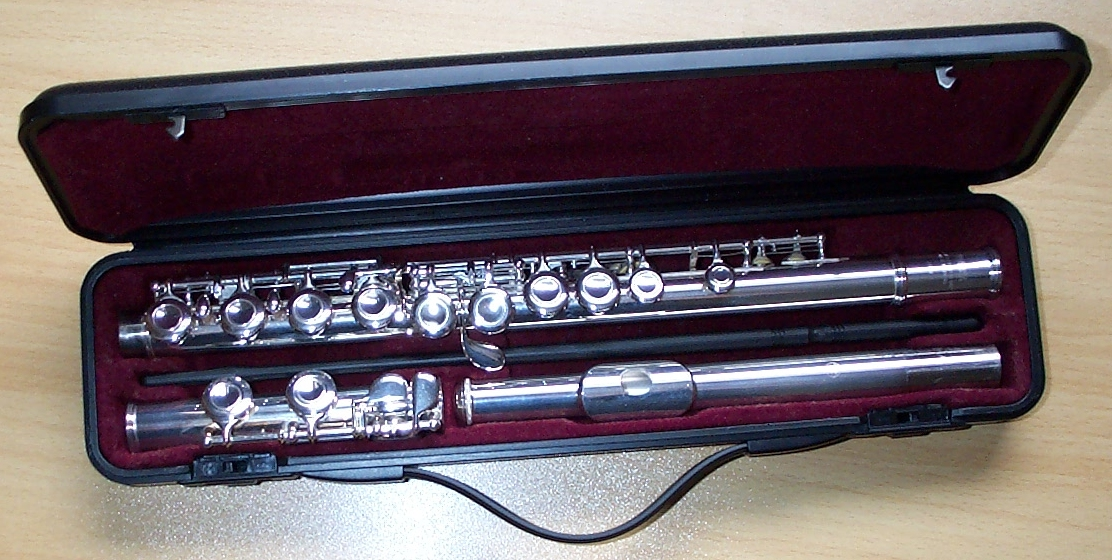
A closed hole beginner Yamaha FL211 flute in case

Concert flutes have three parts: the headjoint, body, and foot joint. The headjoint is sealed by a cork (or plug that may be made out of various plastics, metals, or less commonly woods). It is possible to make fine adjustments to tuning by adjusting the headjoint cork, but usually it is left in the factory-recommended position around 17.3 mm (0.68 in) from the centre of the embouchure hole for best scale. Gross, temporary adjustments of pitch are made by moving the headjoint in and out of the headjoint tenon. The flautist makes fine or rapid adjustments of pitch and timbre by adjusting the embouchure and/or position of the flute in relation to himself or herself, i.e., side and out.

Labelled parts of a French model (open-hole) flute with a B-foot joint.

- Crown – the cap at the end of the head joint that unscrews to expose the cork and helps keep the head joint cork positioned at the proper depth.
- Lip plate – the part of the head joint that contacts the player's lower lip, allowing positioning and direction of the air stream.
- Riser – the metal section that raises the lip plate from the head joint tube.
- Head joint – the top section of the flute, it has the tone hole/lip plate where the player initiates the sound by blowing air across the opening.
- Body – the middle section of the flute with the majority of the keys.
- Closed-hole – a fully covered finger key.
- Open-hole – a finger key with a perforated center.
- Pointed arms – arms connecting the keys to the rods, which are pointed and extend to the keys' centers. These are found on more expensive flutes.
- French model – a flute with pointed French-style arms and open-hole keys, as distinguished from the plateau style with closed holes.
- Inline G – the standard position of the left-hand G (third-finger) key – in line with the first and second keys.
- Offset G – a G key extended to the side of the other two left-hand finger keys (along with the G♯ key), making it easier to reach and cover effectively.
- Split E mechanism – a system whereby the second G key (positioned below the G♯ key) is closed when the right middle-finger key is depressed, enabling a clearer third octave E; omitted from many intermediate- and professional flutes, as it can reduce the tonal quality of the third-octave F♯ (F♯_{6}).
- Trill keys – two small teardrop shaped keys between the right-hand keys on the body; the first enables an easy C–D trill, and the second enables C–D♯. A–B♭ lever or "trill" key is located in line directly above the right first-finger key. An optional C♯ trill key that facilitates the trill from B to C♯ is sometimes found on intermediate- and professional flutes. The two trill keys are also used in playing the high B♭ and B.
- Foot joint – the last section of the flute (played farthest towards the right).
- C foot – a foot joint with a lowest note of middle C (C_{4}); typical on student flutes.
- B foot – a foot joint with a lowest note of B below middle C (B_{3}), which is an option for intermediate and professional flutes.
- D♯ roller – an optional feature added to the E♭ key on the foot joint, facilitating the transition between E♭/D♯ and D♭/C♯, and C.
- "Gizmo key" – an optional key on the B foot joint that helps play C_{7}.

==== Head joint shape ====
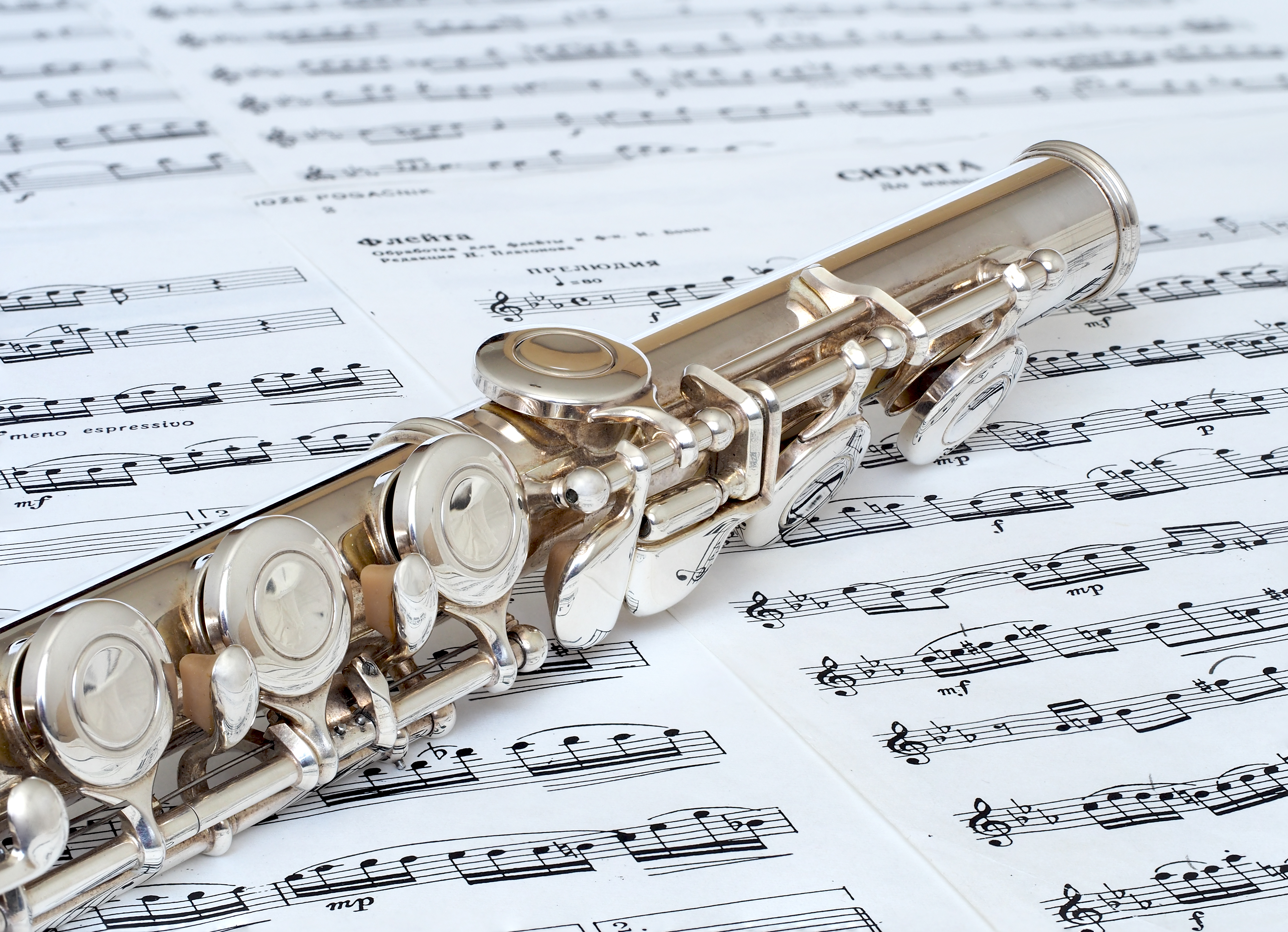
Close-up of part of the body and the C-foot joint. The instrument features plateau keys with Y-arms, trill keys, and soldered tone holes. The image depicts the D-key adjustment screw, and needle springs.

The head-joint tube is tapered slightly towards the closed end. Theobald Boehm described the shape of the taper as parabolic. Examination of his flutes did not reveal a true parabolic curve, but the taper is more complex than a truncated cone. The head joint is the most difficult part to construct because the lip plate and tone hole have critical dimensions, edges, and angles that vary slightly between manufacturers and in individual flutes, especially where they are handmade.

Head joint geometry appears particularly critical to acoustic performance and tone, but there is no clear consensus on a particular shape amongst manufacturers. Acoustic impedance of the embouchure hole appears to be the most critical parameter. Critical variables affecting this acoustic impedance include: chimney length (the hole between lip-plate and head tube), chimney diameter, and radiuses or curvature of the ends of the chimney. Generally, the shorter the hole, the more quickly a flute can be played; the longer the hole, the more complex the tone. Finding a particularly good example of a flute is dependent on play-testing. Head joint upgrades are usually suggested as a way to improve the tone of an instrument.

Cheaper student models may be purchased with a curved head to allow younger children with shorter arms to play them.

==== Tubing materials ====
Less expensive flutes are usually constructed of brass, polished and then silver-plated and lacquered to prevent corrosion, or silver-plated nickel silver (nickel-bronze bell metal, 63% Cu, 29% Zn, 5.5% Ni, 1.25% Ag, .75% Pb, alloyed As, Sb, Fe, Sn). Flutes that are more expensive are usually made of more precious metals, most commonly solid sterling silver (92.5% silver), and other alloys including French silver (95% silver, 5% copper), "coin silver" (90% silver), or Britannia silver (95.8% silver). It is reported that old Louis Lot French flutes have a particular sound by nature of their specific silver alloy. Gold/silver flutes are even more expensive. They can be either gold on the inside and silver on the outside, or vice versa. All-gold and all-platinum flutes also exist. Flutes can also be made out of wood, with African blackwood (grenadilla or Dalbergia melanoxylon) being the most common today. Cocuswood was formerly used, but this is hard to obtain today. Wooden flutes were far more common before the early 20th century. The silver flute was introduced by Boehm in 1847, but did not become common until later in the 20th century. William S. Haynes, a flute manufacturer in Boston, Massachusetts, United States, told Georges Barrère that in 1905 he made one silver flute to every 100 wooden flutes, but in the 1930s, he made one wooden flute to every 100 silver flutes.

Unusual tubing materials include glass, carbon fiber, and palladium.

Opinions on how different materials affect sound quality vary widely. Flute maker Verne Q. Powell stated that "As far as tone is concerned, I contend that 90 percent of it is the man behind the flute".

Most metal flutes are made of alloys that contain significant amounts of copper or silver. These alloys are biostatic because of the oligodynamic effect and thus suppress growth of unpleasant molds, fungi, and bacteria.

Good quality flutes are designed to prevent or reduce galvanic corrosion between the tube and key mechanism.

==== Pad materials ====
Tone holes are stopped by pads constructed of "fish skin" (goldbeater's skin) over felt, or sometimes silicone rubber on some low-cost or "ruggedized" flutes. Accurate shimming of pads on professional flutes to ensure pad sealing is very time consuming. In the traditional method, pads are seated on paper shims sealed with shellac. A recent development is "precision" pads fitted by a factory-trained technician. Student flutes are more likely to have pads bedded in thicker materials like wax or hot-melt glue. Larger-sized closed-hole pads are also held in with screws and washers.

==== Keywork ====
The keys can be made of the same or different metals as the tubing, nickel silver keys with silver tubing, for example. Flute key axles (or "steels") are typically made of drill rod or stainless steel. These mechanisms need periodic disassembly, cleaning, and relubrication, typically performed by a trained technician, for optimal performance. James Phelan, a flute maker and engineer, recommends single-weight motor oil (SAE 20 or 30) as a key lubricant demonstrating superior performance and reduced wear, in preference to commercial key oils).

The keywork is constructed by lost-wax castings and machining, with mounting posts and ribs silver-soldered to the tube. On the best flutes, the castings are forged to increase their strength.

Most keys have needle springs made of phosphor bronze, stainless steel, beryllium copper, or a gold alloy. The B thumb keys typically have flat springs. Phosphor bronze is by far the most common material for needle springs because it is relatively inexpensive, makes a good spring, and is resistant to corrosion. Unfortunately, it is prone to metal fatigue. Stainless steel also makes a good spring and is resistant to corrosion. Gold springs are found mostly in high-end flutes because of gold's cost.

=== Mechanical options ===
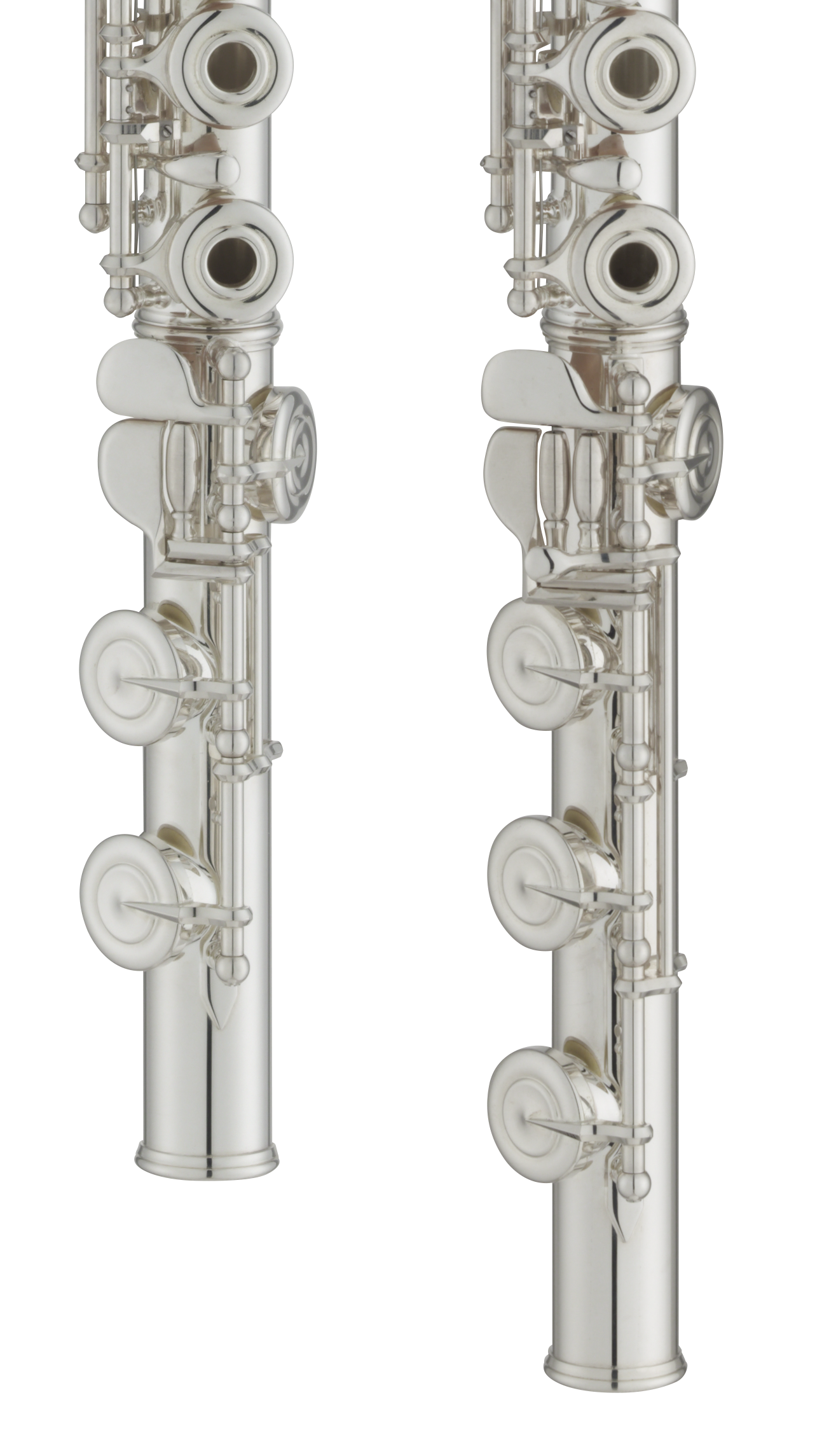
Comparison of a C foot and a B foot (right)

B♭ thumb key
The B♭ thumb key (invented and pioneered by Briccialdi) is considered standard today.
Open hole keys versus plateau keys
Open-hole "French model" flutes have circular holes in the centers of five of the keys. These holes are covered by the fingertips when the keys are depressed. Open-hole flutes are frequently chosen by concert-level flautists, although this preference is less prevalent in Germany, Italy, and Eastern Europe. Students may use temporary plugs to cover the holes until they can reliably cover the holes with the fingertips. Some flautists claim that open-hole keys permit louder and clearer sound projection in the lower register. Open-hole keys are needed for ethnic styles such as traditional Celtic music, and for some modern concert pieces that require harmonic overtones or "breathy" sounds. They can also facilitate alternate fingerings, extended techniques such as quarter-tones, glissandi, and multiphonics. Closed holes (plateau keys) permit a more relaxed hand position for some flautists.
Offset G versus in-line G keys
All of Boehm's original models had offset G keys, which are mechanically simpler, and permit a more relaxed hand position, especially for flautists with small hands. Some players prefer the hand position of the in-line G. For many years there was a misperception that inline G was for "professional" flutes while offset G was for "student" models, but this stereotype has been largely debunked.
Split E
The split E modification makes the third octave E (E_{6}) easier to play for some flautists. A less expensive option is the "low G insert".
B foot
The B foot extends the range of the flute down one semitone to B_{3} (the B below middle C).
Gizmo key
Some flutes with a B foot have a "gizmo key": a device that allows closure of the B tone hole independently of the C and C♯ keys. The gizmo key makes C_{7} easier to play.
Trill keys
The three standard trill keys permit rapid alternation between two notes with disparate standard fingerings: lowest, middle, and highest trill keys ease C–D♯, C–D, and B♭–A, respectively. Some higher notes (third-octave B and B♭ and most fourth-octave notes) also require use of the two lower trill keys. A fourth so-called C♯ trill key is an increasingly popular option available on many flutes. It is named after one of its uses, to ease the B to C♯ trill, but it also allows some trills and tremolos that are otherwise very difficult, such as high G to high A. Another way of trilling G_{6}–A_{6} is a dedicated high G–A trill key.
D♯ roller
Some models offer a D♯ roller option, or even an optional pair of parallel rollers on the D♯ and C♯ keys, that ease motion of the right little finger on, for example, low C to D♯.
Soldered tone holes
Tone-holes may be either drawn (by pulling the tube material outwards) or soldered (cutting a hole in the tube and soldering an extra ring of material on). Soldered tone-holes are thought by some to improve tone, but generally cost more.
Scale and pitch
The standard pitch has varied widely over history, and this has affected how flutes are made. Although the standard concert pitch today is A_{4} = 440 Hz, many manufacturers optimize the tone hole size/spacings for higher pitch options such as A_{4} = 442 Hz or A_{4} = 444 Hz. (As noted above, adjustments to the pitch of one note, usually the A_{4} fingering, can be made by moving the headjoint in and out of the headjoint tenon, but the point here is that the mechanical relationship of A_{4} to all other pitches is set when the tone holes are cut. However, small deviations from the objective 'mechanical' pitch (which is related to acoustic impedance of a given fingering) can be improvised by embouchure adjustments.)

== Composition ==
=== Classical music ===
An early version of Antonio Vivaldi's La tempesta di mare flute concerto was possibly written around 1713–1716, and would thus have been the first concerto for the instrument, as well as the earliest scoring of a high F_{6}, a problematic note for the Baroque flute of that period.

=== Pop, jazz, and rock ===
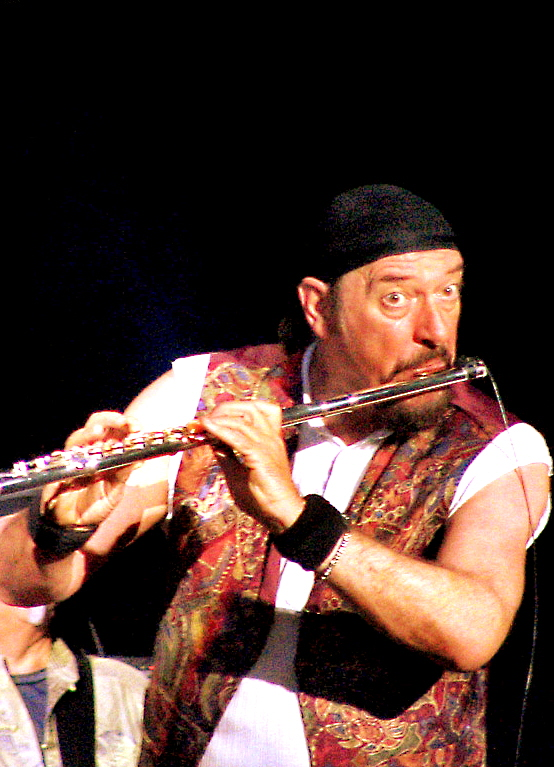
Ian Anderson of Jethro Tull playing a flute

Flutes were rarely used in early jazz. Drummer and bandleader Chick Webb was among the first to use flutes in jazz, beginning in the late 1930s. Frank Wess was among the first noteworthy flautists in jazz, in the 1940s. Since Theobald Boehm's fingering is used in saxophones as well as in concert flutes, many flute players "double" on saxophone for jazz and small ensembles and vice versa.

Since 1950, a number of notable performers have used flutes in jazz. Frank Foster and Frank Wess (Basie band), Jerome Richardson (Jones/Lewis big band) and Lew Tabackin (Akiyoshi/Tabackin big band) used flutes in big band contexts. In small band contexts, notable performers included Bud Shank, Herbie Mann, Yusef Lateef, Mélanie De Biasio, Joe Farrell, Rahsaan Roland Kirk, Charles Lloyd, Hubert Laws and Moe Koffman. Several modal jazz and avant-garde jazz performers have used the flute, including Eric Dolphy, Sam Rivers, and James Spaulding.

Jethro Tull is probably the best-known rock group to make regular use of the flute, which is played by its frontman, Ian Anderson. An alto flute is briefly heard in The Beatles song "You've Got to Hide Your Love Away", played by John Scott. The Beatles would later feature a flute more prominently in their single "Penny Lane".

Other groups that have used the flute in pop and rock songs include The Moody Blues, Chicago, Australian groups Men at Work and King Gizzard & the Lizard Wizard, the Canadian progressive rock group Harmonium, Dutch bands Focus and early Golden Earring, and the British groups Traffic, Genesis, Gong (although its flautist/saxophonist Didier Malherbe was French), Hawkwind, King Crimson, Camel, and Van der Graaf Generator.

American singer Lizzo is also known for playing the flute. Her instrument is named Sasha Flute, which has its own Instagram account.

== See also ==
- List of flute makers
- Flute method
- List of Western classical flautists
