= Contrabass flute =

Flute tuned in middle C

Contrabass Flute
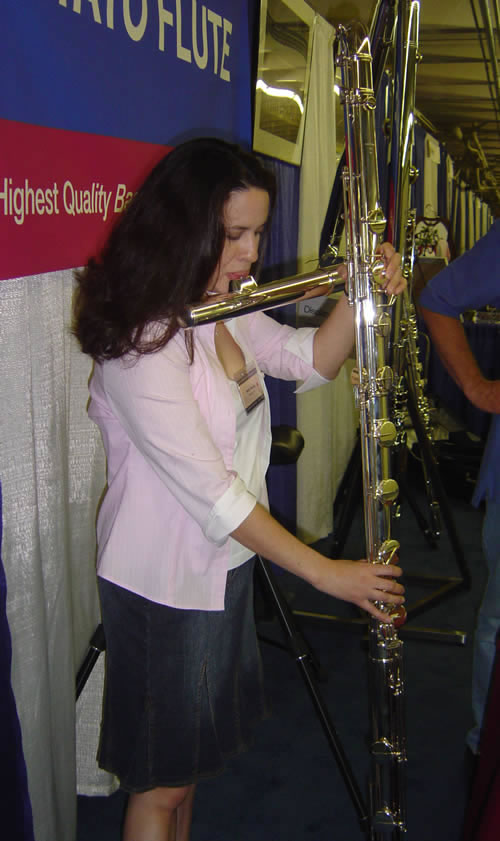
- Maria Ramey playing a Kotato contrabass flute

Woodwind instrument
- Classification: Wind; Woodwind; Aerophone
- Hornbostel–Sachs classification: 421.121.12-71 (Side-blown Aerophone with tone holes and keys)

Playing range
- Tessitura of the contrabass flute is C_{2}–C_{4}, sounding two octaves lower than written.

Related instruments
- Flutes: Piccolo; Treble; Soprano; C flute; Flûte d'amour; Alto; Bass; Contra-alto; Contrabass; Subcontrabass; Double Contrabass; Hyperbass

The contrabass flute is one of the rarer members of the flute family. Typically seen in flute ensembles, it is sometimes also used in solo and chamber music situations. Its range is similar to the regular concert flute, except it is pitched two octaves lower; the lowest performable note is two octaves below middle C (the lowest C on the cello). Many contrabass flutes in C are also equipped with a low B (in the same manner as many modern standard-sized flutes are). Contrabass flutes are only available from select flute makers.

The contrabass retains the facility for trills, as found elsewhere in the flute world. The contrabass' ease of arpeggiation is moderate and thus equivalent to the rest of the flute family. The contrabass flute requires a much greater air volume to produce sound than most other wind instruments, and a broader, slower air stream is needed to produce a solid tone. The upper registers (middle C and above) lack the tonal strength found in its cousins; the strongest register is arguably between G_{2} and G_{3}. The low register (below G_{2}) has similar qualities to the bassoon.

Contemporary musicians using the contrabass flute include Paige Dashner Long, Andy Findon, Laura Hyder, Madeleine Bischof, Pierre-Yves Artaud, Matthias Ziegler, Stefan Keller, Ned McGowan, Peter Sheridan, Patricia García, Sérgio Morais, David Lamont, Patrick Shaw Iversen, Vinny Golia and André 3000. Golia plays all flute sizes and recorded the CD Music for Like Instruments: The Flutes with a quartet of three other flutists.

The contrabass flute in C is produced by Jean-Yves Roosen (France), by the Japanese firm Kotato & Fukushima, Eva Kingma, Pearl, Di Zhao, and Christian Jäger from Munich. Jupiter Flutes has created a student model for flute ensembles. Kotato & Fukushima is one of the few sellers of double contrabass flutes.

Contrabass flutes have also been made from PVC pipe by the Dutch flute maker Jelle Hogenhuis. If the wall thickness is kept small, the PVC creates a louder contrabass. PVC can also sustain more rough treatment.

== Repertoire ==
New solo and chamber music is being composed for this instrument. Performer Peter Sheridan has commissioned numerous works from composers worldwide, including Alex Shapiro, Patrick Neher, Vinny Golia, Bruce Lawrence, Adrienne Albert, and Sheridon Stokes. As a virtuoso solo instrument, some concertos have been composed for the contrabass flute. Catherine McMichael composed a concerto for low flutes and orchestra in 2006 entitled 'Three Philosophies', in which one of the movements features the contrabass flute. In April 2008, the well-structured concerto "Bantammer's Swing" for contrabass flute and chamber orchestra by Ned McGowan premiered in Carnegie Hall. In 2010, the 'Lyric Concerto' for contrabass flute and strings was commissioned by Sheridan from the late Australian composer Bruce Lawrence. 'Nola' by composer Benjamin Yusapov was commissioned by the international soloist Matthias Ziegler for multiple low flutes and orchestra. Numerous composers have written for the contrabass flute, including Wil Offermans, Robert Dick, Thomas Seelig, Andrew Downes, Catherine McMichael, Phill Niblock, Günter Steinke, Juan Cerono, Nicolás Medero Larrosa, Fernando Curiel, Mariano Rocca, Angeles Rojas, Jorge Chikiar, Esteban Sebastiani, Valentin Pelisch, and Ezequiel Menalled.

Furthermore, the contrabass flute is utilized more in the flute choir, with most newer pieces including a part for the instrument. Though the part is either a duplicate or simplification of the bass flute part for many pieces, some of the newest repertoires include an independent contrabass flute part. Composers of such pieces include Peter Senchuk, Toby Caplan-Stonefield, Lawrence Ink, Phyllis Avidan Louke, and Judy Nishimura, among others.

== Variations ==
One variation is a "contrabass flute in G," or a contra-alto flute technically, as it is pitched a fourth below the bass flute and an octave lower than the alto flute. Another instrument is the sub-contrabass flute in G, pitched one octave below the contra-alto flute or two octaves below the alto flute in G. Kotato & Fukushima also produce a "sub-contrabass flute in C", or double contrabass flute pitched a full octave below the contrabass flute.

== In popular culture ==
The contrabass flute is one of the unusual instruments that were chosen to create the signature sound of the Horizon game series.
