= Piccolo =

Smaller version of the C flute

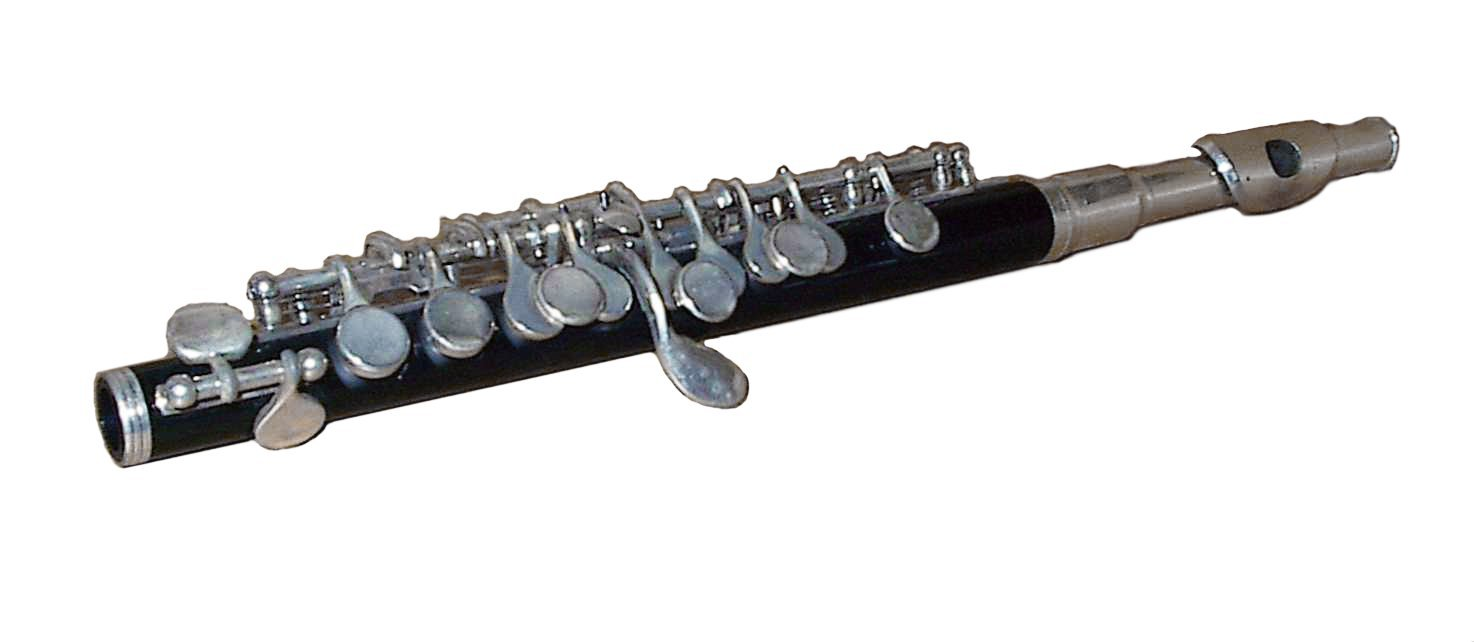
- Piccolo

Woodwind instrument
- Classification: Woodwind; Wind; Aerophone
- Hornbostel–Sachs classification: 421.121.12-71 (Flute-like aerophone with keys)

Playing range
- Tessitura of the piccolo is D_{5}–C_{8}. Some have a key for low C_{5}.

Related instruments
- Flutes: Piccolo; Treble; Soprano; C flute; Flûte d'amour; Alto; Bass; Contra-alto; Contrabass; Subcontrabass; Double Contrabass; Hyperbass

The piccolo (/ˈpɪkəloʊ/ PIK-ə-loh; Italian for 'small') is a smaller version of the western concert flute (Note: It is usually around 2 1/4 times smaller than a normal C flute.) and a member of the woodwind family of musical instruments. Sometimes referred to as a "baby flute" or piccolo flute, the modern piccolo has the same type of fingering as the standard transverse flute, but the sound it produces is an octave higher. This has given rise to the name ottavino (Note: Italian substantified adjective (an ellipsis of flauto ottavino, "small flute at the [high] octave") that means "small at the [high] octave". In the past ottavino was not a specific word for the piccolo, as it was also used for other instruments like the small spinet at the octave, spinetta ottavina or simply ottavino.) (Italian pronunciation: [ottaˈviːno]), by which the instrument is called in Italian and thus also in scores of Italian composers.

Early 19th-century French piccolo in D♭.

Piccolos are often orchestrated to double the violins or the flutes, adding sparkle and brilliance to the overall sound because of the aforementioned one-octave transposition upwards. The piccolo is a standard member in orchestras, marching bands, and wind ensembles.

== History ==
Since the Middle Ages, evidence indicates the use of octave transverse flutes as military instruments, as their penetrating sound was audible above battles. In cultured music, however, the first piccolos were used in some of Jean Philippe Rameau's works in the first half of the 18th century. Still, the instrument began to spread, and therefore to have a stable place in the orchestra, only at the beginning of 1800 A.D. During the Baroque period, the indication "flautino" or also "flauto piccolo" usually denoted a recorder of small size (soprano or sopranino). In particular, this is the case of the concertos that Antonio Vivaldi wrote for flautino. (Note: Moreover, even the simple indication flauto in the music of that period is to be understood as a (alto) recorder; the transverse flute was always explicitly requested with names such as flauto traverso or flauto traversiere. It is in fact only from the second quarter of the 18th century that the recorder begins a rapid decline which in the following decades will see the transverse flute become the only type of flute in cultured music.)

Until the end of the 19th century, the piccolo maintained the same construction. Historically, the piccolo had the same keys of the baroque flute (one key) and then of the classical and romantic simple system flute. At the end of the century, the piccolo began to be built with the Boehm mechanism, which would become the standard during the 1900s. However, it cannot wholly transition to the Boehm system since the bore has remained conical, as in the old system flute, and the first bottom note is D, like in the baroque flute. The piccolo should not be confused with the fife, which is traditionally one-piece, has a smaller, cylindrical bore, and produces a more strident sound.

== Traditional use ==
It is a myth that one of the earliest pieces to use the piccolo was Ludwig van Beethoven's Symphony No. 5 in C Minor, which premiered in December 1808. Although neither Joseph Haydn nor Wolfgang Amadeus Mozart used it in their symphonies, some of their contemporaries did, including Franz Anton Hoffmeister, Franz Xaver Süssmayr, and Michael Haydn. Also, Mozart used the piccolo in his opera Idomeneo. Gioachino Rossini later featured the instrument prominently in the overture to his opera Semiramide. Opera orchestras in Paris sometimes included small transverse flutes at the octave as early as 1735 as existing scores by Jean-Philippe Rameau show.

Piccolos are now mainly manufactured in the key of C or D. In the early 20th century, piccolos were manufactured in D♭ as they were an earlier model of the modern piccolo. For this D♭ piccolo, John Philip Sousa wrote the solo in the final repeat of the closing section (trio) of his march "The Stars and Stripes Forever".

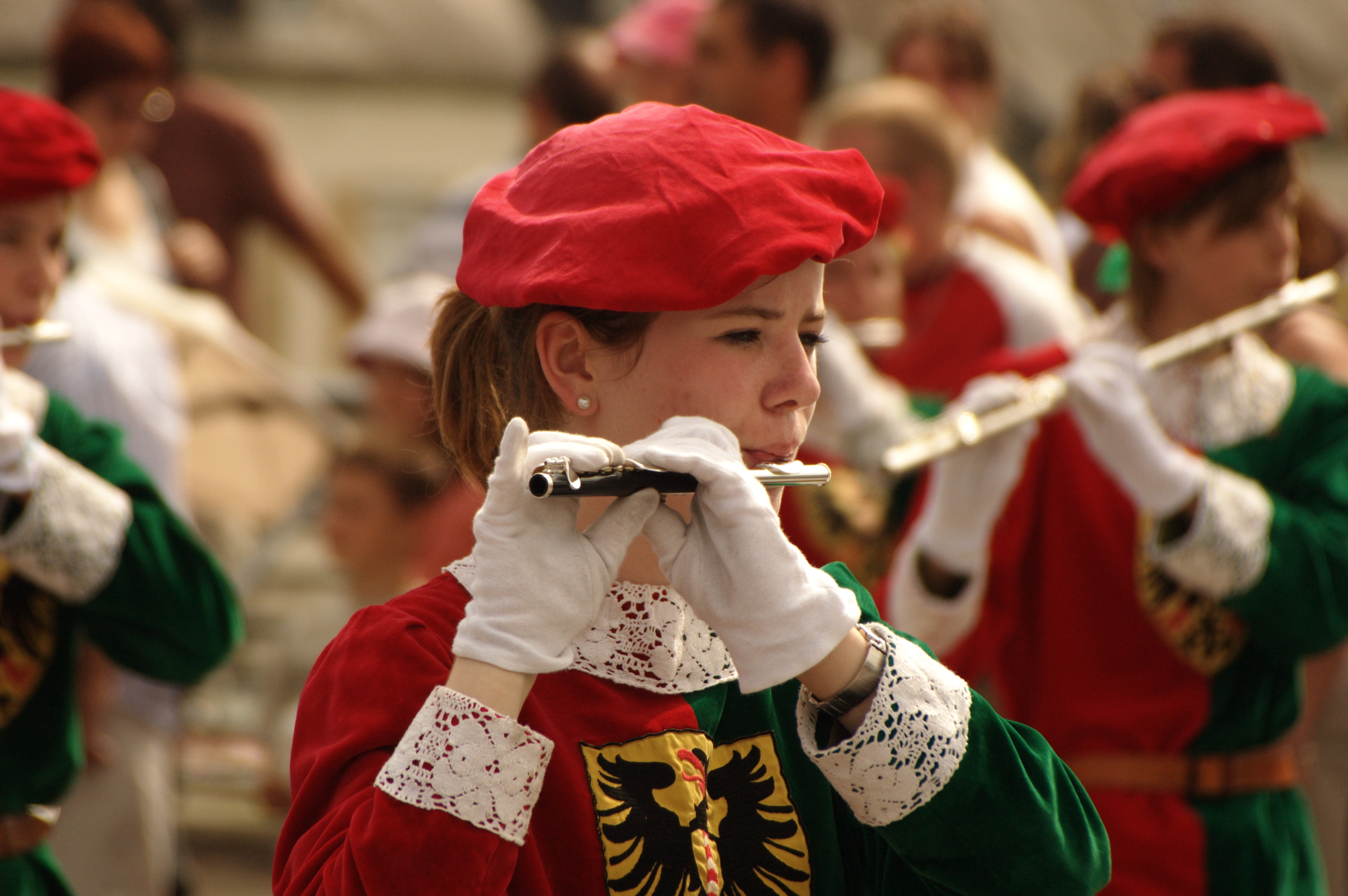
A piccolo being played

Although once made of wood, glass, or ivory, piccolos today are made from plastic, resin, brass, nickel silver, silver, and a variety of hardwoods, most commonly grenadilla. Finely made piccolos are often available with a variety of options similar to the flute, such as the split-E mechanism. Most piccolos have a conical body with a cylindrical head, like the Baroque flute and later flutes before the popularization of the Boehm bore used in modern flutes. Unlike other woodwind instruments, in most wooden piccolos, the tenon joint that connects the head to the body has two interference fit points surrounding the cork and metal side of the piccolo body joint.

The piccolo is used alongside marching drums in traditional formations at the Carnival of Basel, Switzerland.

In 2014, a festival was born entirely dedicated to the piccolo, the International Piccolo Festival, which takes place annually in July in Grado, Italy. Since 2021, Belgrade Piccolo Weeked festival in Belgrade, Serbia, with international guests takes place yearly.

== Repertoire ==
There are a number of pieces for piccolo alone by such composers as Samuel Adler, Miguel del Aguila, Robert Dick, Michael Isaacson, David Loeb, Amanda Harberg, Stephen Hough, Polly Moller, Vincent Persichetti, Karlheinz Stockhausen, and Brian Ferneyhough.

Repertoire for piccolo and piano, many of which are sonatas, has been composed by Miguel del Águila, Amanda Harberg, Robert Baksa, Robert Beaser, Rob du Bois, Howard J. Buss, Eugène Damaré, Pierre Max Dubois, Raymond Guiot, Lowell Liebermann, Peter Schickele, Michael Daugherty, and Gary Schocker.

Concertos have been composed for piccolo, including those by Lowell Liebermann, Sir Peter Maxwell Davies, Todd Goodman, Martin Amlin, Will Gay Bottje, Bruce Broughton, Valentino Bucchi, Avner Dorman, Jean Doué, Michael Easton, Robert Groslot, Egil Hovland, Guus Janssen, Daniel Pinkham, Jeff Manookian and Levente Gyöngyösi. The Piccolo Concerto by Amanda Harberg is one of the best known-examples.

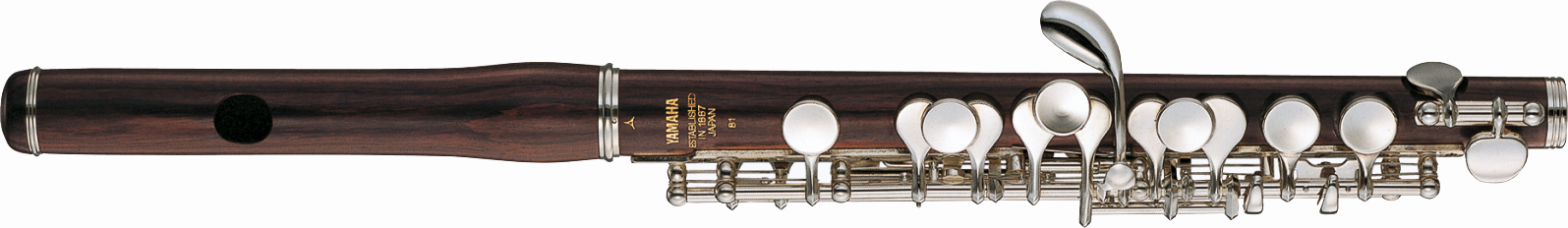
A concert piccolo with a grenadilla body and wave head joint and silver-plated keys

Additionally, there is now a selection of chamber music that uses the piccolo. One example is Stockhausen's Zungenspitzentanz, for piccolo and two euphoniums (or one synthesizer), with an optional percussionist and dancer. Another is George Crumb's Madrigals, Book II for soprano, flute (doubling piccolo/alto flute), and percussion. Other examples include a trio for piccolo, contrabassoon, and piano, 'Was mit den Tränen geschieht' by Stephen Hough, the Quintet for Piccolo and String Quartet by Graham Waterhouse, and Malambo for piccolo, double bass, and piano by Miguel del Aguila. Currently published trios for three piccolos include Quelque Chose canadienne (Something Canadian) by Nancy Nourse and Bird Tango by Crt Sojar Voglar for three piccolos with piano. Petrushka's Ghost for eight piccolos by Melvin Lauf, Jr. and Una piccolo sinfonia for nine piccolos by Matthew King are two more examples.

Piccolo specialist Peter Verhoyen has commissioned, inspired and premiered a large number of works for the piccolo: list of compositions written for Peter Verhoyen.

== See also ==
- List of piccolo players

== Bibliography ==
- Gippo, Jan (ed.). The Complete Piccolo: A Comprehensive Guide to Fingerings, Repertoire, and History, second edition, foreword by Laurie Sokoloff; contributing editors, Therese Wacker, Morgan Williams, and Tammy Sue Kirk. Bryn Mawr: Theodore Presser Company, 2008. ISBN 978-1-59806-111-6
