= Contra-alto flute =

Semi-larger flute

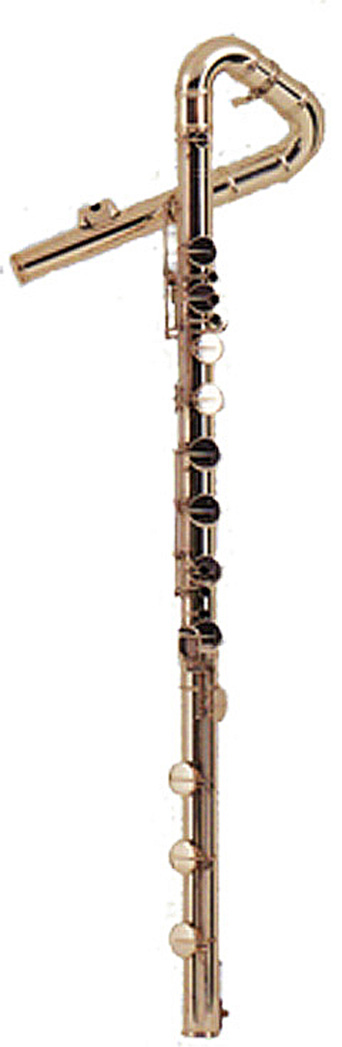

Woodwind instrument
- Classification: Wind; Woodwind; Aerophone
- Hornbostel–Sachs classification: 421.121.12-71 (Side-blown Aerophone with tone holes and keys)

Playing range
- The contra-alto flute, notated in treble clef, sounds an octave and a fourth lower than written. The tessitura is G_{2}–D_{5}.

Related instruments
- Flutes: Piccolo; Treble; Soprano; C flute; Flûte d'amour; Alto; Bass; Contra-alto; Contrabass; Subcontrabass; Double Contrabass; Hyperbass

The contra-alto flute is a large member of the flute family, pitched between the bass and the contrabass. It is a transposing instrument either in G (a perfect fourth below the bass and one octave below the alto) or in F (a perfect fifth below the bass and a major ninth below the alto). The instrument's body is held vertically with an adjustable floor peg similar to that of the bass clarinet. The instrument maker Eva Kingma calls her contra-alto flute a "contr'alto flute in G", while Kotato & Fukushima call their instrument a "bass flute in F". Kotato & Fukushima's instrument sells for US$17,500.
