= Soprano flute =

Rare Flute pitched in Eb

Woodwind instrument
- Other names: Third flute, tierce flute; fr: flûte à tierce; de: Terzflöte
- Classification: Woodwind (Aerophone)
- Hornbostel–Sachs classification: 421.121.12 (open side-blown flute with fingerholes)

Playing range
- written range similar to the Western concert flute, but sounding a minor third higher

Related instruments
- Flute, alto flute, bass flute, piccolo

The soprano flute (also called a third flute or tierce flute) is a type of flute, a musical instrument in the woodwind family. It is pitched in E♭, a minor third above the concert flute, and is one of the few members of the modern flute family that is not pitched in C or G. The pitch was set at a time such flutes substituted for the E-flat clarinet.

The instrument is now rare. A few American publications for flute choir currently include a part for E♭ (soprano) flute. In these publications, an alternative part is provided either for the C flute or for the piccolo. With the substitution of one of these more common instruments, however, the distinctive colour of a treble flute sound is missing.

Soprano flutes have also been made in F, sounding a perfect fourth higher than the concert flute.
