= List of flute makers =

The following are flute makers who produce flutes from a wide variety of materials:

Flute makers
Maker	Country of origin	Comment/description	Active?	Flute maker?	Head joint maker?
Furones Cuadrado, Alvaro	Belgium	Professional NAFstyle maker, specialty in double and triple drone flutes (www.fucuflutes.com)	Yes	Yes	Yes
Abell, Christopher	USA	Maker of wooden flutes and wooden penny whistles	Yes	Yes	Yes
Aihara	Japan		Yes	Yes	No
Akiyama	Japan		Yes	Yes	No
Allen, Michael J.	United Kingdom	Maker of handmade flutes	Yes	Yes	Yes
Almeida, Edward "Ed"	USA	Master craftsman, died 1992	No	Yes	No
Altus	Japan	Well-known maker of high end flutes	Yes	Yes	No
Juan Arista	USA	Professional flutes and headjoints made in precious metals alto flute headjoints	Yes	Yes	Yes
Manuel Arista	USA	Professional flutes and headjoints made in precious metals	Yes	Yes	Yes
Miguel Arista	USA	Professional flutes and headjoints made in precious metals alto flute headjoints	Yes	Yes	Yes
Armstrong	USA	Now owned by Conn-Selmer	Yes	Yes	No
Artley	USA	Now defunct Conn-Selmer brand. The company made piccolos, C flutes, E-flat soprano flutes, alto and bass flutes. (The bass flute was designed by T.S. Ogilvie)	No	Yes	No
Avanti	USA	A Conn-Selmer brand	No	Yes	No
Azumi by Altus	Japan	Intermediate Altus models	Yes	Yes	No
Bertrem, Brian	USA		Yes	Yes	No
Bigio, Robert	United Kingdom	British flautist, Historian, writer and flutemaker. Known for wooden flutes, but currently making only headjoints.	Yes	Yes	Yes
Bonneville	France	Now defunct historic French flute maker.	No	Yes	No
Boosey & Hawkes	United Kingdom		No	Yes	No
Brannen Brothers	USA	Maker of fine flutes and known for collaborations with Brogger, Cooper, Lafin, and Kingma	Yes	Yes	Yes
Braun, Anton	Germany		Yes	Yes	No
Briccialdi	Italy		Yes	Yes	Yes
Buffet Crampon	France	No longer makes flutes	No	Yes	No
Bulgheroni	Italy	Wooden Flute and Piccolo flute maker	Yes	Yes	Yes
Burkart-Phelan	USA	Professional level flutes and piccolos	Yes	Yes	Yes
Chu, David	USA	Maker of Wooden Flutes and Wood & Bamboo Headjoints for Boehm Flutes & Alto Flutes	Yes	Yes	Yes
Conn-Selmer	USA		Yes	Yes	No
Cooper, Albert	United Kingdom	Master craftsman and flute innovator, died 2011	No	Yes	Yes
Cundy-Bettoney Co.	USA		No	Yes	No
Doyle, Martin	Ireland	Making simple system wooden Irish flute, Baroque flutes and head-joints for concert flutes	Yes	Yes	Yes
Drelinger, Sanford "Sandy"	USA	Died April 2021	Yes	No	Yes
Eloy	Netherlands	Handmade flutes made from unique Japanese style alloys	Yes	Yes	No
Emanuel Flutes	Boston, USA	Hand made flutes for professionals made to order	Yes	Yes	Yes
Eppler, Alexander	USA		No	Yes	No
Erik the Flutemaker	USA	Specializing in handcrafted bamboo flutes	Yes	Yes	No
Fehr, Thomas	Switzerland		Yes	No	Yes
Faulisi, Salvatore	France		Yes	No	Yes
Fisher	Germany	Wood and metal flutes	Yes	Yes	No
Flute Lab	Netherlands		Yes	No	Yes
FMC	Japan		Yes	Yes	No
Fluteworx	South Africa		Yes	Yes	No
Gemeinhardt	USA/Taiwan	Including the Brio! model. Majority-owned by Angel Industries Co. Ltd. of Taiwan since 2011.	Yes	Yes	Yes
Geoghegan Co.	USA	Founded by Michael Geoghegan, the company was pioneer in silver brazing tone holes	Yes	Yes	No
Gerhard Sachs	Germany	Very low-profile fine Flute maker from Sonnenbühl	No	Yes	Yes
Giorgessi, Giorgio	Italy		Yes	No	Yes
Goosman	USA	Mara died 2015.	No	Yes	Yes
Gordon, Martin	United Kingdom/USA		Yes	No	Yes
Gorset, Hans Olav	Norway	Baroque flutes	Yes	Yes	
Gosse, Harry	Germany		Yes	No	Yes
Green, Tom	USA		No	Yes	No
Guo Musical Instrument Co.	Taiwan	Manufacturer of composite material flutes. Geoffrey Guo invented the material Grenaditte, which is used both in his instruments and Pearl piccolos. One of the few manufacturers of G Treble Flutes.	Yes	Yes	Yes
Halfvares, Mats	Sweden	Baroque flute maker	Yes	Yes	No
Hammig, Bernhard	Germany	Famous flutemaking dynasty	Yes	Yes	Yes
Hammig, Philipp and Aug.Rich. OHG	Germany	Famous flutemaking dynasty	Yes	Yes	No
Haynes, William S.	USA	Historic Boston flutemaker	Yes	Yes	Yes
Hutton, Trevor	New Zealand		No	Yes	Yes
Inderbinen	Switzerland		Yes	Yes	No
Iwao	Japan		Yes	Yes	No
James, Trevor	United Kingdom-Taiwan		Yes	Yes	No
Josef Müller	Germany		Yes	Yes	Yes
Jupiter	Taiwan		Yes	Yes	No
Jochen Mehnert & Söhne	Germany		Yes	Yes	Yes
Karl Hammerschmidt & Söhne	Germany	Historic woodwind maker. Still produces six/seven-keyed simple system Piccolos, but in the pitch of C-sharp.	Yes	Yes	No
Keefe	USA	Wood Piccolos	Yes	Yes	Yes
King, Travis	B.C. Canada	Irish wooden flutes	Yes	Yes	No
Kingma, Eva	Netherlands	Low flute maker and designer of the kingma system	Yes	Yes	No
Koregelos	USA	George Koregelos, also founder of House of Woodwind, died 2012, made flutes in the 1970s.	No	Yes	No
Kotato	Japan	Famous for low flutes	Yes	Yes	No
Kuiper, Dirk	Netherlands	died 2006	No	Yes	No
Lacy, Tom	USA		Yes	Yes	No
Lafin, J. R.	Germany	master headjoint maker	Yes	No	Yes
Lamberson, Nathaniel "Tip"	USA	ret. 1985, died 2005	No	Yes	No
Landell, Jonathon	USA	Master flutemaker making handmade flutes in Pennsylvania	Yes	Yes	Yes
Kramer, Christoph	Germany	Master headjointmaker	Yes	No	Yes
Lebret	France	Defunct historical flute maker	No	Yes	No
Lehner, John	Australia		Yes	Yes	No
Levit	USA		Yes	Yes	Yes
Lewis, Gary	USA		Yes	Yes	No
Lopatin, Leonard E.	USA	Retired Maker and designer of the SquareONE family of flutes made with square tone holes, to the Lopatin Scale	No	Yes	Yes
Lot, Louis	France	Most famous French flute maker of the 19th century	No	Yes	No
Lucas Fovet	France	Gasba, Kaval, Quena, Saxoflute, Svirka, Flauta Transversal, Bamboo flutes	Yes	Yes	Yes
Lunn, John	USA	Maker of artistic and decorative concert flutes. Retired in 2020	No	Yes	No
Mancke	Germany		Yes	No	Yes
Mascolo	Brazil	Handmade head joint	Yes	No	Yes
Mateki	Japan	Closed on 31 december 2019	no	Yes	No
Matija (Formerly Murali)	China and Thailand	Boston flutemaker manufacturing in China and Thailand	Yes	Yes	Yes
Matit	Finland		Yes	Yes	No
McCanless	USA		No	Yes	No
McChord Flutes	USA	Manufacturer of handmade and custom headjoints of the highest quality	Yes	No	Yes
McKenna, Chris	USA		Yes	Yes	No
McLauchlan, Ian	United Kingdom		No	No	Yes
Mehnert	Germany	Böhm flute maker since 1891	Yes	Yes	Yes
Michael, J.	China		Yes	Yes	No
Miyazawa	Japan		Yes	Yes	No
Moore, Jack	USA	Master craftsman. RIP. Made Alex Murray system flutes.	No	Yes	No
Muramatsu	Japan		Yes	Yes	No
Myall-Allen	United Kingdom	Treble flute in G	Yes	Yes	No
Nagahara	USA		Yes	Yes	Yes
Natsuki	Japan		Yes	Yes	No
Nomata	Japan		Yes	Yes	No
Northbridge	USA China		Yes	Yes	No
Novo, Juan	USA	Maker of the FANTASIA flute and custom wooden headjoints	Yes	Yes	Yes
Oleg	USA	Oleg Garbuzov died in 2022. His company no longer offers flutes, headjoints or flute-related products.	No	No	No
Olwell Flutes	USA	Father and son, Patrick and Aaron Olwell, makers of mainly Irish flutes	Yes	Yes	Yes
Opperman	USA	Maker of piccolos, alto and bass flutes as well as C flutes and head joints, died 2016	No	Yes	No
Oxley, Andrew	United Kingdom		Yes	No	Yes
Parmenon	France	Maker of concert flutes (Buffet Crampon group)	Yes	Yes	Yes
Pap, Marton - TheFluteMan	Philippines	Maker of Native American Flutes, Mid To Bass Range	Yes	Yes	Yes
Pearl Flutes	Japan	Maker of Piccolos, C Flutes, Alto and Bass Flutes, and Contrabass Flutes	Yes	Yes	Yes
Pettry Piccolos	USA	Wood Piccolos and Wood Flute Headjoints	Yes	Yes	Yes
Powell, Verne Q.	USA	Boston flute maker (Buffet Crampon group)	Yes	Yes	Yes
Powell, Edward V.	USA	Son of Verne Q. Powell	No	Yes	No
Resona	USA China	Intermediate range flute produced by Burkart	Yes	Yes	No
Reynolds, F.A.	USA		No	Yes	No
Rittershausen, Emil	Germany	Boehm’s successor, died 1927	No	Yes	No
Roberts, Howell	United Kingdom		Yes	No	Yes
Roosen	France		Yes	Yes	No
Rudall, Carte & Co	United Kingdom	Most important historic English flute maker	No	Yes	No
Sagerman, Gene	USA		Yes	No	Yes
Sakurai	Japan		Yes	Yes	No
Sankyo Flute Company	Japan	Founded 1968 and well-known for high quality flutes.	Yes	Yes	No
Sheridan, Dana	USA/Germany	Retired	No	Yes	Yes
Solexa	USA China		Yes	Yes	No
Song Flute	Korea		No	No	Yes
Spell, Eldred	USA	Wooden piccolo headjoints and contribution to the Bennett Scale	No	No	No
Straubinger Flutes	USA	Also known for making successful synthetic pads adopted for many high-end flutes	Yes	Yes	No
Takumi Flute	Tokyo		No	Yes	No
Tomasi	Austria		Yes	Yes	Yes
Verhoef, Alfred	Netherlands	Handmade wooden concert flutes in five sorts of wood.	Yes	Yes	No
Viento			Yes	Yes	No
Webb, John	United Kingdom	Retired	No	No	Yes
Wenner, Martin	Germany		Yes	No	Yes
Wessel, Stephen	United Kingdom		Yes	Yes	No
Williams, David	USA		Yes	Yes	Yes
Wimberly, David	CAN		Yes	Yes	Yes
Wisemann	USA		Yes	Yes	No
Worrell, Peter	United Kingdom		Yes	No	Yes
Yamaha	Japan/USA		Yes	Yes	No
Yang, Dean			Yes	Yes	No
Zhao, Di	China		Yes	Yes	No
