= William S. Haynes Flute Company =

American flute manufacturer

William S. Haynes Flute Co.
- Founder: William S. Haynes
- Fate: Acquired by Eastman Music Company in 2004
- Headquarters: United States
- Products: Flutes and other woodwind instruments
- Website: wmshaynes.com

The William S. Haynes Flute Company is an American flute-manufacturing company, established in 1888 by William S. Haynes and George W. Haynes. Originating in Boston, the company has since relocated its main workshop to Acton, Massachusetts.

The company, also referred to simply as "Haynes," is one of the world's leading producers of concert flutes, and America's oldest flute manufacturer. Since 2004, it has been owned by Eastman Music Company.

== History ==
Before the company was established, William S. Haynes and his brother, George, worked as silversmiths in Rhode Island, having apprenticed as jewelers. In 1888, they were commissioned by Edward Heindl, the then-Principal Flutist of the Boston Symphony Orchestra, to make him a Boehm system wood flute.

The Haynes brothers then produced over 500 flutes with the (unrelated) JC Haynes Company in Boston. Their 507th flute was the first of the new Haynes Company, established in 1888.

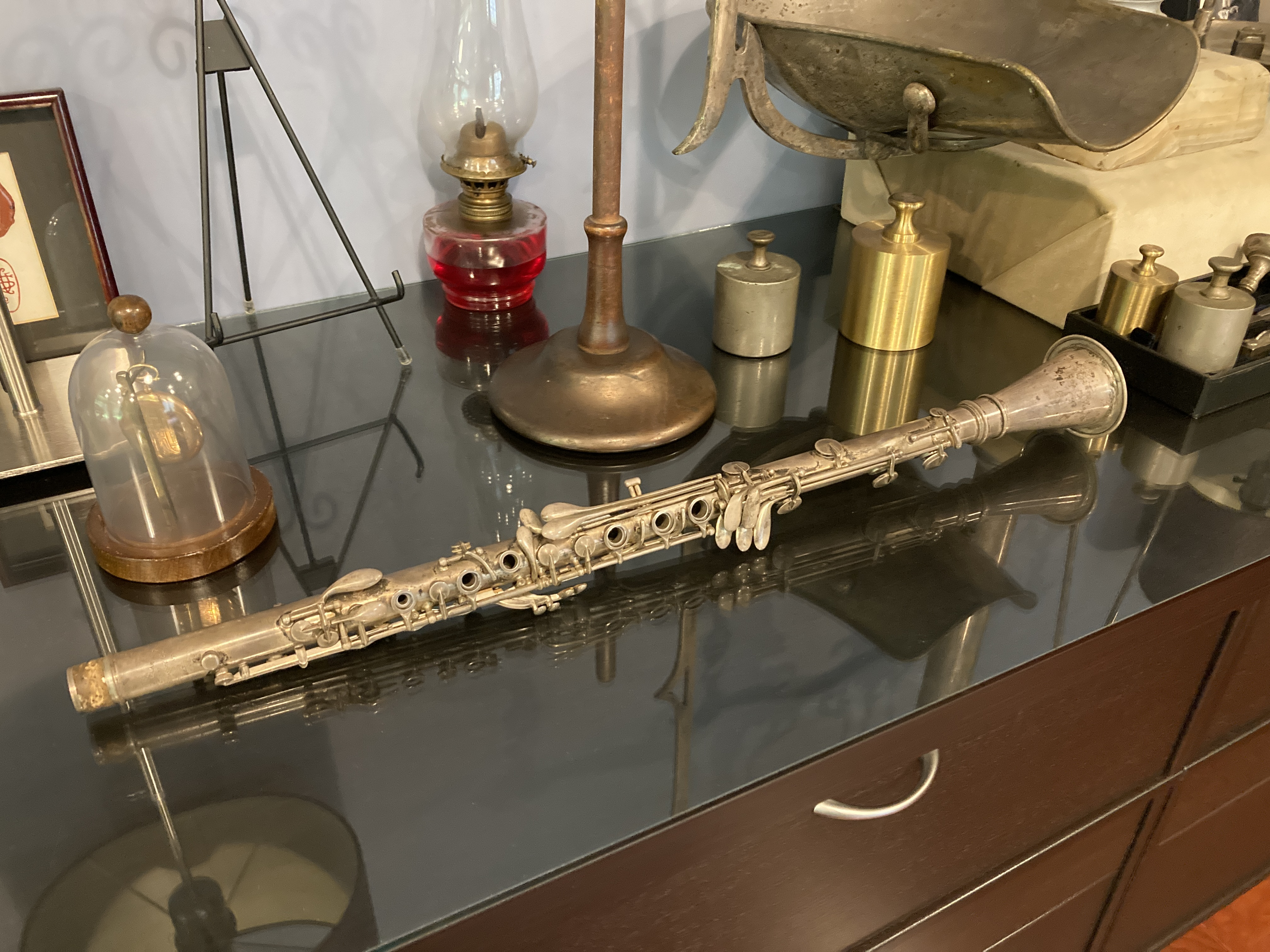
Early example of the silver clarinet from William S. Haynes Company. Behind it, on the left, is the pocket watch Powell gifted Haynes in 1926.

In 1896, Haynes began to make a name for itself, producing the first American gold flute for Henry Jaeger, then the Principal Flutist of the US Marine Band. Two years later, in 1898, George Haynes patented his creation of the drawn tone hole design for the flute, perfecting the design in 1913. These innovations completely revolutionized flute-making.

From 1913 until 1926, the founder of Haynes's greatest American competitor, Verne Q. Powell, was employed at Haynes, even working as a company director for a time. Upon leaving, Powell gifted William S. Haynes a hand-engraved pocket watch featuring the Haynes logo on the back. This watch is still on display in the Haynes showroom today.

Other innovations helped continue the company's growth. They produced their first cylindrical, solid-silver piccolo in 1916, followed by the first A-flat piccolo in 1917, for use in American military bands. Briefly, beginning in 1926 and ending in 1942, Haynes experimented with making silver clarinets. They were known as "thermoclarinets" as they allowed the player to quickly and easily warm the instrument for tone changes. The company produced a total of 334 silver clarinets. That same year, they produced the first conical bore piccolo.

In 1936, founder William S. Haynes retired, giving his wife, Lola Haynes-Perkins, ownership of the company. Lola Haynes-Perkins's brother, L. Mont Allison, was the master flute-maker and president of the company in this period.

Mr. Haynes died in 1939 in Florida, though he was buried in Mt. Auburn Cemetery in Cambridge, MA. Lola Haynes-Perkins died in 1968, and the company transferred to her family. In 1976, Lewis Deveau, former President and General Manager of Haynes, purchased the company.

In 2004, the company was acquired by the Eastman Music Company, ⁣owned by classically-trained flutist Quan Ni, and moved their main workshop to Acton, Massachusetts, where it is still located today. The eight previous locations of the company's main workshop include the following (all in Boston, Massachusetts): Chapman Place (1891–3), Sudbury Street (1893–7), Stanhope Street (1897–1900), Washington Street (1900–18), 34 Columbus Avenue (1918–21), 135 Columbus Avenue (1921–47), 108 Massachusetts Avenue (1947–1953), and 12 Piedmont Street (1953–2003).

=== Other Milestones ===
Some other interesting and historic moments for the company include the following:

- The last of the wood flutes Haynes produced were issued in 1918, except for special orders. From then on, all flutes the company produced were metal.
- In 1935, the company produced a platinum flute commissioned by Georges Barrère. Some sources claim this may have been the first all-platinum instrument in the world, and while this is unclear, it was certainly an American first.
- In 1993, Dr. Ellen Ochoa, the first Hispanic woman in space, brought her Haynes flute with her to space, making Haynes flutes the first flutes in space.
- In November 2009, James Galway, world-renowned flutist, visited the company. Five years later, Haynes introduced a flute named after him: the Sir James Galway Model Q Series Flute.
- A number of instruments Haynes has produced are archived with the Library of Congress.

== Products ==
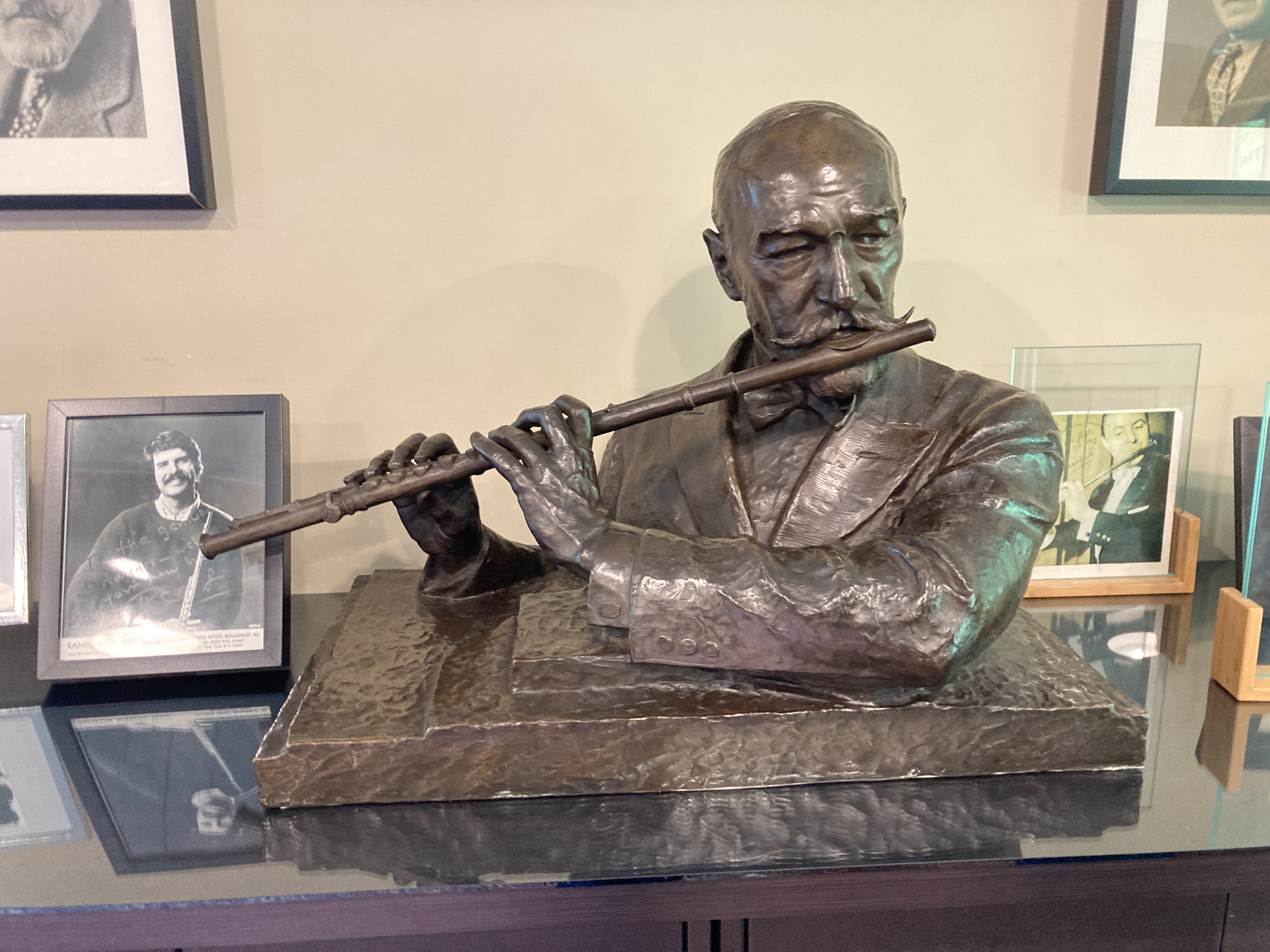
Bust of William S. Haynes, on display at the Acton workshop's showroom.

Currently, Haynes produces multiple models for their flutes, and one model for the piccolo.

1. The Q series concert flute, established in 2010
2. The Amadeus concert flute, named after the famous composer Wolfgang Amadeus Mozart
3. Custom concert flutes
4. The Amadeus Alto flute
5. The Bravo flute, specifically designed for "the advancing student."
6. The Amadeus piccolo

The Q and Amadeus concert flutes use the standard Haynes A-442 Scale for their flute's ideal pitch. This is slightly higher than the Western standard concert pitch, which is A-440.

Haynes also produces custom crowns and head joints. They make head joints and other parts of their instruments in a range of metals including silver, gold, and platinum.

== Artists ==
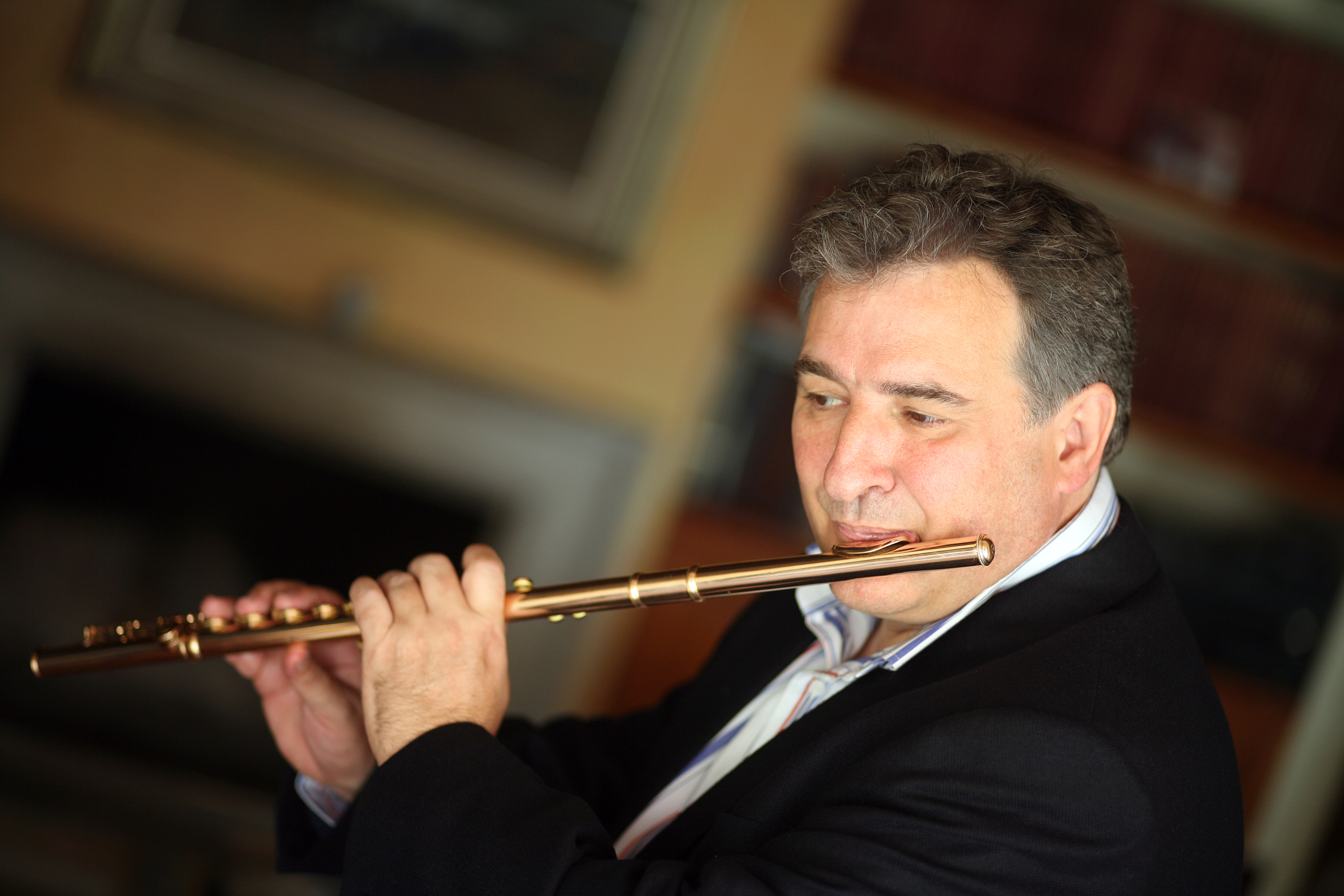
Claudi Arimany, one of the numerous Haynes artists.

Flute players associated with the Haynes brand are known as Haynes artists. Current Haynes artists include:

- Claudi Arimany
- Jeanne Baxtresser
- Marianne Gedigian
- Won Lee
- Bill McBirnie
- Gareth McLearnon
- Ulla Miilmann
- Diana Morgan
- Seth Morris
- Emmanuel Pahud
- Marina Piccinini
- Amy Porter
- Jane Rutter
- Gary Schocker
- Nestor Torres
- Ransom Wilson

== Young Artists ==
- Nikka Gershman

== See also ==
- Powell Flutes
- Silva-Bet
- Brannen Brothers
- Sankyo Flute Company
