= Emmanuel Pahud =

Swiss flutist (born 1970)

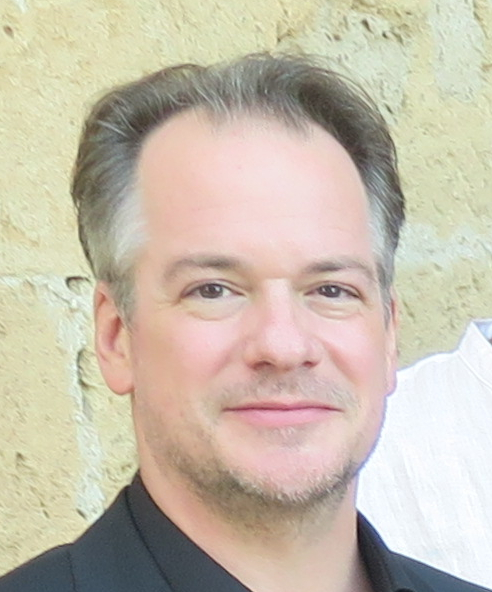
- Pahud in 2019

Background information
- Born: 27 January 1970 (age 56); Geneva, Switzerland
- Genres: Baroque; classical; jazz
- Occupation: Musician
- Instrument: Flute
- Years active: 1985–present
- Label: EMI Classics
- Website: emmanuelpahud.net

Emmanuel Pahud (born 27 January 1970) is a Swiss flutist.

He was born in Geneva, Switzerland. His father is of French and Swiss background and his mother is French. The Berlin-based flutist is most known for his baroque and classical flute repertoire.

Pahud was born into a nonmusical family. As a young boy living in Italy, Pahud was captivated by the sounds of the flute. From the age of four to the age of 22, he studied with flutists such as François Binet, Carlos Bruneel and Aurèle Nicolet. Classically trained at the Conservatoire de Paris, he leapt into the international orchestral and solo music scene when he joined the Berlin Philharmonic Orchestra in 1992. His versatility in music styles over the years has "signalled the arrival of a new master flautist" (The Guardian). He plays in diverse music genres, whether baroque, jazz, contemporary, classical, orchestral, or chamber music.

== Early life ==
Playing has been a big part of Emmanuel Pahud's life from birth. His father worked for a US company, and the family moved repeatedly during his childhood. However, this would only shape Pahud's international outlook for his future. Only 3 weeks after Pahud was born, his parents moved to Baghdad for one year. They moved again when he was one to Paris, where Emmanuel's younger brother was born. In 1972, they then moved to Madrid for two years, and in 1974, finally settled in Rome for four years. The Swiss-French Binet family, whose four children played musical instruments, lived in the same apartment building in Rome. The father (François) was a flautist who studied in Zürich and Paris but stopped performing in later years. At the age of four, Pahud first heard the flute. As the eldest son Philippe played Mozart's Flute Concerto No. 1, it set the course to a remarkable chapter of Pahud's life. He recalls:

I could hear the flute, the violin, the cello, the piano. I don't know why I chose the flute but maybe it was because the eldest son was playing it, so he was the one playing at the best level at that time – or because the father was also a flute player, so there was a kind of authority there. Anyhow, I said to my parents, "I want to play the flute, I want to play the Mozart concerto that guy next door is practicing."

A neighbor of the Pahud's also inspired Emmanuel. At age four, he would whistle along to the neighbor's son playing his flute, learning it was Mozart.

That Christmas, after receiving his first flute, Pahud began his first year of lessons with Philippe (who was only 15 years old) and the next three years with Phillipe's father, François. In 1978, at the age of eight, the Pahud family moved to Brussels, Belgium. Emmanuel then began studying at the Music Academy of Uccle in Southern Brussels. There he studied with Michel Moinil from 1979 to 1985. As he became more determined and focused on playing the flute at a higher level, Pahud began to study from 1984 to 1987 with Carlos Bruneel, the then and current principal flautist of the Théâtre Royal de la Monnaie opera house in Brussels. In 1985, Pahud won the National Competition of Belgium (le concours National de Belgique) and in the same year, he played his first concert with the National Orchestra of Belgium, performing the piece that inspired him 11 years earlier: Mozart Concerto K.313 in G Major. Pahud remained in Brussels until receiving his Baccalaureat at the age of 17 and went off to finish his schooling in Paris. With the strong support of his family, he also received lessons with other of Europe's finest players, including Peter-Lukas Graf in Basel.

=== Studies and early accomplishments ===
Pahud attended the Conservatoire de Paris (Conservatoire National Supérieur de Musique de Paris) in France, studying with Michel Debost, Alain Marion, Pierre-Yves Artaud, and Christian Lardé. Whilst studying, he won two major competitions, one in Duino 1988 and the other in Kobe in 1989. In 1988, Emmanuel also won the 2nd Prize at the International Scheveningen Music Competition in Scheveningen, Netherlands. Winning these competitions put Pahud in the forefront to become principal flautist in the Basel Radio Symphony, under the direction of Nello Santi which he obtained the position in 1989 whilst finishing his studies in Paris. He resigned from the orchestra in 1992. Pahud also held the principal flautist position at the Munich Philharmonic under Sergiu Celibidache. Pahud graduated at the age of 20 from the Conservatoire in 1990, obtaining the First Prize (Premier Prix). He then continued to advance his studies for the next two years in style and interpretation with one of France's greatest flautists, Swiss-born Aurèle Nicolet, who turned out to be his neighbour. In 1992, Nicolet prepared Pahud in an extensive 10-day rehearsal for both the Geneva International Music Competition, or le Concours International de Genève in September of that year and the audition for principal flautist of the Berlin Philharmonic Orchestra (BPO) in October. He attributes achieving both the first prize at le Concours International de Genève and being appointed for the position at the age of 22 by BPO's conductor, Claudio Abbado, to his experience with Nicolet.

== Career ==
=== Berlin Philharmonic Orchestra ===
Being appointed as principal flutist at the Berlin Philharmonic Orchestra (BPO) signalled Pahud's entrance into the international spotlight. He entered the orchestra during its rejuvenation period as the post-war generation of players began to retire. Over 40 per cent, including Pahud's position was up for audition, or on trial. His predecessor was Karlheinz Zöller (1960–69, 1976–93). Apart from Pahud, other previous international flutists held the same principal flutist position such as Aurèle Nicolet (1950–59) and Sir James Galway (1969–75). Pahud wrote of his experience playing with the orchestra:

There was a way of phrasing and wave that goes throughout the orchestra, coming from the bass and shaping the phrase with amazing beauty and intensity. The dynamic range of the orchestra was phenomenal. The art of playing with the Berlin Phil is very different compared to other Orchestras, where we work as equals with our individual voice.

Pahud at 22 was the youngest player in the Berlin Philharmonic, a position to which he returned in 2002 under Sir Simon Rattle after taking an 18-month sabbatical in 2000 in order to teach the Virtuosity Class at the Conservatoire de Musique de Genève for one year and to perform in concerts worldwide. He was surprised on how emotional it was to leave the BPO. He recalls his emotions beginning a couple of hours before playing his last concert and only leaving him once he rejoined BPO in 2002. The versatility and authority of current conductor Sir Simon Rattle, says Pahud, gives the orchestra a unique working partnership and a capacity to be more adventurous in its exploration of repertoire. He also sees Rattle as an intellect; "he knows the orchestra and he achieves what he wants by taking into account the vision of the musicians. In addition, Pahud also observed that whilst the former conductor Herbert von Karajan "produced a big string sound with a great legato. The Rattle sound is a very transparent and constructed sound, with much more articulation to achieve definition in the sound." In baroque and classical music, this represents the influence of period performance.

The Berlin Philharmonic these days considers themselves a very individualist and soloistic "large ensemble." In 2007, Pahud was voted onto the Media Vorstand (or the Member of the Media Board) of the BPO. He shared the principal flute position with Mathieu Dufour until 2022, when Dufour was replaced by Sébastian Jacot.

=== International appearances ===
Pahud's workload has more than tripled since the early days of his international career in 1992. At that time he was doing about 50 concerts a year – but with the success of his solo career and continued involvement with the Berlin Philharmonic Orchestra, that number has spiralled to around 160: 90 solo or chamber music and 75 orchestral concerts in an average year – roughly twice the number of performances that most musicians would consider a heavy work-load. Pahud says that it's a balance he has had all his life and what prevents him from being isolated in one genre or repertoire of music, or what he calls "a musical corner".

In 1993, Pahud began accepting international concert performances soon after settling into his position in Berlin. He has appeared as soloist with internationally renowned orchestras in addition to the Berlin Philharmonic: the Yomiuri Nippon Symphony Orchestra, the London Symphony Orchestra, the Tonhalle-Orchester Zürich, the Orchestre de la Suisse Romande, the Geneva Camerata the Berlin Radio Symphony Orchestra, and the Danish Radio Symphony also known as the Danish National Symphony Orchestra. He also appears regularly at leading festivals throughout Europe, the United States and Asia. His more famous international concerto appearances and collaborations of the past few seasons (2005–2008) included the Berlin Philharmonic, the Baltimore Symphony Orchestra, the London Philharmonic Orchestra, the Monte-Carlo Philharmonic Orchestra, the Bavarian Radio Symphony Orchestra, the NHK Symphony Orchestra, the Berliner Barock-Solisten, the Sofia Philharmonic Orchestra, the Vienna Radio Symphony Orchestra, the Orchestre National de Belgique, the Orchestre philharmonique de Radio France and a US tour with the Barcelona Symphony and Catalonia National Orchestra (including a Carnegie Hall debut). Another famous concerto collaboration took place in 2005–2006 with the Australian Chamber Orchestra in reviving the Vivaldi Flute Concertos.

Among the conductors with whom Pahud has worked are Claudio Abbado, Giovanni Antonini, Daniel Barenboim, Pierre Boulez, Sir John Eliot Gardiner, Daniel Harding, Paavo Järvi, Lorin Maazel, Yannick Nézet-Séguin, Trevor Pinnock, Sir Simon Rattle Nayden Todorov and David Zinman.

Pahud is also a dedicated chamber musician and has recently made international appearances throughout Europe, North America and Japan in recital with pianists Éric Le Sage and Stephen Kovacevich as well as in a flute and string quartet formation with Christoph Poppen (violin), Hariolf Schichtig (viola) and Jean-Guihen Queyras (cello) with whom he recorded his 1999 record Mozart Flute Quartets. In 1993, he co-founded Le festival de l'Empéri in Salon-de-Provence, France, along with his regular chamber music partners pianist Éric Le Sage (close friend and confidant) and Paul Meyer. In a French interview, Pahud describes the success of the festival as a project "filled with enthusiasm and fun" where the public has "recognised our work, our fellow artists, musicians and actors and have the desire to come back regularly." He also describes the festival as a "musical laboratory" which avoids the programming of works that the public are used to hearing in concert halls. It is about "daring to combine performers, works (music), create new collaborations and by taking risks. Pahud has made several recordings and performed internationally with pianist Éric Le Sage throughout his career. In 2008 he performed for the first time at the Jerusalem International Chamber Music Festival, where he played in the world premier of Elliott Carter's Flute Concerto, conducted by Daniel Barenboim. He returned to the Festival on 2009 to play in a series of concerts.

=== Musical styles and recordings ===
Pahud describes his versatility over the years in music, as transforming himself into a chameleon who tries to match the colour of the music, or the idea he has of it, to what the composer had in mind. But his discography and career have also been built on encounters—both professionally and in human relationships. He expresses in playing like a chameleon, "I try to change style, colour and phrasing, the way I breathe and articulate to suit the piece I am playing. I do not represent any particular national style." Pahud seems himself as a performer/actor rather than a composer/creator. For the Dalbavie Record (2008) Pahud dedicated himself to commissioning new works and to new flute concertos, performing them for the first time on stage. Three composers were selected: Marc-André Dalbavie (French), Michael Jarrell (Swiss), and Matthias Pintscher (German) reflecting Pahud as a French and Swiss citizen living in Germany for over 15 years. Whilst working with German Composer, Matthias Pintscher, Pahud sought to explore a new level and style of playing the flute. He recalls:

We spent some time talking about the effects and about the special way of using the instrument. The most interesting thing is how you interconnect these various effects [from an instrument] that is one of the oldest on earth. Whether you blow on it, in it, or you use it as a trumpet or a recorder, you can have a lot of different sounds on such an instrument. But that's nothing new about it, the new thing is how you can combine them and how you can get them to interconnect so that it becomes one musical statement, one phrase.

In March 2008 Pahud performed the world première of another work commissioned by Frank Michael Beyer, who composed Meridian, a Concerto for Flute & String Ensemble. Other world premières include music composed by Elliott Carter: Concerto for Flute & Ensemble, which Pahud premièred in September 2008 in Jerusalem. It was joint commissioned by the BPO, Jerusalem International Chamber Music Festival and Boston Symphony Orchestra. Pahud will world première the Flute Concerto by Luca Lombardi in 2010, commissioned by the Kansas City Symphony.

Though he is an enthusiastic consumer and commissioner of new music, Pahud sounds most excited when relishing the old repertoire. "Mastery of an instrument helps you to sense new barriers. This is where you keep music moving," and he acknowledges his various experiences with newer flute compositions as benefiting the way he performs his traditional repertoire. Pahud sees the future of interpretation (of music) will always be a blend of "tradition and novelty." But to him, this concept is not a novelty in itself. Many composers have evolved from traditions such as Bach for Fortepiano and Beethoven for the Hammerklavier. Pahud sees the term "tradition" as often being used to disguise the past, a lack of evolution or in denial of progress. But to him, the meaning of tradition is something evolving. He adds, "Artists such as Wilhelm Furtwängler, Herbert von Karajan, Claudio Abbado and Simon Rattle (conductors of BPO) were or are in line with tradition and make it evolve. In complete unconsciousness they feed from the past to define the future. That is one of the secrets of these great artists."

In most interviews, Pahud describes music/musical styles in terms of "phrasing" or a Phrase. In musical terms, this refers to "a musical unit, often a component of a melody. The phrase may be regarded as a dependent division of music, such as a single line of poetry; it does not have a sense of completion in itself. Usually two or more phrases balance each other." It is like a grammatical construction with words to stress. Musical phrasing is also expressed in terms of how the music is executed. In terms of style of the Dalbavie concerto itself, Pahud reflects how the flute finds a resonance within the orchestra whilst maintaining its virtuosic, colourful and sensual phrasing. In interpreting the poetic style of Jarrell, where the imagination of both the composer and of the audience are "immensely present," Pahud describes, "This is something to me I like a lot in music is exactly what you cannot express with words but that it's all there in the essence of the music." On reflecting the style of the famous flutist Jean-Pierre Rampal, "[Rampal] brought something new and unusual in terms of sound, class and grandeur of the expressive aspect of the flute. He was able to perform admirable phrases that never seemed to end, or how the breathing faded into the musical flow; and his ability to make the sound of the flute seem to extend endlessly, infinitely."

Pahud's debut into the world of jazz came through meeting and collaborating with jazz pianist Jacky Terrasson. He admires and derives inspiration from jazz flutists such as James Newton, James Moody, Herbie Mann, and Jeremy Steig. He has explored jazz further through performing big band music with friends and colleagues from the Berlin Philharmonic and local jazz musicians. Pahud's collaboration with Jacky Terrasson resulted in a duo CD titled "Into the Blue," with performances including original takes on Bolero, Apres un Reve, and the Bolling Suite among others. Other personnel on the project included Sean Smith and Ali Jackson (drums). Other examples of his vast interests in innovative musical genres include so-called "one-time projects" (as Pahud calls them); most recently in 2006, it included a collaboration project with the NHK Symphony Orchestra of a recorded original soundtrack for the NHK Taiga series Komyo ga Tsuji (Jp: 功名が辻).

For people that come to see Pahud perform, either jazz or classical, it is not only about entertaining. Pahud reflects on his audiences being able to learn about music at his performances; it is about reacting at different levels and ranges of emotions. To Pahud, it is about interacting, connecting and enabling the audience to think about what is happening as the music is being played. He wants to open opportunities in developing curiosity to discover more about music as a way of giving back to the audience.

In 1996, he signed an exclusive contract with EMI Classics, the only flutist in the world to have a solo recording contract with a major record company. Pahud is one of the significant contributors to the catalogue of recorded flute music today. Nowadays much of his time is taken up with recording. He extended his contract with EMI for a further six years. Recording adds a welcome diversity to Pahud's schedule:

I like to work for the mic – it brings a certain close-up on your playing. You have to take care of lots of things that you do not necessarily have to take care of when you are performing in a live concert hall. You don't have the emotional or the visual support, and you have to be exciting nevertheless. So at the same time you have to take greater care of the detail and bring a greater intensity to the music.

Pahud has recorded and/or collaborated a total of 24 discs for EMI.

=== Instrument ===
Pahud's first flute was a silver-plated Yamaha. His parents later bought him two Muramatsu Flutes, one half hand-made and the other fully hand-made. Pahud previously played on a 14-karat golden flute which he bought from Brannen Brothers in Boston, Massachusetts, in 1989 with money he won from competitions. Two weeks later he bought a head joint (the part into which the player blows) from Dana Sheridan, another Boston flute manufacturer. Pahud chose the Brannen flute body because it is one of the only flute makers that produce a decent Cooper scale, based on the scales developed by Albert Cooper. He describes his instrument:

This is the most flexible instrument I have tried so far. It enables me to transpose into music what I'm thinking and what I'm feeling. But, although the instrument is important, the player is the most important. All the work must be done before the mouth even makes contact with the instrument. It all happens by the way you hold your muscles, control your lungs, use the different cavities in the head and the upper body to let the sound resonate more or less.

Pahud now plays a solid 14-karat Haynes flute with a pinless mechanism, having previously played a solid 14-karat Brannen-Cooper flute with a Sheridan head joint from 1989 to 2012.

=== Personal life ===
Pahud has two sons, Grégoire and Tristan, from a former marriage.

== Repertoire ==
Flute and Symphony Orchestra

- Lennox Berkeley: Concerto op. 36
- Leonard Bernstein: Halil for Flute & Orchestra
- Ferruccio Busoni: Divertimento
- Aram Khatchaturian: Concerto
- György Ligeti: Double Concerto for Flute & Oboe
- Lorin Maazel: Music for Flute and Orchestra
- Carl Nielsen: Concerto
- Carl Reinecke: Concerto in D major op. 283
- Jacques Ibert: Concerto

Flute and Chamber Orchestra

- Theobald Boehm: Concerto in G major, op. 1
- Domenico Cimarosa: Concerto in G major for 2 flutes
- Franz Danzi: Sinfonia Concertante for Flute & Clarinet
- François Devienne: Concerto no. 2 in D major, and No. 7 in E minor
- Sofia Gubaidulina: Music for Flute, Strings and Percussions
- Michael Haydn: Concerto in D major
- Arthur Honegger: Double Concerto for Flute & Oboe
- Bernhard Molique Concerto in E minor
- Wolfgang Amadeus Mozart: Concerto in G major K313, Concerto in D major K314, Concerto for flute and harp K299, Andante in C major K315, Rondo in D major K184
- Carl Nielsen: Concerto
- Jacques Ibert: Concerto
- Jean Rivier: Concerto
- Erwin Schulhoff: Double Concerto for Flute & Piano
- Friedrich Schwindl: Concerto in D major
- Salvatore Sciarrino: Rondo
- Louis Spohr: Concerto no. 8 in a minor op. 47
- Carl Stamitz: Concerto in G major
- Mario Zafred: Concerto

Flute and Strings

- Carl Philipp Emanuel Bach: Concertos in D minor (H426), G major (H445), A major (H438) and B flat major (H435)
- Johann Sebastian Bach: Concerto in A minor BWV 1056, Suite no. 2 in B minor BWV 1067, Brandenburg Concertos nos 4 and 5, Triple concerto BWV 1044
- Luigi Boccherini: Concerto in D major op. 27
- André Grétry: Concerto in C major
- Joseph Haydn Concerto in D major
- André Jolivet: Concerto
- Jean-Marie Leclair: Concerto in C major no.3 op. 7
- Saverio Mercadante: Concerto in E minor
- Giovanni Battista Pergolesi: Concertos in G major and D major
- Ignaz Pleyel: Concerto in C major
- Johann Joachim Quantz: Concertos in G major, D major, C minor, E minor
- Georg Philipp Telemann: Concertos in F major and G major
- Antonio Vivaldi: Concerti: Four Seasons, Piccolo concerto

== Awards and recognition ==
- 2014: ECHO Klassik, Germany
- March 2013: "Diapason d'Or" magazine, France
- 2013: Nominated at the TV Awards Victoires de la Musique, France
- 2012: Classica Magazine Choc of the Year, France
- 2012: Record Academy Award, Japan
- 2009: Awarded the French Order of Arts and Literature (Ordre des Arts et des Lettres) presented by Ambassador Bernard de Montferrand for contribution to French music.
- 2006: Lucerne Festival honoured him with the highest distinction of "Artiste Étoile".
- February 1998: "Instrumentalist of the Year 1997" at the prestigious Victoires de la Musique award ceremony in Paris.
- 1998–99: Pahud's second EMI disc, Paris (1998) containing French flute music, in collaboration with Le Sage, won the Diapason d'Or award.
- 1997–98: Pahud's first EMI disc, Mozart Flute Concertos and the Concerto for Flute and Harp (1997) won the Diapason "CD of the Year" award, the Radio France listeners' poll as favourite recording of the year, the Japanese Geijutsu Award, and a Fono-Forum award.
- October 1992: Hand-picked by Claudio Abbado to be principal flautist of Berlin Philharmonic Orchestra.
- September 1992: Pahud won eight out of the twelve special prizes at the Concours de Genève.
- 1989: Won first prize at the Kobe International Flute Competition.
- 1988: Won first prize at the Duino International Music Competition.
- 1988: Won second prize at the International Scheveningen Music Competition.
- 1985: Won first prize at the National Competition of Belgium (le concours National de Belgique)
- Soloists Prize in the Worldwide French-speaking Community Radio Awards.
- Awarded a total of four TV-Echo awards in Germany.
- "Ongaku no Tomo" award from the Japanese record industry.
- Awarded European Council's Juventus Prize.
- Pahud is also a laureate of the Yehudi Menuhin Foundation and of the International Tribune for Musicians of UNESCO.

== Discography ==
On EMI Classics

- The Flute King (2011)
- Fantasy: A Night at the Opera (2010)
- Opium- Mélodies françaises (2009)
- Bach Flute & Harpsichord Sonatas (2008)
- Dalbavie: Flute Concerto (2008)
- Brahms: Sonatas Op.120, No.1 & No.2 and Reinecke Sonata Op.167 (2007)
- Nielsen: Clarinet & Flute Concertos, Wind Quintet with Sabine Meyer, BPO (2007)
- Vivaldi: Flute Concertos with Australian Chamber Orchestra (2006)
- Haydn: Flute Concertos etc. (2005)
- French Connection: Chamber Works (2005)
- Beau Soir with Mariko Anraku (2004)
- Le Carnaval des animaux (2004)
- Khachaturian/Ibert Flute Concertos with Tonhalle-Orchester Zürich (2003)
- Into the Blue with Jacky Terrasson (2003)
- Telemann Concertos (2003)
- Gubaidulina: The Canticle of the Sun- Music for Flute, Strings and Percussion (2001)
- Mozart: Flute/Flute & Harp & Clarinet Concerti with Sabine Meyer (2001)
- Bach: Brandenburg Concerto No.5 etc. with Berliner Barock Solisten (2001)
- Debussy/Ravel/Prokofiev (2000)
- Mozart: Quartets for Flute, Violin, Viola & Cello (1999)
- Haydn: Flute Concertos with Haydn Ensemble Berlin (1998)
- Cantos y Danzas with Manuel Barrueco (1998)
- Paris- French Flute Music with Eric Le Sage (1998)
- Mozart: Flute Concertos with BPO (1997)

On Auvidis Valois

- Weber: Sonatas for flute and piano with Eric Le Sage (1995)
- Schubert: Introduction and Variations D.802, Sonata D.821, Sonatine D.385 with Eric Le Sage (1994)
- Beethoven: Sonata in B flat major, Sonata in F major op. 17, Serenade in D op.41 with Eric Le Sage (1993)

On Musiques Suisses

- Flötenmusik (1995)
