= Lamberson =

Lamberson is a surname. Notable people with the surname include:

- Greg Lamberson (born 1964), American filmmaker and author
- Jay G. Lamberson (1846–1927), American politician, member of the Wisconsin State Assembly
- Josh Lamberson (born 1982), American football coach and former player
- Tip Lamberson (1922–2005), AKA "N.D. Lamberson", premier American flute maker
- Josiah Lamberson Parrish (1806–1895), American missionary in the Pacific Northwest

== See also ==
- Jack Lamberson House, AKA the Maunu house, a historic residence in Oskaloosa, Iowa, United States
- Lambertson
