= Nirschl =

Maker of musical instruments

Nirschl, also known by the owner's name, Walter Nirschl, is a German company that builds musical instruments. Nirschl is a sixth-generation builder of musical instruments. Nirschl builds brass instruments, including trumpets, trombones, French horns, mellophones, euphoniums, and tubas, under the 'Meister Walter Nirschl' brand in his factory in Bavaria and collaborates with Gemstone Musical Instruments on the W. Nirschl brass line. Nirschl's instruments are played in some of the finest orchestras in the world.

Nirschl's great-great-great-great-grandfather started making harmonicas and later brass instruments in central Graslitz, Bohemia in 1810. His grandfather, Wenzel Meinl, set up a music shop in Geretsried in 1945, and Walter later trained at the shop with his uncle Anton Meinl. After learning the business in his uncle's factory, Nirschl apprenticed at other factories, including American and French shops. Eventually he purchased the Böhm & Meinl Symphonic, a brass instrument company in Geretsried, which at the time was the only company in the world making large bore piston tubas in the size and style of the great American York tubas.

Carl Fischer, a music publisher who then owned the York name, sold "York Master" instruments that were designed to be visually and functionally similar to the American designs, but were made in Germany on completely different tooling by Böem & Meinl.

In 2002, Nirschl was hired by a company in the United Kingdom to modernize a factory in India, and used his company in Geretsried to build prototypes. After significant investment, the financial backers decided to get out of the music business, which left the Indian factory dormant. Gemstone Musical Instruments recognized the opportunity and partnered with Nirschl, which combined the 60 year sales and marketing traditions of the Gemeinhardt Company with the six generations of German instrument craftsmanship. A full line of 'W. Nirschl' brass instruments is now produced in China, Brazil and India.

== See also ==
- Arnold Jacobs
