= Marti Epstein =

American composer (born 1959)

Marti Epstein (born November 25, 1959) is an American composer. She is Professor of Composition at Berklee College of Music and the Boston Conservatory at Berklee.

== Education ==
Epstein was born in Denver, Colorado in 1959, and grew up in Omaha, Nebraska and attended Omaha Burke High School, graduating with the class of 1978.

She began composition studies in 1977 while still in high school with Professor Robert Beadell at the University of Nebraska–Lincoln. She earned degrees from the University of Colorado (Bachelor of Music in Composition, summa cum laude, 1982) and Boston University (Master of Music in Composition, 1984; Doctor of Musical Arts in Composition, 1989). Her principal composition instructors were Charles Eakin, Joyce Mekeel, and Bernard Rands.

== Career ==
Dr. Epstein has received numerous awards and commissions. In April 2020, she was awarded a Guggenheim Fellowship for music composition. She was a fellow at the MacDowell Colony and twice a fellow in composition at the Tanglewood Music Center, where she worked with Oliver Knussen and Hans Werner Henze. Composition prizes include a Massachusetts Cultural Council Grant, Fromm Foundation Commission, Lee Ettleson Composition Prize Bay Area Women's Philharmonic Composition Prize, and Friends and Enemies of New Music Composition She has received commissions from ALEA III, Sequitur New Music Ensemble, the Fromm Foundation, guitarist David Tanenbaum, the American Dance Festival the CORE Ensemble, the A*DEvantgarde Festival of Munich, tubist Samuel Pilafian, flutist Marianne Gedigian, the New England Brass Quintet, the Iowa Brass Quintet, Boston Conservatory, Boston University Marsh Chapel Choir, pianist Kathleen Supove, the Massachusetts Music Teachers Association, the Foxborough Musical Association, pianist Paul Carlson, the CrossSound New Music Festival of Juneau Alaska the Seattle Trumpet Consort and the Pro Arte Chamber Orchestra of Boston.

Her music has been performed in Europe and America by ensembles such as the San Francisco Symphony, the Radio Symphony Orchestra of Frankfurt, the Atlantic Brass Quintet, and Ensemble Modern. In 1992 she was invited by the City of Munich to compose her puppet opera, Hero und Leander, for the 1992 Munich Biennale for New Music Theater.

Dr Epstein's work for piano, Waterbowls, has been described as "a luminous study in quiet sonorities and the ache of memory". Writing for The Boston Globe, David Weininger writes Epsteins's music "has the feel of suspension in space, fragile and almost static..." The International Trumpet Guild Journal comments on her exploration of color in the Two Canons for Seven Natural Trumpets.

== Discography ==
- Two Canons, Seattle Trumpet Consort: 2008
- Doloroso, Apostolos Parskevas: 2006.
- She Fell Into a Well of Sorrows, Kathleen Supove: 2003
- The Five Chairs, Atlantic Brass Quintet: 2003. Summit Records DCD 396
- The Parting Glass, Ulf Golnast: 1997.
- The Five Chairs, Iowa Brass Quintet: 1997.
- Waterbowls, Kathleen Supové: 1993.
- Hypnagogia, Ludovico Ensemble: 2015

== Selected works ==
=== Orchestral ===
- Twylle [1999]; chamber orchestra; 6'
- Print [1998]; orchestra; 11'
- Concerto Grosso for Cello, Double Bass and String Orchestra [1997]; 9'
- Celestial Navigation [1988]; orchestra; 14'

=== Choral ===
- Weather Patterns [2009]; SSATB chorus and cello
- The Streets of Laredo [2000]; 3 tenor soloists, SSAAB choir, 7'
- The Radiant Sisters [1995]; women's choir and chamber orchestra; 14'
- Flower World; 3 poems from the Yaqui Deer Dance [1992]; chorus and chamber ensemble; 13'

=== Large ensemble ===
- Bloom [2009]; English horn and wind ensemble; 17'.
- Color Wheel [2005]; concert band; 3'
- Chant [2001]; large ensemble, 13'
- Victoria's Secret [1997]; 2 cellos, 2 double basses, 2 pianos; 9'
- Kinderfarben [1988]; chamber ensemble; 12'

=== Brass ===
- The View from my Window [2009]; 6'
- Three Canons for Seven Trumpets [2007]; 6'
- L'homme armé [2005]; brass quintet; 15'
- The Five Chairs [1990]; brass quintet; 7'
- Albion Moonlight [1987]; brass quintet; 10'

=== Woodwind ===
- Quartet [2007]; English horn and string trio; 7'
- Six Little Pieces for Woodwind Quintent [2004]; 6'
- Ophelia [2003]; solo flute, 3'
- Thalia [1998]; oboe d'amore and digital delay; 11'
- Bluff [1997]; saxophone quartet; 7'
- Fold [1996]; oboe, clarinet; bassoon; 8'
- And [1995]; flute and piano; 17'

=== String ===
- Chords of Inquiry [2006]; cello quartet, 17'
- Temblor [2000]; solo violin, 13'
- Vermilion [2000]; violin and piano, 3'
- Barcarolle [1999]; string trio, 13'
- The Porcelain Tower of Nanking [1998]; violin and guitar; 4'
- Puella Turbata [1997]; string quartet; 13'
- Lazy Susan [1997]; cello and piano; 11'
- Swirl [1994]; viola, cello, and piano; 13'
- Endgame II [1987]; double bass; 8'
- Blue Lines [1987]; string quartet; 9'
- Endgame [1985]; solo violin, 7'
- Microscopes IV [1984]; violin, cello, and piano; 8'
- Phosphenes [2017]; string quartet; 4'
- Hidden Flowers [2012]; string quartet; 21'

=== Mixed ensemble ===
- Liquid, Fragile [2010]; clarinet, violin, viola, and cello; 12'
- Hypnagogia [2009]; oboe, clarinet, violin, cello, harp, piano, and cimbalom; 57'
- Unraveling [2009]; flute, violin, viola, cello, harp
- Quartet [2007]; English horn, violin, viola, cello, 7'
- Strange Little Moon [2007]; 2 pianos, 2 harps, 25'
- Angel of Memory [2003]; cello, piano, and percussion, 13'
- Cadence [2003]; violin, piano, and marimba, 5';
- In Soft Repose Let his Sweet Eyelids Close [2002]; flute, violin, and cello, 6'
- Lux [2002]; flute, violin, viola, and euphonium, 8'
- See, Even Night [2001]; clarinet, viola, and piano, 21'
- Concerto for Cello and Chamber Ensemble [1994]; solo cello, 4 cellos, 2 violins, 2 pianos- 8 hands; 3 marimbists; 3 percussionists; 8'
- Private Fantasy Booth [1993]; flute, clarinet, piano, marimba, violin, and cello; 12'
- Parasol [1992]; piccolo, English horn, cello; 8'
- The Reason for Skylarks [1990]; flute, clarinet, piano, xylophone; 6'
- Grand Island [1986]; piano, harp, 2 percussion; 17'
- April 1987 [2017]; baritone saxophone and double bass; 7'
- Abraham Lincoln's Mystic Chords of Memory [2016]; bass clarinet, bassoon, piano; 4'
- Oil & Sugar [2016]; flute, clarinet, violin, piano; 8'30"

=== Piano ===
- The Piano at the Palace Beautiful [2019]; 13'
- Haven [2006]; 17'
- American Etudes [1991-2005]; solo piano
- Hothouse [2000]; piano 4 hands; 7'
- She Fell into a Well of Sorrows [1999]; piano and digital effects processor; 9'
- Chimera [1999]; 2 pianos; 13'
- Aqua Marine [1995]; piano; 3'
- Marie's Waltz [1994]; piano; 5'
- Voices in Empty Rooms [1993]; piano; 7'
- Queen of the Night [1992]; piano; 17'
- Waterbowls [1989]; piano; 9'

=== Vocal ===
- Different Kinds of Light
- I Baci [2001]; soprano, mezzo-soprano, and harpsichord, 9'
- Superstition [1999]; soprano, 2 clarinets, viola, and cello, 5
- Lenz [1999]; baritone voice and piano, 7'
- Trapeze [1999]; mezzo-soprano, clarinet, viola, and piano, 17'
- Klänge (text by Wassily Kandinsky) [1993]; soprano; 13'
- Bassoon (text by Wassily Kandinsky) [1991]; soprano, double bass, piano; 8'
- Birth (text by Faye Kicknosway) [1990]; mezzo-soprano, bassoon, marimba, violin; 10'
- Eleven Basho Haiku (text by Basho) [1989]; soprano and piano; 13'
- December 14 [1983]; mezzo-soprano, alto flute, cello, and piano; 8'.

=== Guitar ===
- Doloroso [2004]; guitar; 7'
- Petals [1998]; guitar; 12'
- The Parting Glass [1989]; guitar; 12'
- For Guitars and Cello [1988]; 4 guitars and cello; 9'

=== Harp ===
- Wonder of the Invisible World [2016]; harp; 13'
- John Dunstable's Harp [1991]; harp; 9'

=== Percussion ===
- Ring [2001]; solo percussionist, 6'
- Gong [2000]; percussion quartet, 6'

=== Dramatic works ===
- Rumpelstilzchen : a chamber opera in one act [2008]; 56'
- Permantent Absence [1995]; dance; violin, cello, piano, and percussion; 31' (in collaboration with choreographer Kumiko Kimoto)
- Hero und Leander [1991]; puppet theater; violin, viola; and cello; 30' (in collaboration with Marcus Schneider for the 1992 Munich Biennale
