= Paul de Wailly =

French composer

Paul Louis Auguste Warnier de Wailly (May 16, 1854 – June 18, 1933) was a French composer.

== Life ==
Paul de Wailly grew up in Château de Bagatelle in Abbeville. He lost his father, a naval officer, when he was seven. He started composing at the age of 17 and became a student of César Franck at the Paris Conservatoire. In 1900, he married Marthe de Maricourt (1870–1918).

At the beginning of the 20th century, de Wailly held regular concerts at Château de Bagatelle. During the First World War, he took over the administration of the Abbeville Hospital. In 1921, along with Albert Laurent (1885–1978), he founded the "Society of Friends of Music" in Abbeville to present lectures and organize concerts.

De Wailly created orchestral works (including several symphonies), chamber music (including a piano quintet in F minor, op. 15 from 1895), organ works, and vocal compositions. The majority of his compositions display characteristics of the late romantic tradition of César Franck. Firmly devoted to absolute music in the classical style, he opposed contemporary trends at the beginning of the 20th century. However, he still maintained friendships with modern composers, including Erik Satie, who he supported for a time.

Most of de Wailly's works were composed between 1870-1900 and published in Paris between 1892 and 1930. However, on the eve of the World War I, his oratorio, L'Apôtre (The Apostle), was performed at the Théâtre des Champs-Elysees on December 19, 23 and 28, 1924, but public reception was lukewarm. With the exception of performances at the Société Nationale de Musique (National Music Society), de Wailly's music did not achieve great success outside appreciation outside a small circle of friends. However, he received a favorable review stating that he was "heavily applauded" at a performance of two chansons with orchestra in 1911.

Additionally, the Aubade for flute, oboe, and clarinet was given a positive reception when it was premiered by the Société moderne d'instruments à vent in Paris on March 7, 1902, with noted flutist Georges Barrère.

== Death ==
De Wailly died in 1933.

== Selected works ==
=== Instrumental ===
- Cello Sonata in D major (ca. 1879)
- Chanson (1878), possibly including Toujours, Chanson, and Li-taï-pé.
- Serenade for Flute and Strings, Op.25 (ca. 1887)
- Piano Quintet in F minor, op. 15 (1895)
- Aubade (1901, published 1906), for flute, oboe, and clarinet
- 6 Pieces for Two Violins and Cello (ca. 1919)
- Wind Octet in E-flat major, Op. 22 (ca.1929) for flute, oboe, 2 clarinets, trumpet in C, horn, 2 bassoons
- Sous un balcon, serenade for chamber orchestra

=== For voice ===
- Trois mélodies pour une voix avec accompagnement de piano, Op. 5 (1878)
1. Toujours
2. Chanson
3. Li-taï-pé
- Deux mélodies avec orchestre
1. Au Vaisseau
2. Sous un berceau de clématite

=== For solo piano ===
- Prélude
- Tribute
- Mazurka
- Au bord de la mer
- Vieux souvenirs
- Capriceio
- In Hongrie (I et II)
- Incertitude

=== Other works ===
- L'Apôtre (The Apostle), (1924)
- Hilas, idylle antique, parole de Jean Lorrain
- Cantiques et chants divers en l'honneur de Saint Gilles (1896)
