= Ruth Freeman Gudeman =

American flutist and teacher

Ruth Freeman Gudeman (February 18, 1915 – April 20, 2003) was an American flutist and teacher. She is credited as the first woman to give a major solo recital in New York City at Town Hall. She received a Bachelor of Music degree from the Oberlin Conservatory and held a fellowship at the Juilliard School of Music, where she studied with George Barrère over a fourteen-year period. Italian flutist and educator Leonardo de Lorenzo called her "one of America's finest flutists."

Freeman held faculty positions at the Juilliard School and the Mannes School of Music, while holding orchestral and chamber positions with the National Orchestra Association, Musica Aeterna Orchestra, Manhattan Symphonic "Seven Men and a Girl" Ensemble the Chautauqua Symphony, American Opera Society Orchestra, Salzedo Concert Ensemble, and New York Concert Trio. With these ensembles, she toured throughout the United States, Canada, Bermuda, Puerto Rico and Cuba. She was a founder of the Long Island Junior Flute Club. She appeared as a soloist at Town Hall and Carnegie Hall in New York City with "outstanding success." Additionally, she gave premieres of works including Marion Eugenie Bauer's Prelude and Fugue, Opus 43 with Chautauqua Symphony, under the baton of Franco Autori and Quintet for Flute and String Quartet by Walter Piston. She was interviewed and cited in Nancy Toff's book about the life of George Barrère as one of his students.

In 1977, Gudeman retired from her positions at Juilliard and Mannes, and moved to Florida with her husband. She formed the Family Trio with her sister, violist Betty Haines and son, Ralph Gudeman. This group performed frequently throughout New York and Florida. She died in 2003 at age 88.
