= Dana Sheridan =

Dana Sheridan is an American flute maker and master craftsman known for his handcrafted flutes and especially his flute headjoints. Additionally, his flutes are noted for their "old-world craftsmanship and precise work." Originally from the United States, Sheridan now lives and works in Cologne, Germany while maintaining another shop in Boston, Massachusetts. His head joints are noted for their combination of "American innovation and German precision." Sheridan headjoints are very popular among high-level flute players. Sheridan recently partnered with Gemstone Musical Instruments to create a headjoint for the Brio! line of premium step-up and semi-professional flutes.

== Biography ==
Dana Sheridan began to manufacture his own flutes in 1972, after graduation from Boston's Berklee School. After receiving a degree in music composition from that school, he worked with prominent flute manufacturers William S. Haynes, Verne Q. Powell and Brannen Brothers, before creating his own flute manufacturing company in 1982. Since that time, he has maintained workshops in Germany and Boston.

== See also ==
- List of flute makers
