= Trevor Hutton =

Trevor Hutton may refer to:

- Trevor Hutton (American football)
- Trevor Hutton (flute maker)
