= Amy Porter =

Amy Porter may refer to:

- Amy Porter (flutist), American flutist and pedagogue
- Amy Porter (Waterloo Road), a character in the TV series Waterloo Road
