= Powell Flutes =

American producer of flutes and piccolos

Verne Q. Powell Flutes Inc.
- Industry: Musical instrument manufacturing
- Founded: 1927; 99 years ago in Boston, Massachusetts, United States
- Founder: Verne Q. Powell
- Headquarters: Maynard, Massachusetts, United States
- Website: powellflutes.com

Verne Q. Powell Flutes Inc. is a producer of professional flutes and piccolos since 1927. The company, located in Maynard, Massachusetts, produces handmade musical instruments in wood, silver, platinum, and gold. In 2016, Powell Flutes was purchased by Buffet Crampon, a French manufacturer of wind instruments.

== History ==
=== Verne Q. Powell ===
Verne Q. Powell (b. 7 Apr 1879 Danville, Indiana; d Feb 3, 1968 Needham, Massachusetts) started playing flute as a young boy in Kansas. His family were all musicians, but their trade was silversmithing. Verne was always encouraged to enjoy music, but he was trained by his family in jewelry making and engraving. In 1910, Verne visited Chicago to attend a recital by renowned flutist Georges Barrère. Barrère was performing on a silver flute, something Verne had never heard before. Verne was impressed with the sound, and set out to make a silver flute for himself.

Verne melted down various bits of silver (including a "handful of silver half-dollars," 7 spoons and 3 watch cases) to create the parts of the now famous "spoon flute." Upon completing the instrument Verne began performing on it regularly. In a short time, William S. Haynes, owner of the Wm. S. Haynes Flute Company of Boston, Massachusetts, heard of Powell's instrument and asked to see it. Upon review, he offered Verne a job at his shop.

In 1916, Verne Powell joined the Wm. S. Haynes Company to make wooden flutes and piccolos. By 1926, Powell was the shop foreman at Haynes and was running much of the business. Later that year, he left Haynes to make his own flutes. In 1927, Verne Q. Powell Flutes, Inc. was incorporated at 295 Huntington Avenue in Boston, Massachusetts.

==== Powell Flutes Company ====
In 1961, Powell sold his company to four employees. He retired in early 1962, at age 82. The group of four ran the company until 1984 when two employees, Jim Phelan and Rob Viola, became the owners. In 1986, Steven Wasser bought the shares belonging to Viola and gained controlling ownership. Phelan left the company in 1989 to pursue other interests, and Wasser became the full owner.

The company moved from Boston to Arlington in 1970, to Waltham in 1989, and then Maynard in 1999. On March 31, 2016, Steven Wasser sold Powell Flutes to Buffet Crampon, a French manufacturer of wind instruments. The company shop is located in a historic mill building complex in Maynard, Massachusetts, where it employs approximately 50 staff.

=== Famous customers and famous flutes ===
- Eric Dolphy in the band of Charlie Mingus & John Coltrane
- Ian Anderson of Jethro Tull
- Colonel Catherine "Cady" Coleman, astronaut
- William Kincaid, "father of the American flute school"

A platinum flute with sterling silver mechanism was commissioned for the 1939 World's Fair, in New York. This flute was owned and played by the famous flutist William Kincaid until shortly before his death in 1967. In 1986 this flute was auctioned by Christie's for $170,000 plus $17,000 for the auction house fee, the highest price ever paid for a flute. The same flute was again put up for auction at Christie's in 2009 and sold for $37,500.

=== Sonaré Winds ===
In 2002, Powell Flutes created a division called Sonaré Winds. Sonaré President David Kilkenny and Powell President Steve Wasser created the business plan, and launched the product in August 2002 at the NFA show in Washington DC. The flute grew to the #1 position in the market within short order. The handmade headjoint of the Sonaré flute is used to generate the "Powell sound," while the process used in production of the body avoids the high cost of a handmade Powell instrument.

In 2005, Sonare President David Kilkenny and Brass Expert Jim Becker created a line of trumpets with partner Cliff Blackburn. The trumpets were originally made in Germany (later moved to Elkhart, Indiana by the E.K. Blessing Co.) and have a [leadpipe] and mouthpiece made by Cliff Blackburn.
