= Density 21.5 =

1946 composition for solo flute by Edgard Varèse

Density 21.5 is a composition for solo flute written by Edgard Varèse in 1936 and revised in 1946. The piece was composed at the request of Georges Barrère for the premiere of his platinum flute, (Note: The flute was a 90/10 platinum-iridium alloy with a density of about 21.6 grams per cubic centimetre. It cost US$3,750 in 1935, about US$65,000 in 2014 dollars. The flute was manufactured by Haynes Flutes. See Anon. 1941, Anon. 2018, and US CPI Inflation Calculator Archived 2016-03-04 at the Wayback Machine) the density of platinum being close to 21.5 grams per cubic centimetre.

== Structure ==
AllMusic's Sean Hickey writes, "According to the composer, Density 21.5 is based on two melodic ideas—one modal, one atonal—and all of the subsequent material is generated from these two themes. Despite the inherent limitations of writing for an unaccompanied melodic instrument, Varèse expertly explores new areas of space and time, utilizing registral contrasts to effect polyphonic continuity."

George Perle analyses the piece both harmonically and motivically, and describes its background structure. Formally, he says, the piece consists of two parts of nearly equal length, the end of the first section being bars 24–28. The piece uses interval cycles, "inherently non-diatonic symmetrical elements". The opening ten bars outline a tritone, C♯–G, itself further divided into minor thirds (by E) with the upper minor third differentiated by a passing tone, F♯, that is lacking in the lower minor third. Thus the diminished seventh chord, or rather C3_{1}, interval cycle, partitions the octave, and "places Varèse with Scriabin and the Schoenberg circle among the revolutionary composers whose work initiates the beginning of a new mainstream tradition in the music of our century".

He continues: "the concept of the perfect fourth or fifth as a referential interval relative to which the tritone requires resolution ... has no relevance at all to Density 21.5". However, there still is a reference point, first in the differentiated minor third, C♯–(E–F♯–G)–B♭. The second tritone, created by C3_{1}, E–B♭, C6_{4}, is hierarchically related to the C♯–G tritone, C6_{1}. Thus regristral placement is taken into consideration, creating pitches rather than pitch classes. "My reason for stressing this hierchical distinction between C6_{1}, and C6_{4} is that there is a constant shifting of such distinctions, a constant reinterpretation of structural notes as passing notes and vice versa, and it is through this ambiguity, this perpetual change of function, that the composition unfolds. This is what the composition is about".

The piece proceeds to outline new tritones, D–G♯, D♯–A, and then pauses, in measures 13–14, B♭–E, which is part of C3, "right back where he had started", however, "the relation between the two tritones of C3_{1} becomes not less but more ambiguous". He sees the close of the first section as the attainment of the e–c♯ missing from the E–G of bars 13–17. However, the B which divides G♯–D require an F, "if we assume that the G♯–B–D collection represents an incomplete diminished-seventh chord, that the work is based on structural relations derived from the interval-3 cycle, and that this implies a tendency for each partition of the cycle to be completely represented".

From the second beat of bar 56 until the end, however, the piece uses an interval-2 cycle, C2, which still produces tritones, but partitions them differently. E–B♭ is paired with D–(G♯) and C–F♯, rather than C♯–G. The only odd interval (outside the interval-2 cycle) is the F♯–C♯, "which transfers us from C2_{0} to C2_{1}. And here, in the last two notes of Density 21.5 we at last find B paired with its tritone associate ... only as a consequence of an entirely new harmonic direction that the work takes in its closing bars." However, "the music of the 'common practice' offers many exemplars of such altogether unexpected digressions just as a work is drawing to its close, followed by a return, for the final cadence, to a consequently more emphatic confirmation of the structural relations implied in the body of the work."

In the foreground, the head motif, presumably Varèse's atonal "idea", does not contain a minor third or tritone, and thus each pitch, F–E–F♯, is a member of a different interval-3 cycle or diminished-seventh chord. The structural importance of each pitch is then dependent on its context, at which level it partitions the octave, the tritone which divides the octave, the minor third which divides the tritone, the major second which divides the major third, the minor second which divides the major second. "This variable relation of the basic motive of Density 21.5 to the harmonic structure of the piece, and its function in articulating and clarifying the formal design, are exactly what we would expect and take for granted in the relation between motive and background in traditional tonal music."

Defined by the head motif and its repetition in bar 3, is "characterized by its relative pitch content (a three-note segment of the semitonal scale), by its interval order—down a half step and up a whole step—and by its rhythm (two sixteenth-notes on the beat followed by a tied eighth-note). This definitive version of the motive, combining all three attributes, occurs at only three different points (not counting the repetition in bar 3), each initiating a new and major formal subdivision of the piece."

Three complete motif occurrences, measures marked above

Timothy Kloth interprets the head motif or, "the molecular structure around which the entire composition is cast," as being the five-pitch-class motive which opens the piece, F–E–F♯–C♯–G. This is divided into two trichords: "cell X" (also Perle's head motif, F–E–F♯) and "cell Y", F–C♯–G.

== Recordings ==
George Perle and Marc Wilkinson, in writing, and Harvey Sollberger, in recording, all interpret the fourth note in bar twenty-three as a B natural.

The piece has been recorded and released on:

- Members of the Columbia Symphony Orchestra, directed by Robert Craft – Varèse: Density 21.5, Hyperprism, Intégrales, Ionisation, Octandre, Poème Electronique (1959) CBS Masterworks – CBS 60286.
- Severino Gazelloni, flute (1967) WERGO WER 60029, Series: Große Interpreten neuer Musik.
- Ensemble Instrumental de Musique Contemporaine de Paris, directed by Konstantin Simonovitch – Varese: Deserts / Hyperprism / Integrales / Density 21.5 (1971) La Voix De Son Maître 2 C 061-10875 Y.
- Edgard Varèse: The Complete Works (1994/1998). Performed by Jacques Zoon. Decca London Polygram 289 460 208–2. Assistance and advised from Professor Chou Wen-chung, who worked closely with Varèse.
- Harvey Sollberger
- Philippe Bernold, Alexandre Tharaud, The Solo Flute in the 20th Century (2008), Harmonia Mundi Musique d'Abord HMA1951710
- Claire Chase, Density (2013) New Focus Recordings

== Notes and references ==
Notes

Sources

- Anon. (May 6, 1941). "Platinum Flute at $3,750 Best, Barrere Finds". The Milwaukee Journal.
- Anon (2018). "Georges Barrère: NYFC President 1920–1944" The New York Flute Club, Inc. website (accessed December 14, 2018).
- Chou, Wen-chung (1994). Edgard Varèse: The Complete Works (Media notes). Jacques Zoon. Decca London Polygram. 289 460 208–2.
- Hickey, Sean. Edgard Varèse: Density 21.5, for Flute Solo" at AllMusic
- Kloth, Timothy (1991). "Structural Hierarchy in Two Works of Edgard Varèse: Écuatorial and Density 21.5". Contemporary Music Forum. 3.
- Perle, George (1990). The Listening Composer. University of California Press. ISBN 0-520-06991-9.
- Walls, Seth Colter (2013). "Flutist Claire Chase Has Breath and Breadth in Density". Q2 Music Featured Album: WQXR website (October 14; accessed December 14, 2018).
- Wilkinson, Marc (1957). "An Introduction to the Music of Edgard Varèse". The Score and I.M.A. Magazine. 19 (17).
