= Sharon Bezaly =

Israeli flutist (born 1972)

- שרון בצלי
- Born: 1972 (age 52–53); Israel
- Occupation: Musician
- Years active: 1997–present

Sharon Bezaly (Hebrew: שרון בצלי; born 1972) is an Israeli flautist.

Bezaly was born in Israel, but lives presently in Sweden. She has been an international performer since 1997, when she began her solo flute career. She made her solo debut at 13 with Zubin Mehta and the Israel Philharmonic. Her flute was made by Muramatsu Flutes out of 24-carat gold.

== Appearances ==
Sharon Bezaly has appeared with leading symphony and chamber orchestras in Japan, China, Israel, Central and Western Europe, England, North and South America, Australia and Scandinavia. She has also performed at venues including the Vienna Musikverein, Châtelet in Paris, Tokyo's Suntory Hall, and at festivals with Gidon Kremer of the Bartók Quartet. In May 2006, she appeared at Orchestra Hall (Minneapolis) with Osmo Vänskä and the Minnesota Orchestra.

== Dedicated works ==
=== Concertante ===
- Kalevi Aho: Concerto for flute (+alto) and orchestra
- Sally Beamish: Concerto for flute and orchestra
- Daniel Börtz: Concerto for flute and orchestra
- Brett Dean: Concerto for flute and orchestra
- Sofia Gubaidulina: Concerto for flute (+alto, +bass) and orchestra
- Anders Hillborg: Concerto for flute and orchestra
- Christian Lindberg: Concerto for flute (+alto) and chamber orchestra with solo glockenspiel
- Uljas Pulkkis: Concerto for flute and orchestra
- Ge Gan-ru: Concerto for flute and orchestra
- Mari Takano: Concerto for flute and string orchestra
- Haukur Tómasson: Concerto for flute and orchestra No.2
- Zhou Long: Deep, Deep Sea for alto flute, piccolo and orchestra
- Zhou Long: Concerto for flute and orchestra

=== Solo ===
- Daniel Börtz: Tinted Drawings
- Fulvio Caldini: Bezaly Sonatine
- Brett Dean: Demons
- Carl-Axel Dominique: Songlines
- George Flynn: Attitudes
- Hans-Ola Ericsson: Schattenengel

== Discography ==
Bezaly has released 24 award-winning CDs with the Swedish record company BIS. She is married to the owner Robert von Bahr.

Complete discography:

- Pipe Dreams Aug 12 · 1789
- LigAlien – Music by Mari Takano Dec 11 · CD-1453
- Across the Sea – Chinese-American Flute Concertos Oct 11 · CD-1739
- Beamish – Orchestral Works Jul 10 · CD-1601
- Masterworks for Flute and Piano II May 10 · SACD-1729
- Sharon Bezaly plays Bacri, Bernstein, Dean & Rouse Feb 10 · CD-1799
- Nicolas Bacri – Sturm und Drang Sep 09 · CD-1579
- Christopher Rouse – Orchestral Music II Sep 09 · CD-1586
- Brett Dean – Water Music Jul 09 · CD-1576
- Schnittke – Concerto grosso No.1 & Symphony No.9
- Remembrance May 9 · CD-1650
- Whirling Dance – Works for Flute and Traditional Chinese Orchestra Mar 09 · * SACD-1759
- Spellbound - Sharon Bezaly Oct 08 · CD-1649
- Barocking together Jul 08 · CD-1689
- Mozart - Complete Works for Flute and Orchestra Feb 08 · SACD-1539
- French Delights Oct 07 · SACD-1639
- Haukur Tómasson – Concertos Jun 07 · CD-1419
- Uljas Pulkkis - Enchanted Garden May 7 · SACD-1339
- Seascapes Apr 07 · SACD-1447
- Bridge across the Pyrenees - Flute Concertos
- Gubaidulina - ... The Deceitful Face of Hope and Despair Mar 06 · SACD-1449
- Bezaly and Brautigam - Masterworks for Flute and Piano Jan 06 · SACD-1429
- Nordic Spell - Concertos for Flute and Orchestra May 5 · CD-1499
- Christian Lindberg - A composer's portrait Mar 05 · CD-1428
- Solo Flute from A to Z - Vol.3 Oct 04 · SACD-1459
- Paul Kletzki - Symphony No.3 In memoriam Apr 04 · CD-1399
- Chamber Music for Flute, Viola and Piano Dec 03 · CD-1439
- Solo Flute from A to Z - Vol.2 Apr 03 · CD-1259
- Apéritif - A French Collection for Flute and Orchestra Nov 02 · CD-1359
- Takemitsu - A String Around Autumn
- Antal Dorati - Night Music Jun 02 · CD-1099
- Café au lait - Music for Flute and Piano Dec 01 · CD-1239
- Solo Flute from A to Z - Vol.1 Apr 01 · CD-1159
- Bright Sheng: Flute Moon - China Dreams - Postcards Jun 00 · CD-1122
- Mozart - Flute Quartets May 00 · CD-1044
- Flutissimo Aug 99 · CD-103
- The Israeli Connection - flute and piano Nov 98 · CD-959
- Rota - Chamber Music Jun 97 · CD-870

== Honors ==
- Cannes Classical Young Artist of the Year Award, 2003
- Klassic Echo's Instrumentalist of the Year, 2002
- BBC Radio 3 New Generation Artist 2006-2008

== Sources ==
- Minnesota Orchestra's showcase concert magazine, May 6, page 41
