= Nikka Gershman =

Flautist and composer

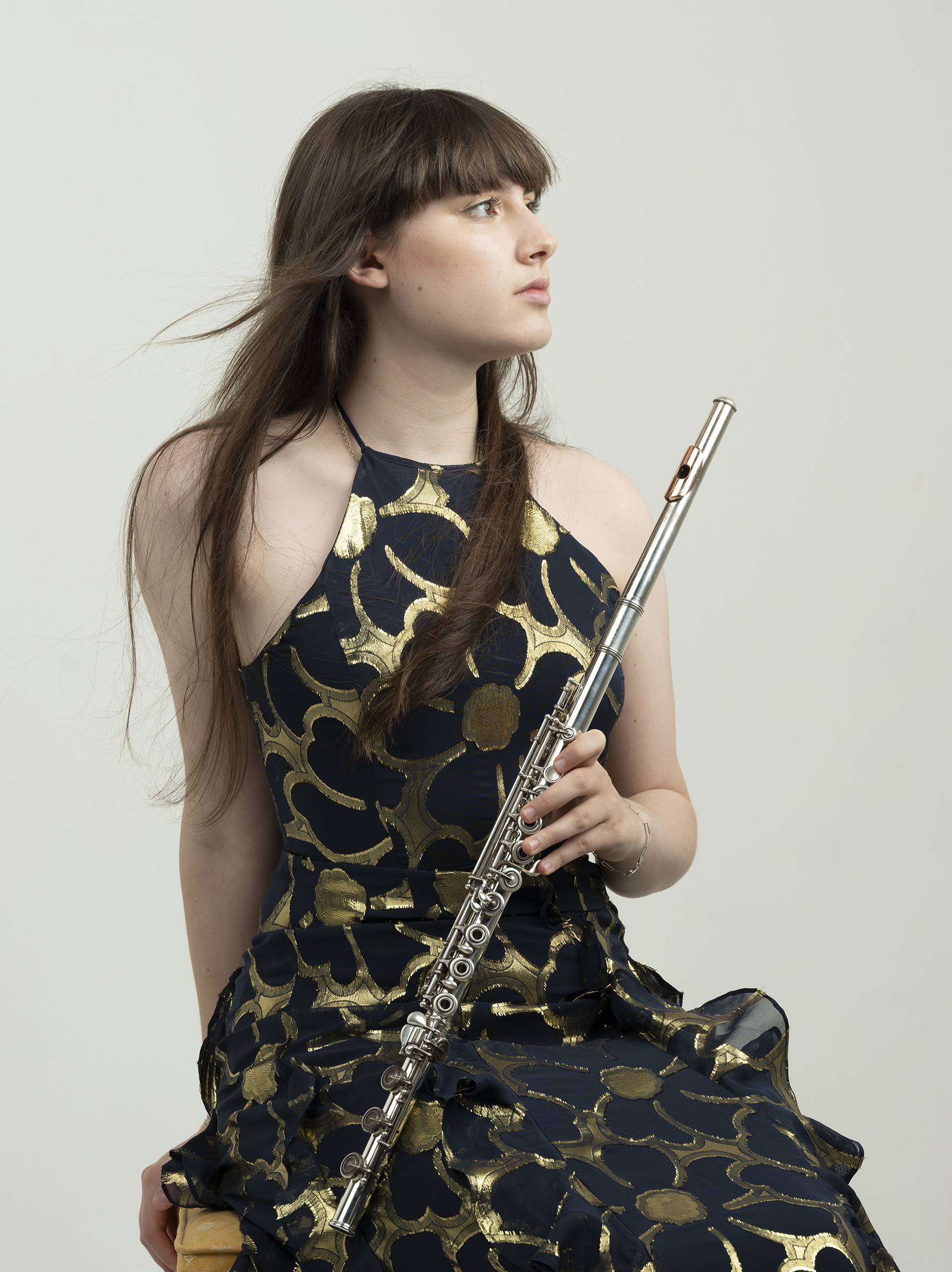
Nikka Gershman, flutist and composer 2026

Nikka Gershman (born 12 December 2007) is a flute soloist, composer, and Founder of the Music Society of the Future. Gershman has performed in concert halls including the Wiener Konzerthaus, Lincoln Center's Alice Tully Hall, Walt Disney Concert Hall, Beethoven House, and Carnegie Hall. She was a guest performer on NPR's From the Top, New York's Classical Music Radio Station WQXR-FM, and The Violin Channel. Gershman was recognized as a "Rising Star" by New York's "Our Town" journal, the 2024 "Emerging Artist of the Year" by The Flute Almanac global journal, and hailed as a "Magic Flutist" by amNY. She was the featured artist on the cover of The Flute View. Gershman made history as the youngest-ever Haynes Young Artist by the oldest flute manufacturer in America. She has been described by Rodney Punt, musicologist and contributor to Huffington Post Arts and Classical Voice North America, as having "one-upped even Heifetz by performing Hora Staccato effortlessly on flute, with her own breath and no strings attached". Gershman's transcription of Ravel's "La Valse" for flute and piano, her collection of "Three Operatic Encores" (arrangements of Verdi, Strauss, and Wagner) for flute and piano, and her original composition "When We Used to Dance", made her the youngest-ever composer published by Theodore Presser. The NEXT250 Concert at Lincoln Center, celebrating the future of American music-making curated by Lara Downes, featured the premiere of a composition by Gershman.

== Awards ==
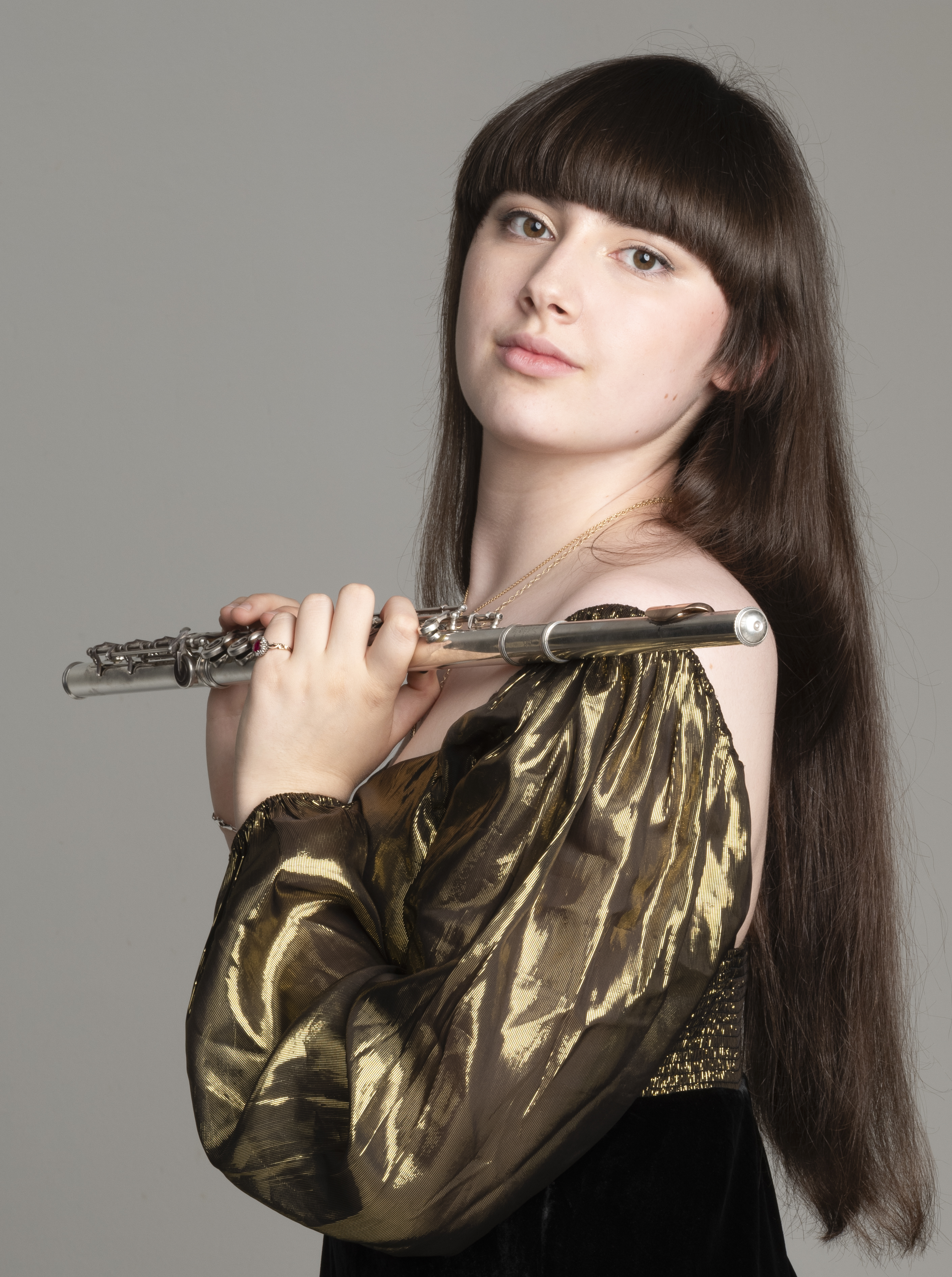
Nikka Gershman, flutist and composer

- 2025: Winner, Beverly Hills National Auditions, iPalpiti Artists International (founded by Lord Yehudi Menuhin and Eduard Schmieder)
- 2023: Youngest ever recipient of the Kovner Fellowship, full tuition scholarship, The Juilliard School
- 2023: National Winner with Distinction, YoungArts, National Foundation for the Advancement of Artists
- 2023: 1st Prize Winner, San Francisco Flute Society International Competition
- 2023: 1st Prize Winner, Pacific Musical Society & Foundation Composition Competition
- 2022: Absolute First Prize, Concorso Internazionale A Tutto Flauto
- 2022: Salon de Virtuosi Career Grant
- 2022: Libby Larsen Composition Prize, 41st Search for New Music Competition, International Alliance for Women in Music
- 2022: 1st Prize National Winner, Music Teachers’ National Association/MTNA
- 2022: Sir James Galway “Outstanding Junior Performer” Award
- 2022: 1st Prize International Winner, British Flute Society Young Performer Competition (BFS)
- 2022: Grand Prize for Exceptional Talent and Musicianship, Pasadena Showcase House 35th Annual Instrumental Competition
- 2021: 1st Prize Winner, Vancouver Symphony 27th Annual Young Artists’ Concerto Competition
