= Marianne Gedigian =

American flutist and teacher

Marianne Gedigian is an American flutist and teacher. She holds a Butler Professorship as Professor of Flute at the University of Texas at Austin Butler School of Music. She has formerly held positions as acting principal flute of the Boston Symphony Orchestra, Boston Pops Orchestra, Pittsburgh Symphony, and as principal flute of the Boston Pops Esplanade Orchestra. Gedigian has worked with composer John Williams and can be heard on the film scores for Schindler's List and Saving Private Ryan. Her teachers include Clement Barone, Doriot Anthony Dwyer, and Leone Buyse. She has performed solo recitals on four continents in the US, Australia, Japan and England. Gedigian is a Haynes flute artist.

== Biography ==
Gedigian was born and raised near Detroit, Michigan. In early high school, Gedigian began studying with Detroit Symphony Orchestra piccoloist Clement Barone. She studied flute with Doriot Anthony Dwyer while receiving a degree from the New England Conservatory, and pursued later studies with Leone Buyse.

Gedigian won 1993 Young Artist Competition at the National Flute Association Convention, and placed second in 1989. She was a member and acting principal flute of the Boston Symphony Orchestra and the Boston Pops Orchestra for over a decade, and was featured on programs including the Evening at Pops and nationally televised Fourth of July broadcasts. She collaborated with composer John Williams and can be heard on the film scores for Saving Private Ryan and Schindler's List. She was the acting Principal Flute with the Pittsburgh Symphony during the 2000–2001 season, under Maestro Mariss Jansons. She frequently transcribes works for the flute, including the Khachaturian Violin Concerto, which she performed with the Armenian Philharmonic.

She is active as a teacher and clinician, having given masterclasses to the New York Flute Club, various festivals and at the National Flute Association Convention. In addition to her professorship at the Butler School of Music, she has held positions at Boston University and The Boston Conservatory, and served on the summer faculty at the Brevard Music Center, Round Top International Institute, and Tanglewood Music Center. She is active as a chamber musician, holding positions with the Walden Chamber Players in Boston and touring throughout the US, and formerly was a part of the Dorian Wind Quintet. She frequently collaborates with fellow Butler School professor and pianist Rick Rowley. The duo has released two CDs.

== Discography ==
- Voice of the Flute (2009); Gedigian, flute and Rick Rowley, piano (CD Baby)
- Revolution (2010); Gedigian, flute and Rick Rowley, piano (Longhorn Music)

== Personal life ==
Gedigian is married to Charles Villarrubia and has one daughter.
