= Lambertson =

Lambertson is a surname. Notable people with the surname include:

- David Floyd Lambertson (born 1940), former United States Ambassador to Thailand
- William P. Lambertson (1880–1957), United States Representative from Kansas
