= Trevor Hutton (flute maker) =

New Zealand flute maker

- Born: Trevor Wyn Albert Hutton; January 25, 1923; Christchurch, New Zealand
- Died: December 21, 2017 (aged 94); Christchurch, New Zealand
- Occupation(s): Flute maker, Flute player, Jeweller
- Notable work: Concert flutes, Alto flutes, Bass flutes, Piccolos
- Spouse: Hazel Hutton (née Tolchard) (married 1946)
- Children: Judith, Graeme, Andrew

Trevor Wyn Albert Hutton (January 25, 1923 – December 21, 2017) was a New Zealand flute maker, flautist, and jeweller. He played the flute from a young age and pursued a career as a jeweller before turning to flute making.

== Early life and career ==
Trevor Wyn Albert Hutton was born on January 25, 1923, to Albert and Doris Hutton, both flute players. He married Hazel Hutton (née Tolchard) on April 27, 1946, and they had three children: Judith, Graeme, and Andrew. Raised in Spreydon, Christchurch, Hutton attended Christchurch Normal School and West Christchurch High School. He had a passion for motorbikes, starting with his father's 1923 Harley Davidson and owning several Harley Davidsons throughout his life. Hutton left school at 15 and apprenticed as a jeweller with Richards and Henshall, working there for 22 years. He later worked for Kennedys Diamond Rings and Sladen and Son Jewellers for 11 years each before retiring from jewellery to focus on his flute-making business.

== Flute manufacture ==
Trevor Hutton began flute-making in the 1970s by crafting a new headjoint for his flute. Subsequently, he completed a new flute body made of gold and silver, which he used in professional engagements. Without access to pre-made tubing from bullion merchants, he created his own tubing, posts, keys, springs, and screws from raw materials. In his early years, he made his own pads from felt and animal intestine skins, assisted by his father when pads were scarce. Hutton used gold and silver recovered from photographic processes and other sources, and made alloys for flute making. On average, crafting a flute took him about 200 hours. By visiting Powell Flutes in Boston, USA, he learned more about the manufacturing process. Although unable to afford similar equipment, he started importing pre-formed tubing and flute pads, reducing the manufacturing time. Hutton crafted concert flutes, alto flutes, bass flutes, and piccolos.

== Flautist ==
Trevor Hutton was taught to play the flute by his father and earned his LTCL around 1940. He joined Derry's Military Band at the age of 10 and the Christchurch Savage Club at 14, where he became a life member. Hutton also joined the public 3YA radio orchestra until 1959, playing live pieces for flute and piano. Hutton played jazz with Brian Marston, Doug Caldwell, and the Amigos, and formed the Serendipity Flutes flute choir in the late 1980s, which had up to 11 players. He played in a woodwind quartet alongside Jack Goldsmith (oboe), Michael Shorter (clarinet), Ross McKeitch (bassoon), and William Turner (French horn). The quintet often performed lunchtime concerts at the Great Hall of Canterbury University, now the Christchurch Arts Centre, where Hutton also gave solo recitals.

He was offered the principal flute position in the National Orchestra (later the New Zealand Symphony Orchestra) but declined for personal reasons. However, he did play with the orchestra during their Christchurch performances. Hutton served as the principal flute for the Christchurch Symphony Orchestra for 14 years from 1964, performing works such as Mozart's flute concertos and Brandenburg concertos. In later years, he joined the Risingholme Orchestra.

== Interviews and media appearances ==
In 2011, Hutton was interviewed on four occasions by the Christchurch Flute Society. He was also featured in newspaper articles and an episode of the television program Spot On, where he demonstrated flute making.
