= Gemeinhardt =

American flutes and piccolos manufacturer

Gemeinhardt Musical Instruments LLC
- Founded: 1948
- Founder: Kurt Gemeinhardt
- Headquarters: Elkhart, Indiana, United States
- Key people: David Pirtle
- Products: flutes, piccolos
- Website: http://www.gemeinhardt.com/

Gemeinhardt Co. is a manufacturer of flutes and piccolos. These musical instruments are developed by this company for all levels of musicians, beginners to professionals. Gemeinhardt was owned by Angel Industries Co. Ltd of Taiwan, widely acknowledged as a premier manufacturer of woodwind musical instruments. The Gemeinhardt Company is headquartered in Elkhart, Indiana, where many of its instruments are still made..

== Ownership ==
From 1993 to 2011, Gemeinhardt was owned by investment bankers under the corporate name Gemstone Musical Instruments. In June 2011, Gemeinhardt was acquired by Angel Industries Co. Ltd. of Taiwan, musical instrument manufacturers and business partner of Gemeinhardt for several years. David Pirtle, Gemeinhardt president and CEO, said the acquisition would allow Gemeinhardt more freedom to make decisions and run production in order to best serve the market.

While many musical instrument brands are manufactured overseas, the partnership between Gemeinhardt and Angel Industries is unique. Gemeinhardt manufactures flute components (headjoint, body, footjoint, keys) in Elkhart, Indiana, then sends them to Angel for assembly. The assembled instruments are returned to Elkhart for testing and adjusting in the Gemeinhardt workshop. While most musical instrument brands have flute components manufactured overseas, Pirtle said Gemeinhardt's method is preferable because better quality flute parts can be made in their U.S. workshop.

== History ==
Fourth-generation flute maker Kurt Gemeinhardt was brought to the United States from Markneukirchen, Germany, by George Bundy of Selmer USA which had recently relocated to Elkhart, Indiana. Working with Philip H. Marcil in the Selmer flute division, they copied the typical Louis Lot design for their flutes.

Kurt's father had studied under Emil Rittershausen, who was trained by Theobald Boehm; thus, the instruments Gemeinhardt produces can trace their lineage to the creator of the Boehm system.

In 1948, twenty years after Gemeinhardt immigrated, he founded the Kurt Gemeinhardt Company. Initially, the company crafted only very fine handmade flutes for professionals. However, the company moved to Elkhart and expanded in 1952, producing all levels of silver flutes. Beginner student flutes were also developed at this time; as Gemeinhardt's reputation for fine beginner flutes became a hallmark of the industry, these flutes eventually became the bread and butter of the corporation.

The Gemeinhardt Company is very popular in the music field, although they have not always followed the mainstream. In the mid '70s, Albert Cooper modified the placement of toneholes on the flute so it would match the common tuning of A at 440 Hz. Before this, many flutes were made with an older A435Hz tone hole placement (scale), despite being designed to play at A440Hz through the use of a shortened headjoint.

Many flute companies recognized this change and decided to make their flutes the same way, but Gemeinhardt was slow to modify its design. This in turn made notes played in the higher register on an old Gemeinhardt flute sharp and the lower register flat, which could cause issues for beginner flautists using an old Gemeinhardt (pre-21st century). With practice, they could learn to play so the notes are correct, or they could consider buying a newer Gemeinhardt.

However, the design of Gemeinhardt's flutes have changed often and have been updated and redesigned accordingly. At the National Flute Association's 2014 convention in Chicago, Gemeinhardt introduced a new line of flutes, the Kurt Gemeinhardt Generation Series. Consisting entirely of American-made conservatory and professional flutes, the Generation Series was developed by Tom Lacy and Dave Siekman. These flutes utilize the RS2012 Scale invented by famous flutists Trevor Wye, William Bennett and Eldred Spell. This scale design is claimed to be the most accurate on the market.

In 1997, Gemeinhardt acquired the Roy Seaman Piccolo Company. In addition to flutes and piccolos, Gemeinhardt also has a line of saxophones and clarinets.

== Products ==
=== Flutes ===
The Gemeinhardt company sells its flutes in different categories: Student, Conservatory, Professional, Kurt Gemeinhardt Generation Series (American-made conservatory and professional flutes), alto flutes, and bass flutes. It also sells headjoints separately. All flutes are available with an offset G (noted by O in the model number).

- Gemeinhardt models
  - Student Flutes: Model 1SP Flute / Model 2SP Flute / Model 2BLK Flute
  - Conservatory Flutes: Model 2SH Flute / Model 3B Flute / Model 3SHB Flute / Model 3SB Flute
  - Professional Flutes: Model 33SHB Flute / Model 33SB Flute / Model 33SSB Flute / Ali Ryerson Autograph Series Flute
  - Kurt Gemeinhardt Generation Series Flutes: The "Blue" Model Flute / The "White" Model Flute / The "Red" Model Flute / The "Revolution" Model Flute
  - Alto Flutes: Model 11A-BLK Alto Flute / Model 11A Alto Flute / Model 11ASH Alto Flute / Ali Ryerson Artists' Series BLK Alto Flute / Model 11AS Alto Flute
  - Bass Flutes: Model 21BSP Bass Flute / Model 21B-BLK Bass Flute
  - Headjoints: Model J1 headjoint / Model NG1 headjoint / Model NG2 headjoint

=== Piccolos ===
All Gemeinhardt and Roy Seaman Piccolos are made in the US, except the 1P Piccolo

The Gemeinhardt company also sells piccolos under several categories, which are composed of composite, silver, wood, and the Roy Seaman brand. The composite piccolo is made out of a synthetic material with some wooden texture to it, metal piccolos can be silver-plated or solid silver, wood piccolos are made of grenadilla wood and are rarely used outside because the wood can crack, and finally the Roy Seaman Piccolo sub-brand of conservatory and professional piccolos.

- Gemeinhardt Piccolo models
  - Composite Piccolos - used for outside (Marching Band) and inside (Concert Band/Orchestra): Model 1P Piccolo / Model 4P Piccolo / Model 4PMH Piccolo / Model 4PSH Piccolo
  - Metal Piccolos - used for mainly outside (Marching Band): Model 4SP Piccolo / Model "Stinger" Piccolo / Model 4SH Piccolo / Model 4S Piccolo / Model 4SS Piccolo
  - Wood Piccolos - used mainly for inside (Concert Band/Orchestra): Model 4W Piccolo / Model 4WSSK Piccolo / Model KG Limited Piccolo
  - Roy Seaman Piccolos: Model "Storm" Piccolo / Model "Storm BLK" Piccolo / Model RS Standard Piccolo / Model RS Limited Piccolo

=== Saxophones ===
- Student models: Model GSA500 LQ Alto saxophone / Model GSA600 LQ Alto saxophone / Model GST500 LQ Alto saxophone / Model GST600 LQ Alto saxophone

=== Clarinets ===
- Student models: Model 2CN1 Clarinet / Model 2CS1 Clarinet
