= Silva-Bet =

Silva-Bet is a trade name used by the Cundy-Bettoney company, a former woodwind maker and distributor in Boston, Massachusetts. Although some other products were marketed under the name Silva-Bet, including flutes and clarinet reeds, it was primarily attached to the company's flagship metal clarinet.

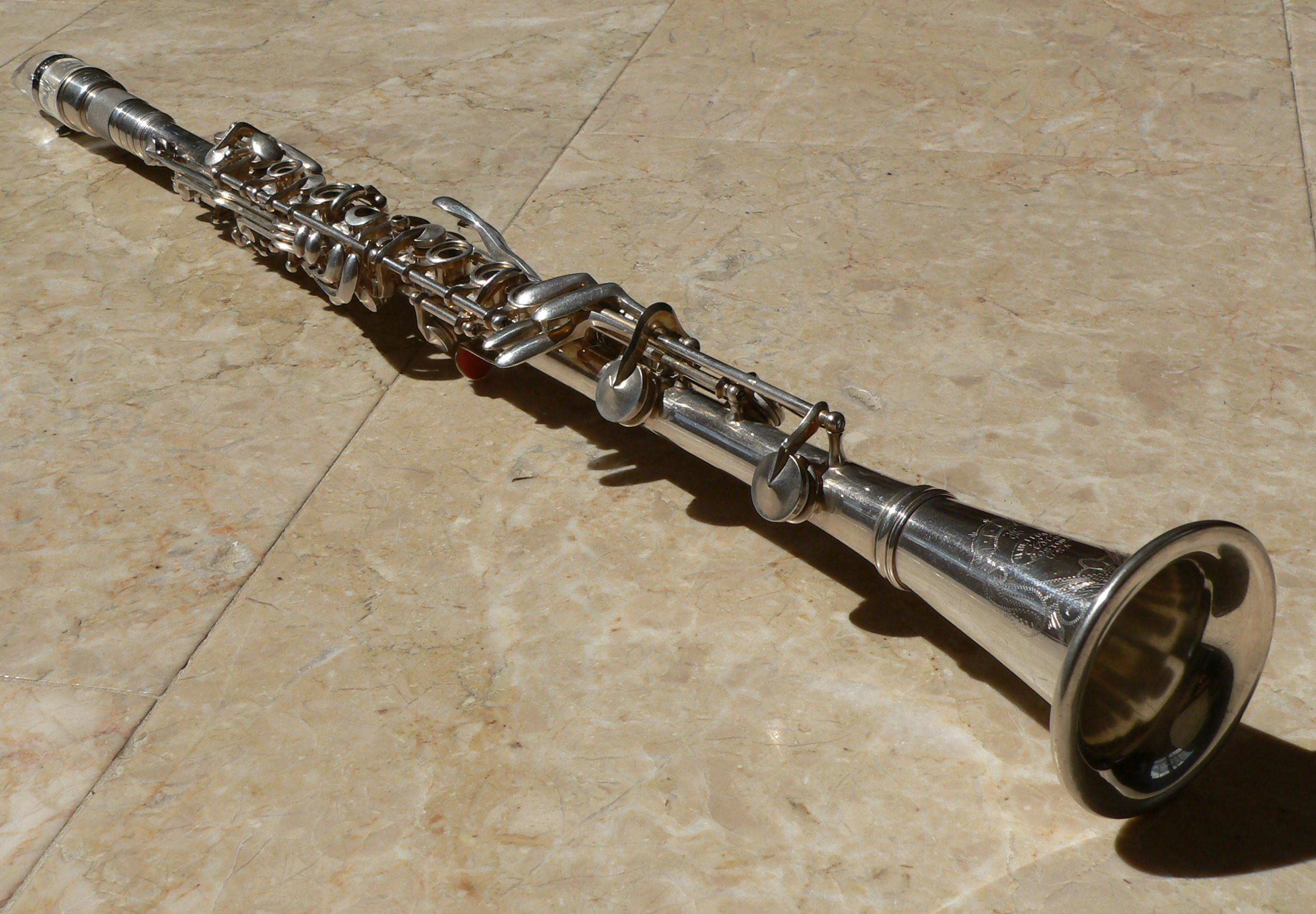
a Silva-Bet metal clarinet

== History ==
The Silva-Bet, which debuted in 1925, is generally acknowledged to have been the first successful metal clarinet. Shortly after the appearance of the Silva-Bet, other woodwind makers entered the metal clarinet market, including Selmer Paris in 1927 with their Master Model as well as American companies Buescher with their True Tone model and H. N. White with the Silver King. Penzel-Mueller and C.G. Conn, which had each tried the metal clarinet earlier with commercially unsuccessful double-walled models, returned with single-walled models—P-M with the Artist and Conn with the 514 and later the 624. Metal soprano clarinets were common during the 1930s and 1940s, but never gained enough acceptance among professionals for top-of-the-line models like the Silva-Bet to remain viable.

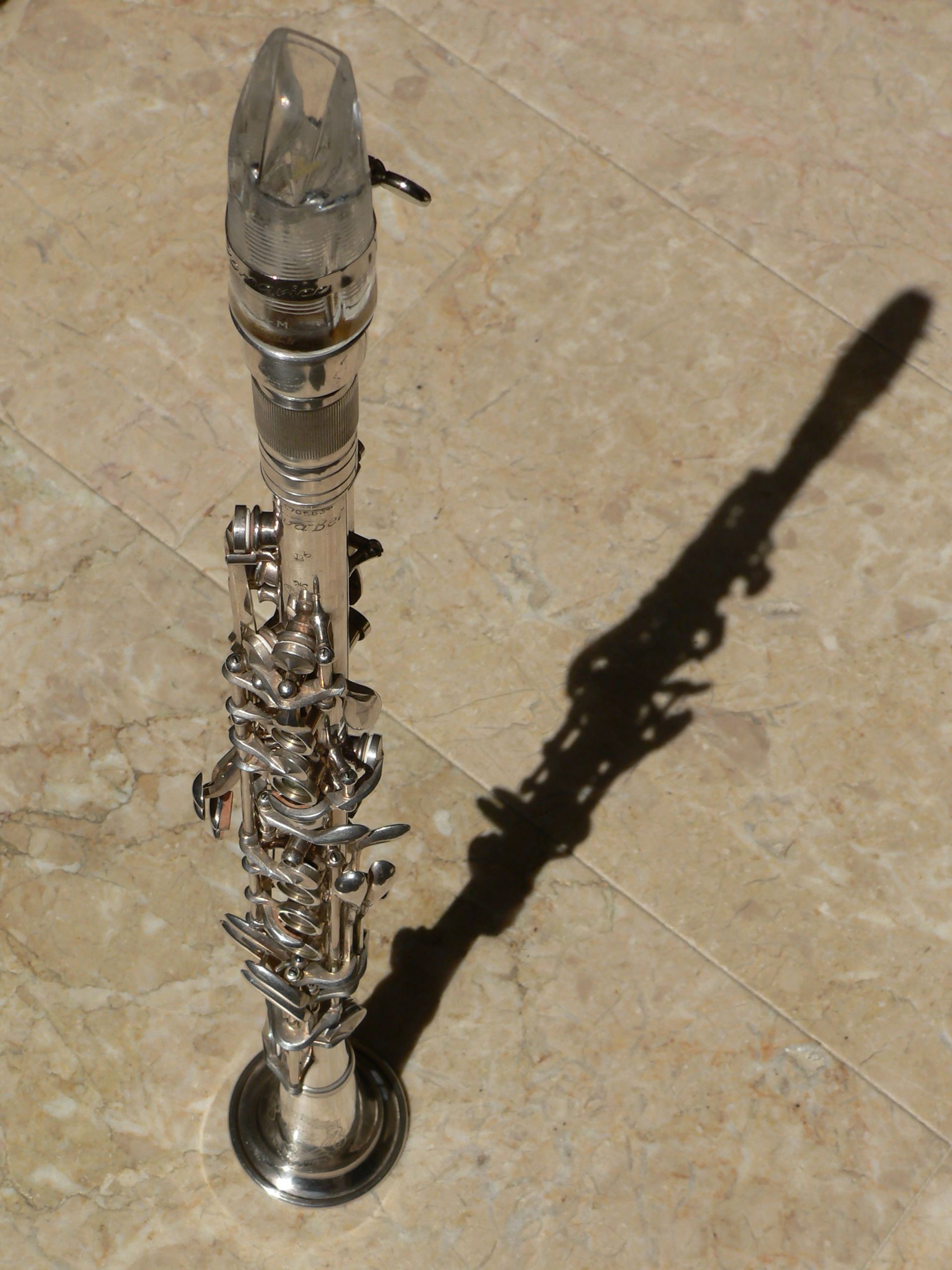
Silva-Bet no. S5047, one-piece body

The Silva-Bet was still being made, or at least distributed, in 1940, but had been discontinued by 1951. (Precise production records are difficult, if not impossible, to find.) H.N. White continued producing high-quality metal soprano clarinets into the 1960s, and Leblanc continued to make their professional metal contrabass and contra-alto clarinets until about 2010, but most professional metal soprano clarinet models had been discontinued by 1945 (In Italy, ORSI continues till today to make metal soprano clarinet). The retooling of factories for wartime production probably contributed to their demise.

== Physical characteristics ==
The Silva-Bet, body and keys, is made of an alloy variously known as maillechort, German silver or nickel silver, and is plated with silver. The toneholes, except on the earliest examples, have widened tops to improve the sealing and durability of the pads. First made with a one-piece body with detachable barrel, the Silva-Bet clarinet was later available with a two-piece body plus detachable barrel. The barrel of the Silva-Bet features a telescoping mechanism for tuning the instrument. There are at least two varieties of tuning barrel, one with a thick head and two slim rotating rings at the top, the other with a thin head with a single rotating sleeve in the middle.

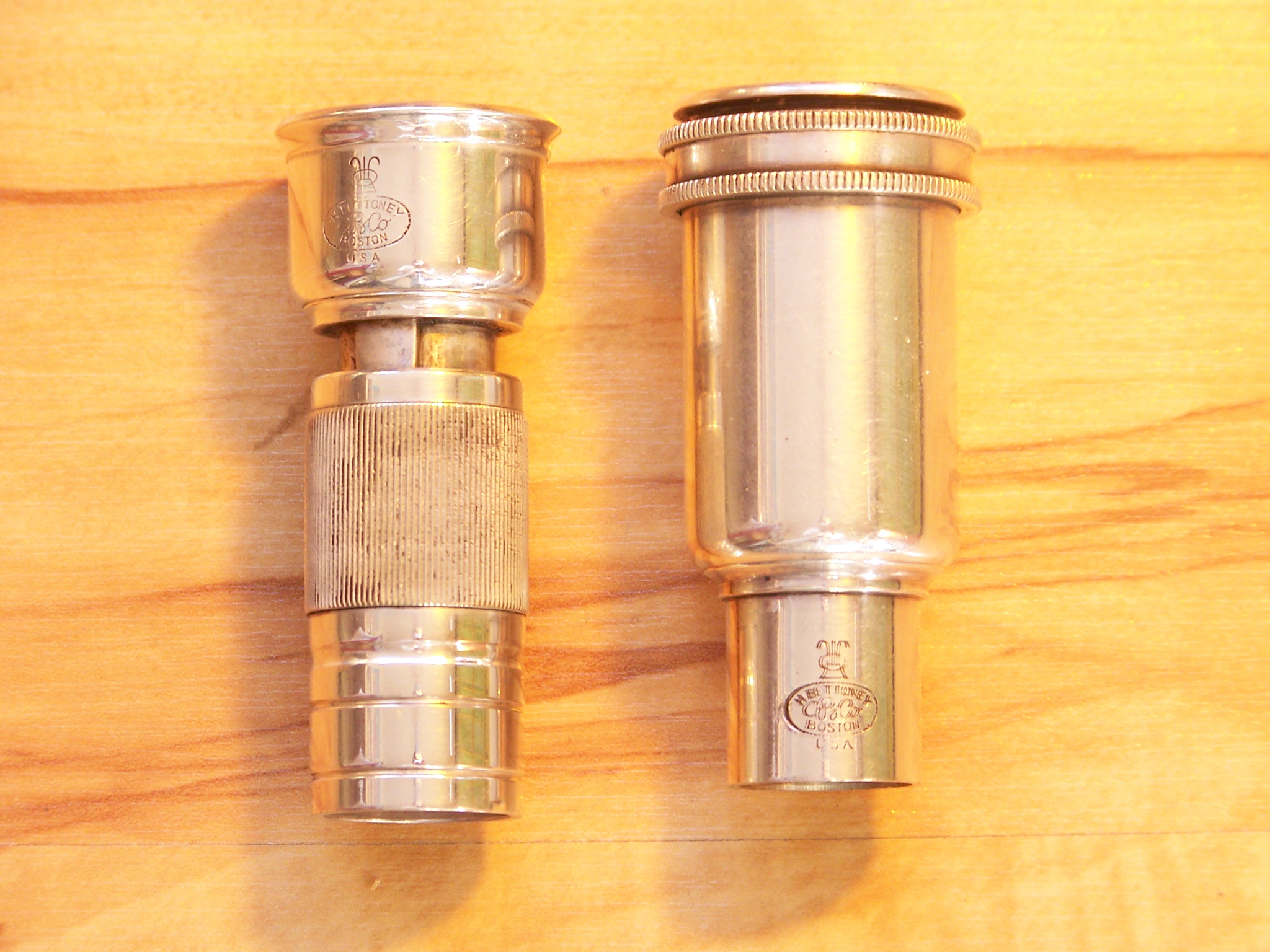
the two styles of Silva-Bet barrel

There are also at least two varieties of thumb rest, one with the platform and rest a single curved plate attached to the body by a rail, the other with the platform a box attached to the body all around and the rest soldered to that box. Earlier examples of the Silva-Bet have serial numbers beginning with S, usually followed by four digits. Later models have serial numbers beginning with V. The serial number is marked near the top of the body just below the barrel tenon, and rarely at the bottom of the body just above the bell seam. The last two digits of the serial number are stamped into the bottom of the keys.

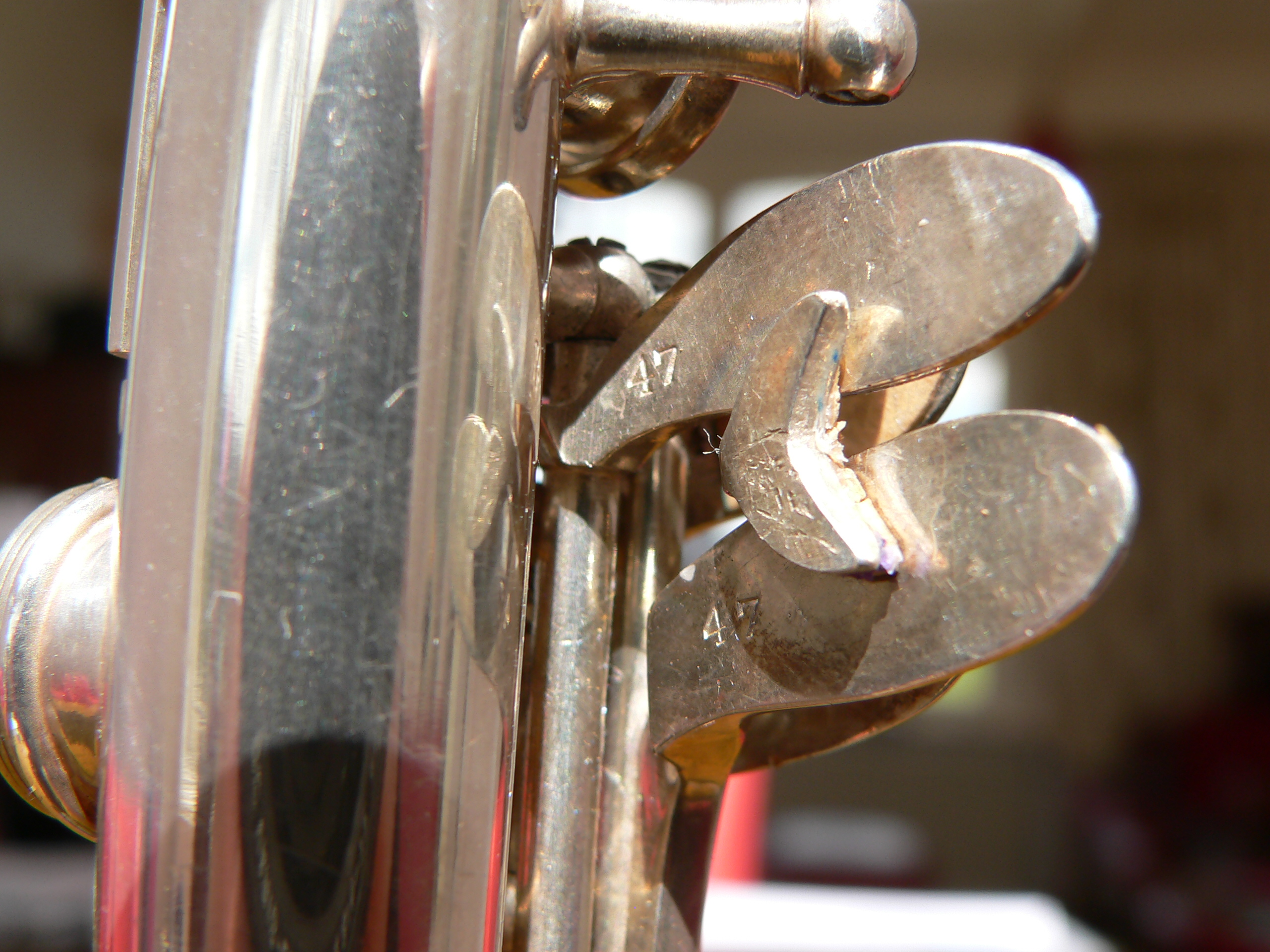
last two digits "47" stamped into the bottom of the keys (S5047)

The soprano Silva-Bet was made in the keys of E flat, B flat and A, with the B flat being by far the most common. Alto and bass Silva-Bets were also made. Standard boehm keywork (17 keys, 6 rings) was usual, but (at least on the A and B flat sopranos) some extended Boehm configurations (7th ring, articulated G sharp with extra trill key, low E flat, left-hand E flat lever) were available, as was standard Albert keywork (13 keys, 4 rollers, 4 rings).

== Collectibility and Usability ==
After a kind of backlash against them in the mid-to-late twentieth century, metal clarinets have returned to favor in some quarters. The tone quality of a fine metal clarinet like a Silva-Bet is difficult or impossible to distinguish from that of a fine wood clarinet. The best metal clarinet models are both usable and collectible today; the finest or most unusual examples can be highly collectible.

== Other Cundy-Bettoney metal clarinets ==
Cundy-Bettoney was likely the world's most prolific maker of metal clarinets; the firm manufactured more than 75,000 of the type between 1925 and 1935 alone. The Silva-Bet was their top model. The Boston Wonder and the Columbia Model were just below their top quality, as was the H Bettoney model, which was widely supplied to military bands in the U.S. The Cadet model was a better-grade student instrument while the Three-Star was the least expensive.

In its 1930s metal-clarinet advertising, Cundy-Bettoney priced its Silva-Bet at $135-150 “and up,” the Boston Wonder at $110, the P.X. Laube at $90, the Columbia at $75-80, the Madelon (made with plateau keys only) at $72-75, and the Cadet at $50.

From 1954 to 1957 Cundy-Bettoney again advertised a metal clarinet for sale, its “Three-Star” model.

The firm also produced many, many stencils marketed under other distributor's names, including Martin Handcraft metal clarinets. At the time Bettoney was making Martin's metal clarinets, Martin was making the saxophones sold under the H Bettoney name. Most high-quality stencils are essentially identical to the Boston Wonder, while most of the cheaper stencils are essentially identical to the Three-Star.
