= Amy Porter (flutist) =

American flutist and pedagogue

Amy Porter is an American flutist and pedagogue. American Record Guide calls her a "charismatic and highly skilled performer." She is currently Professor of Flute at the University of Michigan. She is in international demand for solo and chamber work, having been featured on National Public Radio and PBS' Live from Lincoln Center programs. She previously held the position of assistant principal flute in the Atlanta Symphony Orchestra. She received both Bachelors and Masters of Music degrees from Juilliard School of Music where her primary teachers included Samuel Baron and Jeanne Baxtresser. She pursued additional study in Austria with Alain Marion and Peter-Lukas Graf. Porter is a William S. Haynes Flute Artist.

== Biography ==
Porter was born to Diana Joan and Richard Porter and raised in Wilmington, Delaware. She played both the flute, studying with Deborah Carter Smith, and trumpet until she was 17, when she solely pursued the flute. Her parents were very supportive of her interest in music, often driving her to Philadelphia to attend concerts and rehearsals of the Philadelphia Orchestra. She later attended the Juilliard School in New York City, where she studied with prominent pedagogues Samuel Baron and Jeanne Baxtresser.

She has received many prizes for her playing, including the Third Kobe International Flute Competition in Japan which garnered her international attention. She has been a prizewinner in the 2001 Paris/Ville d’Avray International Flute Competition and Alphonse Leduc Prize, 1984 New York Flute Club competition, 1990 National Flute Association's Young Artists Competition, Artists International, Ima Hogg, and Flute Talk competitions. She returned to the Kobe International Flute Competition in 2005 to serve as the American judge on the panel. Porter has given premieres of many works, including Ellen Taaffe Zwilich's Elegy, Soliloquy and Finale for Flute and Strings, three sonatas of Christopher Caliendo, and Michael Daugherty's Trail of Tears, which is dedicated to her.

She is active as a teacher and clinician throughout the US and abroad. She is the founder of the "Anatomy of Sound" website AOS-Wellness which features Porter and movement specialist Laura Dwyer with contributing guests. In addition, she has released sets of instructional DVDs through the Theodore Presser Company, the ABCs of Flute for the Absolute Beginner, as well as through the "Anatomy of Sound" workshop. She is on the faculty of the Brevard Music Center, and MPULSE Academy at the University of Michigan. In 2006, she was awarded the Henry Russel Award from the University of Michigan for "distinguished scholarship and conspicuous ability as a teacher."

== Discography ==
- Treasures by Philippe Gaubert Amy Porter, flute; Tim Carey, piano; Soundset (Digital download) (2021)
- Ballade: Music by Philippe Gaubert; Amy Porter, Flute; Tim Carey, piano Soundset (2020)
- Philippe Gaubert A Study Guide; Penelope Fischer, historian; Amy Porter, flute; Tim Carey, piano; (2019) (DVD) Soundset
- Lyric Concerto by William Bolcom; Amy Porter, flute; University of Michigan Symphony Orchestra, Kenneth Kiesler, conductor;KAIROS / Centaur Records, (2020)
- Trail of Tears by Michael Daugherty; Amy Porter, flute; Albany Symphony Orchestra, David Alan Miller, conductor;Dreamachine / NAXOS Records, (2018)
- Mangabeira; Amy Porter, flute, Juan-Miguel Hernandez, viola, João Luiz, guitar; Soundset Recordings, (2015)
- In Translation: Six Cello Suites by J.S.Bach; Amy Porter, flute; Equilibrium, (2013)
- American Art; Amy Porter, flute, Christopher Harding, piano; Equilibrium, (2013)
- The ABCs of Flute for the Absolute Beginner (DVD), Amy Porter, flute, Larry Clark, director, Carl Fischer/ Eko Productions, (2010)
- Telemann: 12 Fantasias for Flute without Bass; Amy Porter, flute, Equilibrium, (2008)
- Passacaglia; Amy Porter, flute, Equilibrium, (2007)
- Porter Ambrose King: Amy Porter, flute, Nancy Ambrose King, Oboe, Phillip Bush, Piano, Boston Records, (2003)
- Meridian: Chamber Music Works 1989-1997; Aucourant Records, (1999)
- LeBaron: Sacred Theory of the Earth, Atlanta Chamber Players, Composers Recordings, (2000)
- Soiree Sweets; Atlanta Chamber Players, Aca Digital, (1998)
- Conversations; Atlanta Chamber Players, Aca Digital, (1996)
- Bach on Wood; Brian Slawson, Percussion, Amy Porter, Flute, Sony Records, (1985)
