= Muramatsu Flutes =

Japanese flute manufacturer

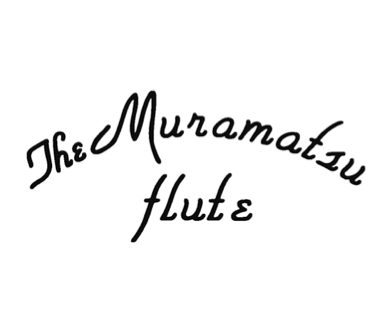
Muramatsu logo.

Muramatsu Flutes is a flute manufacturer founded by Koichi Muramatsu. It is probably one of the oldest Japanese classical flute companies, having manufactured the instrument since 1923. Their handmade flutes are made from sterling silver; 9K, 14K, 18K, and 24K gold; as well as platinum. Many artisans who have worked for Muramatsu have also created many of the new companies in Japan that make high-quality handmade flutes.

The factory Muramatsu Flute MSG. Co., Ltd. (村松フルート製作所) is located in the city of Tokorozawa, Japan. The sister company that sells the flutes is Muramatsu Inc. (村松楽器販売) and is located in Shinjuku, Tokyo, with branches in Osaka, Nagoya, and Yokohama in Japan, and dealers all over the world.

Famous flautists who use this brand include James Galway, Sharon Bezaly, Sami Junnonen, and Lizzo.
