= Albert Cooper (flute maker) =

Albert Cooper (April 12, 1924 – January 25, 2011) was a British flute maker who apprenticed at Rudall Carte until World War II. After discharge, he returned to Rudall Carte but left in 1959 and set himself up as flute maker.

== Flutes manufactured ==
- C flutes - 80
- Alto flutes - 8
- Piccolos - 2
- Bass flute in C - 3

Cooper's primary contribution to flute making is the Cooper Scale, where the position and size (opening) of the flute's tone holes have been accurately determined. This has been now universally adopted and is promoted by all the major flute makers, in particular the flute maker Brannen Brothers. This new scale replaces the old Boehm system scale and measurements still being used in flute manufacture into the 1990s.
