= Tip Lamberson =

Nathaniel "Tip" Lamberson
- Born: February 15, 1922
- Died: September 13, 2005 (aged 83)
- Occupation: flute maker

Nathaniel "Tip" Lamberson (1922–2005), also known as "N.D. Lamberson", was one of the premier American flute makers. Tip made a total of 730 flutes from 1968 to 1985, when he officially retired from the flute-making industry.

== Biography ==
Lamberson, a flutist and engineering student attending both the University of Arizona and Iowa State University, visited the Haynes and Powell flute factories wanting to upgrade to a professional level instrument. After testing flutes, Lamberson decided to purchase one of the fine woodwind instruments. Lamberson was dismayed when he was told there would be a 4-year wait for his flute. This inspired him to instead make his own flute.

Lamberson partnered with Pearl L. West of Iowa, founder of West Music, who was also trying to develop his own flute, although he was not far along in his endeavor. West did, however, provide Lamberson with the raw materials he needed to develop his first flute, serial no. 1. Lamberson's first flute had tuning issues which were quickly resolved. Lamberson's design changed little since flute serial no. 2.

It was at this time that Alton McCanless partnered with Lamberson and moved to Oskaloosa, Iowa, where Lamberson was manufacturing flutes in his basement. The pair purchased Platz Oboe and McCanless was put in charge of producing the Oboes. West eventually separated his partnership with Lamberson citing that sales were not keeping up with costs. Soon after West's departure, Lamberson began finding success with his high-quality instruments.

In all there were 730 flutes made by Lamberson. Not all were complete: West bought one unfinished and one customer wanted a raw body only, with no holes. Most were solid coin silver, although 26 were made of red gold and 35 white gold. There were also 11 flutes made in conjunction with Jack Moore of Elkhart. These were labeled "MOORE-LAMBERSON".

Lamberson No. 1 now belongs to the Historical Society of Iowa, and resides in Des Moines. The last, No. 730, is a red gold flute with an extra C foot.

Lamberson's silver bodied flutes can easily sell for over $3,000 and his more rare white gold models for up to $10,000.

Lamberson died on September 13, 2005, in Oskaloosa, Iowa. Lamberson flutes continued to be made by Tip's business partner, Alton McCanless, in Oskaloosa up until his death on June 17, 2016.
