= William S. Haynes =

American flutemaker (1864–1939)

- William S. Haynes
- Born: 1864; East Providence, Rhode Island, U.S.
- Died: 1939 (aged 74–75); Winter Park, Florida, U.S.
- Burial place: Mt. Auburn Cemetery, Cambridge, MA; 42.368443°N 71.147864°W
- Occupation: Flute maker
- Website: William S. Haynes Flute Company

William Sherman Haynes (1864–1939) was the founder of the William S. Haynes Flute Company of Boston, alongside his brother, George. The company was founded in 1888 and is America's oldest flute manufacturer and remains one of the world's leading makers of concert flutes.

== Career ==
Haynes was a master silversmith. He was the son of a sea captain and a school teacher. Haynes established his flute-making shop, Wm S Haynes Co., in Boston. It remained in Boston until 2010, when it moved to Acton, Massachusetts.

Haynes patented his distinctive flute design in 1914, and the company has since become a provider of silver and gold instruments to many of the world's most prominent orchestral, chamber and jazz musicians.

High-profile soloists to have performed on a Haynes flute include Georges Barrère and Jean-Pierre Rampal. Most notably, the company made silver, gold, and 90/10 platinum-iridium alloy flutes for Barrère. Edgard Varèse's piece, Density 21.5, was composed for Barrère's debut on his platinum Haynes flute; 21.5 was a reference to the density of platinum. At US$3,750 in 1935, it cost about four times more than his gold one purchased in 1927 (in real dollars: US $1,250 in 1927 and US$3,750 in 1935 are about US $16,000 and US$65,000, respectively, in 2014 dollars).

== Death and legacy ==
Haynes retired to Florida in 1936 and died there in 1939. He was buried at Mt. Auburn Cemetery in Cambridge, MA in February 1939.

When the recent owner John Fuggetta died, his widow, Stella Fuggetta, sold the company to Eastman Strings in 2004.
