= Brannen Brothers =

Brannen Brothers Flutemakers, Inc is a manufacturer of custom flutes, located in Woburn, Massachusetts, United States. Founded in 1978, Brannen Brothers makes each flute by hand. In 2007, the company was sold by its founders to a trio of managers.

Brannen Brothers creates and sells the Brögger Flute, the 15/85 Brögger Flute and the Kingma System Flute. They are all sold under the Brannen-Cooper name.

The Brögger Flute is the "classic" Brannen Brothers flute. The 15/85 Brögger flute is also available. It gets its name from its composition of 15% gold and 85% silver. The Brögger flute comes with the largest number of options of any Brannen Brothers flute. Options include body tubing material, key styles, pitch, and footjoint type.

The Kingma System flute is the result of collaboration between Bickford Brannen and Eva Kingma. It can be played as a traditional French-style flute, but has six additional keys which allow flutists to play quarter-tone scales and multiphonics.

The Brannen-Cooper fund was created in 1994. It provides funding for concerts, masterclasses, and flute choir coaching.

Brannen Brothers Flutemakers was featured on an episode of How It's Made.
