= Georges Barrère =

French flutist (1876–1944)

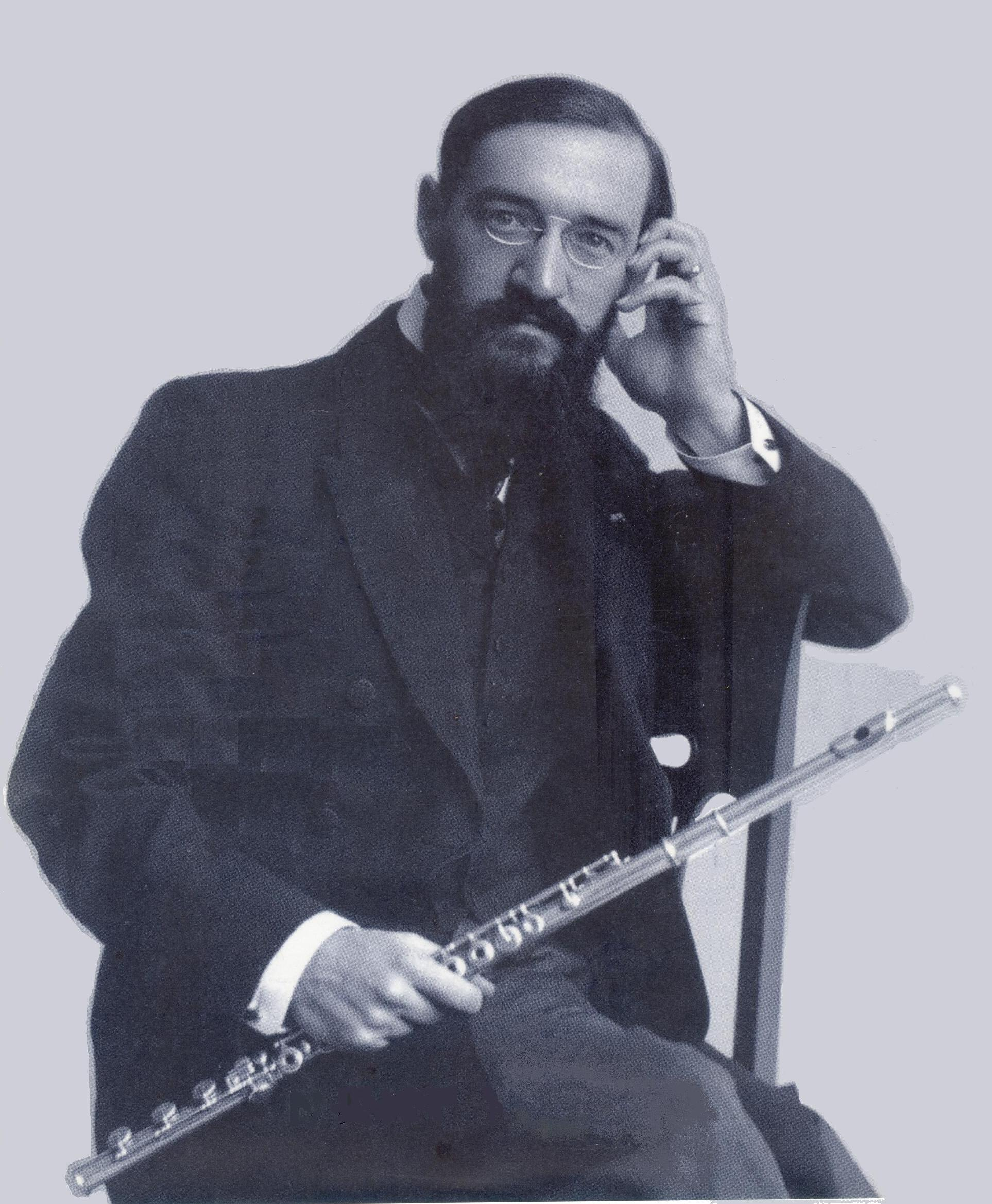
Barrère in New York in 1908

Georges Barrère (Bordeaux, October 31, 1876 – New York, June 14, 1944) was a French flutist.

== Biography ==
=== Early life ===
Georges Barrère was the son of a cabinetmaker, Gabriel Barrère, and Marie Périne Courtet, an illiterate farmer's daughter from Guilligomarc'h. They married in 1874. They had previously had a son Étienne, out of wedlock, in 1872. George did not regard his parents as musical although his father wished he had been a tenor instead of a carpenter. In 1879, the family moved to Paris. By the year 1886, they had moved to Épernon near Chartres.

The story goes that Étienne had a tin whistle which he discarded in favour of a violin. Georges got the whistle and later boasted that he had become a virtuoso on the six-holed instrument while Étienne was still struggling with elementary scales on the fiddle. The boys went to École Drouet, the village school and although modest, they were the beneficiaries of the new Jules Ferry laws which mandated free education for all French children. The principal of the school was a bandmaster in his spare time and Georges used to follow the band, when it marched through the streets of the town, tooting on his penny-whistle. The band members actually encouraged him and when the Barrères moved back to Paris in 1888, Monsieur Chouet, the principal, recommended that Gabriel let Georges have music lessons.

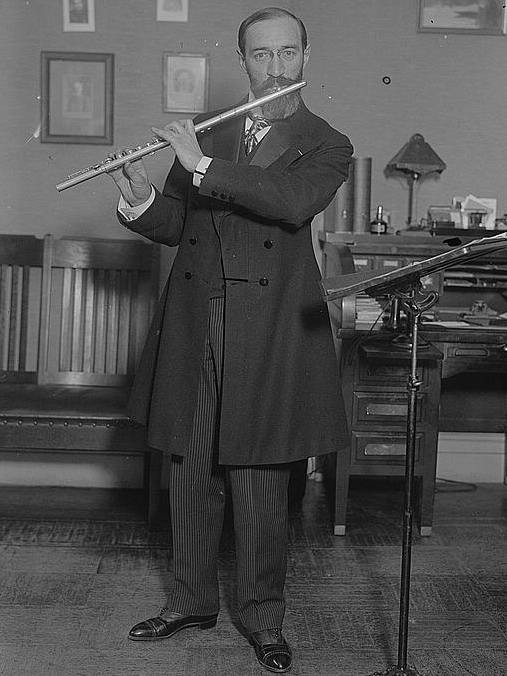
Barrère in 1916

=== The Paris Conservatoire ===
Back in Paris, Georges was required to attend cadet training as a result of the Franco-Prussian War and he became a member of a fife corps which was instructed by a student at the Paris Conservatoire. The instructor persuaded him to take lessons with his own teacher at the Conservatoire, Léon Richaud, with whom Barrère began his studies on the flute. Richaud took him to audition at the Conservatoire and although he was not accepted, he was allowed to have weekly coaching with Henry Altès, professor of flute. After a further audition, he was accepted at the Conservatoire at the age of fourteen.

Progress under the aging and traditional Altès was slow and critiques of Barrère's performances by the faculty were less than glowing. In 1893, Paul Taffanel replaced Altès as professor of flute and this Barrère later described as the turning point of his life. Instead of wasting class time on five-finger exercises, of which Altès had published a whole bookful, Taffanel taught the students how to analyze and dissect the music in order to discover its nuances. Barrère later described him as the best flutist in the world and probably irreplaceable. He discouraged excessive expression, vibrato and sentimentality. Barrère experienced an immediate improvement which was noted by his examining professors in their reports. In 1895, he won first prize in the concours.

At the age of seventeen, Barrère started doing freelance work and played in the orchestra at the Folies Bergère for a while. This helped him fund his studies at the Conservatoire. While still a student, he also obtained a free-lance position in the orchestra of the Société nationale de musique (MSN) which premiered Prélude à l'après-midi d'un faune by Claude Debussy in 1894. It was one of the most momentous occasions in music of the turn of the 20th century, ushering in a whole new language of harmony and orchestral colour, and, for the young Barrére to have been the one to play the opening notes on solo flute, was an experience like no other. Debussy was frequently present at rehearsals and continued to work on refining the score while these were in progress.

=== European career ===
After completing his studies, Barrère organized a woodwind organization called the Société moderne d'instruments à vent (SMIV) (Modern Society for Wind Instruments), which gave concerts, and was also involved with the Concerts del'opera which held orchestral concerts at the opera house. Later, he gained entry to the Société des compositeurs de musique.

In 1897, Barrère became an instructor at the Collège Stanislas in Montparnasse and held the position for seven years. In the same year, he was appointed a flutist in the Concerts Colonne, a major Paris orchestra, of which his former classmate from the conservatory, Pierre Monteux was a violist and later became assistant conductor. The orchestra toured Europe under trying conditions which was good practice for the young musician who later would tour extensively in the United States.

=== The New World ===
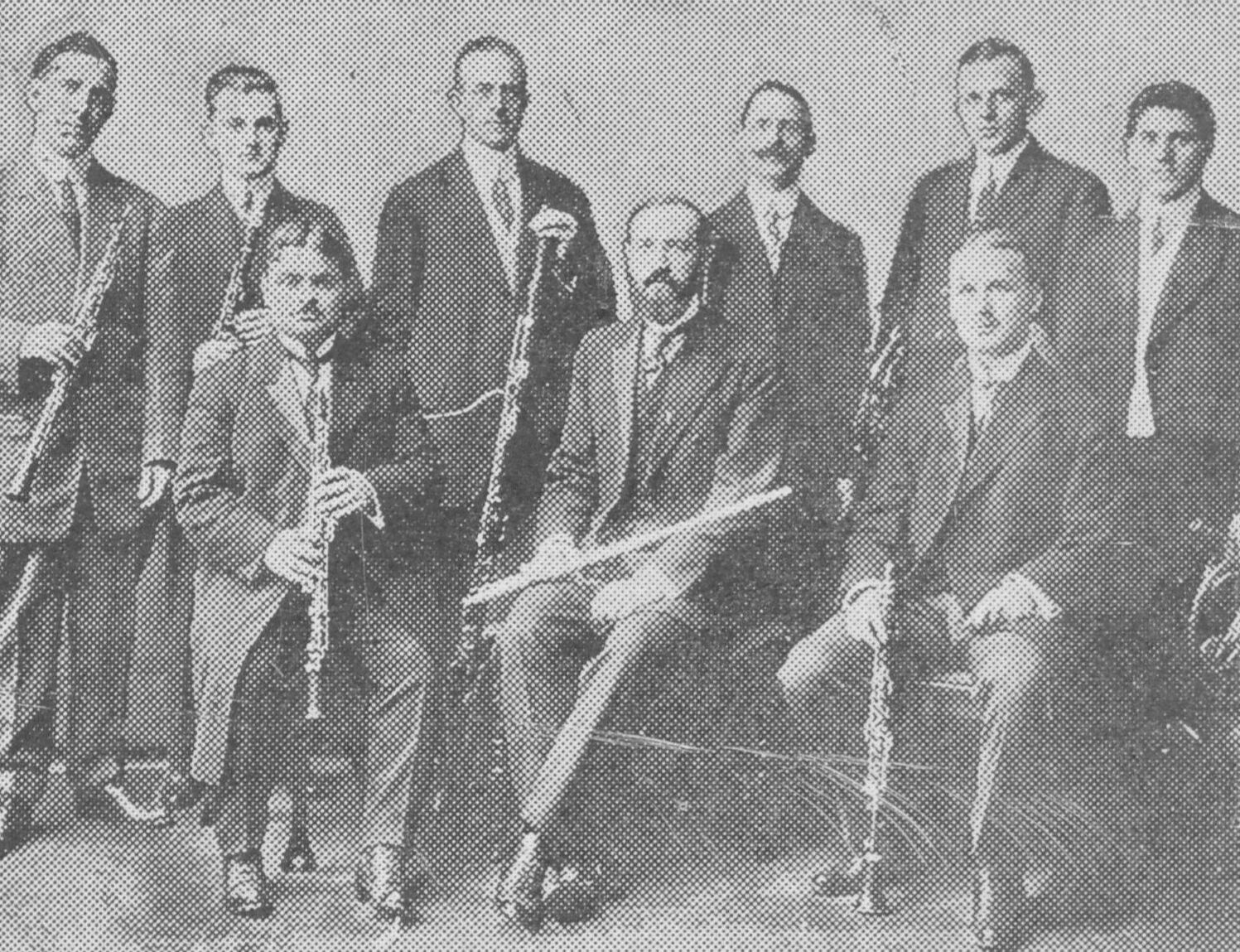
The Barrère Ensemble. Publicity photo from their 1915 U.S. tour

In 1905, Barrère was invited by Walter Damrosch to play for New York Symphony Orchestra (which later merged with the New York Philharmonic), a position he accepted and in which he remained for the rest of his life but for one break. Some major works were written for him including the Poem of Charles Tomlinson Griffes and Density 21.5 by Edgard Varèse. He gave solo recitals in New York accompanied by pianist Alice Marion Shaw.

Barrère founded the Barrère Ensemble of Wind Instruments in 1910 and the Little Symphony chamber orchestra in 1915. In his later life, he taught on the faculty of the Institute of Musical Art (now the Juilliard School). One of his pupils there was the flautist Arthur Lora who succeeded Barrère as professor of flute in 1944.

He died on June 14, 1944.
