= Tāng (surname) =

Tang (湯/汤)
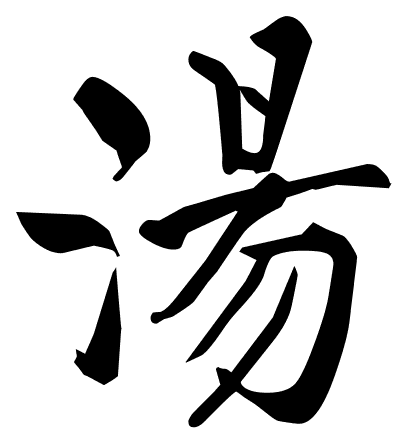
- Romanization: Tāng (Mandarin Pinyin); Tong^{1} (Cantonese Jyutping); Thng (Hokkien Pe̍h-ōe-jī)
- Language: Han Chinese

Origin
- Language: Old Chinese
- Meaning: soup, broth, stock

Other names
- Variant forms: Tong, Teng, Hong, Thng, Thung

Tang (/tɑːŋ/; simplified Chinese: 汤; traditional Chinese: 湯; pinyin: Tāng) is a Chinese surname. It is the 72nd surname in the Hundred Family Surnames of the Song dynasty and the 101st most common surname in China in 2013. The Tang family name traces its lineage from Tang of Shang, the first ruler of the Shang dynasty. In modern times the character can also mean "soup" or "broth". In Cantonese, the surname is pronounced Tong^{1} (in Jyutping), and in Hokkien, it is pronounced Thng (in Pe̍h-ōe-jī).

== Notable people ==
- Tang Xianzu (Chinese: 湯顯祖; 1550–1616), Chinese playwright
- Tang Enbo (1898–1954), Nationalist general in the Republic of China
- Tang Xiaodan (1910–2012), Chinese film director
- Tang Yuhan (1913–2014), Hong Kong doctor and oncologist
- Tang Yijie (1927–2014), Chinese scholar and professor
- John Tong Hon (born 1939), Chinese Roman Catholic cardinal and Bishop of Hong Kong
- Tang, Ming Yue (Chinese: 湯明越), a news analyses, and an LGBT rights activist of Taiwan
- Tang, Lan hua (Chinese: 湯蘭花), a female singer of Taiwan
- Ronny Tong (born 1950), Hong Kong politician
- Timothy Tong (born 1949), Hong Kong commissioner
- Kent Tong (born 1958), Hong Kong actor
- Tang Sulan (born 1965), Chinese writer and politician
- Angela Tong (born 1975), Hong Kong actress

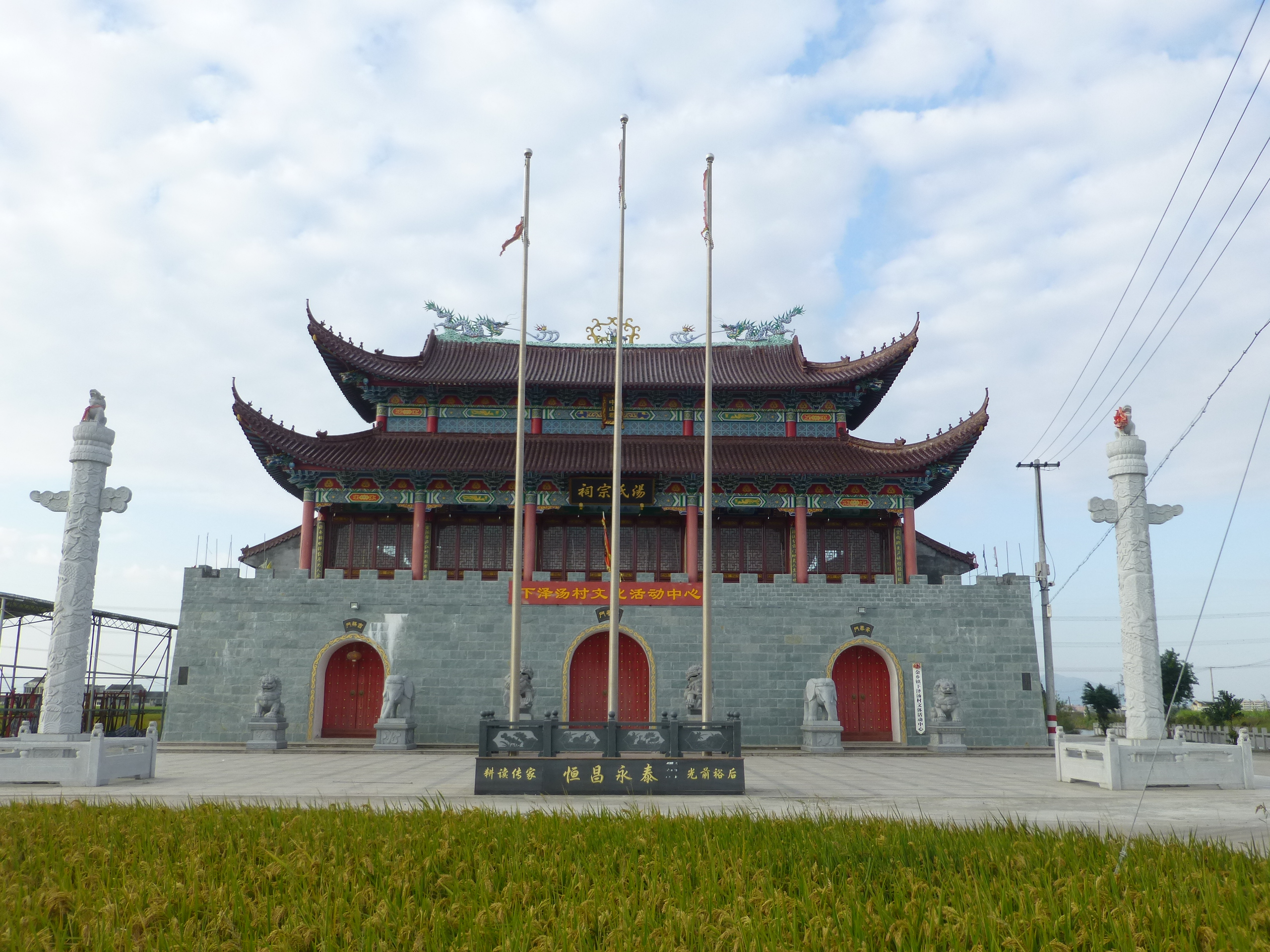
The Tang family temple in Jinxiang Town, Cangnan County, Zhejiang

- Tang Wei (simplified Chinese: 汤唯; traditional Chinese: 湯唯; pinyin: Tāng Wéi; born 7 October 1979) is a Chinese actress
- Katy Tang (Chinese: 湯凱蒂; pinyin: Tāng Kǎidì; 9 July 1984) is a former American elected official in San Francisco, California
- Muhai Tang (simplified Chinese: 汤沐海; traditional Chinese: 湯沐海; pinyin: Tāng Mùhǎi; born 1949 in Shanghai) is a Chinese conductor
- Tang Jiali (Chinese: 汤加丽) is a Chinese dancer and model
- Tang Yifen (Chinese: 汤贻汾) ca. 1778-1853 was a Chinese landscape painter and calligrapher during the Qing dynasty (1644–1912).
- Tang Can (simplified Chinese: 汤灿; traditional Chinese: 湯燦; pinyin: Tāng Càn; born 12 June 1975) is a Chinese singer
- Tang Muli (Chinese: 汤沐黎; pinyin: Tāng Mùlǐ; born 1947 in Shanghai) is a Chinese painter and poet based in Montreal, Quebec, Canada
- Tang Tao (simplified Chinese: 汤涛; traditional Chinese: 湯濤; pinyin: Tāng Tāo; born May 1963) is a Chinese mathematician currently serving as President of BNU-HKBU United International College
- Tang Chao (physicist) (Chinese: 汤超 born 1958) is a Chair Professor of Physics and Systems Biology at Peking University
- Tang He (Chinese: 湯和; 1326–1395), courtesy name Dingchen, was a significant character in the rebellion that ended the Yuan dynasty and was one of the founding generals of Ming dynasty
- Tang Te-Chang (Chinese: 湯德章; 1907–1947) was a Taiwanese lawyer who was killed in the aftermath of the February 28th Incident
- Asher Hong (Chinese: 湯健華; born 2004), American artistic gymnast
- Thung Sin Nio (Chinese: 汤新娘; Pe̍h-ōe-jī: Thng Sin-niû), Indonesian physician, politician, and suffragist

== See also ==
- Táng (surname) (唐)
- Deng (surname) (鄧)
- Teng (surname) (滕)
