= André Jaunet =

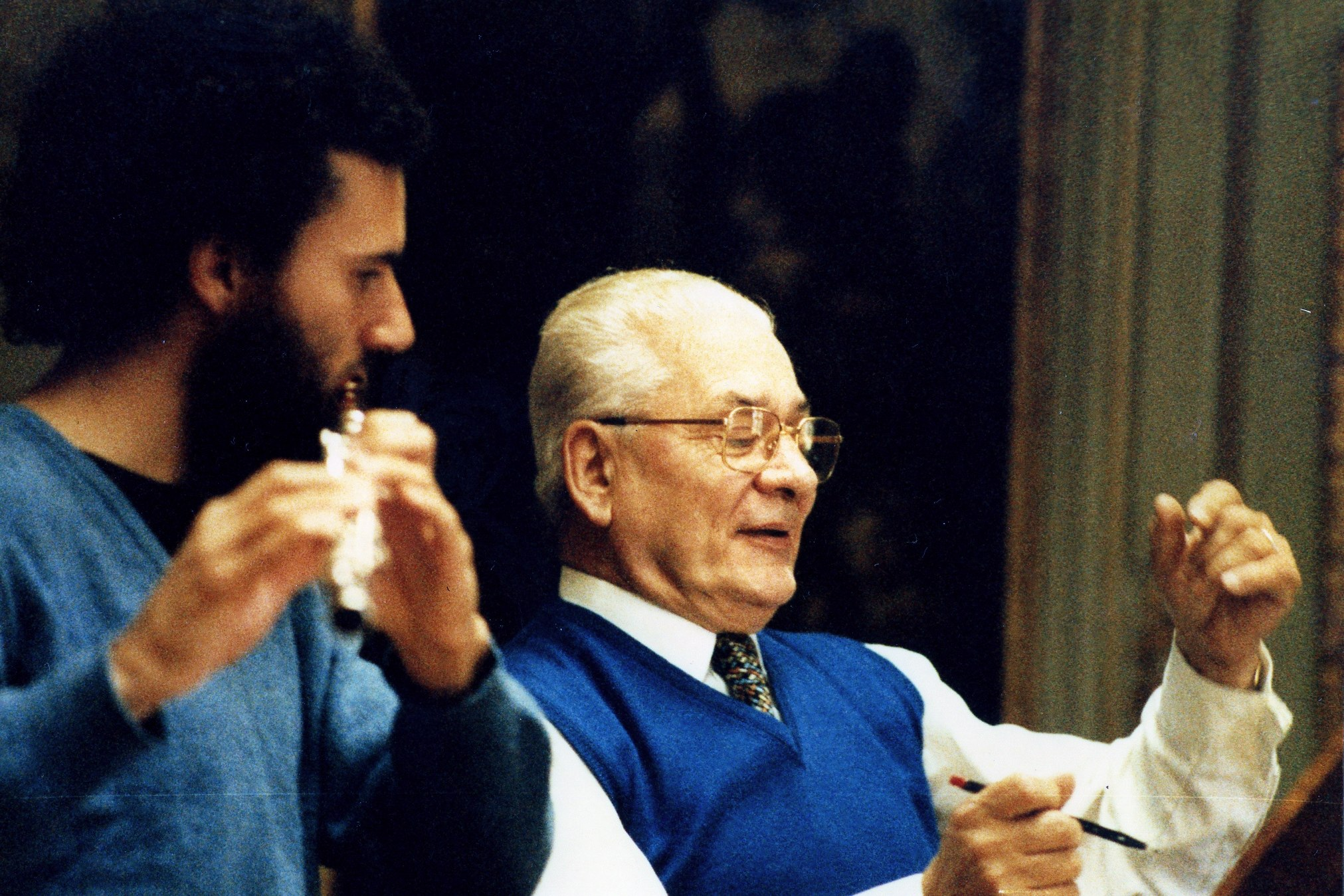
- André Jaunet teaching

Background information
- Born: May 17, 1911; Corné, France
- Died: December 13, 1988 (aged 77) Zürich, Switzerland
- Instrument: Flute

André Jaunet (May 17, 1911 – December 13, 1988) was a French-Swiss flutist. In later years he worked as a teacher in Zürich, Switzerland, where he taught flautists Peter-Lukas Graf and Aurèle Nicolet, Conrad Klemm among others.

== Biography ==
André Jaunet was born on May 17, 1911, in Corné, France. From 1924 to 1927, he studied with Etienne Moncelet in Angers. From 1927 to 1929, he completed his studies with Marcel Moyse in Paris. From 1929 to 1931 he studied at the Paris Conservatory under Philippe Gaubert. In 1937, he married Clotilde Faillettaz. They had two children: Philippe Jaunet (born 1938), and Yvonne Jaunet (born 1940).

On December 13, 1988, André Jaunet died at the age of 77 in Zürich after a battle with liver cancer. His ashes are in his beloved native French village of Corné in Anjou's Loire Valley.

== Career ==
After occupying the principal flute positions of the Opera de Lille (France), in the Stadtorchester Winterthur (Switzerland), and the Bern Symphony Orchestra (Switzerland), Jaunet moved to Zürich, Switzerland, where he was principal flutist in the Tonhalle Orchestra from 1938 to 1978. He taught at the Conservatory and Musikhochschule (now Zürcher Hochschule der Künste) from 1938 to 1981. In 1973 he accepted a year-long guest professorship at the Hochschule für Musik Freiburg (Germany). In 1977, he was a guest professor at the University of Toronto (Canada) for one year. He participated as a juror in many competitions outside Switzerland. Jaunet held summer courses in Banff (Canada), Japan, Sweden, Holland and, near the end of his life (between 1982 and 1988), gave annual masterclasses in the Swiss cities of Thun and Obersaxen.

=== Teaching ===
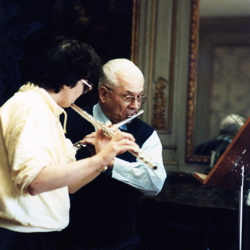
Januet during a lesson

André Jaunet was mostly remembered as a vivid, dedicated teacher. His pupils included Aurèle Nicolet, Peter-Lukas Graf, Robert Aitken, Jean-Claude Gérard and Emmanuel Pahud.

=== Solo work ===
During his life, besides occupying the principal flutist chair in the Tonhalle, he was active performing as a solo flutist with many orchestras. These included: the Zurich Chamber Orchestra (under the direction of Edmond de Stoutz), the Collegium Musicum Zürich (under conductor Paul Sacher), and the Festival Strings Lucerne (under conductor Rudolf Baumgartner).

=== Musical ensembles ===
For many years, Jaunet played with the Zürich Woodwind quintet, which included André Raoult on oboe, Rolf Kubli on clarinet, Rudolf Leuzinger on bassoon, and Werner Speth on horn. From 1947 to 1962, Jaunet was involved in baroque chamber music in the Zunfthaus zur Meise in Zürich, where he played with Hans Andreae (harpsichord), James Whitehead (cello), Claude Starck (cello), Karl Maria Schwamberger (viola da gamba), Hugues Cuenod (tenor), Hermann Leeb (lute, guitar), Heribert Lauer (violin) and others. Jaunet was also involved in performing modern works and analyzing Schoenberg's "Woodwind Quintet." In 1961, he performed Pierre Boulez's "Sonatine for flute and piano" with Maria Bergmann in Zürich's Tonhalle, in the presence of the composer.

== Awards and prizes ==
In 1931, at the age of 20, he was awarded the Paris Conservatory's First Prize for flute. In 1939 he won the First Prize at the International Music Competition of Geneva. In 1966, the French government awarded Jaunet the Legion of Honour.

== Discography ==
Although many are out of stock, Jaunet recorded several records over his career. André Jaunet: The Art of the Great Flutist is a 3-CD set that was produced posthumously, with the help of his wife, Clotilde Faillettaz Jaunet, by producer Mr. Muramatsu and Jaunet's former students, Aurèle Nicolet, Peter-Lukas Graf, Guenter Rumpel, Kiyoshi Kasai, and musician Michel Kurz. Muramatsu catalogue

Jaunet, André. Wie Meister Ueben: André Jaunet (How Masters Practice), flute, Panton Zürich Editions 1966, 120 pages. Contains two LP records in which the flutist teaches a pupil and then plays the "Andante in C major of Mozart" (pupil: Sylvia Baumann). Score for flute and piano.
