= Peter-Lukas Graf =

Swiss flutist (1929–2025)

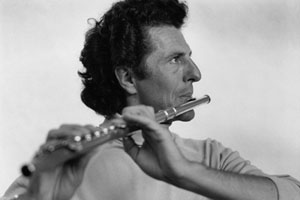
- Graf in 1970

Background information
- Born: 5 January 1929; Zürich, Switzerland
- Died: 31 December 2025 (aged 96) Binningen, Switzerland
- Occupations: Soloist, conductor, teacher
- Instrument: Flute

Peter-Lukas Graf (5 January 1929 – 31 December 2025) was a Swiss flutist.

== Life and career ==
Graf was born in Zürich, Switzerland on 5 January 1929. He was a pupil of André Jaunet, and later attended the Paris Conservatoire, where he won first prize with Marcel Moyse and Roger Cortet. Besides playing the flute both in orchestras and as a soloist, he was a conductor, and spent several years exclusively as an orchestra and opera conductor. He was also a teacher, and taught at the Basel Music Academy since 1973 and at the Music Academy Accademia Lorenzo Perosi in Biella. Graf played at James Galway's wedding in May 1972. In 2005 Graf received an honorary doctorate from the Academy of Music in Kraków.

The asteroid (5856) Peluk was named after him.

Graf died on 31 December 2025, five days before his 97th birthday.

== Discography ==
Graf made many recordings in his career.

=== Solo flute ===
- Works for Solo Flute by Johann Sebastian Bach, Marin Marais, C. P. E. Bach, Sigfrid Karg-Elert, Willy Burkhard, Edgard Varèse, Luciano Berio, and Kazuo Fukushima. (Claves 50-8005).OCLC 1150011210
- Heiner Reitz (Vol.II) 12 Caprices (Telos Music TLS 026). OCLC 1183638834
- Peter Mieg, Les plaisirs de Rued (Claves P 610). OCLC 716988565

=== Flute and orchestra ===
- Luigi Boccherini, Cimarosa, Gluck (Jecklin 506-2). OCLC 1408580942
- Devienne, Jacques Ibert, (Claves 50-501). OCLC 219354133
- Krommer (Grand Prix International du Disque) (Claves 50-8203). OCLC 1145544959
- Mozart (Claves 50-8505). OCLC 1145623020
- Mozart: Concert for flute and harp (Claves 50-0208). OCLC 913855352
- Quantz, Stamitz, Stalder (Claves 50-808-9). OCLC 1145606585
- Pergolesi, Piccinni, Mercadante (Claves 50-9103). OCLC 957971397
- Vivaldi (Claves 50-8807). OCLC 1145548794
- Reinecke, Reissiger: Romantic flute concertos (Claves 50-2108). OCLC 913855914
- Krommer: Sinfonia concertante for flute, clarinet and violin (Tudor 757). OCLC 638395433

=== Flute and harpsichord ===
- Johann Sebastian Bach (Claves 50-0401). OCLC 913855739
- Johann Sebastian Bach (Jecklin 4400/1-2). OCLC 638155664
- Handel (Claves 50-0238). OCLC 941244178

=== Flute and piano ===
- Johann Sebastian Bach: Las cinco sonatas auténticas. (Claves 50-2511). OCLC 706034944
- Schubert, Widor, Martinu, Poulenc: Clásicos para flauta Vol. 1. (Claves 50-9306). OCLC 1184037740
- Reinecke, Milhaud, Hindemith, Frank Martin, Prokofiev: Clásicos para flauta, Vol. 2. (Claves 50-9307). OCLC 1183893152
- Chaminade, Hüe, Gaubert: Joueurs de flûte (Claves 50-0704). OCLC 828807832
- Joplin (Ragtimes) (Claves 50-8715). OCLC 658615983
- Kuhlau: Sonatas (Claves 50-8705). OCLC 1145558001
- Czerny, Kuhlau: Virtuoso flute (Jecklin 577-) OCLC 990251743

=== Flute and guitar ===
- Bach, Schubert, Mozart: Transcriptions (Claves 50-9705).
- Bach, Chopin, Ibert, Mozart, Ravel, Villa-Lobos: Miniatures (Claves 50-2013).
- Carulli: 6 Serenades (Claves 50-8304).
- Giuliani, Carulli, Ibert, Ravel, Willy Burkhard (Claves 50-0408).

=== Flute and harp ===
- Rossini, Donizetti, Louis Spohr, Paganini, Fauré, Lauber: Duos (Claves 50-0708).
- Debussy, Sonata No. 2. Ravel, Introducción y Allegro: French Masterpieces. (Claves 50-0280).
- Peter Mieg, Morceau élégant (Claves P 610 y Jecklin Edition JS 314-2))

=== Chamber music ===
- F.Bach, Briccialdi: 2 flutes J.S.Bach, Kuhlau, Doppler: Trios 2 fl/piano (Claves 50-2006).
- Beethoven: Triosonata, Serenade in D major (flute, violin and viola) (Claves 50-8403).
- Reger: 2 Serenades (flute, violin and viola) (Claves 50-8104).
- Krommer: 3 flute quartets op. 17/92/93 (Claves 50-8708)
- Peter Mieg: Quintuor (flute, 2 violins, cello and harpsichord) (Claves P 610)
- Mozart: 4 quartets Carmina Quartet (Claves 50-9014).
- Mozart: 4 quartets (Ex Libris CD-6087).
- Rossini: 4 quartets (Nr. 1, 2, 4, 6). (Claves 50-8608).
- Bach: The Musical Offering (Claves 50-0198).
- Bach, Haendel, Rameau, Scarlatti, Martin, Ravel and Albert Roussel: Song Recital (K. Graf, soprano) (Claves 50-0604).
- Bach, Haendel, Quantez, Couperin, Vivaldi and Lotti: Baroque chamber music for flute, oboe and harpsichord, P.L. Graf, Goritzki and Dähler. (Claves 50-0404).
