= La Daguenière =

- Part of Loire-Authion
- Location of La Daguenière
- Location within France Location within Pays de la Loire
- Coordinates: 47°25′13″N 0°26′07″W
- Country: France
- Region: Pays de la Loire
- Department: Maine-et-Loire
- Arrondissement: Angers
- Canton: Angers-7
- Commune: Loire-Authion
- Area^{1}: 11.92 km^{2} (4.60 sq mi)
- Elevation: 23 m (75 ft)
- Highest elevation: 21 m (69 ft)
- Lowest elevation: 16 m (52 ft)
- Population (2022): 1,315
  - Density: 110.3/km^{2} (285.7/sq mi)
- Demonym(s): Daguenais, Daguenaise
- Time zone: UTC+01:00 (CET)
  - Summer (DST): UTC+02:00 (CEST)
- Postal code: 49800
- ^{1} French Land Register data, which excludes lakes, ponds, glaciers > 1 km^{2} (0.386 sq mi or 247 acres) and river estuaries.

La Daguenière (French pronunciation: [la daɡnjɛʁ]) is a former commune in the Maine-et-Loire department in western France. On 1 January 2016, it was merged into the new commune of Loire-Authion.

== See also ==
- Communes of the Maine-et-Loire department
