= Loire-Authion =

- Commune
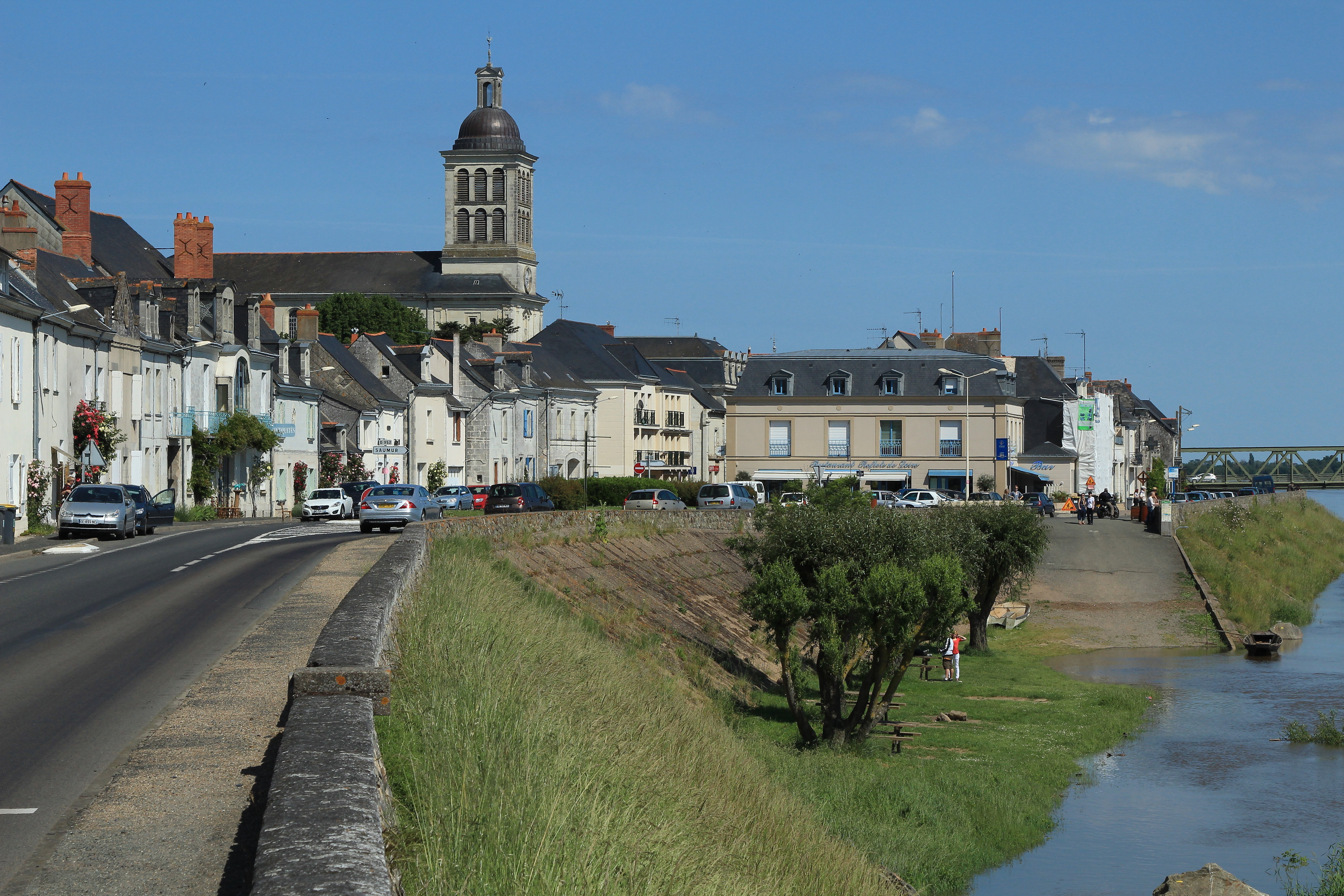
- A view of Saint-Mathurin-sur-Loire
- Location of Loire-Authion
- Location within France Location within Pays de la Loire
- Coordinates: 47°24′32″N 0°19′16″W
- Country: France
- Region: Pays de la Loire
- Department: Maine-et-Loire
- Arrondissement: Angers
- Canton: Angers-7
- Intercommunality: CU Angers Loire Métropole

Government
  - Mayor (2020–2026): Jean-Charles Prono
- Area^{1}: 113.66 km^{2} (43.88 sq mi)
- Population (2023): 16,765
  - Density: 147.50/km^{2} (382.03/sq mi)
- Time zone: UTC+01:00 (CET)
  - Summer (DST): UTC+02:00 (CEST)
- INSEE/Postal code: 49307 /49250, 49800, 49140, 49630
- ^{1} French Land Register data, which excludes lakes, ponds, glaciers > 1 km^{2} (0.386 sq mi or 247 acres) and river estuaries.

Loire-Authion (French pronunciation: [lwaʁ otjɔ̃]) is a commune in the Maine-et-Loire department of western France. The municipality was established on 1 January 2016 and consists of the former communes of Saint-Mathurin-sur-Loire, Andard, Bauné, La Bohalle, Brain-sur-l'Authion, Corné and La Daguenière. It takes its name from the two rivers Loire and Authion.

== Population ==
Historical population
Year	Pop.	±% p.a.
1968	7,346	—
1975	7,851	+0.95%
1982	10,443	+4.16%
1990	12,451	+2.22%
1999	13,565	+0.96%
2007	15,013	+1.28%
2012	15,361	+0.46%
2017	15,702	+0.44%
2023	16,765	+1.10%
Populations of the area corresponding with the commune of Loire-Authion at 1 January 2025. Source: INSEE

== See also ==
- Communes of the Maine-et-Loire department
