= Saint-Mathurin-sur-Loire =

- Part of Loire-Authion
- Location of Saint-Mathurin-sur-Loire
- Location within France Location within Pays de la Loire
- Coordinates: 47°24′50″N 0°19′04″W
- Country: France
- Region: Pays de la Loire
- Department: Maine-et-Loire
- Arrondissement: Angers
- Canton: Angers-7
- Commune: Loire-Authion
- Area^{1}: 19.85 km^{2} (7.66 sq mi)
- Elevation: 22 m (72 ft)
- Highest elevation: 22 m (72 ft)
- Lowest elevation: 18 m (59 ft)
- Population (2022): 2,543
  - Density: 128.1/km^{2} (331.8/sq mi)
- Time zone: UTC+01:00 (CET)
  - Summer (DST): UTC+02:00 (CEST)
- Postal code: 49250
- ^{1} French Land Register data, which excludes lakes, ponds, glaciers > 1 km^{2} (0.386 sq mi or 247 acres) and river estuaries.

Saint-Mathurin-sur-Loire (French pronunciation: [sɛ̃ matyʁɛ̃ syʁ lwaʁ], literally Saint-Mathurin on Loire) is a former commune in the Maine-et-Loire department in western France. On 1 January 2016, it was merged into the new commune of Loire-Authion.

== See also ==
- Communes of the Maine-et-Loire department
