= Elmar =

Elmar may refer to:

- Elmar (given name)
- Leitz Elmar, photographic lens
- N. V. Elmar, Power companies of Aruba
- Radio Elmar, a radio station in Estonia
