= La Bohalle =

- Part of Loire-Authion
- Location of La Bohalle
- Location within France Location within Pays de la Loire
- Coordinates: 47°25′27″N 0°23′11″W
- Country: France
- Region: Pays de la Loire
- Department: Maine-et-Loire
- Arrondissement: Angers
- Canton: Angers-7
- Commune: Loire-Authion
- Area^{1}: 9.35 km^{2} (3.61 sq mi)
- Elevation: 21 m (69 ft)
- Highest elevation: 21 m (69 ft)
- Lowest elevation: 16 m (52 ft)
- Population (2022): 1,140
  - Density: 122/km^{2} (316/sq mi)
- Time zone: UTC+01:00 (CET)
  - Summer (DST): UTC+02:00 (CEST)
- Postal code: 49800
- ^{1} French Land Register data, which excludes lakes, ponds, glaciers > 1 km^{2} (0.386 sq mi or 247 acres) and river estuaries.

La Bohalle (French pronunciation: [la bɔ.al]) is a former commune in the Maine-et-Loire department in western France. On 1 January 2016, it was merged into the new commune of Loire-Authion.

== Population ==
Historical population

Year	Pop.	±% p.a.
1793	1,309	—
1800	930	−4.77%
1806	879	−0.94%
1821	1,061	+1.26%
1831	1,144	+0.76%
1836	1,176	+0.55%
1841	1,210	+0.57%
1846	1,236	+0.43%
1851	1,218	−0.29%
1856	1,161	−0.95%
1861	1,103	−1.02%
1866	1,075	−0.51%
1872	1,051	−0.38%
1876	1,003	−1.16%
1881	945	−1.18%
1886	914	−0.66%
1891	789	−2.90%
1896	759	−0.77%

Year	Pop.	±% p.a.
1901	695	−1.75%
1906	740	+1.26%
1911	717	−0.63%
1921	656	−0.89%
1926	652	−0.12%
1931	635	−0.53%
1936	631	−0.13%
1946	666	+0.54%
1954	706	+0.73%
1962	685	−0.38%
1968	657	−0.69%
1975	582	−1.72%
1982	831	+5.22%
1990	1,101	+3.58%
1999	1,242	+1.35%
2006	1,240	−0.02%
2013	1,228	−0.14%
2022	1,140	−0.82%

Source: EHESS and INSEE

== See also ==
- Communes of the Maine-et-Loire department
