= N.V. Elmar =

Electric power company in Aruba

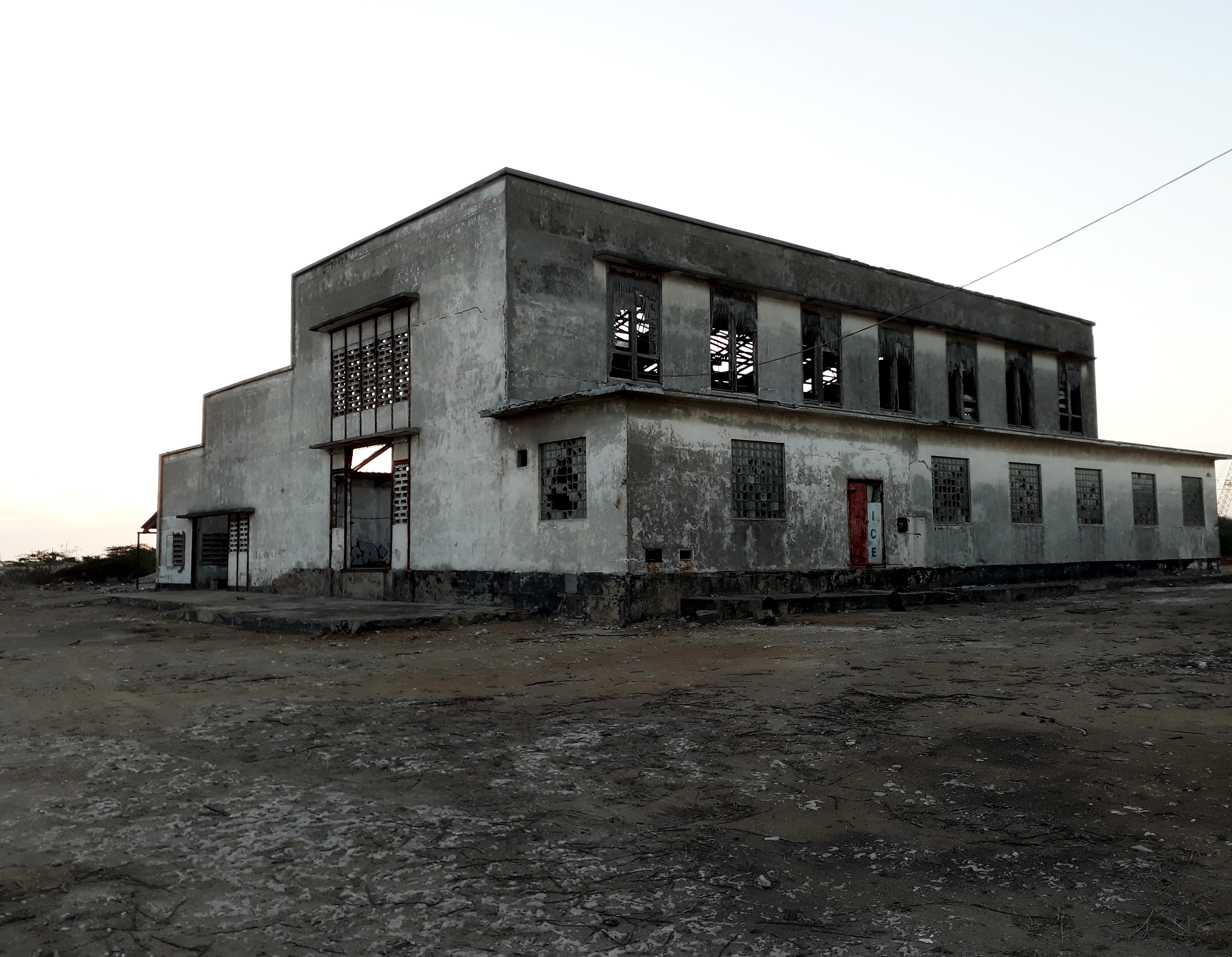
A former electrical substation of N.V. Elmar at Pos Chikito. The building has acquired the status of monument.

N.V. Elmar is the sole provider of electricity on the island of Aruba.

N.V. Elmar is an abbreviation for the full company name in Dutch: "Naamloze Vennootschap Electriciteit-Maatschappij Aruba".

The Naamloze Vennootschap, abbreviated as N.V. is the traditional Limited Liability Company with its capital divided into shares and may be compared with the Spanish S.A. and the U.S. Corporation.

== History ==
N.V. Elmar was founded on 22 June 1950. It began operation on 15 November 1950. Prior to that date, electricity distribution for the island had been provided through N.V. Electra. In June 1951, the Public Works Department presented a draft agreement to Elmar which the company did not counter until March 1952. Members of the Finance and Public Works departments met with Elmar's management on 25 September 1952 for negotiations. The Attorney General determined the agreement reached to be legally acceptable, and Elmar stated that it could be enacted retroactively to 1 January 1953 with the stipulation that it be swiftly agreed to. The agreement that Elmar returned initially contained provisions to extend the contract from 25 up to 75 years, and offered a savings of 14% of what had been paid for distribution with Electra. The executive board objected to the length as well as the high tariff imposed. In response to the tariff complaint, Elmar announced a new fee schedule that would begin on 15 May 1953. In a November meeting, other concerns with the contract were raised, including the absence of some items from the agreement which would nullify the purported forthcoming savings.

In 1956, negotiations with the N.V. OGEM included provisions for Elmar, specifically the requirement that the company purchase all residual electricity up to 4,000 kW at a rate of 2.1 Antillean cents per kWh. The agreement explicitly stated that Elmar was responsible for "uninterrupted and sufficient power supply". It stipulated that the pricing would be good for ten years and was to be tacitly extended, and included details regarding the maintenance of the power plant and high-voltage cables.

In 1960, OGEM negotiated a plan with the Netherlands to expand electric service to the whole of Aruba over a period of three years that included the construction of 50 new transformer stations, and laying more than 46,000 m (151,000 ft) of high-voltage and more than 33,000 m (108,000 ft) of low-voltage cable. The agreement included an eight-year budget of 98,100 florins. An agreement between Elmar and Aruba in which the island government agreed to pay for the expansion of electricity throughout the island was signed on 7 December 1961. Elmar began the work to connect more neighborhoods to the electrical grid in August 1962. The company connected those in which residences were more closely congregated to the grid first.

On 13 February 1964, the interim governor of Aruba, Isaac S. de Cuba, signed an agreement with Elmar which ended the 1956 contract as well as stipulating for the closure of Elmar's power plant in Balashi, which had been built in 1950.

On 17 September 1964, eight neighborhoods gained access to electricity via the Elmar power line running through Noord. The project spanned three years, used 72 tonnes of copper, and required the construction and installation of 1832 utility poles. Palm Beach, which began receiving electricity on 5 July 1965, was the final area of the grid expansion project.

In September and October 1965, customers' electric bills decreased due to a tariff reduction negotiated by the Director of Social and Economic Affairs with Elmar and OGEM. Residents received a 48.2% tariff reduction. On 29 November, the entire island experienced power loss for between thirty minutes to an hour, which Elmar stated was a result of a communication failure between equipment at Water and Energy Company (Dutch: Water en Energie-bedrijf, WEB) and Elmar's central distribution. The power failed again on 9 December, from approximately 8:45 AM until 1 PM.

Elmar built a substation in Paardenbaai in 1967.

On 19 September 1969, the island government contracted Elmar to improve the lighting of public streets throughout Aruba, increasing the number of street lights to 3,000 and upgrading them to mercury lamps.

Elmar constructed a switching station in Balashi in 1979, and a substation in Sabana Blanco in 1981. The latter two cost approximately 7 million florin, and another substation planned for Noord was expected to cost an additional 5 million.

In 1985, OGEM faced bankruptcy. The island government had been in negotiations with OGEM to purchase their shares in Elmar since 1974. Arutil N.V., backed by the MEP government, was founded for the purpose of purchasing Elmar. The Aruban Democratic Party strongly opposed the sale to the group, in part because the MEP claimed there were no funds for the government to purchase the shares from OGEM while also backing a group whose funding source they refused to disclose. On 27 August 1985, Parliament approved the Aruban People's Party's motion to have the government purchase OGEM's 85% stake in Elmar.

== Unionization ==
The Aruba Electricians Union (Papiamento: Union Electricistas Arubano) was established in October 1963.

In January 1964, the union submitted a collective labor agreement to Elmar. The parties negotiated several benefits for employees, including salary increases, a medical fund, and regulations covering employee illness. The agreement was signed on 27 August 1964, to last through 30 June 1966. Half of the Union's membership at the time worked at Elmar. By 1966, all members of the UEA worked at Elmar.

A pension agreement, including survivor's benefits, was reached on 22 February 1965.

== Sources ==
- "Aki tres anja electrici-dad pa henter Aruba" [Three years until electricity reaches all of Aruba]. Arubaanse Courant (in Papiamento). Vol. 22, no. 3919. 20 December 1960 – via Internet Archive.
- "Aruba un biaha mas sin corriente" [Aruba once more without power]. Arubaanse Courant (in Papiamento). Vol. 27. 10 December 1965 – via Internet Archive.
- "Awe Elmar lo completa plan di tres anja" [Elmar completes three year plan today]. Arubaanse Courant (in Papiamento). Vol. 27. 5 July 1965 – via Internet Archive.
- "De besprekingen met de O.G.E.M. (II): ELMAR verplicht alle restenergie af te nemen tot max. van 4000 K.W." [The discussions with the O.G.E.M. (II): ELMAR must purchase all surplus electricity up to 4,000 kW]. Arubaanse Courant (in Dutch). Vol. 18, no. 2646. 11 September 1956 – via Internet Archive.
- "Besprekingen met de O.G.E.M. (Slot): Prijsafspraak werd voor 10 jaar gemaakt" [The discussions with the O.G.E.M. (Final): 10 year price agreement]. Arubaanse Courant (in Dutch). Vol. 18, no. 2647. 11 September 1956 – via Internet Archive.
- "Bon trabao di gobierno central – corriente a baha!" [Good job central government – electricity cost reduced!]. Arubaanse Courant (in Papiamento). Vol. 27. 3 September 1965 – via Internet Archive.
- "C.C.T. PA Electricistanan" [Collective labor agreement for electricians]. Observador (in Papiamento). Vol. 4, no. 123. 11 June 1964 – via National Library of Aruba.
- "CAO onderhandelingen bij Elmar begonnen" [Collective bargaining begins at Elmar]. Amigoe di Curaçao (in Dutch). Vol. 83, no. 98. 29 April 1966 – via Internet Archive.
- "Corriente a bolbe bai na Aruba" [Electricity returned to Aruba]. Arubaanse Courant (in Papiamento). Vol. 27. 1 December 1965 – via Internet Archive.
- "Eilandraad acht duur concessie Elmar te groot" [Island Council finds the duration of Elmar's concession excessive]. De Arubaanse Courant (in Dutch). Vol. 11, no. 1582. 11 March 1953 – via Internet Archive.
- "Electricistanan kier bai traha segun Gombieno" [According to Gombieno electricians want to go to work]. Observdao (in Papiamento). Vol. 4, no. 104. 16 January 1964 – via National Library of Aruba.
- "Elmar kondigt nieuw tarief aan" [Elmar announces new tariff]. De Arubaanse Courant (in Dutch). Vol. 12, no. 1613. 18 April 1953 – via Internet Archive.
- "Elmar moet wachten" [Elmar must wait]. De Arubaanse Courant (in Dutch). Vol. 11, no. 1549. 31 January 1953 – via Internet Archive.
- "Fel tegen aankoop door een MEP-groep" [Strongly opposing purchase by MEP group]. Amigoe (in Dutch). Vol. 102, no. 161. 17 July 1985 – via Internet Archive.
- "E foto aki ta mustra nos d.r.p:d: srs: Robert Naar (UEA), Eddy Maduro (UEA), W.H. Hoekstra (Elmar) J.H. Da Costa (Elmar) na momento cu diabier-na pasa un contracto colectivo di trabau a ser firma entre e compañia di electricidad y e electricistanan den su servicio" [This photo shows the moment last Thursday when Robert Naar (UEA), Eddy Maduro (UEA), W.H. Hoekstra (Elmar), and J.H. Da Costa (Elmar) signed a collective labor agreement]. Observador (in Papiamento). Vol. 4, no. 133. 29 August 1964 – via National Library of Aruba.
- "Geen verlichting" [No lighting]. Amigoe di Curaçao (in Dutch). 24 May 1951 – via Internet Archive.
- "Gewisselde stukken tussen Raad en Bestuur" [Documents exchanged between the Council and the Board]. De Arubaanse Courant (in Dutch). Vol. 12, no. 1779. 10 November 1953 – via Internet Archive.
- "Gobierno ta entrega coriente na Elmar" [Government delivers electricity to Elmar]. Observador (in Papiamento). Vol. 4, no. 109. 20 February 1964 – via National Library of Aruba.
- "Gobierno ta percura pa luz den tur Districto" [Government procures street lights for all Districts]. Aruba Noticiero oficial di Gobierno Insular (in Papiamento). Vol. 12, no. 4. December 1969 – via National Library of Aruba.
- "Mensahe di Gobierno" [Message from the Government]. Aruba Noticiero oficial di Gobierno Insular (in Papiamento). Vol. 13, no. 3. December 1970. pp. 2–7 – via National Library of Aruba.
- N.V. Electriciteit-Maatschappij "Aruba" (Elmar) Jaarverslag 1951 [N.V. Electriciteit-Maatschappij "Aruba" (Elmar) Annual Report 1951] (Report) (in Dutch). 1952 – via Internet Archive.
- "Nieuwe straatverlichtingsovereenkomst bespaart eiland" [New street lighting agreement will save island money]. De Arubaanse Courant (in Dutch). Vol. 11, no. 1546. 28 January 1953 – via Internet Archive.
- "Noord a hanje Electrificacion" [Noord to receive Electrification]. Observador (in Papiamento). Vol. 4, no. 137. 25 September 1964. pp. 1, 3, 10 – via National Library of Aruba.
- "Noticia local" [Local news]. Observador (in Papiamento). Vol. 5, no. 175. 9 July 1965 – via National Library of Aruba.
- "Noticianan local" [Local news]. Observador (in Papiamento). Vol. 4, no. 112. 12 March 1964. pp. 5–7 – via National Library of Aruba.
- "Parlamento a aproba pa Elmar pasa den man di Gobierno" [Parliament approves Government purchase of Elmar]. Diario (in Papiamento). Vol. 4, no. 1408. 28 August 1985 – via Internet Archive.
- "PDA kier pa gobierno cumpra Elmar" [PDA recommends government buy Elmar]. Diario (in Papiamento). Vol. 4, no. 320. 17 May 1985 – via Internet Archive.
- "PDA ta exigi gobierno pa no permiti Artuil cumpra Elmar" [PDA requires that the government prevent Artuil from buying Elmar]. Diario (in Papiamento). Vol. 4, no. 1371. 17 July 1985 – via Internet Archive.
- "Reglamento di pensioen na Elmar" [Elmar pension regulations]. Arubaanse Courant (in Papiamento). Vol. 26, no. 5266. 23 February 1965 – via Internet Archive.
- "Substancia electrico na Sabana Blanco a keda inaugura door di Diputado de Kort" [Electrical substation in Sabana Blanco inaugurated by Deputy de Kort]. Aruba Noticiero oficial di Gobierno Insular (in Papiamento). Vol. 5, no. 3. December 1981 – via National Library of Aruba.
- "De Union electricistas Arubano (UEA) de vakbond van bij de Elmar werkzame personen, herdacht in het weekeinde zijn 15-jarig bestaan" [The Aruba Electricians Union (UEA), the trade union of Elmar employees, commemorated its 15th anniversary this weekend.]. Amigoe (in Dutch). Vol. 95, no. 241. 24 October 1978 – via Internet Archive.
- Eman, J.H.A. (5 September 1985). "Ingezonden: AVP-motie" [Submitted: AVP-motion]. Amigoe (in Dutch). Vol. 102, no. 204 – via Internet Archive.
