= Andard =

- Part of Loire-Authion
- Location of Andard
- Location within France Location within Pays de la Loire
- Coordinates: 47°27′27″N 0°23′45″W
- Country: France
- Region: Pays de la Loire
- Department: Maine-et-Loire
- Arrondissement: Angers
- Canton: Angers-7
- Commune: Loire-Authion
- Area^{1}: 11.99 km^{2} (4.63 sq mi)
- Elevation: 24 m (79 ft)
- Highest elevation: 38 m (125 ft)
- Lowest elevation: 16 m (52 ft)
- Population (2022): 3,049
  - Density: 254.3/km^{2} (658.6/sq mi)
- Time zone: UTC+01:00 (CET)
  - Summer (DST): UTC+02:00 (CEST)
- Postal code: 49800
- ^{1} French Land Register data, which excludes lakes, ponds, glaciers > 1 km^{2} (0.386 sq mi or 247 acres) and river estuaries.

Andard (French pronunciation: [ɑ̃daʁ]) is a former commune in the Maine-et-Loire department in western France. On 1 January 2016, it was merged into the new commune of Loire-Authion.

== Population ==
Historical population

Year	Pop.	±% p.a.
1793	1,150	—
1800	1,084	−0.84%
1806	1,139	+0.83%
1821	1,153	+0.08%
1831	1,123	−0.26%
1836	1,168	+0.79%
1841	1,127	−0.71%
1846	1,122	−0.09%
1851	1,106	−0.29%
1856	1,140	+0.61%
1861	1,105	−0.62%
1866	1,066	−0.72%
1872	1,068	+0.03%
1876	1,049	−0.45%
1881	1,012	−0.72%
1886	993	−0.38%
1891	968	−0.51%
1896	1,006	+0.77%

Year	Pop.	±% p.a.
1901	967	−0.79%
1906	940	−0.56%
1911	889	−1.11%
1921	822	−0.78%
1926	842	+0.48%
1931	839	−0.07%
1936	848	+0.21%
1946	924	+0.86%
1954	953	+0.39%
1962	1,016	+0.80%
1968	1,024	+0.13%
1975	1,261	+3.02%
1982	1,758	+4.86%
1990	2,085	+2.16%
1999	2,184	+0.52%
2007	2,441	+1.40%
2012	2,501	+0.49%
2022	3,049	+2.00%

Source: EHESS and INSEE

== See also ==
- Communes of the Maine-et-Loire department
