= National Archives of Aruba =

Coordinates: 12.5074°N 70.0094°W

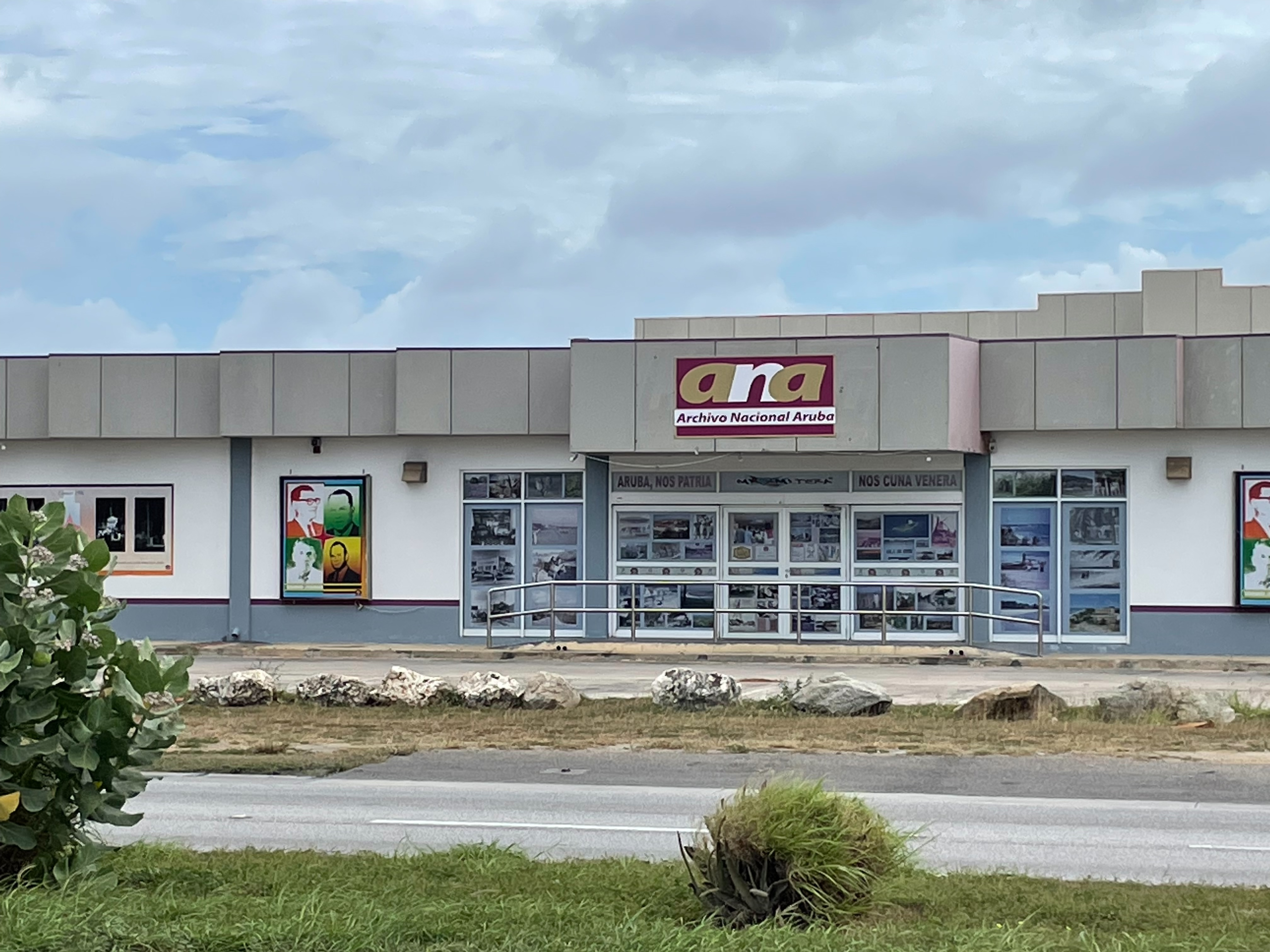
National Archives of Aruba

The National Archives of Aruba (Dutch: Nationaal Archief van Aruba; Papiamento: Archivo Nacional Aruba) are located in Oranjestad, Aruba.

Archivo Nacional Aruba (ANA) was established in August 1994 as Aruba’s official records keeper and is considered a vital component to the past, present and future of the island. ANA’s role is to ensure the longevity, accessibility and authenticity of Aruba’s (historical) information, and to preserve this information both analogically and digitally for generations to come. Core Responsibilities include, but are not limited to:

1. Centrally manage public and/or private records in the interest of historical research and cultural heritage;
2. Make historical public records accessible and available to be used for (academic) research purposes;
3. Provide information related to (historical) records available in the archive repository;
4. Edit and publish important historical records in publications to allow the community to discover, use and learn from this information;
5. Stimulate community interest in the history of Aruba;
6. Monitor and provide guidelines based on archiving procedures and laws to ensure (semi) government departments are complying;

== See also ==
- List of national archives
- National Library of Aruba
