= Corné =

- Part of Loire-Authion
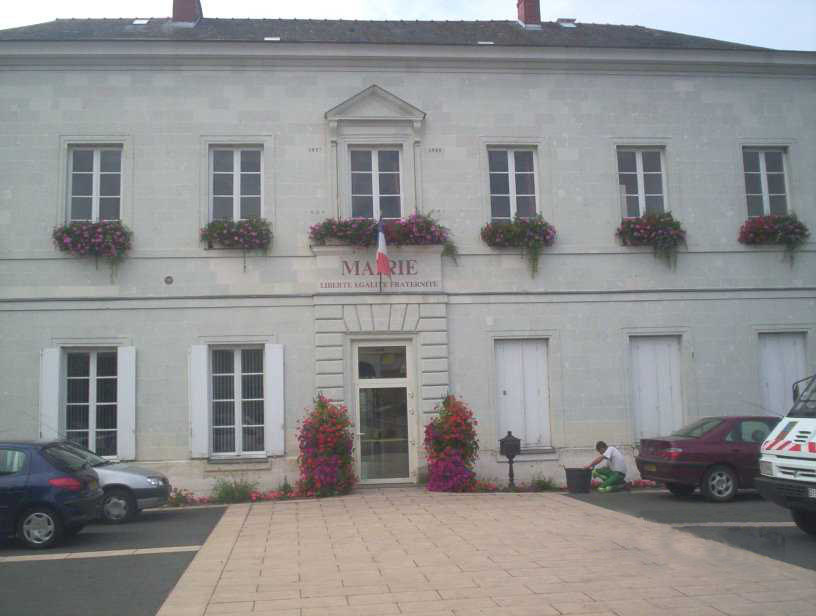
- La Mairie de Corné

- Coat of arms
- Location of Corné
- Location within France Location within Pays de la Loire
- Coordinates: 47°28′17″N 0°20′54″W
- Country: France
- Region: Pays de la Loire
- Department: Maine-et-Loire
- Arrondissement: Angers
- Canton: Angers-7
- Commune: Loire-Authion
- Area^{1}: 16.64 km^{2} (6.42 sq mi)
- Elevation: 39 m (128 ft)
- Highest elevation: 60 m (200 ft)
- Lowest elevation: 16 m (52 ft)
- Population (2022): 3,252
  - Density: 195.4/km^{2} (506.2/sq mi)
- Demonym(s): Cornéais, Cornéaise
- Time zone: UTC+01:00 (CET)
  - Summer (DST): UTC+02:00 (CEST)
- Postal code: 49630
- Website: www.corne.fr
- ^{1} French Land Register data, which excludes lakes, ponds, glaciers > 1 km^{2} (0.386 sq mi or 247 acres) and river estuaries.

Corné (French pronunciation: [kɔʁne]) is a former commune in the Maine-et-Loire department in western France. On 1 January 2016, it was merged into the new commune of Loire-Authion.

== See also ==
- Communes of the Maine-et-Loire department
