= Brain-sur-l'Authion =

- Part of Loire-Authion
- Location of Brain-sur-l'Authion
- Location within France Location within Pays de la Loire
- Coordinates: 47°26′48″N 0°24′34″W
- Country: France
- Region: Pays de la Loire
- Department: Maine-et-Loire
- Arrondissement: Angers
- Canton: Angers-7
- Commune: Loire-Authion
- Area^{1}: 22.92 km^{2} (8.85 sq mi)
- Elevation: 21 m (69 ft)
- Highest elevation: 43 m (141 ft)
- Lowest elevation: 15 m (49 ft)
- Population (2022): 3,440
  - Density: 150/km^{2} (389/sq mi)
- Time zone: UTC+01:00 (CET)
  - Summer (DST): UTC+02:00 (CEST)
- Postal code: 49800
- ^{1} French Land Register data, which excludes lakes, ponds, glaciers > 1 km^{2} (0.386 sq mi or 247 acres) and river estuaries.

Brain-sur-l'Authion (French pronunciation: [bʁɛ̃ syʁ lotjɔ̃]) is a former commune in the Maine-et-Loire department in western France. On 1 January 2016, it was merged into the new commune of Loire-Authion.

== Population ==
Historical population

Year	Pop.	±% p.a.
1793	1,792	—
1800	1,338	−4.09%
1806	1,341	+0.04%
1821	1,490	+0.70%
1831	1,596	+0.69%
1836	1,637	+0.51%
1841	1,614	−0.28%
1846	1,637	+0.28%
1851	1,647	+0.12%
1856	1,622	−0.31%
1861	1,575	−0.59%
1866	1,636	+0.76%
1872	1,540	−1.00%
1876	1,460	−1.32%
1881	1,435	−0.34%
1886	1,389	−0.65%
1891	1,394	+0.07%
1896	1,379	−0.22%

Year	Pop.	±% p.a.
1901	1,393	+0.20%
1906	1,257	−2.03%
1911	1,310	+0.83%
1921	1,137	−1.41%
1926	1,086	−0.91%
1931	1,150	+1.15%
1936	1,170	+0.35%
1946	1,219	+0.41%
1954	1,473	+2.39%
1962	1,278	−1.76%
1968	1,314	+0.46%
1975	1,587	+2.73%
1982	2,190	+4.71%
1990	2,622	+2.28%
1999	2,803	+0.74%
2006	3,351	+2.58%
2013	3,438	+0.37%
2022	3,440	+0.01%

Source: EHESS and INSEE

== See also ==
- Communes of the Maine-et-Loire department
