= Authion =

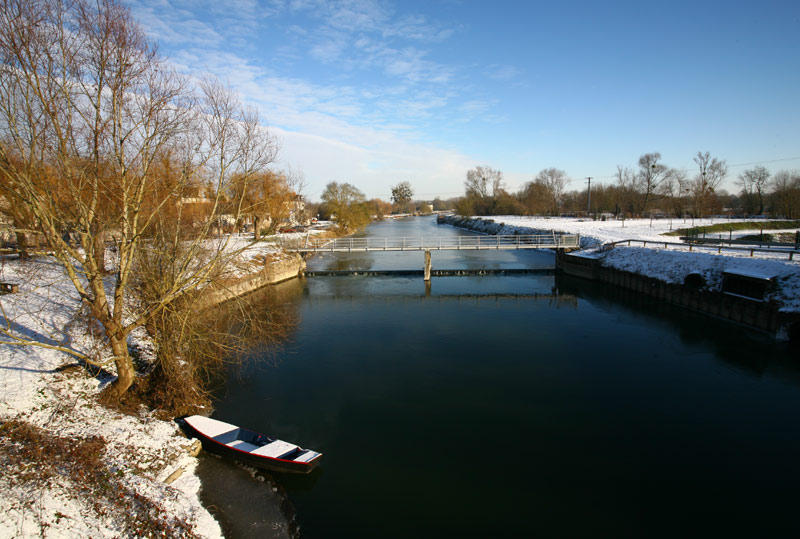
- The Authion in Brain-sur-l'Authion

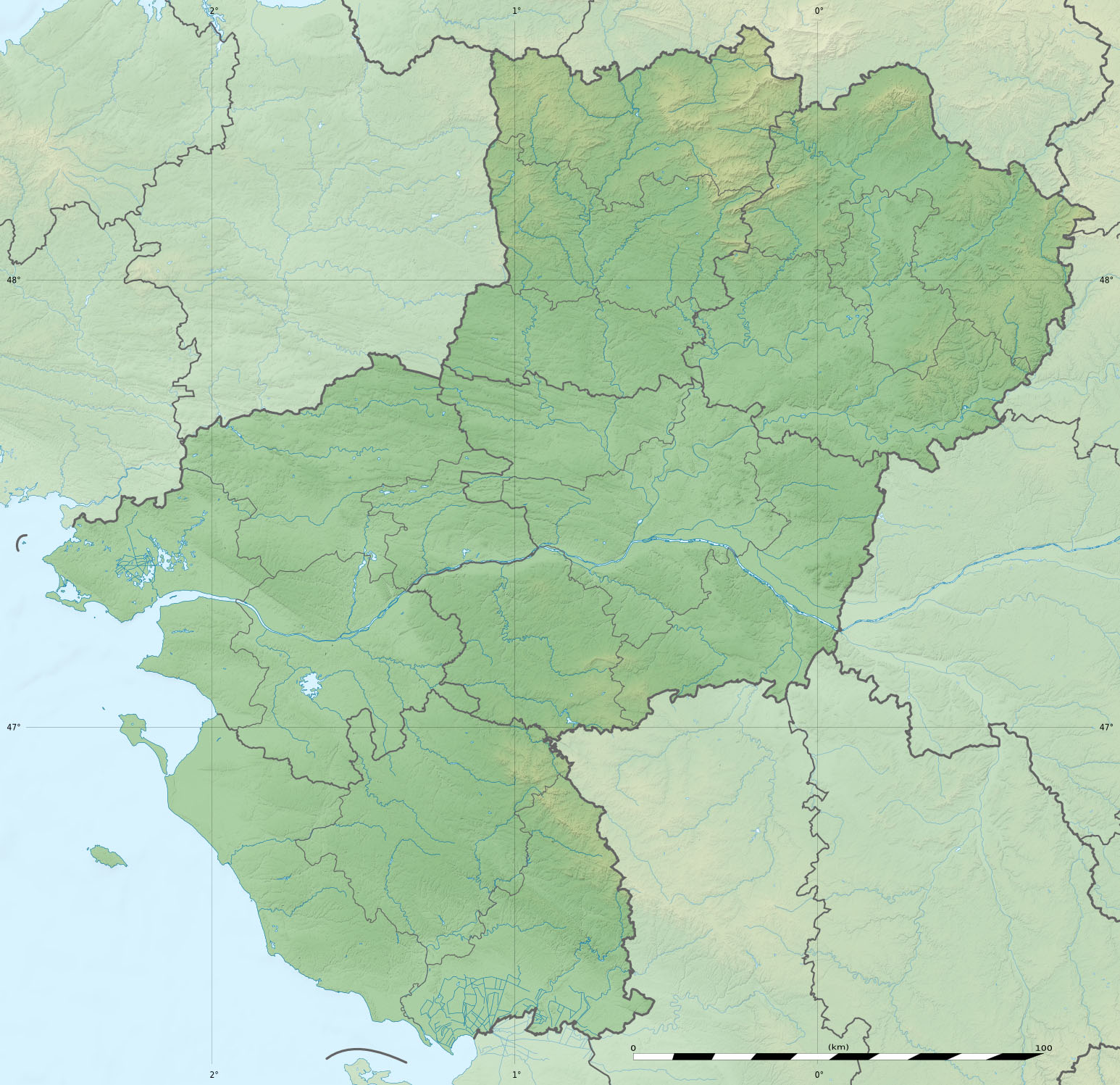
- Location within Pays de la Loire Location within France

Location
- Country: France

Physical characteristics
- Mouth: Loire
  - coordinates: 47°25′17″N 0°33′09″W
- Length: 99.8 km (62.0 mi)
- Basin size: 1,497 km^{2} (578 sq mi)

Basin features
- Progression: Loire→ Atlantic Ocean

The Authion (French pronunciation: [otjɔ̃]) is a 99.8 km (62.0 mi) long river in western France located in the departments of Indre-et-Loire (Centre-Val de Loire) and Maine-et-Loire (Pays de la Loire). It is a tributary of the river Loire on the right side. It flows into the Loire in Sainte-Gemmes-sur-Loire, near Angers. Its longest tributaries are the Lathan and the Couasnon. The largest towns on the Authion are Bourgueil, Mazé-Milon, Brain-sur-l'Authion, Trélazé and Les Ponts-de-Cé. Its basin area is 1,497 km^{2} (578 sq mi).
