= Raymond Breton =

French Dominican missionary and linguist

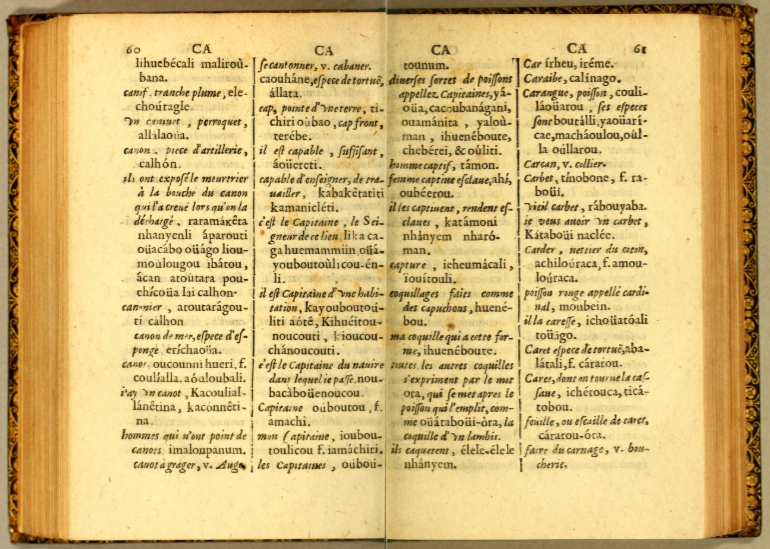
The term Calínago in Breton's Dictionaire francois-caraibe, 1666.

Raymond Breton, OP (Baune, 3 September 1609 – Caen, 8 January 1679) was a French Dominican missionary and linguist among the Caribbean Indians, and in particular the Garifuna (formerly known as Black Caribs to Europeans, and as Callinago amongst themselves).

== Life ==
Breton entered the Order of St. Dominic at the age of seventeen and was sent (1627) to the priory of St. Jacques, at Paris, to finish his classical education and make his course of philosophy and theology. Having obtained his degree in theology, he sailed with three other Dominicans for the French West Indies in 1635, and was among the first Europeans to live on Guadeloupe.

Breton devoted nearly twenty years to missionary activity in the Antilles. From 1641 to 1651 he was on Dominica, living with the Kalinago. He also spent time going from island to island, teaching and evangelizing the Natives in their own tongue, through which he became an adept in the various Carib languages. According to Breton, he arrived on Saint Vincent at one point, but did not stay because local Caribs had killed two prior proselytizers.

Returning to France in 1654, he devoted much of his time to preparing young priests for the West Indian missions.

== Works ==
Breton was responsible for the following works:

- A Catechism of the Christian Doctrine in Carib (Auxerre, 1664);
- A French-Carib and Carib-French dictionary, with copious notes, historical and explanatory, on what Breton took to be the Carib language (ibid., 1665) - linguist Douglas Macrae Taylor stated that it was "quite clear that the language described by Breton (in the Lesser Antilles) was Arawak, not Carib (though containing many Carib elements)";
- a Carib grammar (ibid., 1667).

At the request of the general of the order, he also wrote a valued history of the first years of the French Dominicans' missionary work among the Caribbean Indians:

- Relatio Gestorum a primis Praedicatorum missionariis in insulis Americanis ditionis gallicae praesertim apud Indos indigenas quos Caribes vulgo dicunt ab anno 1634 ad annum 1643 (MSS).

This is of historical importance, and has been used by several writers.
