= Bauné =

- Part of Loire-Authion
- Location of Bauné
- Location within France Location within Pays de la Loire
- Coordinates: 47°29′59″N 0°19′07″W
- Country: France
- Region: Pays de la Loire
- Department: Maine-et-Loire
- Arrondissement: Angers
- Canton: Angers-7
- Commune: Loire-Authion
- Area^{1}: 20.99 km^{2} (8.10 sq mi)
- Elevation: 28 m (92 ft)
- Highest elevation: 76 m (249 ft)
- Lowest elevation: 22 m (72 ft)
- Population (2022): 1,849
  - Density: 88.09/km^{2} (228.2/sq mi)
- Time zone: UTC+01:00 (CET)
  - Summer (DST): UTC+02:00 (CEST)
- Postal code: 49140
- ^{1} French Land Register data, which excludes lakes, ponds, glaciers > 1 km^{2} (0.386 sq mi or 247 acres) and river estuaries.

Bauné (French pronunciation: [bone]) is a former commune in the Maine-et-Loire department in western France. On 1 January 2016, it was merged into the new commune of Loire-Authion.

== Population ==
Historical population

Year	Pop.	±% p.a.
1793	1,254	—
1800	1,196	−0.67%
1806	1,317	+1.62%
1821	1,180	−0.73%
1831	1,197	+0.14%
1836	1,209	+0.20%
1841	1,109	−1.71%
1846	1,081	−0.51%
1851	1,047	−0.64%
1856	1,090	+0.81%
1861	1,038	−0.97%
1866	1,014	−0.47%
1872	1,002	−0.20%
1876	983	−0.48%
1881	952	−0.64%
1886	983	+0.64%
1891	932	−1.06%
1896	890	−0.92%

Year	Pop.	±% p.a.
1901	884	−0.14%
1906	807	−1.81%
1911	805	−0.05%
1921	689	−1.54%
1926	712	+0.66%
1931	714	+0.06%
1936	722	+0.22%
1946	641	−1.18%
1954	735	+1.73%
1962	615	−2.20%
1968	563	−1.46%
1975	502	−1.62%
1982	901	+8.71%
1990	1,142	+3.01%
1999	1,290	+1.36%
2006	1,419	+1.37%
2022	1,849	+1.67%

Source: EHESS and INSEE

== See also ==
- Communes of the Maine-et-Loire department
