= La Ménitré =

- Commune
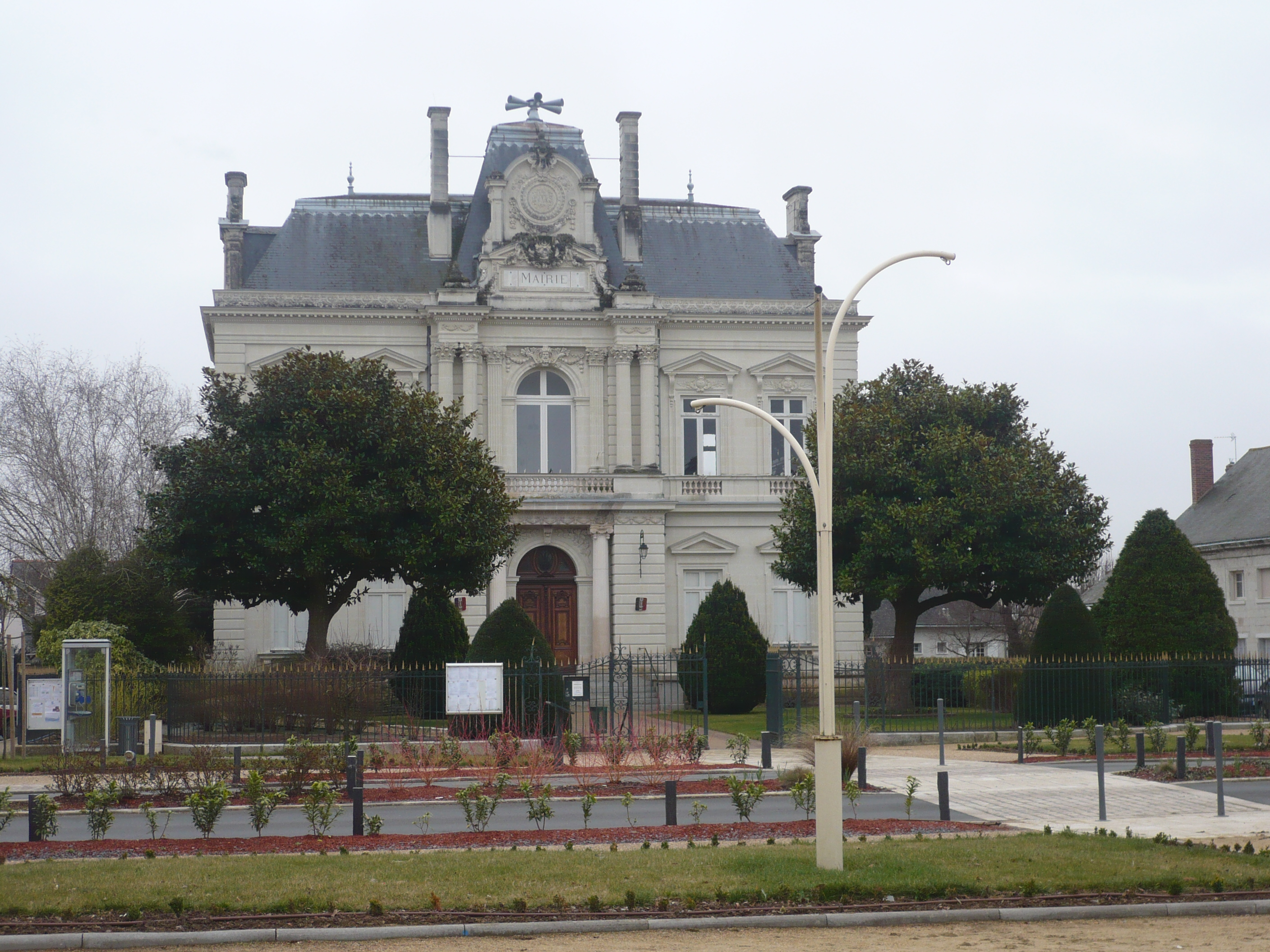
- The town hall of La Ménitré

- Coat of arms
- Location of La Ménitré
- Location within France Location within Pays de la Loire
- Coordinates: 47°24′12″N 0°16′02″W
- Country: France
- Region: Pays de la Loire
- Department: Maine-et-Loire
- Arrondissement: Saumur
- Canton: Angers-7

Government
  - Mayor (2020–2026): Tony Guery
- Area^{1}: 17.37 km^{2} (6.71 sq mi)
- Elevation: 22 m (72 ft)
- Highest elevation: 25 m (82 ft)
- Lowest elevation: 17 m (56 ft)
- Population (2023): 2,079
  - Density: 119.7/km^{2} (310.0/sq mi)
- Demonym(s): Ménitréen, Ménitréenne
- Time zone: UTC+01:00 (CET)
  - Summer (DST): UTC+02:00 (CEST)
- INSEE/Postal code: 49201 /49250
- Website: www.lamenitre.fr
- ^{1} French Land Register data, which excludes lakes, ponds, glaciers > 1 km^{2} (0.386 sq mi or 247 acres) and river estuaries.

La Ménitré (French pronunciation: [la menitʁe]) is a commune in the Maine-et-Loire department in western France.

== Population ==
Historical population
Year	Pop.	±% p.a.
1968	1,179	—
1975	1,503	+3.53%
1982	1,708	+1.84%
1990	1,780	+0.52%
1999	1,899	+0.72%
2007	2,071	+1.09%
2012	2,124	+0.51%
2017	2,072	−0.49%
2023	2,079	+0.06%
Source: INSEE

== See also ==
- Communes of the Maine-et-Loire department
