= Sarrigné =

- Commune
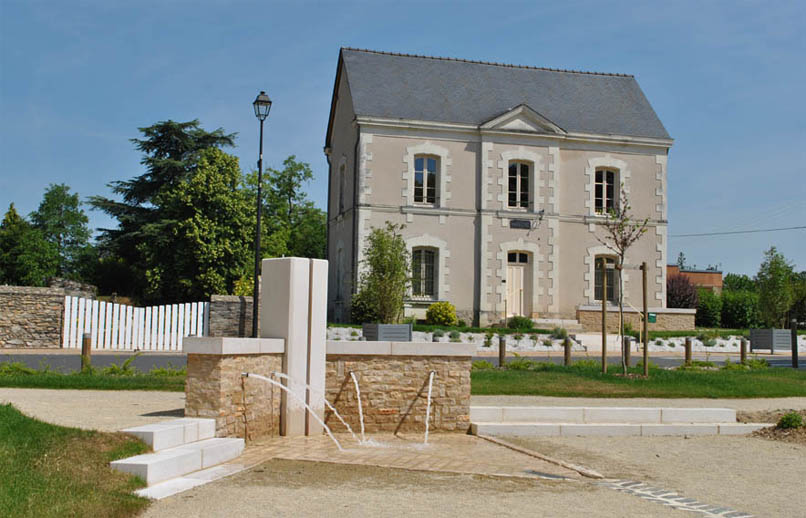
- The centre of Sarrigné
- Location of Sarrigné
- Location within France Location within Pays de la Loire
- Coordinates: 47°30′07″N 0°22′59″W
- Country: France
- Region: Pays de la Loire
- Department: Maine-et-Loire
- Arrondissement: Angers
- Canton: Angers-7
- Intercommunality: CU Angers Loire Métropole

Government
  - Mayor (2020–2026): Sébastien Bodusseau
- Area^{1}: 2.97 km^{2} (1.15 sq mi)
- Elevation: 56 m (184 ft)
- Highest elevation: 57 m (187 ft)
- Lowest elevation: 22 m (72 ft)
- Population (2023): 935
  - Density: 315/km^{2} (815/sq mi)
- Time zone: UTC+01:00 (CET)
  - Summer (DST): UTC+02:00 (CEST)
- INSEE/Postal code: 49326 /49800
- ^{1} French Land Register data, which excludes lakes, ponds, glaciers > 1 km^{2} (0.386 sq mi or 247 acres) and river estuaries.

Sarrigné (French pronunciation: [saʁiɲe]) is a commune in the Maine-et-Loire department in western France.

== See also ==
- Communes of the Maine-et-Loire department
