= Howard Griffiths (conductor) =

British conductor (born 1950)

Howard Griffiths (born 24 February 1950) is a British conductor.

Griffiths was born in Hastings. He studied music at the Royal College of Music, London.

He has lived in Switzerland since 1981. From 1996 to 2006, he was chief conductor and artistic director of the Zurich Chamber Orchestra (Zürcher Kammerorchester, ZKO). Griffiths is a champion of music by contemporary Turkish and Swiss composers. With the ZKO, he has also conducted works in a classical and classical modern range, including CDs of Haydn's Creation, symphonies by Mozart and Ferdinand Ries and works by Beethoven, Pleyel, Cherubini and Handel. He has recorded over 60 CDs under various labels.

In the UK, Griffiths was principal guest conductor of the Oxford Orchestra da Camera from 1994 to 1997. He has also been artistic director of the Orpheum Foundation for the Promotion of Young Soloists since 2000. He was appointed MBE in the 2006 New Year Honours.

From 2007 to 2018 Howard Griffiths was chief conductor of the Brandenburgisches Staatsorchester (BSOF) in Frankfurt (Oder).

Griffiths is married to the Turkish violist Semra Griffiths, who plays in the Zurich Opera orchestra. Their son Kevin Griffiths is a conductor.

Cultural offices
| Preceded by Edmond de Stoutz | Artistic Director, Zurich Chamber Orchestra; 1996-2006 | Succeeded by Muhai Tang |
