= Johan Hartog =

Dutch historian

Dr. Johannes Hartog OON
- Born: May 16, 1912; Baarn
- Died: May 20, 1997 (aged 85); Salzburg
- Other name: Johan Hartog
- Education: Western University (Ph.D.)
- Occupations: Editor-in-chief (1940–1946); Librarian (1950–1972); Historian writer
- Known for: Dutch Caribbean History
- Successor: C.M.J. Dony
- Board member of: CCA; CCC
- Spouse: Elizabeth Hartog-Wouters (m. 1948)

Signature
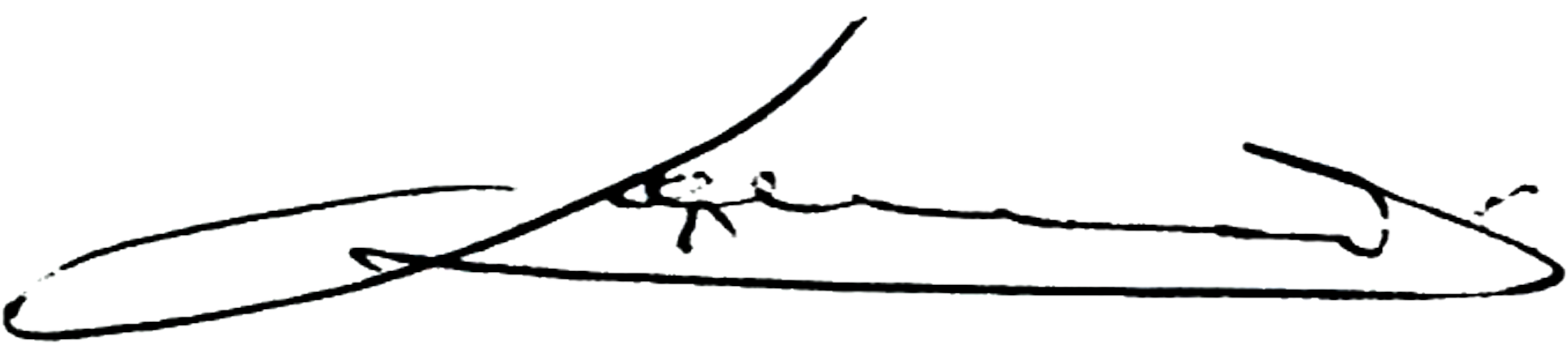

Johannes Hartog (Dutch: [ˈjoːɧan ˈɧartɔx]; Baarn, 16 May 1912 – Salzburg, 20 May 1997) was the first editor-in-chief of the bi-weekly news magazine, Amigoe di Curaçao, served from 1940 to 1946. Under his leadership, Amigoe transitioned into a daily newspaper in March 1941.

From 1950 to 1972, after his tenure at the newspaper, Hartog assumed the role of director and librarian of the Public Library of Aruba. His dedication played a vital role in establishment of the library. He received recognition for his numerous achievements, with a notable focus on his significant contributions to the field of history, particularly his publications on Dutch Caribbean history.

== Biography ==
Johannes Hartog was born in Baarn on May 16, 1912, into a devout Protestant family, later converting to Catholicism. He attended grammar school and pursued studies in history. In 1937, at the age of twenty-five, he earned his Ph.D. from Western University in London with a thesis on church history titled "The Sacrifice of the Church".

Initially, he intended to become an orientalist and enrolled as a post-graduate student at the Oriental Institute in Rome, specializing in the Balkans. However, the outbreak of the Second World War disrupted his studies, leading him to leave Italy and eventually find his way to Curaçao, where his brother was residing.

Hartog arrived in Curaçao after June 1940. Monseigneur (Mgr.) Petrus Innocentius Verriet, the bishop, entrusted him with the leadership of the Missionary publication, Amigoe di Curaçao. In June 1946, Hartog requested an honorable discharge and continued to manage the newspaper until a successor could take over.

Authorities mysteriously refused him the required papers to re-enter the territory, despite his significant contributions to journalism and social welfare. On Monday, November 4, 1946, Hartog left Curaçao on the Norwegian tanker Evita. A successor, C.M.J. Dony, mayor of Huissen (1934–1947), was appointed in November 1946. In 1947, the acting Attorney General personally informed Hartog that he may be readmitted in the normal manner at a later date.

In 1948, Hartog married Elisabeth Wouters, a teacher, nurse, and daughter of the former governor G.J.J. Wouters of the Netherlands Antilles (1936–1942).

In 1948, with the initiative of the board of Stichting voor Culturele Samenwerking (Sticusa or Foundation for Cultural Cooperation), Hartog played a key role in establishing the Cultural Center Aruba (CCA) and Cultural Center Curaçao (CCC). From 1950 to 1972, after his tenure at the Amigoe, Hartog served as the librarian at the Public Library of Aruba and authored and published approximately sixty books.

== Journalistic work ==
=== Cultural Centers ===
In 1949, Hartog assumed the role of the head of the Cultural Center Curaçao, responsible for overseeing the Sticusa between the Netherlands, Indonesia, Suriname and the Antilles.

=== Historian author ===
Alongside his role as the library director, Johan Hartog authored and published not only historical works but also travel accounts and narratives. The catalyst for major historical works about Aruba and the Dutch Antilles came from book dealer Dirk Jan de Wit. He approached Johan Hartog to write a book about Aruba due to the existing interest among the local population and Lago employees.

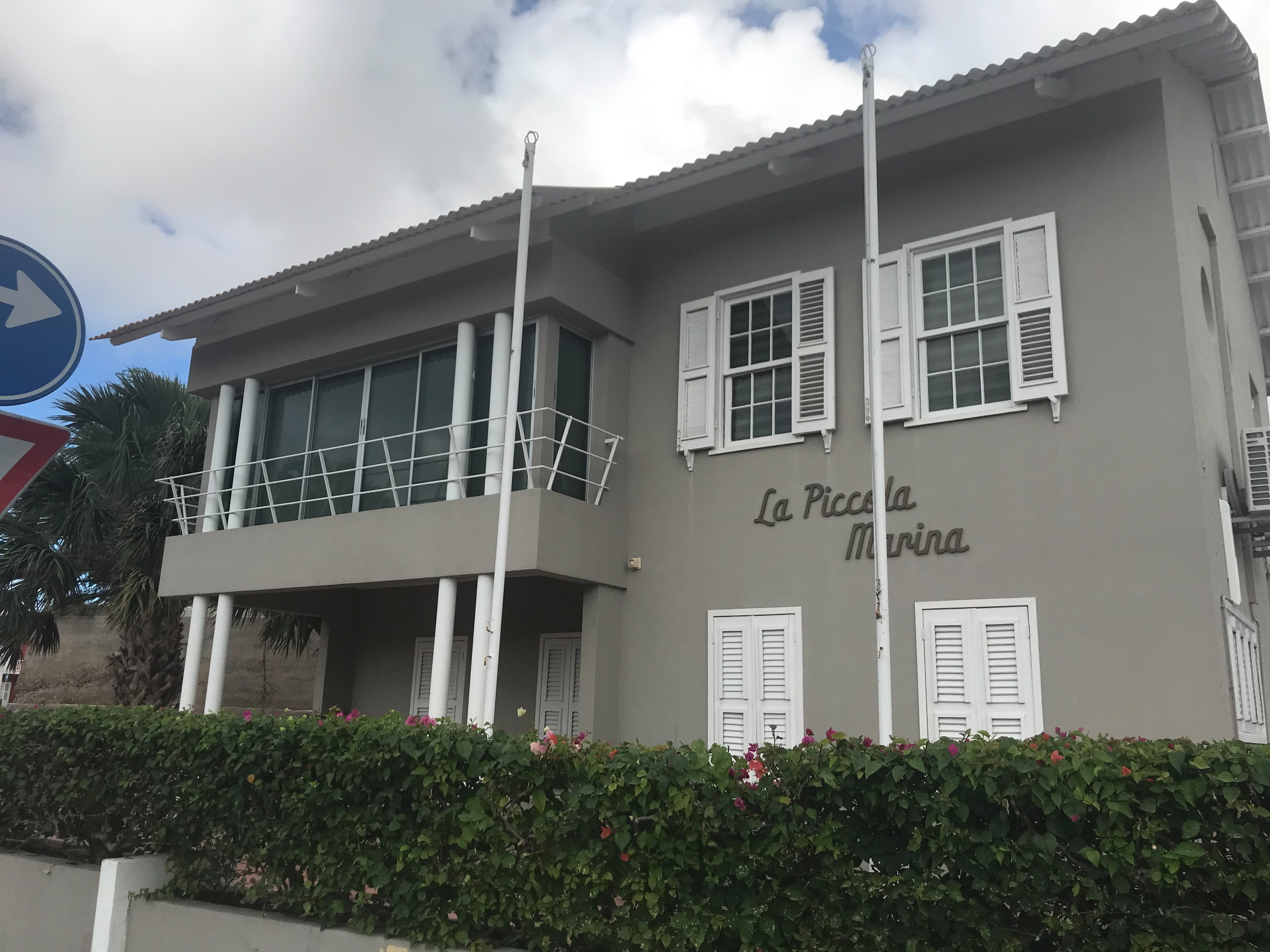
Hartog's former home, La Piccola Marina (Oranjestad). The house is named after a bay on the island of Capri where they spent their honeymoon in 1948.

== Additional works ==
During his time in Curaçao, Dr. Hartog assumed multiple significant roles alongside his leadership of Amigoe. He served as the Chairman of the Curaçao Press Association, a board member of the Mgr. Niewindt association, and contributed editorials to Lux (1943–1946), a Catholic Curaçao magazine. Furthermore, he held positions on the supervisory board of the Public Library, served as Secretary of the Fagginger Auer Committee, and actively participated in committees related to the establishment of the Curaçao Museum and various other projects. Dr. Hartog also made valuable contributions to Curaçao's education as a teacher in the Catholic primary teacher training course.

== Distinctions ==
Johan Hartog's extensive body of work has established him as a trailblazer in Aruban and Antillean historiography. His contributions earned him several awards.

- Colombia: Honorary member of the Sociedad Bolivariana
- Colombia: Honorary member of the Historical Society
- Venezuela: Honorary member of the Historical Society
- Netherlands: Knight in the Order of Oranje-Nassau
- Netherlands: Officer in the Order of Oranje-Nassau

== Published works ==
- Kroniek (Chronicle) (1938)
- De paasnacht in Oost-Europa door Dr. Joh. Hartog. (Easter Night in Eastern Europe by Dr. John Hartog.) (1943)
- Dr. Schaepman 1844 - 2 maart - 1944 (Dr. Schaepman 1844 - March 2 - 1944) (1943)
- De openbare eredienst door Dr. Joh. Hartog (The public worship by Dr. John Hartog) (1943)
- Journalistiek leven in Curaçao (Journalism life in Curaçao) (1944)
- Zweedse herinneringen in Caraïbië door Dr. Joh Hartog (Swedish memories in the Caribbean by Dr. Joh Hartog) (1944)
- De betekenis van het Kerkelijk Jaar door Dr. Joh. Hartog (The Meaning of the Church Year by Dr. John Hartog) (1944)
- De jaarkring (The Annual Circle) (1945)
- Antilla in Brand: Curaçao's geschiedenis 1939-1945 (Antilla on Fire: Curaçao's History 1939–1945) (1946)
- Oud Rechtsgebruik op Curaçao Herleefd; Een Voortvluchtige Militair Ingedaagd (Old Legal Customs Revived in Curaçao; A Fugitive Soldier Charged) (1946)
- De Pers van Curaçao in Wereldoorlog II (The Press of Curaçao in World War II) (1946)
- De voorgenomen uitbreiding van Willemstad op Curaçao, Oranjestad en Sint Nicolaas op Aruba (The planned expansion of Willemstad on Curaçao, Oranjestad, and Sint Nicolaas on Aruba) (1947)
- Oud Nummer van de "St. Eustatius Gazette" (Old Issue of the "St. Eustatius Gazette") (1948)
- Cultural Life in Curacao (1949)
- Aruba' s oudste kerk 1750-1816-1952 (Aruba's oldest church 1750-1816-1952) (1951)
- De Heilige Berg (The Holy Mountain)
- Publiciteit op Aruba (Publicity in Aruba) (1957)
- Bonaire: Van Indianen tot Toeristen (Bonaire: From Indians to Tourists) (1957)
- Aruba: Past and Present: From the Time of the Indians until Today (1961)
- Curaçao: Van Kolonie tot Autonomie : Deel I (tot 1816) (Curaçao: From Colony to Autonomy: Part I (till 1816)) (1961)
- Bonaire: Short History (1962)
- Het verhaal der Maduro's en foto-album van Curaçao 1837–1962 (The Story of the Maduro Family and Photo Album of Curaçao, 1837–1962) (1962)
- De Bovenwindse Eilanden: Sint Maarten, Saba, Sint Eustatius : Eens Gouden Rots, Nu Zilveren Dollars (The Windward Islands: Sint Maarten, Saba, Sint Eustatius: Once Golden Rock, Now Silver Dollars) (1964)
- St. Maarten, Saba, St. Eustatius (1966)
- Waar de bomen altijd groen zijn en de bladeren altijd vallen: Dolend langs Curaçao's en Aruba's slingerpaadjes (Where the trees are always green and the leaves always fall: Wandering along Curaçao's and Aruba's winding paths) (1966)
- Curaçao: zijn geschiedenis in het kort (Curaçao: a short history) (1967)
- Manuel Carel Piar: De jongen van Otrobanda (Manuel Carel Piar: The boy from Otrobanda) (1967)
- Retratos de Piedra / Stenen Portretten / Stone Portraits (1967)
- Curaçao: From Colonial Dependence tot Autonomy (1968)
- Zes eilanden een natie (Six islands one nation) (1970)
- This is Aruba (1971)
- U.S. consul in the 19th century Curacao: the life and works of Leonard Burlington Smith (1971)
- Curaçao: Short History (1973)
- Tula: verlangen naar vrijheid (Tula: desire for freedom) (1973)
- A Short History of Bonaire (1975)
- History of St. Eustatius (1976)
- The Jews and St. Eustatius: the eighteenth century Jewish Congregation Honen Dalim and description of the old Cemetery (1976)
- Bibliotheken en leesgewoonten (Libraries and reading habits) (1977)
- Curaçao in oude ansichten (Curaçao in old postcards) (1979)
- Retable of Noord Chapel of Alto Vista (1979)
- Aruba: zoals het was, zoals het werd: van de tijd der Indianen tot op heden (Aruba: Past and Present: From the Time of the Indians until Today) (1980)
- History of Sint Maarten and Saint Martin (1981)
- Biografia del Almirante Luis Brion (Biography of Admiral Luis Brion) (1983)
- De Nederlandse Antillen en de Verenigde Staten van Amerika (The Netherlands Antilles and the United States of America) (1983)
- The Old Fort of Aruba (1985)
- Juwana Morto: Kustbatterij Aruba (Juwana Morto: Coastal battery Aruba) (1987)
- De banden tussen Oranje, de Nederlandse Antillen en Aruba (The ties between Orange, de Dutch Antilles and Aruba) (1988)
- Het gedrukte woord in de Nederlandse Antillen en Aruba (The printed word in the Netherlands Antilles and Aruba) (1992)
- De Geschiedenis van Twee Landen. De Nederlandse Antillen en Aruba (The History of Two Countries. The Dutch Antilles and Aruba) (1993)
- The forts of Sint Maarten and Saint Martin the historical defences of a binational island (1994)
- Het Oude Fort van Aruba: de geschiedenis van het Fort Zoutman en de Toren Willem III (The Old Fort of Aruba: the history of Fort Zoutman and the Tower Willem III) (1995)
- Het oude fort op de berg: gedenkboek bij het tweehonderdjarig bestaan van Fort Nassau op Curaçao (The old fort on the mountain: commemorative book on the bicentenary of Fort Nassau on Curaçao) (1996)
- Aruba in oude ansichten (Aruba in old postcards) (1996)

== Sources ==
- Rutgers, Wim (1997). "Sprekend doctor Hartog" [Speaking Doctor Hartog]. Arubaans Akkoord: Opstellen over Aruba van voor de komst van de olieindustrie [Aruban Agreement: Writings about Aruba from before the arrival of the oil industry] (in Dutch). Bloemendaal: Stichting Libri Antilliani. pp. 13–25.
