= Amigoe =

Periodical from the Dutch Antillies

- Type: Daily newspaper
- Owner(s): Catholic Church
- Founded: December 1883
- Language: Dutch
- Website: www.amigoe.com

The Amigoe is a Dutch-language daily newspaper with editorials in Curaçao and distributed in the Dutch Caribbean, specifically Curaçao and Aruba. The newspaper is one of the most widely read dailies in Aruba.

== History ==
The newspaper, initially named Amigoe di Curaçao, was founded in December 1883 by the Dominican Order. It began circulating in Aruba in 1884. From 1884 until 1935, Amigoe operated as a weekly mission magazine. However, just before the Second World War, there was a decision to transform it into a daily newspaper. Johan Hartog accepted the editorship, and under his leadership, Amigoe transitioned into a daily newspaper. In 1941, the newspaper became a daily publication, excluding Sundays under the auspices of the Catholic church. The online version of the newspaper was founded on January 8, 1998.

== See also ==
- Antilliaans Dagblad
