= Tang Xiaodan =

Chinese film director (1910–2012)

- Born: 22 February 1910; Hua'an, Fujian, Qing dynasty
- Died: 21 January 2012 (aged 101); Shanghai, China
- Occupation: Film director
- Years active: 1930s–1980s
- Children: Tang Muli; Tang Muhai

Tang Xiaodan (Chinese: 汤晓丹; 22 February 1910 – 21 January 2012) was a Chinese film director. In 1984, he won the Golden Rooster Award for Best Director. He was the father of painter Tang Muli and conductor Tang Muhai.

== Filmography ==
This is a partial list of films.

- 1933 A Movie Actress - Director
- 1933 Bai Jinlong (白金龙) - Director
- 1933 Drifting (飘零) - Director
- 1936 The Perfect Match - Director
- 1938 Shanghai under Fire (上海火线后) - Director
- 1940 Little Guangdong - Director
- 1941 Roar of the People (民族的吼声) - Director
- Dream in Paradise (天堂春梦; 1947)
- Reunion After Victory (胜利重逢; 1951)
- Victory After Victory (南征北战; 1952)
- Reconnaissance Across the Yangtze (渡江侦察记; 1954)
- City Without Nights (不夜城; 1957)
- Aolei Yilan (傲蕾·一兰; 1979)
- Nanchang Uprising (南昌起义; 1981)
- Liao Zhongkai (廖仲恺; 1983)
