= Muhai Tang =

Chinese conductor (born 1949)

Muhai Tang (simplified Chinese: 汤沐海; traditional Chinese: 湯沐海; pinyin: Tāng Mùhǎi; born 1949 in Shanghai) is a Chinese conductor. He is the youngest son of Chinese film director Tang Xiaodan and brother of painter and poet Tang Muli.

Tang initially learned music with his parents, and later studied composition and conducting at the Shanghai Conservatory of Music, receiving his diploma in both. He furthered his studies in conducting with Hermann Michael at the Hochschule für Musik in Munich, Germany.

His international career started when Herbert von Karajan invited him to conduct the Berlin Philharmonic Orchestra during the 1983–1984 season. He was the chief conductor of the Gulbenkian Orchestra in Lisbon from 1988 until 2001. From 1991 to 1995, he was chief conductor of DePhilharmonie (now known as the Antwerp Symphony Orchestra). He made his US debut with the San Francisco Symphony in 1988.

In 1991 Tang was chief conductor of the Queensland Symphony Orchestra (QSO), the last chief conductor prior to the orchestra's renaming as the Queensland Orchestra. In November 2005, he became the orchestra's conductor laureate.

From 2003 to 2006, Tang served as Chief Conductor of the Finnish National Opera. From 2006 to 2011, Tang was artistic director and principal conductor of the Zürcher Kammerorchester (Zurich Chamber Orchestra), and became principal guest conductor in 2011. From 2010 until 2015, he was chief conductor of the Belgrade Philharmonic Orchestra.

As conductor, he was awarded the 2002 Grammy Award for Best Classical Contemporary Composition for Christopher Rouse's Concert de Gaudí.

Cultural offices
Preceded by Claudio Scimone	Principal Conductor, Gulbenkian Orchestra; 1988–2001	Succeeded by Lawrence Foster
Preceded by Günter Neuhold	Chief Conductor, DeFilharmonie; 1991–1995	Succeeded by Grant Llewellyn
Preceded by Okko Kamu	Chief Conductor, Finnish National Opera; 2003-2006	Succeeded by Mikko Franck
Preceded by Howard Griffiths	Artistic Director, Zurich Chamber Orchestra; 2006–2011	Succeeded by Roger Norrington
Preceded by Dorian Wilson	Chief Conductor, Belgrade Philharmonic Orchestra; 2010–2015	Succeeded by Gabriel Feltz
