= Tang Muli =

Tang Muli (Chinese: 汤沐黎; pinyin: Tāng Mùlǐ; born 1947 in Shanghai) is a Chinese painter and poet based in Montreal, Quebec, Canada. He is the eldest son of celebrated Chinese film director Tang Xiaodan and brother of conductor Tang Muhai.

Tang started painting at the age of six, and received his first international art award at age twelve. During the Cultural Revolution, Tang was assigned to work in a dairy-farm commune outside Shanghai and then as a designer for the Shanghai Agricultural Exhibition.

Tang completed a Master of Arts degree at the Central Academy of Fine Arts in Beijing in 1980. He won the Chinese government scholarship for advanced study abroad through its first nationwide competition. He then received a British Council Fellowship to attend the Royal College of Art in London. Subsequently, Tang was selected by the prestigious Peter Moores Foundation in 1983 as one of the fifteen most outstanding artists working in Britain, alongside Lucian Freud. In 1984 he obtained a second M.A. degree from the Royal College of Art.

From 1985 until 1989, Tang was artist-in-residence at Cornell University in the United States.

== Major works ==
In 1972 Tang was commissioned by the Shanghai health service to paint a work about acupuncture's usefulness as an anesthetic in surgery. Art officials were dissatisfied with the painting submitted by a health worker the preceding year, and waived guidelines to allow Tang to paint in the evenings, after he completed his daily farm work. The spareness of Maoist slogans in the result, Acupuncture Anesthesia (针刺麻醉), was considered very daring by the art world of the time. Acupuncture Anesthesia is currently part of the collection of the National Gallery of China and was exhibited at the Solomon R. Guggenheim Museum in New York City and at the Guggenheim Museum Bilbao in 1998 as part of the China: 5,000 Years exhibition.

In 1976 Tang began work on On the March (转战南北), commissioned by the Shanghai municipal government to mark the first anniversary of Mao Zedong's death. He completed the painting in 1977. The work was exhibited at the New York Asia Society Museum in 2008 as part of its Art and China's Revolution exhibition.

King Chu Bidding Farewell to His Concubine (霸王别姬) constituted Tang's graduation piece from the Central Academy of Fine Art and remains in the academy's collection. It was exhibited at the National Gallery of China in 2005. The painting graces the cover of a 1997 edition of the Records of the Grand Historian by Sima Qian.

In 2001 Tang was selected by the Parliament of Canada to paint the official portrait of the Honorable Sir John Joseph Caldwell Abbott. The painting was unveiled at a formal ceremony on Parliament Hill on June 3, 2002.

In 2003 Tang published his first volume of poetry, Selected Poetry and Paintings by Muli Tang.

== Style ==
Tang won accolades for the graceful, sensitive realism of his works. He has been particularly productive in portraiture; among his subjects are Canadian prime ministers and recipients of the Order of Canada.
