= Edmond de Stoutz =

Swiss conductor

Edmond de Stoutz (18 December 1920 – 28 January 1997) was a Swiss conductor from Zurich.

He was the founder of the Zürcher Kammerorchester (Zurich Chamber Orchestra) in 1945 and conducted the ensemble until 1996. As conductor he performed all across the world, including New York's prestigious Carnegie Hall.

== Selected recordings ==
- Johann Sebastian Bach: Concerto No. 1 in C minor for two pianos, BWV 1060
- Joseph Haydn: Concerto No.11, Concerto No. 4 in G major, Arturo Benedetti Michelangeli, EMI 1975
- Wolfgang Amadeus Mozart: Violin Concerto No. 2 in D major, K. 211
- Peter Mieg: Concerto for oboe and strings, Igor Stravinsky: Concerto in D for string orchestra, Concerto in E-flat (Dumbarton Oaks) for 15 instruments
- Mozart: Bassoon Concerto, K. 191; Clarinet Concerto, K. 622
- 20th century masterpieces of the Vienna school
- Giuseppe Tartini: Concerto in G major (D 75), Concerto in A major (D 95), Concerto in D major (D 30)
- Othmar Schoeck: Concerto (quasi una fantasia) in B flat major, op. 21, for violin and orchestra; Concerto, op. 65, for horn and string orchestra
