= Zurich Chamber Orchestra =

Swiss chamber orchestra based in Zurich

- Orchestra
- Founded: 1945; 80 years ago
- Location: Zurich, Switzerland
- Concert hall: Tonhalle
- Principal conductor: Daniel Hope
- Website: Official website

The Zurich Chamber Orchestra (Zürcher Kammerorchester; ZKO, German abbreviation) is a Swiss chamber orchestra based in Zurich. The ZKO's principal concert venue in Zurich is the Tonhalle. The ZKO also performs in Zurich at the Schauspielhaus Zürich, the ZKO-Haus in the Seefeld quarter of the city, and such churches as the Fraumünster and the Kirche St. Peter.

The ZKO presents approximately 40 performances in Zurich each year, in addition to approximately 40 children's concerts and performances elsewhere in Switzerland and abroad. In the 2016–2017, season the total number of concerts was 151, a record for the ZKO.

The core of the ZKO consists of 28 permanent members (string players, flute, oboe, horn, harpsichord), with other sections (woodwinds, strings, brass, harp and percussion) used as needed.

== History ==
Edmond de Stoutz founded the ZKO in the aftermath of World War II, and led its first concerts in 1945. He served as artistic leader and principal conductor of the ZKO until 1996. He commissioned many works, including Peter Mieg's Concerto for oboe and orchestra (1957) and Frank Martin's Polyptyque for violin and two small string orchestras (1973).

In 1996, Howard Griffiths assumed the post of artistic director and served until 2006. Muhai Tang was the ZKO's third principal conductor and artistic director, from 2006 through 2011. Sir Roger Norrington was its fourth principal conductor, starting with the 2011–2012 season. He concluded his ZKO tenure after the 2015–2016 season and now has the title of honorary conductor with the ZKO. Daniel Hope became its music director in the 2016–2017 season. The ZKO enjoys a particular collaboration in baroque music with Maurice Steger.

In the US, the ZKO first appeared in New York City in 1955. It was the first Swiss orchestra ever to go on a tour through the USA. The ZKO made its Boston debut in 1967 for the Peabody Mason Concert series. Since then the ZKO visited the US several times, latest in November 2019.

The ZKO has made commercial recordings for such labels as Omega, Novalis, Claves, Teldec, CPO, and Sony. In 2017 two of the orchestra's CD-releases were honoured with an Echo Classic Award in the Classics Without Borders category: For Seasons with Daniel Hope as soloist and ÜberBach with Sebastian Knauer on the piano.

== Artistic directors and principal conductors ==
- Edmond de Stoutz (1945–1996)
- Howard Griffiths (1996–2006)
- Muhai Tang (2006–2011)
- Sir Roger Norrington (2011–2016)
- Daniel Hope (2016–present)

== Discography (newer publications) ==
- Zwingli – Original Motion Picture Soundtrack. Works by Diego Baldenweg with Nora Baldenweg and Lionel Baldenweg. Soloist: Daniel Hope (Violin). GREAT GARBO music, 2019.
- Journey to Mozart. Works by Mozart and his contemporaries. Soloist: Daniel Hope (violin). Deutsche Grammophon, 2018.
- Bach & Sons 2. Works by J. S. Bach, C. P. E. Bach, and J. Chr. Bach. Soloist: Sebastian Knauer (piano). Berlin Classics, 2017.
- Four Seasons. Works by Vivaldi, Bach, Frahm, Gonzales i. a. Soloist: Daniel Hope (violin). Deutsche Grammophon, 2017. (Honoured with an Echo Classic Award 2017)
- ÜberBach. Works by Arash Safaian. Soloists: Sebastian Knauer (Klavier), Pascal Schumacher. Neue Meister, 2016. (Honoured with an Echo Classic Award 2017)
- Haydn: Paris Symphonies. Conductor: Sir Roger Norrington. Sony Classical, 2015.
- Ave Maria / Rejoice / Hallelujah. Works by Handel, Mozart, Bach i. a. Soloists: Jonah Schenkel, Conductor: Alphons von Aarburg, Choir: Zürcher Sängerknaben. Tudor, 2015.
- Johann Sebastian Bach: Klavierkonzerte BWV 1052–1058. Soloist: Yorck Kronenberg. Genuin classics, 2014.
- Mozart: Serenade No. 5, K. 204/213a, Divertimento No. 10, K. 247 «Lodronische Nachtmusik». Conductor: Sir Roger Norrington. Sony Classical, 2014.
- Vienna 1789. Works by Mozart, Haydn and Beethoven. Soloist: Sebastian Knauer (piano), Conductor: Sir Roger Norrington. Berlin Classics, 2013.
- Serenade: Songs for Clarinet. Works by Brahms, Grieg, Mozart, Schubert und Schumann. Soloist: Fabio Di Càsola. Sony Classical, 2013.
- Stravinsky: Histoire du Soldat, Dumbarton Oaks: Danses concertantes. Conductor: Sir Roger Norrington. Sony Classical, 2013.
- Bach & Sons. Works by J. S. Bach, C. P. E. Bach, and J. Chr. Bach. Soloist: Sebastian Knauer (piano), Conductor: Sir Roger Norrington. Berlin Classics, 2011.
- Antonio Rosetti: Oboe Concertos / Symphonies. Soloist: Kurt Meier, Conductor: Johannes Moesus. cpo/DRS, 2011.
- Shostakovich & Lewensohn: Sonata For Viola / ViolAlive. Soloist: Gilad Karni, Conductor: Ariel Zuckermann. Sony Classical, 2011.
- Die wilden Schwäne: Ein Märchen frei nach Hans Christian Andersen. Storyteller: Sandra Studer, Conductor: Jochen Rieder. 2011.
