= Peter Mieg =

Swiss composer, painter, and journalist

- Born: 5 September 1906; Lenzburg
- Died: 7 December 1990 (aged 84); Aarau

Peter Mieg (5 September 1906 – 7 December 1990) was a Swiss composer, painter and journalist.

== Biography ==
Mieg was born in Lenzburg where he spent almost all his life. He studied art history, archaeology, music history as well as French and German Literature in Zurich, Basel and Paris from 1927 to 1933. In the early 1930s Mieg became a journalist writing articles about art, music and literature for newspapers such as the Basler Nachrichten, the Weltwoche and the Badener Tagblatt.

Between 1933 and 1939 he became friends with the conductor and patron Paul Sacher and the composers Béla Bartók, Igor Stravinsky, Arthur Honegger and Bohuslav Martinu.

== Compositions ==
In the 1940s Mieg completed his musical formation with Frank Martin. His first important works were written in the 1950s in a very personal neoclassicism. From that time on he was commissioned by the Tonhalle Orchester Zürich (Symphony, 1958), the Zurich Chamber Orchestra (Concerto per clavicembalo e orchestra da camera, 1953, Concerto Veneziano, 1955, the Concerto for oboe and orchestra, 1957, the Concerto pour piano à quatre mains et orchestre à cordes, 1980), the Lausanne Chamber Orchestra (Piano Concerto No. 2, 1962), the Lucerne Festival Strings (Toccata – Arioso – Gigue, 1959, and Triple concerto dans le goût italien, 1978), and many others.

Mieg wrote some 135 compositions, including several concertos (for piano, for violin, for flute, for 2 flutes, for harp, for cello, for piano and cello), a lot of chamber music and piano music (5 piano sonatas).

== Painting ==
In 1961 Mieg exhibited his gouaches for the first time. They mostly represent still life and landscapes. He had been painting since his childhood.

== Family ==
Peter Mieg's grandaunt was Swiss composer and singer Fanny Hünerwadel (1826–1854).

== Bibliography ==
- Anna Kardos, Tom Hellat: Auf der Suche nach dem eigenen Klang – Der Komponist, Publizist und Maler Peter Mieg, Hier und Jetzt, Baden 2016, ISBN 978-303919-378-3
- Silvia Kind: Peter Mieg, in: Monologue. Washington DC, 2001, p. 226–235.
- Michael Schneider: Der Komponist Peter Mieg: Leben – Werk – Rezeption (The composer Peter Mieg: Life - Work - Reception). Amadeus, Winterthur 1995, ISBN 3-905049-64-3.
- Brigitte Morach-Müller (editor): Peter Mieg als Maler (Peter Mieg as a painter). With articles by Emil Maurer, Peter Mieg, Jean Rudolf von Salis and Edmond de Stoutz. Kromer, Lenzburg, 1984.
- Reni Mertens & Walter Marti: Der Komponist, Maler, Schriftsteller und Journalist Peter Mieg (The composer, painter and journalist Peter Mieg). Film about Peter Mieg, 1980
- Uli Däster, Walter Kläy and Walter Labhart (editors): Peter Mieg. Eine Monographie (Peter Mieg. A Monography). Sauerländer, Aarau and Frankfurt 1976, ISBN 3-7941-1529-5.
