= National Library of Aruba =

Coordinates: 12.5151°N 70.0295°W

- Biblioteca National Aruba
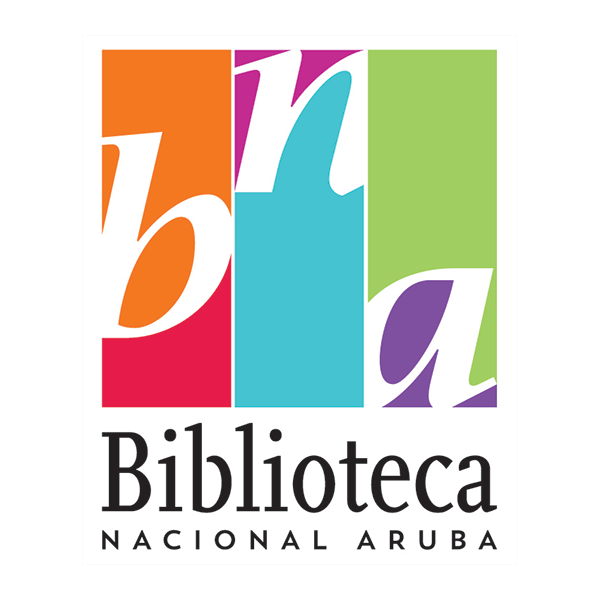

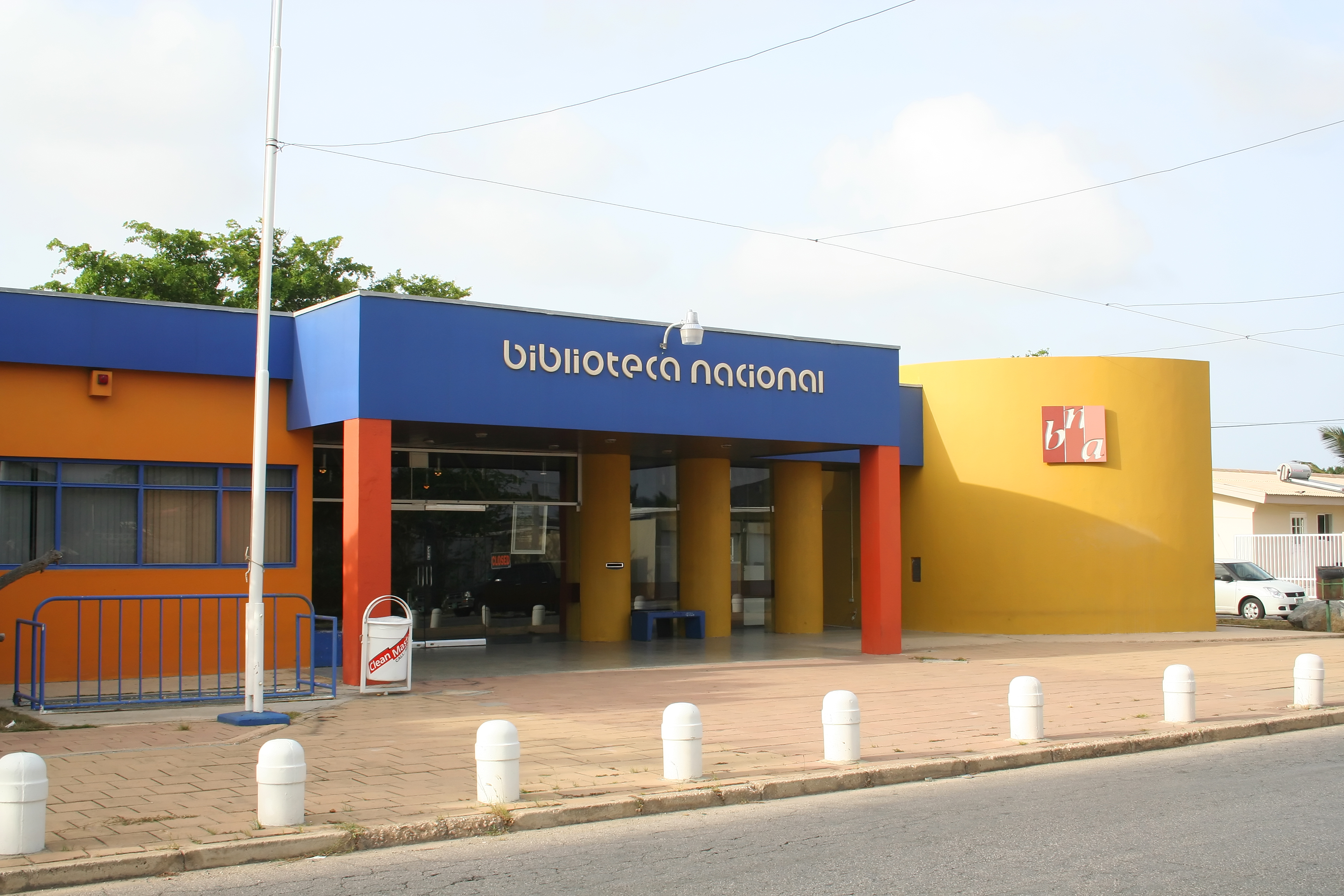
- Aruba National Library
- Location: Oranjestad, Aruba
- Type: National Library
- Established: 1949
- Branches: 2

Collection
- Size: 100,000 items

Access and use
- Population served: 110,000

Other information
- Director: Astrid Britten
- Employees: 70
- Website: www.bibliotecanacional.aw

The National Library of Aruba (Papiamento: Biblioteca Nacional Aruba, BNA) is the main library of Aruba. It is located in Oranjestad and holds more than 100,000 volumes.

BNA serves as both the national and the public library of Aruba. It was founded on 20 August 1949 as the island's public library and reading room. After Aruba gained its status aparte in 1986 the Aruba Public Library (Papiamento: Biblioteca Publico Aruba) officially became the National Library of Aruba.

BNA has a public library branch in San Nicolas, and a separate building, Arubiana-Caribiana, housing the National and special collections, located in Oranjestad, near the main branch.

The BNA holds an annual "Green Education Symposium" to make students and educators of Aruba aware of their local environment so that they become active advocates of the environment surrounding them to make Aruba sustainable for future generations. This is in line with the Sustainable Development Goals of the United Nations.

== See also ==
- *Wikimedia Commons: Media contributed by Biblioteca Nacional Aruba
- List of national libraries
- National Archives of Aruba
