= List of compositions for accordion and string quartet =

List of compositions for accordion and string quartet. Composers started writing music for this special combination in the second half of the twentieth century.

== A ==
- Alain Abbott (1938)
  - Simples Melodies...: 4 pièces très faciles pour accordéon de concert et quatuor à cordes (1979)
- Hans Abrahamsen (1952)
  - Three Little Nocturnes (2005)
- Sergey Akhunov (1967)
  - Two Keys to one Brodsky's poem
- Franck Angelis
  - Étude sur le thème Chiquilín de Bachín
- Valéry Arzoumanov (1944)
  - Quintette (2013)
- Dirk d'Ase (1960)
  - Burning Day (1995)

== B ==
- Zbigniew Bargielski (1937)
  - Noc pożegnań na akordeon i kwartet smyczkowy (1983) "Abschiedsnacht"

(Revised version premiered on March 13, 1996, by Georg Schulz (Wiener Konzerthaus, Vienna, AT))

- Vidmantas Bartulis (1954)
  - We sing reservedly in the presence of the unknown... (2008)
- Jürg Baur (1918-2010)
  - Concerto für Mixtur-Trautonium und Streichquartett, Fassung für Akkordeon(1956/1987)
- Franck Bedrossian (1971)
  - I lost a world the other day (2016)
- Robert Russell Bennett (1894/1981)
  - Quintet (Psychiatry) for accordion and string quartet (1963)
- Bernard van Beurden (1933-2016)
  - A-vier (2009)
- Joseph Biviano
  - Quintet in G
- Marcin Błażewicz (1953)
  - Can you hear them? - Shadows of Memory for accordion and string quartet (2001)
- Jack Body (1944-2015)
  - Saetas (2003/05)
- Edward Bogusławski (1940-2003)
  - Impromptu II A for string quartet and accordion (1999)
- Marcin Bortnowski (1972)
  - Music in lent (2000)
- Mikhail Bronner (1952)
  - 1812 Capriccio for bayan and string quartet (2012)
  - Seven Yiddish Songs for bayan and string quartet (version) (2014)
- Walter Buczynski (1933)
  - Projection for accordion and string quartet (1978)

== C ==
- Cesare Chiacchiaretta (1973)
  - Anemos (2017)
- Mary Ellen Childs (1957)
  - Four of One of Another (1988)
- Wiesław Cienciała (1961 )
  - Variants n° 2 [version II] for accordion and string quartet (1996)
- Vladislav Cojocaru (1983)
  - Harlequin (2016)
  - Torero
- David Croft (1922-2011) and Roy Moore
  - The 'Allo 'Allo! theme (1982)

== D ==
- Fridolin Dallinger (1933)
  - Quintet for accordion and string quartet (2009)
- Gary Daverne (1939)
  - Concert Waltz (1993)
- Đeni Dekleva-Radaković (1949 )
  - Kvintet
- Robert Denhof (1945)
  - Concertino für Bajan/Akkordeon und Streichquartett oder Streichorchester op. 139 (2012)
- Henryk Derus (1959)
  - Euphõnia (1996)
- Jean-Louis Dhaine (1949 - 2006)
  - Night music
- David Diamond (1915 - 2005)
  - Night music (1961)
- Snieguolė Dikčiūtė (1966)
  - Arcade (2008)
- Violeta Dinescu (1953)
  - All´ombra del tiempo (1995)
- Miro Dobrowolny (1959)
  - Pavane (2009)
- Doderer, Johanna (1969)
  - Heidekrautwalzer für Akkordeon und Streichquartett

== E ==
- Simon Eastwood (1985)
  - Magnetic Lines (2015)

== F ==
- Markus Fagerudd (1961)
  - Wilma sarja (2007)
- Ivan Fedele (1953)
  - Deystviya (2011)
- Günter Friedrichs (1935)
  - Storie e colori (1988/89)

== G ==
- Pascal Gaigne (1958)
  - Avant la nuit (2003)
- Vytautas Germanavičius (1969)
  - Black Shadows - White Shadows (2008)
- Aaron Gervais (1980)
  - Four Pieces for Accordion and String Quartet (2003)
- Jani Golob (1948)
  - Concertino for accordion & string quartet (2012)
- Gerardo Gozzi (1988)
  - Spazi della memoria di un vecchio (2015)
- Herbert Grassl (1948)
  - Cinque incontri (1995)
- Eric Gross (1926-2011)
  - Concert fantasia, op. 252 (2001)

== H ==
- Pouya Hamidi (1986)
  - Three Reflections on Empathy (2015)
- Gorka Hermosa
  - Gernika, 26/4/1937 (1994)
  - Anantango (2003/15)
- Bertold Hummel (1925-2002)
  - Tripartita opus 85a (1986)
- Veikko Huuskonen (1930)
  - Kesäsarja (version 1) (2000)
- Asko Hyvärinen (1963)
  - Ehiknosdeux (2000)

== J ==
- David Johnstone
  - Sonata de Cámara" (Mar del plata), for Accordion and String Quartet (2003)
- Ralf Jung
  - As-Musik

== K ==
- Ben Kahmann (1914-2002)
  - Rhapsodium
- Shigeru Kan-no (1959)
  - Pro-Concerto-Grosso WVE 168-b for Accordion and String Quartet(2000)
- Friedrich Keil (1957)
  - Drei Referenzen (2004)
- Johannes Kern (1965)
  - Happy birthday to me (1996)
- Hannes Kerschbaumer (1981)
  - abbozzo V for quartertone-accordion and string quartet (2014)
- Jouni Kesti (1946)
  - Jounikvintetto (2011)
- Nikola Kołodziejczyk (1986)
  - Subliminal Folk Suite
- Jo Kondo (1947)
  - Yarrow (2005)
- Włodzimierz Korcz (1943)
  - 07 zgłoś się (2013)
- Przemysław Książek (1976)
  - Concerto breve n° 2 for accordion and string quartet
  - Obsessio
- Veli Kujala (1976)
  - Friixi (2006)
  - Mixi for quartertone-accordion and string quartet (2011)
- Ladislav Kupkovič (1936-2016)
  - Quintet for Accordion and String Quartet (2005)

== L ==
- Hope Lee (1953)
  - Fei Yang (2000)
- Krzysztof Lenczowski
  - Atom Accordion Quintet
- Martin Lichtfuss (1959)
  - K*tzbühel - eine Patriotische Huldigung (2008)
- Martin Lohse (1971)
  - Concerto in tempi (2012)
- Grégoire Lorieux (1976)
  - Description du blanc (b) (2011)
- I-Tsen Lu
  - Jenseits, im ungewissen (1996)
- Ray Luedeke (1944)
  - Tango Dreams, for accordion and string trio
- Torbjörn Lundquist
  - Bewegungen (1966)

== M ==
- Andrew Paul MacDonald (1958)
  - Winds of Thera op. 44 (1997)
- Teisutis Makačinas (1938)
  - Arcade (2008)
- Mikołaj Majkusiak (1983)
  - up2U
- Javier Torres Maldonado
  - Luz (2000)
- Miklós Maros (1943)
  - Quintetto mantice for Accordion and String Quartet (2012)
- David Mastikosa (1992)
  - Dimensio for accordion and string quartet (2017)
- Dominic Matthews
  - Dvasia (2018)
- Chiel Meijering (1954)
  - Spinning out (1989)
- Michał Moc (1977)
  - Accordella (2000)
- Eric Morin (1969)
  - In Praise of Folly (2010)
- Staffan Mossenmark (1961)
  - Kraftspiel (1991)
- Aures Kabir Moussong
  - Sama (2013)
- Marian Mozetich (1948)
  - Hymn of ascension, original version for harmonium and string quartet
- Massimo Munari (1976)
  - Esar II (2016)
- Benjamin de Murashkin (1981)
  - Microcosm (2016)
- Matti Murto (1947)
  - Kvintetto (2007)
- Peter Mutter (1992)
  - Impuls (2015)

== N ==
- Aspasia Nasopoulou (1972)
  - Perivoli (2013)
- Daniel Nelson (1965)
  - My inner disco (2002)
- Jon Øivind Ness (1968)
  - Spoof Spiral 2 : for accordion and string quartet (2001)
- James Nightingale (accordionist) (1948)
  - Cantillations
- Patrick Nunn (1969)
  - Escape-velocity (2006)

== O ==
- Krzysztof Olczak (1956)
  - Angels of Darkness (version 2) (2002)
- Jan Oleszkowicz (1947)
  - Tzigane koncert (2000)
- Sławomir Olszamowski (1953)
  - Quintet 144 MM. for accordion and string quartet (1999)
- Esa Onttonen (1975)
  - Kiduspoika Janus (2002)

== P ==
- Jaime Padrós (1926-2007)
  - Epigrafos sonorizados (1986)
- Klaus Paier (1966)
  - invencíon 1998 for accordion & string quartet (1998)
  - scenes (2006)
  - tres sentimientos (2006)
  - three + four (2006)
- Theodor Pauß (1969)
  - Noch einmal, in alle Ewigkeit! (2000)
- Barbara Pentland (1912-2000)
  - Interplay (1972)
- Carlos Peron-Cano (1976)
  - Natura Celestis (version 2)
- Matthias Pintscher (1971)
  - Figura I (1998)
- Astor Piazzolla
  - Five Tango Sensations for bandoneón & string quartet (1989)
- Efrem Podgaits (1949)
  - Ex animo (2003)
- Kimmo Pohjonen (1964)
  - Uniko (2004), CD Project with Kronos Quartet (2011)
- Gene Pritsker (1971)
  - Revisited Residue (2017)
- Donatas Prusevičius (1966)
  - Storm (2004)
- Bronisław Kazimierz Przybylski (1941-2011)
  - Metamorphosen für Akkordeon und Streichquartett (1985)
  - From the Life triptych for accordion and string quartet (2000)
  - Night Birds (version 3) for accordion and string quartet (2007)
- Kazimierz Pyzik (1955)
  - Halucynacja n° 4 (1999)

== R ==
- Osmo Tapio Räihälä (1964)
  - De-cadenza (2005)
- Maja Solveig Kjelstrup Ratkje (1973)
  - Gagaku variations (2001)
- Werner Richter (1929-2008)
  - Musik über ein böhmisches Volkslied (1980)
- Wolfgang Rihm (1952)
  - Fetzen 3, 5, 6, 7, 8 (2002)
- Aldemaro Romero (1928-2007)
  - Five Paleontological Mysteries: I. Fossils; II. Lizards; III. Jelly Fishes; IV. Paleocyphonates; V. Ubos (2005)
- Richard Romiti (1943)
  - Serenade (1979)
- Nick Roth (1982)
  - Second Quintet (2019)
- Bernhard Rövenstrunck (1920)
  - Adaptationen (1969)
- Poul Ruders (1949)
  - Serenade on the shores of the Cosmic Ocean (2005)

== S ==
- Jorge Torres Sáenz (1968)
  - Primera intempestiva (2018)
- Jacek Sajka (1961)
  - Noumenon (1999)
- Jan Sandström (1954)
  - Strange Matter (1985)
- Gerwin Schmucker
  - Orbit
- Patrice Sciortino (1922)
  - Improvvisatura (2013)
- Gabriel Sivak (1979)
  - Nadando en la nada (2008)
- Ylva Skog (1963)
  - Trote (2018-2019)
- Bent Sørensen (1958)
  - Dancers and Disappearance (2018)
- Martin Stauning (1982)
  - Where We Are There Is No Here (2014)
- Robert Stiegler (1959)
  - Parlando, a fantasy with four in one
- Nicolaas van Straten
  - Curven (1970)
- Józef Świder (1930)
  - Suite im alten Stil (1979)

== T ==
- Rob Teehan
  - Wistful thinking (2010)
- Sara Torquati (1961)
  - Puer Natus (2003)
- Javier Torres-Maldonado (1968)
  - Lux (2001)
- Pavel Trojan (1956)
  - Ballet scenes (2011)
- Jan Truhlář (1928 - 2007)
  - Scherzo (version 1) (1968)
  - Sentence (2002)

== U ==
- Raimonds Ungurs
  - Malda (Prayer) (2015)

== V ==
- Gunnar Valkare (1943)
  - Taang (2001)
  - EX (2002)
- Anna Veismane (1979)
  - Why me? (version 2) (2010)
- Francesca Verunelli (1979)
  - Luminal (2007)

== W ==
- Adrian Williams (1956)
  - Quintet (1996)
- James Wilson (1922–2005)
  - Quintet for Accordion and Strings Op. 22 (1967)
- Helena Winkelman (1974)
  - Tides-Sedit (2010)
- Tomas Winter (1954)
  - Gömställen (2002/03)
- Piotr Wróbel
  - Suita 3 5 7
- Gerhard Wuensch (1925-2007)
  - Music without Pretensions, Opus 45 (1969)
- Zdzislaw Wysocki (1944)
  - Quintettino - für Akkordeon und Streichquartett (1994)

== Y ==
- Aliaksandr Yasinski
  - Peace (Мір) (2015)
- Video on YouTube
- Isang Yun (1917-1995)
  - Concertino (1983)
- Video on YouTube

== Z ==
- Franck Zabel (1968)
  - Danse disparue (2012)
- Video on YouTube

== Sources ==
- Aut|C. Jacomucci (ed.): Critical selection of accordion works composed between 1990 and 2010. Loreto: Edizioni Tecnostampa, 2014. ISBN 978-88-87651-54-6.
- RIM Repertoire lists volume 8 accordion, Utrecht 1990 (Repertoire Informatie Centrum)
