= Nick Roth (composer) =

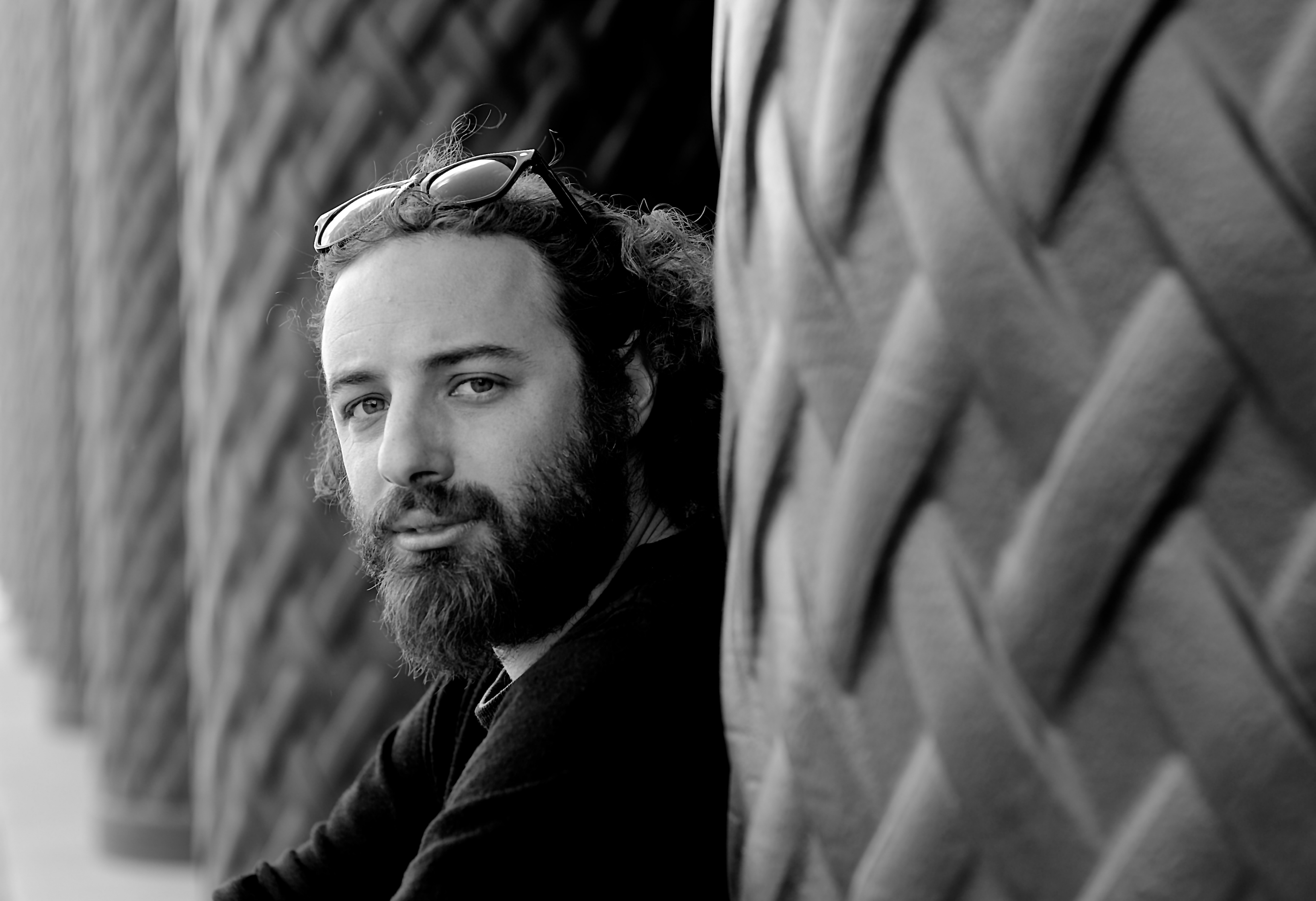
- Born: 27 April 1982 (age 44); London, England
- Occupations: saxophonist, composer
- Website: www.nickrothmusic.com

Nick Roth (born 27 April 1982) is a British / Irish saxophonist, composer, producer and educator.

== Work ==
Roth's work explores the liberation of improvisation from composition, the poetic syntax of philosophical enquiry, and the function of music as translative epistemology (MaTE).

He has developed projects in collaboration with scientists Thomas E. Lovejoy, Margaret D. Lowman, Iain Couzin and Henry S. Horn and his work has been commissioned and performed by the European Saxophone Ensemble, T. S. Eliot Foundation, RTÉ ConTempo Quartet, Happy Days International Beckett Festival, Trio InVento, The Ark Cultural Centre for Children, Dublin Dance Festival, Hong Kong New Music Ensemble, Yurodny Ensemble, Emma Martin Dance, National Concert Hall Dublin, Temenos and Rough Magic, with performances at international festivals including the Irish representation at the ISCM World Music Days 2016 in Tongyeong, South Korea.

As a performer, his collaborations include work with Jennifer Walshe, Savina Yannatou, John Taylor, Iarla Ó Lionáird, M.C. Schmidt, Gavin Bryars, Bobby McFerrin, Tom Arthurs, Lucas Niggli, Kate Ellis, Mihály Borbély, Matthew Jacobson, Miklós Lukács, Francesco Turrisi, Cora Venus Lunny, Crash Ensemble, Alex Bonney, Petar Ralchev, Zohar Fresco, Alkinoos Ioannidis, Theodosii Spassov, and world premières of new works by composers Mamoru Fujieda, Alla Zagaykevych, Dan Trueman, Ian Wilson, Benjamin Dwyer, Panos Ghikas, Kamran Ince, Roger Doyle, Dan Trueman, Judith Ring, Mel Mercier, Linda Buckley, Ed Bennett, Onur Türkmen, Christian Mason, Francis Heery, Piaras Hoban and Elaine Agnew.

As an educator, he has lectured and given workshops at the California Academy of Sciences, Trinity College Dublin (TCD), European Space Research and Technology Centre (ESTEC), University College Cork (UCC), Sonic Arts Research Centre (SARC), University College Dublin (UCD), Institute for Biodiversity, Science and Sustainability, San Francisco (IBSS), Cork School of Music (CSM), University of Limerick (UL), University of Aalborg, Copenhagen, National University of Ireland (NUI), Royal Irish Academy of Music (RIAM) and the Norwegian Center for Technology in Music and the Arts (NOTAM).

He is the artistic director of the Yurodny Ensemble, a founding member of The Water Project, and a partner at Diatribe Records.

In 2015 he was composer-in-residence at the California Academy of Sciences and the Irish Museum of Modern Art (IMMA) and in 2017 was artist-in-residence at the European Space Agency (ESTEC).

== Biography ==
Roth was born into a musical family in London; brothers Alex Roth and Simon Roth are also musicians, and mother Joy Mendelsohn is a music teacher (whose past students included Alastair King, George Michael and Andrew Ridgeley). He is married to Ukrainian vocalist Olesya Zdorovetska and since 2001 has been based in Dublin, Ireland.

He studied saxophone in London with Gilad Atzmon and composition in Dublin under Ronan Guilfoyle and Elaine Agnew, undertaking further studies of improvisation in New York City under Steve Coleman, Ravi Coltrane, and Vijay Iyer, of pedagogy in Kecskemét at the Zoltán Kodály Institute under Katalin Kiss, and of Makam theory and composition in Crete under Sokratis Sinopoulos and Ross Daly.

== Selected works ==
=== Orchestra ===
- Woodland Heights (2014) for string orchestra
- Flocking III (2013) for saxophone orchestra
- Stille Nacht (2012) for jazz orchestra
- Flocking I–II (2012) for string orchestra

=== Solo / Ensemble ===
- Seed I–II (2016) for percussion and tape
- Peregrinus (2016) for cathedral bells and electronics
- Little Woodland Heights (2015) for children's ensemble
- A Way A Lone A Last (2015) for recorder trio
- Temenos (2015) for bass clarinet and tenor recorder
- LakeCycle (2013) for piano and percussion
- StopStart (2012) for variable ensemble
- Water Project I–II (2011) for open ensemble and water
- Quintet (2010) for bass clarinet and string quartet
- Maoz Tsur (2010) for choir SSAA
- Jamilia (2009) for piano
- Griffmadár (2009) for large ensemble
- I am the Sea (2009) for voice and piano
- pliARS (2009) for large ensemble
- Evenset (2008) for large ensemble
- Parah (2008) for clarinet quartet
- Innehølder (2006) for large ensemble

=== Theatre ===
- The Waste Land (2015) for four voices, jazz quintet and film
- CAOS (2015) for dancer and improvising ensemble
- Tundra (2014) for ensemble and tape
- Vartn af Godot (2014) for ensemble
- Peer Gynt (2013) for ensemble
- Don Giovanni (2011) for voices, ensemble and electronics

== Discography ==
Artist	Album title	Year of release
Yurodny	Haivka	2016
Jennifer Walshe	Historical Documents of the Irish Avant-Garde	2016
Cork Gamelan Ensemble	The Three Forges	2015
Eine Jüdische Zeitreise	Sefarad Hören	2014
Caoimhín Ó Raghallaigh	Music for an Elliptical Orbit	2014
Kate Ellis	Jump	2014
Adrian Hart	Cuisle	2014
Cora Venus Lunny	Terminus	2014
Matthew Schellhorn	Ian Wilson: Stations	2014
OKO	I Love You Computer Mountain	2014
Benjamin Dwyer	Scenes from Crow	2014
European Saxophone Ensemble	Intimate in Public	2013
Roger Doyle	The Thousand-Year Old Boy	2013
Francesco Turrisi	Grigio	2013
ReDiviDeR	meets I Dig Monk, Tuned	2013
Paul Roe and Contempo Quartet	Dreams and Prayers	2013
Thought-Fox	My Guess	2013
Various	Tronix One	2012
Hidden Orchestra	Archipelago	2012
Paul Dunlea Group	Bi-polar	2012
Sefiroth Ensemble	Arboles Lloran por Lluvia	2012
ReDiviDeR	Never odd or eveN	2011
Elena Leonova	That Crazed Girl	2011
Francesco Turrisi	Fotografia	2011
Yurodny	Evenset	2010
Tarab	Tarab	2010
Hidden Orchestra	Night Walks	2010
Simon Jermyn	Hymni	2010
Izumi Kimura	Asymmetry	2010
Paul Roe	Between	2010
Isabelle O'Connell	Reservoir	2010
Ian Wilson	Double Trio	2009
Fuzzy Logic Ensemble	Mouthpiece	2009
Francesco Turrisi	Si Dolce è il Tormento	2009
Yurodny	Odd Set	2008
The Blizzards	Domino Effect	2008
Republic of Loose	Vol.IV Johnny Pyro and the Dance of Evil	2008
Kai Big Band	Projections	2006
Fuzzy Logic Ensemble	New Hat	2005
CFour	Cementex	2003
