= Patrick Nunn =

British composer and educator

Photographer: Nick Fallon 2008

Patrick Nunn (born 21 July 1969 in Tunbridge Wells, England), is a British composer and educator.

== Biography ==
Nunn read music at Dartington College of Arts studying under Frank Denyer between 1988 and 1991 taking additional tuition with Louis Andriessen at Dartington International Summer School and with Gary Carpenter at the Welsh College of Music and Drama. In 2004, he took his doctorate under Professor Simon Bainbridge at the Royal Academy of Music. He also received tuition under Jonathan Harvey, Tod Machover and Simon Emmerson.

In 1994, Nunn was awarded the Gregynog Composition Prize for Colour Cycle and in 1995, the BBC Radio 3 Composing for Children prize as part of the BBC's Fairest Isle festival for his work Songs of our Generation. His work Into My Burning Veins a Poison for quarter-tone alto flute, piano and electronics was awarded the RCM rarescale Composition Prize in 2004. In 2006, he was awarded a British Composers Award in the solo/duet category for Mercurial Sparks, Volatile Shadows and the Alan Bush Prize for Transilient Fragments in 2008. His proposal for Sentiment of an Invisible Omniscience was awarded the 2010 Millennium Prize from the Birmingham Conservatoire.

He taught techniques of composition and electroacoustics at the Royal Academy of Music between 2009 and 2019. His compositional work is currently published by Cadenza Music (Wise Music), Composers Edition and the ABRSM. In 2013, Nunn was made an Associate of the Royal Academy of Music (ARAM).

== Selected Compositions ==
- Lullaby, (1987, Rev.1998) for children's choir (ss) and piano
- Sonata, 1990 for flute and piano
- Polychrome Musique (1991) for large ensemble
- Colour Cycle (1994 rev. 2015) for violin and piano
- Merry Go Round (1994) for large ensemble
- Songs of our Generation (1995) for children's choir and orchestra
- Man Made (1995) for large amplified ensemble
- Bakers Dozen (1995) for flute and guitar
- Rents (1996) for counter tenor and guitar (electric/acoustic)
- Screw (1996) for large amplified ensemble
- Down In the Underpass (1998) for children's choir and small ensemble
- Raw Fuse (1998) for large amplified ensemble
- Cruise (1998 rev. 2007) for small ensemble
- Un Chant D'amour (1998) for chamber ensemble
- Sprite (1998) for solo piccolo
- Hell Bent inside the Be Oven (1999) for large ensemble
- The Oxen (2000) for children's choir and small ensemble
- String of Pearls (2000) for clarinet, violin and piano
- Black Strokes 1 (2000) for violin and piano
- Eid Milaad Saeed (2000) for solo clarinet
- 21st Century Junkie (2001) for six pianos
- Hextych (2001) for small ensemble
- Sleek Silver Symbols (2001) for soprano saxophone, electric guitar, bass guitar and percussion
- Maqamat (2002) for quarter-tone alto flute
- Un Chant d'amour (2003) for Piano - 4 hands
- Into my burning veins a poison (2004) for quarter-tone alto flute, piano and tape
- Gonk (2004) for bassoon and tape
- Shest Bulgarski Pesni za Detstvoto (2005) for children's choir and small ensemble
- Gaia Sketches (2005) for cello with Hyperbow and live electronics
- Music of the Spheres (2006) for piano and planets (sound file)
- Escape Velocity (2006) for accordion and string quartet
- Mercurial Sparks, Volatile Shadows (2006) for alto flute and piano
- Coalescence (2006) for clarinet, live electronics and movement sensors
- Transillient Fragments (2007) for violin and piano
- Fata Morgana (2007) for cello with Hyperbow, ensemble and live electronics
- Lauten (2007) for small ensemble
- Prism (2008) for bassett clarinet and piano
- 47 Tucanae (2008) for piano (four hands) and pulsars (sound file)
- Shoaling (2008) for harp, live electronics and movement sensors
- Intra aspicere (2008) for orchestra and live electronics
- ... of bones and muscle (2009) for piano and electronics
- Isochronous (2010) for piano, percussion and pulsars (sound file/electronics)
- Cameo for Carla (2010) for solo piano
- Pareidolia I (2012) for bass clarinet, sensors and live electronics
- Maya (2012) for two flutes, alto flute and sound file
- Shadowplay (2013 rev. 2015) for bass clarinet
- Gaudete (2013) for choir (SSAATTBB)
- Morphosis (2014) for piano, sensors and live electronics
- Eight Cryptograms (2015) for solo piano
- Lamellae (2015) for solo carillons a musique (30-note manual music box)
- Sotto un Cielo Lunare di Sangue (2018) for harp and piano
- Veiled (2019) for solo oboe
- Five Miniatures (2019) for horn (F or Eb) and piano
- Pandit (2023) for solo clarinet and Tanpura app

== Discography ==
- Morphosis (2016) Red Sock Records RSR003CD
- A Bassoonist's Cabinet of Curiosities (2015) Sfz Records SFZM0415
- Music of the Spheres (2009) Red Sock Records RSR001CD
- Prism (2009) NMC D139

== Awards ==
- 1994: Gregynog, Wales for Colour Cycle
- 1995: BBC Radio 3 Composing for Children, UK for Songs of our Generation
- 2004: Rarescale, Royal College of Music, London UK for Into My Burning Veins a Poison
- 2006: British Composer Awards (Solo/Duet), UK for Mercurial Sparks, Volatile Shadows
- 2008: Alan Bush Composition Prize, Royal Academy of Music, London UK for Transilient Fragments
- 2010: Birmingham Conservatoire Millennium Prize, UK for Sentiment of an Invisible Omniscience
- 2013: Associate of the Royal Academy of Music (ARAM)

Nunn has been shortlisted five times for the British Composers Award: in 2006 for Gaia Sketches, in 2007 for Escape Velocity, in 2008 for Transilient Fragments, in 2009 for Prism and in 2012 for Pareidolia I.
