= Redivider =

Redivider may refer to:

- Redivider (film), a 2017 American-Dutch film
- ReDiviDeR, a jazz ensemble from Ireland
