= Diatribe Records =

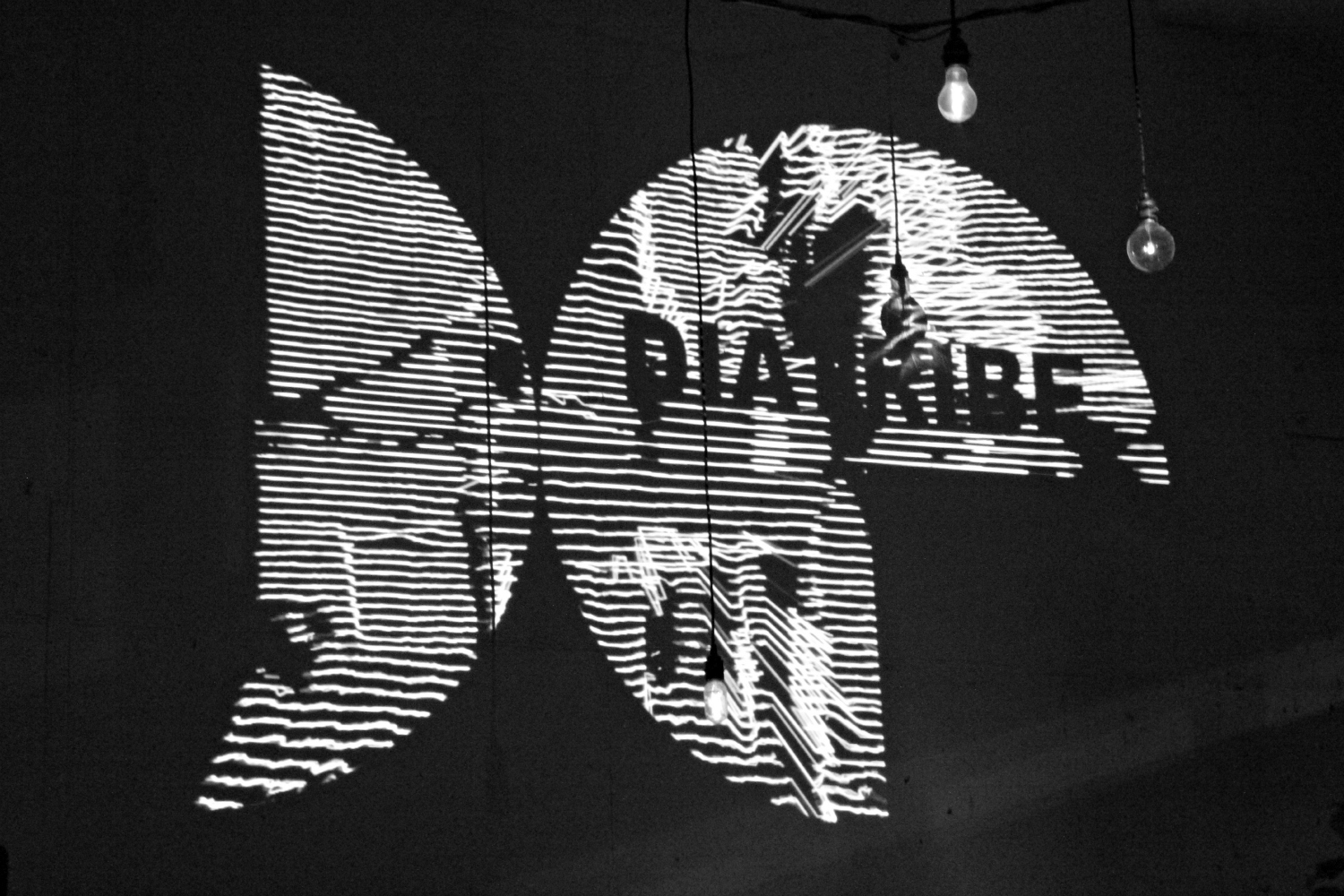
Diatribe Records logo render by Tim Redfern

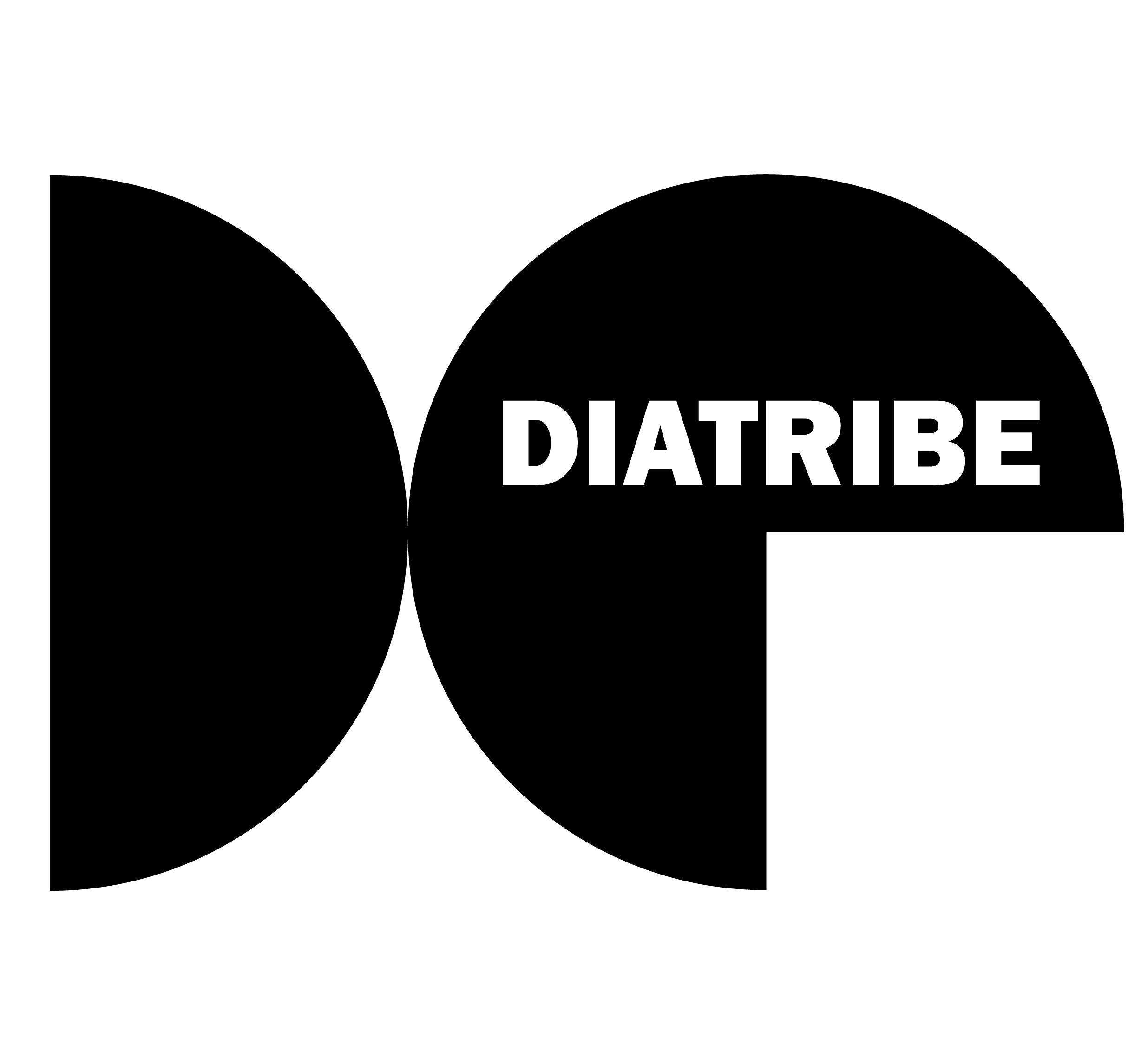
Diatribe Records Logo

Diatribe Records is an independent record label based in Dublin, Ireland.

== Artists ==
Artists and composers released on the label include Gilad Atzmon, Gerald Barry, Ed Bennett, John Buckley, Elliott Carter, Ben Davis, Donnacha Dennehy, Kit Downes, Roger Doyle, Colin Dunne, Benjamin Dwyer, Róisín Elsafty, Julie Feeney, Zohar Fresco, Mamoru Fujieda, Ronan Guilfoyle, Izumi Kimura, Stefano Landi, Cora Venus Lunny, Tarquinio Merula, Akira Miyoshi, Claudio Monteverdi, Mike Nielsen, Iarla Ó Lionáird, Caoimhín Ó Raghallaigh, Nick Roth, Matthew Schellhorn, Laura Sheeran, Duke Special, Barbara Strozzi, Thought-Fox, Francesco Turrisi, Niall Vallely, Ian Wilson, Takashi Yoshimatsu, Yurodny, and John Zorn.

== History ==
The company was founded in the late 1990s by Daniel Jacobson and John Cosgrove, with the aim to release and promote the work of local underground artists. The label began releasing electronic releases sporadically, mainly on vinyl. After a period of inactivity, Diatribe Recordings was re-launched in 2007 and releases became more frequent with the label focusing on a broader musical vision. From 2008, the label has been under the direction of Nick Roth and Matthew Jacobson.

According to label director Nick Roth: "The main reason for the existence of our label is not as a commercial enterprise but as a way of furthering and promoting the music".

The label has produced 29 album releases to date, ranging across genres including jazz, electronica, classical and contemporary music.

In 2009 the label then released a series of projects focusing on individual musicians called the Solo Series Phase I. The set constituted a conspectus of new music from three continents. Diatribe revisited this concept again in 2014, releasing another four projects under the Solo Series Phase II,“which features some of the country's most exciting and ground-breaking musicians making music today: Caoimhín Ó Raghallaigh (Hardanger d’Amore); Kate Ellis (cello); Adrian Hart (violin) and Cora Venus Lunny (violin, viola).”

The label released a solo record by fiddler Caoimhín Ó Raghallaigh, with one reviewer stating that Ó Raghallaigh's Music For An Elliptical Orbit, "contains some of the most beautiful and visceral musical compositions to have graced this earth".

== Releases ==
Artist	Album title	Release date
Yurodny	Haivka	6 April 2016
Cork Gamelan Ensemble	The Three Forges	13 August 2015
Caoimhín Ó Raghallaigh	Music for an Elliptical Orbit	15 August 2014
Kate Ellis	Jump	15 August 2014
Adrian Hart	Cuisle	15 August 2014
Cora Venus Lunny	Terminus	15 August 2014
Diatribe Records	Solo Series Phase II BoxSet	15 August 2014
Matthew Schellhorn	Ian Wilson: Stations	6 April 2014
OKO	I Love You Computer Mountain	24 March 2014
Benjamin Dwyer	Scenes from Crow	20 February 2014
Francesco Turrisi	Grigio	18 September 2013
ReDiviDeR	meets I Dig Monk, Tuned	7 October 2013
Thought-Fox	My Guess	8 May 2013
Various	Thought-Tronix: My Guess Remixed	8 May 2013
Various	Tronix One	21 April 2012
Various	Tronix Series	31 January 2012
TeaTroniK	Teatronica	24 May 2013
ReDiviDeR	Never odd or eveN	3 November 2011
Francesco Turrisi	Fotografia	2 February 2011
Yurodny	Evenset	10 October 2010
Simon Jermyn	Hymni	16 April 2010
Izumi Kimura	Asymmetry	16 April 2010
Paul Roe	Between	16 April 2010
Isabelle O'Connell	Reservoir	16 April 2010
Diatribe Records	Solo Series Phase I BoxSet	16 April 2010
Ian Wilson	Double Trio	1 April 2009
Francesco Turrisi	Si Dolce è il Tormento	1 February 2009
Yurodny	Odd Set	4 April 2008
White Rocket	White Rocket	2 February 2008
Zoidan Jankalovich	ZoiD Versus the Jazz Musicians of Ireland Vol 1	7 July 2007
