= ReDiviDeR =

Irish jazz ensemble

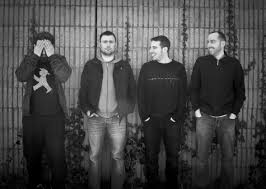

ReDiviDeR are a four-piece contemporary jazz ensemble based in Dublin, Ireland. The band consists of Matthew Jacobson (drums) - called "one of the most dynamic forces in Irish jazz, on and off the stage" by the Irish Times, Nick Roth (saxophone), Derek Whyte (bass guitar) and Colm O'Hara (trombone). To date, ReDiviDeR have released three albums on Diatribe Records.

== History ==
This quartet was formed in 2007 by drummer Matthew Jacobson, who enlisted the help of improv specialists - Derek Whyte on bass, Nick Roth on alto sax and Colm O'Hara on trombone. It allowed Jacobson an outlet for his creative compositions based around the idea of using no chords and his love of anagrams. Jacobson has been described as "one of Ireland's most exciting young talents" by the Irish Times. Influences range from Deerhoof to Charles Mingus to Jim Black, and after playing to a packed Triskel Auditorium at the Cork Jazz Festival 2011, they were awarded the accolade of “Best Young Irish Band“. ReDiviDeR have played many shows and festivals in Ireland, Italy, Norway, Sweden, France and The UK. To date the group have recorded and released three albums on Diatribe Records, Ireland's leading record label for new sounds.

== Albums ==
=== Never odd or eveN ===
ReDiviDeR released their debut album ‘Never odd or eveN' on Diatribe Records in 2011. It received a four-star review from The Irish Times jazz critic Cormac Larkin as well as a "one-to-watch-out-for" review from All About Jazz.

=== meets I Dig Monk, Tuned ===
Then two years later ReDiviDeR returned with their second album 'meets I Dig Monk, Tuned' released on October 7, 2013. The album has been described as "an inspired endeavour" by No More Workhorse, "melodious and unswervingly exploratory music" by The Guardian and "a striking musical collage… recommended for those generally disposed to imaginative, genre-bending music" by All About Jazz.

=== Mere Nation ===
'Mere Nation' is the third Diatribe release from Dublin-based two-horns-no chords quartet ReDiviDeR. Having taken a short sabbatical from performing after their last release, the group developed a new approach, aiming to give maximum freedom to each of the musicians’ considerable improvisatory instincts, while still retaining Jacobson's penchant for off-kilter grooves and interlocking melodies.

== Discography ==
Album title	Release date
Never odd or eveN	November 3, 2011
meets I Dig Monk, Tuned	October 7, 2013
Mere Nation	February 29, 2020
