= Matthew Schellhorn =

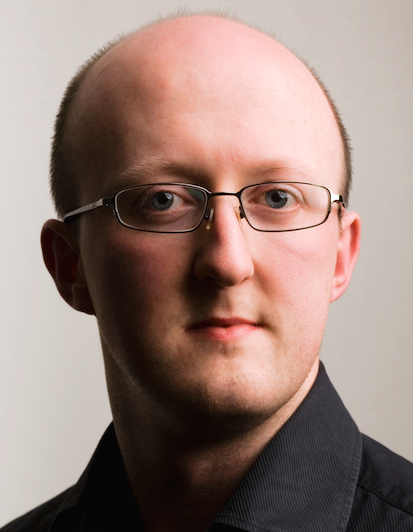

Background information
- Born: 4 February 1977 (age 49); Doncaster, England
- Genre: Classical
- Occupation: Pianist
- Instrument: Piano
- Years active: 1999–present
- Labels: Signum, Nonclassical, Navona, Diatribe, Red Sock, Naxos, NMC
- Website: matthewschellhorn.com

Matthew Schellhorn (born 4 February 1977 in Yorkshire) is an English classical pianist.

== Biography ==
=== Education ===
Matthew Schellhorn studied at Chetham's School of Music in Manchester and Girton College, Cambridge. His teachers included David Hartigan, Maria Curcio, Ryszard Bakst, Peter Hill and Yvonne Loriod.

=== Performances ===
Matthew Schellhorn's performances have been broadcast on BBC Radio 3 and Radio France.

He has given world premieres of works by Nicola LeFanu, Ian Wilson and Gráinne Mulvey. His 2009 commission Homage to Haydn from composers Tim Watts, Michael Zev Gordon, Cecilia McDowall, Cheryl Frances-Hoad, Colin Riley, and Jeremy Thurlow was later published in Muso Magazine. His 2014 disc, Ian Wilson: Stations, received positive press, with a four-star review from The Irish Times.

Schellhorn is particularly known for his performances of the music of Olivier Messiaen. His disc with the Soloists of the Philharmonia Orchestra, Messiaen: Chamber Works (Signum Classics SIGCD126) was an AllMusic Classical Editors' Favourite of 2008.

=== Politics and causes ===
Matthew Schellhorn launched his 2014 CD Ian Wilson: Stations with a fundraising concert for Christians in the Holy Land.

During 2014, he publicly campaigned against the Assisted Dying Bill tabled by Lord Falconer of Thoroton, writing for The Catholic Herald. He was also later interviewed in the newspaper.

In November 2018, he was appointed Patron of The Sand House Charity, which carries out educational, artistic and heritage projects and activities linked with South Yorkshire.

In March 2022, the National Youth Arts Trust (Charity No. 1152367) announced Matthew Schellhorn as a Patron.

== Honours and arms ==
=== Honours ===
Foreign

- 2021: Sovereign Military Order of Malta
  - Cross pro Merito Melitensi

Other

- (England) 2017: London - Liveryman of the Worshipful Company of Musicians

=== Arms ===
Coat of arms of Matthew Schellhorn
Adopted 2017 Crest Upon a Helm with a Wreath Argent and Sable A demi Bull Sable armed unguled and winding a Triton’s Trumpet Shell held between the forelegs Or. Mantled Sable doubled Argent Escutcheon Sable a Cross Ermine between four Triton’s Trumpet Shells in saltire points inwards Or Motto MON CŒUR VEILLE (French for "My heart watcheth")

== Publications ==
- Schellhorn, Matthew (November 2023). "Yvonne Loriod". In Sholl, Robert (ed.). Messiaen in Context. Cambridge: Cambridge University Press. pp. 18–26. ISBN 978-0-7546-5297-7.
- ‘New Recording of Rare Manuscripts by Herbert Howells’: Naxos Musicology International, June 2020
- Schellhorn, Matthew (June 2007). "Les Noces and Trois petites Liturgies: Stravinsky's Influence on Messiaen". In Dingle, Christopher; Simeone, Nigel (eds.). Olivier Messiaen: Music, Art and Literature. Aldershot: Ashgate. pp. 40–62. ISBN 978-0-7546-5297-7.

== Discography ==
- Herbert Howells: Piano Music, Vol. 1, Naxos Records, Naxos 8.571382 (July 2020)
- Colin Riley: Shenanigans, NMC Recordings, NMC D241
- Geoffrey Bush & Joseph Horovitz: Songs, Naxos Records, Naxos 8.571378 (July 2017)
- Patrick Nunn: Morphosis, Red Sock Records, RSR003CD (February 2016)
- Ian Wilson: Stations, Diatribe Records, DIACD016 (April 2014)
- Mulvey: Akanos, Navona, NV5493 (February 2014)
- Outside, Nonclassical, NONCLSS013 (October 2011)
- Messiaen: Chamber Works, Signum Classics, SIGCD126 (July 2008)
