= Simon Emmerson (composer) =

British composer

- Born: Simon T. Emmerson; 15 September 1950 (age 75); Wolverhampton, Staffordshire, England
- Education: University of Cambridge
- Occupation: Academic
- Known for: Electroacoustic music composer working mostly with live electronics

Simon Emmerson is an electroacoustic music composer working mostly with live electronics. He was born in Wolverhampton, UK, on 15 September 1950.

Simon Emmerson studied at Cambridge and at City University, London where he founded the electroacoustic music studio in 1975, remaining until 2004 when he joined De Montfort University, Leicester as Professor in Music, Technology and Innovation, and where he is now Emeritus Professor at the Institute for Sonic Creativity. He has been a composer and writer on electroacoustic music since the early 1970s. He was a Fellow of the Digswell Arts Trust, Welwyn Garden City 1972-77. Commissions include: Intermodulation, Singcircle, Lontano, Jane Manning, Philip Mead, Jane Chapman, GRM (Paris), IMEB (Bourges), Inventionen (Berlin), Sond-Arte Ensemble (Lisbon), and more recently for BEAST (Birmingham) and for soloists Darragh Morgan (violin), Carla Rees (flute) and Heather Roche (clarinet). He was a first prize winner at the Bourges Electroacoustic Awards in 1985 for his work Time Past IV (soprano and tape, commissioned by Jane Manning). Writings include: The Language of Electroacoustic Music (1986), Music, Electronic Media and Culture (2000), Living Electronic Music (2007), The Routledge Research Companion to Electronic Music (2018), coeditor and contributor Expanding the Horizon of Electroacoustic Music Analysis (2016). He was founder Secretary of the Electro-Acoustic Music Association of Great Britain (EMAS) in 1979 as well as later Board member of Sonic Arts Network (to 2004) and Sound and Music (2008-2013). He was Edgard Varese Visiting Professor at TU, Berlin (2009–10) and Visiting Professor and Composer at the Western Australian Academy of Performing Arts (Perth) in November 2016. Keynotes include: ACMC 2011 (Auckland), ICMC 2011 (Huddersfield), Music Science Technology 2012 (São Paulo), WOCMAT 2012 (Taiwan), Alternative Histories of Electronic Music 2016 (London), Midlands New Music Symposium (NottFAR) 2020, EMS Network (2021).

== Recordings ==
- [1] Digswell Duets (Emanem 4052) (1978)
- [2] Dreams, Memories and Landscapes (Continuum CCD1056) (1993)
- [3] Cultures électroniques 15 (Le chant du monde LCD 278074/75) (2001)
- [4] Spaces and Places (Sargasso SCD28055) (2007)
- [5] Points and Pathways (Sargasso SCD28060) (2008)
- [6] For Violin and Electronics (Diatribe Records DIACD021) (2017)
- [7] Sound Around - both near and far at once (NMC D282) (2025)

== Publications ==
- The Language of Electroacoustic Music (editor and contributor) (Macmillan, 1986 now Macmillan-Palgrave)
- Music, Electronic Media and Culture (editor and contributor) (Ashgate, 2000 now Routledge)
- Living Electronic Music (Ashgate, 2007 now Routledge)
- Expanding the Horizon of Electroacoustic Music Analysis (co-editor and contributor) (CUP, 2016)
- The Routledge Research Companion to Electronic Music: Reaching out with Technology (editor and contributor) (Routledge, 2018)
- '‘Live' versus 'real-time'’, Contemporary Music Review 10(2) (1994): pp. 95–101
- '‘Local/field': towards a typology of live electroacoustic music', International Computer Music Conference Aarhus, September 1994 (Proceedings: San Francisco: ICMA, 1994: pp. 31–34), reprinted in Journal of Electroacoustic Music (Sonic Arts Network 1996) 9: pp. 10–13
- ‘Acoustic/Electroacoustic: the Relationship with Instruments’, Journal of New Music Research 27(1–2) (1998), pp. 146–164
- ‘Aural landscape: musical space’, Organised Sound 3(2) (1998): pp. 135–140
- Co-author (with Denis Smalley): New Grove Dictionary of Music and Musicians entry ‘Electroacoustic Music’ (London: Macmillan, 2000)
- ‘New spaces/new places: a Sound House for the performance of electroacoustic music and sonic art’, Organised Sound 6(2) (2001) pp. 103–105
- ‘From Dance! To “Dance”: Distance and Digits’, Computer Music Journal, 25(1) (2001), pp. 13–20
- ‘In what form can live electronic music live on?’ Organised Sound, 11(3) (2006), pp. 209–219
- ‘Combining the acoustic and the digital: music for instruments and computers or pre-recorded sound’, in Roger T. Dean (ed.), The Oxford Handbook of Computer Music, OUP, 2009, pp. 167–188
- ‘Music Imagination Technology’ (Keynote Address), Proceedings of the International Computer Music Conference Huddersfield, July–August 2011, San Francisco: ICMA, pp. 365–372
- ‘Local/Field and beyond. The scale of spaces’ in Martha Brech and Ralph Paland eds., Kompositionen für hörbaren Raum/Compositions for audible space, Bielefeld: transcript Verlag, 2015, pp. 13–26
- ‘Feeling Sound', in Nicholas Reyland, Rebecca Thumpston eds., Music Analysis and the Body: Experiments, Explorations and Embodiments, Leuven Studies in Musicology 6. Leuven: Peeters, 2018, pp. 191-208
- ‘Playing the Inner Ear: Performing the Imagination’, in Mark Grimshaw-Aagaard, Mads Walther-Hansen, and Martin Knakkergaard eds., The Oxford Handbook of Sound and Imagination, Volume 2, New York: OUP, 2019, pp. 259–278
- ‘Memory, flux, wayfinding (in future electroacoustic music studies)’, Proceedings of the Electroacoustic Music Studies Network Conference 2021 (EMS21), Leicester. https://zenodo.org/record/5806614#.YhkCvC2l3A0
- ‘Analysing Non-Score-Based Music’, in Noise as a Constructive Element in Music: Theoretical and Music-Analytical Perspectives, Mark Delaere (ed.), London: Routledge, 2022, pp. 107–124
- Netaudio London & Sound and Music present: Perspectives on Digital Music – 12 interviews with leading practitioners. Simon Emmerson – ‘The future of live computer music’. YouTube – https://www.youtube.com/watch?v=78z1_8J8oVE
- ‘Electroacoustics – The Art of The Next Decade’, The Second Call – contemporary music magazine, Netherlands; Jan. 1984, #1, pp. 21–22. Translation to Russian. https://dvmusic.ru/index/articles/one/full/1804

== Selected works ==
- Spirit of '76 (flute, accelerating delay) (1976)
- Lol Coxhill & Simon Emmerson: Digswell Duets (soprano saxophone, electronics) (1978) [1]
- Ophelia's Dream (voices, live electronics) (1978–79) [2]
- Time Past IV (soprano, electroacoustic sound) (1984) [2, 3]
- Piano Piece IV (piano, electroacoustic sound) (1985) [2]
- Shades (of Night and Day) (piano, live electronics) (1989) [2]
- Pathways (flute, cello, sitar, tablas, keyboard, electronics) (1989) [5]
- Sentences (soprano, live electronics) (1991) [4]
- Points of Departure (harpsichord, live electronics) (1993) [5]
- Points of Continuation (electroacoustic sound) (1997) [5]
- Points of Return (kayagum, live electronics) (1998) [5]
- Fields of Attraction (string quartet, live electronics) (1997) [4]
- Frictions (electroacoustic sound) (1999)
- Five Spaces (electric cello, sound projection) (1999) [4]
- Time-Space (baroque flute, harpsichord, live electronics) (2001) [5]
- Arenas (piano, brass quintet, live electronics) (2003) [4]
- Resonances (electroacoustic sound) (2007)
- Stringscape (violin, electronics) (2010) [6]
- Memory Machine (multichannel electroacoustic sound) (2010)
- Microvariations (in Memoriam Jonathan Harvey) (flute, clarionet, violin, cello, piano, electronics) (2014)
- Microvariations II (piano, electronics) (2015) [7]
- Aeolian (multichannel electroacoustic sound) (2016) [7]
- Solo Flute Quartet (flutes (solo performer), electronics) (2018) [7]
- Piano Ring (piano, electronics) (2018) [7]
- Wind Clouds Showers (clarinets, electronics) (2020) [7]
- Near and Far (at once) (multichannel electroacoustic sound) (2022) [7]
