= Western concert flute family =

The Western concert flute family has a wide range of instruments.

== Piccolo ==
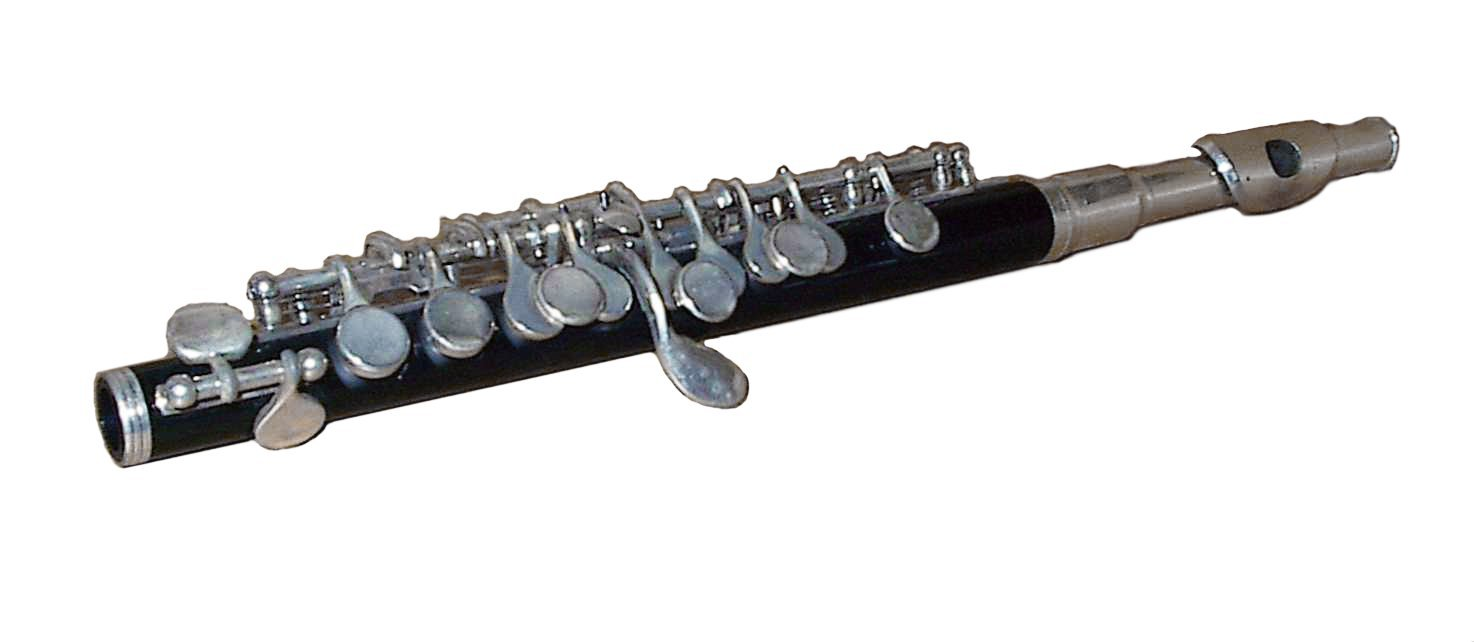
A Piccolo.

The piccolo is the highest-pitched member of the flute family, with a range an octave above that of the concert flute. It is usually the highest-pitched instrument within orchestras and bands. The piccolo is known for being difficult to play in tune due to its small size.

== Treble flute ==
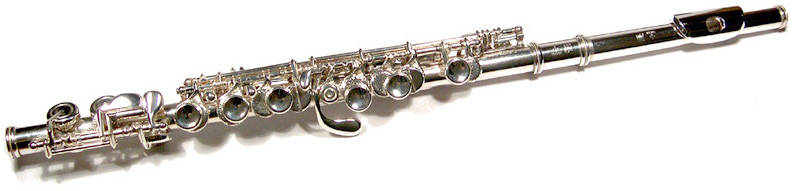
The Myall-Allen G Treble Flute.

The treble flute is pitched in the key of G, a fifth above the concert flute. The instrument is rare today, only occasionally found in flute choirs or private collections.

== Soprano flute ==
This distinctive-sounding instrument is rarely found at present. A few American publications for flute choir currently include a part for an E♭ (soprano) flute, an instrument pitched a minor third higher than the standard C flute. In these publications, an alternative part is provided either for the C flute or for the piccolo.

== Concert flute ==
The standard concert flute, also called C flute, Boehm flute, silver flute, or simply flute, is by far the most common member of the flute family. The flute is used in many ensembles including concert bands, orchestras, flute ensembles, occasionally jazz bands and big bands.

The instrument is pitched in C and has a range of just over three octaves starting from the musical note C_{4} (corresponding to middle C on the piano), however, some experienced flautists are able to reach C_{8}. Many professional flutes have a longer B-foot joint, which can reach B_{3}.

== Flûte d'amour ==
The flûte d'amour or flauto d'amore is pitched in A♭, A, or B♭ and is intermediate in size between the modern C concert flute and the alto flute in G. It is the mezzo-soprano member of the flute family. It is sometimes referred to as a tenor flute. The range of the instrument is from G_{3} to E_{7}. The B♭ version is usually used for jazz because both the tenor saxophone and clarinet are in B♭.

== Alto flute ==
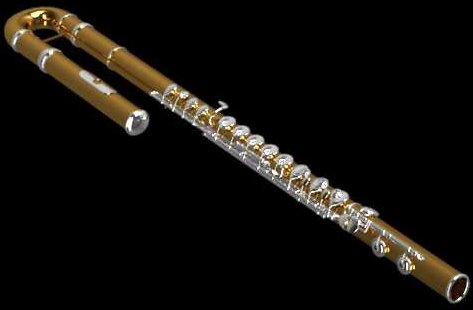
The alto flute.

The alto flute is characterized by its distinct, mellow tone in the lower portion of its range. The tube of the alto flute is considerably thicker and longer than a C flute and requires more breath from the player. However, this gives it a greater dynamic presence in the bottom octave and a half of its range. It is pitched in the key of G (sounding a fourth lower than written) with its range stretching from G_{3} to G_{6}. The headjoint may be straight or curved.

== Bass flute ==
The bass flute is pitched in the key of C, and one octave below the concert flute. Because of the length of its tube (approximately 146 cm or 57 in), it is usually made with a curved headjoint, sometimes in a "J" shape, to bring the embouchure hole within reach of the player. It is usually only used in flute choirs, as it is easily drowned out by other instruments of comparable register, such as the clarinet.

== Contra-alto flute ==
The contra-alto flute (also called contrabass flute in G or sometimes subbass flute) is in the key of G, pitched one octave below the alto flute, and a fourth below the bass flute. It is so large that the instrument's body is held vertically, with an adjustable floor peg similar to that of the bass clarinet.

== Contrabass flute ==
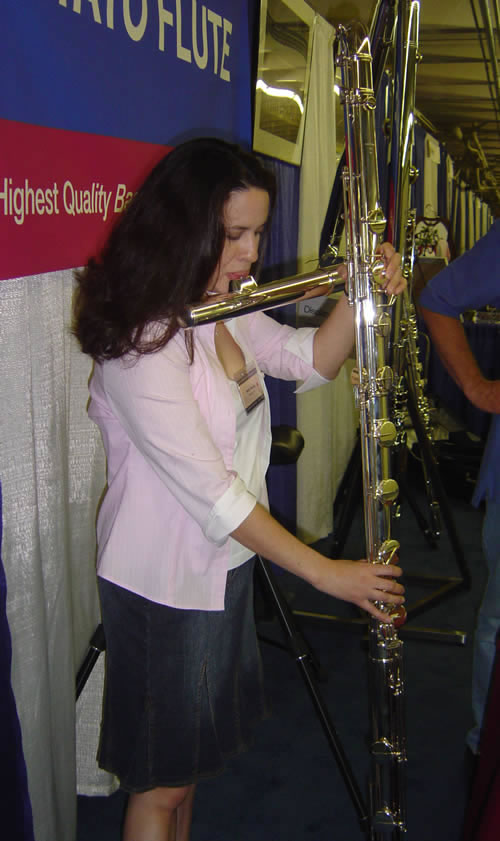
The contrabass flute.

The contrabass flute is used mostly in flute ensembles. Its range is similar to that of the regular concert flute, except that it is pitched two octaves lower; the lowest performable note is C_{2} (equivalent to the lowest C on the cello). Many contrabass flutes in C are also equipped with a low B_{1} (in the same manner as many modern standard sized flutes are). The contra-alto flute is sometimes referred to as a contrabass flute in G.

== Subcontrabass flute ==
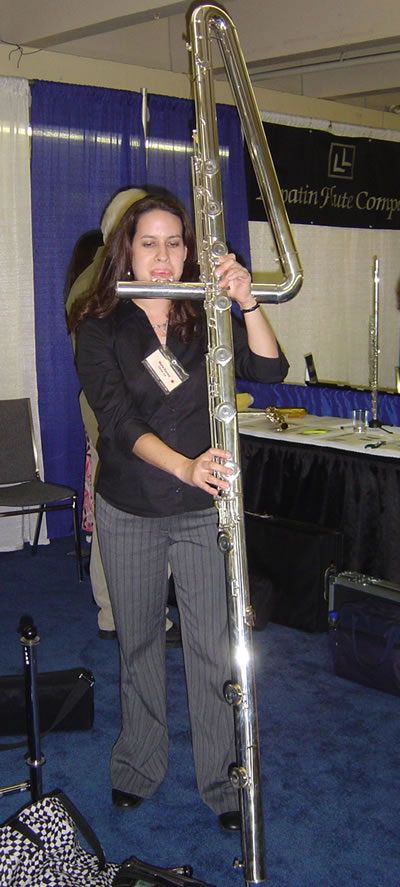
The subcontrabass flute.

The subcontrabass flute (sometimes called double contra-alto flute or octocontra-alto flute) is pitched either in the key of G, a fourth below the contrabass flute in C and two octaves below the alto flute in G, or in F, a fifth below the contrabass flute.

== Double contrabass flute ==
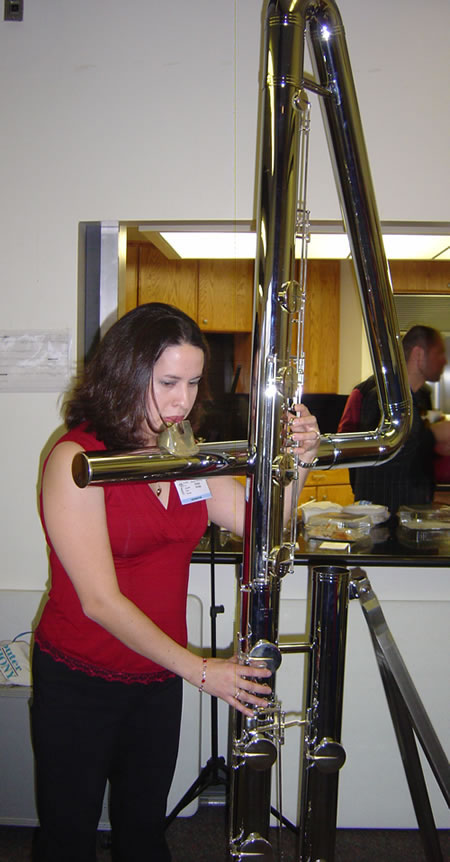
The double contrabass flute.

The double contrabass flute (sometimes called octobass flute or octocontrabass flute) is pitched in the key of C, three octaves below the concert flute (two octaves below the bass flute, and one octave below the contrabass flute). Its lowest note is C_{1}, one octave below the cello's lowest C. Despite the tendency of the larger sizes of flute to be quiet, the double contrabass flute has a surprisingly powerful tone, though it benefits from amplification in ensembles.

== Hyperbass flute ==
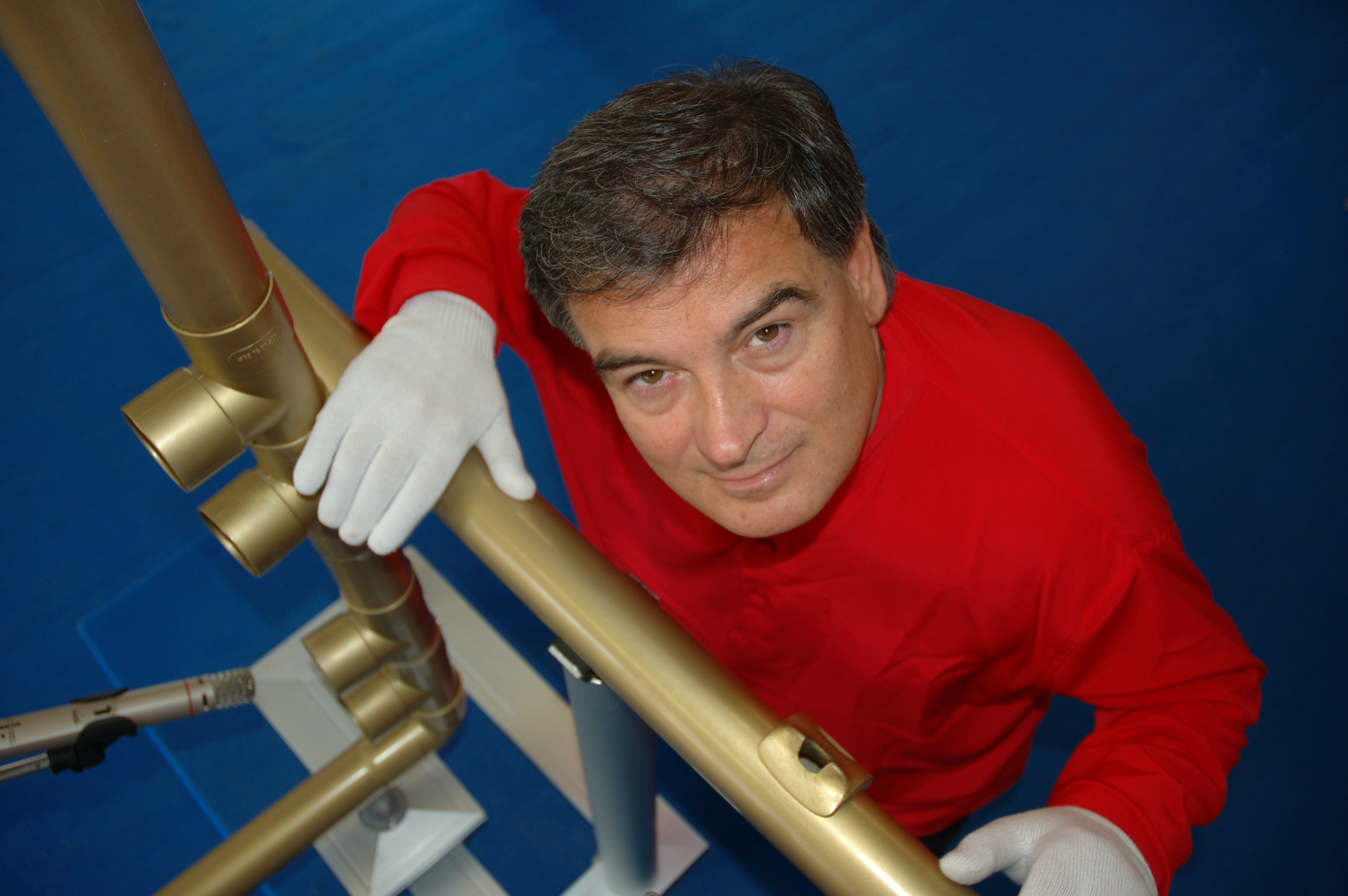
Roberto Fabbriciani with hyperbass flute.

The hyperbass flute (sometimes called hyperoctocontrabass flute) is the largest and lowest instrument in the flute family. It is pitched in C, four octaves below the concert flute (and three octaves below the bass flute, two octaves below the contrabass flute, and one octave below the double contrabass flute). It is made of PVC and wood, its tubing is over 8 metres (26 ft) in length and its lowest note is C_{0} (16 Hz), below what is generally considered the range of human hearing. The only known example of the instrument is a prototype built for Italian flautist Roberto Fabbriciani by Francesco Romei, a Florentine craftsman.
