= Gráinne Mulvey =

Irish composer

Gráinne Mulvey (born 10 March 1966) is an Irish composer.

== Biography ==
Mulvey was born in Dún Laoghaire, County Dublin, Ireland, and studied with Eric Sweeney at Waterford Regional Technical College, Hormoz Farhat at Trinity College Dublin and Agustín Fernández at Queen's University, Belfast. In 1999 she gained a DPhil in Composition at the University of York under the supervision of Nicola LeFanu. She currently holds the position of Professor of Composition at Technological University Dublin (formerly Dublin Institute of Technology) Conservatory of Music and Drama.

In April 2010, she was elected to membership of Aosdána, the State-recognised affiliation of creative artists in Ireland. A CD Akanos & Other Works, dedicated to her recent work, was released in February 2014 on the Navona label.

== Style ==
Gráinne Mulvey's music is timbrally and rhythmically complex—a legacy of her work in the electroacoustic field. Her microtonally-inflected language derives ultimately from the natural harmonic series, placing her somewhat in the spectral tradition. As she herself has written:

My music is increasingly concerned with a sense of place – with the natural world and mankind’s relationship with that world.

"I don’t look for the easy way out – I enjoy solving musical problems and relish a challenge."

Her body of work is characterized by a sense of restless turbulence, frequently utilizing extreme registers, intricate polyrhythms, and extensive timbral exploration, including the use of extended techniques. Harmonious or thematic resolution is typically deferred, occurring only after significant development.

== Awards and recognition ==
- 1994: Winner, Composers' Class of the RTÉ Musician of the Future Competition with Rational Option Insanity for oboe, clarinet, horn, violin and piano.
- 1994: Étude No 1 for piano chosen to represent Ireland at the International Rostrum of Young Composers.
- 1997: Awarded the Adjudicator's Prize at the Arklow Music Festival for Relentless for violin and piano.
- 1998: Awarded the Macaulay Fellowship by the Arts Council of Ireland/An Chomhairle Ealaíon.
- 1999: Winner, New Music for Sligo (Irish Section) with Maelstrom for string quartet.
- 1999: Sextet Uno and Rational Optional Insanity released on CD by Black Box Music.
- 2001: Appointed Lecturer in Composition at Dublin Institute of Technology Conservatory of Music and Drama. Adjudicator, Composition section, Feis Ceol, Dublin.
- 2003: Winner, St John Memorial University Composers' Competition with Latitude 50 for chamber orchestra
- 2003: Appointed Head of Composition at DIT. Co-adjudicator, Markievicz Medal for Composition. Composer-in-residence, Mercy Convent, Waterford.
- 2004: Jury member, Guido d'Arezzo International Composition Competition.
- 2004: Guest composer, Maynooth Composers' Summer School.
- 2006: Scorched Earth chosen to represent Ireland at the ISCM International Rostrum of Composers.
- 2007: Featured composer at RTÉ Horizons series - Scorched Earth, Akanos and Horizons Fanfare performed by Robert Houlihan and the RTÉ National Symphony Orchestra, National Concert Hall, Dublin.
- 2008: Akanos included on CD Contemporary Music from Ireland, Vol. 7.
- 2008: Akanos selected for ISCM World Music Days 2008 in Vilnius - performed by the Lithuanian National Symphony Orchestra cond. Robertas Šervenikas.
- 2009: Akanos performed by the Filharmonie Hradec Králové, cond. Andreas S. Weiser as part of 2009 Prague Premières festival.
- 2009: Stabat Mater selected for 2009 ISCM World Music Days, Sweden.
- 2010: Jury member, Guido d'Arezzo International Composition Competition.
- 2011: Jury member, Guido d'Arezzo International Composition Competition.
- 2012: Steel-grey splinters for solo piano, commissioned and performed by Matthew Schellhorn.
