= Alto flute =

Musical instrument

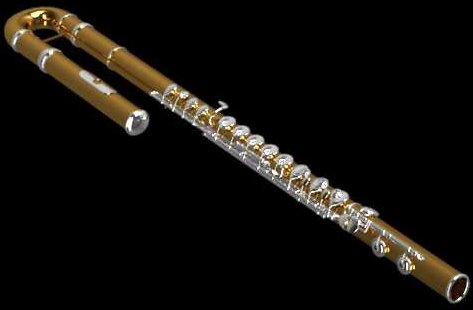
- Classification: Woodwind (Aerophone)

Playing range
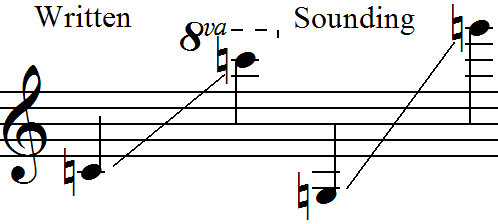

Related instruments
- Woodwind family (Clarinet, oboe, bassoon); Flute, bass flute, piccolo

Musicians
- List of Flautists

The alto flute is an instrument in the Western concert flute family, pitched below the standard C flute and the uncommon flûte d'amour. It is the third-most common member of its family after the standard C flute and the piccolo. It is characterized by its rich, mellow tone in the lower portion of its range. The bore of the alto flute is considerably larger in diameter and longer than the C flute, and requires a larger column of air (volume of air) from the player, though it also requires a slower airspeed. This gives it a greater dynamic presence in the bottom octave and a half of its range. Its range is from G_{3} (the G below middle C) to G_{6} (4 ledger lines above the treble clef staff) plus an altissimo register stretching to D♭_{7}. It uses the same fingerings as the C flute and piccolo. However, the instrument is a transposing instrument in G, which is sounding a perfect fourth lower than written.

British music that uses this instrument often refers to it as a bass flute, which can be confusing since there is a distinct instrument also called the bass flute. This particular naming confusion originated in the fact that the modern C flute is pitched in the same range as the Renaissance tenor flute; implying that a lower-pitched instrument should be called 'bass', following the pattern of other instruments. However, the flute family's pitch-range naming system does not correspond correctly to human voice pitches (see description of ranges in the C flute article).

== History ==
While there is no exact date that the alto flute was created, large flutes have existed for several hundred years. Some problems with early alto flute design included the long length of the tube, troublesome cross fingerings, inconsistent intonation, finger holes that were too wide across, and how far one's arm had to be stretched in order to reach the finger holes, particularly in the left hand. The greatest innovations to the alto flute were developed by Theobald Boehm in the 1850’s when he made the alto flute in G, and it was said to be his favorite flute. There is some research that shows this happened in the mid 1850’s, around 1854-1855, when he was 60 years old. The creation of this alto flute was to rid other lower pitch flutes of their current problems. The new flute design by Boehm had rational key systems and levers that were created in order to shorten the length that fingers needed to stretch. New changes were also made in modification to the bore size of the flute in order to support the low register of G. Along with the bore size, the placement and sizes of the keys were changed to complement the new, larger bore.

The first widely produced alto flute was created by Rudall Carte & Co. in London, 1891. They took many of Boehm's ideas and adjustments to create their alto flute. This alto flute was the lowest flute in the family, just under "Bass Flute G".

== Design and construction ==
Like other Western flutes, the alto flute is constructed of three main parts: the head-joint, the body joint, and the foot joint. Those pieces include an embouchure hole, tone holes, keys, and the mechanism that operates the keys. The head-joint for the instrument thereof may be constructed with either a straight head-joint, or a curved head-joint; all alto flutes with curved head-joints are often made in two parts. The straight head-joint is easier to play in tune in the high register due to its true conical bore shape, which is not possible with a curved head-joint. However, the curved head-joint could be a better option for those flutists who have smaller arms and/or smaller hands; it is frequently preferred by smaller players because it requires less of a stretch for the arms, and makes the instrument feel lighter by moving the center of gravity nearer to the player. The head joint is slightly tapered (conical bore) to accomplish precise tonal quality and it includes an embouchure hole. The body and foot joint of the alto flute are composed of either closed hole or open hole keys. Most alto flutes are made with closed hole keys; the Kingma system alto flutes are available with open holes. Open holed alto flutes have more possibilities for extended techniques.

=== Size ===
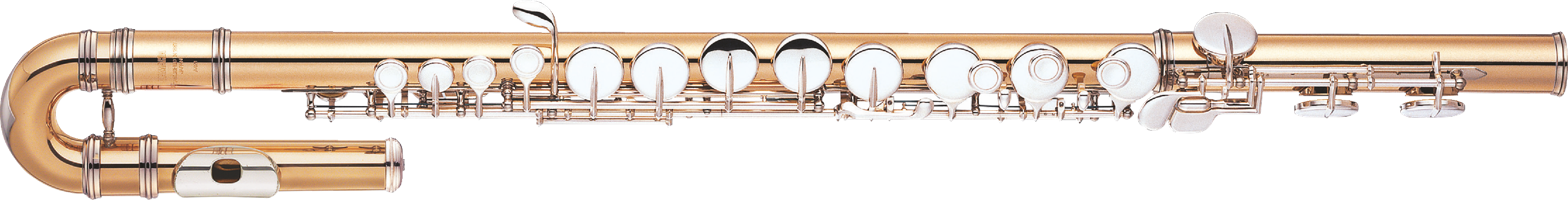
Alto flute with curved head.

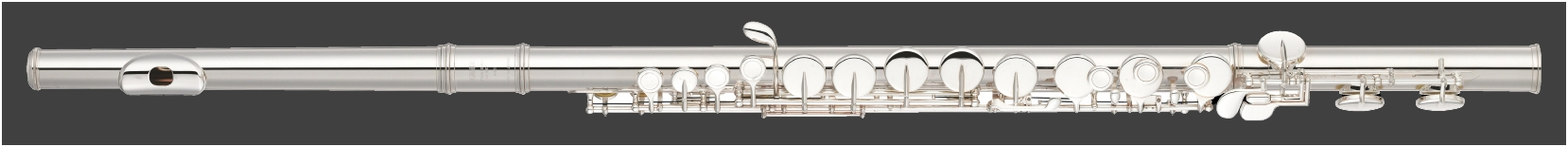
Alto flute with straight head.

The alto flute along with the other low flutes are constructed at a longer length than the concert flute; the larger the flute, the lower its pitch. The alto flute is about 1 inch in diameter and 34 inches in length. This compared to the concert flute makes it ¼ inch wider in diameter and almost 8 inches longer in length (Note: Alto flute length measurements may vary depending on the type of head-joint – curved or straight – and whether or not a person is measuring the overall length of the flute or the sounding length of the flute, which is the length measured from the middle of the embouchure hole to the end of the flute.) The tone holes on the alto flute are slightly smaller than those of the modern concert flute, relative to its size. According to Davis (1997), p. 26

"the averaged and converted alto flutes show that their tone holes are relatively smaller, compared to the C flute".

The arrangement of the holes can differ depending on the maker of the flute.

The embouchure-hole for alto flute is similar to that for C flute, but in proportion to the size of the instrument. Hence the embouchure-hole sits lower on the lower lip, and the lip-aperture is wider.

== Repertoire ==
Music written for alto flute includes, but is not limited to music, for alto flute alone (otherwise known as a solo), for alto flute and piano, for alto flute and mixed ensembles of many different instruments, and flute choir music. It also appears in orchestral music and film soundtracks.

The following lists are not intended to be complete, but rather to present a representative sampling of the most commonly played and well-known works for the instrument's repertoire. The lists also do not generally include works originally written for other instruments and subsequently transcribed, adapted, or arranged for alto flute, unless such piece is very common in the repertory, wherein the case is listed with its original instrumentation noted.

=== Alto flute solo ===
- Bruno Bartolozzi: Cantilena
- Garth Baxter: Variations on the Willow Tree
- Jonathan Bayley: Music for Pan (1982)
- Michael Csany-Wills: Trystyng
- Charles Delaney: Variations on the 'Seeds of Love' (1989)
- Jon Gibson: Untitled (1974)
- Alexander Goehr: Ariel Sing (2003)
- Philippe Hersant: Cinq Miniatures (1995)
- Daniel Kessner: A Serene Music (2012)
- Coreen Morsink: Andromache (2010)
- Patrick Nunn: Maqamat (2002)
- Michael Oliva: Les Heures Bleues (2013)
- Edwin Roxburgh: The Curlew (1994)
- Kaija Saariaho: Couleurs du vent (1998)
- Alexander Shchetynsky: Five Etudes (2011)
- Harvey Sollberger: Hara
- Karlheinz Stockhausen:
  - Susani's Echo, 3. ex Nr. 58 1/2 (1985)
  - Xi, 3. ex Nr. 55 (1986)
- David Bennett Thomas: Carla (2012)
- Guillem Ponsí: Alnilam (2020)

=== Alto flute and piano ===
- Arnold Cooke: Sonatina for Alto Flute and Piano (1985)
- Tom Febonio: Sonata for Alto Flute and Piano
- Daniel Kessner: Simple Motion (1993)
- Melvin Lauf: Passing Thoughts
- Phyllis Louke: As The Clouds Parted
- Andrew McBirnie: The Moon by Night (2003)
- Mike Mower: Sonnets
- Laura Pettigrew: Offertoire
- Gary Schocker: Sonata for a Lost Planet

=== Alto flute and others ===
- Pierre Boulez: Le marteau sans maître (1955)
- John Palmer: Afterglow
- Toru Takemitsu: Toward the Sea (1981)

=== Orchestral excerpts ===
In the standard orchestral repertoire, the alto flute is particularly associated with the scores of Igor Stravinsky, Maurice Ravel, and Gustav Holst, namely in The Rite of Spring, Daphnis et Chloé, and The Planets respectively.

Additional uses include:

- Franco Alfano: Cyrano de Bergerac (1938)
- George Fredric Handel: Riccardo Primo (1727)
- Alexander Glazunov: Symphony No. 8 (1906)
- Olivier Messiaen:
  - Des Canyons aux étoiles... (1974)
  - Éclairs sur l'Au-Delà... (1992)
  - Saint François d'Assise (1983)
  - La Ville d'en haut (1987)
  - Un vitrail et des oiseaux (1986)
- Sergei Prokofiev: Scythian Suite (1915)
- Nikolai Rimsky-Korsakov: Mlada (1892)
- Alexander Scriabin: Prefatory Action (1915) (performing version by Alexander Nemtin)
- Dmitri Shostakovich:
  - The Gamblers (1942) (left unfinished)
  - Lady Macbeth of the Mtsensk District (1934) (also known as Katerina Ismailova)
  - Symphony No. 7 (Leningrad) (1941)
- Edgard Varèse: Amériques (1921)
- Anton Webern: Sechs Stücke (1909) (original version)

=== Theatre and film ===
The alto flute is employed in modern film scores, notably in Howard Shore's music for The Lord of the Rings. However, even before 1940 it had been used occasionally in Hollywood; early Broadway pit orchestrations using the instrument include Jerome Kern's Music in the Air (1932) and Very Warm for May (1939), both scored by Robert Russell Bennett (the manuscript orchestrations are in the Jerome Kern Collection, Music Division, The Library of Congress).

== Performers and pioneers ==
A number of specialist alto flute players emerged in the 20th and 21st centuries. These include

Christian le Delezir	French	improvisor & composer
Christine Potter	American
Paige Long	American
Carla Rees	British	Kingma System alto flute player
Ali Ryerson	American	jazz player
Brian Landrus	American	jazz player
Peter Sheridan	American (Note: Peter Sheridan currently resides in Australia.)
Matthias Ziegler	Swiss	composer & performer
Stefan Keller	Swiss	composer & performer
Anne La Berge	Dutch	composer & performer
Florian Schneider-Esleben	German	alto flute player in the first few years of the electronic band, Kraftwerk

=== Christine Potter ===
Christine Potter established a connection with the alto flute while she was studying at the university of New Mexico. As she became more experienced with the flute and fell more in love with the instrument, she began to compile a repertoire of music and publishers that included parts for the alto flute. At this point, she had such a repertoire that she wanted to make sure that her findings were available online to people who were also interested in playing the instrument. In doing so, she was connected with other flute players like Carla Rees, and the two specialists put their information together and created a compiled list of music. Potter had the opportunity to perform at a convention in Chicago showing how the alto flute could be considered a low solo instrument. This was received very well and Potter was invited to perform with different concertos around the country. At a 2012 Las Vegas Convention, Potter performed the world premiere of a low flute ensemble that she had been working on with other low flute specialists. The performance garnered excellent feedback from the audience, inspiring Potter to reach out to other performers and music composers around the world to perform her own and other peoples pieces. Potter has commissioned thirteen pieces since then that feature the low flute as well as produced a number of her own arrangements and compositions. She holds the distinction of being the initial individual to chair the National Flute Association Low Flutes Committee and pioneered what is called the International Low Flutes Festival in Washington D.C, bringing flutists of all skill levels and age together to give the low flute center stage of their performances. This along with conducting many competitions, Potter has been an important performer and pioneer in the generation of usage of the alto flute as well as the study of the alto and other low flutes.

=== Paige Long ===
Paige Long initially played violin in a faculty orchestra in her place of employment. She was offered a position to play piccolo and took the position to open up new opportunities for her. She was offered a flute teaching position a year later. Whilst in this position, Long started a flute choir to attract more people and was allowed to purchase an alto flute and a bass flute. The choir became very popular, but she knew she needed to improve the quality of the lower sound. She attended a convention where she heard a low flute ensemble, and becoming more interested, she intended to gather more low flutes for her own ensembles. At a convention three years later, Long had the opportunity to purchase "the first contrabass flute in all of North and South America". Paige Long spent many years and much money to try to incorporate the low flute into many ensembles, and is one of the biggest advocates of the low flute in music.
