= Norwegian Center for Technology in Music and the Arts =

NOTAM (Norwegian Center for Technology in Music and the Arts, established in 1993) is a center for the development and creative use of technology in music and the arts situated in Oslo, Norway.

Internationally, NOTAM contributes to the music technology network through developmental work, participation in international projects and conferences, and as the recipient of exchange students and guest artists. NOTAM's network in Norway consists of artists, academics, and organizations or institutions with technical or creative working fields. NOTAM serves as a resource center for composers, musicians, artists and developers of music and arts technology who require technical or artistic supervision in their projects.

NOTAM is one of the founding members of the Ultima Oslo Contemporary Music Festival.
