= Zdzisław Wysocki =

Polish composer

Zdzisław Wysocki is a Polish composer, born in 1944 in Poznań (Posen).

Wysocki studied composition in Poznań (1963–1968) and later at the Hochschule für Musik und darstellende Kunst in Vienna with Erich Urbanner. He became an Austrian citizen in 1976.

Wysocki's works have been performed in Europa by the Ensemble Wiener Collage and its artistic director René Staar: at the Salzburg Festival in 2003, the Kölner Philharmonie in 2000, the Stars of the White Nights Festival in 2007, at the Wiener Konzerthaus in 1996, and several other occasions. His work "Double Concerto" has been premiered by Kent Nagano in San Francisco in 2002, his three orchestra Etudes (Nr. 99-101) were premiered in February 2014 by the McGill Symphony Orchestra, Montreal, under the baton of Alexis Hauser. He has written additional commissions for the Ensemble Wiener Collage.

His work combines elements of the 2nd Vienna School and the Polish Avantgarde, namely Witold Lutosławski.

== Activities ==
- 1968 - 1969 Hochschule für Musik Posen, Posen: Piano Korrepitition
- 1968 - 1971 Musiklyzeum Posen, Posen: Teaching (harmony, orchestration, piano improvisation)
- 1972 - 1973 Korrektor Universal Edition Vienna 1973
- Teacher (Music history, score reading, piano, composition, political science)
- University of Music and Performing Arts Vienna Vienna 1974 - 1976
- 1997 guest professorship, department of church music (composition, music theory) University for Music and the Performing Arts Graz
- Choir director and conductor
- Pianist

== Selected major works ==
- Op 30 (1979) Missa in honorem Joannis Pauli Secundi
- Fantasia per violoncello e pianoforte Op.33 (1981)
- Elegia 1943 in memoriam of the Warsaw Uprising Op.37 (1982-1985)
- Etudes (more than 100 pieces collected in 5 books)
- Etudes I Op. 54 (Etudes Nr. 1-12 for various ensemble types) (1995-1996)
- Etudes II-IV for different chamber music ensembles Nr. 13-84 (book II-IV Opp. 56, 60 and 65)
- Etudes Nr. 85-98 (book V Op. 69, first part)
- Three Etudes for Orchestra (Etudes Nr. 99-101) (2013)
- Quattro Miniaturi per Violine e Pianoforte Op.35 (1983)
- Quartetto op. 46
- Movimenti for 4 saxophones Op.47
- Quasi Divertimento op. 49
- Horntrio op. 51
- De finibus temporum op. 52 für Sopran und 16 Spieler
- Quintettino op. 53 (1994/95) für Akkordeon und Streichquartett
- Trio for Violin, Violoncello and Piano Op.55 (1995)
- Trio for Flute, Viola and Harp Op.57 (1995)
- Momenti op. 59 (1997) für Violine, Klarinette, Saxophon und Klavier
- "Concerto Doppio" Op. 67(2002/03) für Harfe und Posaune
- "Double Concerto" Op. 63 (Double Concerto for Two Violins and Orchestra)
- Musica di natale Op.68
- Two Bagatelles for 38 wind instrumentalists and 2 percussion players Op.72
- Cello Concerto Op.71
