= Marcin Bortnowski =

Polish composer

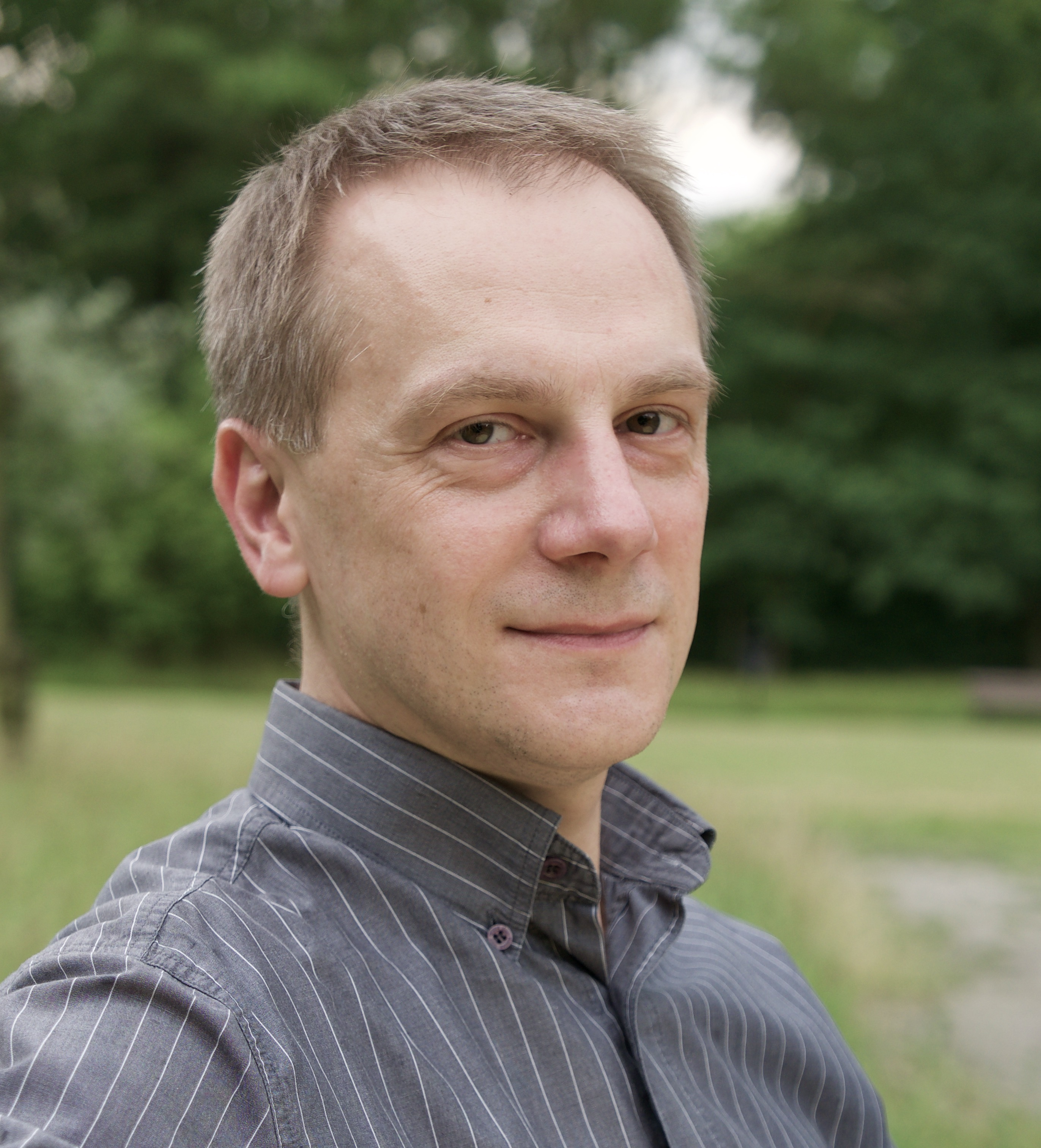
- Born: 1 March 1972 (age 54); Żary, Poland
- Occupation: Composer

Marcin Bortnowski (born 1 March 1972 in Żary, Poland) is a Polish composer of classical music.

== Life ==
He studied composition with Grażyna Pstrokońska-Nawratil at the Music Academy in Wrocław, graduating with honours in 1997. He took part in the 2nd International Meetings of Young Composers in Apeldoorn, organised by the Gaudeamus Foundation (1996) and in the experimental and computer music workshops at the University of Ghent (1997). In 2003 he obtained a doctoral degree in composition, and in 2012 a habilitation in the same discipline. In 2020 he received the title of Professor from the President of the Republic of Poland. Apart from writing music, he is also active as a lecturer in composition, contemporary composition techniques and computer music on the faculty of the Academy of Music in Wrocław.

His accolades include awards at the Tadeusz Baird Competition for Young Composers (2nd Prize for String Quartet No. 2 and Special Prize for String Quartet No. 1 in 1995, 2nd Prize for Music for... in 1997), the National Composition” Competition in Gdańsk, 1997 (3rd Prize for Symphony No. 1) and at the Pan Accordion Competition 2000 (1st Prize for Music in Lent for accordion and string quartet). He received scholarships from the Ministry of Culture and Art, ZAiKS Polish Association of Writers and Composers for the Stage, the Friends of the Warsaw Autumn Foundation, Ernst von Siemens Music Foundation and Deutschlandfunk. He is a member of the Polish Composers' Union and the Polish Society for Electroacoustic Music (PSeME).
