= Ronan Guilfoyle =

Irish jazz educator and performer (born 1958)

- Born: 5 March 1958 (age 68); Ireland
- Occupations: Jazz educator and performer

Ronan Guilfoyle (born 5 March 1958) is an Irish jazz educator and performer. He is the director of jazz at Newpark Music Centre in Dublin, Ireland and has performed extensively around the world. He is also a composer for classical ensembles and he has had commissions from a wide range of ensembles and organizations. Some of his piano works have been recorded by Izumi Kimura.

He plays the acoustic bass guitar and has performed with many notable musicians including Joe Lovano, Kenny Werner, Dave Liebman, Brad Mehldau, Larry Coryell and Rudresh Mahanthappa.

Guilfoyle is also the director of jazz performance at Dublin City University, All Hallows Campus.
