= Hyperbow =

The Hyperbow is an electronic violin bow interface that was developed as a result of an in-depth research project by students at MIT. The instrument is intended for use only by accomplished players and was designed to amplify their gestures, which lead to supplementary sound or musical control possibilities. It offers the violin player a range of expressive possibilities in its form as an augmented bow controller that lends itself to the control of bowed string physical models.

== Development ==
The creation of musical instruments that utilize technology to increase the functionality and subtlety of control has been an endeavour of Tod Machover and his research group since 1986. This collaboration has produced a series of "augmented instruments" called Hyperinstruments such as the HyperCello, an acoustic cello created in 1991 for Yo-Yo Ma. The Hyperbow itself has an older version called Hyperviolin, which was designed for Ani Kavafian.

The Hyperbow project sought to capture the most intricate aspects of violin bowing technique, the subtle elements that immediately and directly impact the sound of the instrument while playing. It uses accelerometers and electromagnetic field sensor in order to track the instrument's motion. There is also a mechanism that measures the force of the bow called single strain gauge. Both of these collect data that are then sent to the radio transmitter wirelessly. The data allows the evaluation of bowing techniques and drives a specified calibration procedure. The physical gesture data collected can also be used to control audio effects and synthesis algorithms in real-time.

The Hyperbow interface was featured in Toy Symphony performances with violinists Joshua Bell and Cora Venus Lunny, and several pieces for cello and Hyperbow have recently been developed and recorded by colleagues at the Royal Academy of Music.

Current research uses the Hyperbow as a measurement system to investigate the interaction of bowing parameters (acceleration, force, position) and the corresponding effects on the audio produced.

Diana Young revised the Hyperbow hardware and created two Hyperbows for cello for a collaboration with the Royal Academy of Music in London. Several compositions featuring the Hyperbows have been written and recorded. Two early pieces were presented on December 2, 2005 at the research seminar entitled New Tools, New Uses, at the Royal Academy of Music and again at the New Instruments for Musical Expression conference NIME on June 8, 2006 as part of a series of seminars on Digital Interfaces for the Violin Family.
