= Robert Stiegler =

Robert Stiegler (1938–1990) was a Chicago filmmaker and photographer, whose work grew out of the approaches to photography and design taught at the Institute of Design (ID) in the 1960s and 1970s. His work is in the collections of the Museum of Modern Art in New York, the Art Institute of Chicago, the George Eastman House, the Museum of Contemporary Art in Chicago, and the University of Illinois Chicago. His films Traffic (1960), Capitulation (1965), Licht Spiel Nur 1 (1967), and Full Circle (1968) are housed at the Chicago Film Archives.

== Biography ==
Robert Stiegler lived in Chicago his entire life as a photographer and filmmaker. Stiegler received his Bachelor's degree in 1960 and his Master's degree in 1970 from the Institute of Design, where he studied under Harry Callahan and Aaron Siskind. He also worked for Chicago photographers Vince Maselli, and Morton Goldsholl Design Associates in the early 1960s. In 1966, Stiegler took a professorship at the University of Illinois at Chicago. There, he headed the Photography Department and taught at the university until his death in 1990.

== Photography career ==
Stiegler received grants from the National Endowment for the Arts and the Illinois Arts Council.

In 1992, Gallery 400 at the University of Illinois at Chicago mounted a retrospective of Stiegler's work. Stiegler's work was included in an exhibition of more than fifty photographs by students of ID professors Harry Callahan and Aaron Siskind at Stephen Daiter Gallery in 2010. The Museum of Contemporary Art Chicago exhibited his work Chicago, 1974, alongside other Chicago photographers, and filmmakers during the CITY SELF exhibition in 2014. The California Museum of Photography showcased a retrospective of photography in Chicago in honor of Charles Desmarais in 2016. The exhibition, The Chicago Gift Revisited, displayed Stiegler’s work with pieces from twenty-two other Chicago-based photographers. Stiegler's work was showcased at Art Basel in 2017, represented by Corbett vs. Dempsey. Stephen Daiter Gallery in Chicago presented a solo exhibition of Stiegler's work in the spring of 2022.

The Library of Congress holds Stiegler's photograph State Street, Chicago (1973) in its collection. Pieces in the AIC collection include Chicago Circus (1976), Temple of Amon, Luxor Eg. (1981), Untitled (1965), and Untitled, (1971).

== Film career ==
Robert Stiegler’s practice included both photography and filmmaking. During his time at Institute of Design he experimented with film, creating multiple works exploring abstraction, and negative exposure. Out of the Vault: Robert Stiegler – Light Play, showcased a collection of his film works including Traffic (1960), Capitulation (1965), Licht Spiel Nur (1967), Full Circle (1968). Each work was shown on 16mm film.

== Grants and fellowships ==
- Artists Grant, Illinois Arts Council, 1983
- Photographers Fellowship, National Endowment for the Arts, Research Leave, University of Illinois, Research Board, 1980
