= Izumi Kimura =

Japanese pianist (born 1973)

Izumi Kimura (born 10 March 1973) is a Japanese pianist and teacher now living in Ireland. Kimura currently teaches at the Dublin City University in jazz and contemporary music studies. As a performer and composer, she has been associated with contemporary music and is perhaps best known for her 2010 debut album Asymmetry.

== Biography ==
Izumi Kimura was born in Yokohama-shi, Kanagawa, Japan in 1973. She studied music and specifically the piano from an early age. Kimura attended the Toho Gakuen School of Music with Akikio Teranishi, Akira Miyoshi and Kazuoki Fujii. After graduating in 1995, she sought to explore music outside the classical realm and moved to Ireland, where she studied at the Royal Irish Academy of Music with Ray Keary.

== Career ==
Izumi Kimura is an acclaimed practitioner of contemporary piano music, improviser, composer, and educator. Her music is influenced by her connections to Japan and Ireland.

Kimura is an active performer as a soloist and collaborator in contemporary and jazz/improvisation genres. As a soloist she played many festivals such as Music Curren Festivalt, Galway Jazz Festival, she has broadcast on RTÉ lyric FM, performed with the RTÉ National Symphony Orchestra and the RTÉ Concert Orchestra. Many of Kimura’s solo works are recorded on albums such as A Dream Within a Dream (2016), Refrains (2012), A Dream and Variations (2012), and Asymmetry (2010).

Her debut album Asymmetry was released on Diatribe Records and combines works by contemporary Japanese and Irish composers, including Mamoru Fujieda, Takashi Yoshimatsu, Toshinao Sato, Greg Caffrey, Ronan Guilfoyle and Gerald Barry. The critic Karishmeh Felfeli described the album as "one of the most original, creative and stimulating recordings of 2010 to be heard on an Irish label, an absolute revelation". The critic of the Irish Times agreed: "heroic levels of technical fearlessness, stamina and strength in a programme dominated by flying, rumbling bass lines, hard-driven rhythms and counter-rhythms, and thousands upon thousands of notes – she also created a breathing, slow-burn climax – with a more reflective, often intimate style of playing".

Kimura has performed with the Crash Ensemble, an Irish ensemble specialising in contemporary classical music, as well as collaborated with musicians and composers such as Julian Arguelles, Sarah Buechi, Greg Caffrey, Benjamin Dwyer, Mamoru Fujieda, Ronan Guilfoyle, Tommy Halferty, Ed Neumeister, Kevin O’Connell, and Stéphane Payen. These collaborations can be heard on albums such as Maelstrom (2016), Cloudscapes (2013), and Muga (2013).

== Discography ==
Artist	Album title	Release date
Izumi Kimura	Asymmetry	June 6, 2010

- Glacial Voyage (Challenge/Between The Lines 2025) with Christy Doran
