= Ian Wilson (composer) =

Irish composer

Ian Wilson (born 26 December 1964) is an Irish composer.

== Career ==
Wilson was born in Belfast, studied violin and piano, and graduated with a DPhil in composition from the University of Ulster at Jordanstown in 1990, where he was a research fellow, 2000–3. He has been a composer-in-residence with Leitrim County Council and was music director of the Sligo New Music Festival from 2003 to 2011. He received the Macaulay Fellowship from the Arts Council of Ireland in 1992, and in 1998 he was elected to Aosdána, Ireland's academy of creative artists. Since 2009, he has been a post-doctoral research fellow at Dundalk Institute of Technology, investigating aspects of traditional (ethnic) Irish performance practice as a basis for new works of art music.

Wilson's music has been performed at the BBC Proms, Venice Biennale, ISCM World Music Days and the Ultima Festival in Oslo and by such diverse groups as the RTÉ National Symphony Orchestra, the London Mozart Players, the Irish Chamber Orchestra, the pianist Hugh Tinney and many others.

He has recorded many albums, including two releases for Diatribe Records.

== Recordings ==
Album title	Record label	Release date
Stations	Diatribe Records	2014
Double Trio	Diatribe Records	2009

== Bibliography ==
- Axel Klein: Die Musik Irlands im 20. Jahrhundert (Hildesheim: Georg Olms, 1996)
- Tim Johnson: 'Out of Belfast and Belgrade: The Recent Music of Ian Wilson', Tempo, no. 224 (April 2003): 2–10
- Gareth Cox, Axel Klein (eds.): Irish Music in the Twentieth Century (= Irish Musical Studies vol. 7) (Dublin: Four Courts Press, 2004)
