= Mamoru Fujieda =

Japanese composer (born 1955)

- Born: January 1, 1955; Japan
- Other name: 藤枝 守
- Occupation: composer
- Website: Mamoru Fujieda official site

Mamoru Fujieda (藤枝 守, Fujieda Mamoru; born 1955) is a Japanese composer associated with the postminimalist movement of contemporary classical music.

== Biography ==
He received a Ph.D. in music from the University of California, San Diego in 1988. His composition instructors have included Joji Yuasa, Morton Feldman, Gordon Mumma, and Julio Estrada.

He currently serves as a professor at Kyushu University (Faculty of Design) in Fukuoka, Fukuoka, Kyūshū, Japan.

His music has been recorded for the Tzadik Records and Pinna labels.

== Major works ==
- Falling Scale No. 1 - No. 7 (1975–82)
  - No. 1, 2 and 3 (piano solo)
  - No. 4 and 7 (2 pianos)
  - No. 5 (3 pianos)
  - No. 6 (prepared piano or piano)
- Upward Falling for piano (1980)
- Planetary Folklore I for piano (1980)
- Begin at the Beginning, End at the End, Begin at the End, End at the Beginning for piano (1982)
- Decorational Offering for piano (1983)
- Night Chant No. 2 for mixed chorus (1994)
- Patterns of Plants (1995-)
- Antiphones Resounded for mezzo-soprano, tenor, children's chorus and instrumental ensemble (1999)
